= Slug and Lettuce (disambiguation) =

Slug and Lettuce is a pub chain in the United Kingdom.

Slug and Lettuce may also refer to:

- Slug and Lettuce (fanzine), a fanzine in the United States
- Slug and Lettuce, Islington, a pub in Islington, London, the first Slug and Lettuce location
