= Einar Ágústsson =

Icelandic politician and minister

Einar Ágústsson (23 September 1922 – 12 April 1986) was an Icelandic politician and minister. He graduated from the Reykjavik College in 1941 and received his law degree from the University of Iceland in 1947. His son Sigurður become CEO and then chairman of the bank Kaupþing in the years leading up to its 2008 collapse.
