= Bay Restaurant Group =

United Kingdom hospitality company

Bay Restaurant Group Ltd
- Type: Private
- Industry: Hospitality
- Founded: 28 March 2008
- Headquarters: Porter Tun House, 500 Capability Green, Luton, Bedfordshire, LU1 3LS
- Area served: UK
- Key people: Ian Payne; Chairman; Suzanne Baker; Chief Executive
- Products: Pub and restaurant chains
- Parent: Kaupthing
- Website: Bay Restaurant Group
- Footnotes; Sister company of the Town & City Pub Company

The Bay Restaurant Group is a hospitality company in the United Kingdom, specialising in restaurant and pub chains.

== History ==
The company originates from three former companies: Yates's, SFI Group and the Laurel Pub Company.

=== Laurel Pub Company ===
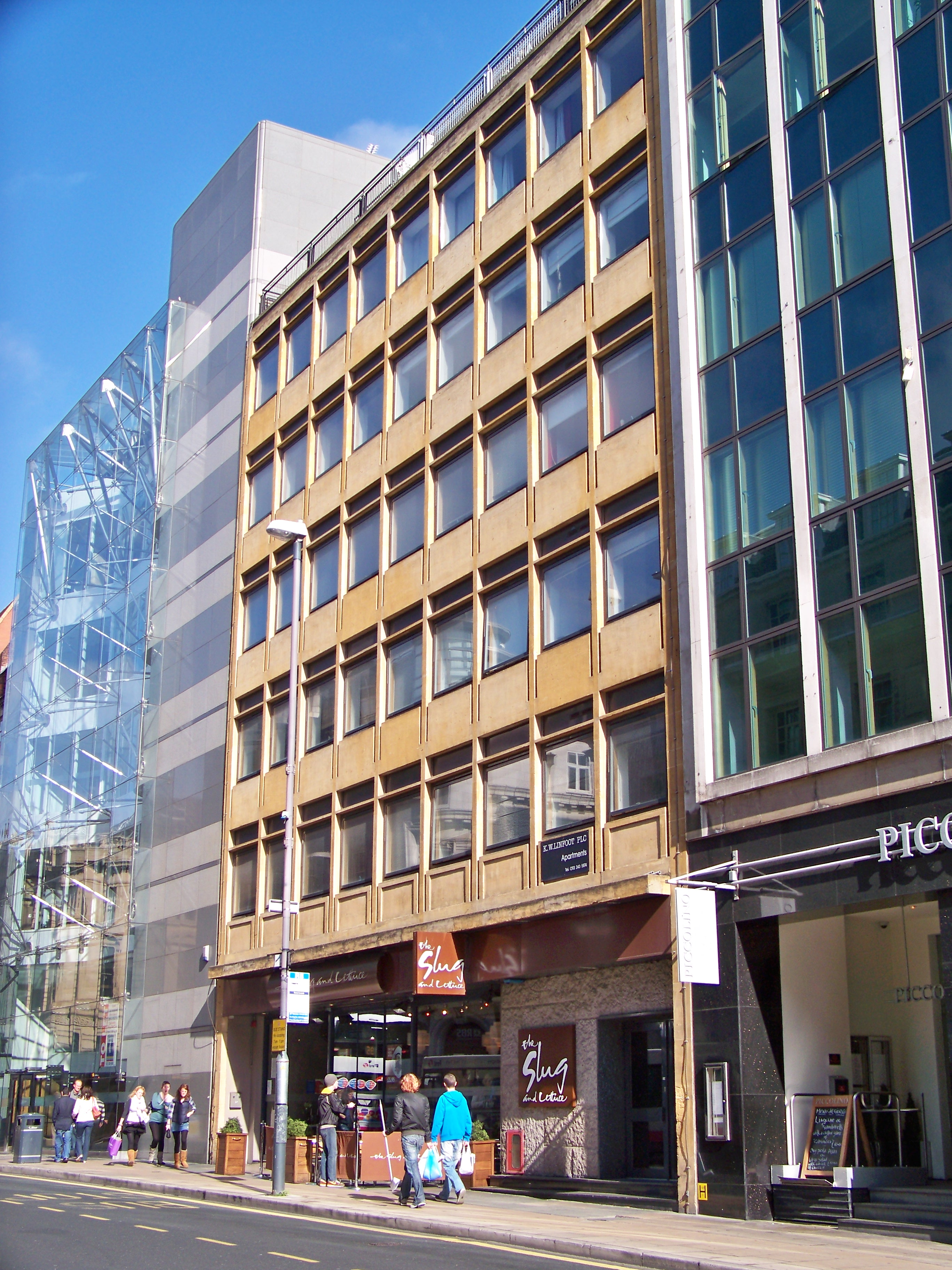
Slug and Lettuce in Leeds

The group has its origins in the Laurel Pub Company, which was owned by Robert and Vincent Tchenguiz, two Iranian businessmen. It originally owned the Hogshead pub chain. In May 2004, it sold 432 neighbourhood pubs for £654m to Greene King.

Robert Tchenguiz's R20 bought the company for £151m in November 2004. In June 2005, it bought the Slug and Lettuce and Bar Med chains for £80m when the Surrey-based SFI Group went into administration. It also bought the Yates's chain for £202m, with many becoming Slug and Lettuce outlets. In February 2006, it sold the Forno Vivo and Santa Fe chains.

In April 2007, it bought the La Tasca chain for £123m, but in 2011, La Tasca demerged into a standalone business under La Tasca Holdings Ltd.

=== Financial difficulties ===
On 27 March 2008, the Laurel Pub Company went into administration; this was thought to be due to high rents. R20, Robert Tchenguiz's company, with its 378 pubs, bought the company back via pre-packaged insolvency, with most of the former company becoming the Bay Restaurant Group on 28 March 2008, financed by Kaupthing Bank. In October 2008, Kaupthing collapsed during the Icelandic financial crisis.

In February 2009, Tchenguiz was sued by the Kaupthing bank for an unpaid overdraft of £643m. He was relieved of his involvement with the company by the banks to which he owed debts through an offshore company called Oscatello based on the British Virgin Islands. On 27 July 2009, Bay Restaurant Group was bought by two banks, Commerzbank of Germany, and Kaupthing Bank of Iceland, in a move to recoup debts from him. That was done via a debt-for-equity swap, where Kaupthing became the major shareholder, and the company's debt was reduced by around £150m.

In May 2010, Bay Restaurant Group was put up for sale, with Tragus Ltd a potential buyer, for around £70m. In September 2010, it sold Ha Ha Bar and Grill (22 pubs) to Mitchells & Butlers for £19.5m, which saw the disappearance of the brand, with 12 becoming All Bar One.

Hogshead and Yates's are now owned by the Town & City Pub Company, which is based in the same building as the Bay Restaurant Group. This company was established on the same day Tchenguiz, and is the other part of the former Laurel Pub Company, and also owned by Kaupthing. The Town & City Pub Company bought the Slug and Lettuce chain (82 pubs) in February 2010 so it is still based in the same building.

== Structure ==
The headquarters is situated in the south of Luton off the dual-carriageway Airport Way (A1081), close to junction 10a of the M1 and Luton Airport Parkway railway station, opposite Lower Kidney Wood near Luton Hoo.
