= Nags Head, York =

Listed pub in York, England

Nags Head
- The pub in 2026
- Former names: Nag's Head Inn; Sociale
- Alternative names: Nag's Head

General information
- Type: Public house; originally a house
- Location: 100 Micklegate, York, England
- Coordinates: 53.9569°N 1.0896°W
- Year built: c. 1530; 496 years ago
- Renovated: c. 1700 (extended); 18th century (refronted and remodelled); Early 19th and 20th century (altered and extended); 2016 (refurbished)
- Owner: Stonegate

Design and construction
- Designations

Listed Building – Grade II
- Official name: The Nags Head public house
- Designated: 19 August 1971
- Reference no.: 1257297

Website
- Official website

The Nags Head is a Grade II listed public house on Micklegate in York, England. The building originated as a house, with a front range added around 1530 to a 14th‑century rear range, and was extended about 1700; by the mid‑18th century it was operating as the Nag's Head Inn. It was refronted and remodelled in the 18th century, with further alterations in the early 19th and 20th centuries. The site entered the Central Historic Core conservation area in 1968. The premises were refurbished in early 2016 and briefly traded as Sociale before reverting to their original name later that year; as of August 2025 the freehold is owned by Stonegate.

== History ==
Standing on Micklegate, the building originated as a house, with a front range added around 1530 to a 14th‑century rear range. An extension was built about 1700, and by the mid‑18th century it was operating as the Nag's Head Inn. It was refronted and remodelled in the 18th century, with further alterations and extensions made in the early 19th and 20th centuries.

In the mid‑18th century the property was owned by Isabella Stockdale, who left it to her relatives Jane and Sarah Coghill. By 1777 the sisters were married to John Cawthery and William Powell of Leeds. In 1785 the innholder was George Smithson. Between 1815 and 1823 the premises were sold by William Stockdale Powell, the son of Sarah and William Powell, to trustees acting for John Fryers Kilby, a brewer. At that time the holding included several buildings running north towards Toft Green, formerly used as a malt kiln and stables. The main house was then trading as the Nag's Head, occupied by John Smith, and previously by Robert Mortimer and later Francis Lumb. From 1785 until after 1850 the Nag's Head also incorporated No. 98.

In 1968 the site was included within the newly established Central Historic Core conservation area, and on 19 August 1971, the Nags Head was designated a Grade II listed building. It stands between No. 98, also Grade II listed, and Nos. 102–104, listed at Grade II*.

The premises were fully refurbished in early 2016 and reopened under the name Sociale. It closed again in December that year, reverting to its original name and reopening in January 2017. As of August 2025, the freehold is owned by Stonegate.

== Architecture ==
Pub sign in 2024

The building has a timber‑framed core and a later painted brick front, with the rear finished in painted render. It has steep slate roofs with brick chimneys. The front section is three bays deep, with what may have been a two‑bay hall behind and an additional wing in the inner corner. The street front has three storeys and an attic, with a single window and a gabled roof. The entrance has a simple framed surround with a projecting hood, and to its right is a modern three‑light window set above a tiled base. The first floor has a bow window with three sashes, and the second floor has two small sash windows, with a two‑light casement in the attic. The rear has three gabled walls, now mostly hidden by a later single‑storey addition.

=== Interior ===
Inside the front part of the building, some of the early timber posts and beams remain visible, and on the second floor parts of the studded side walls can be seen, crossed by long straight braces. The roof is formed with simple rafters resting on side purlins, supported by curved struts rising from the main beams, and there may be additional members above the ceiling.

In the rear range, the main posts are also exposed. One roof truss has a strongly curved main beam carrying a central post and two angled braces, though the upper section is hidden. Another truss has lost its main beam and the supports beneath it. None of the original fireplaces survive, and the staircase is partly modern and partly dates from around 1840.

== See also ==
- Listed buildings in York (within the city walls, southern part)
