= Missoula (nightclub) =

English nightclub

- Location within Durham, England
- Former names: Slug and Lettuce
- Address: Unit 7 Walkergate; Durham; England
- Coordinates: 54.778843°N 1.575380°W
- Owner: Stonegate Pub Company
- Current use: Public house

Construction
- Years active: 2016-2018

Missoula was a nightclub in Unit 7 of the Walkergate retail complex in Durham, England that opened on 1 October 2016. The venue was used as a Slug and Lettuce branded pub until August 2016. Owners Stonegate Pub Company spent £385,000 to renovate the nightclub before its opening. Steve Rucastle was the general manager in 2016.

On 11 October 2017 the club launched a new Wednesday night event called "Game Over". On Wednesday 14 February 2018 a crowd control barrier outside the nightclub fell and fatally struck queuing customer, local student, Olivia Burt (aged 20), who was queuing to enter. Durham Member of Parliament Roberta Blackman-Woods said that she has raised safety concerns about the nightclub and had received complaints about the safety of the crowd-control barriers from local taxi drivers. Blackman-Woods stated that taxi drivers had reported seeing the crowd-control barriers fall on the nightclub's customers.

At a May 2018 municipal alcohol licensing review, nightclub owners Stonegate were permitted to retain their license to sell alcohol at the venue, but obliged to submit a revised operational plan. In 2019, the nightclub's owners applied to revert the venue's name back to The Slug and Lettuce. By 2023, the venue was back operating under the Slug and Lettuce brand.

On 7 July 2023 the Stonegate Pub Company was found guilty of breaking safety legislation in 2018, and fined £1.56 million.
