= Yates's =

English pub chain

Yates
- Company type: Subsidiary
- Industry: Hospitality
- Founded: 1884
- Founder: Peter and Simon Yates
- Headquarters: Porter Tun House, 500 Capability Green, Luton, Bedfordshire, LU1 3LS
- Number of locations: 37
- Area served: UK
- Parent: Yates Group plc (1986–2004); Laurel Pub Company (2004–11); Stonegate Pub Company (2011–)
- Subsidiaries: Ha! Ha! Bar & Canteen (former)
- Website: Yates

Yates's (/ˈjeɪtsiz/) is an English pub chain. It was founded as Yates's Wine Lodge in Oldham, Lancashire, by Peter and Simon Yates in 1884.

== History ==
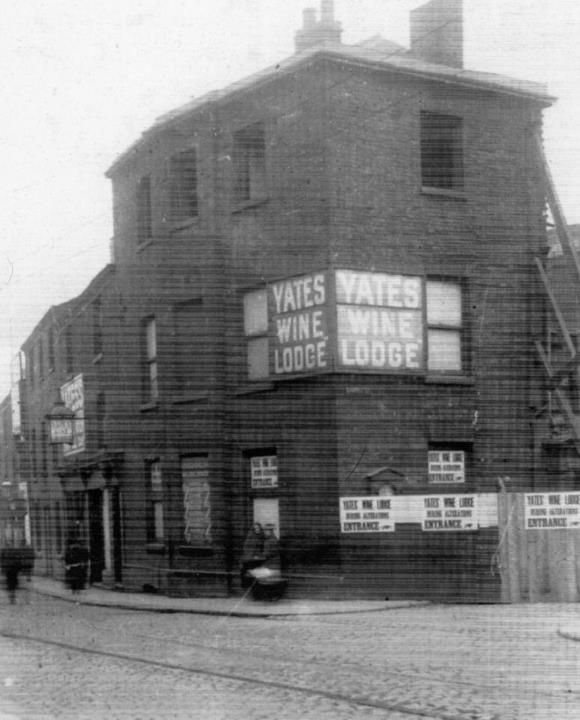
Yates Wine Lodge, High Street, Oldham (1927)

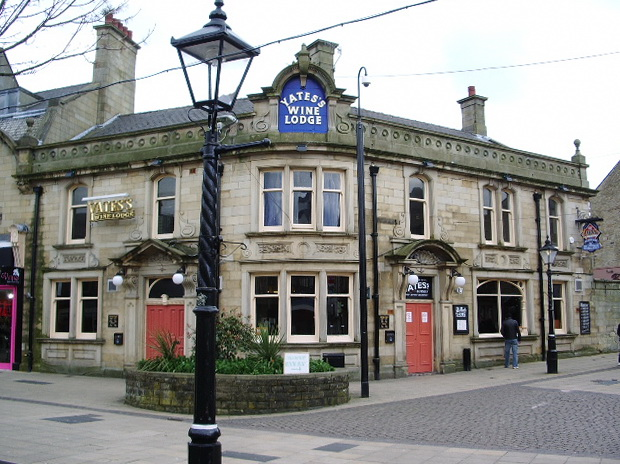
Yates's, St James's Street, Burnley

Yates is Britain's oldest pub chain. Its motto was moderation is true temperance. The founders, brothers Peter and Simon Yates were from Preston. Peter was sent to Spain to learn about wine. Simon went to the United States to learn about business methods.

The first Yates Wine Lodge opened in Oldham in 1884.

== Ownership ==
=== Public company ===
On 23 July 1994, Yates became a public company owned by the Yates Group PLC (Yates Brothers Wine Lodges PLC). The Yates Group also owned Ha! Ha! Bar & Canteen and operated pubs under the Blob Shop and Addison's name. In the late 1990s, its share price rose to reach a high of 550p in 1998.

In June 2001, the Yates Group entered takeover talks with Luminar Group. In July 2001, it withdrew from takeover talks and said it would instead sell off 25 of its pubs, later putting 18 of them up for sale. On 1 November 2001 the Yates Group sold eight pubs to Morrells for £4 million, with four being in Grantham, Slough, Solihull and Tunbridge Wells.

In October 2003, Yates sold its Aussie White fortified brand to Halewood International for £1 million.

=== Management buyout ===
In June 2004, when 30% of the company was owned by the Dickson and Yates family, the Yates Group had a management buyout offer (MBO) funded by GI Partners. At the time, the company was valued at £98.4 million (140p a share) and employed 4,000 people. While GI Partners only received 16% of acceptances from shareholders (not the 90% it was looking for), the bid proceeded in October 2004.

=== Takeover by Laurel Pub Company ===
By 2005, the Yates Group had grown to 125 Yates pubs and 25 Ha! Ha! bars. In April 2005, the company was approached by the Tchenguiz-owned Laurel Pub Company and a £200-million merger was completed on 20 May 2005. A few weeks later, Laurel bought many of the sites belonging to the bankrupt SFI Group PLC, which owned Slug and Lettuce.

=== Administration ===
On 27 March 2008, Laurel was put into administration.

=== Takeover by Stonegate Pub company ===
In 2011 European private equity firm TDR capital announced the merger between pub companies Stonegate and Town & City.

== Business ==
There are still more than 70 Yates pubs or bars in the UK, although there is no longer one in Oldham. The site of the original Yates Wine Lodge is now a McDonald's and is marked by a plaque on Oldham High Street. Some Yates have been converted to Slug and Lettuce pubs in recent years.

Yates Australian White continues to be made by Halewood International and is sold in 35-centilitre, 70-centilitre and 1.5-litre containers.
