= Jongleurs =

Jongleurs may refer to:

- Jongleur, another word for a medieval minstrel
- Jongleurs (comedy club)
