= Regent Inns =

Regent Inns Plc
- Company type: Public (LSE:REG)
- Industry: Bars and Restaurants
- Founded: 1977
- Headquarters: Borehamwood, England
- Key people: Bob Ivell, John Leslie, Michael Foster, Simon Kaye
- Revenue: £148.9 million (2007)
- Operating income: £11.5 million (2007)
- Subsidiaries: Jongleurs, Walkabout, Old Orleans
- Website: www.regentinns.co.uk

Regent Inns was the British parent company of Walkabout, Jongleurs/Bar Risa and Old Orleans chains. It went into administration in October 2009. The part-time executive chairman was Bob Ivell.

== Brands ==
Jongleurs is a chain of sixteen comedy clubs in the United Kingdom, established in 1983. It is often twinned with Bar Risa or Walkabout.

Old Orleans was a chain of 26 themed-dining bar/restaurants acquired from Punch Taverns in summer 2006 for £26 million. The brand was similar to T.G.I. Friday's as it provided food in the styles of the American South, Creole and Cajun Cultures. Old Orleans restaurants ceased operation in late 2011.

Walkabout (or sometimes The Walkabout) is a chain of Australian themed bars operating in the UK. There are now 36 Walkabout venues in the UK. To keep with the Australian theme, most of the bar staff employed at Walkabout Inns are Australian. Walkabout Inns also serve food, with a menu offering Australian-themed foods such as kangaroo and crocodile fillets.

Surfer's Paradise is a club operating in the same building as Walkabout, with the two parts operated as separate entities or together, normally with Walkabout playing pop music or hosting live bands and Surfer's Paradise harder dance music. An example of this, is the branch of Walkabout in Croydon town centre.
