= Robert Tchenguiz =

British businessman

Robert Tchenguiz رابرت چنگیز
- Born: Robert Tchenguiz; 9 September 1960 (age 66); Tehran, Iran
- Citizenship: British
- Occupation: Property developer
- Title: Co-chairman, Rotch Property Group
- Spouse(s): Heather Bird (m. 2005; div. 2019)
- Children: 2
- Parent(s): Violet Khadouri; Victor Khadouri
- Relatives: Vincent Tchenguiz (brother); Lisa Tchenguiz (sister)

Robert Tchenguiz (born 9 September 1960) is a British entrepreneur, property investor, activist shareholder and securities dealer. The younger brother of Vincent Tchenguiz, he undertook a series of corporate deals, focusing particularly on property assets associated with UK pub and supermarket chains, during the 2000s. However, the value of some of his investments plunged during the 2008 financial crisis, exacerbated by the collapse of his major financial backer, Iceland's Kaupthing Bank. His and his brother's businesses were also the targets of a UK Serious Fraud Office inquiry and various lawsuits.

== Early life ==
Tchenguiz was born in Tehran, Iran, to an Iraqi-Jewish family, the son of Victor and Violet Khadouri. His family left Iraq in 1948 and settled in Iran, where his father, a jeweler, worked for the Shah and ran the country's mint. He also changed the family surname from Khadouri to Tchenguiz.

In 1979 the family moved to England after the Iranian revolution. He has one brother, Vincent Tchenguiz, and one sister, Lisa Tchenguiz (formerly married to BBC Radio 1 disc jockey Gary Davies and then to South African-born Del Monte CEO Vivian Imerman).

== Career ==
Starting with an investment in a Hammersmith office block, the Tchenguiz family established Rotch Property Group, a highly leveraged business that "typically buys properties let long-term to blue-chip clients" and "relies on property values rising in a low-interest-rate environment". In a booming real estate market, they also applied an American financial engineering strategy of securitization: borrowing large sums against future cashflows from company assets, enabling them to access more debt, and on better terms (and much of it - reportedly over £2 billion - from Iceland's Kaupthing Bank), than had been thought possible. Other businesses included the R20 investment vehicle and investment company London & Boston.

=== High street and pub chain investments ===
In 2001, the Tchenguiz brothers and Vivian Imerman, supported by a £190 million loan from German investment bank WestLB, backed a 2001 management buyout of distiller Whyte & Mackay (in 2005, they bought remaining interests in the firm before selling the company to India-based United Spirits Limited for £595 million in 2007). Also in 2001, Robert Tchenguiz tabled a £310 million bid for Shell Mex House, a 1930s Art Deco building overlooking the Thames next to London's Savoy Hotel, and in 2003 bid to buy London's Selfridges but later (July 2003) withdrew his offer before launching bids to buy the Pubmaster pub chain and the Odeon cinema chain. After selling his Pubmaster stake to Punch Taverns, in 2004 he established the Globe Pub Company. He acquired 364 pubs from Spirit Group, in a deal worth £345 million, and also bought the Laurel Pub Company for £150 million. In 2005 he bought the Yates's high street bar group for £200 million and then spent £80 million for 98 pubs from the SFI Group, which operated the Slug and Lettuce chain. Also in 2005, he was part of a consortium targeting the Somerfield supermarket chain.

In 2006, he led a consortium targeting the Mitchells & Butlers pub chain. While the initial bid was rebuffed, Tchenguiz continued to pursue M&B in 2007 only for M&B management to postpone a proposed property joint venture due to a credit crunch heralding the 2008 financial crisis. Deteriorating market conditions saw £225 million wiped off the value of Tchenguiz's investments in a single day in November 2007, and by January 2008, collapsed corporate deals and plunging stock market values were reported to have cut the paper value of three Tchenguiz investments (M&B, supermarket chain Sainsbury's and computer games publisher SCi Entertainment) by over £560m in less than 12 weeks. In March 2008, Tchenguiz's Laurel Pub Company collapsed into administration, but around 239 of pubs and restaurants were immediately acquired from the administrators in a deal financed by between £50 million and £60 million of credit provided by Tchenguiz. He continued to build his stake in M&B in May 2008, but was reportedly sitting on a hefty loss as M&B shares, once trading at nearly 900 p, had fallen to 344 p. In May 2008, Tchenguiz - holding 27% of the company's shares - got M&B agreement to place property interests into a tax-efficient real estate investment trust once credit market conditions were favourable for refinancing.

=== Financial losses ===
In October 2008, under pressure from Kaupthing Bank, which had backed many of Tchenguiz's investments, he was forced to sell off holdings in M&B, Sainsbury's, SCi Entertainment and other businesses, incurring substantial losses estimated at over £800 million. And in February 2009, Kaupthing announced it was suing Oscatello Investments, a British Virgin Islands-based holding company controlled by Tchenguiz, in relation to an unpaid overdraft of £643m. In May 2009, Kaupthing followed up with a £180 million claim against Tchenguiz for proceeds from the sale of Somerfield, eventually settled in June 2010 with the Tchenguiz Discretionary Trust surrendering control of £137 million to Kaupthing's administrators. Meanwhile, in April 2009, Tchenguiz's Globe Pub Company faced administration after defaulting on a loan payment; the chain's 421 outlets were bought from the receivers by Heineken in October 2009.

=== SFO and other legal disputes ===
In the wake of the collapse of Kaupthing Bank, Robert Tchenguiz was suspected of fraudulent dealings and was arrested in a dawn raid in 2011, but the investigation ended in 2012 with the Serious Fraud Office (SFO) citing "insufficient evidence", and no indictment was ever brought. In fact, Tchenguiz lost millions of pounds in Kaupthing's collapse. Tchenguiz sued the Serious Fraud Office (SFO) for false imprisonment and damages to his businesses. Due to mishandling of the inquiry, the court had already ordered the SFO to pay 80% of Tchenguiz's legal expenses in the matter. In 2014, the SFO settled with Tchenguiz for £1.5 million.

However, Tchenguiz also took legal action against Grant Thornton and partners at the firm, who he claimed had misled the SFO into investigating him and brother Vincent, though the dispute reportedly also created a rift between the brothers due to a legal row over administration of the Tchenguiz Family Trust; main beneficiary Vincent was accused by Robert of making false representations "of a serious nature" about him to Grant Thornton. The court action was eventually discontinued by Tchenguiz in October 2018. The judge said all defendants could leave the court "with their reputation completely intact" as Tchenguiz's allegations had "completely failed". While the court could not compel Tchenguiz to apologise, "it records unequivocally that it is warranted." However, Tchenguiz said "I am definitely not providing an apology."

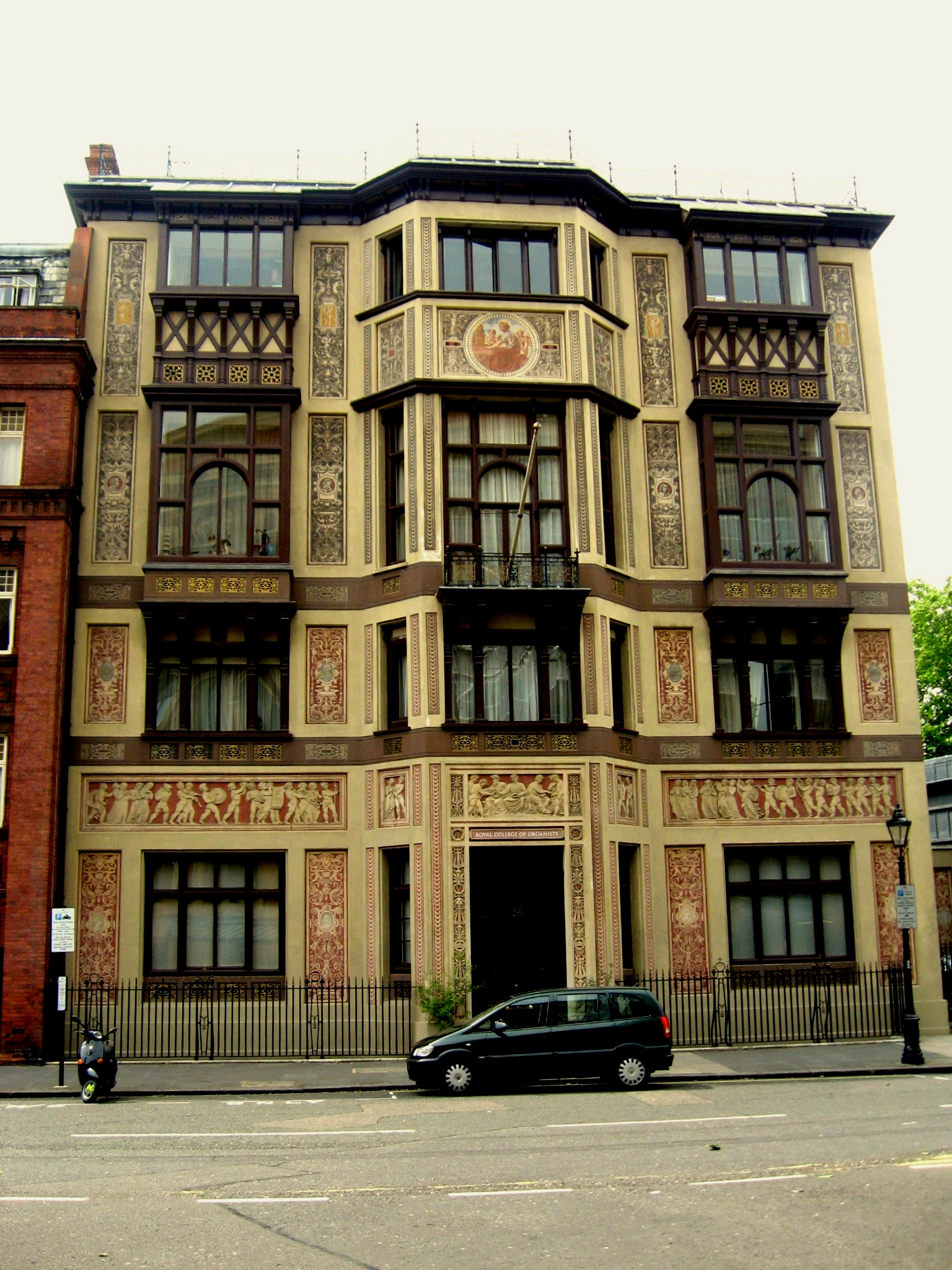
Tchenguiz's home, the former Royal College of Organists building, 2009

A legal dispute relating to Investec Trust Guernsey's handling of the Tchenguiz Discretionary Trust ended in an April 2018 judgement in favour of the Guernsey-based business, with Tchenguiz threatened with loss of his Kensington home, which formerly housed the Royal College of Organists, as a result - though the threat was later reported to have been resolved.

In July 2018, Tchenguiz was said by a High Court judge to have lied regarding a €2 billion Santander Bank deal in a dispute involving Edgeworth Capital, a Tchenguiz-owned Luxembourg-registered company, and Aabar Investments, an Abu Dhabi investment business. Finding in favour of Aabar, the judge said Tchenguiz was "prepared to say whatever he thought would assist Edgeworth's case, without any regard for its truth."

In May 2025, Tchenguiz's company sued its former Spanish legal advisers Cuatrecasas for €213 million, alleging professional negligence over a property deal involving Santander Bank's Madrid headquarters.

=== Resumption of activist shareholder and property activities ===
In September 2019, Tchenguiz sold one of his properties, the Quarry House office building in Leeds, to Legal & General for £246 million, part of an effort to raise funds to invest in new UK properties.

During 2019, Tchenguiz built up a substantial shareholding in bus and rail company FirstGroup, and in November 2019 pushed for the group to be broken up. In December 2019, FirstGroup announced it was considering a sale of its North American businesses, leading Tchenguiz, holding 4.7% of the company, to claim a shareholders victory. However, following the March 2020 stock market crash due to the COVID-19 pandemic, Tchnenguiz's £28 million stake in the group was sold. It was later reported that his investment had been funded by loans from City brokers, including InterTrader, IG Group and CMC Markets, who called in the loans then sold the shares after Tchenguiz did not repay the loans. CMC began legal action against Tchenguiz for repayment of a £1.1 million debt. In July 2022, the High Court ordered Tchenguiz to pay £1.31 million to CMC; Tchenguiz planned to appeal against the ruling. His FirstGroup foray also led Tchenguiz to be sued for £2 million by spread betting platform Spreadex in May 2023. In November 2023, Tchenguiz settled his FirstGroup-related dispute with Entain, the former owner of Gibraltar-based InterTrader. In London's High Court in June 2024, Tchenguiz contested IG Group's claims against him regarding a FirstGroup-related £6.5 million spreadbet, but on 1 August 2024, the court found IG Index had correctly identified him as a professional investor meaning he owed the spreadbet business £8m.

In November 2019, Tchenguiz campaigned to restructure AIM-listed real estate lender Urban Exposure in which his company, R20 Advisory, had built a 12.6% stake. In March 2020, under pressure from Tchenguiz, Urban Exposure was set to break itself up and sell its constituent parts.

In May 2020, Tchenguiz submitted plans to Westminster City Council to convert the former headquarters of MI5 (Leconfield House in Curzon Street, Mayfair) into a 65-bedroom private members' hotel. Tchenguiz had bought the building for his Rotch property business in 2004 for about £140 million. The council, backed by the Planning Inspectorate, refused his plans, and in October 2022 Tchenguiz lodged an appeal. In February 2023, Tchenguiz amended his proposals, planning a medical and diagnostic facility instead of a private members' hotel, then, in July 2024, a £450m ultra-luxury residential building. In December 2025, Tchenguiz was reported to be working with former prime minister Liz Truss on using the Curzon Street premises to house a private members' club, the Leconfield, described as "strategic nexus for a global network of pro-growth leaders". The proposed development was approved by Westminster City Council in May 2026.

== Personal life ==
Tchenguiz once dated model Caprice Bourret and was close to Diana, Princess of Wales.

In 2005, he married his longtime girlfriend, American Heather Bird; they have two children. Though separated, they lived in different parts of the same house by the Royal Albert Hall in Kensington, London. His girlfriend, Julia Dybowska, also lived in the house. Details about his domestic arrangements were described in a May 2018 BBC documentary The Rise and Fall of the Playboy Billionaire, prompting Tchenguiz to threaten legal action against the BBC, and to appoint former Bell Pottinger CEO James Henderson as his PR advisor.

In January 2018, Robert Tchenguiz was reported to have been on the invitation list to a controversial Presidents Club dinner in London.

Tchenguiz and Bird divorced in 2019. Bird took their two children to see her family in the US in late 2020 and did not return, prompting Tchenguiz to start a legal action under the Hague Convention alleging Bird had abducted the children. In December 2021, Bird defended her actions in a filing at the district Missoula division court in Montana, saying their 14-year-old son feared returning to the UK because he would be forced to have sex with a prostitute to "make him a man". Bird also said her son had witnessed what she described as "years of intense psychological abuse" by Tchenguiz.

In March 2022, Tchenguiz won a court ruling against Westminster City Council after anti-terrorism traffic arrangements near the Royal Albert Hall restricted access to his home. The High Court ruled that the measures unduly interfered with Tchenguiz's private life, preventing visitors to his home by car between noon and midnight.

Tchenguiz owns a 45.6 metres (150 ft) superyacht, My Little Violet, built by Abeking & Rasmussen and moored in Cannes.

In 2025, R20 Advisory, founded by Tchenguiz in 2002, made two separate donations of £50,000 to Nigel Farage’s Reform UK party.
