= Admiral Vernon, Dagenham =

Listed pub in Dagenham, London

The Admiral Vernon
- The pub in 2026

General information
- Type: Public house
- Architectural style: Neo-Tudor
- Location: 141 Broad Street, Dagenham, England
- Coordinates: 51.53556°N 0.15136°E
- Year built: c. 1939; 87 years ago
- Client: Courage & Co
- Owner: Stonegate

Design and construction
- Architect: H. M. Kirby (probable)
- Designations

Listed Building – Grade II
- Official name: Admiral Vernon public house, including freestanding signpost, garage and rear wall
- Designated: 7 June 2022
- Reference no.: 1475582

The Admiral Vernon is a Grade II listed pub on Broad Street in Dagenham, London. Built around 1939 for Courage & Co on the south‑eastern edge of the Becontree Estate, it is thought to have been designed by H. M. Kirby, who produced several pubs for the brewery during the 1930s. The interior has changed little since completion and is rated three stars on the Campaign for Real Ale's National Inventory for its outstanding national historic importance. As of December 2024, the freehold is owned by Stonegate.

== History ==
The Admiral Vernon was built around 1939 for Courage & Co brewery on the south‑eastern edge of London County Council's Becontree Estate in Dagenham. It is likely to have been designed by H. M. Kirby, who produced several pubs for the brewery during the 1930s, including the similar Eagle and Child in Brentwood, completed by 1938 and demolished in 2021, and the Surrey Commercial Dock Tavern in Rotherhithe, built in 1933, later renamed The Aardvark and then trading as the Orange Bull before its demolition in 2018. The pub's name refers to Edward Vernon (1684–1757), a Royal Navy officer who became an admiral in 1745.

The Admiral Vernon has changed little since it was completed in the late 1930s. Apart from the removal of two internal screens, one in the former private bar and another in the games room, the original layout is largely intact. The off‑sales shop is thought to have closed in the 1950s or 1960s and later operated as a flower shop. It is now used for storage.

On 7 June 2022, the Admiral Vernon was designated a Grade II listed building. It is regarded by the Campaign for Real Ale (CAMRA) as having an interior of "outstanding national historic importance" and is rated three stars on its National Inventory of Historic Pub Interiors.

As of December 2024, the pub's freehold is owned by Stonegate. The pub was used as a filming location for the 2025 film Marching Powder, which stars Danny Dyer.

== Architecture ==
=== Exterior ===
The Morland Road façade in 2026

The building is constructed in brick, with cream faience at street level and rendered upper walls that include applied timber features. Its roof is finished with plain tiles and areas of copper sheeting. It stands on a corner plot set at an angle to Broad Street and Morland Road, with a forecourt at the junction and a small garden at the rear. A timber sign stands in the forecourt, and a brick wall marks the boundary of the rear garden. The two upper floors contain living quarters, and a cellar lies beneath the servery.

The exterior reflects the neo‑Tudor, or "Brewers' Tudor", style popular with breweries in the 1930s, shown in the applied timbering, leaded windows, Tudor‑arched openings and tall grouped chimneys. The Broad Street front is arranged symmetrically, with a recessed centre gable framed by paired chimney stacks and flanked by two projecting gabled wings. The north wing is attached to the former off‑sales shop, and a single‑storey function room and detached garage stand at the eastern end. The doorways and windows to the bar rooms remain in their original positions, indicating the former public, private and saloon bars, with a further entrance to a rear function room marked by a faience Tudor arch decorated with Tudor roses and foliage. Applied timbering continues across the first floor and the central attic gable. The gabled ends of the wings contain oriel windows with copper‑clad hoods embossed with the Courage cockerel emblem. Leaded casements are used throughout, with coloured upper panes to the bar windows, and the entrance lamps are later replacements.

The rear of the building is simpler, built entirely in brick, with steel external stairs leading from the publican's accommodation down to the roof of the single‑storey games room. Leaded casements continue across this elevation, and part‑glazed doors open to the garden from the games room, the servery and the function room.

=== Interior ===
The interior is arranged around three main rooms: a public bar to the left, a central saloon bar, and a function room to the right. The public bar has two areas, the rear formerly used as a games room and once divided by a folding screen, of which only the upper section remains. Both spaces have three‑quarter height panelling and a plaster frieze with hop‑garland decoration. The original counter survives, with its terrazzo base, panelled front and original top, and the bar back combines shelving, leaded glass panels giving borrowed light to the publican's office, and cupboards below. A glazed serving screen stands at the rear for the former games area, and a dartboard cupboard is built into the panelling. Two timber fireplace surrounds remain, though both are blocked. A low service hatch survives between the public bar and the former private bar. The women's and men's toilets retain their original tiling, and the men's also keeps its original urinals.

The saloon bar was originally two rooms, indicated by the remaining upper portion of a dividing screen. Its counter matches that of the public bar, and the bar back is panelled with barley‑twist detailing, though part of the lower shelving has been replaced by fridges. A tiled fireplace with a timber Tudor‑arched surround stands beside the former screen. The room has the same panelling and decorative frieze as the public bar. Behind the servery, two small office spaces survive with original panelling, doors and leaded and frosted glazing.

A complete folding screen separates the saloon bar from the function room, retaining its original "saloon bar" sign. The counter and bar back in this room follow the same pattern as the other bars, with panelled fronts, terrazzo bases and fitted shelving. The panelling and plaster frieze continue throughout, and a stage has been added at the east end. A men's toilet with a small lobby is reached from both rooms and keeps its original doors with leaded glazing, urinals and tiling. All fixed seating is modern.
