= Michael Morley =

Michael Morley may refer to:

- Michael Morley (musician), New Zealand musician, member of The Dead C
- Michael D. Morley (1930–2020), American mathematician and model theorist
- Mike Morley (born 1946), American golfer
- Michael Morley (athlete), Australian Paralympic athlete
- Michael Morley (politician), member of the Utah House of Representatives
- Michael Morley (banker) (born 1957), British banker
- Michael Morley, an alternate personality of the vampire Caleb Morley, on Port Charles

== See also ==
- Michelson–Morley experiment, a groundbreaking experiment in physics
