= Vivian Imerman =

South African businessman (born 1955)

Vivian Saul Imerman
- Born: 21 September 1955 (age 70); Johannesburg, South Africa
- Occupation: businessman
- Spouses: Gina Gervis; Lisa Tchenguiz; (divorced)
- Children: four --three with Gervis --one with Tchenguiz
- Parent: Samuel Imerman

Vivian Saul Imerman (born 21 September 1955) is a South-African born businessman and former CEO of Del Monte International and Whyte and Mackay. He was nicknamed 'The Man from Del Monte.'

== Early life and education ==
Imerman was born to a South African Jewish family in Johannesburg, South Africa. His grandfather was a Russian-Jewish émigré who went to South Africa after fleeing the Russian Revolution. His father, Samuel Imerman, was a chemist. He attended college seeking a degree in business law but never completed his studies. He was conscripted into the South African Army during Apartheid and fought in the South African Border War. Thereafter he worked for his father's chemical brokering business and then started his own company purchasing surplus chemicals and reselling them.

== Career ==
In the early 1980s, he expanded his business, first, into the purchase of damaged goods (which he would then repair and resell for a profit), then, into the distribution of branded pharmaceuticals. The pharmaceutical business boomed and, in 1987, Imerman listed his company on the Johannesburg Stock Exchange. He then expanded into food distribution, listing an additional three companies on the stock exchange in South Africa. During the late 1980s, when Western companies were divesting themselves of assets in South Africa due to Apartheid, he purchased assets at prices far below their real value. In 1989, he bought the South African assets of both Nabisco and the Ferro chemical group. The Nabisco purchase gave him the option of purchasing Del Monte International, which he did in 1993, backed by an investment from South African mining company Anglo American plc; he later purchased 50% of Del Monte Asia. In 1995, he listed Del Monte International on the Singapore Stock Exchange, tripling the value of the business to £400 million. In 1999, he sold his remaining stake in the fruit company and moved to London.

In London, he met brothers Robert Tchenguiz and Vincent Tchenguiz; they partnered and purchased a minority interest in the distiller Kyndal (now Whyte and Mackay) with a £190 million loan from German investment bank WestLB. Immerman served, first, as executive chairman, and then as CEO; there, he administered an aggressive cost-cutting program, and increased his ownership interest, from 35 percent to 60 percent, by buying out 60 shareholder employees. In 2005, Imerman and the Tchenguiz brothers purchased the remaining interest in the firm, then, in 2007, sold the company to Indian-based United Spirits Limited for £595 million (then, US$1.2 billion), of which Imerman received £380 million. Imerman leads Vasari Global, a specialist Global Consumer Goods Investor, and Vasari Beverages, a leading frontier and emerging market alcoholic beverages investor that has deployed more than $250m in capital investment between 2013 and 2018. In Ethiopia, Vasari Beverages owns 98% of the controlling offshore company of Dashen Brewery, one of Ethiopia's largest breweries and Rorank Distillery one of East Africa's largest distillers. In 2016, Vasari Beverages acquired the operational assets of South African drinks firm KWV for $85m one of the leading and oldest spirits and wine producers in South Africa.

In 2019, Vasari Beverages announced an additional $100m capital raise. Pan-African investment bank RMB served as the sole mandated lead arranger and funder. The funds will be used to double production capacity of Dashen to 5 million hectolitres of beer per annum, and triple the production capacity of Rorank to 25 million litres of alcohol per annum.

Imerman appeared on the Sunday Times Rich List in 2018, with a reported fortune of £390 million.

In 2025, the footwear brand Moreschi was acquired by the Imerman Family Office in partnership with the Italian company GLAM. Bianca Ladow, daughter of Vivian Imerman, currently serves as a director for the Imerman Family Office, GLAM, and Moreschi.

== Personal life ==
He married South African Gina Gervis in 1981; they had three children.

In 2001, he married Lisa Tchenguiz, sister of his business partners Robert Tchenguiz and Vincent Tchenguiz. They separated in December 2008.

Imerman is now married to Gina Gervis, his first wife and mother of his three grown-up children.
