= Kev Orkian =

British comedian

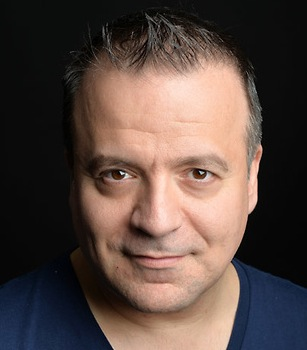
- Born: Kevork Kapikyan; 13 February 1974 (age 52); Edmonton, Greater London, England
- Education: Brunel University
- Occupation: Comedian
- Website: www.kevlive.com

Kev Orkian (born Kevork Kapikyan; 13 February 1974) is a British-Armenian comedian. He has performed around the world from New York City, Los Angeles and Toronto to Dubai, Oman and Australia. Orkian has been compared to the likes of Victor Borge, Les Dawson and Dudley Moore.

== Early life ==
Orkian was born in Edmonton, North London to Armenian parents. He attended Barnet College. He went on to study at Brunel University.

== Career ==
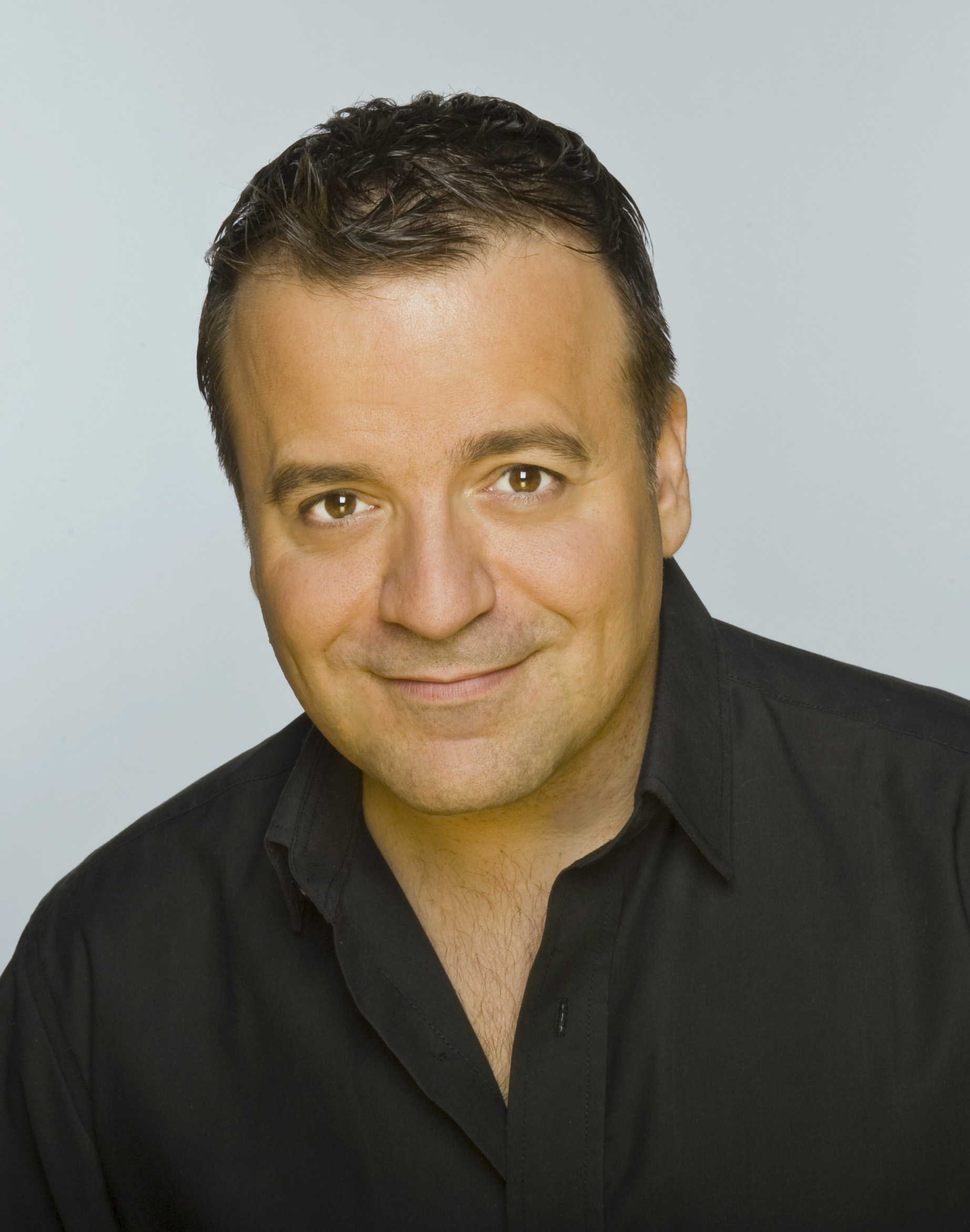
Kev Orkian (2011)

Between 2003 and 2009, Orkian spent time touring the UK as the support act for some of the biggest names in British comedy and has previously starred in West-End London musicals including Fame, Happy Days and Boogie Nights alongside Dancing on Ice winner and Emmerdale actress Hayley Tamaddon.

In 2009 Kev Orkian became a regular on the UK comedy circuit performing at well-known clubs such as Jongleurs where his comedy rendition of Elton John's 'I'm Still Standing' has been described as Comedy Gold, and has generated standing ovations.

On 23 September 2009 Event Magazine reported that Orkian won the final of The Next Big Thing - the event industry's version of The X Factor, which was held at Event UK in Birmingham.

On 10 June 2010, Orkian performed for Prince Philip, celebrating his 89th birthday at the Guards Polo Club. The event fell behind schedule and Prince Philip was set to leave – before Kev got on stage – to get to another engagement. But as soon as Orkian started his sketch the Prince decided to sit back down and watch the full act. So impressed was he that instead of rushing off at the end he stayed even longer to congratulate Orkian in person. Prince Philip was quoted as saying "It’s a wonderful show. I thoroughly enjoyed your performance".

Also in June 2010 Orkian performed a live comedy 'sketch' with Katherine Jenkins for a private birthday party at which Lionel Richie also performed, along with the NSO (National Symphony Orchestra) and comedians Bobby Davro and Jethro. The comedy routine was an updated version of an old Victor Borge sketch which Orkian had developed with Jenkins, which both artists performed again on an ITV show called Stepping Out with Katherine Jenkins.

=== Britain's Got Talent ===
In May 2010 Orkian took part in series 4 of ITV's flagship entertainment show Britain's Got Talent, with his first appearance on Saturday 29 May, the last show of the first round auditions. In this appearance, during which Orkian performed his trademark Elton John scratchy CD version of 'I'm Still Standing', he gained three YES votes from judges Simon Cowell, Amanda Holden and Piers Morgan, the latter of whom commented "That is one of the smartest things I've seen", winning himself a place in the live semi-final on Tuesday 1 June.

High-street bookmakers Coral reported one of the biggest gambles in reality TV history on piano playing funny man Orkian to win the talent show stating "With the semi-finals of Britain’s Got Talent set to get underway in just a few hours, Coral are reporting one of the biggest gambles in reality TV history on piano playing funny man Kev Orkian to win the talent show. Orkian has been cut from 100/1 to 9/1 with the firm, and he is now the fourth favourite behind Spellbound, who are 2/1 favourites, Olivia Archbold (7/2) and Liam McNally, at 13/2. Coral spokesman Gary Burton told Bettingpro: "The few pounds we saw first thing this morning at 100/1 and 80/1 quickly turned into three figure bets at shorter prices, he will cost us a fortune if he wins. It's been an incredible punt!"".

Despite missing out on a place in the Britain's Got Talent final (getting buzzed by both Cowell and Morgan in his semi-final performance) and losing the chance to perform at the Royal Variety Show, Orkian nevertheless beat winners Spelbound and the other finalists to the post of performing for royalty. Orkian entertained Prince Philip less than two weeks after being booted off the show and had already performed for several other members of the royal family including Prince Charles, Prince Edward and Princess Michael of Kent. Orkian was invited to perform for Prince Charles at Windsor Castle in 2009 for the British Forces Foundation 10th Gala Dinner. Classical singer Katherine Jenkins and comedian David Walliams also attended. Orkian was granted access to one of the castle's bedrooms to prepare for the comedy piano sketch and he recalls the moment he turned to see Prince Charles turn bright red with laughter during his act: "I was amazed". After the sketch, Prince Charles congratulated him and said he was an "absolute genius".

=== Pantomime ===
Since 1999 Orkian has starred in 27 British Pantomimes alongside a plethora of British stars including Leslie Grantham, Julian Clary, husband and wife team Linda Lusardi and Sam Kane, Warwick Davis, Dame Edna Everage, Stacey Solomon, Sam Bailey, John Inman and Claire Sweeney.

In December 2009 he starred as Chester The Jester in Sleeping Beauty alongside singer/actress Claire Sweeney at The Churchill Theatre, Bromley.

=== Edinburgh Fringe Festival ===
In August 2010 Orkian made his debut appearance at the Edinburgh Fringe Festival, taking his full one-man show, 'Kev Orkian - The Illegal Tour', to the Underbelly on Cowgate.

Trystan Davies, of Fringe Guru awarded the show five stars, stating "Kev Orkian is an acknowledged rising star, and has been rightfully compared to Victor Borge and Dudley Moore." Liz, of LoveFringe.com, also awarded the show a full score of five stars, saying: "This show is one of the few which had us laughing all the way through and received a standing ovation, which is rare for Fringe shows."

The show received similar reviews from the British comedy guide, awarding the show four and a half out of five; and ThreeWeeks magazine, who gave it four out of five stars.

=== Current ===
Kev Orkian booked an arena tour in South Africa in April performing to 6000 people per night, followed by a tour of the Middle East in late April. Orkian headlined the South African Vodacom Funny Festival from 10 June to 7 July; he is the first British comedian to headline 7 times. Kev Orkian was featured in the Dead Air Show podcast.

David Baddiel's stage version of The Infidel has cast Orkian as its star.

In December 2021 and 2022 Orkian compered and performed in the Thursford Christmas show in Norfolk. Thursford Collection

In December 2025, Orkian starred in the critically panned Wicked Wizard of Oz: A Cirque Spectacular at The Brighton Centre.
