= Sigurður Einarsson (economist) =

Icelandic banker (born 1960)

Sigurður Einarsson (born 19 September 1960) is an Icelandic economist, businessman, and one-time chairman of the failed bank Kaupþing, and has been called 'Iceland's most controversial banker'. He was among the so-called Icelandic 'raiding Vikings' (útrásarvíkingar) until the 2008–2011 Icelandic financial crisis, being paid an average of twelve million Icelandic krónur per month in 2007. In a statement which he issued on October 9, 2008, he attributed the collapse to Kaupþing to a 'chain of events which no-one foresaw or could have controlled' ('atburðarás[ar] sem enginn sá fyrir eða gat haft stjórn á').

The UK newspaper The Observer reported that Sigurður, together with other employees of Kaupþing, were suspected of criminal conduct, and in March 2013, he was indicted in Reykjavík 'with orchestrating five large-scale market manipulation conspiracies', in what was the largest prosecution related to the 2008 Icelandic financial crisis so far.

== Life ==
Sigurður is the son of Einar Ágústsson, one-time vice chairman of the Progressive Party, member of the Icelandic parliament and foreign minister, and his wife Þórun Sigurðardóttir. He graduated as an economist from Copenhagen University in 1987 and acquired rights as a licensed broker in the European Economic Area in 1994. He previously worked Den Danske Bank and for the Iðnaðarbanki Íslands, until he moved to Íslandsbanki from 1988 to 1994. He taught at The University of Iceland 1993–97 and sat on the board of the Iceland Stock Exchange during the same period.

Sigurður began working in the securities section of Kaupþings in 1994, because its CEO in 1997 and chairman in 2003–2008. He sits on the boards of Norvestia and Aurora velgerðasjóður.

Described by his one-time junior colleague Ármann Þorvaldsson, Sigurður

would probably do the most to influence the events of the next decade [1997–2007], not only for Kaupthing but for the whole financial market in Iceland ... his prior experience at Islandsbanki and Danske Bank gave him prestige in the company. His fluent Danish also gave us an advantage later, when we expanded into the Nordic countries ... Short and stockily built, squint-eyed, with an ever-receding hairline, Sigurdur resembled nothing so much as a young Winston Churchill. He was tough too, but he kept his friends close ... Far from being a micro manager, he tended to give the younger people a lot of freedom and responsibility. Known to exaggerate numbers, he once famously answered the question ‘how many people live in Iceland?’ with ‘less than a million’ – the population was slightly more than 250,000 at the time. This bullish hyper-confidence set him apart from the rest of us – in the beginning, he was the only one of us who really did have a boundless imagination about what we could do.

== Trial and conviction ==
In December 2013, Einarsson was sentenced to five years imprisonment for his involvement in market manipulation before the collapse of Kaupþing bank, by the Reykjavik district court. On 12 February 2015 Iceland's Supreme Court upheld his conviction, but reduced the sentence to four years in prison.

== Links ==
- Aðalstjórn KB banka
- Æviágrip á vef Aurora Foundation
- Stærstu mistökin voru að fara ekki úr landi úr viðtali við Sigurð 8. nóvember 2008
- Segir Davíð Oddsson hafa hótað því að taka Kaupþing niður úr viðtali við Sigurð 8. nóvember 2008
- Icesave viðvörunarbjöllur byrjuðu að hringja í mars úr viðtali við Sigurð 8. nóvember 2008
- Starfandi stjórnarmenn, grein e. Sigurð sem birtist í Morgunblaðinu 27. September 2004.
- Árangur fyrir Ísland, ræða á viðskiptaþingi Verslunarráðs Íslands 12. febrúar 2003
- Hnattvæðing íslensk atvinnulífs - tækifæri sem ekki kemur aftur!, ræða á aðalfundi Samtaka verslunarinnar, 15. febrúar 2002
- „Atlaga“ felldi íslenska kerfið, 27. janúar 2009
- Bréf Sigurðar Einarssonar til vina og vandamanna, dagsett 26. janúar 2009 í London (pdf)
