= Jongleurs (comedy club) =

British comedy club chain

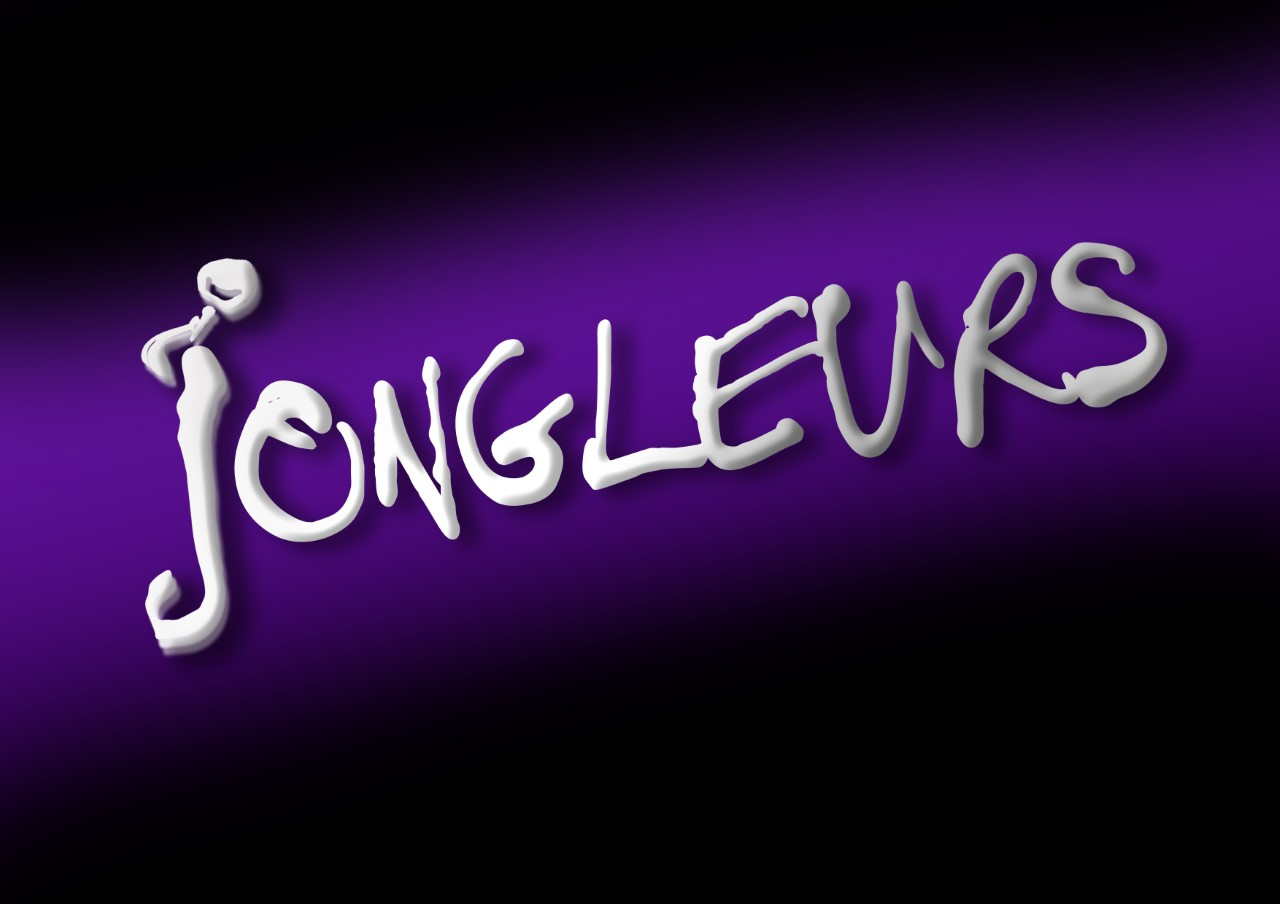
- Industry: Comedy club
- Website: www.jongleurs.com

Jongleurs is a chain of comedy clubs in the United Kingdom, running since 1983. The business is now owned by Kev Orkian.

== Early years ==
Maria Kempinska established and opened the first Jongleurs club in 1983 in Battersea, London. In 1985 Kempinska met her business partner John Davy and they went on to create a number of comedy clubs around the UK in the following years. By 2000, there were eight Jongleurs venues across the UK. Regent Inns plc, the owners of Walkabout, bought the clubs. Kempinska and Davy retained certain rights to the brand name, as well as creative control over booking acts.

With Regent Inns in financial trouble, the Cardiff venue was closed in January 2009 and in October that year, Regent Inns went into prepacked administration, allowing for a management buy-out which resulted in the formation of Intertain UK. As a result of this administration, Jongleurs venues in Southampton, Nottingham, Bristol, Oxford and Bow (London) all closed. The sites in Oxford and Nottingham were later reopened by rival chain The Glee Club. As a result of the management buy out, Intertain UK decided to end its relationship with Jongleurs and all the remaining clubs were rebranded as Highlight in January 2010.

== Rejuvenation and subsequent closures ==
Kempinska and Davy set about building a new chain of Jongleurs clubs. Hammersmith opened a month after the Regent Inns collapse and Bournemouth, Notting Hill and Clacton followed shortly after. Momo Leisure secured a franchise and opened a new club in Nottingham in 2010. In September 2010 they opened a new venue at Novus Leisure club Sway in Covent Garden and three more in Tiger Tiger venues. Nightclub operators Luminar licensed the brand to 12 of their venues around the country in 2011. Later in the year, Luminar was put into administration and although all the clubs hosting Jongleurs nights avoided the first closures, the venues in Swansea, Basildon, Birmingham, Newcastle upon Tyne and Norwich were all closed by February 2012.

== Current ==
Kev Orkian purchased the Jongleurs brand in May 2020 during the pandemic. He also founded entertainment brands Howlin' Comedy Club Ltd, Howlin' Entertainment Ltd & British Pantomime Academy. Orkian has set out to redevelop the Jongleurs brand and bring the quality of what it stood for when it first opened.

== 2021 venues ==
- Concord Club, Southampton
- Queen Theatre, Barnstaple
- Pink Zebra, Waltham Abbey
- Highland Restaurant, Broxbourne
- Beccles Theatre, Smallgate, Suffolk
- Home Grown, Marble Arch
- Stirrup Cup, Kettering
- Parndon Woods, Harlow
- Water Rats Pub, Kings Cross
- Chrysalis, Milton Keynes
