= 102 and 104 Micklegate =

Listed building in York, England

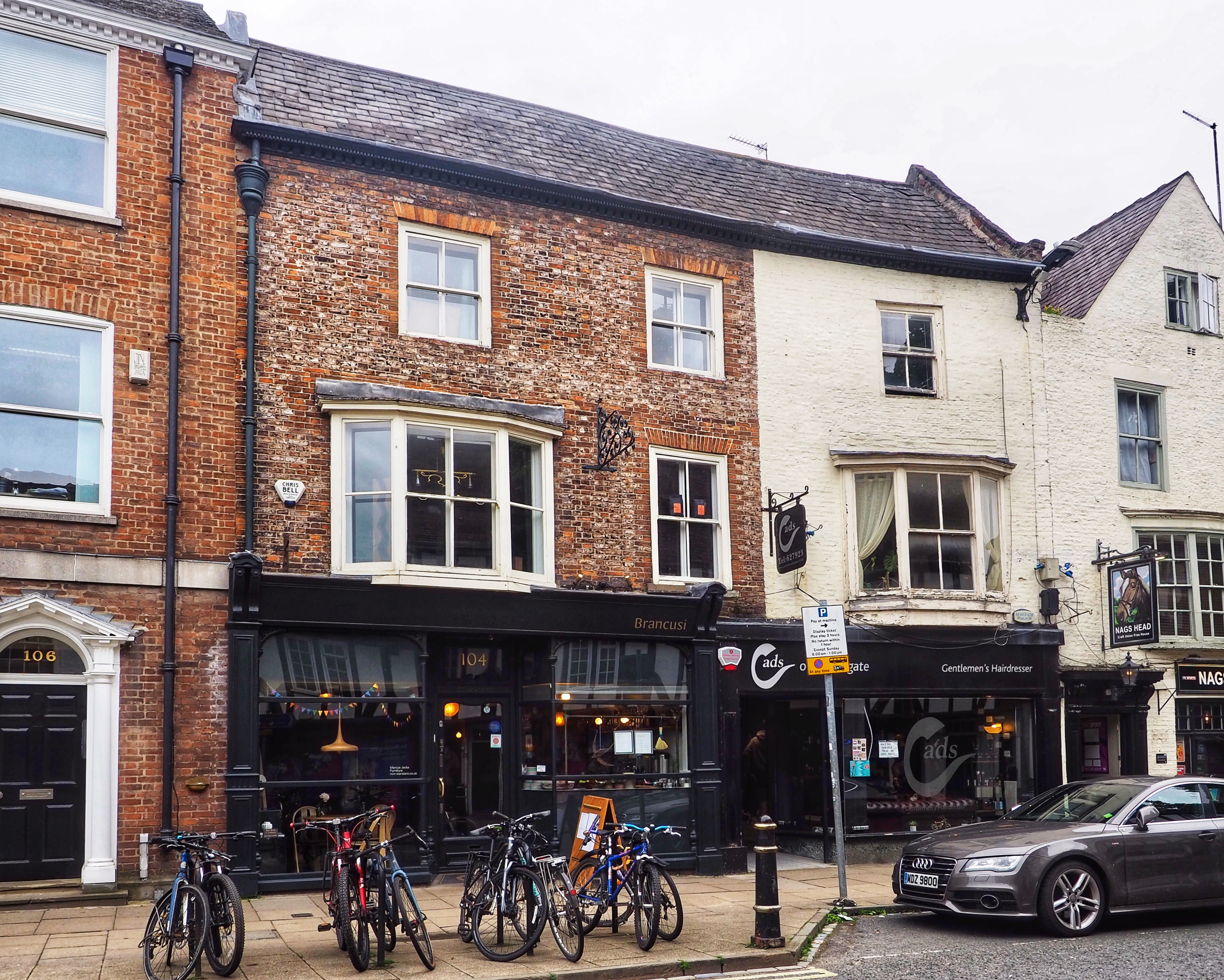
- The building in 2024; No. 104 is on the left
- Interactive map of the 102 and 104 Micklegate area

General information
- Status: Converted to commercial uses
- Type: House (former)
- Location: Micklegate, York, England
- Coordinates: 53.9568°N 1.0897°W
- Year built: Late 17th century
- Renovated: Mid-18th century (refronted); 1812 (subdivided); Late 19th century (altered); 20th century (shopfronts)

Listed Building – Grade II*
- Official name: 102 and 104, Micklegate
- Designated: 19 August 1971
- Reference no.: 1257300

102 and 104 Micklegate is a Grade II* listed building on Micklegate in the city of York, England. Originating as a late‑17th‑century house, it was altered in the early 18th century, divided into two units in 1812, and later given bay windows and modern shopfronts. The site was included in the Central Historic Core conservation area in 1968. It stands next to the Grade II‑listed Nags Head pub, with No. 102 now occupied by a barber and No. 104 used by a restaurant.

== History ==
The building stands on Micklegate and began as a late-17th-century house. Its front was altered in the early 18th century, and the property was divided into two units in 1812. Bay windows were added to the Micklegate frontage around 1850, and further changes followed later in the 19th century, with modern shopfronts introduced in the 20th century. In the mid‑18th century it formed part of a group of houses owned by Isabella Stockdale. In 1817 William Stockdale Powell sold Nos. 102 and 104 to Francis Calvert, a cordwainer who had occupied the premises since the 1812 subdivision. At that time the two parts were rated separately, with Calvert living at No. 102 and letting No. 104 to a succession of tenants until 1834, when he moved into No. 104 and No. 102 became the premises of Calvert & Son.

In 1968 the site was included within the newly established Central Historic Core conservation area, and on 19 August 1971, Nos. 102–104 were designated a Grade II* listed building. It stands next to the Nags Head, a Grade II-listed public house. No. 102 is now occupied by a barber, while No. 104 is used by a restaurant.

== Architecture ==
The front is built of mottled orange brick, with No. 102 painted, and has an eaves cornice. The main range has a slated roof with brick‑coped gables, while the rear wings are tiled.

The frontage has three storeys and three window bays. No. 102 has a modern shopfront. The shopfront to No. 104 has panelled pilaster sides and a plain fascia with moulded detailing, carried on paired brackets with small rounded gablets above. The shop door is partly glazed and partly panelled, with an overlight set above a fluted transom and a decorative centre panel. It is flanked by half‑canted plate‑glass windows of three arched lights, carried on small columns with moulded capitals and bracketed spandrels.

On the first floor there are two canted bay windows of three lights, each with a four‑pane centre sash. The other windows are four‑pane sashes with flat brick arches, and those to No. 102 are painted.

At the rear, a three‑storey central bay is flanked by two gabled wings of two storeys with attics. The central bay has a blocked round‑headed window at first‑floor level. The right‑hand wing has a 12‑pane sash in the gable, set within the blocking of an earlier opening whose arch and hood mould remain. The attic has a three‑light casement in the blocking of another earlier window, beneath a flat arch and a small pedimented hood. Below the tumbled brick coping is a blocked oval opening. A moulded string course runs across the first floor.

=== Interior ===
On the ground floor of No. 104, the original rear room shows an exposed main beam with chamfered stops, and the central bay has two moulded beams. The staircase rises from the ground to the second floor and has an open string with paired column‑and‑vase balusters on each tread and a flowing handrail; some of the balusters on the second‑floor landing are of a twisted pattern.

On the first floor, the landing has eight‑panel doors. The larger front room contains a late‑19th‑century fireplace. An elliptical arch on plain pilaster sides, with moulded detailing at the springing, leads into a small front room fitted with full‑height panelling, a moulded cornice and a six‑panel door. In the original rear room the main beam survives, along with an eight‑panel door and a panelled window surround. The smaller rear room retains a substantial 17th‑century cornice.

On the second floor, a small area of 17th‑century panelling remains on the landing. The larger front room has a plain fireplace with a basket grate, fluted side pieces and a moulded shelf. A three‑panel plank door leads to the back room. Original floorboards survive in several rooms.

The interior of No. 102 was not inspected at the time of its listing, but the RCHME notes an 18th‑century staircase with a closed string, square newels and closely spaced turned balusters with square knops.

== See also ==
- Grade II* listed buildings in the City of York
- Listed buildings in York (within the city walls, southern part)
