= Slug and Lettuce, Islington =

Pub in Islington, London

Coordinates: 51°32′12″N 0°06′11″W

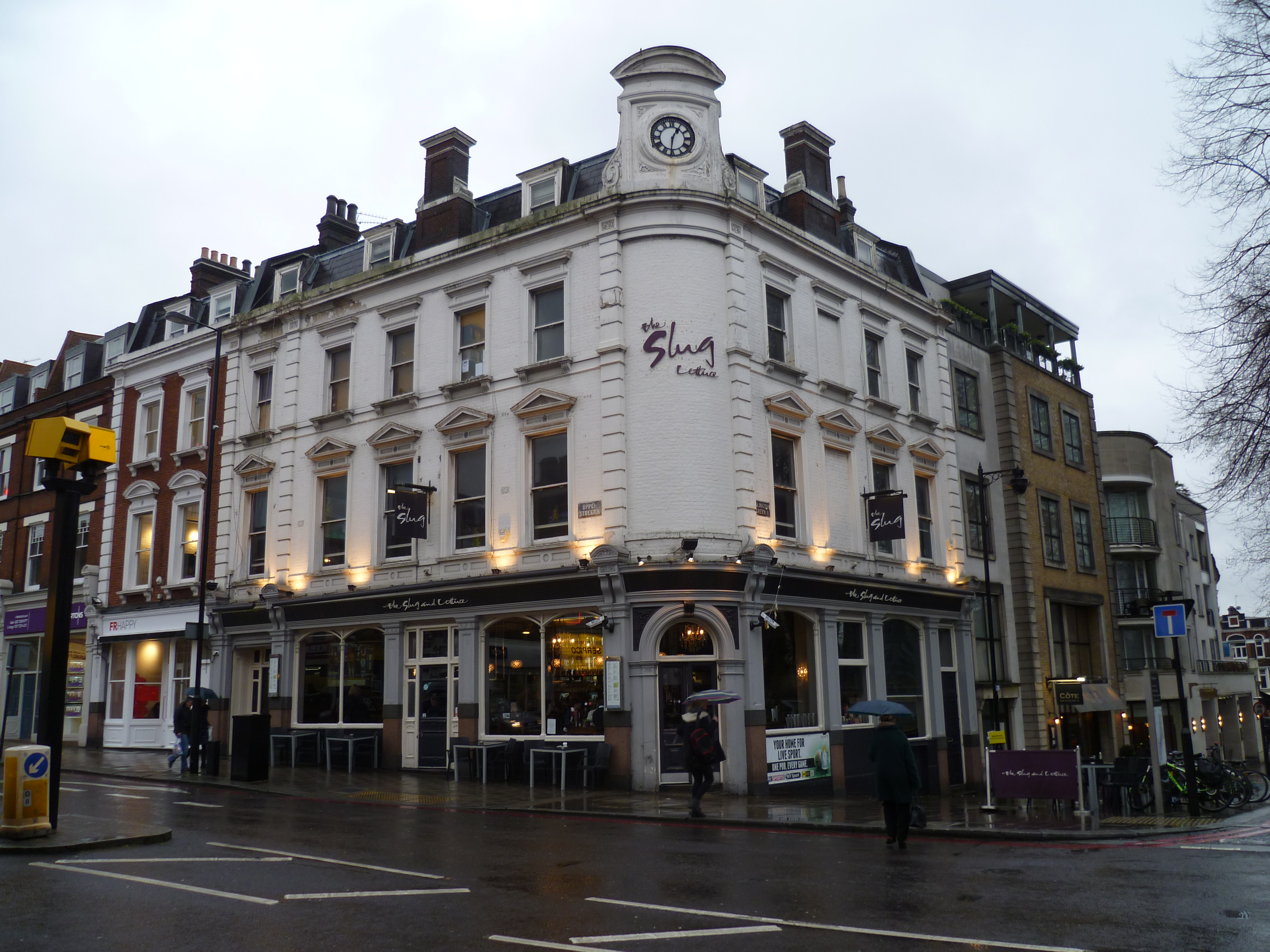
The Slug and Lettuce

The Slug and Lettuce is a Grade II listed public house at 330 Upper Street and Islington Green, Islington, London.

It was founded before 1793 and rebuilt in 1872, trading as "The Fox" until 1984 when it became the first Slug and Lettuce, which would grow into one of the UK's leading pub chains. It was again renamed "Fox on the Green" in 2016. It is operated by Social Pub & Kitchen, a division of Stonegate Pub Company, which also owns Slug and Lettuce.
