= Hreiðar Már Sigurðsson =

Icelandic businessman

Hreiðar Már Sigurðsson (born 19 November 1970) is an Icelandic business manager working in international finance, and from 2003 to 2008, was the CEO of Kaupthing Bank.

He graduated from the University of Iceland in 1994 with a degree in business administration. Later the same year he joined the Asset Management Division of Kaupthing (later to become Kaupthing Bank after uniting with Búnaðarbanki Íslands).

Hreiðar Már was appointed Deputy CEO of Kaupthing in 1998. He served as managing director of Kaupthing New York since it was founded in March 2000 until late 2001. He was appointed CEO of Kaupthing Bank in the beginning of 2003. Kaupthing was nationalized by the Icelandic Financial Supervisory Authority in October 2008.

In 2010, Time magazine named Hreiðar Már as one of their hundred most influential people in the world for his role in the Icelandic crash. Soon after, on 6 May 2010, Hreiðar Már was placed under arrest, by a special prosecutor, on suspicion of falsifying documents, embezzlement, breach of trading laws, and market manipulation. On 8 May 2010, Hreiðar Már was placed in solitary custody for 12 days by a Reykjavik court.

On 12 December 2013, Hreiðar Már was sentenced to five and a half years in prison for his part in a market manipulation case involving Sheikh Mohammed Bin Khalifa Bin Hamad al-Thani's purchase of a 5.1% share in Kaupthing Bank weeks before the bank collapsed in October 2008. This was, at the time, the heaviest sentence for financial fraud in Iceland's history. The verdict was appealed to the Supreme court which upheld the previous verdict on 12 February 2015.
