= Michael Morley (banker) =

British banker (born 1957)

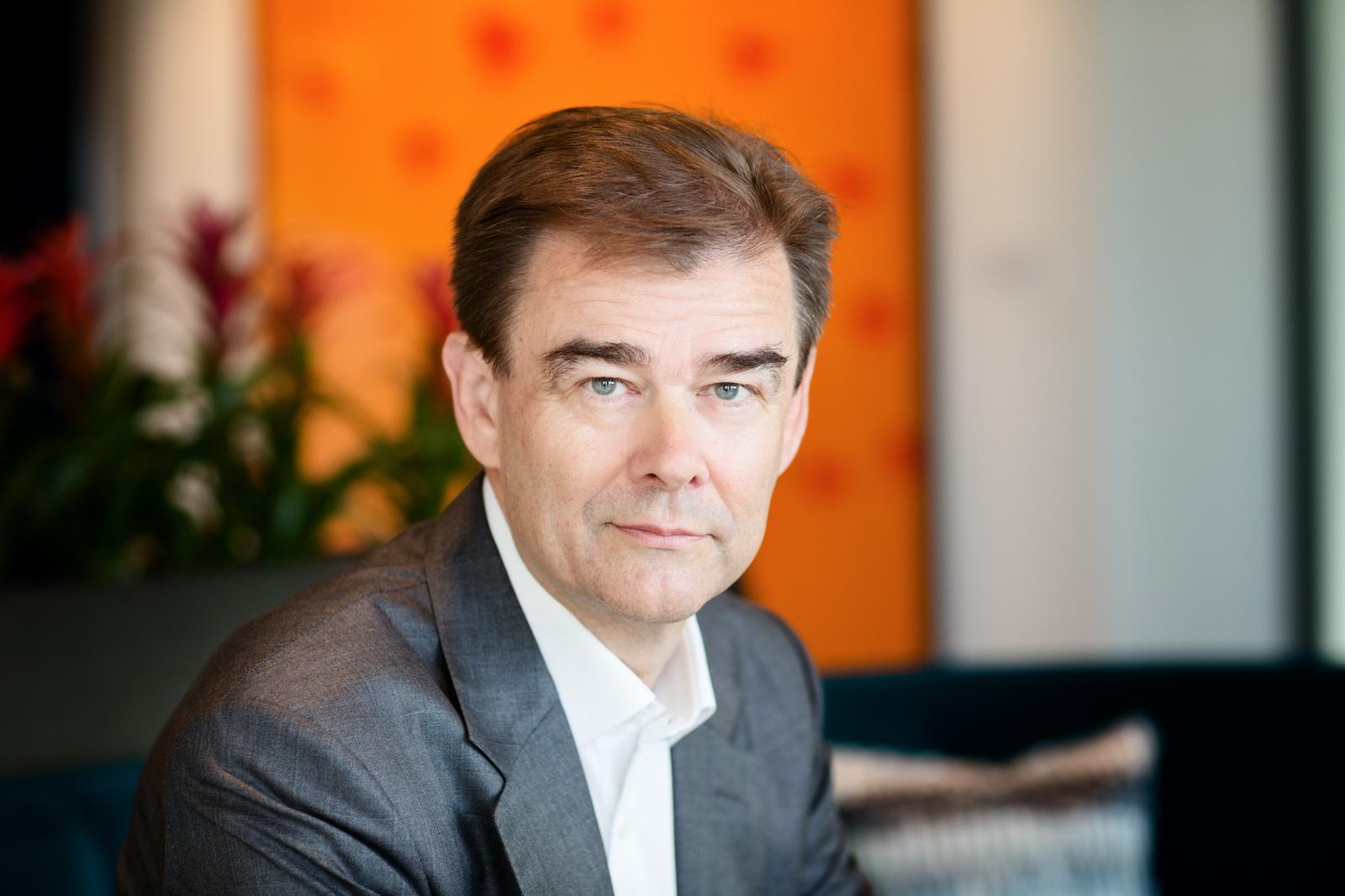
- Michael John Morley
- Born: Michael John Morley; 18 May 1957 (age 69)
- Occupation: Banker
- Years active: 1979–present

Michael John Morley (born 18 May 1957) is a British banker and business executive. He was chief executive officer of Coutts & Co from May 2009 to March 2016. He subsequently led Deutsche Bank's UK wealth management business from 2017 to 2022. Since January 2025 he has been chair of trustees of the Centre for Mental Health.

== Early life and education ==
Morley was educated at Merchant Taylors' School in Northwood, London followed by Cambridge University where he studied Modern and Medieval Languages at Christ's College, Cambridge.

== Career ==
Morley began his career in 1979 at Lloyds Bank International, where he gained experience in international finance including postings in Latin America. He subsequently held a senior position as Managing Director of International Private Banking at Barclays Wealth, and was CEO of Barclays Bank (Suisse) SA in Geneva for five years until 2007. He had spent the previous eight years at Merrill Lynch in London where he was Head of the UK Private Client business and Managing Director of the Ultra High Net Worth business in Europe, Middle East and Africa. He spent a year as MD of Singer and Friedlander Asset Investment Management before being appointed as CEO of Coutts in May 2009.

In 2009 he joined the Board of Adam & Company, a private bank headquartered in Edinburgh, Scotland, and in 2010 he was appointed as Chairman of the Royal Bank of Scotland International business, headquartered in Jersey, a role he held for seven years until January 2017.

During his tenure at Coutts, Morley was a Member of the Board of the British Bankers' Association and Chair of its Private Banking and Wealth Management Advisory Panel, and as a Board Member of the Personal Investment Management & Financial Advice Association (PIMFA). He also was an Honorary Board Member of the Royal Opera House, Covent Garden.

In 2014 he was appointed to the Board of Walpole British Luxury. Sanya Forum in Hainan, China, he was appointed to the China Advisory Council of the Judge Business School, University of Cambridge. In 2015 he was appointed to the Board of the Wealth Management Association, which represents the investment community in the UK.

In July 2017, following the conclusion of his executive roles at Coutts and RBS International, Morley joined Deutsche Bank Wealth Management as head of its UK business and CEO of DB UK Bank Limited. He stepped down from that role in 2022 after nearly five years, concluding 42 years in financial services in an executive capacity. Following his departure from executive duties, he was appointed as a Non-Executive Director of Deutsche Bank S.A.E. in Madrid in July 2022, and a Non-Executive Director of Deutsche Bank (Suisse) SA.

In August 2023, Morley joined the Board of Hargreaves Lansdown PLC as an Independent Non-Executive Director and member of its Remuneration Committee. In October 2024 he was appointed Remuneration Committee Chair. He stepped down from the board in March 2025 upon completion of the firm's £5.4 billion takeover by a private equity consortium including CVC Capital Partners.

In February 2025, Morley was appointed as a Non-Executive Board Member of Monument Bank, a UK-based cloud-native digital challenger bank. He was subsequently appointed as Senior Independent Director and Chair of the RemCo.

He has been Deputy Chairman of the Centre for Mental Health since August 2019, and was appointed Chair of Trustees in January 2025. Since 2016 he has been an Independent Director of Walpole British Luxury.

== Personal life ==
Morley and his wife Conchita met in Geneva in the 1980s when they were both working at Lloyds Bank International. They have two sons.
