= Pitcher & Piano =

English restaurant and pub chain

Pitcher & Piano is a restaurant and pub chain in England.

== History ==
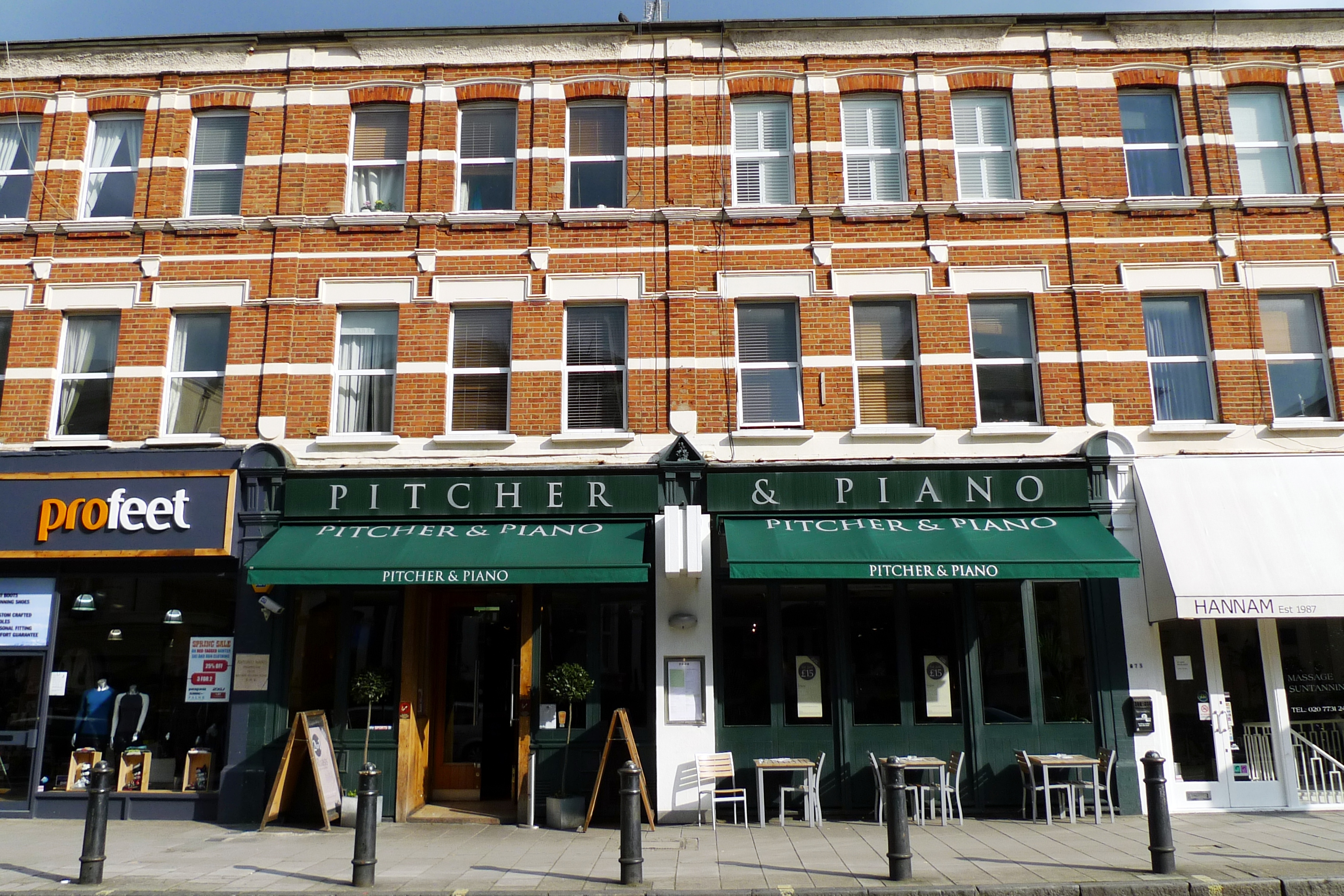
The first Pitcher and Piano in April 2010

The first site opened at 871–873 Fulham Road, London (A304) in September 1986. The company was formed in August 1985.

It was the UK's first female-friendly pub chain. The first establishment was designed by Sheila McKenzie who became managing director until 1989, and later the managing director of Slug and Lettuce from 1994 to 2001. The company opened a management academy in 1991. It was sold in 1996 for £20m when it had 7 bars. By 2006 it had 38.

== Structure ==
The company was founded by Andrew Bonnell (born August 1961). Duncan Watts was commercial director from 1991 until 1998.
