= Tchenguiz =

Tchenguiz is a surname. Notable people with the surname include:

- Vincent Tchenguiz (born 1956), Chairman of Consensus Business Group
- Robert Tchenguiz (born 1960), co-chairman of Rotch Property Group
