= Kaupthing Singer & Friedlander =

Former financial services provider and merchant bank

Kaupthing Singer & Friedlander was a financial services provider offering corporate and investment banking services to small and medium-sized companies, as well as wealth management services for high-net-worth individuals. Primary areas of activity were treasury, investment management, capital markets services, asset finance, and private banking. The company was created in August 2006 by the merger of Singer & Friedlander Plc and Icelandic Kaupthing Bank. The UK government put the company into administration in October 2008 in response to the failure of its parent as a result of the 2008 financial crisis.

== Singer & Friedlander ==
Singer & Friedlander Plc was originally a City of London based merchant bank. It was founded in 1907 by Julius Singer and Ernst Friedlander. George Soros had been employed there as a clerk and later transferred to the arbitrage department of the company in the 1950s. In August 2005, it was acquired by Kaupthing Holdings UK Limited, a subsidiary of Kaupthing Bank, the largest bank in Iceland.

In August 2006, Singer & Friedlander moved its headquarters from the City of London to One Hanover Street, London, W1S 1AX in the Mayfair area in the City of Westminster in London. At the same time, Kaupthing Bank's subsidiary in the UK, Kaupthing Limited, relocated to the same building and the entities merged to form Kaupthing Singer & Friedlander.

== 2008 financial crisis ==
On 8 October 2008, the UK Treasury used the Banking (Special Provisions) Act 2008 to transfer Kaupthing Singer and Friedlander’s Kaupthing Edge deposit business to ING Direct, a wholly owned subsidiary of the ING Group. The remainder of Kaupthing Singer and Friedlander's business was put into administration. There is an ongoing dispute regarding ING's refusal to accept the terms of fixed rate deposits advertised on the Kaupthing Edge website after its acquisition by the company.
