= Vincent Tchenguiz =

Iranian-British entrepreneur

- Born: 9 October 1956 (age 69); Tehran, Pahlavi Iran
- Citizenship: British
- Education: Boston University; McGill University; New York University
- Occupation: Chairman of consensus business group
- Children: 2

Vincent Tchenguiz (born 9 October 1956) is an Iranian-British entrepreneur born in Tehran. Robert Tchenguiz is his younger brother. Tchenguiz is known as a major donor to the Conservative Party (UK) and an investor in the controversial company SCL Group, known for the Facebook–Cambridge Analytica data scandal involving its subsidiary.

== Early life and education ==
Tchenguiz was born in Tehran, Iran, to an Iraqi-Jewish family, the son of Victor and Violet Khadouri. His family left Iraq in 1948 and settled in Iran, where his father, Victor Tchenguiz, a jeweler, worked for the Shah and ran the country's mint, even though he was a foreigner and was Jewish. He also changed the family surname from Khadouri to Tchenguiz. In 1979 the family fled to England after the Iranian revolution.

He has one brother Robert Tchenguiz and a sister Lisa Tchenguiz who divorced BBC Radio 1 disc jockey, Gary Davies, and South African-born Del Monte CEO, Vivian Imerman.

Tchenguiz completed his Iranian education in Tehran in 1973. He subsequently completed a business administration course at Boston University and then went on to earn a Bachelor of Science in Commerce and a Bachelor of Science Honours in Economics from Montreal's McGill University in 1978. A master's degree in business administration from New York University followed two years later.

== Career ==
Upon completion of university, Vincent Tchenguiz took employment in London with Prudential Bache as a senior vice president in their fund management division, where he traded financial instruments. In 1986, he went on to another senior vice-president position, this time trading financial instruments for Shearson Lehman Brothers in London.

Two years later, he and his brother Robert established a commercial property business, Rotch Property Group. Vincent Tchenguiz is the joint managing director and joint chairman. In 2002, Vincent Tchenguiz set up Consensus Business Group, assuming the position of chairman. Consensus functions as the principal advisor to a family trust, advising on an investment portfolio of residential freeholds and commercial properties valued by Lazard in 2012 at approximately 3.0 billion pounds. Consensus also advises on other investments, including health care, clean technology, biotechnology, homeland security and holdings in funds valued at around 200 million pounds.

Tchenguiz along with the Credit Mercantile Group bought an interest in Chestertons from Arqaam Capital and the Saudi Arabian Commercial Investment Corporation in 2007. In December 2008, Mercantile purchased Vincent Tchenquiz's stake, giving them full ownership of Chestertons.

In 2009, Tchenguiz steered the move of Bramdean Alternatives investment trust to move to private equity following the Bernie Madoff scandal. The fund was taken over by Aberdeen Asset Management and rebranded Aberdeen Private Equity and run by Alex Barr.

On 10 March 2011, Vincent Tchenguiz was arrested by the Serious Fraud Office (SFO) as part of a wider investigation into the collapse of Icelandic bank Kaupthing. However, he was released the same day without charge.

Subsequently, on 16 March 2011, the High Court in London ruled that Vincent Tchenguiz could sue Kaupthing for damages of £1 billion ($1.6 billion). In September 2011, Kaupthing reached an out-of-court settlement with the Tchenguiz Family Trust in their pursuit of damages against the Icelandic bank. All details of the settlement remain confidential.

On 5 December 2011, Vincent Tchenguiz and other parties in the case wrote to SFO, outlining details of the allegation against the government department and seeking damages of c.£100 million.

On 22 December 2011, the SFO and the Treasury Solicitors Department (TSoI) admitted factual errors in the information used to obtain the warrants against Consensus Business Group and Vincent Tchenguiz; stated that the warrants should be quashed; and that material seized under the warrants would be returned that day. Furthermore, the SFO offered to pay reasonable legal costs.

Vincent Tchenguiz said, "It beggars belief that the SFO has taken so long to realize the error of their ways and I do not regard their actions … as being of their own initiative – their hand has been forced by our legal actions. Whilst I am glad that they have conceded to pay the significant legal costs incurred – the damage their actions have caused, both financial and to my reputation, are far greater. I intend to pursue them through the civil courts for damages."

In December 2012, the Financial Times reported that the brothers are to seek up to £180m in damages from the SFO.

On 25 July 2014, Vincent Tchenguiz agreed a settlement with the SFO for £3m in damages and £3m in legal costs and receives a full apology from SFO Director David Green who "deeply regrets the errors" made by his agency. In a statement, Vincent Tchenguiz says that "it has become increasingly apparent that the SFO's investigation was influenced by certain third parties acting in their own commercial interest."

Beginning in 2011, Black Cube, a private intelligence firm founded by former Israeli intelligence agents, provided intelligence services to Vincent Tchenguiz in a number of cases, including Tchenguiz’s fight against the UK Serious Fraud Office (SFO), following his arrest as part of the SFO investigation into the collapse of the Icelandic bank Kaupthing. Black Cube analyzed the network of relationships surrounding the collapse of the bank, and helped build a successful challenge to the SFO arrests and search warrants, causing the judge to declare the SFO’s actions unlawful in 2013. Following this investigation the SFO was ordered by the court to pay over £3m in damages and £3m in legal costs to Tchenguiz in 2014, and to issue a formal apology. In 2013, Black Cube filed a lawsuit in the UK against Vincent Tchenguiz for unpaid invoices and breach of contract. Concurrently, Tchenguiz filed a lawsuit in Israel against Black Cube, alleging fraudulent invoices, an allegation denied by Black Cube. Both lawsuits were dropped in a settlement agreement, the details of which are undisclosed.

In January 2018, Proxima GR Properties, owned by the Tchenguiz family trust of which Tchenguiz is a beneficiary refused to replace flammable cladding, similar to the material responsible for the Grenfell Tower fire. The company insisted the leaseholders pay the £2 million cost, up to £31,300 per flat and any costs incurred in the delay of payments including fire wardens and scaffolding.

Tchenguis has invested more than £500,000 in Israeli defense technology company eVigilo which has cooperated with Ericsson to send warning text messages in specific areas. Tchenguiz has also been the largest shareholder of Cambridge Analytica, the company involved in 2018 Facebook scandal.

He was an investor in the controversial company SCL Group, known for the Facebook–Cambridge Analytica data scandal involving its subsidiary Cambridge Analytica.

== Donations ==
Tchenguiz is known as a major donor to the Conservative Party (UK).

== Personal life ==
Tchenguiz resides in Mayfair, London, with additional homes in St Tropez and Cape Town. He maintains a 130-foot Mangusta motor yacht on the French Riviera named Veni Vidi Vici, Latin for "I came, I saw, I conquered." The Guardian's Robert Booth reported on 17 January 2018 that Tchenguiz purchased a new 165-foot motor yacht, the Da Vinci, in 2017. The same article, headlined "Residents of the tower with Grenfell-style cladding told they must foot £2m bill", reported that Tchenguiz had agreed to replace hazardous flammable cladding on his Citiscape complex in Croydon, as soon as its low-income residents pay him £31,300 per flat in advance to cover the cost.

== SFO case timeline ==
9 March 2011 – Vincent and Robert Tchenguiz are arrested by City police and SFO investigators. The brothers both deny any wrongdoing and are released on the same day without charge

18 May 2012 – Secret negotiations are revealed that show that the SFO offered to drop their investigation into Vincent Tchenguiz in return for a £50 million donation to charity after Lord Justice Thomas accuses the SFO of acting with "sheer incompetence"

18 June 2012 – The SFO drops its investigation into Vincent Tchenguiz. In a statement, Vincent Tchenguiz said: "I have consistently explained to the SFO that they had got it completely wrong – but, as their investigation collapsed around their ears, they stubbornly maintained that they regarded me as a suspect."

31 July 2012 – The SFO search warrants for the Tchenguiz brothers are deemed "unlawful" by the High Court and the investigators are further accused of "losing key documents and overlooking financial reports"

15 October 2012 – The SFO drops its investigation into the relationship between Robert Tchenguiz and Kaupthing Bank

3 December 2012 – It is announced that Vincent Tchenguiz is to seek extensive damages against the SFO including allegations of misfeasance in public office.

6 February 2013 – Vincent Tchenguiz files his claim against the SFO including allegations of malicious prosecution and false imprisonment. The claim is for £200 million.

27 March 2013 – SFO is criticized for "unacceptable delays" in their response to the claim made by the Tchenguiz brothers.

26 July 2013 – Grant Thornton, the accountancy firm that provided information to the SFO ahead of Vincent Tchenguiz's arrest, are ordered to disclose the documents shown to the investigators.

28 July 2013 – Grant Thornton are accused of "maliciously misleading" the Serious Fraud office in a series of letters which also accuse them of "criminal wrongdoing"

11 November 2013 – It is revealed in court that the SFO shredded key documents in the Tchenguiz case on the order of accountants Grant Thornton in an attempt to reduce the number of documents it was obliged to disclose.

20 February 2014 – An attempt to block the disclosure of five documents shown to the SFO by Grant Thornton ahead of the arrest of Vincent Tchenguiz is blocked by the Court of Appeal on the grounds that they are "plainly relevant" to the case. Grant Thornton Director, Mark McDonald, and Partner, Steve Akers, we ordered to pay the legal costs of the Tchenguiz brothers.

8 April 2014 – The SFO applies to the UK Treasury for emergency funding as it predicts that it could spend £18.5 million fighting the legal case brought against it by Vincent and Robert Tchenguiz.

25 July 2014 – Vincent Tchenguiz agrees on settlement with the SFO and receives a full apology from SFO Director David Green who "deeply regrets the errors" made by his agency. In a statement, Vincent Tchenguiz says that "it has become increasingly apparent that the SFO's investigation was influenced by certain third parties acting in their own commercial interest."

30 July 2014 – Robert Tchenguiz settles his case with the SFO and accepts a public apology from the Director of the SFO. Vincent Tchenguiz is granted permission to hand evidence disclosed as part of the SFO investigation to criminal and civil legal teams to examine the possibility for further action against third parties.

== See also ==
- List of investors in Bernard L. Madoff Securities
- Robert Tchenguiz
- Black Cube
