= Kaupthing Bank =

International Icelandic bank

Kaupþing banki hf.
- Type: Public
- Industry: Banking
- Founded: 1930; 96 years ago
- Defunct: 9 October 2008; 18 years ago
- Fate: Government custodianship, moratorium on payments
- Successor: Arion banki (Icelandic business only)
- Headquarters: Reykjavík, Iceland
- Key people: Hreiðar Már Sigurðsson (CEO); Sigurður Einarsson (Chairman of the board); Ingólfur Helgason (CEO in Iceland); Ármann Þorvaldsson (CEO in United Kingdom)
- Net income: ▲€812 million (2007)
- Total assets: €58.34 billion (2007)
- Number of employees: 3,330 (2007)
- Website: www.kaupthing.com

Kaupþing Bank (Icelandic: Kaupþing banki, pronounced [ˈkʰœyːpˌθiŋk ˈpauŋcɪ]) was a major international Icelandic bank, headquartered in Reykjavík, Iceland. It was taken over by the Icelandic government during the 2008–2011 Icelandic financial crisis, and the domestic Icelandic-based operations were spun into a new bank, New Kaupthing, which was subsequently renamed Arion Banki. All the non-Icelandic assets and debts remained with the now defunct Kaupthing Bank. Prior to its collapse, it also allegedly loaned money to various parties with the purpose of buying Kaupthing shares.

Prior to its collapse, Kaupthing Bank operated in thirteen countries, including all the Nordic countries, the Netherlands, Belgium, Luxembourg, Switzerland, the United Kingdom and the United States. It was the seventh-largest bank in the Nordic countries in terms of market capitalization.

The bank had employed over 3,300 people with 36 retail branches in Iceland. As of 31 December 2007, the bank had total assets of €58.3 billion. In 2006, it ranked at number 1,006 on the Forbes Global 2000 and number 177 (up by 34 places from 2005) on the list of the world's largest banks composed annually by the international finance magazine The Banker. That year Kaupthing Bank had net earnings of €812 million, compared with €986 million in 2006. About 70% of the operating profit originated outside Iceland (33% in Iceland, 31% in the UK, 26% in Scandinavia, 8% in Luxembourg and 2% in other countries).

On 9 October 2008, following a major banking and financial crisis in Iceland, the Financial Supervisory Authority took control of the bank. The domestic operations of the bank were spun off as a new bank and continue to operate; the rest of the bank, although never technically declared bankrupt, obtained a moratorium on payments from the District Court of Reykjavík and has been suspended from trading in the Iceland Stock Exchange.

== The name ==
Outside Iceland, the bank is known as Kaupthing Bank.

In Iceland, its official name was Kaupþing Banki hf.

Formerly, its official name was Kaupþing Búnaðarbanki hf, but the name was changed as the former name was considered too unwieldy for most people. From 2003 to 2006 the company used the name KB banki for its retail operations in Iceland. In December 2006, however, the bank started using the old name of Kaupþing for its network of high-street banks. It was announced that the change was part of the bank's plan to operate under the same name.

In November 2009, the bank's successor ("New Kaupthing") changed its name to Arion Bank.

The "þ" character is a thorn/þorn.

== History ==
Established in 1982 as a small agency for financial advisory and securities brokerage, Kaupthing became a major player in the changes in the Icelandic financial market, continually setting trends and being one of the five founding partners of the Icelandic Stock Exchange. In the mid-1990s, Kaupthing widened its focus to include opportunities abroad, becoming the first Icelandic financial institution to operate outside Iceland.

Under the leadership of Sigurður Einarsson, Kaupthing was listed on the Icelandic Stock Exchange in October 2000, at which point the original owners of the bank, the savings banks in Iceland, reduced their holdings, and individuals and institutional investors replaced them as shareholders. Kaupthing Bank shares were listed on the Stockholm Stock Exchange in 2002.

By 9 October 2008, Kaupthing Bank HF was forced into government receivership, only days after a crisis at Landsbanki placed that bank into government control. Due to the crisis throughout the Icelandic financial system, all trading in the country's equity markets was suspended on 13 October 2008. The events were followed by the collapse of Iceland's banking sector, which led to the 2008–2011 Icelandic financial crisis.

On 31 July 2009, internal documents from Kaupthing Bank were leaked: WikiLeaks exposed a confidential 210-page document listing Kaupthing's exposure to loans ranging from 45 million to 1.25 billion euros. The leaked presentation revealed that the bank had loaned billions of euros to its major shareholders, including a total of €1.43 billion to Exista and subsidiaries, which own 23% of the bank.

On 9 December 2009, Daniel Thordarsson, former asset manager, and Stefnir Ingi Agnarsson, former stockbroker, both of Kaupthing Hf, were sentenced to eight-month prison terms by the Reykjavik District Court.

The pair was charged with putting in offers to buy Exista shares six times in January and February last year shortly before the close of business so that the offers would affect the end-of-day value of Exista shares. The charges were of submitting false purchase enquiries and of share price manipulation.

== Acquisitions, mergers, subsidiaries ==
- 1930 Búnaðarbanki Íslands (English: Agricultural Bank of Iceland) founded in Iceland
- 1982: Kaupthing hf. founded in Iceland
- 1998 Kaupthing Luxembourg, S.A. opened
- 2000: Kaupthing Faroe Islands opened, Kaupthing New York opened, Kaupthing Stockholm opened
- 2001: Kaupthing Bank Copenhagen opened, Kaupthing Lausanne opened, Sofi acquired in Finland
- 2002 Aragon acquired in Sweden, JP Nordiska acquired in Sweden, Auðlind acquired in Iceland
- 2003 Kaupthing merges with Búnaðarbanki Íslands to form Kaupthing Bank; Tyren acquired in Norway, Norvestia acquired in Finland, Kaupthing Limited opened in the UK
- 2004: A. Sundvall acquired in Norway, FIH acquired in Denmark
- 2005 Singer & Friedlander acquired in the UK
- 2006: Kaupthing Limited merges with Singer & Friedlander to form Kaupthing Singer & Friedlander in the UK
- 2007 Kaupthing buys Dutch merchant bank NIBC for €3 billion; as of late January 2008, Kaupthing decided to cancel the acquisition of NIBC
- 2007 Kaupthing acquired a 20% stake in New Delhi-based Indian investment services company Finoble Advisors with an option to buy the remaining 80% in five years' time
- 2007: Kaupthing buys Belgian private banking and asset management operations of Robeco Bank for an unspecified amount, further strengthening its position in the Benelux market.
- 2007: Kaupthing hf acquired Derbyshire Offshore, the Isle of Man subsidiary of Derbyshire Building Society, continuing Derbyshire Offshore's irrevocable and binding guarantee for all depositors' funds in the new subsidiary, Kaupthing, Singer and Friedlander (Isle of Man) Ltd.
- 2007–2008: Kaupthing launches internet-based Kaupthing Edge in the UK, Belgium, Norway, Germany, Finland, Sweden, Luxembourg, the Isle of Man, Austria and Switzerland.
- 2008: The UK business of Kaupthing Edge, covering £2.5 billion in deposits and 160,000 customers, is taken over by ING Direct after the Financial Services Authority closed its London centre of operations.
- 2009: The Luxembourg business of Kaupthing is acquired by Banque Havilland.

== Kaupthing Edge ==
Kaupthing Edge was a pan-European retail deposit-taking brand. The purpose of the brand was to diversify liabilities on the Kaupthing balance sheet by currency, customer type (personal/retail) and country. Kaupthing Edge offered two deposit products: a savings account and a fixed-term deposit account. Both were straightforward high-interest products. In Belgium customers could choose a third product which was a current account. Kaupthing Edge savings and fixed-term deposit accounts were managed over the Internet with the support of telephone call centers.

Kaupthing Edge was available in ten countries in Europe:

- Finland – available since October 2007; liabilities taken over by the Finnish Financial Supervision Authority on 9 October 2008
- Sweden – available since November 2007; accounts closed and all deposits repaid by 20 October 2008.
- Norway – available since January 2008; liabilities taken over by the Norwegian government on 12 October 2008
- Belgium – available since January 2008, all accounts were frozen on 9 October 2008. The amount above €20,000 came available after a takeover by Keytrade bank on 29 March 2009.
- United Kingdom – available since February 2008; accounts transferred to Dutch bank ING Direct on 8 October 2008
  - Isle of Man – available since April 2008
- Germany – available since March 2008; 30,000 depositors in Germany are still awaiting repayment of their deposits by the bank. Kaupthing Bank Liquidation Committee has announced that it has secured funds to repay German depositors. German depositors started to get their money back on 22 June and are to be paid in full.
- Luxembourg – available since April 2008
- Switzerland – available since June 2008; in liquidation from 17 November 2008. Depositors partially repaid.
- Austria – available since September 2008; accounts frozen on 9 October, accounts transferred to other banks on 29 October

In the EU, compulsory depositor protection schemes safeguarded Kaupthing Edge accounts. The respective countries' financial industries fund these schemes through a levy. In the case of the UK, the government would forward a loan to the scheme against future increased payments in case of a shortfall.

Kaupthing Edge is a word play on 'cutting edge'.

== Ownership ==
Meidur (later renamed to Exista) acquired a 12% stake of Kaupthing Bank in October 2002.

== Government takes control ==
On 8 October 2008, the UK's FSA transferred the UK deposit accounts to ING. In its statement, "The FSA has determined that Kaupthing Singer & Friedlander no longer meets its threshold conditions and is likely to be unable to continue to meet its obligations to depositors ... The FSA concluded that KSF is in default for the purposes of the Financial Services Compensation Scheme".

On 9 October 2008, the Financial Supervisory Authority took control of Kaupthing after the resignation of the entire board of directors. This came about when "Britain transferred control of the business of Kaupthing Edge, its Internet bank, to ING Direct and put Kaupthing's UK operations into administration", placing Kaupthing in technical default according to loan agreements. The prime minister of Iceland, Geir Haarde, has stated that the British government brought down Kaupthing unnecessarily by abusing its power.

On the same day, the EBK (Swiss Federal Banking Commission) began proceedings under the Swiss deposit insurance scheme with respect to the Geneva branch of Kaupthing Bank Luxembourg. EKB requested customers of that branch to contact them so that compensation of up to 30,000 Swiss francs could be paid.

In Finland, the Financial Supervision Authority (Rahoitustarkastus) took control over the Finnish branch to prevent funds from being transferred to Iceland. It has said that it believes that no one will lose their money. Finnish branch paid all its liabilities to its customers with debt it got from three major Finnish banks. The Finnish branch then liquidated all of its assets and paid back debt to the Finnish banks. According to Finnish authorities, Kaupthing Edge ended its operations in Finland on 30 January 2009.

WikiLeaks has made available an internal document from Kaupthing Bank from just prior to the collapse of Iceland's banking sector, which led to the 2008–2009 Icelandic financial crisis. The document shows that suspiciously large sums of money were loaned to various owners of the bank, and large debts were written off. Kaupthing's lawyers have threatened WikiLeaks with legal action, citing banking privacy laws. The leak has caused an uproar in Iceland and may result in criminal charges against the individuals involved.

== Related arrests ==
On 9 March 2011, Robert Tchenguiz and his brother, Vincent Tchenguiz, were arrested in London by the UK's Serious Fraud Office as part of its ongoing investigation in conjunction with Iceland's Special Prosecutor's Office into the collapse of Kaupthing. However, on 22 December 2011, the SFO and the Treasury Solicitors Department (TSoI) admitted factual errors in the information used to obtain the warrants against Consensus Business Group and Vincent Tchenguiz, stated that the warrants should be quashed; and that material seized under the warrants would be returned that day. Furthermore, the SFO offered to pay reasonable legal costs.

March 2013 saw the opening of new prosecutions in Reykjavík against the bank's former chairman and other leading employees for "orchestrating five large-scale market manipulation conspiracies", in what was the largest prosecution related to the 2008 Icelandic financial crisis so far.

On 12 December 2013, four former bosses from the bank were sentenced to between three and five-and-a-half years in jail. They are the former chief executive, the former chairman of the board, one of the majority owners and the former chief executive of the Luxembourg branch. The court sentenced them to five and half years, five years, three years and three and a half years, respectively, in jail. These are the heaviest sentences for financial fraud in Iceland's history. The verdict was appealed.

On 12 February 2015, the Supreme Court upheld the 2013 verdicts. In addition, the sentences for majority owner Ólafur Ólafsson and Magnús Guðmundsson, former chief executive of the Luxembourg branch, were lengthened to 4.5 years in prison.

== See also ==
- Glitnir
- Icesave dispute
- Landsbanki
- Central Bank of Iceland
