= Walkabout (pub chain) =

Chain of Australian-themed nightclubs

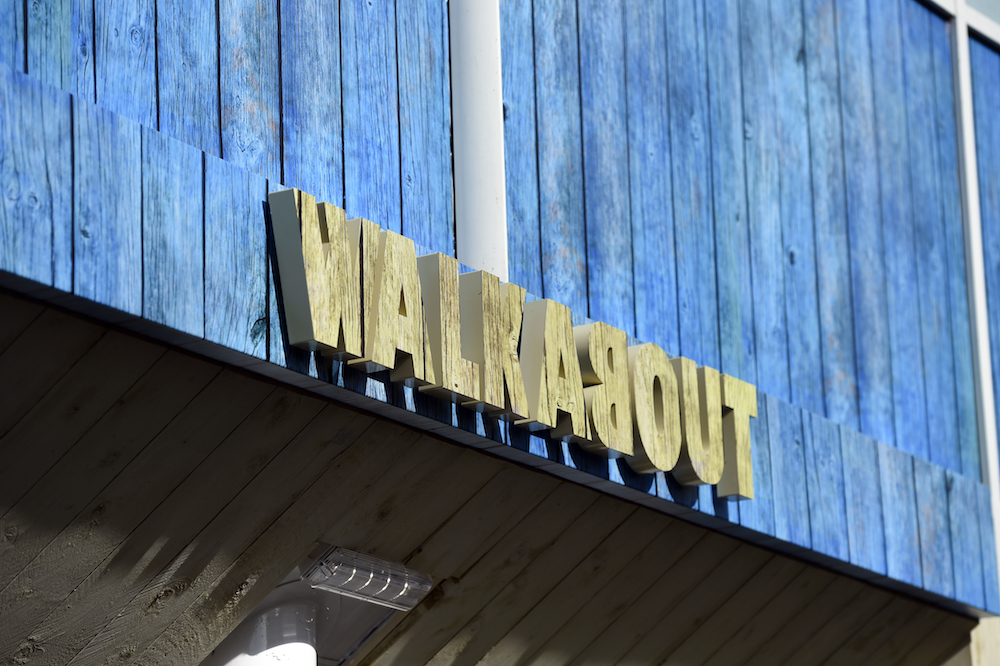
Walkabout sign

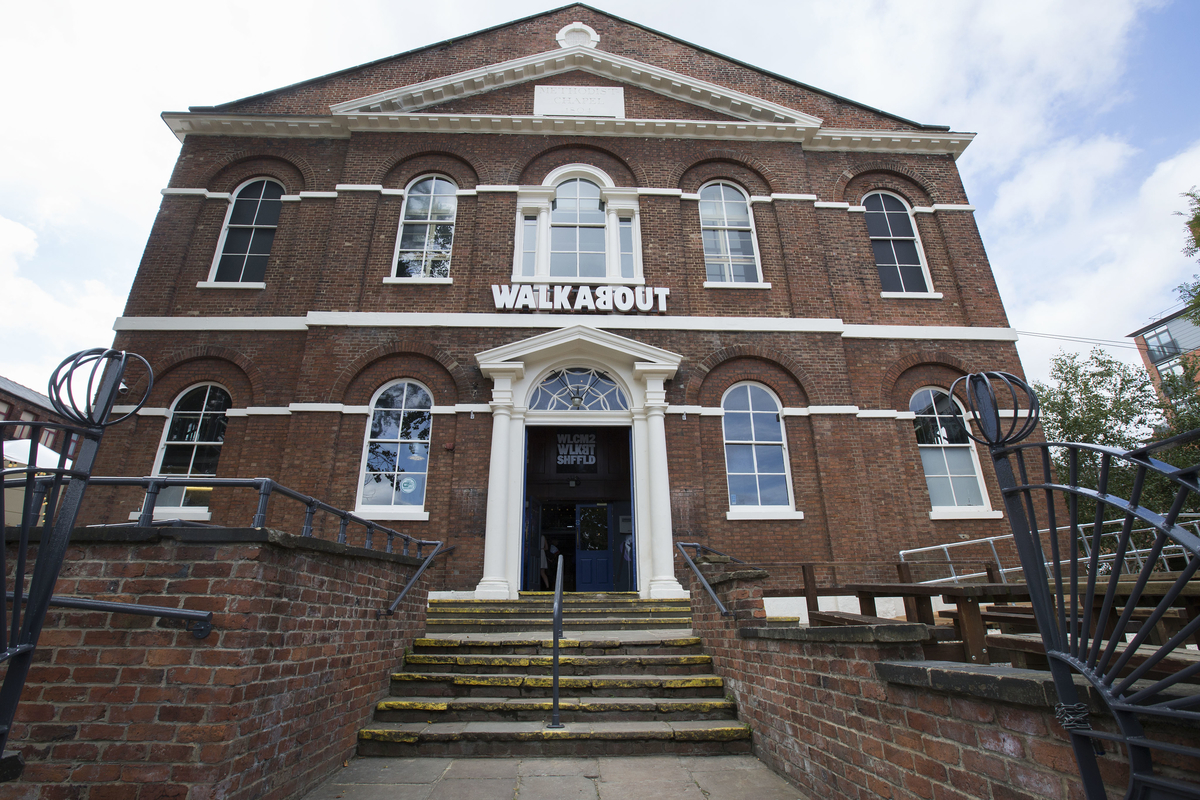
Walkabout Sheffield

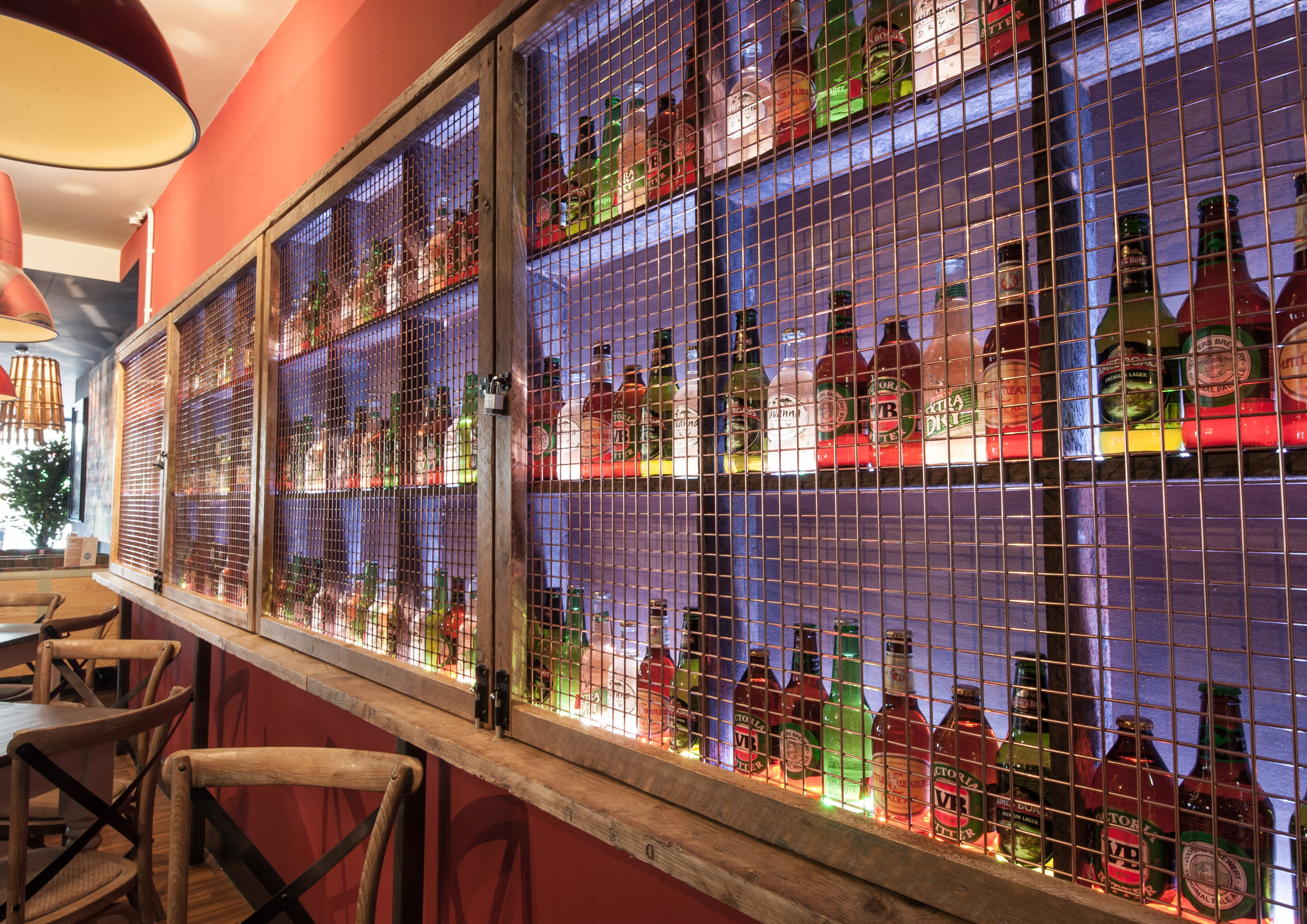
Walkabout's vast Australian drink range

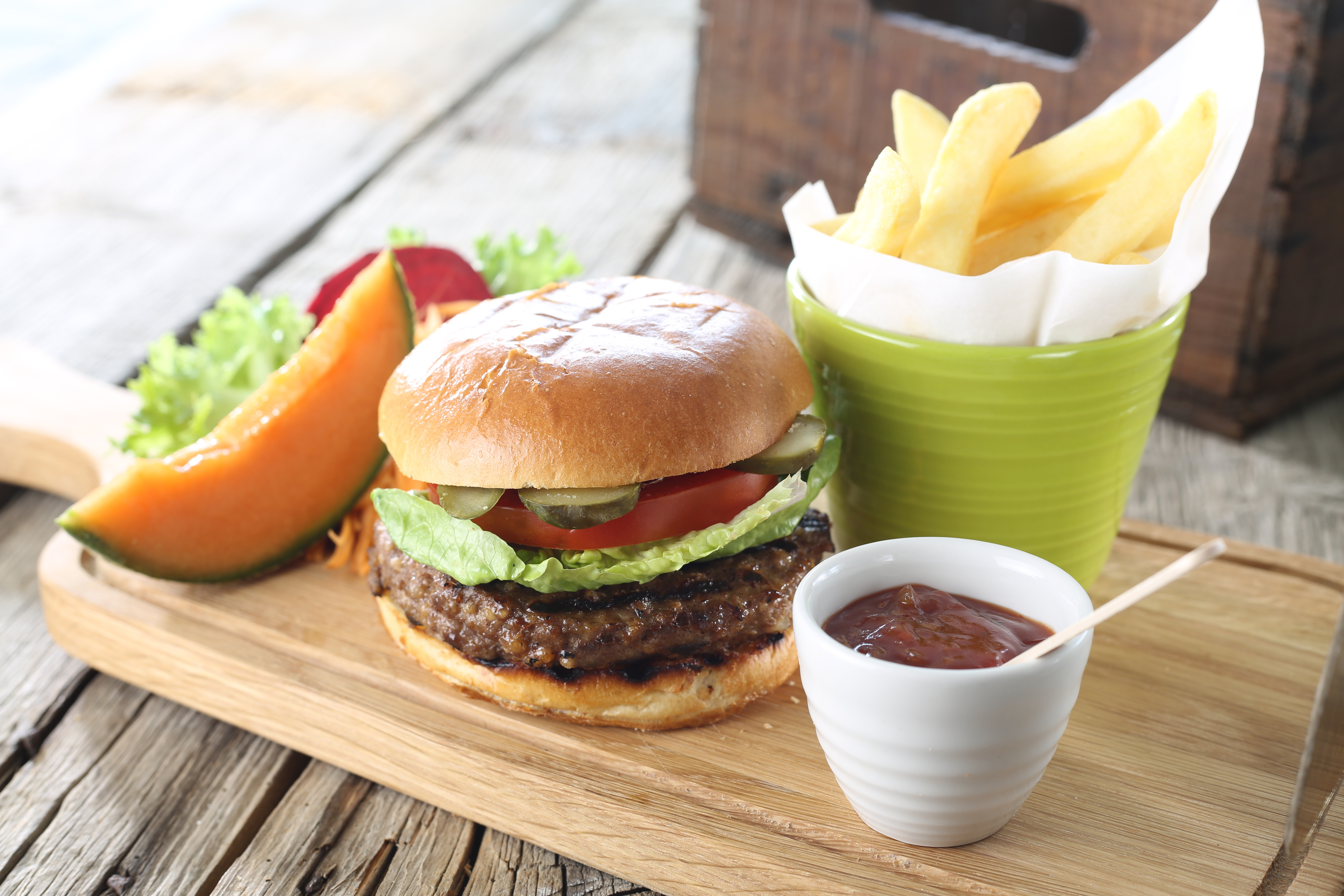
Walkabout's kangaroo burger

Walkabout is an Australian themed pub and restaurant chain in the United Kingdom, owned by Stonegate Pubs since December 2016.

== History ==
The first Walkabout bar was opened in 1994. In December 2016, it was reported that the brand had 30 outlets, down from a peak of about 50.

In 2009, Walkabout's parent company went into administration. A number of unprofitable sites were closed and the company refinanced itself.

In the 2010s, Walkabout came under pressure by boroughs keen to clean up and gentrify their high streets. Its Covent Garden branch, which was the first to open in the mid '90s, was closed in March 2013 with the company saying the site was too small. There were 30 Walkabouts left operating at this time. Shepherd's Bush Walkabout, one of their best known branches, closed in October 2013, leaving only one branch of Walkabout in London. This closed in 2017.

Commencing in 2013, Walkabout embarked on a refurbishment programme across the estate, with the following sites being refurbished: Derby, Carlisle, Lincoln and Blackpool. Following a hiatus in the refurbishment programme works began in earnest in 2015 starting in March with Walkabout Bristol, followed by Sheffield and Newquay. Also the first new Walkabout for 6 years opened in Brighton (in the former Walkabout site); other new venues popped up in Solihull and Lichfield (following the purchase of two former Apres sites). 2015 finished with the opening of a new Walkabout in Manchester's Printworks just before Christmas.

2016 began with the refurbishment of the Walkabout Birmingham on Broad St. Throughout the year, many other existing venues were refurbished, now functioning as new concept Walkabouts. They also have continued to acquire a variety of new sites across the UK and close others.

The most recent opening was in Chelmsford, where the site transitioned from a Wetherspoons to a new Walkabout bar in under three weeks. In contrast, Walkabout's Liverpool venue closed on New Year's Day 2018 after 20 years.

Walkabout has also evolved through innovation, from collaborations with Pieminister and Kilner, to developments in their food offering and stadium seating being added to the Reading venue for watching sports.

In September 2026, Walkabout Bristol closed.

== See also ==
- Australian pub
- List of pubs in Australia
