= Stonegate Pub Company =

British pub company

Stonegate Pub Company Ltd.
- Company type: Private
- Industry: Hospitality
- Headquarters: Registered office: George Town, Cayman Islands; Corporate headquarters: Solihull, England, UK
- Key people: David McDowall (CEO); Dave Ross (CFO)
- Brands: Scream; Slug & Lettuce; Tattershall Castle; Henry's Café Bar; Yates's; Missoula; Social Squirrel; Flares & Reflex; Popworld; Rosies; The Living Room; Retro; Sports Bar & Grill; Walkabout; Be At One; Fever Bars; Tank & Paddle; The Liquorist; Whittle Taps; Craft Union Pub Company
- Owner: TDR Capital
- Website: stonegategroup.co.uk

Stonegate Pub Company Ltd is the largest pub company in the UK, operating around 4,800 managed, leased and tenanted pubs. It is owned by TDR Capital. The head office is based in Solihull, England, and the company is registered in George Town, Cayman Islands.

== History ==
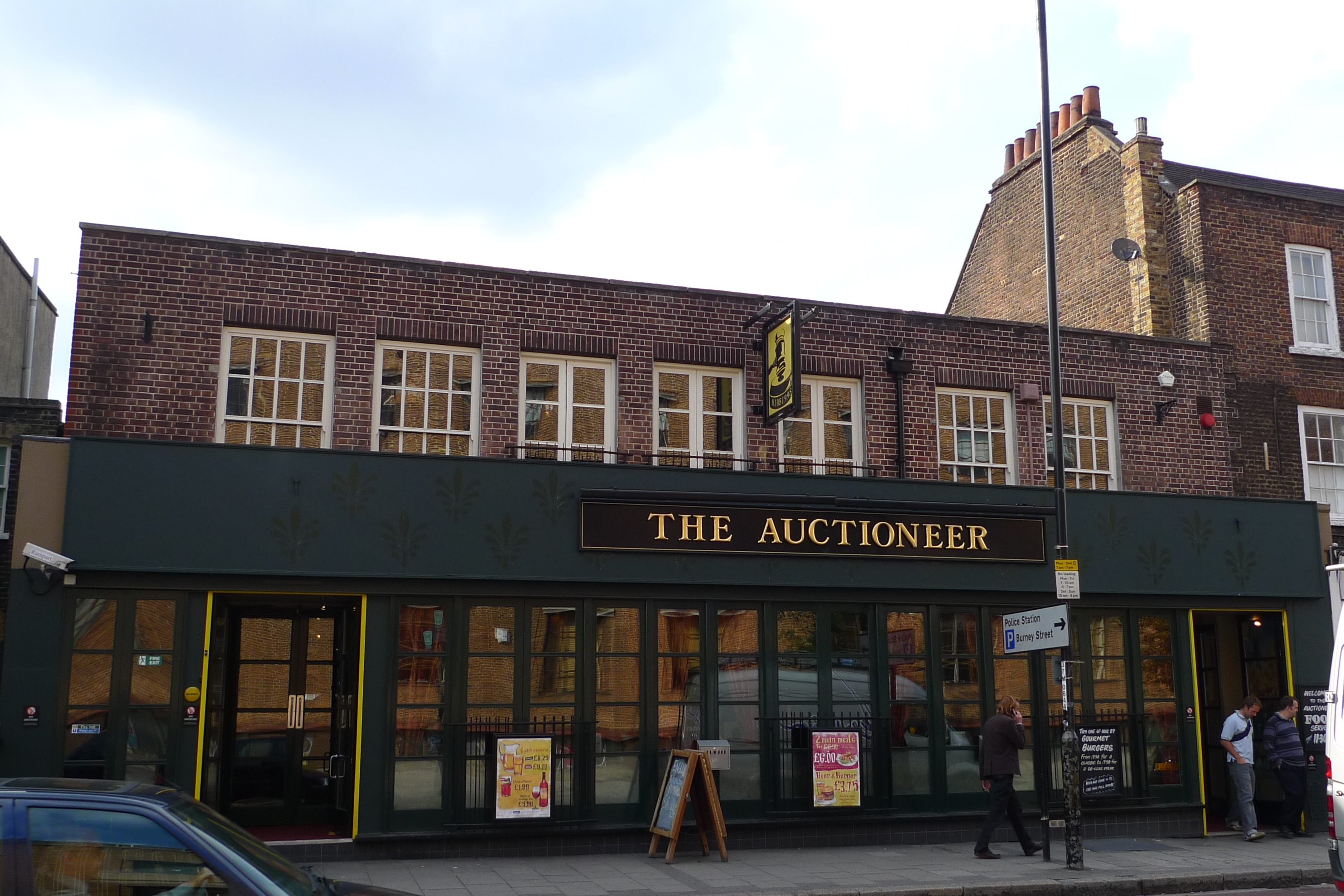
The Auctioneer (now The Lost Hour), an unbranded Stonegate pub in Greenwich, London.

The company was formed in 2010 by the private equity firm TDR Capital, after it purchased 333 pubs from Mitchells & Butlers. Originally trading from rented offices near Birmingham Airport, it then moved its operations office to Capability Green in Luton in June 2011, when Stonegate bought the Town & City Pub Company, which was in receivership, creating the largest privately held managed pub operator in the UK and acquiring the Yates's and Slug and Lettuce brands in the process.

In August 2013, Stonegate acquired thirteen Living Room sites from Premium Bars & Restaurants. In June 2015, a further fifteen sites were acquired from the Scottish pub, bar and hotel operator Maclay Inns, and later that same year Stonegate acquired 53 pubs from Tattershall Castle Group (TCG), including the Henry's Café Bar and Tattershall Castle brands.

In January 2016, the company began updating former TCG estate pubs and rebranding many of the venues to Slug & Lettuce. Later that year, Stonegate exchanged on a package of ten JD Wetherspoon pubs and acquired the Walkabout owner Intertain, adding a further thirty sites to its portfolio.

In 2017, the company acquired the Sports Bar & Grill concept and, in 2018, Be At One and fifteen Novus Leisure sites.

In January 2019, Stonegate acquired Bar Fever Ltd (Fever Bars) – 32 venues: 29 bars, including Fever Boutique, Zinc and Moo Moo, as well as three Bierkeller Bavarian pubs and a further six sites from Novus Leisure.

Following the acquisition of Ei Group, on 3 March 2020, for £1.27 billion, Stonegate Pub Company became the largest pub company in the UK, with around 5,000 sites. It has 1,270 sites within the managed division and 3,457 leased and tenanted businesses.

In 2023 Stonegate was found guilty of a breach of health and safety law that led to the death of Olivia Burt in Durham. As a consequence the company was fined £1.56 million.

In September 2023, the company announced it was to introduce dynamic pricing, increasing the price of alcoholic drinks at busy times.

== Employment issues ==
During the COVID-19 pandemic, Stonegate furloughed 16,500 workers under a UK job-retention programme. This drew negative attention due to the company's Cayman Islands registration. A Stonegate spokesperson said: "Last year Stonegate paid over £300m in tax in the UK. As a UK business, fully paying UK tax, we have every right to access government assistance."

In July 2023, the company was convicted of an offence under health and safety legislation after a February 2018 event in which Olivia Burt, a 20-year-old student at Durham University, was killed when a crowd-control screen fell on her as she was queuing to get into the company's Missoula nightclub in Durham. The victim's parents commented: "Our heartbreak and pain have been prolonged by Stonegate pleading not guilty and fighting the case to trial. We have been waiting 1,976 days for Stonegate to be held criminally responsible. We thank the jury for seeing through Stonegate’s smoke and mirrors defence blaming everyone but themselves for what happened to Olivia." A fine of £1.56 million was imposed for the offence.

In February 2024, Stonegate Group was named by the Department of Business and Trade as one of the companies that had failed to pay the minimum wage, underpaying 3,650 workers.

== Brands ==
Stonegate's managed pubs division is split into branded and traditional (unbranded) pubs. Branded pubs are Slug & Lettuce, Walkabout, Be At One, and venues (including Popworld and Fever).

== See also ==
- List of public house topics
