= InDefence =

Icelandic grassroots citizen movement

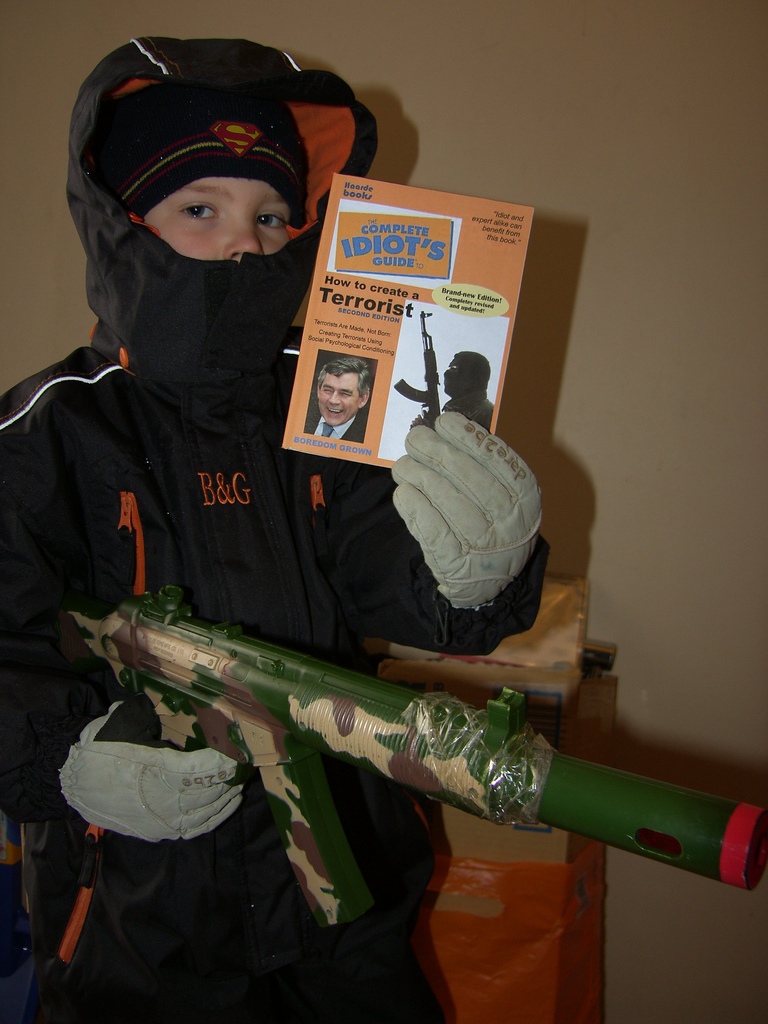
A satirical photograph supposedly showing an "Icelandic terrorist". During the Icesave dispute, the United Kingdom was accused of using anti-terrorism legislation to freeze the assets of Icelandic bank Landsbanki. Thousands of photographs similar to this one were prepared for the protest site indefence.is.

InDefence, also known as In Defence of Iceland, was a grassroots citizen movement formed in October 2008, in the first instance in protest at the Landsbanki Freezing Order 2008, passed at 10 am on 8 October 2008, during the 2008–2011 Icelandic financial crisis.

== Key actions ==
InDefence arranged a petition in protest at the Freezing Order, which became the largest petition in Icelandic history. In March 2009, 83,300 signatures (corresponding to quarter of the Icelandic population) were submitted to the UK Parliament. The petition was accompanied by a website featuring photographs of thousands of Icelanders under the heading: 'I am not a terrorist'.

The movement was also influential in provoking the Icelandic loan guarantees referendum, 2010.

== Background ==
Under the Landsbanki Freezing Order, the UK Treasury froze the assets of Landsbanki within the UK, and introduced provisions to prevent the sale or movement of Landsbanki assets within the UK, even if held by the Central Bank of Iceland or the Government of Iceland. The freezing order took advantage of provisions in sections 4 and 14 and Schedule 3 of the Anti-terrorism, Crime and Security Act 2001, and was made "because the Treasury believed that action to the detriment of the UK's economy (or part of it) had been or was likely to be taken by certain persons who are the government of or resident of a country or territory outside the UK".

== Criticism ==
Both scholarship and literature has discussed how the "we are not terrorists" campaign was not a declaration of Icelandic solidarity with the many people around the world oppressed by the so-called "war on terror" of the first decade of the twenty-first century, but implicitly rather a bid to situate Icelanders and Britons as people who ought to be standing in solidarity against the spectre of the Islamist terrorist. Corresponding, Eiríkur Örn Norðdahl's novel Illska comments that:

um allt land, uppí á jöklum og úti á sjó, stillti fólk sér upp með letruð spjöld og lét taka myndir: "Mr. Brown, We Are Not Terrorists." Því einsog allir vita eru terroristar brúnir karlar með sítt skegg og vefjarhatta og því auðséð á ljósmynd hver er hryðjuverkamaður og hver ekki.

[Throughout the whole land, up on the glaciers and out on the sea, people arrayed themselves with slogans on placards and had pictures taken: "Mr. Brown, We Are Not Terrorists." Because as everyone knows, terrorists are brown men with long beards and turbans, and so it is obvious in a picture who is a terrorist and who isn't.]

Likewise, Kristín Svava Tómasdóttir satirised the movement in her poem a “letter to Mister Brown”:

stundum eru augun í mér svo blá
að þau skelfa mig í speglinum
lít ég út fyrir að vera hryðjuverkamaður?

Translation:

sometimes my eyes are so blue
that they startle me in the mirror
do I look like I’m a terrorist?

The role of InDefence in the political ascendancy of Sigmundur Davíð Gunnlaugsson has been linked to the post-Crash turn of the Icelandic Progressive Party towards populism.

== Notable members ==
Notable members included the academic and novelist Eiríkur Bergmann and Sigmundur Davíð Gunnlaugsson. Sigmundur Davíð's rise to political importance was significantly boosted by the InDefence campaign, and he later became Iceland's prime minister.
