= 2011 Icelandic Icesave referendum =

- 9 April 2011
- Act No. 13/2011 authorizes the Minister of Finance to ratify the agreements signed in London on 8 December 2010, regarding the responsibility for the reimbursement of the Depositors' and Investors' Guarantee Fund to the British and Dutch governments for the payment costs of minimum insurance to depositors in branches of Landsbanki Íslands hf. in Great Britain and the Netherlands and for the payment of balances and interests on those obligations. The law was approved by the Althingi on 16 February 2011, but the President of Iceland refused to ratify it. Should Law No. 13/2011 remain in force?

Results
Choice	Votes	%
Yes	69,462	40.23%
No	103,207	59.77%
Valid votes	172,669	98.60%
Invalid or blank votes	2,445	1.40%
Total votes	175,114	100.00%
Registered voters/turnout	232,460	75.33%
- Results by electoral district

A referendum on the repayment of loan guarantees by Iceland to the governments of the United Kingdom and the Netherlands over the failure of the Icesave bank was held in Iceland on 9 April 2011. This was the second referendum on the issue after a previous one was held in March 2010. After the referendum failed to pass, the British and Dutch governments said that they would take the case to the European courts.

== Background ==
The referendum was held under article 26 of the Constitution of Iceland after President Ólafur Ragnar Grímsson refused to counter-sign the corresponding Act of Parliament (known as the third Icesave bill) into law on 20 February 2011.

Previously, the Althingi had approved Act No. 1/2010 (also known as Icesave bill 2), as amendment to Act No. 96/2009 (also known as Icesave bill 1), authorising the Minister of Finance, on behalf of the State Treasury, to issue a state guarantee to cover deposit insurance over the failure of Icesave. However, the president did not approve this second version of the bill, and instead asked for it to be taken to a referendum. When this previous referendum was held in Iceland on 6 March 2010 asking for the electorates approval of Icesave bill 2, which had been mutually negotiated between the states of Iceland, United Kingdom and the Netherlands, it was defeated with 98% voting against and less than 2% in favour of agreeing to the terms. When the later renegotiated and improved Icesave bill 3 had been approved by the Icelandic parliament, the Icelandic president on 20 February 2011 once again refused to sign the new deal, calling for the matter instead to be decided by a new referendum.

=== Icesave bill 3 ===
The background for the Icesave bills, was that the privately owned Icelandic bank Landsbanki was declared bankrupt on 7 October 2008. One day earlier the Icelandic state had passed an emergency law to guarantee for a full coverage of all lost deposit amounts for domestic Icelandic customers in any bankrupt Icelandic bank, while insisting however not to guarantee anything towards the foreign customers. This caused a split of Landsbanki into two parts, a domestic version (Nýi Landsbanki) – owned and fully guaranteed for by the Icelandic state – to be continued only with domestic customers and assets, and a foreign version (previously named Icesave) being placed in a receivership for liquidation. According to the Icelandic law about minimum deposit guarantees, the Icelandic Depositors' and Investors' Guarantee Fund (Tryggingarsjóður) was required to repay lost deposit amounts to customers in bankrupt financial institutions up till €20,887 per account holder.

As the bankruptcy of Landsbanki was one of 3 big systemically important financial institutions going bankrupt within a few days in Iceland, the Tryggingarsjóður however had already been drained from capital reserves, and had no money left to repay the legally required €4.0bn of minimum deposit guarantees to the 343,306 foreign retail customers from United Kingdom and Netherlands, who had lost all their €6.7bn of deposits in the Icesave branch of Landsbanki. Because nothing was expected immediately to be repaid by any Icelandic institutions/authorities, both the Dutch and British state decided to step in and cover all these account losses in full; while however at the same time demanding the Icelandic state should sign a loan guarantee agreement concerning repayment of the €4.0bn of Icelandic minimum deposit guarantees plus accrued interests. Subsequently, the terms for these loan guarantee agreements were negotiated between the states in the so-called Icesave bills, where Iceland to meet its obligations was offered a £2.35bn (€2.7bn) loan by UK and a €1.3bn loan by the Netherlands. Repayment of the €4.0bn of minimum deposit guarantees, was supposed to happen partly/entirely through the liquidation of remaining positive assets by the Landsbanki receivership in 2009–2015, with the Icelandic state only to overtake/guarantee for the potential remaining repayments in 2016.

After the electorates rejection of Icesave bill 2 in March 2010, some renewed negotiations immediately started about the adjustment of the terms for the loan guarantee repayment agreements, which was considered to be the root cause why the Icelandic people had rejected it. The negotiations resulted in December 2010 in a new adjusted version of the repayment agreement named Icesave bill 3, with better terms for Iceland. The improved terms included the removal of a previous creditor priority issue, and the introduction of a lower 3.2% interest rate in combination with interest moratorium for the first year until 1 October 2009; and if needed when the Icelandic state overtake repayment liabilities from the receivership in 2016, then also a possible extension of the "repayment window" up till 30 years.

Icelandic voters were asked to vote yes/no for Icesave bill 3. Ahead of the vote, the Landsbanki receivership (LBI) published a quarterly financial status, that estimated its total recovery of assets would equal roughly 96% (ISK 1263bn/1319bn) of all priority claims towards the receivership, which implied a full repayment of all minimum deposit guarantees already by the end of 2013, due to their first priority status within the "priority claims". Assuming this estimate was correct, then the Icelandic state with Icesave bill 3 would only be liable in 2016 to conduct repayments to the British and Dutch states, for the accrued 3.2% interests related to the delayed repayment of minimum deposit guarantees in 2009–13. The Icelandic government also noted in the bill, that given these new more favorable terms, the expected total liabilities for the Icelandic state would only amount to ISK 47bn (€0.24bn) in 2016.

== Opinion polls ==
According to an early opinion poll carried out in Iceland on 20 and 21 February 60.7% supported the president's decision to refer the law to referendum, while 57.7% said that they would vote to confirm the legislation. Later polls, however, showed that 52–57% of the population said they would reject the Icesave legislation.

== Results ==
Eligibility was open to all those who could vote in general elections. The total electorate was given as 232,460.

Choice	Votes	%
For	69,462	40.23
Against	103,207	59.77
Total	172,669	100.00
Valid votes	172,669	98.60
Invalid votes	406	0.23
Blank votes	2,039	1.16
Total votes	175,114	100.00
Registered voters/turnout	232,460	75.33
Source: Statistics Iceland

== Reactions ==
After preliminary results suggested that the referendum would be rejected, both Icelandic and British governments officials expressed their disappointment at the preliminary result. In Iceland, Prime Minister Jóhanna Sigurðardóttir stated that "the worst option had been chosen"; Finance Minister Steingrímur J. Sigfússon ruled out a third referendum, saying that "I think we're getting a very clear sign from this referendum, that further negotiations are ruled out. No use in trying that again." UK Chief Secretary to the Treasury Danny Alexander described the decision as "obviously disappointing [and that] we tried to get a negotiated settlement. We have an obligation to get that money back and we will continue to pursue that until we do... We have a difficult financial position as a country and this money would help." He also said that the matter would be referred to the European Free Trade Association Surveillance Authority. The Dutch Minister of Finance Jan Kees de Jager also said the issue would be taken to the court.

== See also ==
- Icesave dispute
- Glitnir (bank)
- Kaupthing Bank
