= Bank failure =

Insolvency or illiquidity of a bank

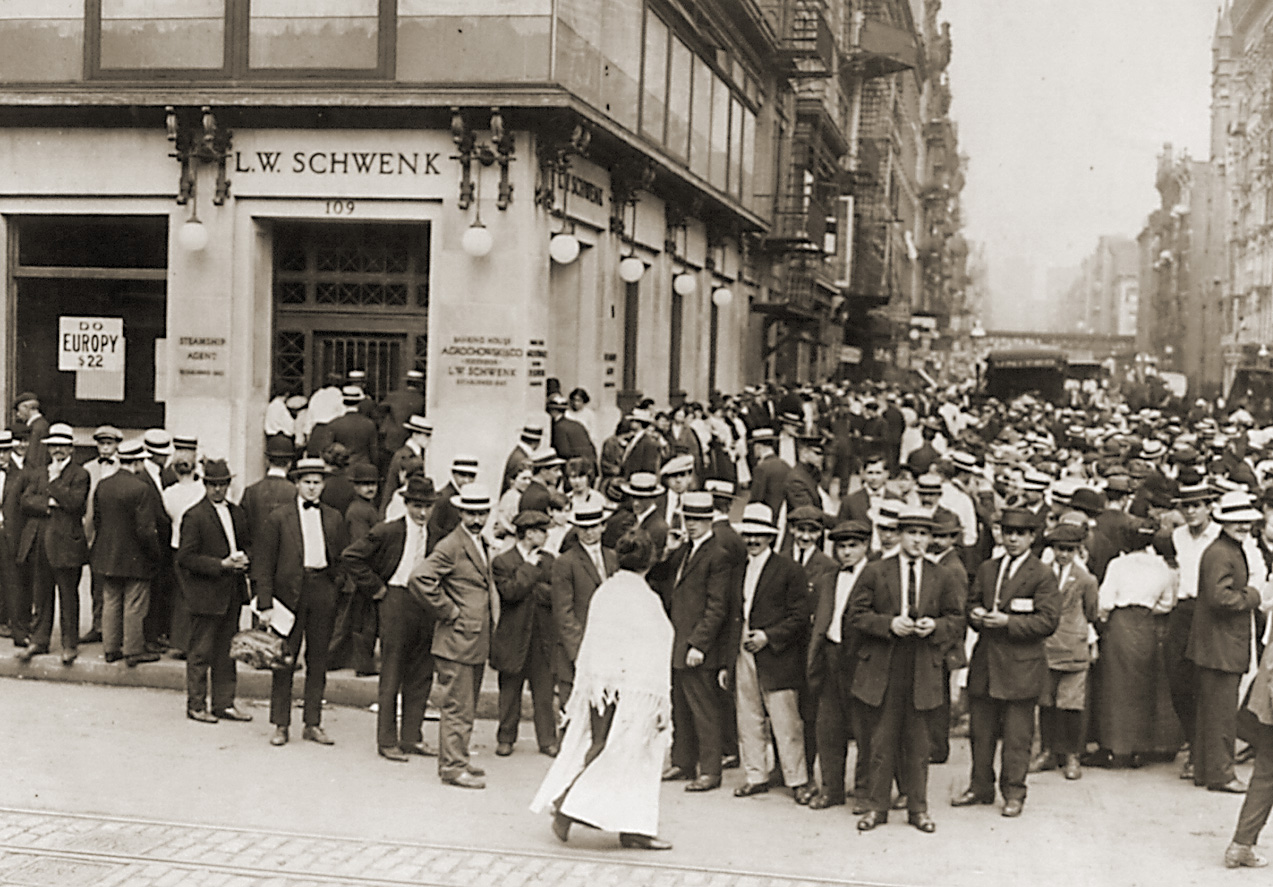
Depositors "run" on a failing New York City bank in an effort to recover their money, July 1914

A bank failure occurs when a bank is unable to meet its obligations to its depositors or other creditors because it has become insolvent or too illiquid to meet its liabilities. Failing banks share commonalities: rising asset losses, deteriorating solvency, and an increasing reliance on expensive noncore funding.

A bank typically fails economically when the market value of its assets falls below the market value of its liabilities. The insolvent bank either borrows from other solvent banks or sells its assets at a lower price than its market value to generate liquid money to pay its depositors on demand. The inability of the solvent banks to lend liquid money to the insolvent bank creates a bank panic among the depositors as more depositors try to take out cash deposits from the bank. As such, the bank is unable to fulfill the demands of all of its depositors on time. A bank may be taken over by the regulating government agency if its shareholders' equity are below the regulatory minimum.

The failure of a bank is generally considered to be of more importance than the failure of other types of business firms because of the interconnectedness and fragility of banking institutions. Research has shown that the market value of customers of the failed banks is adversely affected at the date of the failure announcements. It is often feared that the spill over effects of a failure of one bank can quickly spread throughout the economy and possibly result in the failure of other banks, whether or not those banks were solvent at the time as the marginal depositors try to take out cash deposits from these banks to avoid from suffering losses. Thereby, the spill over effect of bank panic or systemic risk has a multiplier effect on all banks and financial institutions leading to a greater effect of bank failure in the economy. As a result, banking institutions are typically subjected to rigorous regulation, and bank failures are of major public policy concern in countries across the world.

== Notable acquisitions of failed banks ==
The following table lists significant acquisitions of failed banks, illustrating the scale and impact of major bank failures. It does not include partial purchases by governments to prevent bank or banking system failures, such as government intervention during the subprime mortgage crisis:

Announcement date	Target	Acquirer	Transaction value (US$ billion)	Notes
1999-11-29	(United Kingdom) National Westminster Bank Plc	Royal Bank of Scotland	42.5	
2003-10-27	(United States) FleetBoston Financial	(United States) Bank of America	47	
2004-01-15	(United States) Bank One Corporation	(United States) JPMorgan Chase	58	
2006-01-01	(United States) MBNA	(United States) Bank of America	34.2	
2007-05-20	(Italy) Capitalia	(Italy) UniCredit	29.47	
2007-09-28	(United States) NetBank	(Netherlands) ING Group	0.014	
2008-02-22	(United Kingdom) Northern Rock	Government of the United Kingdom	41.213	
2008-04-01	(United States) Bear Stearns	(United States) JPMorgan	2.2	
2008-07-01	(United States) Countrywide Financial	(United States) Bank of America	4	
2008-07-10	(Denmark) Roskilde Bank	Nationalbanken (Centralbank of Denmark)	15	
2008-07-14	(United Kingdom) Alliance & Leicester	(Spain) Santander	1.93	
2008-08-31	(Germany) Dresdner Kleinwort	(Germany) Commerzbank	10.812	
2008-09-07	(United States) Fannie Mae and Freddie Mac	(United States) Federal Housing Finance Agency	5,000	Federal conservatorship with expected return to independent management
2008-09-14	(United States) Merrill Lynch	(United States) Bank of America	44	
2008-09-17	(United States) Lehman Brothers	(United Kingdom) Barclays	1.3	
2008-09-18	(United Kingdom) HBOS	(United Kingdom) Lloyds TSB	33.475	
2008-09-26	(United States) Lehman Brothers	(Japan) Nomura Holdings	1.3	
2008-09-26	(United States) Washington Mutual	(United States) JPMorgan	1.9	
2008-09-28	(United Kingdom) Bradford & Bingley	Government of the United Kingdom (Spain) Santander	1.838	
2008-09-28	(Belgium) (Luxembourg) (Netherlands) Fortis	(France) BNP Paribas	12.356	
2008-09-29	(United Kingdom) Abbey National	Government of the United Kingdom (Spain) Santander	2.298	
2008-09-30	(Belgium) Dexia	The Governments of Belgium, France and Luxembourg	7.06	
2008-10-03	(United States) Wachovia	(United States) Wells Fargo	15	
2008-10-03	(Netherlands) ABN AMRO (Netherlands) Fortis	(Netherlands) NL Financial Investments (Ministry of Finance )	23.3	Breakup, nationalization of some components with return to publicly traded company
2008-10-07	(Iceland) Landsbanki	(Iceland) Icelandic Financial Supervisory Authority	4.192	UK assets seized by UK government; bad assets nationalized by Iceland and retail operations reorganized as Landsbankinn
2008-10-08	(Iceland) Glitnir	(Iceland) Icelandic Financial Supervisory Authority	3.254	
2008-10-09	(Iceland) Kaupthing Bank	(Iceland) Icelandic Financial Supervisory Authority	1.257	
2008-10-13	(United Kingdom) Lloyds Banking Group	Government of the United Kingdom	26.045	2008 United Kingdom bank rescue package
2008-10-13	Royal Bank of Scotland Group	Government of the United Kingdom	30.641	2008 United Kingdom bank rescue package
2008-10-14	(United States) Bank of America	Federal government of the United States	45	Troubled Asset Relief Program
2008-10-14	(United States) Bank of New York Mellon	Federal government of the United States	3	Troubled Asset Relief Program
2008-10-14	(United States) Goldman Sachs	Federal government of the United States	10	Troubled Asset Relief Program
2008-10-14	(United States) JPMorgan	Federal government of the United States	25	Troubled Asset Relief Program
2008-10-14	(United States) Morgan Stanley	Federal government of the United States	10	Troubled Asset Relief Program
2008-10-14	(United States) State Street	Federal government of the United States	2	Troubled Asset Relief Program
2008-10-14	(United States) Wells Fargo	Federal government of the United States	25	Troubled Asset Relief Program
2009-02-11	(Republic of Ireland) Allied Irish Bank	Government of the Republic of Ireland	3.861	Post-2008 Irish banking crisis
2009-02-11	(Republic of Ireland) Anglo Irish Bank	Government of the Republic of Ireland	13.57	Anglo Irish Bank Corporation Act 2009
2009-02-11	(Republic of Ireland) Bank of Ireland	Government of the Republic of Ireland	3.861	Post-2008 Irish banking crisis
2009-03-19	(United States) IndyMac	(United States) OneWest Bank	unknown	
2012-03-13	(Greece) Alpha Bank	Government of Greece	2.096	Greek government-debt crisis
2012-03-13	(Greece) Eurobank	Government of Greece	4.633	Greek government-debt crisis
2012-03-13	National Bank of Greece	Government of Greece	7.612	Greek government-debt crisis
2012-03-13	(Greece) Piraeus Bank	Government of Greece	5.516	Greek government-debt crisis
2012-03-25	(Cyprus) Laiki Bank	Bank of Cyprus	10.812	2012–2013 Cypriot financial crisis
2012-05-25	(Spain) Bankia	Government of Spain	20.962	2008–2014 Spanish financial crisis
2012-06-07	(Portugal) Caixa Geral de Depositos	Government of Portugal	1.78	2010–2014 Portuguese financial crisis
2012-06-07	(Portugal) Millennium BCP	Government of Portugal	3.3	2010–2014 Portuguese financial crisis

== Bank failures in the U.S. ==
In the U.S., deposits in savings and checking accounts are backed by the FDIC. As of 1933, each account owner is insured up to $250,000 in the event of a bank failure. When a bank fails, in addition to insuring the deposits, the FDIC acts as the receiver of the failed bank, taking control of the bank's assets and deciding how to settle its debts. The number of bank failures has been tracked and published by the FDIC since 1934, and has decreased after a peak in 2010 due to the 2008 financial crisis.

Since the year 2000, over 500 banks have failed. The 2010s saw the most bank failures in recent memory, with 367 banks collapsing over that decade. However, while the 2010s saw the most banks fail, it wasn't the worst decade in terms of the value of the banks going under. The 2000s saw 192 banks go under with $533 billion in assets ($749 billion in 2023 dollars) compared to the $273 billion ($354 billion) lost in the 2010s.

No advance notice is given to the public when a bank fails. Under ideal circumstances, a bank failure can occur without customers losing access to their funds at any point. For example, in the 2008 failure of Washington Mutual the FDIC was able to broker a deal in which JP Morgan Chase bought the assets of Washington Mutual for $1.9 billion. Existing customers were immediately turned into JP Morgan Chase customers, without disruption in their ability to use their ATM cards or do banking at branches. An FDIC study of three bank failures in spring 2023 found that depositors with substantial uninsured funds were far more likely to run, while fully insured retail depositors generally did not run before the banks failed.

== Global failure ==
The failure of a bank is relevant not only to the country in which it is headquartered, but for all other nations with which it conducts business. This dynamic was highlighted during the 2008 financial crisis, when the failures of major bulge bracket investment banks affected local economies globally. This interconnectedness was manifested not on a high level, with respect to deals negotiated between major companies from different parts of the world, but also to the global nature of any one company's makeup. Outsourcing is a key example of this makeup; as major banks such as Lehman Brothers and Bear Stearns failed, the employees from countries other than the United States suffered in turn. A 2015 analysis by the Bank of England found greater interconnectedness between banks has led to a greater transmission of stresses during a time of recession.

== See also ==
- Bank run
- Causes of the Great Depression
- List of banks acquired or bankrupted in the United States during the 2008 financial crisis
- List of bank failures in the United States (2008–present)
- List of largest bank failures in the United States
- Too big to fail
- Volcker Rule
- Zombie bank
