= 2010 Icelandic Icesave referendum =

Referendum held in Iceland on 6 March 2010

- 6 March 2010
- Act No. 1/2010 provides for amendments to Act No. 96/2009, which authorizes the Treasury Secretary to provide a State guarantee on bonds issued by the British and Dutch governments to the Investors' and Investors' Guarantee Fund, at the expense of the Treasury, in order to make payments to the investors of the Landsbanki Íslands hf. The Althing passed Law No. 1/2010 but the President refused to sign it. Should Law No. 1/2010 remain in force?

Results
Choice	Votes	%
Yes	2,599	1.90%
No	134,392	98.10%
Valid votes	136,991	94.98%
Invalid or blank votes	7,240	5.02%
Total votes	144,231	100.00%
Registered voters/turnout	229,926	62.73%

The 2010 Icesave referendum (Icelandic: Þjóðaratkvæðagreiðsla um Icesave), was held in Iceland on 6 March 2010.

The referendum was held to approve the terms of a state guarantee on the obligation of the Depositors' and Investors' Guarantee Fund (Tryggingarsjóður innstæðueigenda og fjárfesta), in particular a €3.8 billion loan (€11,964 per person) from the governments of the United Kingdom and the Netherlands to cover deposit insurance obligations in those countries. The referendum was held under article 26 of the Constitution of Iceland after President Ólafur Ragnar Grímsson refused to counter-sign the corresponding Act of Parliament (known as the second Icesave bill) into law on 5 January 2010. The proposal was resoundingly defeated, with 98% voting against and less than 2% in favor.

The referendum was the first to be held in Iceland since 1944, and required special legislation. The Althing (Iceland's parliament) approved a motion on 8 January 2010 which called for the referendum to be held by 6 March at the latest. The motion passed by 49–0 with 14 abstentions. The date of the referendum was later set for 6 March.

== Background ==
The liabilities of the Depositors' and Investors' Guarantee Fund arise from the 2008–2012 Icelandic financial crisis, which saw Iceland's three main commercial banks collapse within the space of a week. One of those banks, Landsbanki, had taken retail deposits from more than 400,000 British and Dutch customers through its branches in London and Amsterdam, through a product known as "Icesave".

At the time of the economic collapse, the Depositors' and Investors' Guarantee Fund had equity of only 10.8 billion krónur, (Note: ISK8.3bn at the end of 2007 (Financial statements 2007) plus ISK2.5bn raised in 2008 to keep within the statutory minimum (Press release).) about €68 million at the exchange rates of the time and far from sufficient to cover the Dutch and British claims. The initial reaction of the Icelandic authorities was to disclaim state responsibility for the shortfall in the insurance fund, pointing out that both the Guarantee Fund and Landsbanki were private corporations (although the Guarantee Fund was set up and operated under a specific Act of Parliament). One of the governors of the Central Bank of Iceland, former Prime Minister Davíð Oddsson, was interviewed on Icelandic public service broadcaster RÚV and stated that "we [the Icelandic State] do not intend to pay the debts of the banks that have been a little heedless". This led to a diplomatic dispute, and the unprecedented (and controversial) freezing of Landsbanki assets in the United Kingdom through the Landsbanki Freezing Order 2008.

An outline agreement was reached on 16 November 2008, after mediation by France and the European Union. Iceland agreed to guarantee the liabilities of the Depositors' and Investors' Guarantee Fund to British and Dutch savers, while the UK and the Netherlands would effectively lend the Guarantee Fund the necessary money. However, the exact terms of the repayment of the loan were not finalized at the time, and negotiations continued into 2009, held up somewhat by the collapse of the Icelandic government in January 2009 and the subsequent elections in April.

=== Loan agreement ===
Iceland finally reached bilateral agreements with the United Kingdom and the Netherlands on 5 June 2009. The liabilities of the Depositors' and Investors' Guarantee Fund were £2.35 billion in the UK and €1.2 billion in the Netherlands. The governments agreed that the money would be paid back between 2017 and 2023, so that repayments on the deposit insurance loan would not coincide with the repayment of loans from the International Monetary Fund (IMF), to whom Iceland had to turn during the financial crisis.

=== First Icesave bill ===
On 28 August 2009, the Althing (Iceland's parliament) voted 34–15 (with 14 abstentions) to approve a bill (commonly referred to as the Icesave bill) to regulate the repayments. Initially opposed in June, the bill was passed after amendments were added which set a ceiling on the repayment based on the country's gross domestic product (GDP). Under the measure, up to 4% of Iceland's GDP growth (in sterling terms, from a 2008 base) would be paid to Britain from 2017 to 2023 while the Netherlands would receive up to 2% of Iceland's GDP growth for the same period. Opponents of the bill argued that Icelanders, already reeling from the crisis, should not have to pay for mistakes made by private banks under the watch of other governments. However, the government argued that if the bill failed to pass, the UK and the Netherlands might retaliate by blocking disbursements from the IMF.

== Second Icesave bill ==
The British and Dutch governments did not accept the amendments to the negotiated deal that had been placed into the first Icesave bill, and without a mutually agreed deal continued opposition to payment of the second tranche of the IMF loans. Revised loan agreements negotiations, including the cap on repayments, were concluded on 19 October 2009 and the issue went back to the Althing on the same day. A second Icesave bill was passed on 30 December by 33–30 (no abstentions).

The bill was presented to President Ólafur Ragnar Grímsson at a routine meeting of the government the next morning. Grímsson refused to sign the bill immediately, pointing out that it was less than 24 hours since it had been passed by the Althing, and asked for more time to consider it. Article 26 of the Constitution of Iceland states that bills passed by the Althing must be counter-signed by the President within fourteen days or face a national referendum.

The President had previously scheduled a meeting for 2 January 2010 with campaigners from the "InDefence" movement, which opposes the bill. At the meeting Indefence presented a petition bearing 56,089 signatures (nearly 25% of the Icelandic electorate) urging Grímsson not to sign the bill. By 4 January, the number of signatories had risen to 62,000. However, the leaders of the Confederation of Labor (ASÍ), the Federation of State and Municipal Employees (BSRB), the Confederation of Employers (SA) and the Federation of Icelandic Industries (SI) all urged the President to pass the legislation.

Grímsson announced his decision not to sign the bill at a press conference in his official residence (Bessastaðir) on the morning of 5 January 2010.

=== Reactions before the referendum ===
The Icelandic government, led by Prime Minister Jóhanna Sigurðardóttir, immediately expressed its "disappointment" with the President's decision and stressed that "the government of Iceland remains fully committed to implementing the bilateral loan agreements and thus the state guarantee provided for by the law."

The UK Financial Services Secretary, Lord Myners, responded saying that "The Icelandic people, if they took that decision [not to accept the bill], would effectively be saying that Iceland doesn't want to be part of the international financial system," while Dutch Minister of Finance Wouter Bos called such a decision "unacceptable", saying that, whatever the outcome of the referendum, Iceland would still be "compelled to pay back the money". A spokesman for UK Prime Minister Gordon Brown reacted in similar terms: "The Government expects the loan to be repaid. We are obviously very disappointed by the decision by the Icelandic President, but we do expect Iceland to live up to its legal obligations and repay the money."

Norway announced that its promised loan to Iceland would not be paid out before the national referendum has been settled. The Norwegian loan is part of a €1.775bn package agreed between Iceland and the four other Nordic countries on 1 July 2009.

Credit rating agency Fitch lowered its rating on Icelandic sovereign debt from BBB− to BB+ (junk-bond grade).

== Results ==
Icelandic loan guarantees referendum, 2010
Choice	Votes	%
For	2,599	1.90
Against	134,392	98.10
Total	136,991	100.00
Valid votes	136,991	94.98
Invalid/blank votes	7,240	5.02
Total votes	144,231	100.00
Registered voters/turnout	229,926	62.73

== See also ==
- 2011 Icelandic Icesave referendum
- Icesave dispute
