= EFTA Surveillance Authority v Iceland =

- Court: EFTA Court
- Full case name: EFTA Surveillance Authority, applicant, supported by the European Commission, intervener, v Iceland, defendant
- Decided: January 28, 2013
- Citation: Case E-16/11 [2013] EFTA Ct. Rep. 4

Court membership
- Judges sitting: Carl Baudenbacher, Páll Hreinsson, Ola Mestad

Case opinions
- Application dismissed in its entirety. The Court found that Directive 94/19/EC placed no obligation on EEA States to insure deposits other than to establish a deposit insurance scheme in accordance with the Directive. The Court found that Iceland had established such a scheme and that it did not discriminate on grounds of nationality in the context of the issuance of payments to depositors.
- Decision by: Carl Baudenbacher, Páll Hreinsson, Ola Mestad

EFTA Surveillance Authority v Iceland was a case brought before the EFTA Court by the European Free Trade Association Surveillance Authority against Iceland following the Icesave dispute.

Following the final result of the 2011 Icelandic loan guarantee referendum, the European Free Trade Association Surveillance Authority (ESA) lodged a formal application with the EFTA Court. The case was opened on 15 December 2011, and has received defence and written observations from the governments of Iceland, UK, Netherlands, Norway and Liechtenstein as well as the EFTA Surveillance Authority and the European Commission.

The oral hearing in the case took place on 18 September 2012. The judgment was delivered on 28 January 2013, in Iceland's favour. The court dismissed the application of the EFTA Surveillance Authority and ordered the authority to pay its own costs and the costs incurred by Iceland.

== The case ==
Following the collapse of Landsbanki in October 2008, the governments of the UK and Netherlands guaranteed for the deposits in Landsbanki's foreign branches. According to the Directive on deposit-guarantee schemes (94/19/EC) as implemented in Icelandic law (Act No. 98/1999), Iceland's deposit-guarantee schemes must cover up to €20,000 of deposits per person made in Landsbanki's foreign branches. Since the Icelandic deposit-guarantee scheme did not cover this sum, ESA claims that Iceland breached the Directive, specifically articles 3, 4, 7 and 10. In addition, ESA claims that Iceland has breached Article 4 of the EEA Agreement, by discriminating on grounds of nationality.

The Government of Iceland claims that it has implemented a deposit-guarantee scheme "in accordance with the manner in which the Directive has been implemented across the EU", satisfying the requirements of the Directive. Although the deposit-guarantee scheme was unable to "cope with the failure of 85% of the Icelandic banking system within a few days in October 2008", this does not require the Icelandic Government to be liable "to pay the sums specified in the Directive in the event that the deposit-guarantee scheme fails". Also, Iceland did not discriminate on the grounds of nationality, when it transferred domestic depositors to a new bank.

ESA answers that the wording "obligation of result" as used in the Directive "means that in all circumstances depositors must receive the minimum compensation required by the Directive." It is up to the member state to decide how this should take place. Concerning discriminating on grounds of nationality, ESA writes:

The Icelandic authorities took two measures in respect of depositors in domestic branches. First, they moved them to new banks with the consequence that those depositors, unlike the depositors in the foreign branches, never lost access to their deposits. Second, the Icelandic Government issued a declaration on 6 October 2008 that it would guarantee deposits in domestic branches in full, as mentioned in paragraph 34 of the Application.

Thus, on or before 5 October 2008, all depositors in the branches of Landsbanki were in the same position: all were depositors in a failing bank, likely to lose access to their deposits. By 9 October 2008, the depositors in the domestic branches still had full access to their deposits and a Government declaration guaranteeing their deposits in full. The depositors in the foreign branches had been left out in the cold with no access to their deposits and only the minimum guarantee of the TIF.

The Authority repeats that it is a breach of the Directive read in the light of Article 4 EEA to differentiate between depositors protected under the Directive by providing protection for some depositors while leaving others without any or any comparable protection.

— EFTA Surveillance Authority

A further Icelandic reply concerning the "obligation of result" states:

The Icelandic Government contends that there is no "obligation of result" upon the State to ensure that a properly established deposit-guarantee scheme is able to pay compensation in all circumstances, and, in particular, the wholly exceptional circumstances of a systemic bank failure.

The Authority confuses the "obligation of result" imposed upon the Contracting States by the Directive, with the social result of improved deposit protection sought by the Directive.

It is essential to consider the Authority's argument against the economic realities. The Authority does not dispute the primary facts set out in the Icelandic Government's Defence. Thus it is accordingly not contested that (inter alia):

- a. The Icelandic Deposit Guarantee Scheme was funded in a manner that was entirely in accordance with EU norms, as explained in the Commission's Impact Assessment.
- b. The cost of funding the deposit guarantee scheme in each Member State of the EU in the event of a system-wide banking crisis would average 83% of gross domestic product ("GDP"). Within that average there is wide variance, with the exposure of one state as high as 372% of GDP. The Icelandic Government respectfully refers the Court to the analysis conducted by the Icelandic Institute of Economic Studies, none of which is challenged by the Authority.
- c. No deposit-guarantee scheme could have withstood the shocks upon the Icelandic banking system that occurred in October 2008.

The foregoing facts do not reflect a Europe-wide failure by the Contracting States to properly implement the Directive. If there had been such a failure, it might have been expected that the Commission would have commented as such in its Impact Assessment. Rather, they reflect the practical realities of deposit-guarantee schemes. It is inherent to those schemes that they cannot pay out in the event of a widespread banking failure, any more than a fire insurer would be able to pay out if an entire city were to be destroyed by fire, rather than a single house or street.

That does not mean that deposit-guarantee schemes are defective. They simply cannot, however, provide cover against any eventuality, no matter how extreme.

The Commission was well aware of this limitation to deposit-guarantee schemes when it first proposed the Directive, and as a result made no provision for any such guarantee. As noted in Iceland's Defence, the Commission explicitly acknowledged that the Directive did not address the circumstances where "the schemes' resources have been exhausted". This practical reality is also fully reflected in the Commission's Impact Assessment. It recognised that deposit-guarantee schemes could not deal with large-scale banking failures.

This reality is simply ignored by the Authority. It instead seeks to derive an "obligation of result" upon the State to achieve a result that no deposit guarantee scheme could itself achieve: a guarantee that applied to every account holder irrespective of the scale of the financial crisis.

— The Government of Iceland

The Government of Norway has filed a written observation with the court concerning a State's obligation to guarantee compensation with its own funds, writing:

The Authority claims in its Application that the Directive imposes an obligation of result on the States which in essence is twofold: The States are to ensure both that a deposit guarantee scheme is set up, and that duly verified claims by depositors of unavailable deposits are paid within the deadline laid down in Article 10 of the Directive. The Authority holds that the States must take all appropriate measures to ensure fulfilment of that obligation.

The Authority, despite underlining that it does not seek a declaration that Iceland must compensate depositors from public funds, nevertheless asserts that the States' obligation of result

"may mean, should all else fail, that the state will ultimately be responsible for the compensation of depositors up to the amount provided for in Article 7, in order to discharge its duties under Directive 94/19/EC".

In the Government's view, this can for all practical purposes be regarded as a claim that the Directive imposes an obligation on the State to guarantee compensation to depositors through its own funds, as a last resort.

The Government disagrees with such a reading of the Directive[...]

— The Government of Norway

== Judge Dismissal ==
A Norwegian judge, Per Christiansen was dismissed from the EFTA panel following remarks he made to the media, suggestions made in legal analysis, that he may have supported the EFTA case, and through the court, the UK and the Netherlands position.

== Relevant law ==
The Directive on deposit-guarantee schemes (94/19/EC)

- Article 3 (1)

Each Member State shall ensure that within its territory one or more deposit-guarantee schemes are introduced and officially recognized. Except in the circumstances envisaged in the second subparagraph and in paragraph 4, no credit institution authorized in that Member State pursuant to Article 3 of Directive 77/780/EEC may take deposits unless it is a member of such a scheme.

- Article 4 (1)

Deposit-guarantee schemes introduced and officially recognized in a Member State in accordance with Article 3 (1) shall cover the depositors at branches set up by credit institutions in other Member States.

Until 31 December 1999 neither the level nor the scope, including the percentage, of cover provided shall exceed the maximum level or scope of cover offered by the corresponding guarantee scheme within the territory of the host Member State.

Before that date, the Commission shall draw up a report on the basis of the experience acquired in applying the second subparagraph and shall consider the need to continue those arrangements. If appropriate, the Commission shall submit a proposal for a Directive to the European Parliament and the Council, with a view to the extension of their

- Article 7 (1)

Deposit-guarantee schemes shall stipulate that the aggregate deposits of each depositor must be covered up to ECU 20 000 in the event of deposits' being unavailable. Until 31 December 1999 Member States in which, when this Directive is adopted, deposits are not covered up to ECU 20 000 may retain the maximum amount laid down in their guarantee schemes, provided that this amount is not less than ECU 15 000.

- Article 10 (1)

Deposit-guarantee schemes shall be in a position to pay duly verified claims by depositors in respect of unavailable deposits within three months of the date on which the competent authorities make the determination described in Article 1 (3) (i) or the judicial authority makes the ruling described in Article 1 (3) (ii).

EEA Agreement Article 4

Within the scope of application of this Agreement, and without prejudice to any special provisions contained therein, any discrimination on grounds of nationality shall be prohibited.

== See also ==
- Icesave dispute
