= Icesave dispute =

Dispute between Iceland and foreign depositors

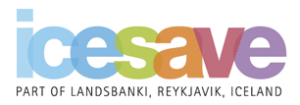
Icesave logo

The Icesave dispute was a diplomatic dispute among Iceland, the Netherlands and the United Kingdom. It began after the privately owned Icelandic bank Landsbanki was placed in receivership on 7 October 2008. As Landsbanki was one of three systemically important financial institutions in Iceland to go bankrupt within a few days, the Icelandic Depositors' and Investors' Guarantee Fund (Tryggingarsjóður) had no remaining funds to make good on deposit guarantees to foreign Landsbanki depositors, who held savings in the Icesave branch of the bank.

== History ==
When Landsbanki was placed into receivership by the Icelandic Financial Supervisory Authority (FME), 343,306 retail depositors in the UK and Netherlands that held accounts in the "Icesave" branch of Landsbanki lost a total of €6.7 bn of savings. Because no immediate repayment was expected by any Icelandic institutions, the Dutch and British national deposit guarantee schemes covered repayment up to the maximum limit for the national deposit guarantees – and the Dutch and British states covered the rest.

The dispute centred on the demand by the British and Dutch states that the Icelandic state should repay the Icelandic minimum deposit guarantees (up to €20,887 per account holder), equal to £2.35 bn (€2.7 bn) repaid to the UK and €1.3 bn repaid to the Netherlands. The Icelandic state refused to take on this liability on behalf of the guarantee fund. Originally this was because the state lost funding access at credit markets due to the 2008–2011 Icelandic financial crisis, but later proposed bilateral loan guarantees for repayment were rejected by Icelandic voters in two separate referendums. The Icesave disputes and associated referendums sparked a nationalist backlash in Iceland, which some scholars have attributed as a factor in reducing support in Iceland for EU accession.

The Icesave bill 1 was the first negotiated loan agreement, attempting to define the repayment terms for these two loans. It was enacted on 2 September 2009 but was not accepted by the governments of the UK and Netherlands, due to a unilaterally attached term added by the Icelandic parliament which limited Iceland's repayment guarantee only to 2024, with automatic cancellation of any potential owing still existing beyond this year. Instead, UK and Netherlands then counter proposed a new version of the loan agreement, referred to as Icesave bill 2, where no time limit was included for the Icelandic state's repayment guarantee. This was at first accepted by the Icelandic parliament, but the Icelandic president refused to enact the law and referred approval to a referendum being held on 6 March 2010, where voters subsequently rejected the law.

After the rejection of Icesave bill 2, renewed negotiations started on the terms for the repayment agreement. The negotiations resulted, in December 2010, in an adjusted agreement named Icesave bill 3, with better terms for Iceland. This included the removal of a previous creditor priority issue, a lower 3% interest rate, an interest moratorium until 1 October 2009, and a possible extension of the "repayment window" up to 30 years. When the Icesave bill 3 was put to a referendum in April 2011, it was again rejected, by 59% of Icelandic voters. After analysing the election result, stakeholders decided not to attempt negotiation of a further improved Icesave bill 4, but instead to refer the case to the EFTA Court as a legal dispute.

On 28 January 2013, the EFTA Court cleared Iceland of all charges, meaning that Iceland was freed from the disputed obligation for deposit guarantees worth €4.0 bn (ISK 674 bn) plus accrued interest to UK and the Netherlands. This caused shock, as some legal experts had suggested the EFTA Surveillance Authority would win. The repayment claim still existed as a claim on the Landsbanki receivership, who one year earlier had been ordered by the Supreme Court of Iceland to repay confiscated deposits (including minimum deposit guarantees) as priority claims, totaling ISK 852 bn (£4.46 bn, €5.03 bn) to the UK Financial Services Compensation Scheme and ISK 282 bn (€1.67 bn) to De Nederlandsche Bank. By January 2016, the Landsbanki receivership had, through liquidation of assets, repaid all the priority claims.

== Icesave ==
Icesave was an online savings account brand owned and operated by the private Landsbanki bank from 2006 to 2008 that offered savings accounts. It operated in two countries – the United Kingdom (from October 2006) and the Netherlands (from May 2008). The bank intended to roll the brand out to additional territories in 2008 and 2009.

In the UK, Icesave's marketing slogan was "clear difference", and it offered three types of savings accounts: an immediate-access savings account, cash ISA (Individual Savings Account), and a range of fixed-rate bonds. Interest rates on these accounts were over 6 per cent, among the best rates offered by online banks to UK customers at the time (2006–07). At the time of Landsbanki's collapse, the bank had over 300,000 Icesave customers in the UK, with deposits of over £4 billion (€5 billion).

In the Netherlands, Icesave's marketing slogan was "de transparante spaarbank" (English: "the transparent savings bank"). It offered a single type of account: an immediate-access savings account which initially offered 5 per cent interest, later increased to 5.25 per cent. In the five months that it operated in the Netherlands, Icesave attracted more than 125,000 customers who deposited €1.7 billion.

Icesave accounts were accounts with Landsbanki's branches in London and Amsterdam, as the logo used in the United Kingdom made clear: "Icesave, part of Landsbanki, Reykjavik, Iceland". As Icesave was marketed as part of Landsbanki, the later complaints of the United Kingdom and Netherlands related to different treatment of Icelandic Landsbanki accounts and Icesave accounts.

== Kaupthing Edge ==
Kaupthing Edge was an online savings brand owned and operated by Kaupthing Bank and its subsidiaries from 2007 to 2008. It offered savings accounts only to personal savers and operated in ten countries. One major difference between Kaupthing Edge and Icesave was that Kaupthing Edge accounts were usually held not with branches but with subsidiaries. This means responsibility for regulation of the subsidiaries and provision of deposit guarantees rested with the host countries.

In four cases Kaupthing Edge accounts were held in branches:

- Finland, from October 2007.
- Norway, from January 2008.
- Germany, from March 2008, attracting about 30,000 depositors.
- Austria, from 4 September 2008, attracting 200–300 customers with about €3 million in deposits.

In Finland and Norway, the local financial supervisors took over Kaupthing's operations and guaranteed deposits. In Austria, a private agreement was reached between the Austrian authorities and Kaupthing's receivers, with accounts being transferred to other banks. In Germany there were serious problems with deposit insurance – identical to those suffered by Icesave depositors in the UK and the Netherlands. In this case, German authorities quickly seized all assets and deposits in Germany before the Icelandic managers were able to move them, thus preventing them from being transferred to Iceland or other offshore accounts. German depositors started to get their capital back on 22 June 2009, but lost accrued interest.

== Collapse of Landsbanki ==
There had been concern about possible weakness of the Icelandic banking system throughout 2008, especially following the decline in value of the ISK, Icelandic króna, (35 per cent from January to September 2008). Iceland's three major banks: Kaupthing, Landsbanki and Glitnir were all highly leveraged by international standards, and their combined foreign debt was more than five times Iceland's gross domestic product (GDP). During the 2008 financial crisis, this debt became increasingly difficult to refinance, especially after the collapse in mid-September of U.S. financial-services firm Lehman Brothers. Matters came to a head during the weekend of 4–5 October, with numerous comments in the British press and on discussion forums questioning the solvency of Icelandic banks. This prompted a run on deposits in the UK (and possibly in other markets).

On 6 October, the Icelandic government pushed an emergency law through Iceland's parliament, the Althing, in response to the "unusual financial market circumstances". In a separate measure, the government also guaranteed "that deposits in domestic commercial and savings banks and their branches in Iceland will be fully covered." That evening, the Guernsey subsidiary of Landsbanki went into voluntary administration with the approval of the Guernsey Financial Services Commission. The administrators later said that "The main reason for the Bank’s difficulties has been the placing of funds with its UK fellow subsidiary, Heritable Bank." Guernsey's Chief Minister stated "the directors of Landsbanki Guernsey took appropriate steps by putting the bank into administration."

The FME placed Landsbanki in receivership early on 7 October. A press release from the FME stated that all of Landsbanki's Icelandic branches, call centres, ATMs and internet operations will be open for business as usual, and that all "domestic deposits" were fully guaranteed. The Icesave UK website announced: "We are not currently processing any deposits or any withdrawal requests through our Icesave internet accounts. We apologise for any inconvenience this may cause our customers. We hope to provide you with more information shortly."

That evening, one of the governors of the Central Bank of Iceland, former Prime Minister Davíð Oddsson, was interviewed on Icelandic public service broadcaster RÚV and stated that "we [the Icelandic State] do not intend to pay the debts of the banks that have been a little heedless". He compared the government's measures to the U.S. intervention at Washington Mutual, and suggested that foreign creditors would "unfortunately only get 5–10–15% of their claims". A long-standing opponent of Icelandic membership of the European Union and adoption of the euro as national currency, he also claimed that "[i]f we were tied to the euro, […] we would just have to succumb to the laws of Germany and France."

Two days later, on 9 October, the Icelandic assets and liabilities of Landsbanki were transferred to a new government-owned bank, Nýi Landsbanki. As Landsbanki had been acquiring assets in Iceland with foreign loans and deposits, the assets of Nýi Landsbanki exceeded its liabilities (domestic deposits and government equity capital) by ISK 558.1 billion (€3.87bn, £3.06bn), even after Nýi Landsbanki had made provisions for over half its loans to customers. Icesave deposits, along with all foreign borrowings, remained in the old Landsbanki, which was left with ISK 1743 billion (€12.1bn, £9.56bn) in assets to face up to ISK 3197 billion of liabilities (€22.2bn, £17.5bn).

== Freezing of assets in the UK ==
Geir Haarde and Gordon Brown in happier times. This meeting, at 10 Downing Street on 24 April 2008, was the only time the two men had met prior to the 2008–11 Icelandic financial crisis. Even in April, the problems of the Icelandic banking sector were one of the topics of discussion between the two Prime Ministers.

Once the Icesave dispute had got underway, it became clear that there had been several high-level contacts between the British and Icelandic governments in the weeks (and even months) before Landsbanki's collapse. On 12 February 2008, at an International meeting in London, the Central Bank of Iceland (CBI) received the first warning sign by representatives from foreign banks and credit rating agencies, who concluded that the Icelandic banks were in a serious situation and that immediate action was needed to manage the current situation. CBI was advised to make a request towards Landsbanki, that they should prepare for a transfer of the Icesave accounts from their foreign branch into a UK subsidiary, so that it could be subject to UK law for bank supervision and the UK minimum deposit guarantee scheme. Landsbanki indeed sought legal advice for such a move on 22 February, but for unknown reasons dropped the idea in April, and although the UK Financial Services Authority (FSA) in July 2008 had insisted such a transfer into a subsidiary should happen, Landsbanki continued to run Icesave as a foreign branch until it went bankrupt.

When British Prime Minister Gordon Brown met with his Icelandic counterpart Geir Haarde in London on 24 April 2008, this was the first event where Iceland's problems with its banking sector was discussed at the highest level.

On 2 September 2008, the British Chancellor of the Exchequer, Alistair Darling, had met with Icelandic Minister of Trade, Björgvin G. Sigurðsson, to discuss how the recently increased financial problems for Icelandic-owned banks operating in the UK should be handled. It was later claimed by Björgólfur Thor Björgólfsson, son of Landsbanki's chairman of the board, that the UK FSA had agreed to take over the liability for minimum Icesave deposit guarantees under the UK Financial Services Compensation Scheme (FSCS) in return for a liquidity deposit (most likely in the form of an external bank guarantee) of £200 million (€240 million). British newspaper The Independent however reported, that the requested liquidity deposit in order to take over liabilities for minimum deposit guarantees, allegedly proposed by the UK FSA, might instead have been as high as 50 percent of the Icesave banks retail deposits (some ten-times higher), a figure which would have paralysed Landsbanki's retail operations in London. The UK FSA and Treasury subsequently denied ever to have offered such an agreement, as no such document existed in their archives.

Officials from the UK Treasury were in Reykjavík over the weekend of 4–5 October discussing the position of the Icelandic-owned banks operating in the UK, after Glitnir had failed to repay British wholesale depositors on Friday 3 October. The result of the meeting was a letter dated 5 October 2008 on behalf of the Icelandic Minister for Business Affairs, stating that: "If needed the Icelandic Government will support the Depositors' and Investors' Guarantee Fund in raising the necessary funds, so that the Fund would be able to meet the minimum compensation limits in the event of a failure of Landsbanki and its UK branch."

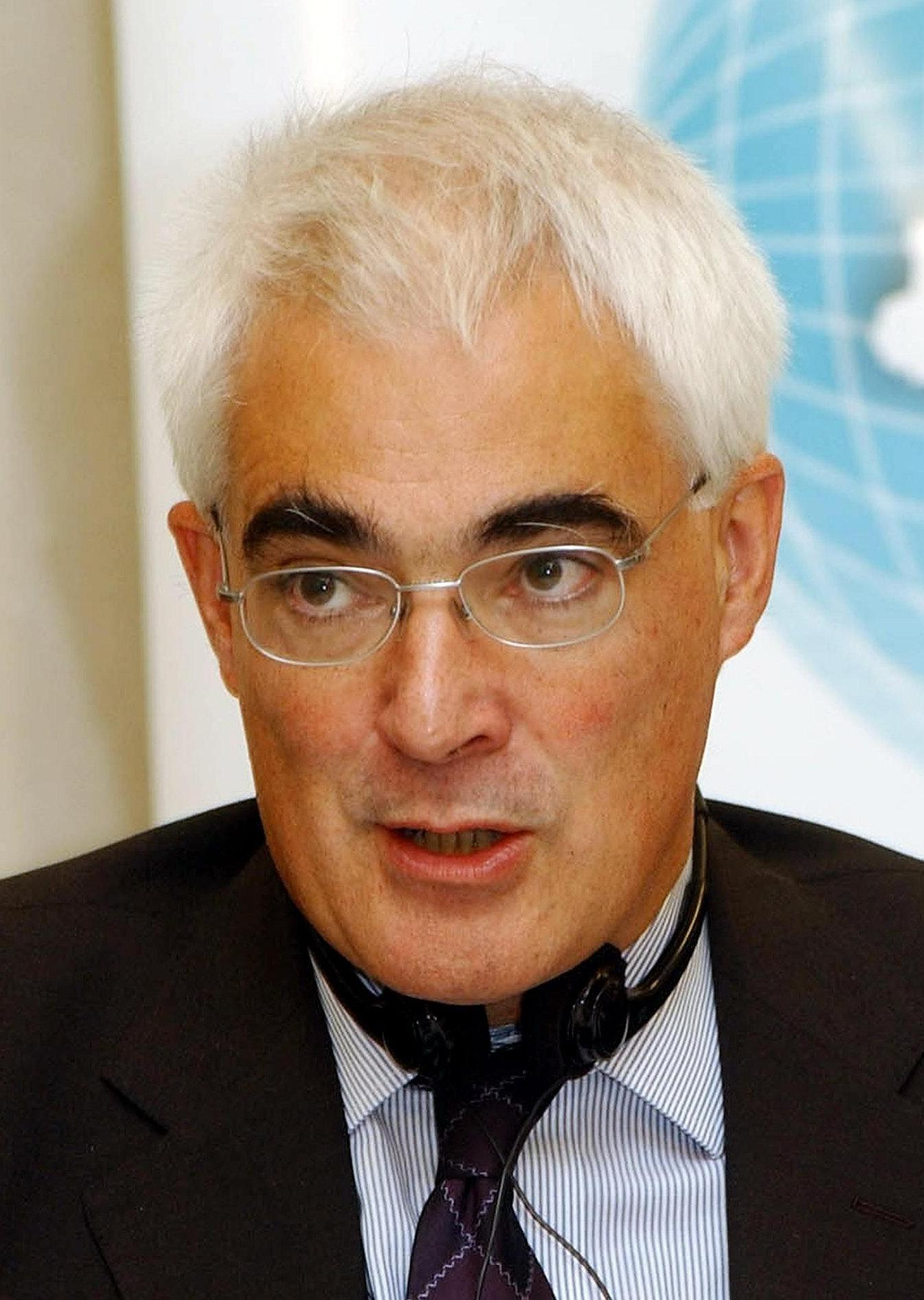
Alistair Darling, UK Chancellor of the Exchequer during the Icesave dispute

On the afternoon of 7 October, after Landsbanki had been placed into receivership – but before the Central Bank of Iceland chief, Davíð Oddsson, made his live public television appearance about how the Icelandic State would respond to foreign debt obligations left by bankrupt banks, the UK Chancellor had a telephone conversation with his Icelandic counterpart Finance Minister Árni Mathiesen in which the question of deposit insurance was raised:

[…]
Darling:	Do I understand that you guarantee the deposits of Icelandic depositors?
Mathiesen:	Yes, we guarantee the deposits in the banks and branches here in Iceland.
Darling:	But not the branches outside Iceland?
Mathiesen:	No, not outside of what was already in the letter that we sent.
Darling:	But is that not in breach of the EEA Treaty?
Mathiesen:	No, we don’t think so and think this is actually in line with what other countries have been doing over recent days.
[…]

Landsbanki Freezing Order 2008
- Statutory Instrument
- Parliament of the United Kingdom
- Citation: SI 2008/2668

Dates
- Made: 10:00 8 October 2008
- Laid before Parliament: 10:10 8 October 2008
- Commencement: 12:00 8 October 2008
- Revoked: 15 June 2009
Other legislation
Made under	Anti-terrorism, Crime and Security Act 2001
Amended by	Landsbanki Freezing (Amendment) Order 2008
Revoked by	Landsbanki Freezing (Revocation) Order 2009

Status: Revoked

Text of statute as originally enacted

On 8 October, Alistair Darling announced that he was taking steps to freeze the assets of Landsbanki in the UK. Under the Landsbanki Freezing Order 2008 (SI 2008/2668), passed at 10 a.m. on 8 October 2008 to come into force ten minutes later, the Treasury went on to freeze the assets of Landsbanki and assets belonging to the Central Bank of Iceland, and the Government of Iceland relating to Landsbanki. The freezing order took advantage of provisions in part 2 of the Anti-terrorism, Crime and Security Act 2001, and was made "because the Treasury believed that action to the detriment of the UK's economy (or part of it) had been or was likely to be taken by certain persons who are the government of or resident of a country or territory outside the UK." UK Prime Minister Gordon Brown announced that the UK government would launch legal action against Iceland. The British Treasury and FSA proceeded to freeze an estimated ISK 690.4bn (€4.0bn) worth of British assets of Landsbanki branches in Britain. Concerning Kaupthing and its British subsidiaries, the UK also managed to seize its assets and transfer them to the Dutch bank ING.

The Landsbanki Freezing Order was the first time that the UK government had used its powers to impose unilateral financial sanctions since those powers were revised in 2001. Such unilateral sanctions have never been common, but the previous version of these powers (section 2, Emergency Laws (Re-enactments and Repeals) Act 1964) had been used against Rhodesia after its Unilateral Declaration of Independence in 1965, and against Argentina during the Falklands War in 1982. The powers themselves date from the Defence (General) Regulations 1939.

== Reaction ==
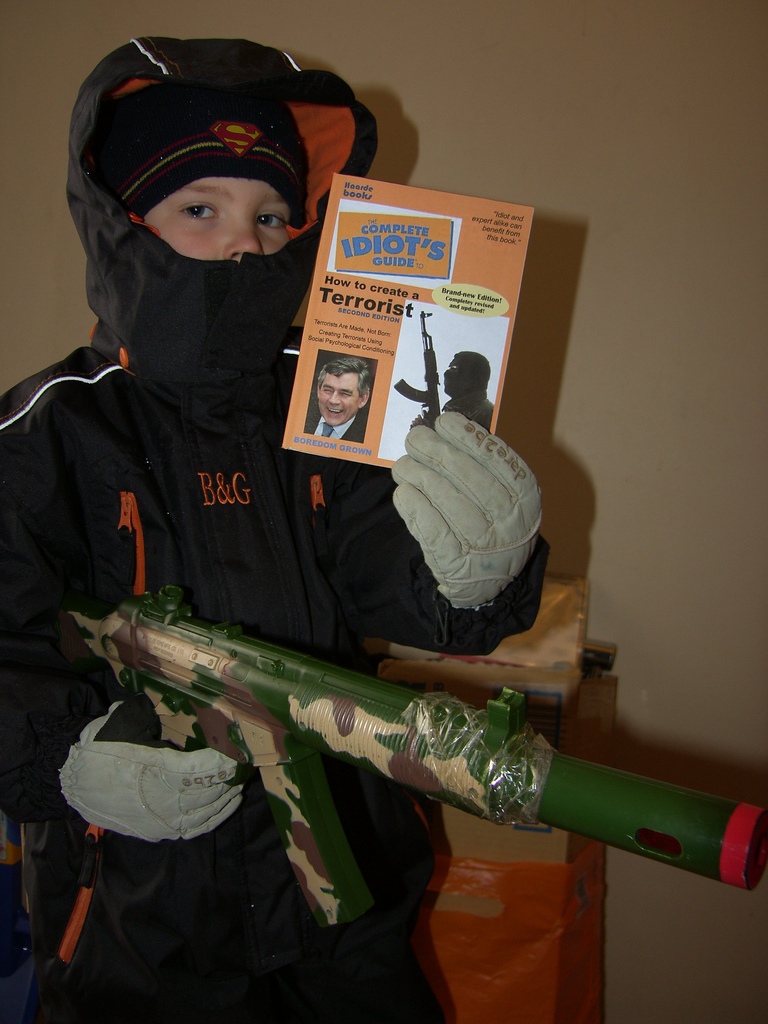
Over 80,000 people signed an online petition against Britain's use of "anti-terrorism legislation" against Landsbanki, under the theme "Icelanders are NOT terrorists". Many sent in satirical images such as this one as part of the protest.

Also on 8 October, the Prime Minister Geir Haarde issued a statement saying "The Icelandic government appreciates that the British authorities are willing to step in and respond to the immediate concerns of depositors of Landsbankinn Icesave accounts" and that "There is a good probability that the total assets of Landsbankinn will be sufficient to cover the deposits in IceSave." Later that day, he said that the Icelandic government was in no way running away from its obligations and suggested that Brown's remarks were grounded in a misunderstanding.

On the following day Haarde said at a press conference that the Icelandic government was outraged that the UK government applied provisions of "anti-terrorism legislation" to it in a move they dubbed a "very unfriendly act". In a statement to the Althing on 15 October, Haarde again criticized the British government, saying that its actions "had nothing to do with salvaging British interests" and were "absolutely unacceptable". He also reiterated that Iceland was considering legal action against the UK.

The next day, the Central Bank of Iceland stated that problems with international payments to and from Iceland were "directly attributable to the extremely harmful actions taken by the British authorities" a claim that was repeated on 21 October. The allegations were reiterated by Davíð Oddsson, chairman of the governors of the central bank, on 18 November:

When the bulk of our banking system collapsed in the space of a few days in October and the British placed a fellow NATO member on a list together with the most notorious terrorists on the planet – a list that included not only Landsbanki but also the Republic of Iceland – it was no wonder that foreign exchange activity between Iceland and other nations should be utterly paralysed.

Haarde, before the Althing again on 30 October, criticized the UK's "absurd decision to invoke the Terrorism Act against Icelandic interests in Britain", which became "the virulent measures of the UK authorities" in front of the Federation of Icelandic Fishing Vessel Owners the following day. The President of Iceland Ólafur Ragnar Grímsson, who normally has only a figurehead role in Icelandic politics, made comments about Britain at an informal lunch with foreign diplomats on 7 November: his comments about Britain were described as "directly insulting" by a Norwegian diplomat present.

Angered by the British decision, Iceland decided to submit a formal complaint to NATO about their move, and it also provoked more than 80,000 Icelandics (equal to 25% of its entire population) to sign an online petition set up under the heading "Icelanders are not terrorists". The relationship became more tense, and Iceland made it clear that UK patrols in its airspace were not appropriate given the state of affairs and subsequently on 14 November the UK had to cancel its patrols and defense of the Icelandic airspace, which before the dispute had been scheduled to start in December 2008. Iceland has no standing army of its own, and relies on a long-term standing agreement with NATO where a group of member states have committed in turns to defend the Icelandic airspace, and the UK Royal Air Force had now cancelled this after mutual agreement with NATO (although presumably with another member state having accepted to takeover the liability).

A deviating Icelandic response, compared to the general Icelandic opinion about the Icesave dispute – as it had been reflected by the Icelandic government and media, came on 13 November from Björgólfur Guðmundsson, the former chairman and leading shareholder in Landsbanki, who in the eyes of the media now had become an unpopular figure in Iceland after his bank's collapse, but presumably had more popularity in Great Britain as the owner of West Ham United football club. On the Kastljós programme on RÚV on 13 November, he stated that Landsbanki's remaining assets according to his knowledge should be enough to cover the claims of British and Dutch Icesave depositors. He thus directly contradicted the recent statement by Geir Haarde, that the UK was insisting on "conditions that would ruin our economy".

In November, media reports indicated that the European Union and EU member states were putting pressure on Icelandic authorities to reach an agreement with Britain and the Netherlands over the Icesave dispute, and this would be a prerequisite to activation of the bailout loans Iceland had applied for, from International Monetary Fund (IMF) and other EU member countries. On 16 November 2008, a small positive step was made in the dispute, when Iceland made a press statement where they announced now to have agreed with the European Union to work actively towards negotiating a mutual agreement with United Kingdom and Netherlands, on the terms for repayment of the Icelandic minimum deposit guarantees. After this outline agreement had been made about the contours for a future agreement, the former Foreign Minister Valgerður Sverrisdóttir from the opposition Progressive Party, criticized the ruling Independence Party by stating: "I think reaching an agreement was the only way to go...[they shall be criticized] for believing that they can get away with corresponding with other nations in such a way [as they did]", while she added that Britain's behaviour could also not be excused.

== Legal arguments ==
The arguments of the British and Dutch governments are based on their interpretation of the law of the European Economic Area (EEA), and around two positions in particular:

- that the Icelandic government is obliged to guarantee at least the first €20,000 in Icesave accounts;
- that Iceland's actions surrounding the collapse of Landsbanki are discriminatory against non-Icelandic creditors.

The Icelandic government disputes these positions.

=== Deposit insurance ===
Within the EEA, the requirement for deposit insurance is regulated by European Union directive 94/19/EC, which was incorporated into EEA law by decision 18/94 of the EEA Joint Committee. Iceland transposed the directive into national law in 1999, setting up the Depositors' and Investors' Guarantee Fund (Tryggingarsjóður) funded by 1 per cent of insured deposits. At the time of Landsbanki's collapse, the Tryggingarsjóður had equity of only ISK 10.8 billion, about €68 million at the exchange rates of the time and far from sufficient to cover the Dutch and British claims.

As pointed out by the European Court of Justice in the Peter Paul and Others case, "Directive 94/19 seeks to introduce cover for depositors, wherever deposits are located in the Community, in the event of the unavailability of deposits made with a credit institution which is a member of a deposit guarantee-scheme". The directive does not specify how the Member States have to provide the cover, although most operate some sort of fund to which credit institutions contribute, as in Iceland. In principle, if the fund cannot meet depositors' claims in the event of a default by a member of the scheme, it is for the remaining credit institutions to make up the difference. Such a move was impossible in the case of the Tryggingarsjóður as the remaining Icelandic credit institutions were far too small in relation to the claims of Icesave depositors, and a fortiori because Icelandic law states that "Member Companies shall not be liable for any commitments entered into by the Fund beyond their statutory contributions to the Fund."

The Icelandic government has stated that the directive was never intended to cover the case of a systemic failure, and does not impose a sovereign guarantee on deposit insurance schemes. In a speech on 3 March 2009, the Dutch Finance Minister Wouter Bos said: "First and foremost, European countries need to take a close look at how the deposit guarantee scheme is organised. It was not designed to deal with a systemic crisis but with the collapse of a single bank."

The Icelandic government has repeatedly asked that the matter be taken to the EFTA Court, and points to Recital 24 to the directive:

Whereas this Directive may not result in the Member States' or their competent authorities' being made liable in respect of depositors if they have ensured that one or more schemes guaranteeing deposits or credit institutions themselves and ensuring the compensation or protection of depositors under the conditions prescribed in this Directive have been introduced and officially recognized;

The Member States of the European Union contest the interpretation of the Icelandic government, and consider that a sovereign "guarantee of last resort", similar to the role of central banks as lenders of last resort, is the only way of "ensuring the compensation or protection of depositors" as required by the Directive. The ruling of the European Court of Justice in Peter Paul and Others, the only case to have considered Directive 94/19/EC, begins: "If the compensation of depositors […] is ensured, …". The ECJ then went on to uphold the immunity of the German authorities from civil liability for alleged failings in banking supervision (as per Recital 24) given that the depositors had been compensated up to the minimum set by the Directive.

The Directive imposes a minimum guarantee of €20,000 per depositor; moves to increase this minimum to €50,000 or even higher had been agreed politically before the Icelandic crisis, but had not been incorporated into EU law, much less into EEA law. The Tryggingarsjóður guarantees ISK 1.7 million on the basis of a fixed euro–ISK exchange rate, equivalent to €20,887. The Netherlands and the UK have higher guarantee levels, €100,000 and £50,000 (approx. €60,000) respectively; Landsbanki was a member of the Dutch and British compensation schemes for the purposes of guaranteeing this difference in cover, an arrangement known in Britain as the "passport system", and commonly used by banks throughout the EEA (see MIFID). In addition, the UK Treasury has exceptionally guaranteed retail deposits in excess of £50,000 which were held in Icelandic-owned banks in the UK at the time of the crisis, at a cost of some £1.4 billion (€1.7bn).

Finally, the emergency powers, passed by the Althing on the night of 6 October, contain a measure (Art. 8(a)) stating in regard of the Tryggingarsjóður: "It shall always be permissible to reimburse the value of deposits, securities, or cash in Icelandic currency (ISK), even though the original transactions may have been in another currency." Fortunately for the value of the ISK, it has never been seriously suggested that the Tryggingarsjóður pay out more than ISK 600 billion to British and Dutch depositors, simply to see them try to sell those ISK on the open market.

A resolution of the Joint Parliamentary Committee of the EEA adopted unanimously on 28 October 2009, notes the "lack of clarity" of EU Directive 94/19/EC over the legal obligations of governments if national guarantee funds do not suffice to cover deposit guarantees; moreover, the resolution expresses regret that "significant pressure seems to have been employed" by the IMF on Iceland to reach an agreement with the United Kingdom and the Netherlands.

=== Non-discrimination ===
The second, if not primary claim of the British and Dutch governments is that Iceland is in breach of its obligations under Article 4 of the EEA Agreement which prohibits "any discrimination on grounds of nationality", echoing Article 7 of the Treaty of Rome. The contention is that, by guaranteeing deposits at Icelandic branches but not at overseas branches, the Icelandic government is unfairly (or "illegally") favouring Icelanders, be they individuals or corporations. Iceland roundly denies the charge of discrimination.

The jurisprudence of the European Court of Justice is summarized in the García Avello case:

It is in this regard [Articles 12 EC and 17 EC] settled case-law that the principle of non-discrimination requires that comparable situations must not be treated differently and that different situations must not be treated in the same way. Such treatment may be justified only if it is based on objective considerations independent of the nationality of the persons concerned and is proportionate to the objective being legitimately pursued.

Iceland contends that its actions are "based on objective considerations independent of the nationality of the persons concerned" (the consideration being the location of the branches of the collapsed banks) and are "proportionate to the objective being legitimately pursued" (the legitimate objective being the survival of a banking system – and hence a non-barter economy – in Iceland).

The situation is complicated by the position of so-called "wholesale" depositors. In the United Kingdom, 123 local authorities and other public bodies had a total of £920 million (€1.1bn) deposited with Icelandic banks. Even the Audit Commission, the independent body responsible for overseeing local government finances, admitted having £10 million deposited with Landsbanki and its subsidiary Heritable Bank. In the Netherlands, 22 local authorities had a total of €220 million deposited in Icelandic banks, with the province of North Holland being the most exposed.

The complication is that both the UK and the Netherlands exclude local authorities and larger private corporations from their deposit insurance schemes, as is possible (but not obligatory) under Directive 94/19/EC, on the grounds that larger organizations should have more capacity to judge (and absorb) risk than the general public. Iceland makes a much more sparing use of this provision, so its definition of a guaranteed deposit is wider:

"Deposit" […] refers to any credit balance resulting from financial deposits or transfers in normal banking transactions, which a commercial bank or savings bank is under obligation to refund under existing legal or contractual terms. However, this guarantee does not extend to bonds, bills of exchange, or other claims issued by a commercial bank or savings bank in the form of securities. Deposits, securities and cash owned by Member Companies, their parent and subsidiary companies for their own account, and deposits, securities and cash connected with convictions of money-laundering, are not covered by the guarantee […]

— Paras. 3 and 6 of Article 9, Act No 98/1999

This means that Icelandic local authorities and corporations had their deposits (not including bonds) guaranteed at 100 per cent by the Icelandic government, while British and Dutch organisations in the same situation had no cover whatsoever. The Dutch government was forced to use a royal decree to prevent North Holland from attempting to seize Landsbanki assets through the courts outside the Netherlands: speaking on 7 November, Minister of the Interior and Kingdom Relations Guusje ter Horst said "Their behaviour is hindering the difficult and complex discussions with the Icelandic government."

=== EFTA evaluation ===
In their evaluation of the ongoing IceSave dispute, the EFTA Surveillance Authority (ESA) decided on 26 May 2010, that the Icelandic government was bound to pay the (minimum) deposit guarantee to all Icesave customers. As the UK and Dutch governments had already paid savers in their countries, Iceland was therefore liable to reimburse these governments. Additionally, EFTA criticised Iceland for the difference in treatment of international and domestic accounts. Iceland was given two months to respond. After initially ignoring the ESA letter, Iceland formally responded on 2 May 2011.

== Attempts at solution ==
=== Early attempts (October – December 2008) ===
The first attempts at resolving the Icesave dispute came the very weekend after the collapse of Landsbanki, when British and Dutch officials travelled to Reykjavík to meet separately with their Icelandic counterparts, in talks which all sides described as "constructive" and "in a friendly atmosphere". An agreement with the Netherlands was announced on 11 October, while the negotiations for an agreement with UK was described as being in "significant progress". The Icelandic prime minister Geir Haarde however a few days later announced, that the agreement with the Netherlands would first need the approval of the Althing, before being declared to be a final and settled agreement.

The Dutch agreement in its first version to be presented for the Althing, would mean in case of being approved, that Netherlands would lend Iceland €1.1 billion earmarked for repayment of the estimated liabilities for the Icelandic Depositors' and Investors' Guarantee Fund (Tryggingarsjóður) to the Dutch depositors in the Icesave branch of Landsbanki. The reason behind the loan was that the liquidation of Landsbanki was expected to drag on for up till seven years, and without a loan it was highly unlikely the Tryggingarsjóður would be able to raise the necessary money within the time limits of Directive 94/19/EC, because the guarantee fund only had ISK 10bn of funds per October 2008 to meet the pile of claims for minimum deposit guarantee repayments equal to ISK 600bn. While no public comment was made concerning the content of the Icelandic discussions with the UK, it was widely assumed that the UK would offer a similar type of loan to cover the liabilities of the Tryggingarsjóður towards the British depositors in the Icesave branch of Landsbanki.

Although the delegations "agreed to work closely on the other remaining issues over the coming days", there was no public sign of movement on the issue for the next four weeks. The main reason for this was the simultaneous eruption of the 2008–11 Icelandic financial crisis, which was threatening the Icelandic state with a potential bankruptcy, due to the fact that 85% of its banking sector had turned into bankruptcy within a few weeks. Thus the government was in a critical need to apply International Monetary Fund (IMF) and other willing countries for the supply of a sovereign bailout package, which at that point of time got the highest priority first to settle. The Icelandic government decided in mid-October to apply for this combined sovereign bailout package, of which the IMF had offered to pay $2.1bn and the bilateral bailout loans being offered had a size of $3.0bn, and the negotiations to settle the terms for the bailout package lasted almost four weeks. When the time came for the bailout loan to be formally approved by the Board of the IMF, it however became clear that the Icesave dispute also first needed to be resolved, before the bailout loan could be transferred. Dutch finance minister Wouter Bos said that the Netherlands would oppose activation of the IMF loan, unless a mutual agreement first was reached over Icesave.

In addition to the offered bailout loans for the Icelandic state, there was also at that point of time three special loans from Germany + UK + Netherlands, being offered to Iceland and earmarked for the repayment of minimum deposit guarantees to those account-holders having lost their private savings because of the systemic bankruptcy of Icelands three leading banks. It was rumoured that Iceland would refuse the loan offered by the UK and Netherlands, as those two loans were only earmarked for the repayment of minimum deposit guarantees to the Icesave bank, which was a foreign branch of the now bankrupt Landsbanki, and thus Iceland felt it was not the Icelandic states responsibility to guarantee/pay for the payment of such minimum deposit guarantees to the British and Dutch savers, and apparently instead preferred to leave them unpaid while referring them to legal proceedings over the alleged failure of British and Dutch watchdogs for the financial services sector.

In regards of the responsible authority for the monitoring and control of financial activities performed by the Icesave bank, it was however later established this had always been the sole responsibility of the Icelandic Financial Supervisory Authority (FME) with the minimum deposit guarantees also to be covered by the Icelandic Depositors' and Investors' Guarantee Fund, because the Icesave bank had been established as a foreign branch by the Icelandic Landsbanki. The foreign authorities would only have had the responsibility to monitor and control the Icesave bank, if it had been established as an independent UK/Dutch subsidiary being fully owned by Landsbanki. Thus it was only the Icelandic authorities having a legal responsibility in the case, and this fact alone emphasized the need for a solution about the payment of minimum deposit guarantees to the Dutch and British Icesave account holders, either to be reached with the Icelandic state or the Icelandic Depositors' and Investors' Guarantee Fund.

At a press conference on 12 November, the President of the European Commission José Manuel Durão Barroso said that Iceland would have to reach an agreement to resolve the Icesave dispute before it could expect any help from the European Union. Icelandic foreign minister Ingibjörg Sólrún Gísladóttir commented "We are isolated when all 27 EU member states agree that we have to reach an accord on Icesave." Talks began almost immediately in Brussels with the mediation of France, which held the rotating Presidency of the European Council. An outline agreement was reached on 16 November, with the Icelandic government accepting to guarantee the liabilities of the Tryggingarsjóður. In the event of bankruptcy of any Icelandic bank, the Icelandic guarantee scheme was responsible to repay the first €20,887 of savings held by private foreign individuals, with the foreign guarantee scheme's in other nations responsible to pay the remaining guarantee according to their rules; meaning that the Dutch and British state would pay for the remaining amount up to its guarantee of respectively a maximum of €100,000 in Netherlands and £50,000 (approx. €60,000) in UK.

On 18 November, once the IMF Board had approved its emergency loan, the UK and Netherlands agreed in addition to lend Iceland respectively £2.2 billion (€2.6bn) and €1.3 billion, earmarked for the coverage of Icelandic minimum deposit guarantees for the UK and Dutch Icesave retail depositors. Likewise, Germany also agreed to lend Iceland €1.1 billion, earmarked for the coverage of Icelandic minimum deposit guarantees for the German Kaupthing Edge retail depositors. The repayment conditions were however still subject of further negotiation with EU involvement. The Dutch government confirmed on 20 November that its loan to Iceland had been finalised. The settlement of the €5bn earmarked minimum deposit guarantee loans, at the same time paved the way not only for the US$2.1bn IMF bailout loan, but also for a transfer of some bilateral bailout loans for the Icelandic state, with $2.5bn being transferred by Denmark + Sweden + Norway + Finland, $0.2bn from Poland, $0.05bn from Faroes Island.

On 10 December, De Nederlandse Bank (DNB, the Dutch central bank) started to refund the deposited amounts to depositors up to a maximum amount of €100,000 per person. For this operation, DNB hired sixty temporary employees who were housed on the second floor of the Bank's headquarters. With around 120,000 paper files being handled on this floor, lying around in crates, DNB realised the floor was not capable of holding this amount of weight and the entire department had to be moved. The repayment liability for the Dutch state – according to the Dutch minimum deposit guarantee scheme – equalled €1.6bn out of a total of €1.67bn being lost by Dutch retail customers (of which €1.33bn equalled the Icelandic minimum deposit guarantee liabilities, ultimately to be covered by either Tryggingarsjóður or the Icelandic state). The repayment liability for the British state – according to the British minimum deposit guarantee scheme – equalled £3.5bn out of a total of £4.53bn being lost by British retail customers (of which £2.2bn equalled the Icelandic minimum deposit guarantee liabilities, ultimately to be covered by either Tryggingarsjóður or the Icelandic state).

=== Icesave bill 1 (June – September 2009) ===
A final repayment agreement was reached between UK, Netherlands and Icelandic negotiators, and a bill formally entitled Act 96/2009 was presented to the Icelandic parliament in June 2009. However, the Althing debate revealed wide opposition -even within the government- about the repayment conditions, and thus the parliament unilaterally added an amendment to the bill which set a maximum ceiling on the yearly repayments based on the country's Gross Domestic Product. On 28 August 2009, Iceland's parliament voted 34–15 (with 14 abstentions) to approve this amended bill (commonly referred to as the Icesave bill 1), which covered the conditions for the repayment to Great Britain and Netherlands of the €3.8bn minimum deposit guarantees stemming from the losses on the foreign Icesave deposit accounts. The repayment basically functioned as a states guaranteed repayment of the €3.8bn to UK and Netherlands, previously being owed to them by the – at that point of time money drained – Icelandic Depositors' and Investors' Guarantee Fund (Tryggingarsjóður).

At the parliamentary vote, the 15 opponents of the bill had argued that no clear legal obligation existed for the Icelandic state to pay/guarantee for those lost deposits that Tryggingarsjóður potentially could not afford to cover by itself. The government however argued, that if the parliament failed to pass the bill, then Britain and the Netherlands might retaliate by blocking a planned aid package for Iceland from the International Monetary Fund (IMF). After unilaterally having amended the bill with a special ceiling for the state's guaranteed repayment, which greatly reduced the risk and liabilities for the Icelandic state, the two government parties voted through the bill in the parliament. President Ólafur Ragnar Grímsson signed and enacted the bill on 2 September 2009.

The introduced repayment ceiling under the amended bill was rather complicated. It was supposed to work in this way, that starting from 2008 the yearly increase of Icelandic GDP growth measured in pound sterling and euro (according to Eurostats method) should be calculated, with these figures being accumulated from year to year. Then the yearly repayments should be conducted in 2017–23 to the degree of what an IMF evaluation had found was within sustainable limits, but in all circumstances still also within a maximum amount for UK equal to 4% of the accumulated basis increase of the Icelandic GDP since 2008. For UK the same repayment rules would apply for 2016–24, but with the maximum rate being lowered to 2%. An identical repayment ceiling was introduced for the repayments to Netherlands, with the only exception that the maximum rate in this case was 2% in 2017–23 and 1% in 2016–24. Remaining debts after 2024 would be cancelled. During the parliamentary debates, an assessment note for the amended bill had been delivered by the Icelandic Central Bank, concluding that when the Landsbanki receivership had finished its liquidation of all positive financial assets from the bankrupted Old Landsbanki by the end of 2015, then it was very likely Tryggingarsjóður through this liquidation would have received an amount big enough to repay the Dutch and British state 75% (+/- 15%) of the owed €3.8bn minimum deposit guarantees; meaning the size of the repayment liabilities for the Icelandic State was likely in all circumstances to be limited, as it would only takeover the remaining part of this unpaid liability (incl. accrued interest) in 2016–24.

As the altered bill, no longer guaranteed a 100% repayment of the €3.8bn owed for the minimum deposit guarantees, the Dutch and UK governments however opted not to accept the enacted Icesave bill 1, and continued to block the payment of the second tranche of the IMF loans, and argued they would continue to do so until the Icelandic state were willing to pass a repayment agreement that would guarantee a full repayment of the entire amount of their owings (although they were ready to renegotiate the terms).

=== Icesave bill 2 (December 2009 – March 2010) ===
In December 2009, the Althing, voting almost strictly by party lines (with two defections from the governing parties to the opposition), narrowly (33-30) passed a new version of the Icesave bill – formally entitled Act 1/2010 – being an amendment of the former Act 96/2009, to agree with British and Dutch demands in the Icesave dispute. The bill would make it possible for Britain and the Netherlands to recoup the €4bn of minimum deposit guarantees, which they had paid on behalf of the money drained Icelandic minimum deposit guarantee fund to the British and UK Icesave customers – who had lost all their savings with the bankruptcy of Landsbanki in October 2008. The two governments would receive payments over the next 14 years after compensating the losses of more than 320,000 of the bank's customers. In the UK, deposits of up to £50,000 per account holder had been guaranteed by the British government under the Financial Services Compensation Scheme. The British and Dutch governments had in fact at this point of time already repaid in full, all the lost €6.7bn of deposits belonging to UK and Dutch retail customers, which was beyond the liability stipulated by their minimum deposit guarantee schemes, and now with Icesave bill 2 only requested the Icelandic state to guarantee, that the British and Dutch government over a 15-year period at least would receive a repayment equal to the applying Icelandic minimum deposit guarantees, which totaled €4bn.

A few days after Icesave bill 2 had been passed by the Althing, a highly respected judge of the Icelandic supreme court, Ragnar Hall, went public with a strong criticism on the repayment agreement, as it had been outlined with the same legal design flaw both in Icesave bill 1 and Icesave bill 2, and thus he recommended the president not to enact the passed bill – and if a referendum subsequently was called on the issue – he also recommended the Icelandic electorate to turn it down. The legal design flaw he had pointed out, was that the repayment agreement had a paragraph which had interfered and changed the usual creditor priority order, compared to how it normally worked according to the Icelandic law. He stated to have repeatedly pointed this important detail out to the Icelandic negotiatiers already in June 2009, then again in his article published 22 July 2009, and on several other occasions; but now he could see the issue unfortunately – and somewhat surprisingly – had not been fixed in either Icesave bill 1 nor in Icesave bill 2.

According to Ragnar Hall, any enactment of the current version of Icesave bill 2, would mean that the highest creditor priority would no longer be held solely by the Icelandic Depositors' and Investors' Guarantee Fund, as would have been the case if only the standard Icelandic receivership/bankruptcy law had applied, but instead the Icesave bills had now relegated its priority order to be equal with all other "priority claims" towards the receivership. By side-ordering all creditor priority claims, which primarily was related to the extra claims from UK and Netherlands also to seek coverage for their extended repayment of deposits to UK and Dutch savers (from the receivership and not from the Icelandic state), in reality meant that after liquidation of all positive remaining Landsbanki assets, then this recovery would no longer first be used 100% to repay all of the €4bn big minimum deposit guarantees to the Icelandic state, but due to the side-ordering of creditor priorities the Icelandic state would straight from the start only be repaid by the receivership by a 51% share of the money being recovered. If the receivership managed to recover enough money to cover all priority claims, the Icelandic State's loss of first priority status within the priority claims would not cause any difference. In the event the receivership only managed to recover 50% of all priority claims, there would however be a huge difference, as a first priority status then would ensure 100% coverage of the €4bn liabilities, while enactment of the Icesave bill agreements on the contrary would mean that the Icelandic state instead only would receive half of its €4bn claims towards the receivership, leaving the Icelandic state and tax payers responsible to pay for the remaining claims not being met.

The news about the included design flaw in the Icesave bills related to the unfavourable side-ordering of all the creditors "priority claims", and hence if this bill was enacted a significant increase of liabilities for the Icelandic state compared to status quo, ignited a wide dissatisfaction in the Icelandic electorate, and the president was petitioned by some 56,000 people, or approximately 23% of Iceland's voters, not to enact the bill and instead put the issue before a referendum. On 5 January 2010, Icelandic President Ólafur Ragnar Grímsson declared that he would not sign the bill and called for a referendum. Opinion polls predicted that a sizable majority of Icelanders would vote against the bill in a referendum.

On the day that President Grímsson announced that he would not sign the new Icesave law, the UK Financial Services Secretary Lord Myners responded saying that "The Icelandic people, if they took that decision [not to accept the bill], would effectively be saying that Iceland doesn't want to be part of the international financial system," while Dutch finance minister Wouter Bos called such a decision "unacceptable" and stated that whatever the outcome of the Icelandic referendum, Iceland would still be "compelled to pay back the money". Iceland's prime minister, Jóhanna Sigurðardóttir, ensured towards the international community that her government was still committed to campaign for electoral approval of the Dutch and UK loan guarantee agreements, because these agreements were considered to pave the way for enactment of a comprehensive IMF bailout package to Iceland, and thus viewed as being integral to the country's economic revival.

On 5 January 2010, the credit rating agency Fitch Group stated that the call for an Icesave election by the Icelandic president, had created "a new wave of political, economic and financial uncertainty", and characterized his decision as a "step back in the attempts to re-establish normal financial relations with the rest of the world", that now caused a further downgrade of Iceland's credit rating from BBB− to BB+. The downgrade of its rating to BB+, meant Iceland became categorized as a non-investment-grade country (also known as junk status), which by effect made it impossible for Iceland to continue borrow money from the free capital markets, and thus became dependent on receiving external bailout loans to meet its short term financial needs. Mark Flanagan, head of an IMF mission to Reykjavik, made this comment 10 January 2010, about Iceland's immediate need to receive cash through an IMF bailout loan: "The fund [IMF] has never had a formal condition on Icesave completion. Never. How Icesave affected the timing of the review was indirect and related to the broader financing for the programme. Because other creditors of Iceland made it a condition, we had to wait until they were satisfied. The dispute between Iceland, Britain and the Netherlands concerning Icesave complicated efforts by Iceland to secure additional external financing for the programme from other participating countries. Would non-passage of "Icesave bill 2" affect financing assurances? I don't know how these things will play out. I'm not willing to speculate."

==== Negotiations to improve "Icesave bill 2" ====
Due to the recently discovered design flaws in the Icesave bill 2 agreement, which had put an equal stand to the priority of all the creditor's "priority claims" towards the Landsbanki receivership, meaning that the Icelandic state as an unwanted consequence suddenly faced much higher liabilities compared to how the Icelandic law normally would regulate the matter, it was now a fact in February 2010 that basically all Icelandic politicians had started to recommend the Icelandic people to vote no for the Icesave bill 2 in the referendum being scheduled to take place on 6 March 2010. On this background, it was decided by the Icelandic politicians instead to start a new round of negotiations to attempt fixing the issue and reach a new better compromise in the Icesave dispute. An Icelandic delegation was sent to London with a proposal for a new repayment agreement to remove the unwanted negative effects for the Icelandic state, while solving the dispute by still accepting the Icelandic state make a guarantee for a full repayment of the €4bn big loan to cover the minimum deposit guarantee obligation. This new Icelandic offer, was described as focusing to maximize the amount of Landsbanki assets received by the UK and the Netherlands, by secreting and transferring asset values (equal to their claims without accrued interests) from the Landsbanki receivership over to a public owned liquidation unit in the two countries.

The UK and the Netherlands, however, did not accept this new Icelandic proposal. After rejecting the Icelandic proposal, UK and the Netherlands, instead presented a counter proposal in which they offered variable interest rates, which were significantly lower than the previously agreed upon 5.5%, and moreover accepted to waive the accrued interests for 2009–10. This offer was estimated to save the Icelandic government €450 million compared to the previous agreements, an offer which according to the Dutch Minister of finance Wouter Bos would be the Dutch final offer. Public statements were not available to reveal whether or not the counter proposal from UK and Netherlands, had managed to remove the unwanted effect of having side-ordered all the creditor claims towards the Landsbanki receivership.

Iceland rejected the offer by the UK and the Netherlands, but did present yet a new proposal to the UK and the Netherlands. Iceland's finance minister Steingrímur J. Sigfússon described the new Icelandic offer as a "significant step towards them [UK and Netherlands]". The UK and Dutch government officials refused to discuss this new offer by Iceland. Talks continued until 5 March 2010. As no agreement was reached by the end of this day, the original Icesave bill 2 agreement was put to a referendum on 6 March 2010.

==== Referendum on "Icesave bill 2" ====
After the Icelandic president had refused to sign and enact the Icesave bill 2 on 5 January 2010, it was clear that a referendum on the bill was now needed. The referendum was the first to be held in Iceland since its independence referendum in 1944, and required special legislation. The Althing (Iceland's parliament) approved a motion on 8 January 2010, which called for the referendum to be held by 6 March at the latest. The motion passed by 49–0 with 14 abstentions, and a few days later the referendum was scheduled to be held on 6 March 2010.

The referendum was held to approve the terms of a state guarantee on the debts of the Depositors' and Investors' Guarantee Fund (Tryggingarsjóður innstæðueigenda og fjárfesta), in particular a €4 billion loan from the governments of the United Kingdom and the Netherlands to cover deposit insurance obligations in those countries. The referendum was held under article 26 of the Constitution of Iceland after President Ólafur Ragnar Grímsson refused to counter-sign the corresponding Act of Parliament (known as Icesave bill 2) into law on 5 January 2010.

On the election day basically all Icelandic politicians recommended the electorate to vote no to Icesave bill 2, due to a design flaw in the bill, which accidentally had converted the by Icelandic law defined first priority creditor claim for repayment of the Icelandic minimum deposit guarantees from the Landsbanki receivership, into a side-ordered lower priority together with the other priority claims. Ahead of the election, a calculation program had been published to display how the following five deciding parameters would influence the repayment conditions for the Icelandic state in the Icesave dispute (which showed how big an impact the newly introduced side-ordering of priority claims caused on the subsequent repayment liabilities for the Icelandic State):

- Total value collected by the Landsbanki receivership from liquidation of assets (depending on its success rate, and that valuation of assets can change in the years ahead).
- All the creditor's "priority claims" can either be side-ordered (as in Icesave bill 2), or obey to Icelandic law (with an exclusive first priority for repayment of the Icelandic minimum deposit guarantees).
- A variable interest rate shall (in Icesave bill 2) be paid on remaining debt repayments in 2009–24 (it was 5.55% in January 2010, but can change in the future).
- Currency exchange rate between Icelandic króna (ISK) and Pound sterling (GBP), used for repayment to UK of the £2.35bn loan.
- Currency exchange rate between Icelandic króna (ISK) and euro (EUR), used for repayment to Netherlands of the €1.33bn loan.

When the votes had been counted, the result of the referendum was a resoundingly defeat for the proposed Icesave bill 2, with 93% voting against and less than 2% in favor.

=== Referendum on "Icesave bill 3" (February – April 2011) ===
After the referendum, a negotiating committee was formed under the chairmanship of Lee Buchheit, and new negotiations commenced. On 16 February 2011, the Icelandic parliament agreed to a repayment deal with the votes 44 for and 16 against, formally entitled Act 13/2011 but more commonly referred to as the Icesave bill 3. The third version of the Icesave bill entailed new terms and conditions for repayment of the full and remaining Icesave debt to UK and Netherlands, throughout a period stretching from one to 30 years starting from 2016 (with the length depending on how much time Iceland would need to repay its remaining obligations), to the sound of a fixed constant interest rate at 3.2% for 2009–15, which then ultimately would be substituted by a variable interest rate for the years beyond. Another improvement compared to the previous Icesave bills, was that it included an interest rate moratorium (rate being fixed to 0%) for the first three quarters of 2009. The yearly repayment amount would also be capped at the lowest of these two ceilings: Maximum 1.3% of Icelands GDP (i.e. €0.13bn in 2011), or maximum 5% of the total Icelandic government revenue from the previous year (i.e. €0.23bn in 2011). A minimum repayment was however also guaranteed by the mutual agreement, as it could never be less compared to a situation with traditional amortisation over 30 years. Finally the new deal also in practise had removed the demand for equal footing for all "priority claims" towards the Landsbanki receivership, meaning that it was now likely the receivership would repay 100% of the €4bn of owed minimum deposit guarantees during 2011–15, with the accrued interests being the only remaining responsibility for the Icelandic state subsequently to guarantee and cover. It was noted in the bill, that the expected remaining liabilities for the Icelandic state would now only amount to ISK 47bn (€0.24bn) in 2016, meaning it was now likely for the Icelandic state to repay all the remaining liabilities after only two years of amortisation in 2016 and 2017. The Icelandic president however once again refused to sign the new deal on 20 February 2011, and thus triggered a new Icesave referendum to be called. A referendum was held on 9 April 2011, asking the Icelandic electorate to vote yes/no for Icesave bill 3. A group of 15 concerned citizens organised under the name of Advice.is and campaigned for a No in Iceland and internationally.

One month ahead of the vote, the Landsbanki receivership (LBI) published a quarterly financial status, where its total recovery of assets was estimated to equal roughly 96% (ISK 1263bn/1319bn) of all priority claims towards the receivership, which implied a full repayment of all minimum deposit guarantees already by the end of 2013, due to their first priority status within the "priority claims". Assuming this estimate was correct, then the Icelandic state with Icesave bill 3 would only be liable in 2016 to conduct repayments to the British and Dutch states, for the accrued 3.2% interests related to the delayed repayment of minimum deposit guarantees in 2009-13.

After preliminary results suggested that the improved deal had been rejected by the referendum, with 58% of voters voting against it and 42% voting in favor, both the Icelandic and the British government expressed their disappointment at the preliminary result. Iceland's prime minister Jóhanna Sigurðardóttir stated that "the worst option had been chosen"; UK treasury minister Danny Alexander described the decision as "obviously disappointing", and further said that "we tried to get a negotiated settlement. We have an obligation to get that money back, and we will continue to pursue that until we do... We have a difficult financial position as a country and this money would help".

Alexander further stated that the matter would be referred to an international court, the EFTA Court. Dutch minister of finance Jan Kees de Jager announced legal actions against Iceland, stating that the time to negotiate had come to an end, while Iceland is still obligated to refund the Netherlands. Icelandic finance minister Steingrímur J. Sigfússon ruled out a third referendum, saying that "I think we're getting a very clear sign from this referendum, that further negotiations are ruled out. No use in trying that again".

The final result of the referendum was announced on 11 April 2011; 39.7% of voters voted in favor of the agreement (69,462 votes) and 58.9% voted against it (103,207 votes), with the remaining 1.4% of the ballots being invalid. The voter turnout was 77.2%.

== EFTA Court clears Iceland of all charges ==
After the results of the 2011 referendum became known, The EFTA Surveillance Authority released the following statement:

The Authority has taken note of the outcome of the Icelandic referendum concerning the Icesave issue. We now expect a swift answer from the Icelandic government to our Letter of Formal Notice of May last year. We will assess the government's reply before we take further steps in the case. Unless the letter from the government contains arguments that alter our preliminary conclusions in the case, the next formal step would be to send Iceland a final warning, a Reasoned Opinion. This final warning will give Iceland two months to rectify their breach of the EEA Agreement. If Iceland continues to be in breach of the agreement, the case will be sent to the EFTA Court.

— EFTA Surveillance Authority

On 2 May 2011, the Icelandic Ministry of Economic Affairs published a response to the EFTA Surveillance Authority's letter of 20 May 2010, maintaining that Iceland "did not fail to comply with its obligations under Directive 94/19/EC." On 10 June 2011, the EFTA Surveillance Authority ruled that Iceland should take steps towards paying the full amount to the UK and the Netherlands within three months after the ruling. The Icelandic Minister of Economic Affairs Árni Páll Árnason made a statement to the Icelandic Parliament on the same day rejecting this ruling.

On 14 December 2011, the EFTA Surveillance Authority lodged a formal application with the EFTA Court. The EFTA Court opened the Case E-16/11 – EFTA Surveillance Authority v Iceland on 15 December 2011. Defence by the Government of Iceland was received by the Court on 8 March 2012 and a reply from the EFTA Surveillance Authority was received on 11 April 2012. The Governments of United Kingdom, Netherlands, Liechtenstein and Norway, as well as the European Commission have also filed written observations.

The Oral Hearing in the case took place on 18 September 2012. The judgment was delivered on 28 January 2013 and Iceland was cleared of all claims in the case. The decision of the Court was widely reported in the international media. The Financial Times addressed the Court's ruling in an editorial calling it "a victory for law and economic sense."

== Landsbanki liquidation and repayment of claims ==
On 28 January 2013, the EFTA Court cleared Iceland of all charges, meaning that no loan agreement will be settled between the Icelandic state and the UK and the Netherlands, to guarantee their claim for repayment of Icelandic minimum deposit guarantees worth €4.0bn (ISK 674bn) plus accrued interests. This claim will however still exist towards the Landsbanki receivership as a so-called "First priority claim", and will be met in full if the receivership succeeds to liquidate assets with a value equal to or in excess of this first priority liability.

The combined deposit repayment claims from retail Icesave customers in Netherlands and Great Britain (including both the minimum depositor guarantees, and the deposit values in excess of the Icelandic guarantee), were at first hand covered respectively by the UK Financial Services Compensation Scheme (FSCS) and by De Nederlandsche Bank (DNB), due to the inability/unwillingness for other Icelandic stakeholders to step in and ensure/guarantee immediate coverage for these claims. On 28 October 2011, the Supreme Court of Iceland ruled, that the UK FSCS and the Dutch DNB combined deposit repayments of respectively ISK 852.1bn (£4.459bn) and ISK 282.3bn (€1.668bn) should be repaid by the Landsbanki receivership as "priority claims" pursuant to Article 112 of "Act No.21/1991 on Bankruptcy", and noted these mentioned figures included contractual interest rates for the UK part and some extra penalty interest rates (6%) for the Dutch part for the period from 8 October 2008 until 22 April 2009. Together these two claims amounts to ISK 1134.4bn (€6.704bn), which is equal to 86% of all "priority claims" towards the Landsbanki receivership. Among the other priority claims are also ISK 145.4bn deposit repayment claims (equal to 11% of all "priority claims"), submitted directly by more than 200 wholesale Icesave customers in Netherlands and Great Britain, who initially received no repayment from their national authorities, but will now get a repayment on equal terms – with equal priority status – from the Landsbanki receivership.

As of 30 June 2013, the total value of the assets in the Landsbanki receivership (including the already repaid part of the claims) covered ISK 1531bn (€9.1bn), which was above the total amount of the priority claims at ISK 1325bn (€7.8bn). The final overall value for the assets is however still subject to change, as the receivership for various reasons has been granted extra time to liquidate all remaining assets until 2018, at a pace equal to approximately ISK 100bn per year. Repayment to the creditors happen step by step at the same pace as liquidation of assets happen. The repayments so far happened through four tranches in 2011–13, which already included a full repayment of all minimum deposit guarantees, due to their first priority status within the "priority claims". As of 12 September 2013, the Landsbanki receivership had through liquidation of the first half of its assets, managed to repay the first 53.9% (ISK 715.2bn) of all the priority claims.

According to the latest evaluation of the planned recovery of asset values, it is expected all "Priority claims" will have been fully repaid by the end of 2017. Any additional claims for accrued interests after 22 April 2009 due to the delayed repayment of priority claims, will only be treated as secondary "general claims", and thus only be repaid once all of the "Priority claims" have been repaid in full, and then only to the extent it is possible on an equal footing together with all the other remaining ISK 1677bn (€9.9bn) of "General claims" towards the Landsbanki receivership.

Status for claims towards the Landsbanki receivership as of 30 June 2013
Claim type	Amount (bn ISK)	Accepted	Settled^{1} (bn ISK)	Repaid (bn ISK)	Remaining liability (bn ISK)
Proprietary interest	4.9	100%	4.9	0	0
Administrative expense	8.5	100%	6.1	2.4	0
Guarantee claims	58.0	100%	58.0	0	0
Priority claims	1325.4	99.1%	0	647.6	677.9
General claims	1677.4	61.5%	0	0	1677.4
Total claims	3074.2	78.6%	69.0	650.0	2354.2

Note: ^{1} Liability was not repaid by cash from liquidated assets, but got settled by other means.

According to the Landsbanki receivership's initial interpretation of the Icelandic law, the creditor claims in foreign currency towards a liquidated Icelandic financial company in receivership, should only be repaid by an ISK-equivalent amount as per the currency exchange rate registered on the date when winding-up proceedings were initiated; which was as per 22 April 2009 for the Landsbanki receivership. Moreover, it was believed the creditors had no legal right to claim compensation towards the Landsbanki receivership for any potential losses they may suffer, because of exchange rate fluctuations after 22 April 2009. On 26 September 2013, the Icelandic Supreme Court however ruled against this initial law interpretation of the Landsbanki receivership, concluding all creditors should be fully repaid with currency amounts equal to the denoted local currency of their claim; meaning that when repaid with other currencies, then valuation of this amount should be calculated by converting it to the claim's denoted currency, according to the foreign currency exchange rates registered by the Icelandic Central Bank on the repayment date. Thus ensuring that all creditors bare no currency exchange risks, with these risks – and potential financial burdens – instead to be upheld solely by the receivership.

As the receivership mainly holds bank assets valuated in foreign currencies, the repayment of claims is likewise expected to be conducted through partial repayments mainly in foreign currencies, equal to the available cash currency basket stemming from liquidated assets on the payment day. Because of the currency mix being more or less equal when comparing the claims with the held assets, the risk for currency exchange losses are expected to be relatively low for the receivership. The table below provides an overview of the currency composition of the first three partial repayments and how currency exchange rates were at the time compared to 22 April 2009.

Creditor repayment tranches for those who hold "priority claims", and ISK currency exchange rates	22 April 2009 (Winding-up proceedings)	2 December 2011 (1st repayment)		24 May 2012 (2nd repayment)		5 October 2012 (3rd repayment)		Total (bn)
Creditor repayment tranches for those who hold "priority claims", and ISK currency exchange rates	Fixed currency rates (ISK value of one currency unit)	Rate	Amount (bn)	Rate	Amount (bn)	Rate	Amount (bn)	Total (bn)
Canadian dollar (CAD)	105.5	120.1 (+13.8%)	0 (~ISK 0)	128.1 (+21.4%)	0 (~ISK 0)	126.9 (+20.3%)	0 (~ISK 0)	0 (~ISK 0)
European euro (EUR)	169.2	164.5 (-2.8%)	1.1 (~ISK 178)	164.9 (-2.5%)	0 (~ISK 0)	161.8 (-4.4%)	0.17 (~ISK 27)	1.27 (~ISK 205)
Icelandic kronur (ISK)	1	1 (0.0%)	10 (~ISK 10)	1 (0.0%)	0 (~ISK 0)	1 (0.0%)	0 (~ISK 0)	10 (~ISK 10)
Great Britain pounds (GBP)	191.1	191.3 (+0.1%)	0.74 (~ISK 138)	205.9 (+7.7%)	0.85 (~ISK 172)	201.4 (+5.4%)	0.15 (~ISK 30)	1.74 (~ISK 340)
US dollar (USD)	130.7	121.8 (-6.8%)	0.71 (~ISK 84)	131.3 (+0.5%)	0 (~ISK 0)	124.4 (-4.8%)	0.19 (~ISK 23)	0.90 (~ISK 107)
Total repayment value in ISK (bn)^{a}	-	-	410	-	172	-	80	648^{b}

Note:
^{a}Calculated as ISK-equivalent repayment value for the receivership by the entity of the FX 22 April 2009 valued claims, while adjusting for currency exchange rate fluctuations happening on each payment date. In example for the second repayment tranch, all creditors with claims in pounds received 1:1 repayment with cash in pounds; meaning that the repayment to these creditors had an ISK-equivalent account value then being 1:1 proportional with the ISK/Pound-rate on 22 April 2009. Contrary to this, the creditors with claims in euros/US dollars also received cash in pounds – but now at a time when these currencies had lost value against pounds – and thus the ISK-equivalent account value then was stronger with the same percentage compared to what the currencies had weakened against the pound; meaning that the repayment to these creditors had an ISK-equivalent account-value then with a relatively higher value for the receivership than 1:1, because of repaying US dollar and euro claims with a relatively stronger Pound currency compared to 22 April 2009 registered exchange rates. Or to put in different words, the receivership by conducting the second repayment three years later than 22 April 2009 actually gained some extra positive income through exchange rate improvements for the specific cash currency (pound) involved in this repayment tranch. The applied method to calculate ISK-equivalent account values for the repayments, is in full compliance with the supreme court ruling, saying that all creditors shall be repaid by cash amounts equal to their claim as per its denoted currency; so when repaid with other currencies, then the value of this shall be booked according to the currency exchange rate between the involved currencies registered at the repayment date.
^{b} ISK 14bn were returned in 2012 to the receivership from ESCROW-accounts, as some of the remaining disputed claims got settled by the court in its favour. Thus the net total got reduced from ISK 662bn to 648bn.

As of 12 September 2013, the Landsbanki receivership had, through liquidation of the first half of its assets, managed to repay the first 53.9% (ISK 715bn, €4.23bn) of all the priority claims, and expected the remaining part would be fully repaid by the end of 2017. The claims for accrued interests after 22 April 2009, related to the delayed repayment of priority claims, will however only be treated as secondary general claims; and the estimated value of the receivership's liquidated assets will not be sufficient to meet these additional claims in full.

=== How capital controls impact creditor repayment ===
Iceland elected a new government in April 2013, which as one of their top priorities wanted to negotiate a debt haircut towards foreign creditors of the three failed Icelandic banks now in receivership, as part of a deal to lift the long enforced (since November 2008) capital controls. As the current capital controls only ban a swap/exchange of ISK denominated assets to foreign currency, and as 97% of the Landsbanki receivership total assets are held only in foreign currency, this new Icelandic initiative will however most likely not affect the repayment scheme for the priority claim creditors in the Landsbanki receivership – who at the moment are forecasted to be fully repaid by the first 91.2% of the receivership assets. So even if the current capital controls remain in force at an indefinite time horizon, it will only be the last 3.2% of the assets (ISK 49/1531bn) which remain to be frozen or trapped in Iceland and can not be directly repaid, which then only would negatively impact the return rate for the creditors with general claims.

The only minor risk for the receivership's "priority claim creditors" seems to be, that the receivership might face political demands to extend the maturity of its owned Glacier bonds towards the New Landsbanki, as part of the Icelandic government's overall capital control abolition initiative, which would then delay liquidation of this specific asset. The nicknamed Glacier bonds, concern two bonds with a total value of ISK 297bn (€1.76bn), that currently are due for yearly repayments in foreign currency from New Landsbanki to the Landsbanki receivership, during the period 2014–18. These specific repayment transfers are by some people speculated to be impossible, if the capital controls gets abolished, as such abolishment would be expected to drain the foreign capital reserves held by New Landsbanki; and thus a deal to remove capital controls is speculated will also need to imply a prolonged maturity (or repayment agreement) for these bonds.

The Icelandic government intent somehow to route the saved money from the negotiated debt haircut for creditors belonging to the receivership estates of Kaupthing and Glitnir, into a national household debt relief fund, enabling a 20% debt relief for all household mortgages. Experts from IMF however believe, that any potentially saved money from a negotiated deal, would be eaten up by the additional costs the government will need to pay in the short term, for implementing the abolishment of capital controls. In July 2013, Standard & Poors recommended Iceland to drop the debt relief initiative, as they also believe it would only result in increased debt for the government – making it even more difficult to lend at credit markets, and the debt relief initiative was forecasted also to ignite high inflation pressures along with risk for arrival of a new economic recession equal to a GDP detraction of 10%.

The Icelandic government appointed a taskforce to present proposals on how to achieve the government's goals, which on 30 November 2013, proposed the Icelandic parliament to launch a debt relief plan from 2014–17, being completely independent of the idea to lift capital controls and the idea of a potential debt haircut towards foreign creditors of the receivership estates of Kaupthing and Glitnir. The debt relief is now instead proposed to be financed by ISK 80bn from a bank tax towards both the three defunct receivership banks and all currently operating banks in Iceland, and by ISK 70bn stemming from pension tax paid to the Icelandic state in advance – ahead of the time when pension savers retire and normally pay the tax as a levy. The plan someday to lift the capital controls still exist, but is now envisaged as something that will not happen before 2015 at the earliest.

=== New creditor repayment restrictions ===
On 12 March 2012, the Icelandic government amended – by Act No 17/2012 – the existing Act No 87/1992 on Foreign Exchange, so that its paragraph five of Article 13n now represents new currency restrictions for repayment of foreign currency to creditors in any receivership estates. In that regard, it shall be noted that all of the first four repayment tranches repaid by the Landsbanki receivership were exempted from this amended law, because it only involved available cash stemming from liquidation conducted ahead of 12 March 2012. All future repayment tranches will however be impacted by the amended law, which stipulates that the Icelandic minister of finance and minister of banking have to agree on exemptions granted by the Icelandic Central Bank for all future claim repayments stemming from companies with a larger balance sheet than ISK 400bn, even if it only involves a transfer of foreign currency. This mean, that the Icelandic state now potentially also can block for any further repayment of foreign currency to the creditors of the Landsbanki receivership. No court has yet judged, if this extended power of the Icelandic State, also to decide the pace of foreign currency repayments and not only ISK currency repayments, is legal or illegal.

Another new repayment restriction under consideration, is that the Icelandic government on 1 October 2013 presented a proposal for their 2014 budget law, to include a new 0.145% tax on all transfers from estates of failed financial companies. Some lawyers however have the opinion, that this kind of tax on failed companies could be seen as an illegal expropriation by the Icelandic state. If the Icelandic government passes this proposed law, it will almost with certainty become challenged in a lawsuit by the receivership estates behind the three failed Icelandic banks. The Kaupthing estate has released a statement pointing out they consider the proposal to be illegal, due to both infringement of private property (expropriation) and because its illegal retroactively to introduce a new tax claim with a higher creditor priority than the already filed claims towards the estates in winding-up proceedings.

== See also ==
- Landsbanki
- Glitnir (bank)
- Kaupthing Bank
- Landsbanki Freezing Order 2008
- 2010 Icelandic loan guarantees referendum
- 2011 Icelandic loan guarantees referendum
- 2008–11 Icelandic financial crisis
- EFTA Surveillance Authority v Iceland
