= Paul v Germany =

- European Court of Justice

Submitted June 17 2002 Decided October 12 2004
- Full case name: Peter Paul, Cornelia Sonnen-Lütte and Christel Mörkens v Bundesrepublik Deutschland
- Case: C-222/02
- CelexID: 62002J0222
- Case type: Reference for a preliminary ruling
- Chamber: Full court
- Nationality of parties: Germany
- Procedural history: Bundesgerichtshof, Beschluß vom 16 May 2002 (III ZR 48/01)

Court composition
- Judge-Rapporteur; Claus Christian Gulmann
- Advocate General; Christine Stix-Hackl

Instruments cited
- Brasserie du pêcheur and Factortame [1996] ECR I-1029; Dillenkofer and Others [1996] ECR I-4845; Evans [2003] ECR I-14447; Directive 94/19/EC, Arts. 3 & 7; Directive 77/780/EEC; Directive 89/299/EEC; Directive 89/646/EEC

Keywords
- Credit institutions – Deposit-guarantee schemes – Directive 94/19/EC – Directives 77/780/EEC, 89/299/EEC and 89/646/EEC – Supervisory measures by the competent authority for the purposes of protecting depositors – Liability of the supervisory authorities for losses resulting from defective supervision

Paul v Germany [2004] ECR I-09425 is a European Court of Justice case regarding the civil liability of bank regulators in a case where those regulators were alleged to have failed in their duty. As of November 2008, it is the only ECJ case to consider the Deposit Guarantee Directive (94/19/EC), which was one of the causes of the Icesave dispute between Iceland and the United Kingdom in late 2008.

== Judgment ==
The Court ruled that the various Directives on banking supervision did not confer rights on individuals, and so individual depositors were not entitled to damages from banking supervisors if those Directives were breached. The only individual right guaranteed under European Union law was the minimum deposit insurance, covering the first 20 000 euros.

== See also ==
- EU law
