= Depositors' and Investors' Guarantee Fund =

The Depositors' and Investors' Guarantee Fund (Icelandic: Tryggingarsjóður innstæðueigenda og fjárfesta) is the statutory deposit insurance scheme in Iceland. It is established under Act No. 98/1999 on Deposit Guarantees and Investor-Compensation Scheme, which transposes European Union directives 94/19/EC and 97/9/EC into Icelandic law, in accordance with the decisions of the European Economic Area.

== See also ==
- Icesave dispute
