= Landsbankinn =

Icelandic bank

Landsbankinn hf.
- Company type: Government-owned corporation (from 2008); Private (2003–2008); Government-owned corporation (prior to 2003)
- Industry: Banking
- Predecessor: Landsbanki
- Founded: 9 October 2008 (history traces back to 1885)
- Headquarters: Reykjavík, Iceland
- Number of locations: 36 branches (2023); 62 ATMs (2023)
- Area served: Iceland
- Key people: Lilja Björk Einarsdóttir (CEO); Helga Björk Eiríksdóttir (Chairwoman)
- Products: Consumer banking, corporate banking, mortgage loans, private banking, private equity, wealth management, credit cards,
- Operating income: ▲ISK 62,330 billion (2021)
- Net income: ▲ISK 28,9191 billion (2021)
- Total assets: ▲ISK 1.729 trillion (2021)
- Total equity: ▲ISK 282,645 billion (2021)
- Owner: Icelandic State Treasury (98,2%), Landsbanki (1,6%), Other investors (0,2%)
- Number of employees: About 800 (2022)
- Website: www.landsbankinn.is

Landsbankinn (Icelandic pronunciation: [ˈlan(t)sˌpauŋcɪn], lit. 'The National Bank'), originally NBI hf., is an Icelandic bank headquartered in Reykjavík. It was established in 2008 by the Icelandic government out of the domestic operations of its predecessor Landsbanki which failed during the 2008–2011 Icelandic financial crisis. It is the largest bank in Iceland and the history of its predecessor goes back to 1885. In 2022 the bank had 35 branches around Iceland. The bank has around 39% market share in the retail market and around 34% in the corporate banking market (2022). In recent years, the bank has faced criticism for shutting down and reducing the opening hours of several of its branches in smaller towns throughout Iceland.

== History ==
NBI hf. was created 9 October 2008, after the government had taken control of the insolvent Landsbanki two days earlier and decided to split all domestic operations into this new surviving version of the bank, while leaving the remaining foreign operations of Landsbanki for bankruptcy and winding-up proceedings. The total assets value declined roughly to a third for the new bank, when comparing to the previous size for the old version of the bank. The number of employees were also reduced from 2770 in 2007, to only 1233 in 2012.

In April 2011, the legal name was changed from NBI hf. to Landsbankinn hf. The bank has been mostly state owned since its establishment. In December 2009, the Icelandic State Treasury owned 81.33% of the shares and the remaining 18.67% of the shares were owned by Landsskil. In April 2013, the Icelandic State Treasury acquired 16.67% of Landsskil's shares and thus the Treasury owned 98% of the shares while Landsbankinn received 2% (500 million) of its own shares. The bank received the shares from LBI hf. with the obligation to allocate them to employees. In September 2013, 317 million shares were allocated to employees, of which employees received 119 million shares and 198 million were repurchased by the Bank for settlement of tax obligations and pension liabilities. The allocation of the remainder of the shares was completed in February 2014. In 2022, the Icelandic State Treasury owned 98.2% of the shares, the bank owned 1.6% and the remainder were owned by less than 900 other investors.

== See also ==
- List of banks in Iceland
