= Landsbanki Freezing Order 2008 =

United Kingdom financial legislation

- Statutory Instrument
- Parliament of the United Kingdom
- Citation: SI 2008/2668
- Territorial extent: United Kingdom

Dates
- Made: 10:00 am, 8 October 2008
- Laid before Parliament: 12 noon, 8 October 2008
- Commencement: 10:10 am, 8 October 2008
Other legislation
Made under	2001 c. 24, ss. 4 and 14 and schedule 3
Amended by	SI 2008/2766
Revoked by	Landsbanki Freezing (Revocation) Order 2009

Status: Revoked

Text of statute as originally enacted

The Landsbanki Freezing Order 2008 (SI 2018/2668) (later amended) is an order of HM Treasury to freeze the assets of Icelandic bank Landsbanki in the United Kingdom made under the Anti-terrorism, Crime and Security Act 2001, by virtue of the fact that the Treasury reasonably believed that "action to the detriment of the United Kingdom's economy (or part of it) has been or is likely to be taken by a person or persons." As required by the enabling Act, the Order was approved by both Houses of Parliament on 28 October 2008, which was 20 days after the Order had come into force.

The Order was made after Landsbanki was placed into receivership in Iceland. The bank offered online accounts under the trade name Icesave: some 300,000 depositors in the UK had deposits worth about £4 billion when the bank collapsed.

In a memorandum to the Joint Committee on Statutory Instruments, the Treasury stated that "the primary concern was to prohibit the flow of funds held or controlled by Landsbanki's UK branch out of the UK and back to Iceland." The same document also mentioned other reasons for making the order, namely that "the emergency legislation passed in Iceland on 7th October 2008 meant that UK creditors' rights could be prejudiced compared with other creditors" and that "the Icelandic action was likely to have a particularly significant unsettling effect on consumer confidence at a time of unprecedented disturbance of the financial sector."

== See also ==
- 2008–2011 Icelandic financial crisis
- Icesave dispute
