= European Free Trade Association Surveillance Authority =

Compliance monitoring agency for European Economic Area in some non-EU countries

EFTA States (Iceland, Norway, Liechtenstein and Switzerland) Member States to the European Union

The EFTA Surveillance Authority (ESA) monitors compliance with the Agreement on the European Economic Area (EEA) in Iceland, Liechtenstein and Norway (the EEA EFTA States). ESA operates independently of the States and safeguards the rights of individuals and undertakings under the EEA Agreement, ensuring free movement, fair competition, and control of state aid.

The EEA was established to extend the provisions on the internal market of the European Union to the EFTA Countries. It unites the 27 EU Member States and the three EEA EFTA States in a single economic market. With approximately 450 million people, it is one of the largest single areas in the world with common market rules. Despite being a member of EFTA, Switzerland does not take part in the EEA because it chose not to ratify the Agreement following a negative referendum on the matter.

To ensure a homogenous European Economic Area, EEA-relevant EU acts are continuously incorporated into the EEA Agreement. However, EU legislation does only become part of the legislation of the EEA EFTA countries once they have agreed to incorporate it.

ESA monitors the timely implementation of EEA law (such as directives and regulations) by the EEA EFTA States and may investigate whether national legislation or practices are in line with EEA law. Such an investigation may lead to the launching of formal infringement proceedings against an EFTA State, a three-step procedure which may result in ESA referring the case to the EFTA Court.

ESA is based in Brussels, Belgium with 90 employees of 22 different nationalities, and its working language is English. Enterprises and individuals can, however, address ESA in any official EFTA language.

== Establishment ==
The original plan for the European Economic Area did not include the EFTA Surveillance Authority, and instead had the European Commission exercising this role. However, during the negotiations for the EEA agreement, the European Court of Justice informed the Council of the European Union by way of letter that they considered that giving the EU institutions powers with respect to non-EU member states would be a violation of the treaties of the European Union, and therefore the current arrangement was developed instead.

The tasks and competences of ESA and the EFTA Court are laid down in the Agreement between the EFTA States on the Establishment of a Surveillance Authority and a Court of Justice (Surveillance and Court Agreement).

== The two-pillar structure - Relations with the EU Commission ==
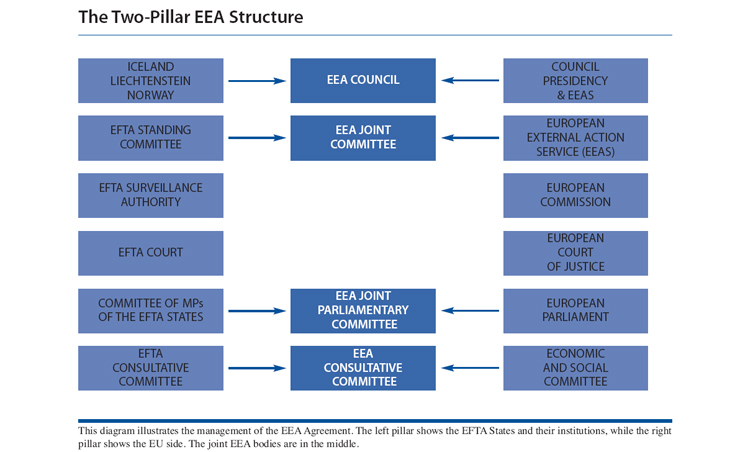
The two pillar structure of the EEA Agreement

The administration and management of the EEA is shared between the EU and the EEA EFTA States in a two-pillar structure where the EU and its institutions constitute one pillar, while the EEA EFTA States and their institutions constitute the other pillar, mirroring those of the EU. Between those two pillars several joint bodies have been established, such as the EEA Council and the EEA Joint Committee. Through these joint bodies, the 31 EEA States jointly implement and develop the EEA Agreement.

The two-pillar structure is necessary because the EEA EFTA States have not transferred any competences regarding surveillance and judicial review to the EU. In order for decisions made by EU institutions to apply to the EEA EFTA States, certain competences and tasks which are carried out by bodies in the EU pillar have to be conferred upon bodies in the EFTA pillar.

The EFTA Surveillance Authority (ESA) has powers that are similar to those of the European Commission, but the two institutions oversee the application of the same laws in different parts of the EEA. ESA monitors the EEA EFTA States while the EU Commission monitors the EU Member States. However, ESA does not propose new laws or policies as the Commission does. Due to their mirror roles and the need to ensure uniform application of law, ESA cooperates closely with the EU Commission. The two bodies consult each other and exchange data, and in the event of disagreement, negotiations are referred to by the EEA Joint Committee.

== Functions ==
ESA's primary task is to ensure that relevant EU law is properly transposed and enforced by the EEA EFTA States - Iceland, Liechtenstein and Norway. In this context, ESA broadly performs the same roles as the European Commission, and the two bodies work closely together. If an EEA EFTA State does not implement EEA rules or does not to so correctly or in a timely manner, ESA may initiate infringement proceedings against the EEA EFTA State concerned. This may ultimately be adjudicated by the EFTA Court. Where ESA has information on any domestic legislation or practices that may not be in compliance with EEA law, it can likewise decide to initiate an investigation.

ESA seeks to protect the rights of individuals and market participants. Private persons, NGOs and companies may lodge complaints with ESA against Iceland, Liechtenstein or Norway if they consider national legislation or administrative measures to be incompatible with a provision or principle of EEA law. Such rules or practices may, for example, be discriminatory, impose unnecessary burdens or commercial activity or constitute unlawful state aid. ESA can also decide to initiate an investigation if it has information on any domestic legislation or practices that may not be in compliance with EEA law.

ESA monitors State aid granted by Iceland, Liechtenstein and Norway in order to allow fair competition and an open internal market in the European Economic Area. State aid is public support to commercial activities and can take many forms, for example cash grants, tax breaks or favourable loans. As a rule, the EEA Agreement prohibits State aid to prevent negative impacts on trade, but exceptions are made for certain purposes such as environmental protection, regional support and research, innovation and development. ESA's task is to enforce the general prohibition on State aid that applies in Iceland, Liechtenstein and Norway but also to decide how exceptions to the general prohibition are to apply.

ESA also enforces competition rules in Iceland, Liechtenstein and Norway. Competition law enables markets to work effectively for the benefit of the customer and prohibits anticompetitive coordination between companies, such as agreeing to fix prices or refrain from competing head-on. The rules also prohibit dominant companies from abusing their market power, for example by obstructing their rivals' ability to compete. In this regard, ESA enjoys wide powers of investigation and may impose fines of up to 10% of global turnover on companies that breach the competition rules. To ensure a uniform application of the EEA competition rules, there is a system of cooperation between ESA and the national competition authorities, the national courts and the European Commission.

ESA has been allocated with specific tasks in supervising financial services. ESA has the powers to adopt certain defined decisions that are legally binding on national supervisory authorities and market operators (including credit institutions, insurance companies and investment firms) established in the EFTA States. To ensure consistency within the entire EEA such binding decisions will be adopted on the basis of drafts from the EU European Supervisory Authorities (EBA, EIOPA and ESMA), either on the initiative of ESA or on the initiative of the relevant EU authority.

ESA monitors the implementation and application of EEA transport rules. These rules seek to facilitate clean, safe and efficient travel for passengers and goods throughout Europe, thereby supporting the development of the Internal Market and the right of citizens to travel freely throughout the EEA. ESA monitors different transport sectors. These are road, rail, air and maritime transport as well as passenger rights. One of ESA's responsibilities in the field of aviation and maritime transport is to carry out security inspections in the EEA EFTA States, in order to monitor the application of the relevant EEA legislation.

ESA is also responsible for monitoring implementation and application of EEA legislation on food and feed, animal health and welfare by Iceland and Norway. These sectors cover a wide range of issues relating to food and feed safety, veterinary medicinal products, residues, animal health, animal welfare and organic production. Compliance is partly ensured through audits of the national controls systems, which enables ESA to assess Iceland's and Norway's legislation in these fields. The legislation in this sector is characterized by its dynamic nature and is linked to, for example, emerging issues relating to animal and public health such as outbreaks of infectious diseases.

== Organisation ==
ESA is led by a college of three members, one from each State. All decisions that formally bind ESA are taken by the college. The college is appointed for a period of four years by the three participating EFTA States. Although the college members are appointed by the member States, they undertake their functions independently and free of political direction.

The college currently consists of:

- Arne Røksund, Norway, President
- Nuscha Wieczorek, Liechtenstein
- Árni Páll Árnason, Iceland

The college has assigned responsibility for the preparation and implementation of its decisions in ESA's various fields of activity. In addition to the college and administration, ESA consists of three legal departments. These are the Internal Market Affairs (IMA), Competition and State Aid (CSA) and the Legal and Executive Affairs Department (LEA).

== See also ==
- High Authority of the ECSC
- European Free Trade Association
- EFTA Court
- European Economic Area
- European Union
- Free trade areas in Europe
