= Landsbanki =

Failed Icelandic commercial bank

Landsbanki hf
- Type: Private (2003–2008); Government-owned corporation (prior to 2003)
- Industry: Banking
- Founded: Reykjavík, Iceland, 1885 (commenced operations on 1 July 1886)
- Defunct: Entered into receivership 7 October 2008, awaiting dissolution remaining assets
- Successor: NBI hf
- Headquarters: Reykjavík, Iceland
- Key people: Björgólfur Guðmundsson (Chairman of the board), Halldór J. Kristjánsson (co-CEO), Sigurjón Þ. Arnason (co-CEO)
- Number of employees: 2,770 (2007)
- Website: landsbanki.is

Landsbanki (Icelandic pronunciation: [ˈlan(t)sˌpauŋcɪ], lit. 'National Bank'), also commonly known as Landsbankinn ([ˈlan(t)sˌpauŋcɪn], lit. 'The National Bank') was one of the largest Icelandic commercial banks; it failed as part of the 2008–2011 Icelandic financial crisis when its subsidiary sparked the Icesave dispute. On October 7, 2008, the Icelandic Financial Supervisory Authority took control of Landsbanki and created a new bank for all the domestic operations called Nýi Landsbanki (New Landsbanki) and the bank continued to operate under the same name.

Prior to its failure, the bank was one of the largest Icelandic banks with assets of ISK 3,058 billion in December 2007 and a market capitalization of ISK 383 billion. It began operation in 1885 and was instrumental in the economic development of business and industry in Iceland. From 1927 to 1961, the bank acted as the central bank until it was replaced by the Central Bank of Iceland, although this interest was primarily directed towards note issuance rather than monetary policy. The bank had been state-owned and was privatized in stages between 1998 and 2003.

Landsbanki had positioned itself as Iceland's primary provider of general and specialized financial services to individuals, corporate entities, and institutions. The bank had the country's most extensive branch network with 40 branches and sub-branches. At the end of 2006, Landsbanki provided close to 40% of corporate lending in Iceland, and for around 60% of companies listed on the OMX Iceland Stock Exchange, Landsbanki was their principal bank or one of two banks with whom they did business. The leading provider of M&A, derivatives, equity and fixed income services.

It started to expand overseas in 2000 through a number of acquisitions and organic growth, the expansion would lead to the creation of its Icesave subsidiary in 2006 which would ultimately seal its fate.

== History ==
In establishing Landsbanki, the Icelandic parliament hoped to boost monetary transactions and encourage the country's nascent industries. Following its opening on 1 July 1886, the bank's first decades of operation were restricted by its limited financial capacity; it was little more than a savings and loan society. Following the turn of the 20th century, however, Icelandic society progressed and prospered as industrialization finally made inroads, and the bank grew and developed in parallel to the nation. In the 1920s, Landsbanki became Iceland's largest bank and was made responsible for issuing its banknotes. After the issuing of banknotes was transferred to the newly established Central Bank of Iceland in 1961, Landsbanki continued to develop as a commercial bank, expanding its branch network in the ensuing decades.

While still publicly owned it went through a state-directed merger with Samvinnubanki (Cooperative Bank).

Liberalisation of financial services, beginning in 1986, opened up new opportunities, which the bank managed to take advantage of despite some economic adversity. In 1997, Landsbanki was incorporated as a limited-liability company, and the ensuing privatization finally concluded in 2003. Landsbanki then operated as a privately owned bank, competing in a free market, with substantial international activities added to its traditional Icelandic operations.

=== International expansion ===
The relatively limited size of the Icelandic market prompted Landsbanki, the first among Icelandic commercial banks, to expand and diversify outside of Iceland when it acquired the London-based Heritable Bank in 2000. In 2005, Landsbanki acquired three Europe securities houses: Teather & Greenwood, located in London and Edinburgh; Kepler Capital Markets, headquartered in Paris; and Merrion Capital Group in Dublin. These subsidiaries dealt in securities and prepared equity research in London, Paris, Frankfurt, Zürich, Nyon (25 km from Geneva), Milan, Madrid and Amsterdam. Landsbanki's own branches in London and Amsterdam specialized in structured finance and commercial finance (asset-based lending), while Landsbanki Luxembourg handled private banking and wealth management, as well as corporate services.

On 9 August 2007 Landsbanki completed its acquisition of UK investment bank Bridgwell plc. The operations of Teather & Greenwood were combined with those of Bridgewell under the brand name Landsbanki Securities (UK). The acquisition of Bridgewell made Landsbanki the second largest broker to listed companies on the London Stock Exchange measured by the number of clients.

In December 2008 Kepler Capital Markets is sold to management and staff through a management-led buy-out (MBO).

=== Icesave ===
An online savings account program for the UK market, Icesave, was launched in October 2006. Icesave grew rapidly, and on 31 March 2007, its deposits totaled £2.8 bn with over 80,000 accounts opened.

A key factor in Icesave's appeal to savers was its interest rate guarantee: The gross Annual Equivalent Rate of Interest (AER) paid on balances over £250 was guaranteed to exceed the Bank of England Base Rate by at least 0.25% until 1 October 2009 and thereafter not to be lower than the Bank of England Base Rate until 1 October 2011. As a result, Icesave quickly became the market leader in Internet deposit savings accounts in the UK in terms of interest rates.

Icesave operated in the Netherlands from May 2008 until October 2008.

On 7 October 2008 the Icesave UK website announced: "We are not currently processing any deposits or any withdrawal requests through our Icesave internet accounts. We apologize for any inconvenience this may cause our customers. We hope to provide you with more information shortly." and Icesave was declared in default on 8 October 2008, taking Landsbanki with it in its fall.

=== 2008 financial crisis ===
On October 7, 2008, the Icelandic Financial Supervisory Authority took control of Landsbanki. A press release by the IFSA states that all of Landsbanki's domestic branches, call centers, ATMs, and internet operations will be open for business as usual and that all domestic deposits are fully guaranteed. The Guardian reported that the Government had moved quickly to use the sweeping powers granted by the Reykjavik parliament, the night before. The country's financial regulator said on Tuesday that Landsbanki's branches would open as usual and that all “domestic deposits” were fully guaranteed. The next day the United Kingdom Chancellor of the Exchequer Alistair Darling announced that his government would foot the entire bill for British Icesave savers, estimated at £4 billion, and that he was taking steps to freeze the assets of Landsbanki using the financial freezing-orders provisions of the Anti-terrorism, Crime and Security Act 2001.

Under the Landsbanki Freezing Order 2008, passed on 8 October 2008, Her Majesty's Treasury froze the assets of Landsbanki in the UK, and assets belonging to the Central Bank of Iceland, and the Government of Iceland relating to Landsbanki.

On 9 October 2008 the domestic, Icelandic branch was split off into the NBI, Nýi Landsbanki (New Landsbanki) and on 27 October 2008 the inability to render payment of deposits was declared for the remaining parts of Landsbanki.

== Sponsorship of sports: Landsbankadeildin ==
Landsbanki's sponsorship of football was an important aspect of the Bank's marketing and image policy. In September 2005, an agreement was concluded with the Football Association of Iceland, under which the Icelandic premier league for both men and women will be called the Landsbanki Premier League (Landsbankadeildin) for the next four seasons. The financial backing for football was, however, primarily directed towards supporting sports for children and youth divisions.

== Landsbanki liquidation and repayment of claims ==
On 28 January 2013, the EFTA Court cleared Iceland of all charges, meaning that no loan agreement will be settled between the Icelandic state and the UK and the Netherlands, to guarantee their claim for repayment of Icelandic minimum deposit guarantees worth €4.0bn plus accrued interests. This claim will however still exist towards the Landsbanki receivership as a so-called "First priority claim", and will be met in full if the receivership succeeds to liquidate assets with a value equal to or in excess of this first priority liability.

The combined deposit repayment claims from retail Icesave customers in the Netherlands and Great Britain (including both the minimum depositor guarantees and the deposit values in excess of the Icelandic guarantee), were at first hand covered respectively by the UK Financial Services Compensation Scheme (FSCS) and by De Nederlandsche Bank (DNB), due to the inability/unwillingness for other Icelandic stakeholders to step in and ensure/guarantee immediate coverage for these claims. On 28 October 2011, the Supreme Court of Iceland ruled, that the UK FSCS and the Dutch DNB combined deposit repayments of respectively ISK 852.1bn (£4.459bn) and ISK 282.3bn (€1.668bn) should be repaid by the Landsbanki receivership as "priority claims" pursuant to Article 112 of "Act No.21/1991 on Bankruptcy", and noted these mentioned figures included contractual interest rates for the UK part and some extra penalty interest rates (6%) for the Dutch part for the period from 8 October 2008 until 22 April 2009. Together these two claims amounts to ISK 1134.4bn (€6.704bn), which is equal to 86% of all "priority claims" towards the Landsbanki receivership. Among the other priority claims are also ISK 145.4bn deposit repayment claims (equal to 11% of all "priority claims"), submitted directly by more than 200 wholesale Icesave customers in the Netherlands and Great Britain, who initially received no repayment from their national authorities, but will now get repayment on equal terms - with equal priority status - from the Landsbanki receivership.

As of 30 June 2013, the total value of the assets in the Landsbanki receivership (including the already repaid part of the claims) covered ISK 1531bn (€9.1bn), which was above the total amount of the priority claims at ISK 1325bn (€7.8bn). The final overall value for the assets is however still subject to change, as the receivership for various reasons has been granted extra time to liquidate all remaining assets until 2018, at a pace equal to approximately ISK 100bn per year. Repayment to the creditors happens step by step at the same pace as the liquidation of assets happens. The repayments so far happened through four tranches in 2011–2013, which already included a full repayment of all minimum deposit guarantees, due to their first priority status within the "priority claims". As of 12 September 2013, the Landsbanki receivership had through liquidation of the first half of its assets, managed to repay the first 53.9% (ISK 715.2bn) of all the priority claims.

According to the latest evaluation of the planned recovery of asset values, it is expected all "Priority claims" will have been fully repaid by the end of 2017. Any additional claims for accrued interests after 22 April 2009 due to the delayed repayment of priority claims, will only be treated as secondary "General claims", and thus only be repaid once all of the "Priority claims" have been repaid in full, and then only to the extent it is possible on an equal footing together with all the other remaining ISK 1677bn (€9.9bn) of "General claims" towards the Landsbanki receivership.

Status for claims towards the Landsbanki receivership as of 30 June 2013
| Claim type | Amount (bn ISK) | Accepted | Settled^{1} (bn ISK) | Repaid (bn ISK) | Remaining Liability (bn ISK) |
|---|---|---|---|---|---|
| Proprietary Interest | 4.9 | 100% | 4.9 | 0 | 0 |
| Administrative Expense | 8.5 | 100% | 6.1 | 2.4 | 0 |
| Guarantee Claims | 58.0 | 100% | 58.0 | 0 | 0 |
| Priority Claims | 1325.4 | 99.1% | 0 | 647.6 | 677.9 |
| General Claims | 1677.4 | 61.5% | 0 | 0 | 1677.4 |
| Total Claims | 3074.2 | 78.6% | 69.0 | 650.0 | 2354.2 |

Note: ^{1} Liability was not repaid by cash from liquidated assets, but got settled by other means.

According to the Landsbanki Receivership's initial interpretation of the Icelandic law, the creditor claims in foreign currency towards a liquidated Icelandic financial company in receivership should only be repaid by an ISK-equivalent amount as per the currency exchange rate registered on the date when winding-up proceedings were initiated; which was as per 22 April 2009 for the Landsbanki receivership. Moreover, it was believed the creditors had no legal right to claim compensation towards the Landsbanki receivership for any potential losses they may suffer, because of exchange rate fluctuations after 22 April 2009. On 26 September 2013, the Icelandic Supreme Court however ruled against this initial law interpretation of the Landsbanki Receivership, concluding all creditors should be fully repaid with currency amounts equal to the denoted local currency of their claim; meaning that when repaid with other currencies, then valuation of this amount should be calculated by converting it to the claim's denoted currency, according to the foreign currency exchange rates registered by the Icelandic Central Bank on the repayment date. Thus ensuring that all creditors bare no currency exchange risks, with these risks -and potential financial burdens- instead to be upheld solely by the receivership.

As the Receivership mainly holds bank assets valuated in foreign currencies, the repayment of claims is likewise expected to be conducted through partial repayments mainly in foreign currencies, equal to the available cash currency basket stemming from liquidated assets on the payment day. Because of the currency mix being more or less equal when comparing the Claims with the held Assets, the risk for currency exchange losses is expected to be relatively low for the receivership. The table below provides an overview of the currency composition of the first 3 partial repayments and how currency exchange rates were at the time compared to 22 April 2009.

| Creditor repayment tranches for those who hold "Priority Claims", and ISK currency exchange rates | 22 Apr 2009 (Winding-up proceedings) | 2 Dec 2011 (1st repayment) | | 24 May 2012 (2nd repayment) | | 5 Oct 2012 (3rd repayment) | | Total (bn) |
| Creditor repayment tranches for those who hold "Priority Claims", and ISK currency exchange rates | Fixed currency rates (ISK value of 1 currency unit) | Rate | Amount (bn) | Rate | Amount (bn) | Rate | Amount (bn) | Total (bn) |
|---|---|---|---|---|---|---|---|---|
| Canadian dollar (CAD) | 105.5 | 120.1 (+13.8%) | 0 (~ISK 0) | 128.1 (+21.4%) | 0 (~ISK 0) | 126.9 (+20.3%) | 0 (~ISK 0) | 0 (~ISK 0) |
| European euro (EUR) | 169.2 | 164.5 (-2.8%) | 1.1 (~ISK 178) | 164.9 (-2.5%) | 0 (~ISK 0) | 161.8 (-4.4%) | 0.17 (~ISK 27) | 1.27 (~ISK 205) |
| Icelandic kronur (ISK) | 1 | 1 (0.0%) | 10 (~ISK 10) | 1 (0.0%) | 0 (~ISK 0) | 1 (0.0%) | 0 (~ISK 0) | 10 (~ISK 10) |
| Great Britain pounds (GBP) | 191.1 | 191.3 (+0.1%) | 0.74 (~ISK 138) | 205.9 (+7.7%) | 0.85 (~ISK 172) | 201.4 (+5.4%) | 0.15 (~ISK 30) | 1.74 (~ISK 340) |
| US dollar (USD) | 130.7 | 121.8 (-6.8%) | 0.71 (~ISK 84) | 131.3 (+0.5%) | 0 (~ISK 0) | 124.4 (-4.8%) | 0.19 (~ISK 23) | 0.90 (~ISK 107) |
| Total repayment value in ISK (bn)^{a} | - | - | 410 | - | 172 | - | 80 | 648^{b} |

Note:
^{a}Calculated as ISK-equivalent repayment value for the receivership by the entity of the FX 22 April 2009 valued claims, while adjusting for currency exchange rate fluctuations happening on each payment date. For the example for the second repayment tranch, all creditors with claims in pounds received 1:1 repayment with cash in pounds; meaning that the repayment to these creditors had an ISK-equivalent account value then being 1:1 proportional with the ISK/Pound-rate on 22 April 2009. Contrary to this, the creditors with claims in euros/US dollars also received cash in pounds - but now at a time when these currencies had lost value against pounds - and thus the ISK-equivalent account value then was stronger with the same percentage compared to what the currencies had weakened against the pound; meaning that the repayment to these creditors had an ISK-equivalent account-value then with a relatively higher value for the receivership than 1:1, because of repaying US dollar and euro claims with a relatively stronger Pound currency compared to the 22 April 2009 registered exchange rates. Or to put in different words, the receivership by conducting the second repayment three years later than 22 April 2009 actually gained some extra positive income through exchange rate improvements for the specific cash currency (pound) involved in this repayment tranch. The applied method to calculate ISK-equivalent account values for the repayments, is in full compliance with the supreme court ruling, saying that all creditors shall be repaid by cash amounts equal to their claim as per its denoted currency, so when repaid with other currencies, then the value of this shall be booked according to the currency exchange rate registered at the repayment date.
^{b} ISK 14bn was returned in 2012 to the receivership from ESCROW accounts, as some of the remaining disputed claims got settled by the court in its favor. Thus the net total got reduced from ISK 662bn to 648bn.

=== How capital controls impact creditor repayment ===
Iceland elected a new government in April 2013, which as one of their top priorities wanted to negotiate a debt haircut towards foreign creditors of the three failed Icelandic banks now in receivership, as part of a deal to lift the long enforced (since November 2008) capital controls. As the current capital controls only ban a swap/exchange of ISK denominated assets to foreign currency, and as 97% of the Landsbanki receivership total assets are held only in foreign currency, this new Icelandic initiative will, however, most likely not affect the repayment scheme for the priority claim creditors in the Landsbanki receivership - who at the moment are forecasted to be fully repaid by the first 91.2% of the receivership assets. So even if the current capital controls remain in force at an indefinite time horizon, it will only be the last 3.2% of the assets (ISK 49/1531bn) that remain to be frozen or trapped in Iceland and can not be directly repaid, which then only would negatively impact the return rate for the creditors with general claims.

The only minor risk for the receivership's "priority claim creditors" seems to be, that the receivership might face political demands to extend the maturity of its owned Glacier bonds towards the New Landsbanki, as part of the Icelandic government's overall capital control abolition initiative, which would then delay liquidation of this specific asset. The nicknamed Glacier bonds, concern two bonds with a total value of ISK 297bn (€1.76bn), that currently are due for yearly repayments in foreign currency from New Landsbanki to the Landsbanki receivership, during the period 2014-2018. These specific repayment transfers are by some people speculated to be impossible, if the capital controls gets abolished, as such abolishment would be expected to drain the foreign capital reserves held by New Landsbanki; and thus a deal to remove capital controls is speculated will also need to imply a prolonged maturity (or repayment agreement) for these bonds.

The Icelandic government intends somehow to route the saved money from the negotiated debt haircut for creditors belonging to the receivership estates of Kaupthing and Glitnir, into a national household debt relief fund, enabling a 20% debt relief for all household mortgages. Experts from IMF however belief, that any potentially saved money from a negotiated deal, would be eaten up by the additional costs the government will need to pay in the short term, for implementing the abolishment of capital controls. In July 2013, Standard & Poors recommended Iceland drop the debt relief initiative, as they also believe it would only result in increased debt for the government - making it even more difficult to lend at credit markets, and the debt relief initiative was forecasted also to ignite high inflation pressures along with risk for the arrival of a new economic recession equal to a GDP detraction of 10%. The Icelandic government has appointed a task force to present proposals on how to achieve the government's goals, with a reporting deadline in November 2013.

=== New creditor repayment restrictions ===
On 12 March 2012, the Icelandic government amended - by Act No 17/2012 - the existing Act No 87/1992 on Foreign Exchange, so that paragraph five of Article 13n now represents new currency restrictions for repayment of foreign currency to creditors in any receivership estates. In that regard, it shall be noted that all of the first 4 repayment tranches repaid by the Landsbanki Receivership were exempted from this amended law, because it only involved available cash stemming from liquidation conducted ahead of 12 March 2012. All future repayment tranches will however be impacted by the amended law, which stipulates that the Icelandic minister of finance and minister of banking have to agree on exemptions granted by the Icelandic Central Bank for all future claim repayments stemming from companies with a larger balance sheet than ISK 400bn, even if it only involves a transfer of foreign currency. This means, that the Icelandic state now potentially also can block any further repayment of foreign currency to the creditors of the Landsbanki receivership. No court has yet judged, if this extended power of the Icelandic State, also decides the pace of foreign currency repayments, and not only ISK currency repayments are legal or illegal.

Another new repayment restriction under consideration is that the Icelandic government on 1 October 2013 presented a proposal for their 2014 budget law, to include a new 0.145% tax on all transfers from estates of failed financial companies. Some lawyers however have the opinion, that this kind of tax on failed companies could be seen as an illegal expropriation by the Icelandic state. If the Icelandic government passes this proposed law, it will almost with certainty become challenged in a lawsuit by the receivership estates behind the three failed Icelandic banks.

== See also ==
- Glitnir
- Kaupthing Bank
- Central Bank of Iceland
- Icesave dispute
