= History of Landsbanki =

In establishing Landsbanki, the Icelandic parliament hoped to boost monetary transactions and encourage the country's nascent industries. Following its opening on 1 July 1886, the bank's first decades of operation were restricted by its limited financial capacity; it was little more than a savings and loan society. Following the turn of the 20th century, however, Icelandic society progressed and prospered as industrialisation finally made inroads, and the bank grew and developed in parallel to the nation. In the 1920s Landsbanki became Iceland's largest bank, and was made responsible for issuing its bank notes. After the issuing of bank notes was transferred to the newly established Central Bank of Iceland in 1961, Landsbanki continued to develop as a commercial bank, expanding its branch network in the ensuing decades.

Liberalisation of financial services, beginning in 1986, opened up new opportunities, which the bank managed to take advantage of despite some economic adversity. In 1997, Landsbanki was incorporated as a limited-liability company, and the ensuing privatisation finally concluded in 2003. Landsbanki now operates as a privately owned bank, competing in a free market, with substantial international activities added to its traditional Icelandic operations.

== 1886–1895: Banking as a sideline ==
Created by an Act of the Icelandic parliament, Althingi, Landsbanki Íslands commenced operation on 1 July 1886, when it opened on the street known as Baker's Hill (Bakarabrekka), later called Bank Street (Bankastræti) in the centre of Reykjavík.

The bank's establishment was intended to boost monetary transactions and the country's nascent industries. For most of the 19th century Iceland had neither a monetary institution nor financial services. Money could be sent to Denmark for safe custody, e.g. by purchasing state savings bonds. Loans could only be obtained, if at all, from well-off individuals, while merchants could only be convinced to loan goods on credit.

The frequently heard complaint of a "money shortage" referred both to the lack of credit and a lack of currency to pay what could not be paid for in produce, such as stockfish, wool or butter. The establishment of savings societies alleviated the situation only slightly, as did loans made by the national treasury from its reserves; this was an emergency fund, intended to provide relief in times of difficulty or economic setbacks. But the country sorely needed a real bank, and no Danish banks were tempted to open a branch in Iceland. Danish experts advised instead that an Icelandic bank be established, and the recently re-established Icelandic parliament was quick to grasp the opportunity.

The Act establishing Landsbanki Íslands entrusted the National Treasury to issue banknotes, which served as the bank's funding. Although this was the era of banknotes backed by gold, Icelandic treasury notes had no such backing and could not be redeemed. They could, however, be used to pay taxes and other levies. Limiting note issuance kept the currency on par with gold-backed Danish notes, and managed to substantially improve the country's shortage of cash.

Lárus E. Sveinbjörnsson, a high court judge, worked part-time as the first managing director of the bank, as did its comptroller and cashier. The first spring after it opened, the Bank was augmented by the acquisition of the assets and goodwill of the Reykjavík Savings Bank (Sparisjóður Reykjavíkur), the largest in the country. By far the greatest share of the bank's operating capital was invested in long-term mortgages; its only services consisted of accepting deposits and granting loans. The bank was a profit-making venture; its costs were low and its low-risk loans granted with a hefty interest rate spread. Soon it had managed to collect a sizeable reserve, but its impact was less than hoped for. Residents living outside of Reykjavík soon complained that there were no signs of the local branches promised in the parliamentary statute. The capital's own citizens were far from satisfied with having the bank open only for several hours, two days a week and in 1889 daily opening hours were introduced. Two years later, the wages of the bank's employees were raised to reflect their longer working hours, making them Iceland's first banking professionals. In 1893 Lárus Sveinbjörnsson consequently returned to the High Court and a full-time managing director, Tryggvi Gunnarsson, was appointed.

== 1896–1905: Head office built and branches opened ==
Tryggvi Gunnarsson put his many years of political and business experience to good use in expanding Landsbanki's operations. He developed contacts with foreign banks, so that the bank was able to offer inexpensive international money transfers, While the majority of lending was still real estate mortgages, some credit was provided for expansion in fisheries, where larger, decked fishing vessels were appearing.

Just prior to the dawn of the new century, the stately Landsbanki headquarters (costing half of the bank's reserve funds) opened on the corner of Austurstræti and Pósthússtræti, where the Bank has remained to this day. The imposing Neo-Renaissance style of the structure made it "quite the equal of such premises in the world’s great cities". Landsbanki's operations grew steadily – not least following the establishment of a mortgage department, which could grant credit secured by real estate other than farm property. Funding for these loans was obtained by issuing the bank's first bond series, sold both in Iceland and Denmark.

This enabled Landsbanki to increase lending to industry, making its operations more like a real bank rather than a savings and loan society. A few years into the new century, the parent bank in Reykjavík was well enough established to expand, opening an Akureyri branch in North Iceland in 1902 and another in Ísafjörður, in the West Fjords, in 1904. During its six years of growth in the new century, its balance sheet increased sixfold. Despite the advent of a new competitor: a privately owned bank, Íslandsbanki, mainly owned by Danish investors, appeared on the scene in 1904 and launched its operations by opening three branches.

While Landsbanki had done its best to provide credit for upgrading of the fishing fleet with decked vessels, its funding was limited during these early years and clearly constrained the fishing industry's development. Just prior to the turn of the century, Danish financiers offered to take over the bank, strengthen its financial basis and list in on the Danish stock exchange. The new bank would serve as a central bank for Iceland, issuing notes backed by gold, as was the practice in other countries. A hot dispute among Icelandic politicians as whether to accept or refuse this offer, was concluded by the Althingi's adoption in 1901 of an act authorising the inception of the new bank – but refusing to have it take over Landsbanki.

This gave the investors second thoughts, as many doubted there was scope for two banks in the small nation. Íslandsbanki did eventually open, however, the same year as Home Rule began in Iceland, and at the same time as motorised fishing vessels and commercial trawlers were beginning a revolution in the country's fisheries. Íslandsbanki was well funded and, despite being a privately owned bank, had exclusive right to issue banknotes backed by gold. It concentrated on lending to industry, especially to larger merchants and the fisheries sector, providing Landsbanki with stiff competition.

== 1906–1915: Weathering the storms ==
Subject to the control of parliament and the cabinet, Landsbanki has more than once been the focus of political disputes. A change in government in 1909 meant difficulties for Tryggvi Gunnarsson, Landsbanki's managing director and prominent member of the outgoing Home Rule party led by his nephew, Hannes Hafstein. Within a year Hafstein's successor, Björn Jónsson, dismissed Gunnarsson, together with the bank's two appointed supervisors. He followed up by appointing a fellow Independence Party member, the merchant Björn Kristjánsson, as managing director of the bank. Soon it was decided to divide responsibility for the bank's affairs between two men, and two directors were appointed.

Both the Minister's motivation and methods brought forth highly vocal criticism, and eventually his party split and he himself was forced to step down following a vote of no confidence. Landsbanki emerged from the disputes relatively unscathed; it would subsequently have three managing directors, appointed on a party political basis, partly reflecting the balance of political power. It did not, however, escape a major fire in central Reykjavík in 1915, which destroyed Landsbanki's headquarters plus another 11 buildings. The bank's accounts, valuable documents and its notes and coin were saved, however.

== 1916–1925: In temporary premises ==
Following the 1915 fire, Landsbanki was provisionally housed across the street in the main post office and the Reykjavík Apothecary. Despite the cramped and less than suitable quarters the bank continued to grow, opening branches in Eskifjörður in the East Fjords and Selfoss in South Iceland in 1918.

During the economic upheaval caused by World War I countries abandoned the gold standard. The currency issuer in Iceland, Íslandsbanki, was authorised to issue Icelandic krónur notes not backed by gold, but which it was to keep at par value with Danish kroner. Which Íslandsbanki could not manage, as both banks' activities during the post-war years especially reflected the country's economic difficulties and plummeting prices for Icelandic exports. The major economic crisis caused widespread defaults on loans, especially at Íslandsbanki. It lost its monopoly to issue banknotes and after a two-year dispute the question was resolved and Landsbanki was granted this right. From 1924 onwards, Landsbanki regained its vitality and re-opened in new and even more imposing premises built on its former Austurstræti location. The building was designed by State Architect Guðjón Samúelsson and decorated with murals by painters Jón Stefánsson and Jóhannes Kjarval.

== 1926–1935: The country’s leading bank ==
By the beginning of 1927, Landsbanki had become Iceland's largest bank. Its financial situation was considerably more solid and the government was prepared to do its part to strengthen the state bank rather than a foreign-owned private bank. An act of parliament passed later that year formally made it the country's national bank, with a new central bank division created alongside its commercial bank and mortgage lending operations. The bank's board of governors was to be composed of five members, four of them elected by Althingi and a fifth, the chairman, appointed by the Minister. Amendments to the act a year later included a state guarantee for the bank's obligations, including deposits, adding to its advantage over Íslandsbanki. The first bank branch in Reykjavík opened in 1931, adding to Landsbanki's contribution towards keeping the wheels of business and industry in motion after the Great Depression had reached Iceland.

Relations between Landsbanki and Íslandsbanki were a complicated affair. Although the state had the largest say in controlling their operations, it only owned one of the two. In daily operations they were competitors, with Íslandsbanki at an increasing disadvantage. On the other hand, as the central bank, Landsbanki had responsibilities, which were put to the test in 1929, when Íslandsbanki suffered a series of setbacks that it was in no position to withstand, causing depositors to panic. The bank was forced to close its doors early in 1930. No rescue attempt was made by the central bank but Althingi eventually decided to resurrect the bank as the largely state-owned Fisheries' Bank of Iceland (Útvegsbanki Íslands), enticing former creditors to accept a stake in the bank as compensation for claims. The same year a third state bank opened, the Agricultural Bank of Iceland (Búnaðarbanki Íslands), establishing a state-owned banking system which would last for several decades, with Landsbanki both the central bank and by far the largest commercial bank.

== 1936–1945: Depression and war ==
The Great Depression stifled economic activity in Iceland, and it was only with the beginning of World War II that Landsbanki's situation began to improve significantly. An addition to its city centre headquarters was taken into service in the summer of 1940.

Soon afterwards official trading in securities began, when the Landsbanki Securities Exchange opened just before Christmas 1942. Growth during the wartime years from 1939 to 1944 was so rapid that turnover at Landsbanki's main branch in Reykjavík increased tenfold – not least due to favourable trading terms between Iceland and the Allied nations.

== 1946–1955: Trade protectionism ==
After the war, foreign currency was in such short supply that a variety of restrictions were imposed on trade and commerce. In an attempt to cope with the difficult economic situation, the currency was devalued, but correcting the persistent current account deficit proved difficult. A severe housing shortage prompted the introduction of state funding for housing mortgages implemented through Landsbanki's mortgage division to help rectify the situation.

Concerned about sluggish economic growth, the government sought ways to support industry – recognising that fisheries was the key sector – and a Fisheries Credit Department was established under Landsbanki's auspices. As a result of its open-handed lending policy to the fishing industry, borrowing by this sector doubled in the following decades, rising from 23% of total loans outstanding in 1941 to 46% in 1960. The development was reflected in the major surge in the contribution of fisheries to GDP.

== 1956–1965: Central bank separated from commercial operations ==
In 1957, Landsbanki was divided into a central bank and a state-owned commercial bank. Four years later the final connections between the two were severed and subsequently the Central Bank of Iceland controlled foreign currency trading and supervised the country's commercial and savings banks. Despite the separation, commercial banking operations continued to grow during these years.

Landsbanki's branch in eastern Reykjavík moved into new premises and a new branch was opened in western Reykjavík. Another branch in the city centre, and a suburban one as well, enabled the bank it to serve the growing capital at four locations. A new branch was also opened in Húsavík, in northeast Iceland, the first rural addition since 1918.

== 1966–1975: Expansion despite economic downturn ==
During the latter part of the 1960s, the Icelandic economy suffered a series of setbacks. The herring stocks collapsed in 1967–1968 and prices for other principal seafood exports fell sharply. Once more the authorities tried to put the economy back on an even keel through devaluation, which fanned inflation and destroyed the savings of many people who failed to foresee the impact of high inflation.

Landsbanki, however, managed to keep the wind in its sails, boosting still further its rural services and branches in the capital. Technology was now making major inroads in banking. At the beginning of the 1970s, the Icelandic economy picked up once more, with high investment in new fishing vessels and processing plants, as Landsbanki's lending records bear clear witness.

== 1976–1985: Runaway inflation ==
Savings were soon swallowed up by the insatiable inflation. The way to profit was to obtain non-indexed loans at negative real interest rates from commercial and savings banks. Such loans soon shrank to a pittance as double-digit inflation raged, while leaving deposit owners with mere remnants of their savings.

The unacceptable situation was eventually brought to an end by legislation providing for indexation in 1979. The banks did their best to attract savings from Icelanders who had long since given up on depositing their money only to see it wither away. No less urgent was the need to combat excessive and often unprofitable investment which had become endemic in times of negative real interest rates.

Although inflation was far from contained, the defence of indexation used by the banks to protect their operations managed to mitigate its damaging impact. A new króna was introduced, various technological changes transformed the banking system and new financial services appeared.

== 1986–1995: Deregulation of interest rates and national consensus ==
In 1986, a new Act on Commercial Banks and Savings Banks granted deposit institutions increased independence from the Central Bank. The banks now began to set their own deposit and lending rates, and service charges. Open competition arrived in the financial market practically overnight.

Price levels in Iceland underwent a rapid transformation following the collective bargaining agreements of 1990 generally referred to as a "national consensus". The entrenched inflation subsided so rapidly that by the latter part of the year it had reached a level on par with that in neighbouring countries. Deposit institutions were indirectly involved and contributed to restraining price levels by agreeing, as part of this consensus, to accelerate cut backs in their interest rates.

At last a long sought era of stability had dawned. Business dealings were altered to confirm with more modern practices and electronic communications began to change the face of banking.

== 1996–2006: Landsbanki Íslands hf. ==
Privatisation of the state-owned bank began in the autumn of 1997 with the incorporation of Landsbanki Íslands hf. The first cautious steps were taken with public share offers, following which the state sold a 45.8% holding in Landsbanki to Samson Holding ehf. at the end of 2002. The bank's new shareholders elected a board of directors, which has since directed the bank under the leadership of its chairman, Björgólfur Guðmundsson.

Its profit in this period was significantly higher than of the preceding century or so. By the end of 2005, Landsbanki had expanded so substantially abroad that around 35% of its lending was made to international borrowers. The bank's rural branches overshadowed by subsidiaries and branches in 15 countries.

Other domestic financial powerhouses took advantage of the liberalisation of financial markets to undertake major expansion into new international markets.

=== 2008 financial crisis ===
On 7 October 2008 the Icelandic Financial Supervisory Authority has proceeded to take control of Landsbanki. A press release by the IFSA states that all of Landsbanki's domestic branches, call centres, ATMs and internet operations will be open for business as usual, and that all domestic deposits are fully guaranteed.
