= OMX Iceland 10 =

Stock market index

OMX Iceland 10 (OMXI10) was the name of a stock market index for the ten largest and most traded stocks listed on the Nasdaq Iceland stock exchange, between July 2019 and December 2023.

The OMX Iceland 8 index was renamed to OMX Iceland 10 when the index was expanded from eight to ten stocks on 1 July 2019. On 2 January 2024, the index was updated to OMX Iceland 15.

== Composition ==
The OMX Iceland 10 index constituents from the review effective on 3 July 2023 (the last semi-annual review before the index was updated to OMX Iceland 15):

Company	Symbol	GICS sector
Alvotech	ALVO	Health Care
Arion Bank	ARION	Financials
Eimskip	EIM	Industrials
Festi	FESTI	Consumer Discretionary
Icelandair Group	ICEAIR	Industrials
Íslandsbanki	ISB	Financials
Kvika Banki	KVIKA	Financials
Marel	MAREL	Industrials
Reitir Fasteignafélag	REITIR	Real Estate
Síldarvinnslan	SVN	Consumer Staples
