= List of banks in Iceland =

The following is a list of banks in Iceland.

== Contemporary banks ==
=== Central ===
- Central Bank of Iceland

=== Commercial ===
- Arion Bank (formerly known as New Kaupthing)
- Íslandsbanki (formerly known as New Glitnir)
- Landsbankinn (formerly known as New Landsbanki)
- Kvika banki

=== Investment ===
- Kvika banki

== Defunct banks ==
- Askar Capital (privately owned)
- Búnaðarbanki (merged with Kaupthing, became KB Bank and later Kaupthing Bank)
- Glitnir (previously government-owned, privatized, went back into government hands during the Icelandic financial crisis)
- Iðnaðarbanki (merged with Útvegsbanki, Alþýðubanki, Verzlunarbanki and Samvinnubanki)
- Íslandsbanki (First Íslandsbanki was founded in 1904, went bankrupt during the Great Depression. Second Íslandsbanki came into existence when the government owned banks Útvegsbanki, Samvinnubanki, Iðnaðarbanki and Verslunarbanki merged. Íslandsbanki was later re-branded as Glitnir Bank, which was taken into government administration late 2008. The third Íslandsbanki emerged on 20. February 2009 when the government-owned Glitnir Bank was re-branded as Íslandsbanki.)
- Kaupthing Bank (previously government-owned, privatized, went back into government hands during the Icelandic financial crisis)
- Landsbanki (previously government-owned, privatized, went back into government hands during the Icelandic financial crisis)
- Samvinnubanki (merged with Iðnaðarbanki, Alþýðubanki, Verzlunarbanki and Útvegsbanki)
- Saga Investment Bank
- SPB hf (formerly Icebank) <http://www.straumur.com/media/spb-frettir/Creditor_s-Report-September-2014.pdf.
- Útvegsbanki (merged with Iðnaðarbanki, Alþýðubanki, Verzlunarbanki and Samvinnubanki)
- Verzlunarbanki (merged with Útvegsbanki, Alþýðubanki, Iðnaðarbanki and Samvinnubanki)

== See also ==
- Economy of Iceland
- List of banks in Europe
