= Economy of Iceland =

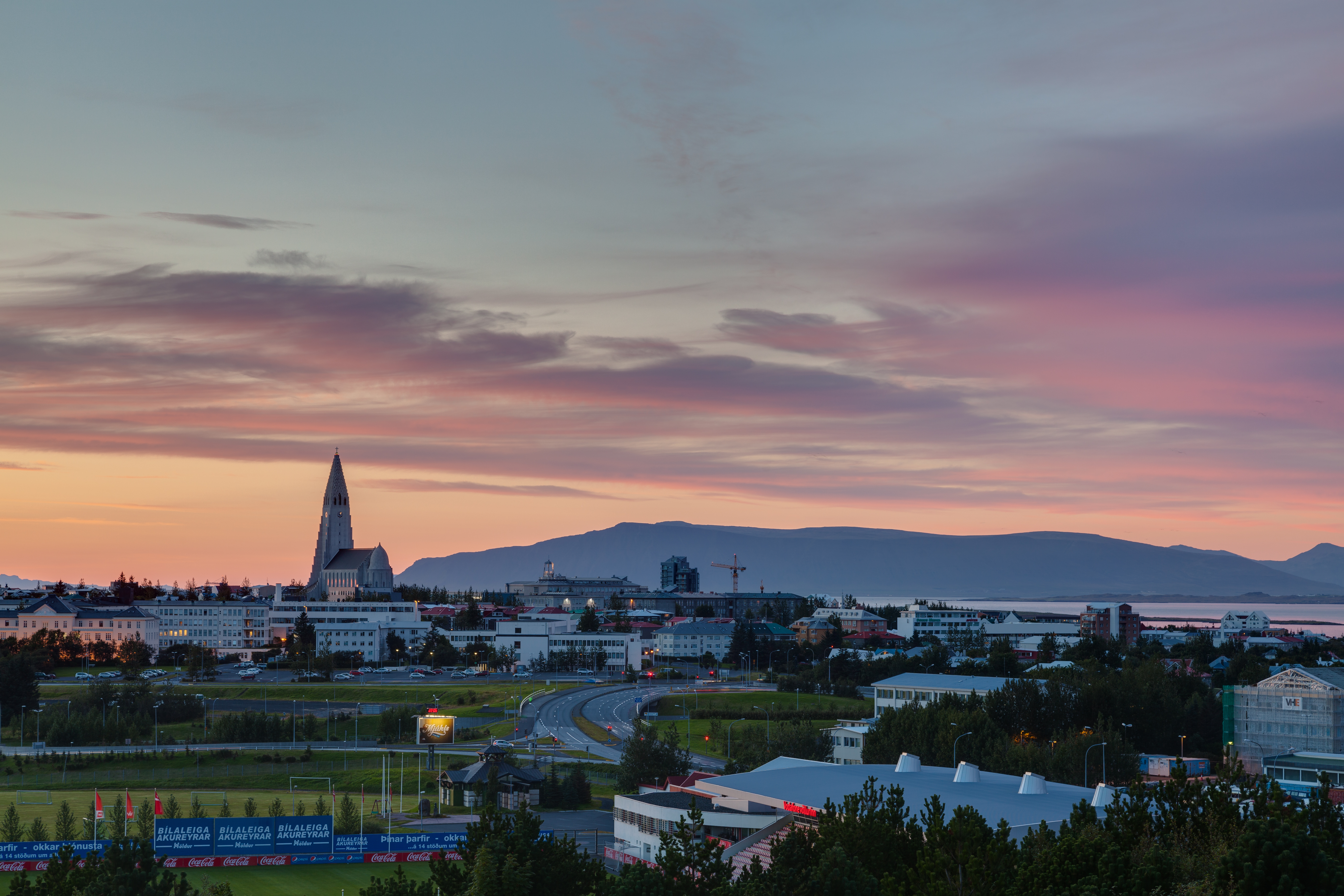
- Reykjavík
- Currency: Icelandic króna (ISK, kr)
- Fiscal year: Calendar year
- Trade organisations: EFTA, EEA, OECD, WTO
- Country group: Advanced economy; High-income economy

Statistics
- Population: ▲392,404 (2025)
- GDP: ▲$43.80 billion (nominal, 2026); ▲$32.93 billion (PPP, 2026)
- GDP rank: 102th (nominal, 2026); 148rd (PPP, 2026)
- GDP growth: ▼1.7% (2024); ▲2.0% (2025)
- GDP per capita: ▲$110,048 (nominal, 2026); ▲$82,730 (PPP, 2026)
- GDP per capita rank: 6th (nominal, 2026); 15th (PPP, 2026)
- GDP per capita growth: ▼ -1.2% (2024)
- GDP by sector: Manufacturing: 10.7%; Real estate: 10.4%; Wholesale: 9.0%; (2023 est.)
- Inflation (CPI): ▼4.3% (2025)
- Population below national poverty line: ▼4.9% – income below 1,200€/ month (2021); ▼9.0% at risk of poverty or social exclusion (2023)
- Gini coefficient: ▼23.2 (2018)
- Human Development Index: ▲0.972 very high (2025) (1st); ▲0.923 very high IHDI (1st) (2023)
- Corruption Perceptions Index: ▲77 out of 100 points (2024) (10th)
- Labour force: ▲240,000 (2023 est.); ▲85.3% employment rate (2023)
- Labour force by occupation: Agriculture: 3.8%; Industry: 21.1%; Services: 64.4%; (2023 est.)
- Unemployment: 3.6% (2025)
- Youth unemployment: 8.7% (2025)
- Average gross salary: 804,000 ISK / €5,500 month (2023)
- Average net salary: 578,000 ISK / €4,000 month (2023)
- Main industries: Tourism, fish processing; aluminum smelting; geothermal power, hydropower; medical/pharmaceutical products

External
- Exports: ▼$7.31 billion (2023 est)
- Export goods: Raw aluminium, fish fillets, non-fillet frozen fish, and orthopedic appliances (2023)
- Main export partners: Netherlands $1.97B; Germany $771M; United States $735M; United Kingdom $607M; Norway $444M; (2023)
- Imports: ▼$9.85 billion (2023 est.)
- Import goods: Refined petroleum, cars, carbon-based electronics, aluminium oxide, and computers (2023)
- Main import partners: Norway $1.11B; China $908M; Germany $903M; Netherlands $745M; United States $694M; (2023)
- FDI stock: ▼$6.666 billion (31 December 2017 est.); ▼ Abroad: $5.23 billion (2023 est.)
- Current account: ▲$385 million (2023 est.)
- Gross external debt: ▼$25.3 billion (September 2024 est.)

Public finance
- Government debt: ▲95.9% of GDP (2023 est.)
- Foreign reserves: ▲902.4 billion kr (2025 est.)
- Budget balance: 0.6% (of GDP) (2023 est.)
- Revenue: 274 billion kr (2022 est.)
- Spending: 1,930.7 billion kr (2023 est.)
- Economic aid: c. $71.9 million (0.35% GDP, 2022 budget)
- Credit rating: Moody's Investors Service: A-2 (Foreign); A-2 (Domestic); Outlook: Stable; Standard & Poor's: A (Foreign); A (Domestic); Outlook: Stable; Fitch: A (Foreign); A (Domestic); Outlook: Stable
- All values, unless otherwise stated, are in US dollars.

Iceland has a highly developed social democratic economy. In 2011, the gross domestic product (GDP) was US$12 billion. By 2018, it had increased to a nominal GDP of US$27 billion, and by 2025, it reached US$35 billion. As of 2025, it has the fifth highest nominal GDP per capita ($91,000) and fourteenth highest GDP per capita by PPP ($81,000). In 2025 Iceland topped the Human Development Index.

The nation has high levels of free trade and government intervention. However, government consumption is lower compared to other Nordic countries. 100% of Iceland's electrical grid is produced from renewable sources. Geothermal and Hydropower are the primary sources of energy in Iceland. A founding member of the OECD, Iceland has the third lowest Not in Education, Employment, or Training (NEET) rate among the youth.

The 2008–2011 Icelandic financial crisis produced a decline in GDP and employment, which has since been reversed entirely by a recovery aided by a tourism boom starting in 2010. Tourism accounted for more than 10% of Iceland's GDP in 2017. After a period of robust growth, Iceland's economy slowed down according to an economic outlook for the years 2018–2020 published by Arion Research in April of 2018.

In the 1990s Iceland undertook extensive free market reforms, which initially produced strong economic growth. As a result, Iceland was rated as having one of the world's highest levels of economic freedom as well as civil freedoms. In 2007, Iceland topped the list of nations ranked by Human Development Index and was one of the most egalitarian, according to the calculation provided by the Gini coefficient.

From 2006 onwards, the economy faced problems of growing inflation and current account deficits. Partly in response, and partly as a result of earlier reforms, the financial system expanded rapidly before collapsing entirely in the 2008–2011 Icelandic financial crisis. Iceland had to obtain emergency funding from the International Monetary Fund and a range of European countries in November 2008. The economy has since rebounded since 2010, and continues to grow to this day.

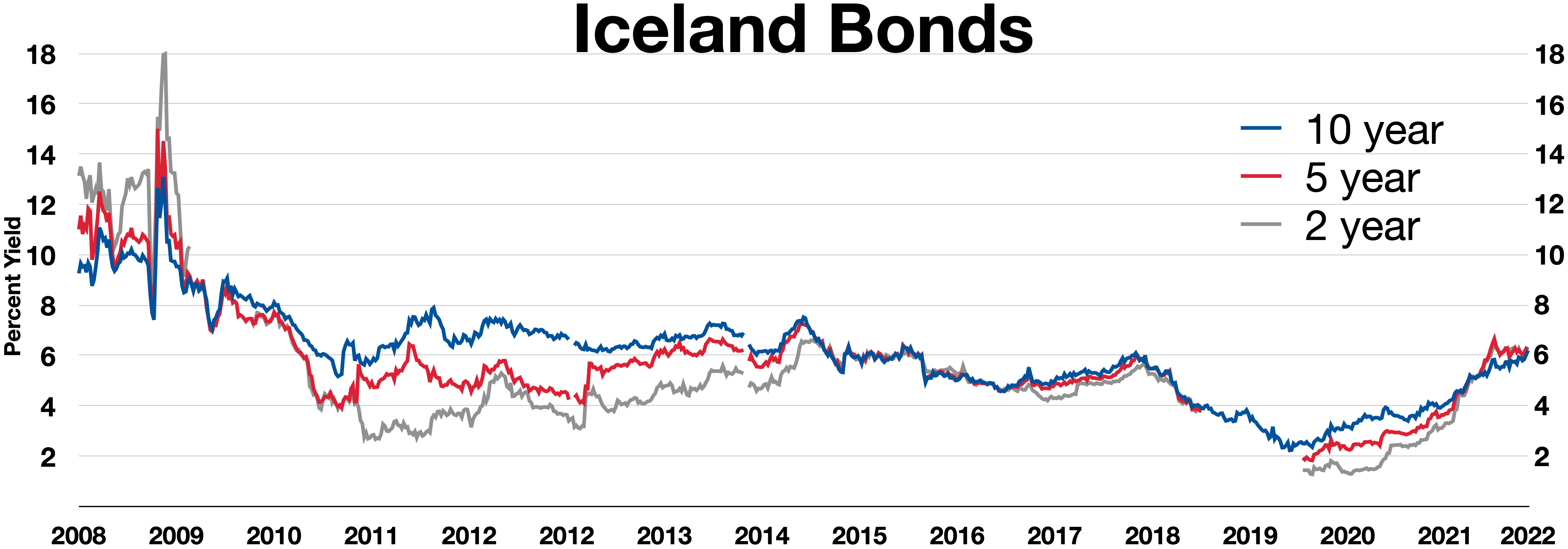
Iceland bonds had an Inverted yield curve in 2008 10 year bonds 5 year bonds 2 year bonds

== History ==
In medieval Iceland, trade was traditionally conducted through barter. The traditional nationalistic historical narrative says that Iceland had experienced a golden age from 874 until the 11th century, when the country came under foreign rule and "suffered humiliation" as its economy declined. There is very little evidence to support this narrative.

Iceland had among the lowest GDP per capita out of all the Western European countries at the start of the 20th century. An assessment by economists at the Central Bank of Iceland stated that the country's "post-World War II economic growth has been both significantly higher and more volatile than in other OECD countries", and that "the Icelandic business cycle has been largely independent of the business cycle in other industrialised countries." Iceland has had a total of twenty financial crashes since 1875, according to Reuters.

Fishing became a large part of the Icelandic economy after the 1880s, partly due to expanded fishing with sailing smacks. During the Second World War, the UK imposed trade sanctions on Iceland to prevent them from trading with Germany. After the British and later American occupations of the island, the economy was boosted by a substantial amount, and Iceland went from one of the poorest countries in Europe to one of the wealthiest. This was furthered by Iceland being included as part of the post-WWII Marshall Plan, receiving the largest amount per capita between 1948 and 1951, almost double the amount of the next highest recipient.

Towards the end of the 20th century, Iceland's economy continued to grow. A coalition between the Independence and Progressive parties led to the privatization of state-owned banks and telecommunications. Corporate income tax was reduced to 18%, inheritance tax was greatly reduced, and the net wealth tax was completely abolished. The term "Nordic Tiger" became heavily used refer to the period of economic prosperity in Iceland that began in the 1990s.

The "Nordic Tiger" period came to a sudden end as a result of the 2008 financial crisis. Iceland went from being the 10th richest country in the world in 2007 to the 21st in 2010. Banks made risky loans and manipulated markets, with the country's regulators understaffed and not properly supervising them. The Icelandic króna underwent sharp inflation, with the three largest banks in the country being placed under government control. Iceland's central bank raised its interest rate to 18% in an attempt to combat the inflation.

With help from the International Monetary Fund (IMF), Iceland's economy stabilised and managed to pay off all of its loans by the end of 2015. Economists Ásgeir Jónsson and Hersir Sigurjónsson said that "Iceland was treated differently from developing countries and former IMF clients. There was no call for Iceland to adopt sharp austerity measures at the inception of the joint economic plan. Instead, the government would be allowed to maintain large public deficits in the first year – 2009 – allowing fiscal multipliers to counteract the output contraction that was underway. Iceland also was not asked to downsize its Scandinavian-type welfare system."

== Geography and resources ==
Iceland occupies a land area of 103,000 square kilometers. It has a 4,790 kilometer coastline and a 200 nautical mile (370.4 km) exclusive economic zone extending over 758,000 square kilometers of water. Approximately only 0.7% of Iceland's surface area is arable, since the island's terrain is mostly mountainous and volcanic.

Iceland has few proven mineral resources. In the past, deposits of sulphur have been mined, and diatomite (skeletal algae) was extracted from Lake Mývatn until recently. However, today most sulphur is obtained in the desulfurization of petroleum and fossil gas. The diatomite plant has closed for environmental reasons. The only natural resource conversion in Iceland is the manufacture of cement. Concrete is widely used as building material, including for all types of residential housing.

By harnessing the abundant hydroelectric and geothermal power sources, Iceland's renewable energy industry provides close to 85% of all the nation's primary energy – proportionally more than any other country – with 99.9% of Iceland's electricity being generated from renewables.

By far the largest of the many Icelandic hydroelectric power stations is Kárahnjúkar Hydropower Plant (690 MW) in the area north of Vatnajökull. Other stations include Búrfell (270 MW), Hrauneyjarfoss (210 MW), Sigalda (150 MW), Blanda (150 MW), and more. Iceland has explored the feasibility of exporting hydroelectric energy via submarine cable to mainland Europe and also actively seeks to expand its power-intensive industries, including aluminium and ferro-silicon smelting plants.

== Sectors ==
In 2017 the proportion of Iceland's exports was: tourism 42%, seafood 17%, aluminium 16%, other 24%.

=== Tourism ===
Tourism is one of Iceland's largest export sectors. Tourism accounted for more than 12% of the country's GDP in 2017. Iceland is one of the most tourism-dependent countries on Earth. In October 2017 the tourism sector directly employed around 26,800 people, with the total number of employees in the country being 186,900.

At the start of the growth period around 2010, tourism benefited from a weak ISK, but a strong ISK then cooled down the sector. From 2010 to 2018, tourist arrivals in Iceland increased by 378%.

=== Manufacturing ===
Iceland is the world's largest electricity producer per capita. The presence of abundant electrical power due to Iceland's geothermal and hydroelectric energy sources has led to the growth of the manufacturing sector. Power-intensive industries, which are the largest components of the manufacturing sector, produce mainly for export. Manufactured products constituted 36% of all merchandise exports, an increase from the 1997 figure of 22%. Power-intensive products' share of merchandise exports is 21%, compared to 12% in 1997.

==== Aluminium ====
Aluminium smelting is the most important power-intensive industry in Iceland. There are currently three plants in operation with a total capacity of over 850,000 metric tons per year (t/yr) in 2019, putting Iceland at 11th place among aluminium-producing nations worldwide as of 2023.

Rio Tinto Alcan operates Iceland's first aluminium smelter (plant name: ISAL), in Straumsvík, near the town of Hafnarfjörður. The plant has been in operation since 1969. Its initial capacity was 33,000 metric tons (t) per year, but it has since been expanded several times and now has a capacity of about 189,000 t/yr.

The second plant started production in 1998 and is operated by Norðurál, a wholly owned subsidiary of U.S.-based Century Aluminum Company. It is located in Grundartangi in Western Iceland near the town of Akranes. Its former capacity was 220,000 t/yr but an expansion to 260,000 t/yr has already finished. In 2012, the plant produced 280,000 metric tons which was valued at 610 million dollars or 76 billion krónur. 4,300 gigawatts hours were used in the production that year, amounting to nearly one-fourth of all electrical energy produced in the country. In October 2013, Norðurál announced the start of a five-year project aimed at increasing its production by a further 50,000 t/yr.

United States–based aluminium manufacturer Alcoa runs a plant near the town of Reyðarfjörður. The plant, known as Fjardaál (or "aluminium of the fjords"), has a capacity of 346,000 t/yr and was put into operation in April 2008. To power the plant, Landsvirkjun built Kárahnjúkar, a 690-MW hydropower station. The project was enormous in the context of the Icelandic economy, increasing total installed electric power capacity from under 1,600 MW to around 2,300 MW.

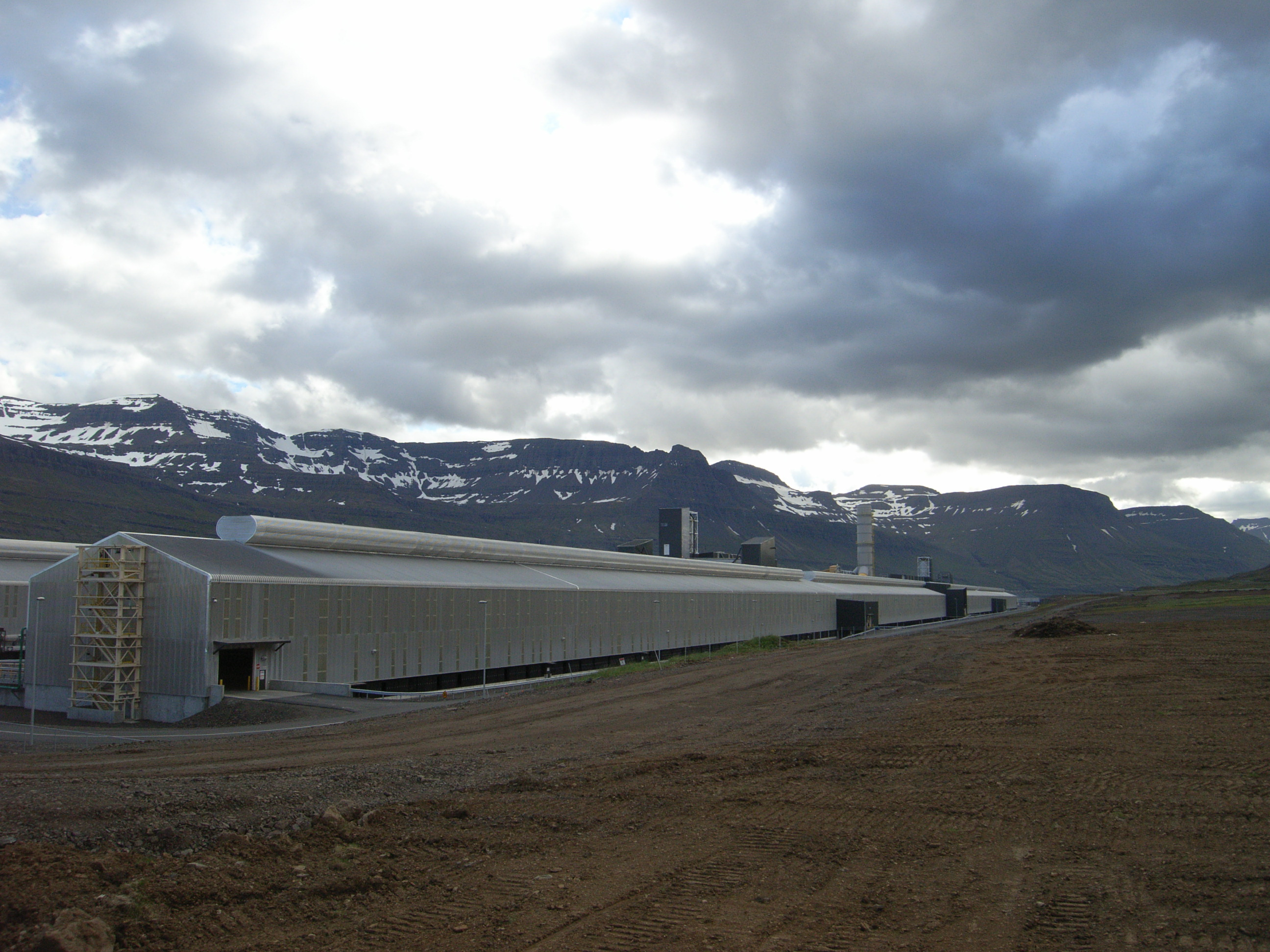
Alcoa's aluminium plant in Reyðarfjörður, Iceland

According to Alcoa, construction of Fjardaál entailed no human displacement, no impact on endangered species, and no danger to commercial fisheries; there will also be no significant effect on reindeer, bird and seal populations. However, the project drew considerable opposition from environmentalist groups such as the World Wide Fund for Nature, which called on Alcoa to abandon the plan to build Fjardaál. In addition, Icelandic singer Björk was a notable early opponent to the plan; protesting the proposed construction, the singer's mother, Hildur Rúna Hauksdóttir, went on a hunger strike in 2002.

Several other aluminium smelter projects have been planned. Between 2005 and 2011, Alcoa conducted a feasibility study for a second plant in Iceland near Húsavík. That plant was to have a 250,000 t/yr capacity, to be powered entirely by geothermal power, although later estimates showed a potential need for other sources of power. In October 2011, Alcoa announced its decision to cancel the Bakki project. In 2006, Nordurál signed a memorandum of understanding with two Icelandic geothermal power producers, Hitaveita Suðurnesja and Orkuveita Reykjavíkur, to purchase electricity for its own aluminium reduction project in Helguvík. The power supplied will initially support aluminium production of 150,000 t/yr, which will eventually grow to support 250,000 t/yr.

=== Fisheries ===
Fisheries and related sectors—in recent years labelled "the ocean cluster"—was the single most important part of the Icelandic economy (it has now been replaced by tourism) representing an overall contribution to GDP of 27.1% in 2011. The fisheries sector directly employs around 9,000 people (4,900 in fishing and 4,100 in fish processing; approximately 5 per cent of Iceland's workforce), although it is estimated that a total of between 25,000 and 35,000 people (up to 20 per cent of the workforce) depend on the ocean cluster for their livelihood. Many of these jobs are provided by technological companies that manufacture equipment for fisheries firms and by companies engaged in the advanced processing of marine products or in biotechnical production. By contrast, aquaculture remains a very small industry in Iceland, employing only around 250 people for a production of 5,000 tonnes.

Iceland is the second biggest fisheries nation in the North East Atlantic behind Norway, having overtaken the United Kingdom in the early 1990s. Since 2006, Icelandic fishing waters have yielded a total catch of between 1.1m and 1.4m tonnes of fish annually, although this is down from a peak of over 2m tonnes in 2003.

Cod remains the most important species harvested by Icelandic fisheries, with a total catch of 178,516 tonnes in 2010. The catch of cod has stagnated in recent years due to quotas, and was supplemented by the catch of blue whiting, which is used mainly for processing. The Icelandic catch of this previously insignificant fish increased from a negligible 369 tonnes in 1995 to a peak of 501,505 tonnes in 2003. Subsequently, the stock showed signs of instability and quotas were reduced, leading to a decline in the catch to 87,121 tonnes in 2010. There have been increased numbers of Atlantic mackerel (the "Miracle of the Mackerel") in the 21st century as the Atlantic Ocean has slightly warmed.

=== Finance ===
==== Banks ====
The Icelandic banking system has been completely overhauled after the 2008 financial crisis. There are now three major commercial banks: Landsbankinn (National Bank since 2008), Arion Bank (formerly Kaupthing Bank) and Islandsbanki (formerly Glitnir), and Kvika banki (formerly MP Straumur). There are smaller banks and some savings banks, however they are not publicly traded.

There has been extensive consolidation of smaller banks, with Sparisjodur Keflavikur being taken over by Landsbanki and Byr being taken over by Islandsbanki. Arion Bank, Islandsbanki, and Kvika Banki are the only banks listed on Iceland Stock Exchange. Arion Bank is mostly owned by foreign creditors while Landsbanki and Islandsbanki are now wholly owned by the State. The ownership stake of the Icelandic State in the banks is managed by Bankasysla rikisins (State Financial Investments), which aims to privatise its shares in the banks in coming years.

==== Stock market ====
Because of historically persistent inflation, historical reliance on fish production and the long-standing public ownership of the commercial banks, equity markets were slow to develop. Nasdaq Iceland, formerly the Iceland Stock Exchange (XICE) was created in 1985. Trading in Icelandic T-Bonds began in 1986 and trading in equities commenced in 1990. All domestic trading in Icelandic companies' shares, bonds and mutual funds takes place on Nasdaq Iceland.

Nasdaq Iceland has used electronic trading systems since its creation. Since 2000, SAXESS, the joint trading system of the NOREX alliance, has been used. There are currently two equities markets on Nasdaq Iceland. The Main Market is the larger and better known of the two. The Alternative Market is a less regulated over-the-counter market. Because of the small size of the market, trading is illiquid in comparison with larger markets. A variety of firms across all sectors of the Icelandic economy are listed on Nasdaq Iceland.

The most important stock market index was the OMX Iceland 15; however, this index was discontinued after the 2008 financial crisis following a decade in which it had been the worst-performing stock market index in the entire world, being "more or less wiped out."

==== Other financial markets ====
Historically, investors tended to be reluctant to hold Icelandic bonds because of the persistence of high inflation and the volatility of the króna. What did exist was largely limited to bonds offered by the central government. The bond market on the ICEX has boomed since the 2010s, however, largely because of the resale of mortgages as housing bonds.

A mutual fund market exists on the ICEX in theory, but no funds are currently listed.

By the end of 2018, Bitcoin mining was expected to consume more electricity in Iceland than all the country's residents combined.

== Data ==
GDP per capita development in Norway, Iceland, Denmark, Sweden and Finland

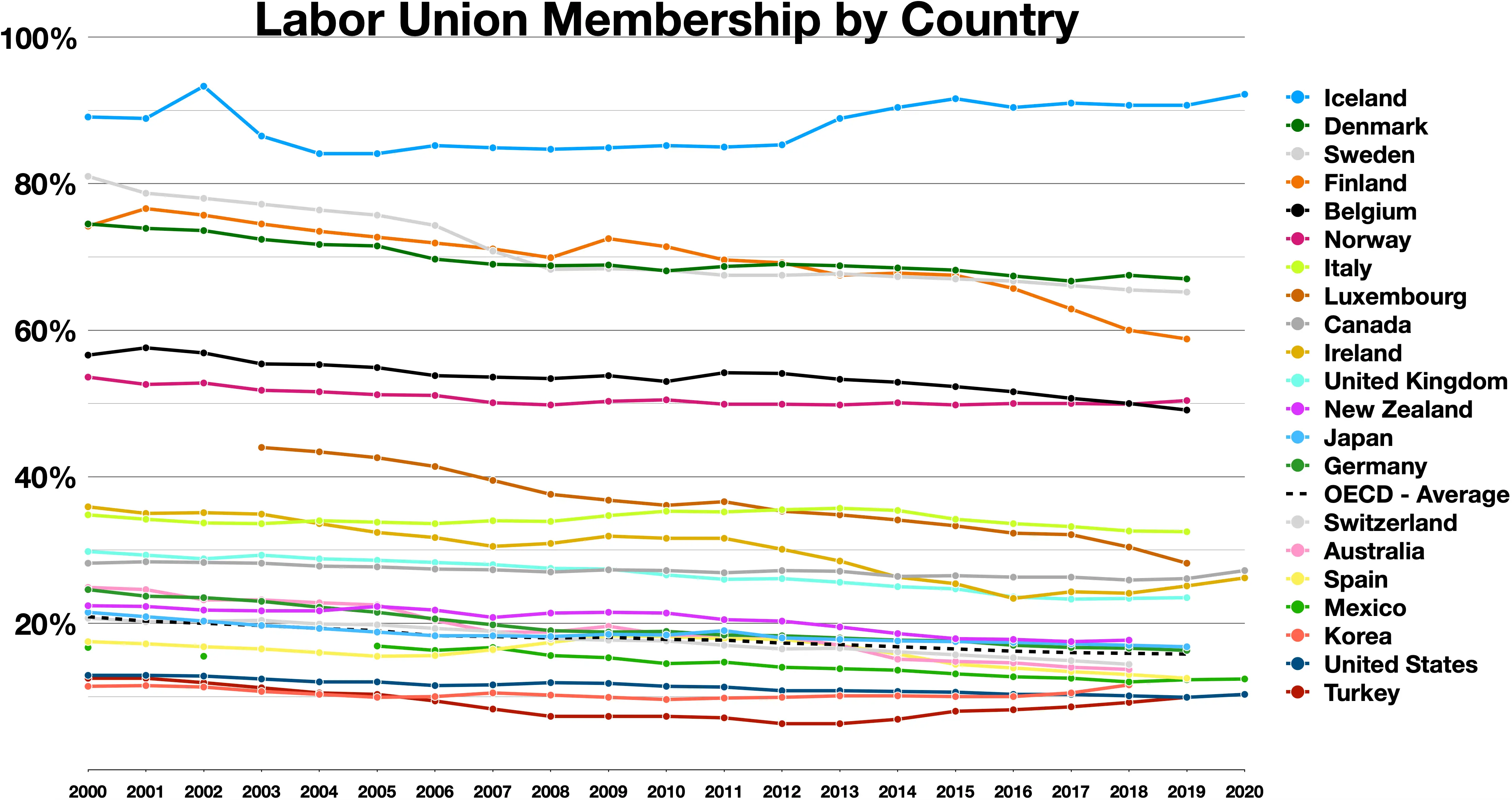
Labor union membership by country

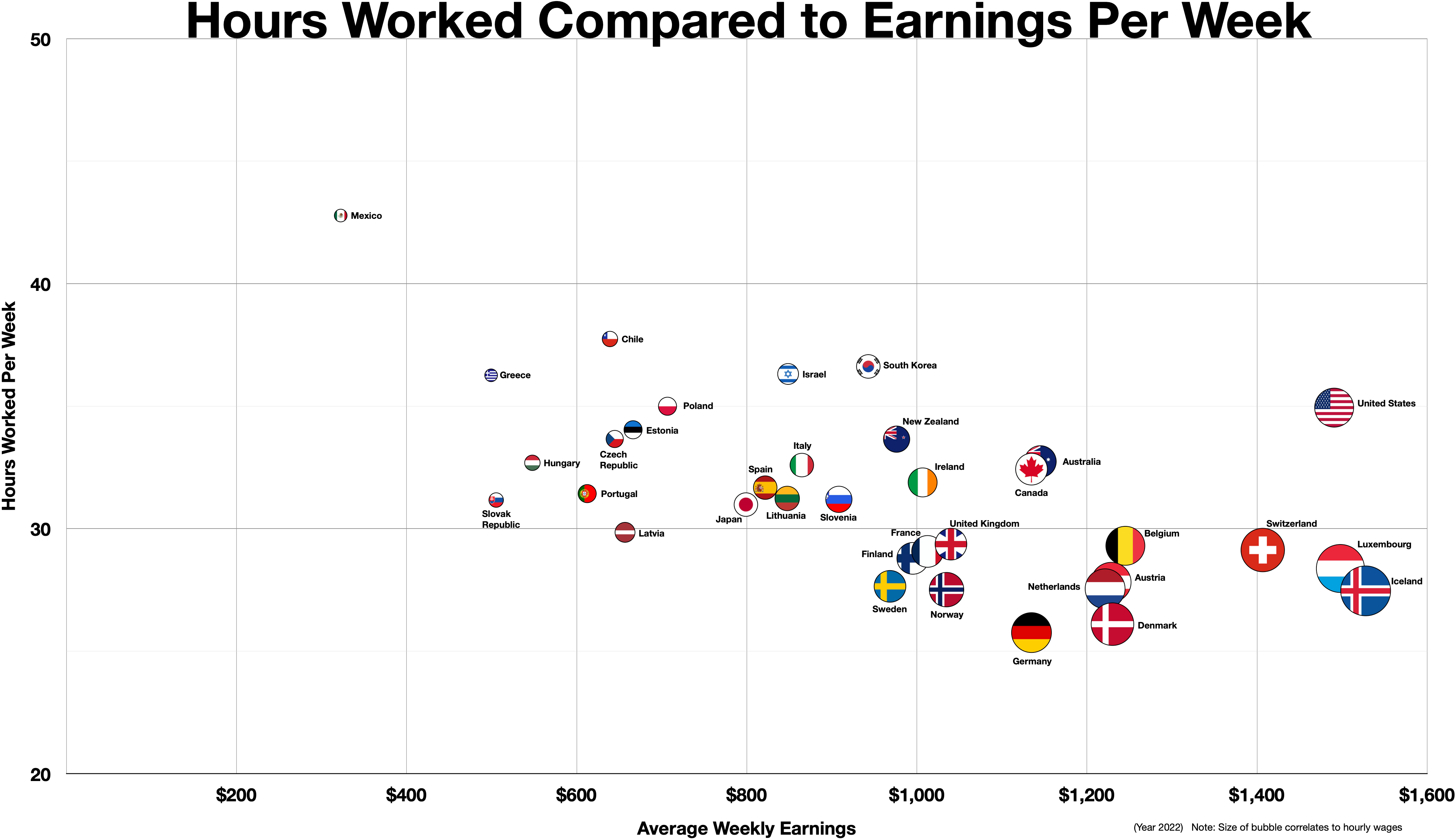
Hours worked compared to earnings per week

The following table shows the main economic indicators in 1980–2025. Inflation under 2% is in green.

Year	GDP (bn. US$ PPP)	GDP per capita (in US$ PPP)	GDP (bn. US$ nominal)	GDP growth (real)	Inflation rate	Unemployment	Government debt (% of GDP)
1980	2.8	12,524	3.5	▲5.7 %	▲58.5 %	0.3 %	n/a
1981	▲3.2	▲14,145	▲3.6	▲4.3 %	▲50.9 %	▲0.4 %	n/a
1982	▲3.5	▲15,154	▼3.3	▲2.2 %	▲51.0 %	▲0.7 %	28.1 %
1983	▲3.6	▲15,190	▼2.9	▼−2.2 %	▲84.3 %	▲1.0 %	▲29.9 %
1984	▲3.9	▲16,190	▲3.0	▲4.1 %	▲29.2 %	▲1.3 %	▲31.6 %
1985	▲4.1	▲17,095	▲3.1	▲3.3 %	▲32.4 %	▼0.9 %	▼31.1 %
1986	▲4.5	▲18,410	▲4.1	▲6.3 %	▲21.3 %	▼0.7 %	▼29.0 %
1987	▲5.0	▲20,315	▲5.7	▲8.5 %	▲18.8 %	▼0.4 %	▼26.5 %
1988	▲5.1	▲20,723	▲6.3	▼−0.1 %	▲25.5 %	▲0.6 %	▲29.6 %
1989	▲5.3	▲21,218	▼5.9	▲0.3 %	▲14.5 %	▲1.7 %	▲34.2 %
1990	▲5.6	▲22,106	▲6.7	▲1.2 %	▲15.5 %	▲2.6 %	▲34.4 %
1991	▲5.8	▲22,617	▲7.2	▼−0.2 %	▲6.8 %	▲2.9 %	▲36.4 %
1992	▼5.7	▼22,020	▲7.3	▼−3.4 %	▲4.0 %	▲4.7 %	▲43.9 %
1993	▲5.9	▲22,606	▼6.4	▲1.3 %	▲4.1 %	▲5.8 %	▲50.6 %
1994	▲6.3	▲23,681	▲6.6	▲3.6 %	▲1.6 %	5.8 %	▲53.0 %
1995	▲6.4	▲24,032	▲7.4	▲0.1 %	▲1.7 %	▼5.3 %	▲56.1 %
1996	▲6.8	▲25,479	▲7.7	▲4.5 %	▲2.3 %	▼4.2 %	▼53.7 %
1997	▲7.2	▲26,800	7.7	▲4.1 %	▲1.8 %	4.2 %	▼51.1 %
1998	▲7.8	▲28,734	▲8.6	▲7.0 %	▲1.7 %	▼3.3 %	▼43.3 %
1999	▲8.2	▲29,911	▲9.1	▲3.9 %	▲3.2 %	▼2.5 %	▲75.5 %
2000	▲8.8	▲31,705	9.1	▲4.9 %	▲5.1 %	▲2.6 %	▼74.8 %
2001	▲9.4	▲33,152	▼8.3	▲3.8 %	▲6.4 %	▲2.8 %	▲82.5 %
2002	▲9.6	▲33,470	▲9.4	▲0.5 %	▲5.2 %	▲3.5 %	▼81.3 %
2003	▲10.0	▲34,680	▲11.6	▲2.3 %	▲2.1 %	3.5 %	▲84.1 %
2004	▲11.1	▲38,050	▲14.0	▲7.6 %	▲3.2 %	▼3.4 %	▼80.1 %
2005	▲12.2	▲41,571	▲17.1	▲7.0 %	▲4.0 %	▼2.9 %	▼67.8 %
2006	▲13.3	▲44,331	▲17.7	▲5.7 %	▲6.7 %	▲3.2 %	▲69.8 %
2007	▲14.8	▲48,259	▲22.0	▲8.7 %	▲5.1 %	▼2.5 %	▼67.4 %
2008	▲15.4	▲48,790	▼18.2	▲1.7 %	▲12.7 %	▲3.3 %	▲109.3 %
2009	▼14.2	▼44,455	▼13.2	▼−8.3 %	▲12.0 %	▲8.0 %	▲128.2 %
2010	▼14.1	▼44,237	▲13.9	▼−2.2 %	▲5.4 %	▲8.3 %	▲131.5 %
2011	▲14.5	▲46,622	▲15.4	▲1.4 %	▲4.0 %	▼8.0 %	▲136.6 %
2012	▲15.0	▲47,840	▼14.9	▲1.2 %	▲5.2 %	▼6.9 %	▼132.2 %
2013	▲15.8	▲49,985	▲16.2	▲3.6 %	▲3.9 %	▼6.1 %	▼121.1 %
2014	▲16.4	▲51,195	▲18.1	▲1.9 %	▲2.0 %	▼5.5 %	▼114.1 %
2015	▲17.1	▲53,069	▼17.7	▲3.8 %	▲1.6 %	▼4.6 %	▼96.3 %
2016	▲18.4	▲56,378	▲21.1	▲6.2 %	▲1.7 %	▼3.4 %	▼81.3 %
2017	▲19.4	▲58,232	▲25.1	▲3.5 %	▲1.8 %	▼3.3 %	▼70.8 %
2018	▲20.5	▲59,895	▲26.7	▲4.7 %	▲2.7 %	▼3.1 %	▼62.3 %
2019	▲22.1	▲63,215	▼25.0	▲1.1 %	▲3.0 %	▲3.9 %	▲65.7 %
2020	▼20.8	▼58,835	▼22.0	▼−6.6 %	▲2.8 %	▲6.3 %	▲76.1 %
2021	▲23.5	▲65,517	▲26.2	▲5.2 %	▲4.5 %	▼5.8 %	▼73.6 %
2022	▲27.4	▲75,028	▲29.2	▲8.9 %	▲8.3 %	▼3.6 %	▼66.4 %
2023	▲29.9	▲79,645	▲31.7	▲5.2 %	▲8.7 %	▼3.4 %	▼61.6 %
2024	▲30.4	▼79,155	▲33.2	▼−0.9 %	▲5.9 %	3.4 %	▼60.5 %
2025	▲31.5	▲80,915	▲38.5	▲1.1 %	▲4.1 %	▲4.3 %	▼56.7 %

== External trade ==
Exports of Iceland by product category (2019) Chemical products Transportation Machines Mineral products Plastics and rubbers Metals Foodstuffs Precious metals Textiles Instruments Animal products Vegetable products Paper goods Footwear and headwear Miscellaneous Stone and glass Wood products Animal and vegetable bi-products Animal hides Arts and antiques Weapons

Iceland's economy is highly export-driven. Marine products account for the majority of goods exports. Other important exports include aluminium, ferro-silicon alloys, machinery and electronic equipment for the fishing industry, software, woollen goods. Most of Iceland's exports go to the European Union (EU) and European Free Trade Association (EFTA) countries, the United States, and Japan. The 2020 value of Iceland's exports was $7.43 billion FOB.

The main imports are machinery and equipment, petroleum products, foodstuffs and textiles. Cement is Iceland's most imported product. The total 2020 value of imports was $7.55 billion. In 2019, Iceland's primary import partner was Norway (11%), followed by the Netherlands (10%), Germany (8%), Denmark (8%), United States (7%), United Kingdom (6%), PRC China (6%), and Sweden (5%). Most agricultural products are subject to high tariffs; the import of some products, such as uncooked meat, is greatly restricted for phyto-sanitary reasons.

Iceland's relatively liberal trading policy has been strengthened by accession to the European Economic Area in 1993 and by the Uruguay Round, which also brought significantly improved market access for Iceland's exports, particularly seafood products. However, the agricultural sector remains heavily subsidized and protected; some tariffs range as high as 700%.

The fishing industry is one of the most important industries. It provides 40% of export income and employs 7.0% of the workforce; therefore, the state of the economy remains sensitive to world prices for fish products.

When corrected for the dramatic depreciation of the Icelandic króna in 2008 (approximately 50% against the euro and US dollar), imports since the 2007 peak have been negative.

=== Imports ===
Year	Millions (ISK)	Change
1988	68,723.2	0.00%
1989	80,599.4	▲17.28%
1990	96,620.7	▲19.88%
1991	104,129.1	▲7.77%
1992	96,895.3	▼6.95%
1993	91,306.6	▼5.77%
1994	102,541.3	▲12.30%
1995	113,613.6	▲10.80%
1996	135,994.5	▲19.70%
1997	143,226.6	▲5.32%
1998	176,072.1	▲22.93%
1999	182,321.5	▲3.55%
2000	203,222.1	▲11.46%

Source: Statistics Iceland (statice.is)

Year	Millions (ISK)	Change
2001	220,874.0	▲8.69%
2002	207,607.5	▼6.01%
2003	216,525.1	▲4.30%
2004	260,430.8	▲20.28%
2005	313,854.6	▲20.51%
2006	437,086.3	▲39.26%
2007	429,468.9	▼1.74%
2008	514,739.3	▲19.86%
2009	446,128.2	▼13.33%
2010	477,222.3	▲6.97%
2011	561,626.1	▲17.69%
2012	597,262.2	▲6.35%

=== Exports ===
Year	Millions (ISK)	Change
1988	61,600.0	0.00%
1989	80,071.7	▲29.85%
1990	92,625.1	▲15.68%
1991	91,560.4	▼1.15%
1992	87,832.8	▼4.07%
1993	94,657.6	▲7.77%
1994	112,653.8	▲19.01%
1995	116,606.7	▲3.51%
1996	126,303.8	▲8.32%
1997	131,213.2	▲3.89%
1998	136,592.0	▲4.10%
1999	144,928.1	▲6.10%
2000	149,272.8	▲3.00%

Year	Millions (ISK)	Change
2001	196,582.2	▲31.69%
2002	204,303.0	▲3.93%
2003	182,580.0	▼10.63%
2004	202,373.0	▲10.84%
2005	194,355.3	▼3.96%
2006	242,740.0	▲24.90%
2007	305,095.8	▲25.69%
2008	466,859.5	▲53.02%
2009	500,854.5	▲7.28%
2010	561,032.2	▲12.02%
2011	620,127.4	▲10.53%
2012	633,029.1	▲2.08%

== Economic agreements and policies ==
Iceland became a full European Free Trade Association member in 1970 and entered into a free trade agreement with the European Community in 1973. Under the agreement on a European Economic Area, effective January 1, 1994, there is basically free cross-border movement of capital, labor, goods, and services between Iceland, Norway, Lichtenstein, and the EU countries. However, many of Iceland's political parties remain opposed to EU membership, primarily because of Icelanders' concern about losing control over their fishing resources. Iceland also has bilateral free trade agreements with several countries outside the EEA. The most extensive of these is the Hoyvík Agreement between Iceland and the Faroe Islands, this agreement goes even further than the EEA agreement by establishing free trade in agricultural products between the nations. Iceland and China signed a free trade agreement on 15 April 2013, the first such agreement China made with a western country. Iceland has a free trade agreement with Mexico on November 27, 2000.

== Currency and monetary policy ==
The currency of Iceland is the króna (plural: krónur), issued exclusively by the Central Bank of Iceland since the bank's founding in 1961.

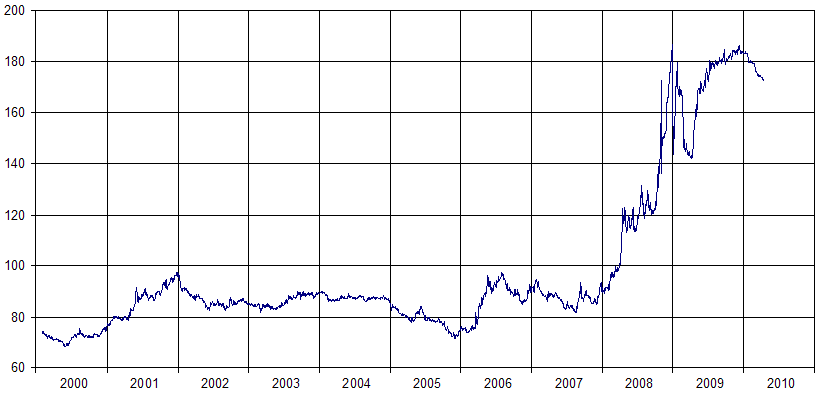
Exchange rate for the krona to the euro from 2000 to mid-2010

During the 1970s the oil shocks (1973 and 1979 energy crisis) hit Iceland hard. Inflation rose to 43% in 1974 and 59% in 1980, falling to 15% in 1987 but rising to 30% in 1988. Iceland experienced moderately strong GDP growth (3% on average) from 1995 to 2004. Growth slowed between 2000 and 2002, but the economy expanded by 4.3% in 2003 and grew by 6.2% in 2004. Growth in 2005 exceeded 6%. Inflation averaged merely 1.5% from 1993 to 1994, and only 1.7% from 1994 to 1995. Inflation over 2006 topped at 8.6%, with a rate of 6.9% as of January 2007. Standard & Poor's reduced their rating for Iceland to AA− from A+ (long term) in December 2006, following a loosening of fiscal policy by the Icelandic government ahead of the 2007 elections. Foreign debt rose to more than five times the value of Iceland's GDP, and Iceland's Central Bank raised short-term interest rates to nearly 15% in 2007. Due to the plunging currency against the euro and dollar, in 2008 inflation was speculated to be at 20-25%.

Inflation increased during the 2008–2011 Icelandic financial crisis, and the Central Bank of Iceland pegged the krona's value to the euro at increasingly higher and higher rates in an attempt to keep the currency stable, eventually pegging it at 340 kronur per euro before all trade in the currency was suspended. The krona similarly fell in value against the US dollar, going from around 50–80 per dollar to about 110–115 per dollar. By November 2008, it had continued to lower to 135 to the dollar. By early April 2009, the value hovered around 119 per dollar, roughly maintaining that value over the next two years. The currency has stabilised since the crisis, with 1 US$ being worth 137.22 Icelandic kronur in September 2024.

Despite being heavily integrated into European Union via the European Economic Area (EEA) and the Schengen Agreement, Iceland does not use the euro. Then-Deputy Governor of the Central Bank of Iceland, Arnór Sighvatsson, said that Iceland would not adopt the euro "as it entails extra cost of purchase of new base money for the banking system and larger precautionary foreign exchange reserves.

== Growth ==
Iceland's economy had been diversifying into manufacturing and service industries in the 1990s, and new developments in software production, biotechnology, insurance and other financial advisory services were taking place. The tourism sector was also expanding, with the recent trends in ecotourism and whale watching. However, in 2008, the Icelandic economy entered a deep recession during the Great Recession. Although Iceland's economy grew 3.3% during the last quarter of 2009, the overall contraction in GDP over 2009 was 6.5%, less than the 10% originally forecasted by the IMF.

== See also ==
- List of companies of Iceland
- List of Icelandic brands
- Accession of Iceland to the European Union
