= OMX Iceland 8 =

Stock market index

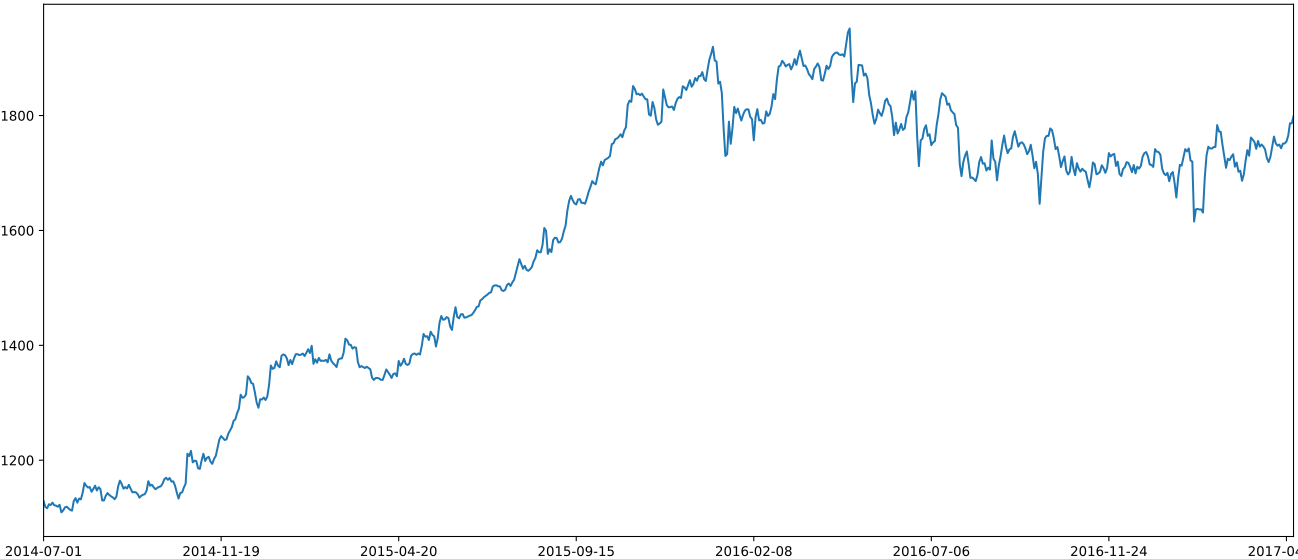
Value of the OMX Iceland 8 over time.

OMX Iceland 8 (OMXI8) was the name of a stock market index for the eight largest and most traded stocks listed on the Nasdaq Iceland stock exchange, between July 2014 and June 2019.

The OMX Iceland 6 index was renamed to OMX Iceland 8 when the index was expanded from six to eight stocks on 1 July 2014. Five years later, on 1 July 2019, the index was updated to OMX Iceland 10.

== Composition ==
The OMX Iceland 8 index constituents from the review effective on 2 January 2019 (the last semi-annual review before the index was updated to OMX Iceland 10):

Company	Symbol	GICS sector
Eik Fasteignafélag	EIK	Real Estate
Festi	FESTI	Consumer Discretionary
Hagar	HAGA	Consumer Staples
Icelandair Group	ICEAIR	Industrials
Marel	MAREL	Industrials
Reginn	REGINN	Real Estate
Reitir Fasteignafélag	REITIR	Real Estate
Síminn	SIMINN	Communication Services
