= Endre Røsjø =

Norwegian investment banker based in London

- Born: August 31, 1944 (age 82); Oslo, Norway
- Education: Harvard University (MBA, 1970)
- Occupation: Investment banker
- Years active: 1970–present
- Employer(s): Maritime and Merchant Bank ASA; Centennial AS; Pinemont Securities Ltd
- Known for: Chairman of Maritime and Merchant Bank ASA

Endre Røsjø (born 31 August 1944 in Oslo) is a Norwegian investment banker based in London. He holds an MBA with distinction from Harvard University (1970).

== Career ==
Røsjø is Chairman of Maritime and Merchant Bank ASA (MMBank.no) and Centennial AS, (centennial.no) both of Oslo, Norway, as well as of Pinemont Securities Ltd, London, UK, a member of the London Stock Exchange and regulated by the FCA. The family firm Centennial AS reported solid results 28/8/2019 (Finansavisen 28/8/19 page 7) His first job was a consultancy arrangement with Citibank, New York, reporting to John Reed. Was responsible for introducing automation in the Swiss branches. Built and ran Kingsford Shipping company alongside the old UK shipbroker C.H.Rugg & Co based in the Baltic Exchange building which was bombed by the IRA. Adviser to the MOD during the Falklands War. Requisitioning non-military ships and providing war insurance risk value on same In the early 1980s Røsjø was involved with the American oil industry, including a profitable turnaround of Bluebell Oil and Gas Inc. in Oklahoma. After 2003, he was the originator of the oil industry in Kurdistan/North Iraq arranging a groundbreaking deal between the KRG and Norsk Hydro ASA. The Tawke oil field was taken over by DnO ASA after a panicked decision by the Ceo of Norsk Hydro to cancel all Middle East oil contracts.

Was part of the controlling shareholder group of Westside National Bank and Pinemont Bank, both in Texas. Together with Kinnevik/Jan Stenbeck he started Millicom and a very successful Norwegian commercial radio station, Radio P4, with branches in Cape Town and Durban. As Chairman he took the company public on the Oslo Stock Exchange.

In order to help the economy of Iceland, he invested ISK 20 billion in 2011. Together with shipowners Henning Oldendorff and Arne Blystad, Endre Røsjø started Maritime and Merchant Bank ASA, a fully licensed Norwegian bank, which is turning profitable in its second year**

In his youth, Røsjø was the leader of the Young Conservatives Association in Bergen, Norway. He worked for his father's accounting firm as a consultant and was a salaried cavalry sergeant during the summer holidays.
