= Lára Jóhannsdóttir =

Icelandic academic

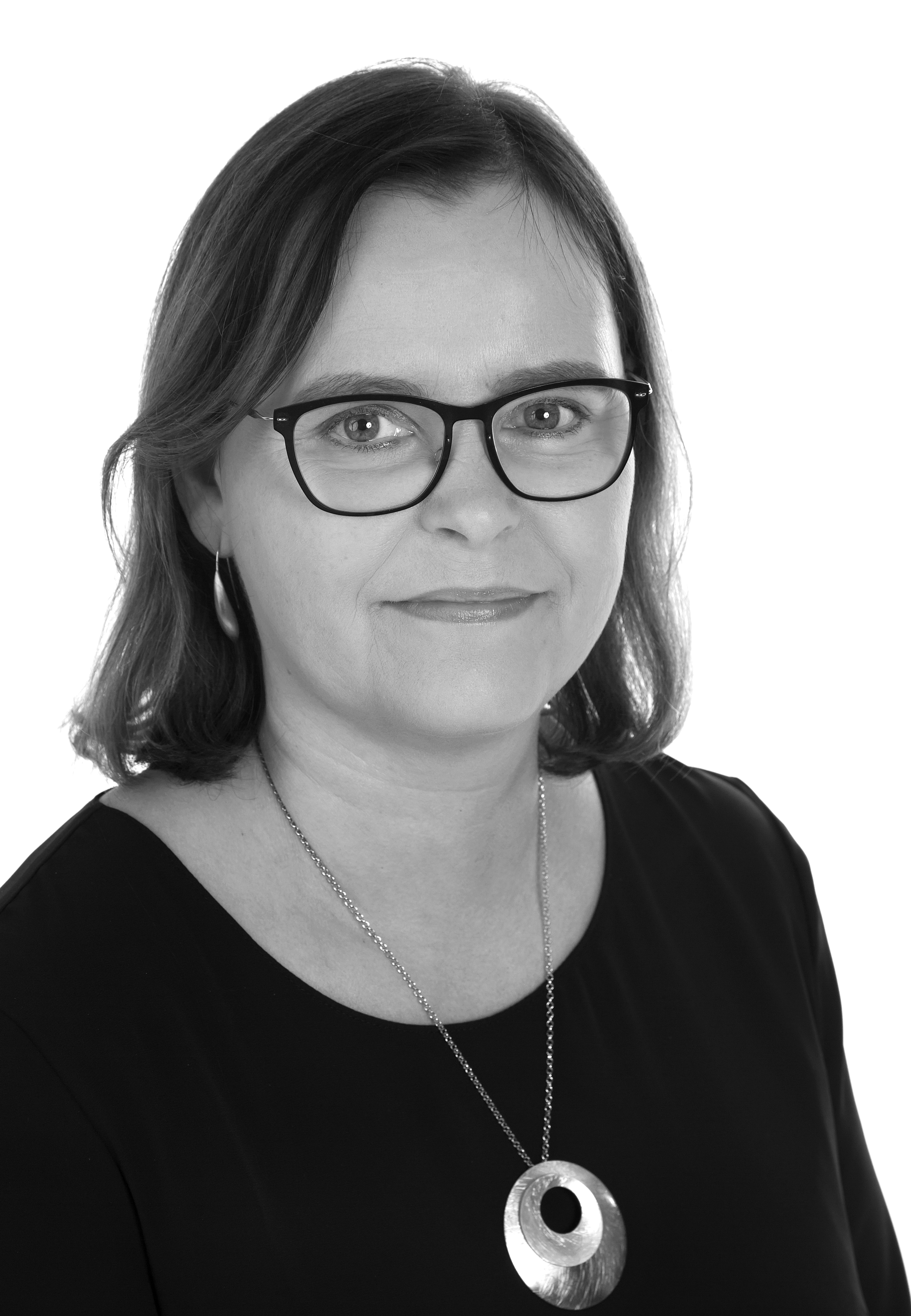
- Occupations: Professor within the Environment and Natural Resources (ENR) Graduate Programme, but she sits within the Faculty of Business Administration at the University of Iceland

Lára Jóhannsdóttir is a professor in the Faculty of Business Administration at the University of Iceland. She is also a member of the faculty in the Environment and Natural Resources (ENR) Graduate Programme, an interdisciplinary program with ties to all five Schools of the University, but administratively part of the School of Engineering and Natural Sciences. Lára was the academic director of the ENR Programme in 2019, and is the first female professor in the faculty of Business Administration.

== Academic background ==
Lára graduated in 1981 from the Social Sciences Department of the Comprehensive School in Breiðholt (Fjölbrautaskólinn í Breiðholti) in Reykjavík. In 1990, she graduated with a degree from the Preliminary Studies Department of the Co-operative University of Iceland (Samvinnuháskólinn á Bifröst), now Bifröst University. In 1992, she received a degree in Business Administration from the same school. In 2007, Lára completed an MBA in Global Management from the Thunderbird School of Global Management, now part of Arizona State University. Lára also studied in the Czech Republic, Switzerland, Russia, China and the United States. In 2012, Lára became the first woman to finish a PhD from the University of Iceland's Faculty of Business Administration.

Lára was an assistant professor in Environment and Natural Resources, 2014 to 2017, an associate professor from 2017 to 2018, and professor since 2018.

== Research ==
Lára's research involves, in the broadest sense, corporate sustainability, corporate social responsibility (CSR), in particular focusing on the role and responsibility of financial institution, such as insurance companies, responsible investments, environmental and climate change issues as well as Arctic affairs. The title of her doctoral dissertation is “Nordic non-life insurers’ interest in, and response to, environmental issues” (in Icelandic "Áhugi og framlag norrænna skaðatryggingafélaga til lausna umhverfislegra vandamála"). The research builds on interview data from 80 directors and specialists from 16 insurance companies, working in the Åland Islands, the Faroe Islands, Iceland, Denmark, Finland, Norway, and Sweden. Each individual company is amongst the 2-4 biggest insurance companies in their home country. The research revealed considerable differences between case groups, e.g., insurance companies in island communities, versus those in Denmark, Finland, Norway and Sweden, as to measures and lack of measures, positions on environmental affairs, and factors enabling or hindering the companies from coming to grips with environmental affairs.

Lára participate in a collaborative project on Arctic studies, the Fulbright Arctic Initiative (FAI), from 2018 to 2019, the Fulbright Institute's flagship for Arctic research. This involved an 18-month project, with the participation of 16 scholars and scientists from the Arctic Council states, under supervision of two lead scholars. Two workgroups were operating, each with its own scope of emphasis, namely resilient societies and sustainable economies. Lára participated in the latter group. Lára's research project involved the role of insurance companies in economic development in the Arctic region. During the project, Lára lived and engaged in research at Dartmouth College in New Hampshire, USA.

In 2021, with the influence of COVID-19, Lára and David proposed effective measures that can mitigate potential risks in a future pandemic around the world.

== Management and specialist jobs ==
Lára has performed various management jobs within the University of Iceland. For example, she has been on the Board of the Institute of Business Administration, chaired the Sustainability and Environment Committee, directed the School of Social Sciences Expert Panel for evaluating grant applications and served as a board member of the University of Iceland Research Fund, allocating grants from University of Iceland's Research Fund.

Lára has extensive professional experience from the business community. For example, she worked for 14 years (1992–2006) as a specialist and executive within the insurance sector in Iceland. From 2011 to 2019 she was on the Board of the Employees' Pension Fund of the Agricultural Bank of Iceland (LSBÍ), now Arion banki. In addition, she was on the auditing and loan committees.

In the financial sector as well as academia, Lára has given many talks, held courses, and published articles on business, wellbeing at work, corporate social responsibility, corporate governance, environmental and climate change, the Paris Agreement, sustainability, and Arctic affairs. She has published articles in Frjáls verslun, Fréttablaðið, Markaður Fréttablaðið, Morgunblaðið, Vikuspegill Morgunblaðið, Viðskiptablað Morgunblaðið, Vísir, and Lífeyrismál.is. State Radio's “Spegillinn” has also discussed Lára's research.

Lára was active in LeiðtogaAuður (“Leader Auður”) as well as the Association of Businesswomen in Iceland (Félag kvenna í atvinnulífinu) and was in a group of women offering to take seats on the boards of directors of Iceland's biggest companies. She has also served on the selection committee of the City of Reykjavík and Festa, a centre for social corporate responsibility, that decides Climate Award recipients.

== Acknowledgements ==
- In addition, a Canadian company, Renewable Energy Global Innovations, discussed an article by Lára Jóhannsdóttir, et al., Insurers' role in enhancing development and utilization of environmentally sound technologies: A case study of Nordic insurers, which considers the most notable developments in energy research, calling it a key scientific article.
- Lára was invited to be one of the guest editors of a special edition of the Journal of Cleaner Production on sustainable business models, published in 2018.
- Lára has received various research, academic and project grants, including a grant from Landsvirkjun (National Power Company of Iceland) (2009), Reykjavík Energy's Environment and Energy Research Fund (2010), Pálmi Jónasson's Conservation Fund (2010), Alcan's Social Fund (2009), and the Iceland Chamber of Commerce Research Fund (2016).
- Lára was involved in and directed various award-winning projects while she worked in the insurance sector. ItShe received the Icelandic Quality Award and the Keeping Work-Life Balance Award (Lóð á vogaskálina), which recognises contributions promoting harmony between work and private life in words and deeds.

== Personal life ==
Lára's parents are Jóhann H. Haraldsson, electrician, (f. 1938) and Erla Elínborg Sigurðardóttir, housewife and female worker (1931–1996). Lára is married to Páll Ágúst Ásgeirsson, mechanical engineer. They have one son; previously, Lára had a son, and Páll Ágúst had two children.

== Main writings ==
Articles

- Cook, D., Saviolidis, N. M., Davidsdottir, B., Johannsdottir, L. & Olafsson, S. (2017). Measuring countries’ environmental sustainability performance—The development of a nation-specific indicator set. Ecological Indicators, Vol. 74(2017), p. 463-478. https://doi.org/10.1016/j.ecolind.2016.12.009
- Dentchev, N., et al. (2016). Embracing the variety of sustainable business models: Social Entrepreneurship, Corporate Intrapreneurship, Creativity, Innovation, and other approaches to sustainability challenges. Journal of Cleaner Production. Vol. 113 (2016), p. 1-4.
- Dentchev, N., et al. (2018). Embracing the variety of sustainable business models: A prolific field of research and a future research agenda. Journal of Cleaner Production [Sérhefti], Vol. 194(1 (September)), p. 695-703, doi: 10.1016/j.jclepro.2018.05.156.
- Johannsdottir, L. Olafsson, S., & Davidsdottir, B. (2015). Leadership role and employee acceptance of change: implementing environmental sustainability strategies within Nordic insurance companies. Journal of Organizational Change Management, 28(1). https://doi.org/10.1108/JOCM-12-2013-0238
- Latapí Agudelo, M. A., Johannsdottir, L., & Davidsdottir, B. (2019). Literature Review of the History and Evolution of Corporate Social Responsibility, International Journal of Corporate Social Responsibility, (2019) 4:1 https://doi.org/10.1186/s40991-018-0039-y.

Books

Corporate Social Responsibility in the Arctic - The New Frontiers of Business, Management, and Enterprise, 2021
