= Síldarvinnslan =

Icelandic seafood company

Síldarvinnslan hf.
- Type: Hlutafélag
- Traded as: Nasdaq Nordic: SVN
- Industry: Fishing
- Headquarters: Neskaupstaður, Iceland
- Area served: Worldwide
- Key people: Gunnþór Ingvason (CEO); Þorsteinn Már Baldvinsson (Chairman)
- Products: Fishing, fish processing, fish meal, fish oil
- Operating income: ▲USD 93.5 million (2025)
- Net income: ▲USD 81.3 million (2025)
- Total assets: ▲USD 1,111.6 million (2025)
- Total equity: ▲USD 734.8 million (2025)
- Number of employees: 646 (Yearly average throughout 2025)
- Subsidiaries: See text
- Website: www.svn.is

Síldarvinnslan hf. (commonly referred to simply as Síldarvinnslan) is an Icelandic multinational company involved in various fish related activities, including fishing, fish processing, distribution and sales of fish products. It is among the largest fishing companies in Iceland and is publicly traded on the Nasdaq Iceland stock exchange, where it is a component of the OMX Iceland 15 index.

== Ownership ==
At the end of the year 2025, Síldarvinnslan had 2,592 shareholders, with the top 10 shareholders owning 83,2% of the shares. Síldarvinnslan hf. owned 0,01% of its own shares.

At the end of the year 2025, the largest shareholders were:

Shareholder name	Entity type	Percentage
Samherji hf.	Fishing company	30.06%
Kjálkanes hf.	Holding company	16.06%
Gildi - lífeyrissjóður	Pension fund	10.52%
Samvinnufélag útgerðamanna	Cooperative society	10.10%
Eignarhaldsfélagið Snæfugl ehf.	Holding company	3.46%
Lífeyrissjóður verslunarmanna	Pension fund	3.27%
Brú lífeyrissjóður starfsmanna sveitarfélaga	Pension fund	2.95%
Lífeyrissjóður starfsmanna ríkisins A-deild	Pension fund	2.75%
Stapi lífeyrissjóður	Pension fund	2.59%
Almenni lífeyrissjóðurinn	Pension fund	1.44%
Others	N/A	16.79%

== See also ==
- Brim hf.
- Samherji hf.
