= Jóhannsdóttir =

Jóhannsdóttir is an Icelandic patronym. In Icelandic names, it is not a family name. Notable people with the name include:

- Alexandra Jóhannsdóttir (born 2000), Icelandic footballer
- Lára Jóhannsdóttir (born 1961), Icelandic academic
- Margrét Jóhannsdóttir (born 1995), Icelandic badminton player
- Margrét Helga Jóhannsdóttir (1940–2026), Icelandic actress
- Ólafía Jóhannsdóttir (1863–1924), Icelandic teacher and temperance worker
