= Lífeyrissjóður starfsmanna ríkisins =

Icelandic seafood company

Lífeyrissjóður starfsmanna ríkisins (LSR)
- Type: Pension fund
- Industry: Pension fund
- Headquarters: Reykjavík, Iceland
- Area served: Iceland
- Key people: Harpa Jónsdóttir (CEO); Jökull Heiðdal Úlfsson (Chairman)
- Products: Public pension fund, personal pension fund, mortgage lending
- Total assets: ▲ISK 1,663.9 billion (2025)
- Subsidiaries: A-Division; B-Division; Personal Pension Division
- Website: www.lsr.is

Lífeyrissjóður starfsmanna ríkisins (Pension Fund of the Icelandic Government) commonly referred to as LSR, is an Icelandic pension fund which manages the pensions of national government employees. In 2025, it had 32,196 workers paying into the fund and 27,044 retirees receiving a pension totalling 117.6 billion ISK.

== Assets ==
According to LSR's annual report in 2025, the fund's portfolio included the following investment categories:

| Investment Category | Percentage |
|---|---|
| Icelandic Government Bonds | 16.5% |
| Mortgage-Backed Securities | 13.1% |
| Foreign Bonds | 2.9% |
| Bonds - Other | 7.4% |
| Liquid Funds | 3.4% |
| Icelandic Stocks | 15.3% |
| Foreign Stocks | 41.4% |

=== Icelandic Bonds ===
The top 10 biggest Icelandic bond positions in 2025 were the following:

| Issuer | ISK billions | Percentage |
|---|---|---|
| Icelandic Treasury (Ríkissjóður Íslands) | 169.2 | 36.0% |
| Icelandic Student Loan Fund (Lánasjóður Íslenskra námsmanna) | 53.8 | 11.4% |
| Íslandsbanki hf. | 23.2 | 4.9% |
| Landsbankinn hf. | 19.9 | 4.2% |
| Lánasjóður sveitarfélaga ohf. (Municipality Credit Iceland Plc. (MCI)) | 18.0 | 3.8% |
| Reitir fasteignafélag hf. | 17.8 | 3.8% |
| Heimar hf. | 17.2 | 3.7% |
| Reykjavíkurborg | 14.0 | 3.0% |
| Eik fasteignafélag hf. | 11.3 | 2.4% |
| Orkuveita Reykjavíkur (Reykjavík Energy) | 10.8 | 2.3% |
| Others (estimated from the residual) | Not stated | 24.5% |

=== Icelandic Stocks ===
The top 10 biggest Icelandic stock positions in 2025 were the following:

| Company name | ISK billions | Percentage |
|---|---|---|
| Arion banki hf. | 26.5 | 11.3% |
| JBT Marel Corporation | 26.3 | 11.3% |
| Íslandsbanki hf. | 23.4 | 10.0% |
| Brim hf. | 23.4 | 10.0% |
| Hagar hf. | 17.1 | 7.3% |
| Festi hf. | 12.1 | 5.2% |
| Reitir fasteignafélag hf. | 8.9 | 3.8% |
| Kvika banki hf. | 8.2 | 3.5% |
| Embla medical hf. | 7.3 | 3.1% |
| Heimar hf. | 6.9 | 3.0% |
| Others (estimated from the residual) | Not stated | 31.5% |

=== Asset managers ===
Lífeyrissjóður starfsmanna ríkisins does not list its top 10 biggest foreign stock positions, but it lists the top 10 foreign asset managers in 2025, which were the following:

| Asset Manager | ISK billions | Percentage |
|---|---|---|
| Storebrand Asset Management AS | 93.6 | 16.9% |
| Vanguard Group | 85.1 | 15.4% |
| Morgan Stanley | 69.1 | 12.5% |
| State Street Global Markets | 63.8 | 11.5% |
| Wellington Management Company | 50.5 | 9.1% |
| T. Rowe Price | 42.5 | 7.7% |
| MFS Investment Funds | 32.7 | 5.9% |
| JP Morgan Asset Management | 31.1 | 5.6% |
| Janus Henderson Investors | 20.3 | 3.7% |
| Seilern Investment Management | 16.9 | 3.0% |
| Others (estimated from the residual) | Not stated | 8.7% |

== See also ==
- Pensions in Iceland
