= Ásgeir Jónsson =

Icelandic economist, teacher and author (born 1970)

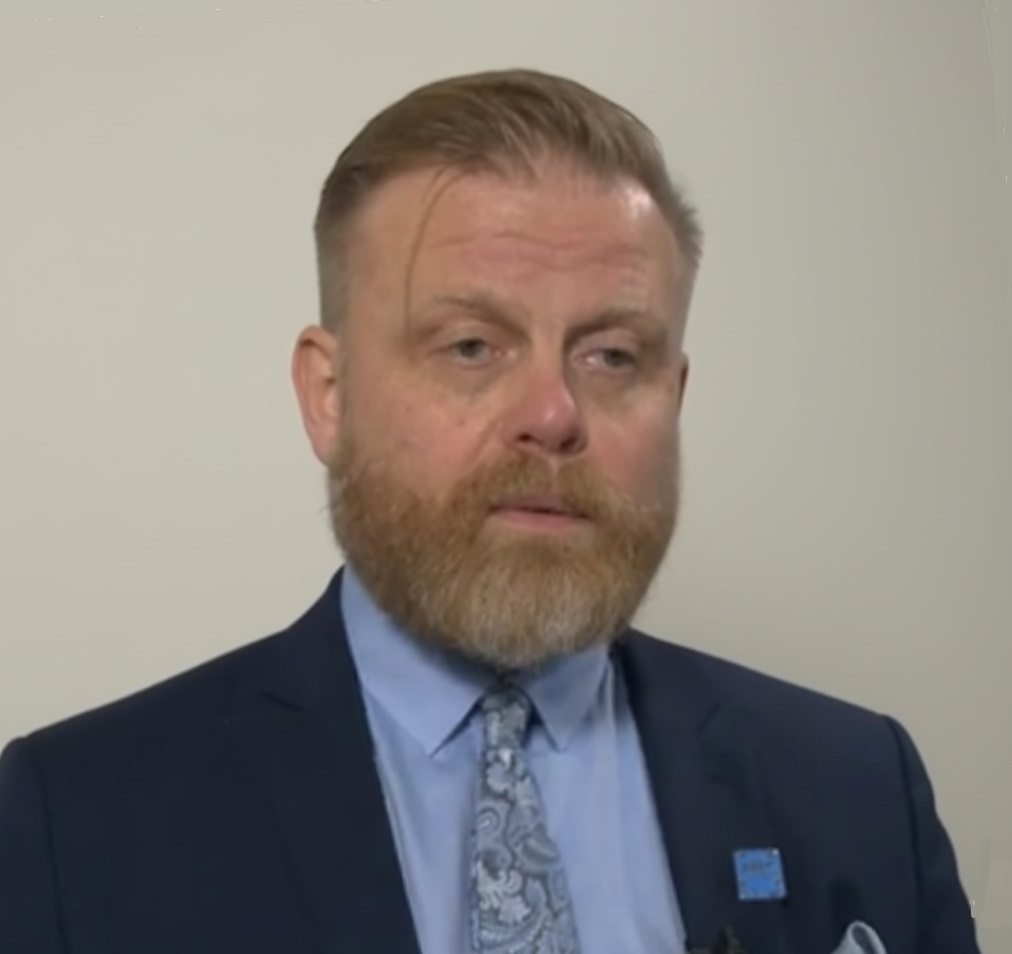

Governor of the Central Bank of Iceland

Personal details
- Parent: Jón Bjarnason (father)
- Education: University of Iceland; Indiana University
- Occupation: economist; professor; author
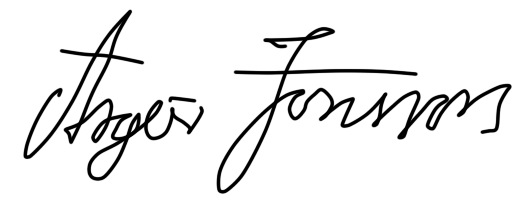
- Signature

Ásgeir Jónsson (born 21 June 1970) is an Icelandic economist, teacher and author. He has been a notable contributor to the Icelandic policy debate during the boom and crisis periods. He is the son of Jón Bjarnason, Minister of Agriculture and Fisheries (2009-2011). He is the current governor of the Central Bank of Iceland.

== Career ==
Currently, Associate Professor of Economics at the University of Iceland and an economic adviser at Virðing. During the 2000s Ásgeir was the Chief economist for Kaupthing Bank and head of its analytic department. After the Icelandic banking collapse he wrote a book on the crisis. In July 2019, he was appointed the governor of the Central Bank of Iceland.

== Education ==
Ásgeir received a BS degree in economics from the University of Iceland in 1994. He received the M.Sc. degree in economics from Indiana University in 1997 and the PhD degree from the same university in 2001.

== Policy debate ==
Jón Daníelsson and Ásgeir (2005) addressed a problem in monetary policy associated with an appreciation of the exchange rate for the purpose of price stability which could perversely lead to increased financial instability by reducing the amount of regulatory capital. To counter this they suggested requiring bank capital arising from foreign currency lending to be denominated in the same foreign currency. Capital charges on bank lending would then also make monetary policy more effective as a counter-cyclical policy tool.

== Personal life ==
Ásgeir is the son of Jón Bjarnason, the former Icelandic Ministry of Fisheries and Agriculture, and Ingibjörg Kolka Bergsteinsdóttir.

Preceded by Már Guðmundsson	Governor of the Central Bank; 2019–present	Incumbent
