= OMX Iceland 15 =

Stock market index

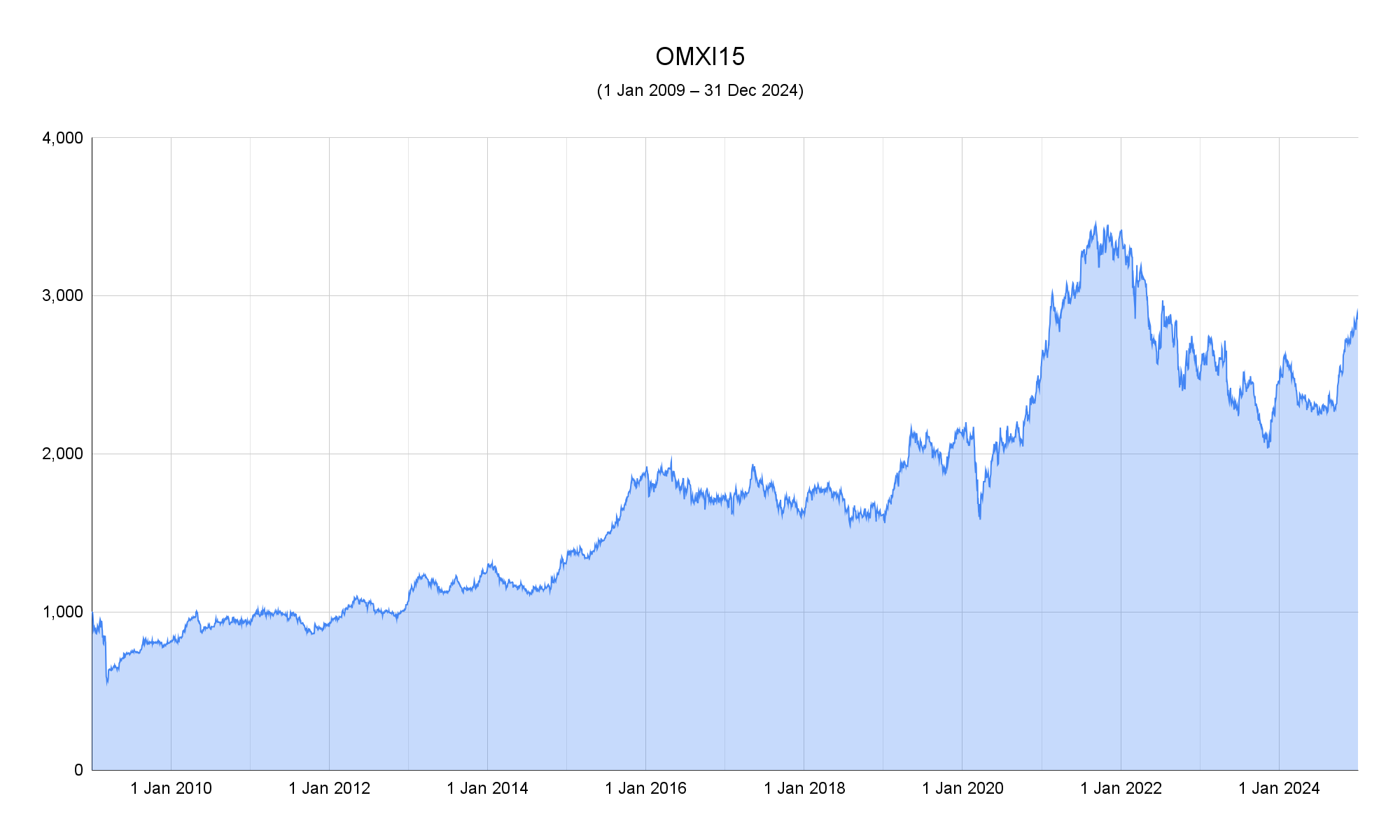
- OMXI15 index performance between 2009 and 2024
- Foundation: 2 January 2009 (current index)
- Operator: Nasdaq, Inc.
- Exchanges: Nasdaq Iceland
- Constituents: 15
- Weighting method: Capitalization-weighted
- Website: Official website
- ISIN: IS0000018885
- Reuters: .OMXI15

The OMX Iceland 15 (OMXI15, formerly OMXI10, OMXI8 and OMXI6) is a stock market index for the largest and most traded stocks on the Nasdaq Iceland stock exchange. It is a price return and capitalization-weighted index. The base date for the index is 31 December 2008, with a base value of 1,000.

The index is reconstituted and rebalanced semi-annually on the first trading day in January and July. There is also a total return version of the OMX Iceland 15 index, the OMX Iceland 15 Gross Index (OMXI15GI). Unlike the regular OMXI15 index, the OMXI15GI includes reinvested dividends.

== Components ==
As of February 2026, the index is composed of the following 15 listings.

| Company | Symbol | GICS sector |
|---|---|---|
| Alvotech | ALVO | Health Care |
| Amaroq Minerals | AMRQ | Materials |
| Arion Bank | ARION | Financials |
| Eimskipafélag Íslands | EIM | Industrials |
| Festi | FESTI | Consumer Discretionary |
| Hagar | HAGA | Consumer Staples |
| Heimar | HEIMAR | Real Estate |
| Icelandair Group | ICEAIR | Industrials |
| Íslandsbanki | ISB | Financials |
| JBT Marel | JBTM | Industrials |
| Kvika Banki | KVIKA | Financials |
| Oculis | OCS | Health Care |
| Reitir Fasteignafélag | REITIR | Real Estate |
| Síldarvinnslan | SVN | Consumer Staples |
| Sjóvá-Almennar Tryggingar | SJOVA | Financials |

== History ==
=== The first OMXI15 index (1998–2009) ===
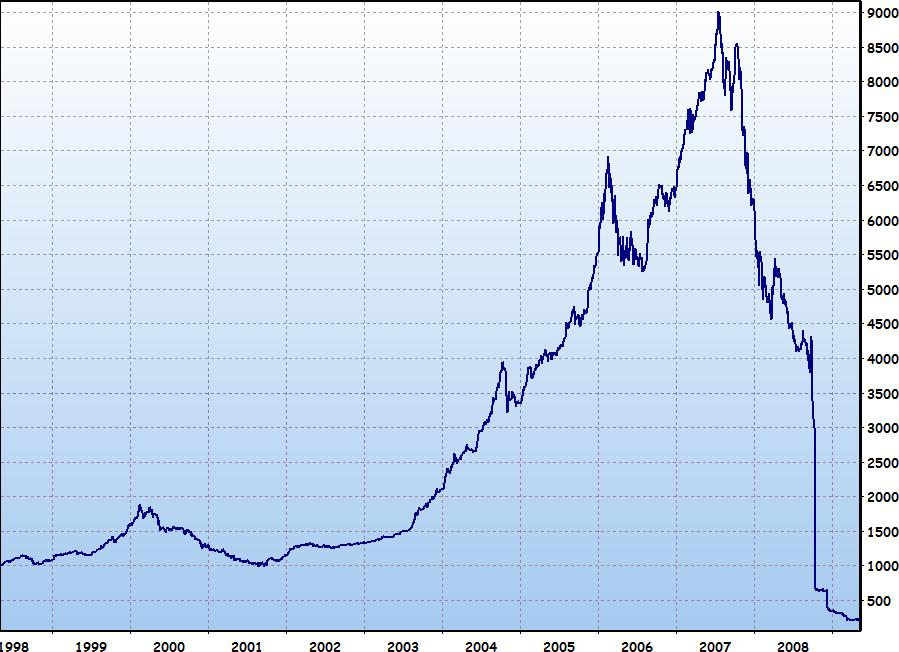
Index performance from 15 Jan 1998 – 6 May 2009

The Iceland Stock Exchange (ICEX) introduced the ICEX-15 index (ISIN: IS0000004380) in March 1998 with the base value 1,000 and the base date 31 December 1997. It consisted of the 15 largest and most traded stocks on the exchange and the composition of the index was reviewed twice a year. Following the OMX acquisition of ICEX in 2006, the index changed name to OMX Iceland 15 (OMXI15) on 2 April 2007.

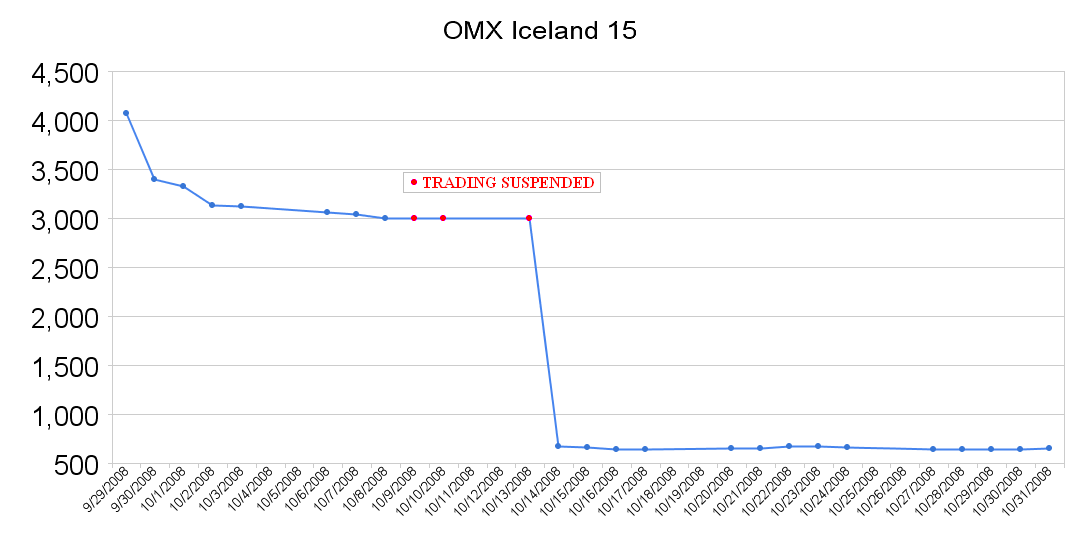
OMXI15 closing prices during the five trading weeks from 29 Sep – 31 Oct 2008

The OMX Iceland 15 index collapsed during the Icelandic financial crisis in 2008. Trading in the stock market was suspended for three successive trading days, on 9, 10 and 13 October. When trading resumed on 14 October 2008, the OMX Iceland 15 closed at 678.4, down 77% compared with the closing at 3,004.6 on 8 October 2008. This reflected the fact that the value of the three big banks (Glitnir, Kaupthing Bank and Landsbanki Íslands), which on 30 June 2008 formed 73.2% of the value of the OMX Iceland 15, had been set to zero.

At the final official review of the index effective in January 2009, twelve companies made up the index, four of which were Faroese. Two more banks, Straumur and SPRON, were delisted from the Nasdaq Iceland exchange and removed from the index before it was discontinued on 30 June 2009. The index closed at 263.7, about 97% below its peak at 9,016 on 18 July 2007.

=== The current OMXI15 index (2009–) ===
The OMXI15 index used today (ISIN: IS0000018885) was announced by Nasdaq Nordic on 2 January 2009 as a replacement for the original OMXI15 index introduced in 1998. The first iteration of the new index included only six stocks and was consequently named OMX Iceland 6 (OMXI6).

On 1 July 2014, the index was expanded from six to eight stocks and the name was changed to OMX Iceland 8 (OMXI8). Five years later, on 1 July 2019, two more stocks were added to the index and the name was updated to OMX Iceland 10 (OMXI10). On 2 January 2024, the index was expanded from ten to a maximum of fifteen stocks and renamed to OMX Iceland 15 (OMXI15), the same name as the old discontinued index.
