= Már Guðmundsson =

Icelandic economist and policy maker (born 1954)

Már Guðmundsson (born 21 June 1954) is an Icelandic economist and policy maker. He was the Governor of the Central Bank of Iceland from 2009 to 2019.

== Career ==
Prior to becoming Governor of the Central Bank of Iceland, Már served from 2004 to 2009 as Deputy Head of the Monetary and Economics Department and member of Senior Management of the Bank for International Settlements (BIS), during which time he also served on the Council of Management of SUERF - The European Money and Finance Forum. From 1994 to 2004 he was Chief Economist and Director of the Economics Department of the Central Bank of Iceland and from 1991, Manager of the department. Between 1988 and 1991 he was Economic adviser to the Minister of Finance of Iceland. Prior to that he was an economist in the Economics Department of the Central Bank, from 1980. Other responsibilities include being chairman of a committee formulating energy policy for the City of Reykjavik, 2002–04. A member of the Board of Directors of Icelandic Alloys Ltd. (a ferro-silicon company owned jointly by the Icelandic state, Elkem a/s in Norway, the Sumitomo Corporation in Japan and Icelandic investors), 2000–03. IMF/MAE adviser to the Central Bank of Trinidad and Tobago, 1998–99. A member of a government appointed committee revising the Central Bank legislation, 1991–92. Chairman of the Board Directors of "Söfnunarsjóður lífeyrisréttinda" (one of the biggest pension funds in Iceland), 1989–91.

== Education ==
Ph.D. studies in economics at University of Cambridge, England in 1987–89. M.Phil. degree in economics, University of Cambridge, 1981. B.A.(honours) degree in economics, University of Essex, England, 1979. Studied economics and mathematics during the winter 1976–77 at the University of Gothenburg in Sweden.

== Contribution ==
Már is considered a leading proponent of the Central Bank's monetary policy strategy of an inflation target and floating exchange rates adopted in March 2001. Since July 2009, he has been influential in charting a course for the Icelandic economy out of the present economic and financial crisis.

Preceded by Svein Harald Øygard	Governor of the Central Bank; 2009–2019	Succeeded by Ásgeir Jónsson
