= Svein Harald Øygard =

Norwegian economist

Svein Harald Øygard (born 29 June 1960) is a Norwegian economist and former acting President of the Central Bank of Iceland (Seðlabanki Íslands).

== Early life and education ==
Øygard studied economic sciences in Oslo and graduated from the University of Oslo in 1985 with a cand.oecon degree. His focus was on macroeconomics.

== Career ==
He was head of the Central Bank of Iceland in 2009, succeeded Davíð Oddsson and was in office from February to August 2009. In 2019 he published a book in Norwegian, Icelandic and English on the 2008 financial crisis, illustrated with the dramatic boom, bust and recovery of Iceland. The book, In the Combat Zone of Finance, is due to be published in Chinese (Citic Press).

Before becoming Governor he was a director in McKinsey. He started in McKinsey in 1995. During his time at McKinsey and Company, Øygard focused on projects and policy in the energy, industry, finance and public administration sectors. He had clients in Europe, America, Asia, Africa and the Middle East. From 2005–2007 he was director of McKinsey and Company in Norway. From 1983 to 1990 Øygard worked in the Norwegian Ministry of Finance and the Norwegian Parliament. During his tenure in the Ministry of Finance he was responsible for the Ministry's inflation analysis and the link between wages and price levels. For a short time, he also worked at the Norwegian central bank, Norges Bank. From 1990 to 1994, under the third cabinet Brundtland, he was a State Secretary in the Norwegian Ministry of Finance. His responsibilities included macroeconomics, the integration of financial and monetary policy, financial sector regulation and taxation. Øygard was part of the team that dealt with the Norwegian banking and currency crisis in 1992. Also in 1992, he led the review of Norwegian tax legislation and was a member of a task force set up by the Norwegian government to examine the potential economic impact of EU membership. Until 2000 Øygard was a member of the Economic Council of the Norwegian Labor Party. He was re-elected as Director in McKinsey & Company September 2009, a role he had until September 2016. In this period he led McKinsey´s work on oil & gas in Latin America, and served as Global research leader, Oil & Gas. In 2017 he co-founded DBO Energy.

He was the acting governor of Central Bank of Iceland in 2009.

In January 2020, Øygard has published the book In the combat zone of finance. The book has been published in 3 languages.

In June 2021, Øygard was introduced as chairman of the board of Norwegian Airlines.

Preceded by Davíð Oddsson	Chairman of the Board of Governors of the Central Bank of Iceland (acting); 2009	Succeeded by Már Guðmundsson
