= Askar Capital =

Bank in Iceland

Askar Capital was an investment bank in Iceland (2007–2010) offering advisory services related to investments in alternative financial products. The bank was established at the beginning of 2007 after a series of mergers, building on its history from 1993 as a financial advisor. The specialities of Askar Capital were corporate finance, real estate investments and debt management. As an authorized Investment Bank, Askar Capital was regulated by the Financial Supervisory Authority, headquartered in Reykjavík. The bank was heavily affected by the collapse of the major Icelandic banks in October 2008. The company carried on but eventually filed for bankruptcy on July 14, 2010.

== History ==
In 2007 Askar Capital, part of the Milestone Nordic Financial Group, was granted a license to operate as an investment bank. The firm provided a range of complementary financial services in three units, Capital Markets, Real Estate Investment Advisory and Avant Asset Financing, a wholly owned subsidiary of Askar Capital.

Askar Capital was the only Icelandic bank to experience losses from structured investment vehicles originating in the United States.

Askar Capital filed for bankruptcy on July 14, 2010. The verdict by the Supreme Court that foreign currency denominated loans were illegal had serious repercussions for the assets of the bank. In May 2010, the assets were appraised at 23 billion ISK. After the verdict, the estimate was lowered to 9-13 billion ISK. As the net worth was negative at least 10 billion ISK and restructuring was uncertain, the board did not consider it had a legitimate basis to continue. On January 27, 2010, claims on the bank amounted to 41.5 billion ISK.
