= Atlantic Petroleum (Faroe Islands) =

Atlantic Petroleum P/F

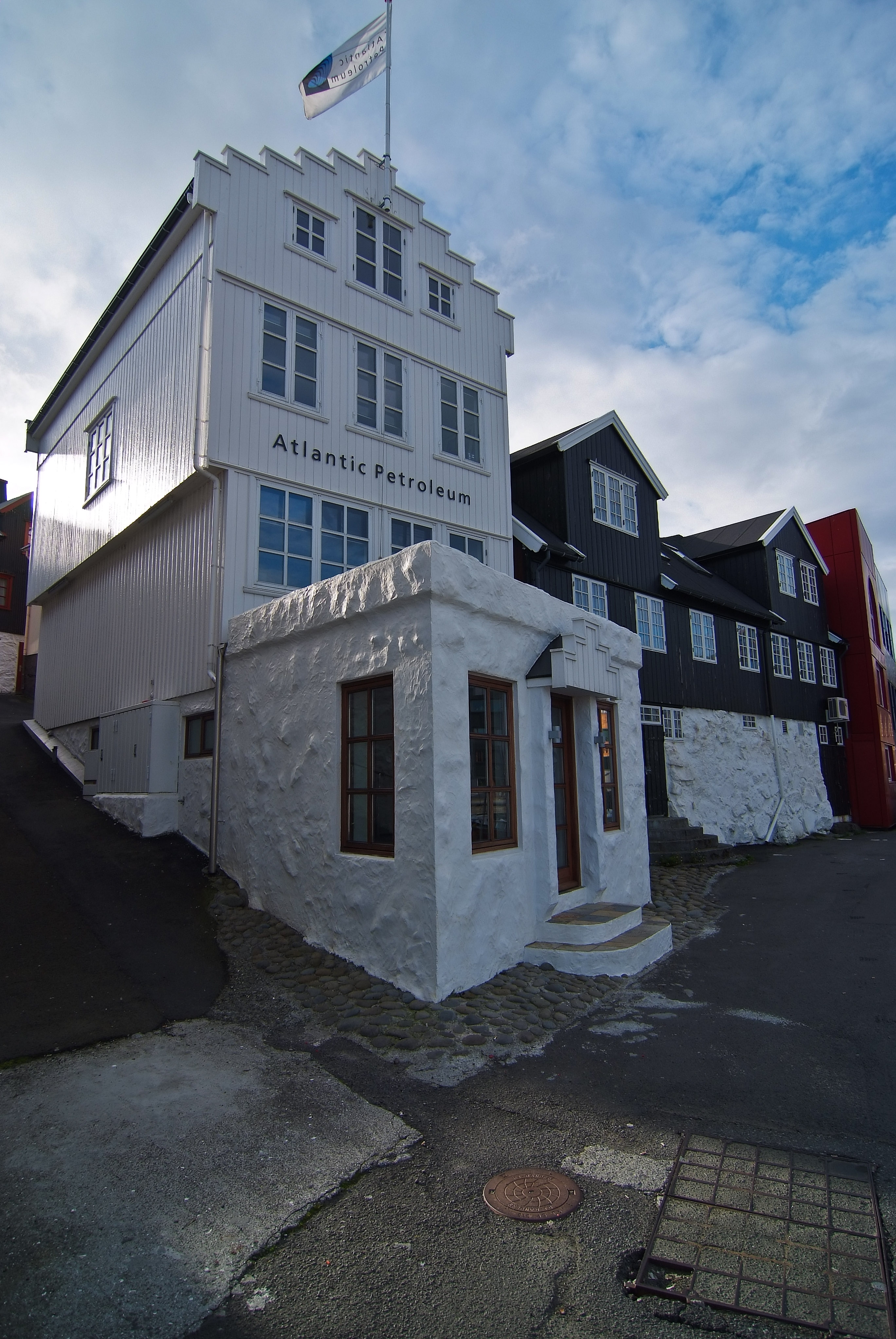
- Atlantic Petroleum head office
- Company type: Partafelag
- Traded as: Nasdaq Copenhagen: ATLA DKK
- ISIN: FO000A0DN9X4
- Industry: Petroleum
- Founded: 1998
- Headquarters: Tórshavn, Faroe Islands
- Key people: Ben Arabo (CEO), Birgir Durhuus (Chairman)
- Products: Oil and gas exploration and production
- Revenue: DKK 422.5 million (2010)
- Operating income: DKK 147.3 million (2010)
- Net income: DKK 109.1 million (2010)
- Total assets: DKK 671.8 million (end 2010)
- Total equity: DKK 377.9 million (end 2010)
- Number of employees: around 30 (end 2013)
- Subsidiaries: Atlantic Petroleum UK Limited; Atlantic Petroleum (Ireland) Limited; Atlantic Petroleum Norge AS (Norway)
- Website: www.petroleum.fo

Atlantic Petroleum P/F P/F is an oil and gas company situated in Tórshavn, Faroe Islands and has technical offices located in London (United Kingdom) and Bergen (Norway). It participates in exploration on the Faroese Continental Shelf, offshore Norway, Ireland, and United Kingdom. The company has production from three fields in the United Kingdom's sector of the North Sea and also participates in development projects.

== History ==
Atlantic Petroleum was established in 1998 by 18 private Faroese investors. It became the first listed Faroese company. In June 2005 Atlantic Petroleum was listed on the Iceland Stock Exchange (ICEX) and in October 2006 on Copenhagen Stock Exchange.

== Operations ==
In 2001, Atlantic Petroleum in the partnership with Amerada Hess, BG Group and DONG acquired two exploration licences in the United Kingdom Continental Shelf. Later four more assets were acquired in the United Kingdom Continental Shelf. These assets include among others interests in Ettrick, Chestnut, and Blackbird fields. In 2009, Atlantic Petroleum relinquished its stake in the Anglesey prospect of the United Kingdom sector of the North Sea.

In 2005, Atlantic Petroleum acquired two exploration licences in the waters of Faroe Islands. In Irish waters, Atlantic Petroleum has interests in Helvick, Hook Head and Ardmore fields.
