= Saga Investment Bank =

Bank of Iceland

Saga Investment Bank hf. was an independent investment bank in Iceland, specialising in providing a range of investment services including corporate finance, securities brokerage, asset management, bond issues and investment advice for companies, institutions and other professional investors. The firm operated according to the Financial Institutions Act No. 161/2002 under the supervision of the Icelandic Financial Supervisory Authority.

== Origins ==
Saga Investment Bank hf. was established in the autumn of 2006 under the name of Saga Capital Investment Bank. By the spring of 2007, the firm completed a closed share offer resulting in approximately 60 shareholders. Its standard banking operation began in the summer of 2007 after the Financial Supervisory Authority granted the firm an investment bank operating license. The bank abbreviated its name from Saga Capital Investment Bank to Saga Investment Bank in the autumn of 2010.

== Offices ==
Saga Investment Bank's offices were located in the north and southwest of Iceland. The firm's main headquarters was in Akureyri, but the Corporate Finance and Capital Markets sectors are located were Reykjavík.

== Business Segments ==
Saga Investment Bank was organised into two main business segments:

- Corporate Finance
- Capital Markets

Corporate Finance

- Initial public offerings, issues and share listings
- Consulting regarding restructuring and agreements with creditors
- Intermediation and consulting regarding mergers and acquisitions of companies

Capital Markets

Capital Markets provided stock broking services for companies, investment funds, mutual funds, pension funds and other investors. Saga Investment Bank was a member of stock exchanges in all the Nordic countries through NASDAQ OMX Nordic Exchange.

== Bankruptcy and Closure ==
Saga Investment Bank filed for bankruptcy in 2019 and ceased to exist following liquidation of all assets.
