= OMX Iceland All-Share PI =

Stock market index

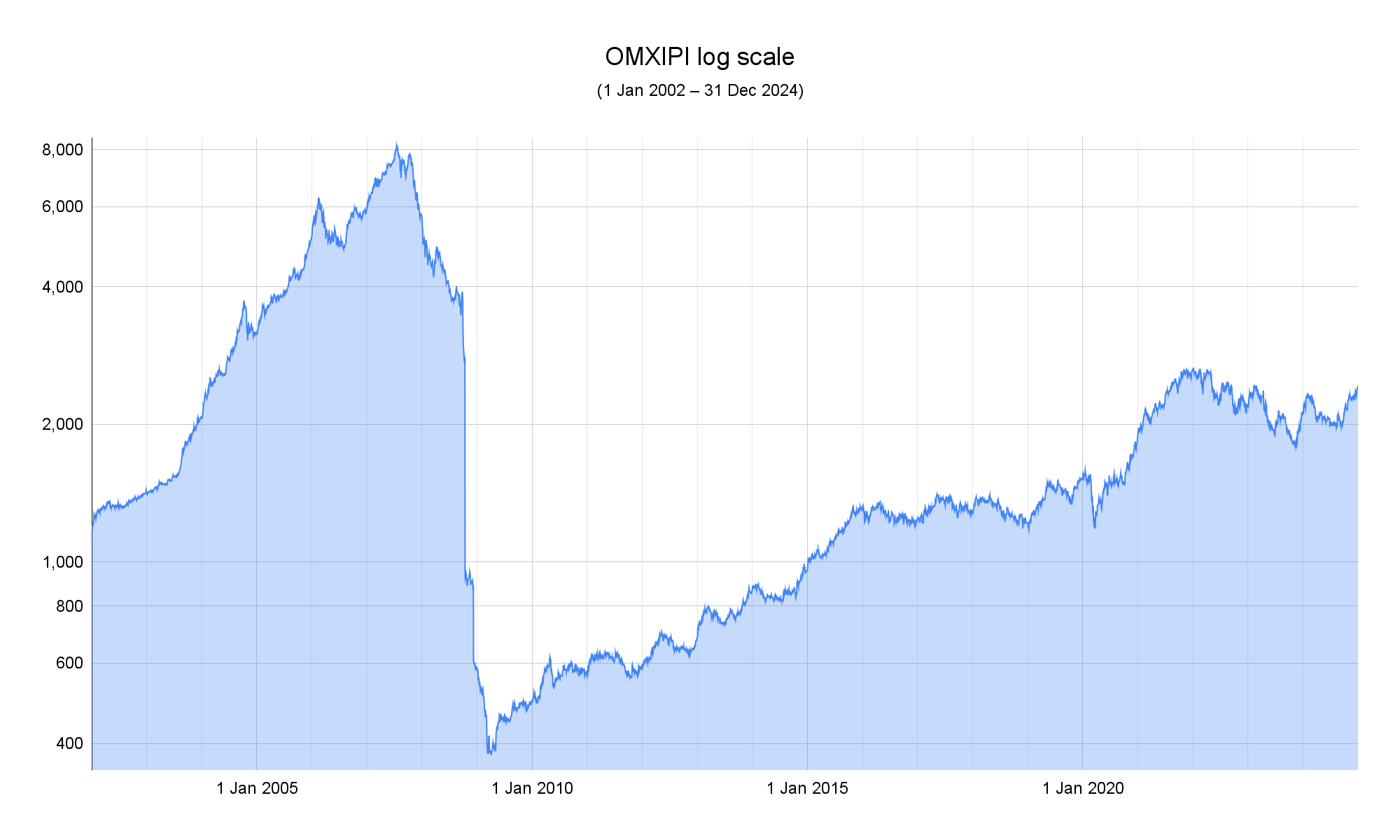
- OMXIPI index performance between 2002 and 2024 (log scale)
- Foundation: 1998
- Operator: Nasdaq, Inc.
- Exchanges: Nasdaq Iceland
- Constituents: 28 (as of March 2025)
- Weighting method: Capitalization-weighted
- Website: Official website
- ISIN: IS0000004463
- Reuters: .OMXIPI
- Bloomberg: ICEXI:IND

The OMX Iceland All-Share PI (OMXIPI, formerly ICEX Main) is a stock market index for all stocks traded on the Nasdaq Iceland main market. It is a price return and capitalization-weighted index.

The base date for the OMX Iceland All-Share PI is 31 December 1997, with a base value of 1,000. The index is reconstituted and rebalanced each trading day.

In 2004, a total return version of the OMX Iceland All-Share index was launched, the OMX Iceland All-Share GI (OMXIGI, formerly ICEXASTR). Unlike the OMXIPI, the OMXIGI includes reinvested dividends.

== History ==
The index was introduced in March 1998 by the Iceland Stock Exchange (ICEX) under the name ICEX Main. Following the OMX acquisition of the Iceland Stock Exchange in 2006, the index changed name to OMX Iceland All-Share PI (OMXIPI) on 2 April 2007.

In 2008, the index collapsed during the Icelandic financial crisis. Trading in the stock market was suspended for three successive trading days, on 9, 10 and 13 October. When trading resumed on 14 October 2008, the OMX Iceland All-Share PI closed at 919.25, down 67% from its previous closing level. The index continued to fall in the following months, reaching an all-time low closing at 378.98 on 1 April 2009. Compared with its peak closing at 8,174.28 on 18 July 2007, the index had plummeted more than 95% in less than two years.
