= Sparisjóður Reykjavíkur og nágrennis =

- Company type: Public (Nasdaq Iceland: SPRON))
- Industry: Banking
- Founded: March 5, 1932
- Defunct: 2009
- Fate: Government custodianship, assets moved to other state-owned banks
- Successor: Arion banki
- Headquarters: Reykjavík, Iceland
- Area served: Capital Region
- Key people: Guðmundur Hauksson (CEO)
- Number of employees: 190 (including sudsidiaries)
- Subsidiaries: SPRON Verðbréf, SPRON Factoring, Netbankinn, Frjálsi Fjárfestingarbankinn
- Website: www.spron.is

Sparisjóður Reykjavíkur og nágrennis (Icelandic pronunciation: [ˈspaːrɪˌsjouːðʏr̥ ˈreiːcaˌviːkʏr̥ ɔːɣ ˈnauˌɣrɛnːɪs], transl. Savings Bank of Reykjavik and Surrounding Areas), often shortened to SPRON was an Icelandic savings bank. It had six branches, all in the Reykjavík capital area. The bank was established March 5, 1932, and was nationalized in 2009 following a major banking and financial crisis in Iceland. Most assets were subsequently moved to Nýja Kaupþing.
