= Pensions in Iceland =

The Icelandic pension system is administered by Iceland’s State Social Security Institute under the Social Security Act, No.100/2007. Iceland has different legal retirement ages for public and private sector workers. Retirement benefits become available when workers reach the retirement ages of 65 for public sector workers and 67 for private sector workers. Iceland’s first retirement benefits program began in 1909 as a means-tested fund for the elderly poor. Iceland’s pension system provides higher gross salary replacement rates than most European programs despite its relatively low costs.

== "Three Pillars Approach" ==
Iceland’s pension system is divided into three components which are commonly referred to as the “three pillars approach”. The first pillar is publicly provided and income tested benefits which are weighted to inflation. The second pillar is occupational pension funds which are often government mandated. Occupational pensions require contribution for at least 40 years for private sector employees and 32 years for public sector employees. The final pillar is voluntary government approved private pensions which approximately 60% of Icelanders participate in.
