= Nasdaq Iceland =

Stock exchange in Reykjavík, Iceland

- Type: Stock exchange
- Location: Reykjavík, Iceland
- Coordinates: 64.139601°N 21.894336°W
- Founded: 1985; 41 years ago
- Owner: Nasdaq, Inc.
- Key people: Magnús Harðarson (President)
- Currency: Icelandic króna (ISK)
- No. of listings: 32 (as of March 2026)
- Indices: OMXI15; OMXIPI
- Website: Official website

Stock exchanges (listing venues) owned by Nasdaq, Inc.

The Nasdaq Iceland, formerly known as the Iceland Stock Exchange (ICEX; Icelandic: Kauphöll Íslands, [ˈkʰœypˌhœtl ˈistlan(t)s]), is a stock exchange for listing and trading in financial instruments such as fixed income instruments and equities. Companies in sectors such as retail, fishing, transportation, banking and real estate are listed on the exchange.

== History ==
=== 1985–2006: Early history ===
The Iceland Stock Exchange (ICEX) was established in 1985 as a joint venture of several banks and brokerage firms on the initiative of the Central Bank of Iceland. Trading began in 1986 in Icelandic government bonds with the central bank as the market maker. The first electronic trading system was launched in 1989 and trading in the first equities started in 1991. Trading increased rapidly thereafter and in 1999 there were 75 listed companies on the stock exchange (51 on the main list and 24 on the growth list).

In 1998, a new law passed by the Icelandic parliament required ICEX to be changed into a limited company with shareholders on 1 January 1999. It was later placed in a holding company, Eignarhaldsfélagið Verðbréfaþing hf. Among the shareholders were financial institutions, listed companies, pension funds and the Central Bank of Iceland.

In 2000, the Iceland Stock Exchange joined NOREX (Nordic exchanges' cooperation framework) and the common trading system SAXESS was implemented. This reduced the isolation of the Icelandic market and increased liquidity.

Through a collaboration with the Faroese Securities Market (VMF), Faroese bonds were listed on ICEX in 2003 and in June 2005, Atlantic Petroleum became the first Faroese company listed on the exchange. Nowadays, most Faroese companies are listed on Nasdaq Copenhagen and there are no longer any Faroese companies left on the Icelandic stock exchange.

In 2006, OMX acquired ICEX and the name was changed to OMX Iceland.

=== 2007–present: Nasdaq Iceland ===
Following Nasdaq's acquisition of OMX in 2007, the name was changed again, first to Nasdaq OMX Iceland and later to just Nasdaq Iceland. In 2010, the trading system was also changed to Nasdaq's trading system, INET.

In the mid-2000s, the banking sector made up an increasingly large part of the Icelandic stock market. In June 2008, six banks (Kaupthing Bank, Landsbanki, Glitnir, Straumur Investment Bank, Exista and Spron) accounted for 87% of the weight of the OMXI15 index. As a consequence, the stock market collapsed during the Icelandic financial crisis in 2008. Kaupthing, Landsbanki and Glitnir were taken under state control by the Financial Supervisory Authority (FME) and trading in the stock market was suspended for three successive trading days on 9, 10 and 13 October. When trading resumed on 14 October 2008, the OMXI15 index closed down 77% compared with the closing level on 8 October 2008, while the broader OMXIPI index was down 67%.

By the end of 2007, the total market value of the listed shares on Nasdaq Iceland was 2,570 billion ISK. By the end of 2009, that number had dropped to just 208 billion ISK and only 10 companies remained listed on the Nasdaq Iceland main list. The liquidity had also dried up and the turnover went from 3,122 billion ISK in 2007 to just over 50 billion ISK in 2009. In the 2010s, the turnover and the number of listed companies on Nasdaq Iceland increased again. In 2021, the turnover exceeded 1,000 billion ISK for the first time since the financial crisis and the number of companies on the main list had doubled to 20. At the end of February 2026, 27 companies are listed on Nasdaq Iceland's Main market and 5 on Nasdaq Iceland First North Growth Market, with the total market cap of 24 billion EUR.

In 2022, Iceland was upgraded by FTSE Russell to Secondary Emerging classification and included in its Emerging Market indices.

== Listed bonds ==
Fixed-income securities are also traded on markets operated by Nasdaq Iceland and include government and municipal bonds, covered and other bonds issued by financial institutions, and corporate debt securities. Nasdaq Iceland operates a sustainable bond market, listing green and other sustainable bonds as part of Nasdaq's Nordic Sustainable Debt framework. At the end of February 2026, 245 bonds were listed on the market, representing a total market value of EUR 26 billion.

== Listed companies ==
As of 9 February 2026, the following 27 stocks are listed on the Nasdaq Iceland main market.

Company	Symbol	GICS sector
Alvotech	ALVO	Health Care
Amaroq Minerals	AMRQ	Materials
Arion Bank	ARION	Financials
Brim	BRIM	Consumer Staples
Eik Fasteignafélag	EIK	Real Estate
Eimskipafélag Íslands	EIM	Industrials
Festi	FESTI	Consumer Discretionary
Hagar	HAGA	Consumer Staples
Hampiðjan	HAMP	Consumer Discretionary
Heimar	HEIMAR	Real Estate
Iceland Seafood International	ICESEA	Consumer Staples
Icelandair Group	ICEAIR	Industrials
Ísfélag	ISF	Consumer Staples
Íslandsbanki	ISB	Financials
JBT Marel	JBTM	Industrials
Kaldalón	KALD	Real Estate
Kvika Banki	KVIKA	Financials
Nova Klúbburinn	NOVA	Communication Services
Oculis	OCS	Health Care
Ölgerðin Egill Skallagrímsson	OLGERD	Consumer Staples
Reitir Fasteignafélag	REITIR	Real Estate
Síldarvinnslan	SVN	Consumer Staples
Síminn	SIMINN	Communication Services
Sjóvá-Almennar Tryggingar	SJOVA	Financials
Skagi	SKAGI	Financials
Skel Fjárfestingafélag	SKEL	Energy
Sýn	SYN	Communication Services

== See also ==
- OMX Iceland 15
- OMX Iceland All-Share PI
- List of European stock exchanges
- List of Icelandic companies
- Nasdaq Nordic
