= Brim hf. =

Icelandic seafood company

- Type: Public company (hlutafélag)
- Traded as: Nasdaq Iceland: BRIM
- Industry: Fishing industry
- Headquarters: Reykjavík, Iceland
- Products: Various seafood products
- Operating income: ▲US$ 225.5 million (2011)
- Number of employees: 920
- Website: brim.is

Brim hf. (known as HB Grandi until 2019) is a fishing and fish processing company in Iceland. Brim's headquarters are in Reykjavík where its office and groundfish production are located. The company also runs fish processing plants in two other towns in Iceland, Akranes and Vopnafjörður.

The company currently operates three freezing vessels, four wetfish trawlers and three pelagic vessels and runs fish processing plants in Reykjavík, Akranes and Vopnafjörður. Brim markets its products worldwide, products made from both groundfish and pelagic fish caught and processed by the company. In 2013 the company was awarded the Icelandic Presidential export award.

Brim is a publicly traded company on the Main Market of NASDAQ OMX Iceland, having over 2,700 shareholders.

In November 2022, Brim hf. invested in the Danish company Polar Seafood Denmark A/S.

== Groundfish operations ==
Former logo

=== Groundfish production Norðurgarður ===
Brim owns and operates a facility in Norðurgarður, Reykjavík which processes saithe and redfish. The facility produces both fresh products that are shipped via flight or by sea and land-frozen products. The facility employs 170 people and processed around 19,000 tons of raw material in 2013. The main office of the company is also located in the same building as the processing plant. The main office is divided into four offices with fifty employees; financial department, marketing department, groundfish department and pelagic department.

=== Groundfish production Akranes ===
At Akranes Brim operates another groundfish processing plant. The plant specializes in the processing of cod, producing loins and tails and fillets. As in Nordurgardur the Akranes facility produces both fresh products that are shipped daily via flight or sea and frozen products. The plant employs 85 persons and used 4,800 tons of raw material in 2013. However, because of the company’s increased land production, the Akaranes plant will process a great deal more of material in 2014.

=== Wetfish trawlers ===
Brim operates four wetfish trawlers, and together they provide the company's two groundfish plants with fish. The trawlers catch cod, saithe and redfish. In 2013 the company operated three wetfish trawlers with a total of 19,000 tons of catch. At the end of 2013 Brim's Freezer trawler Helga María was converted into a wetfish trawler, having previously been a freezer trawler.

=== Frozen at sea ===
Brim’s freezer trawlers are large vessels equipped to catch and produce Greenland halibut, redfish, cod, haddock, saithe, silver smelt and mackerel as well as various other species. The catch is processed as soon as it comes on board and each species goes through a specific process to ensure quality; size-graded, whole frozen, filleted, IQF or headed and gutted. The result is a great quality product from the pristine and unpolluted sea around Iceland. In 2013, Brim’s five freezer trawlers caught a total of 33,500 tons.

== Pelagic operations ==
=== Pelagic production ===
Brim operates a powerful freezing plant at Vopnafjördur which is specialized in the processing of pelagic fish; capelin and capelin roe, herring and mackerel. The fish is prepared in a number of way; whole-frozen, headed and gutted, fillets and flaps. Maximum output in the production of frozen whole fish is about 400 tons per day and employs an average of 65 persons, but the staff varies depending on the season. Brim's pelagic plant in Akranes is specialized in the processing of capelin roe. The main period of production for capelin is from January to March, mackerel is processed between July and September and processing of herring is from September to the end of the year.

=== Pelagic fleet ===
The company runs three pelagic vessels, Víkingur AK 100, Lundey NS 14, and Venus NS 150. The fleet mainly supplies the pelagic plant in Vopnafjörður and in 2013 the total catch was 135,000 tons of capelin, mackerel, herring and blue whiting.

== Fishmeal operations ==
=== Fishmeal production Vopnafjörður ===
Brim operates two fish meal plants, one located in Vopnafjörður and the other one in Akranes. The Vopnafjörður plant uses only electricity from renewable energy resources. The plant also has a chemical laboratory which runs chemical analysis of raw materials and products. All raw material is measured for freshness when the pelagic vessels unload their catch. The raw material then goes through a number of studies before it is grouped into quality categories. The species that are processed are capelin, herring, blue whiting and mackerel. The products are mainly used in feed, however the production is also certified for human consumption.

=== Fishmeal production Akranes ===
The company also operates a fishmeal plant in Akranes which processes capelin, capelin off cut and white fish off cut. The total annual work unit of 10 processed around 25,000 tons of raw material in 2013. The plant has two large production lines for pelagic fish that has a capacity of 800 tons per day. There is also a special production line for white fish cutoff from the company's groundfish plant in Reykjavik that only runs on electricity from renewable energy resources and has a capacity of 60 tons per day.

== Further productions ==
=== Fish drying ===
Laugafiskur was acquired and merged with HB Grandi in 2013. The company was founded in 1988. It is located in Akranes, where a staff of 27 produce dried fish products. Laugafiskur has an annual production of 7,500 tonnes of raw material. Its products are mostly cod, but haddock and saithe are also a substantial part. The main products are fish heads, bones and cutlets. Laugafiskur exports mainly to Nigeria, where dried fish is popular.

== International and national certifications ==
=== Iceland Responsible Fisheries logo of origin and certification ===
Brim is a member of Iceland Responsible Fisheries, which indicates Icelandic origin of fish catches in Icelandic waters and responsible fisheries management. It refers to Icelandic origin and to the Statement on Responsible Fisheries in Iceland. The logo provides opportunities for stakeholders in the value chain of Icelandic seafood to highlight Icelandic origin. Icelandic fishing vessel owners, processing plants as well as other stakeholders in the value chain of Icelandic seafood products can apply for a permit to use the logo. The logo can be used on packaging of products produced from catch of Icelandic seafood or in advertisements.

Iceland Responsible Fisheries also has certifications for certain fish species which confirms responsible fisheries management and good treatment of marine resources. The certificate is approved by the certification body Global Trust Certification Ltd. The fish species that have so far received the Iceland Responsible Fisheries certification are; redfish, cod and saithe and haddock.

=== Festa - Icelandic Center for Corporate Social Responsibility ===
In January 2014, HB Grandi joined Festa, the Icelandic Center for Corporate Social Responsibility (CSR). The aim of Festa is to be a knowledge center for CSR in Iceland, promote discussion on CSR, support companies implementing CSR strategies and cooperation with international CSR centers.

=== FEMAS ===
Both of Brim's fishmeal plants have the FEMAS certification. FEMAS was established to assure the safety of feed materials entering the livestock food chain. It covers products such as food processing industry by-products, waste products and minerals and can be extended to imported agricultural commodities (unless produced to an equivalent scheme). The scheme is audited and certified by an independent certification body, in accordance with the internationally recognised standard EN45011 (also known as ISO Guide 65). This means that the certification body is itself independently assessed every year to ensure that the standard is implemented and administered consistently and fairly.

=== MSC ===
In June 2014 HB Grandi received chain-of-custody certification from the Marine Stewardship Council (MSC). The certification means that consumers and seafood buyers can have confidence that the fish they are buying comes from a fishery that meets the MSC environmental standard for sustainable fishing. HB Grandi has complete certification for three species; cod, haddock and saithe as well as redfish being under MSC assessment.

== Controversy ==
In March 2015 High Liner Foods and Trader Joe's announced they would no longer carry HB Grandi products due to the company's indirect involvement in the harvesting of whale meat.

== See also ==
- Samherji
