= NOREX =

In 1997, the Copenhagen Stock Exchange and the Stockholm Stock Exchange initiated formalized cooperation through NOREX, with the purpose of establishing a joint Nordic securities market. At the beginning of 1998, the two exchanges established a joint company, Nordic Exchanges A/S, whose primary task was to market NOREX worldwide.

The program was absorbed by OMX when it merged with the Stockholm Stock Exchange in 1998 and purchased the Copenhagen Stock Exchange in 2005. This created a single Nordic exchange to which were added a number of other exchanges over the years, and would eventually be part of NASDAQ OMX Group by 2008.
