= Central Bank of Iceland =

Monetary Authority of Iceland

Coordinates: 64°08′56″N 21°55′55″W

Central Bank of Iceland Seðlabanki Íslands

- Headquarters of the bank
- Central bank of: Iceland
- Headquarters: Kalkofnsvegur 1, Reykjavík
- Established: 7 April 1961
- Ownership: 100% state ownership
- Governor: Ásgeir Jónsson
- Currency: Icelandic króna ISK (ISO 4217)
- Reserves: 6.839 billion USD
- Preceded by: Landsbanki Íslands
- Website: cb.is (in English) sedlabanki.is (in Icelandic)

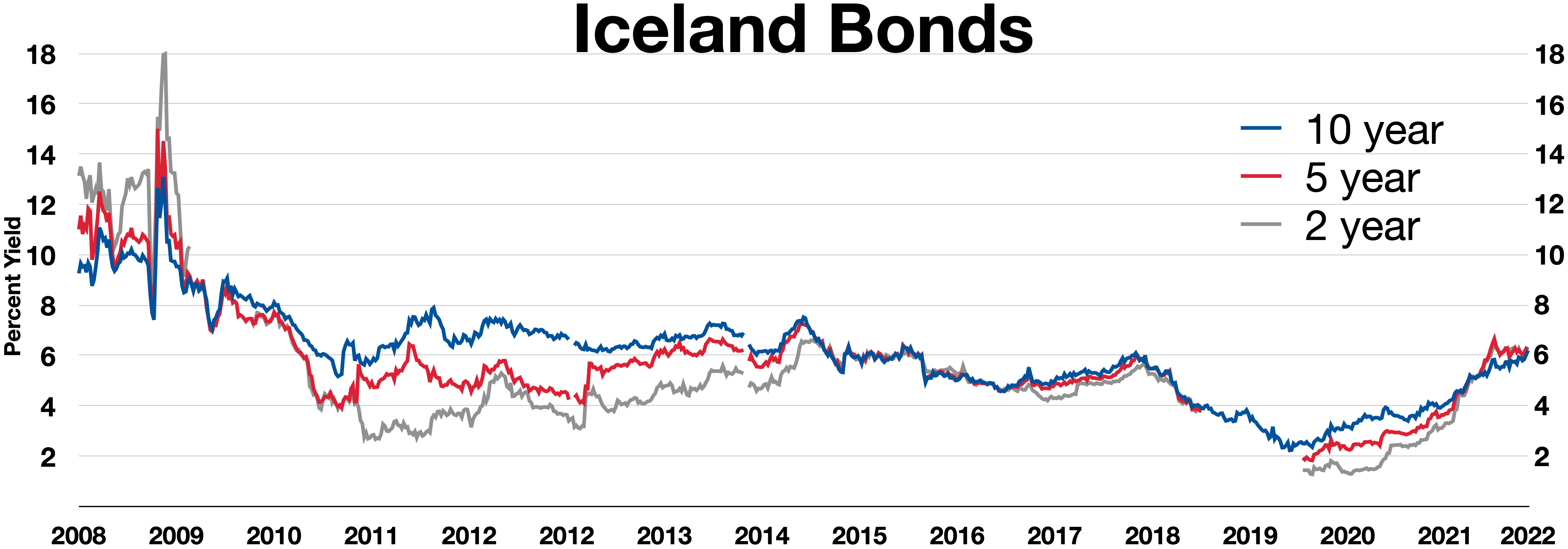
Iceland bonds had an Inverted yield curve in 2008 10 year bonds 5 year bonds 2 year bonds

The Central Bank of Iceland (Icelandic: Seðlabanki Íslands, pronounced [ˈsɛðlaˌpauŋcɪ ˈistlan(t)s]) is the central bank or reserve bank of Iceland. It is owned by the Icelandic government, and is administered by a governor and a seven-member supervisory board, elected by the country's parliament following each general election. It has the sole right to issue notes and coins of Icelandic krónur and to manage the state's foreign currency reserves.

== History ==
The Central Bank of Iceland was created in 1961 by an act of the Alþingi out of the central banking department of Landsbanki Íslands, which had been the island's sole bank of issue since 1927 and had conducted only limited monetary policy.

The Central Bank Act of 1986 eliminated the ability of the Central Bank to regulate the interest rates of commercial banks and savings banks.

Though nominally independent, the Central Bank of Iceland was historically expected to follow the lead of the central government. In 2001, however, a floating exchange rate policy was introduced and since then the Central Bank has been empowered to adopt an inflation target and manage monetary policy so as to achieve price stability independent of the policies of the central government.

In 2015, after the 2008–2011 Icelandic financial crisis, the government of Iceland considered "a revolutionary monetary proposal" to abolish private money creation and to end to fractional-reserve banking. Similar to the Swiss Sovereign Money Initiative, this plan would remove the power of money creation from the commercial banks and give it to the Central Bank of Iceland. The option was not implemented.

On 1 January 2020, the Central Bank of Iceland absorbed the Financial Supervisory Authority, previously an independent institution established in 1999.

On june 2025 it joined the Eurosystem’s TARGET Instant Payment Settlement (TIPS) system, after an agreement with the European Central Bank.

== Leadership ==
In its early days, the bank was governed by a system of 3 directors, similar to how the National Bank of Denmark is managed.

Name	Mandat	Name	Mandat	Name	Mandat
Jóhannes Nordal	1961–1993	Vilhjálmur Þór	1961–1964	Jón G. Maríasson	1961–1967
Jón Sigurðsson	1993–1994	Sigtryggur Klemensson	1966–1971	Davíð Ólafsson	1967–1986
Steingrímur Hermannsson	1994–1998	Svanbjörn Frímannsson	1971–1973	Geir Hallgrímsson	1986–1990
Finnur Ingólfsson	2000–2002	Guðmundur Hjartarson	1974–1984	Birgir Ísleifur	1991–2005
Ingimundur Friðriksson	2002–2003	Tómas Árnason	1985–1993	Davíð Oddsson	2005–2009
Jón Sigurðsson	2003–2006	Eiríkur Guðnason	1994–2009		
Ingimundur Friðriksson	2006–2009				

Following the 2008 crisis, the directors' system was abolished and Norwegian Svein Harald Øygard was appointed interim governor of the bank from February to August 2009.

=== List of governors ===
N.º	Name	Mandat
1	Már Guðmundsson	20 August 2009–31 July 2019
2	Ásgeir Jónsson	Since 1 July 2019

== See also ==
- 2008–2011 Icelandic financial crisis
- Economy of Iceland
- Financial Supervisory Authority (Iceland)
- Icelandic króna
- List of central banks
- List of financial supervisory authorities by country
