= Agricultural Bank of Iceland =

Icelandic bank

- Industry: Banking
- Founded: 1 July 1930
- Defunct: 2003
- Fate: Merged with Kaupthing Bank
- Successor: Kaupþing-Búnaðarbanki
- Headquarters: Reykjavík, Iceland
- Owner: 45.8% Icelandic Government
- Website: http://www.bi.is

The Agricultural Bank of Iceland (Icelandic: Búnaðarbanki Íslands, pronounced [ˈpuːnaðarˌpauŋcɪ ˈistlan(t)s]; or simply Búnaðarbankinn [ˈpuːnaðarˌpauŋcɪn], lit. 'The Agricultural Bank') was an Icelandic bank. It was promulgated by the Icelandic Parliament in 1929 and started operation a year later. In 2002 it was privatized and merged with Kaupthing Bank the following year.
