= Arion Bank =

Icelandic bank

Arion Banki hf.
- Type: Hlutafélag
- Traded as: Nasdaq Iceland: ARION
- Industry: Banking
- Predecessors: Kaupthing Bank; Agricultural Bank of Iceland
- Founded: July 1, 1930 (96 years ago) in Reykjavík, Iceland (as Búnaðarbanki Íslands); April 2003 (as KB Banki); October 18, 2008 (as Arion Banki)
- Headquarters: Reykjavík, Iceland
- Number of locations: 13 branches (2023); 40 ATMs (2023)
- Area served: Iceland
- Key people: Benedikt Gíslason (CEO); Paul Horner (Chairman)
- Products: Consumer banking, corporate banking, mortgage loans, private banking, private equity, wealth management, credit cards
- Revenue: ▲ISK 50.764 billion (2020)
- Operating income: ▲ISK 26.323 billion (2020)
- Net income: ▲ISK 12.469 billion (2020)
- Total assets: ▲ISK 1.172 trillion (2020)
- Total equity: ▼ISK 197.845 billion (2020)
- Number of employees: 776 (End of 2020)
- Subsidiaries: Vörður Insurance; Stefnir Asset Management
- Website: www.arionbanki.is

Arion Banki hf., formerly Nýja Kaupþing hf. (lit. 'New Kaupthing'), is an Icelandic bank with roots tracing back to 1930. The bank operates in the Greater Reykjavík area as well as in the largest urban areas around the country. In 2016 the bank had the third largest market share of the current accounts in Iceland (30%), behind Landsbankinn (36.1%) and Íslandsbanki (31%). The Bank has 13 branches all over the country and over 100,000 customers. In recent years, the bank has faced criticism for shutting down several of its branches in smaller towns throughout Iceland.

== History ==
Nýja Kaupþing was established as a state-owned bank on the ruins of the Icelandic-based operations of the former Kaupthing Bank and placed in control of the old bank's domestic assets and liabilities. On 20 November 2009, New Kaupthing changed its name to Arion Banki.

On behalf of its creditors Kaupthing, through its subsidiary Kaupskil, took ownership of Arion Bank on 8 January 2010. Kaupskil holds 87% of common equity and the Icelandic State Financial Investments (ISFI) 13%. Kaupskil appoints five out of six board members of Arion Bank, the government appoints the sixth. Kaupskil has a call option to buy the government's stake at a later point.

Following a change in ownership in 2010 a new board of directors as well as a new CEO, Höskuldur H. Ólafsson, and management team were appointed. A new strategic plan was also introduced.

In February 2017, the government announced its intention to sell its minority stake through an IPO.

== See also ==
- 2008–2011 Icelandic financial crisis
- List of banks in Iceland
