= 2008–2011 Icelandic financial crisis =

Default of three major Icelandic banks

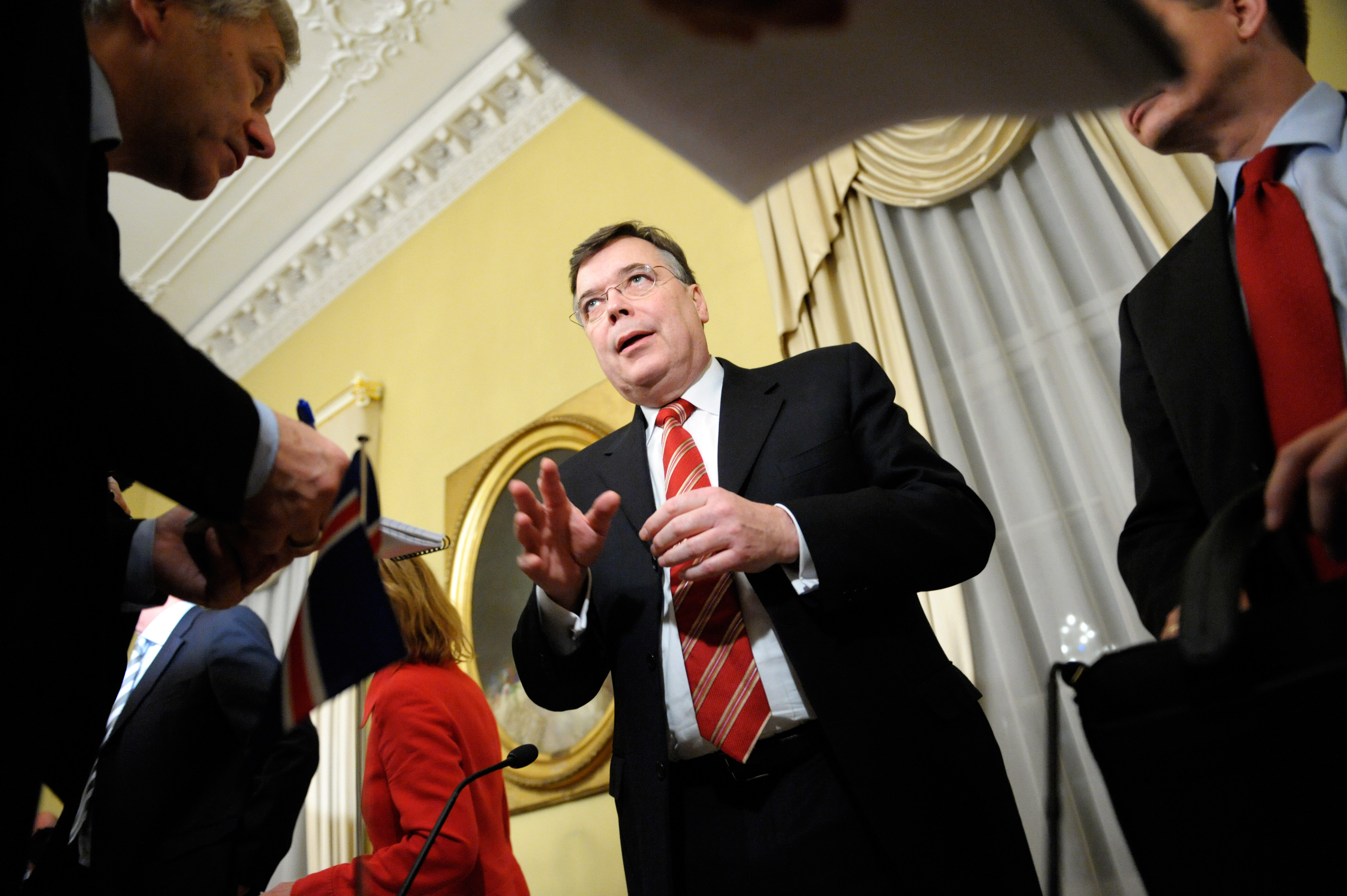
Prime Minister of Iceland Geir H. Haarde speaks with reporters on 27 October 2008.

A major financial crisis took place in Iceland between 2008 and 2010. It involved the default of all three of the country's major privately owned commercial banks in late 2008, following problems in refinancing their short-term debt and a run on deposits in the Netherlands and the United Kingdom. Relative to the size of its economy, Iceland's systemic banking collapse was the largest of any country in economic history. The crisis led to a severe recession and the 2009 Icelandic financial crisis protests.

In the years preceding the crisis, three Icelandic banks, Kaupthing, Landsbanki and Glitnir, multiplied in size. This expansion was driven by ready access to credit in international financial markets, in particular money markets. As the 2008 financial crisis unfolded, investors perceived the Icelandic banks to be increasingly risky. Trust in the banks gradually faded, leading to a sharp depreciation of the Icelandic króna in 2008 and increased difficulties for the banks in rolling over their short-term debt. At the end of the second quarter of 2008, Iceland's external debt was 9.553 trillion Icelandic krónur (€50 billion), more than 7 times the GDP of Iceland in 2007. The assets of the three banks totaled 14.437 trillion krónur at the end of the second quarter 2008, equal to more than 11 times the national GDP. Due to the huge size of the Icelandic financial system in comparison with the Icelandic economy, the Central Bank of Iceland was unable to act as a lender of last resort during the crisis, further aggravating the mistrust in the banking system.

On 29 September 2008, it was announced that Glitnir would be nationalised. However, subsequent efforts to restore faith in the banking system failed. On 6 October, the Icelandic legislature instituted an emergency law which enabled the Financial Supervisory Authority (FME) to take control over financial institutions and made domestic deposits in the banks priority claims. In the following days, new banks were founded to take over the domestic operations of Kaupthing, Landsbanki and Glitnir. The old banks were put into receivership and liquidation, resulting in losses for their shareholders and foreign creditors. Outside Iceland, more than half a million depositors lost access to their accounts in foreign branches of Icelandic banks. This led to the 2008–2013 Icesave dispute, which ended with an EFTA Court ruling that Iceland was not obliged to repay Dutch and British depositors minimum deposit guarantees.

In an effort to stabilize the situation, the Icelandic government stated that all domestic deposits in Icelandic banks would be guaranteed, imposed strict capital controls to stabilize the value of the Icelandic króna, and secured a US$5.1bn sovereign debt package from the IMF and the Nordic countries in order to finance a budget deficit and the restoration of the banking system. The international bailout support programme led by IMF officially ended on 31 August 2011, while the capital controls which were imposed in November 2008 were lifted on 14 March 2017.

The financial crisis had a serious negative impact on the Icelandic economy. The national currency fell sharply in value, foreign currency transactions were virtually suspended for weeks, and the market capitalisation of the Icelandic stock exchange fell by more than 90%. Iceland underwent a severe economic depression. Its gross domestic product dropped by 10% in real terms between the third quarter of 2007 and the third quarter of 2010. A new era with positive GDP growth started in 2011, and has helped foster a gradually declining trend for the unemployment rate. The government budget deficit has declined from 9.7% of GDP in 2009 and 2010 to 0.2% of GDP in 2014; the central government gross debt-to-GDP ratio was expected to decline to less than 60% in 2018 from a maximum of 85% in 2011.

== Development ==
=== Currency ===
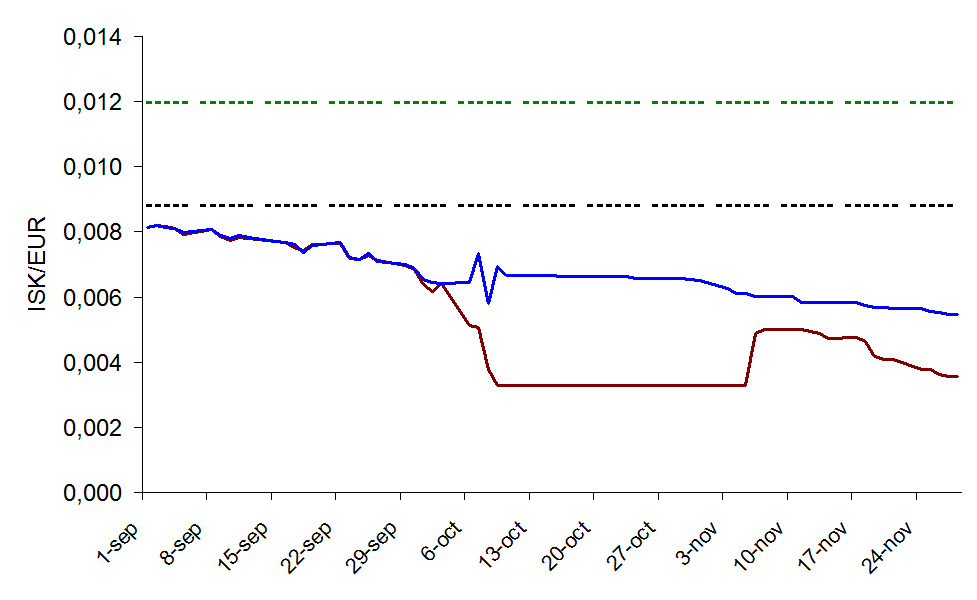
The decline of the Icelandic króna against the euro, shown from September to November 2008. The lower solid line (in brown) shows the offshore rate as quoted by the European Central Bank; the higher solid line (in blue) shows the onshore rate as quoted by the Central Bank of Iceland. The two solid lines diverge on 6 October, after Glitnir had defaulted on some wholesale depositors in the UK, although there had been unusually large differences (up to 5%) during the previous week. The lower dashed line (in black) shows the average rate from January to August 2008 (113.31 krónur to the euro, already down from 91.2 krónur to the euro on 31 December 2007), while the upper dashed line shows the long term average from 1999 to 2007 (83.423 krónur to the euro).

The Icelandic króna declined more than 35% against the euro from January to September 2008. Inflation of consumer prices was running at 14%, and Iceland's interest rates had been raised to 15.5% to deal with the high inflation.

On the night of Wednesday, 8 October 2008, the Central Bank of Iceland abandoned its attempt to peg the Icelandic króna at 131 krónur to the euro after trying to set this peg on 6 October. By 9 October, the Icelandic króna was trading at 340 to the euro when trading in the currency collapsed due to the FME's takeover of the last major Icelandic bank, and thus the loss of all króna trade 'clearing houses'. The next day, the central bank introduced restrictions on the purchase of foreign currency within Iceland. From 9 October to 5 November, the European Central Bank quoted a reference rate of 305 krónur to the euro.

Iceland's account in 2007 and 2008: Exports (imports) of goods per month in millions of euros
	2007	2008
Sept.	204.4 (316.3)	325.0 (323.5)
Oct.	274.6 (370.7)	310.8 (239.0)
Nov.	346.4 (373.3)	250.6 (236.7)
Goods excluding ships and aircraft. Data from Statistics Iceland and the Central Bank of Iceland: conversion from ISK at Central Bank of Iceland monthly average exchange rates. For comparison, monthly average exports (imports) of services were €139.3M (€185.4M) in Q2/2007; €125.6M (€151.9M) in Q2/2008.

The Central Bank of Iceland set up a temporary system of daily currency auctions on 15 October to facilitate international trade. The value of the króna is determined by supply and demand in these auctions. The first auction sold €25 million at a rate of 150 krónur to the euro. Commercial króna trading outside Iceland restarted on 28 October, at an exchange rate of 240 krónur to the euro, after Icelandic interest rates had been raised to 18%. The foreign exchange reserves of the Central Bank of Iceland fell by US$289 million during October 2008.

During November, the real exchange rate (discounting inflation) of the Icelandic króna, as quoted by the Central Bank of Iceland, was roughly one-third lower than the average rate from 1980 to 2008, and 20% lower than the historical lows during the same period. The external rate as quoted by the European Central Bank was lower still. On the last trading day of the month, 28 November, the Central Bank of Iceland was quoting 182.5 krónur to the euro, while the European Central Bank was quoting 280 krónur to the euro.

On 28 November, the Central Bank of Iceland and the Minister for Business Affairs agreed on a new set of currency regulations, replacing the central bank's restrictions imposed early on in the crisis. Movements of capital to and from Iceland were banned without a license from the central bank. It was estimated at this time that foreign investors held some €2.9 billion in króna-denominated securities, popularly known as "glacier bonds".

The foreign exchange rules also oblige Icelandic residents to deposit any new foreign currency they receive with an Icelandic bank. There is anecdotal evidence that some Icelandic exporters had been operating an informal offshore foreign exchange market, trading pounds and euros for krónur outside the control of any regulator and starving the onshore market of foreign currency. Hence the Central Bank had to sell €124 million of currency reserves in November 2008 to make up the difference, compared with an estimated trade surplus of €13.9 million.

The last currency auction was held on 3 December. The domestic interbank foreign exchange market reopened the following day with three market makers, all of them government-owned. On the first two days of domestic trading, the króna climbed to 153.3 to the euro, up 22% against the last currency auction rate.

In January 2009, the exchange rate of Icelandic króna against Euro seemed to be more stabilized compared with the situation in October 2008, with the lowest rate at 177.5 krónur per EUR on 1, 3 and 4 January 2009, and the highest at 146.8 on 30 January 2009. In the meantime, however, Iceland's 12-month inflation in January 2009 climbed to a record high of 18.6%.

=== Banks ===
In September 2008, internal documents from Kaupthing, the largest bank in Iceland, were leaked to WikiLeaks. On 29 September 2008, a plan was announced for the bank Glitnir to be nationalised by the Icelandic government with the purchase of a 75% stake for €600 million. The government stated that it did not intend to hold ownership of the bank for a long period, and that the bank was expected to carry on operating as normal. According to the government, the bank "would have ceased to exist" within a few weeks if there had not been intervention. It later turned out that Glitnir had US$750 million of debt due to mature on 15 October. However, the nationalization of Glitnir never went through, as it was placed in receivership by the FME before the initial plan of the Icelandic government to purchase a 75% stake had been approved by shareholders.

The announced nationalisation of Glitnir came just as the United Kingdom government was forced to nationalise Bradford & Bingley and to sell its retail operations and branch network to Grupo Santander. Over the weekend of 4–5 October, British newspapers carried many articles detailing the nationalisation of Glitnir and the high leverage of Iceland's other banks. Influential BBC business editor Robert Peston published an opinion piece on the banks, stating that debt insurance for Kaupthing required a premium of £625,000 to guarantee the return of £1 million: "the worst case of financial BO I've encountered in some time" was his graphic description. The Guardian said "Iceland is on the brink of collapse. Inflation and interest rates are raging upwards. The krona, Iceland's currency, is in freefall." These articles spooked investors discussing Icesave (the brand name of Landsbanki in the UK and the Netherlands) in online forums and many started moving their savings out of the Internet bank. Problems with access to the site hinted at a run on savings.

On 6 October, a number of private interbank credit facilities to Icelandic banks were shut down. Prime Minister Geir Haarde addressed the nation in a speech that became infamous for its portentous closing words: 'God bless Iceland'. He announced a package of new regulatory measures which were to be put to the Althing, Iceland's parliament, immediately, with the cooperation of the opposition parties. These included the power of the FME to take over the running of Icelandic banks without nationalising them, and preferential treatment for depositors in the event that a bank had to be liquidated. In a separate measure, retail deposits in Icelandic branches of Icelandic banks were guaranteed in full. The emergency measures had been deemed unnecessary by the Icelandic government less than 24 hours earlier.

That evening, the Guernsey subsidiary of Landsbanki went into voluntary administration with the approval of the Guernsey Financial Services Commission. The administrators would later say that "The main reason for the Bank's difficulties has been the placing of funds with its UK fellow subsidiary, Heritable Bank." Guernsey's Chief Minister stated "the directors of Landsbanki Guernsey took appropriate steps by putting the bank into administration."

The FME placed Landsbanki in receivership early on 7 October. A press release from the FME stated that all of Landsbanki's domestic branches, call centres, ATMs and internet operations will be open for business as usual, and that all "domestic deposits" were fully guaranteed. The UK government used the Banking (Special Provisions) Act 2008 first to transfer retail deposits from Heritable Bank to a Treasury holding company, then to sell them to Dutch bank ING Direct for £1 million. The same day, the FME also placed Glitnir into receivership.

That afternoon, there was a telephone conversation between Icelandic Finance Minister Árni Mathiesen and UK Chancellor of the Exchequer Alistair Darling. That evening, one of the governors of the Central Bank of Iceland, Davíð Oddsson, was interviewed on Icelandic public service broadcaster RÚV and stated that "we [the Icelandic State] do not intend to pay the debts of the banks that have been a little heedless". He compared the government's measures to the U.S. intervention at Washington Mutual, and suggested that foreign creditors would "unfortunately only get 5–10–15% of their claims".

Darling announced that he was taking steps to freeze the assets of Landsbanki in the UK. The Landsbanki Freezing Order 2008 was passed at 10 am on 8 October 2008 and came into force ten minutes later. Under the order the UK Treasury froze the assets of Landsbanki within the UK, and introduced provisions to prevent the sale or movement of Landsbanki assets within the UK, even if held by the Central Bank of Iceland or the Government of Iceland. The freezing order took advantage of provisions in sections 4 and 14 and Schedule 3 of the Anti-terrorism, Crime and Security Act 2001, and was made "because the Treasury believed that action to the detriment of the UK's economy (or part of it) had been or was likely to be taken by certain persons who are the government of or resident of a country or territory outside the UK".

The UK Prime Minister, Gordon Brown, announced that the UK government would launch legal action against Iceland over concerns with compensation for the estimated 300,000 UK savers. Geir Haarde said at a press conference on the following day that the Icelandic government was outraged that the UK government applied provisions of anti-terrorism legislation to it in a move they dubbed an "unfriendly act". The Chancellor of the Exchequer also said that the UK government would foot the entire bill to compensate UK retail depositors, estimated at £4 billion. It is reported that more than £4 billion in Icelandic assets in the UK have been frozen by the UK government. The UK Financial Services Authority (FSA) also declared Kaupthing Singer & Friedlander, the UK subsidiary of Kaupthing Bank, in default on its obligations, sold Kaupthing Edge, its Internet bank, to ING Direct, and put Kaupthing Singer & Friedlander into administration. Over £2.5 billion of deposits for 160,000 customers were sold to ING Direct. The scale of the run on Kaupthing Edge deposits had been such that many transactions were not completed until 17 October. Although Geir Haarde has described the UK government's actions over Kaupthing Singer & Friedlander as an "abuse of power" and "unprecedented", they were the third such actions taken under the Banking (Special Provisions) Act 2008 in less than ten days, after interventions in Bradford & Bingley and Heritable Bank.

On the same day, the Sveriges Riksbank, Sweden's central bank, made a credit facility of 5 billion Swedish krona (€520 million) available to Kaupthing Bank Sverige AB, the Swedish subsidiary of Kaupthing. The loan was to pay "depositors and other creditors".

On 9 October, Kaupthing was placed into receivership by the FME, following the resignation of the entire board of directors. The bank said that it was in technical default on its loan agreements after its UK subsidiary had been placed into administration. Kaupthing's Luxembourg subsidiary asked for, and obtained, a suspension of payments (similar to chapter 11 protection) in the Luxembourg District Court. Kaupthing's Geneva office, which was a branch of its Luxembourg subsidiary, was prevented from making any payments of more than 5000 Swiss francs by the Swiss Federal Banking Commission. The directors of Kaupthing's subsidiary on the Isle of Man decided to wind up the company after consultation with the Manx authorities. The Finnish Financial Supervision Authority, Rahoitustarkastus, announced having taken control of Kaupthing's Helsinki branch already on 6th, to prevent money from being sent back to Iceland.

On the same day, the UK Treasury issued a licence under the Landsbanki Freezing Order 2008 to allow the London branch of Landsbanki to continue some business. A second licence was issued on 13 October, when the Bank of England provided a £100 million secured loan to Landsbanki "to help maximise the returns to UK creditors".

On 12 October the Norwegian government took control of Kaupthing's Norwegian operations, including "all of the bank's assets and liabilities in Norway".

On 21 October, the Central Bank of Iceland asked the remaining independent financial institutions for new collateral against their loans. This was to replace the shares in Glitnir, Landsbanki and Kaupthing which had been pledged as collateral previously and which were now of much lower value, if not worthless. The value of the collateral was estimated at 300 billion krónur (€2 billion). One of the banks, Sparisjóðabanki (SPB, also known as Icebank), stated the next day that it could not provide new collateral for its 68 billion krónur (€451 million) loan, and would have to turn to the government for help. "This problem won't be solved in any other way," said CEO Agnar Hansson.

On 24 October, it emerged that a Norwegian export credit company (Eksportfinansiering) had made a complaint to Norwegian police concerning the alleged embezzlement of 415 million Norwegian kroner (€47 million) by Glitnir since 2006. The Icelandic bank had acted as an agent for Eksportfinans, administering loans to several companies: however Eksportfinans alleges that, when the loans were paid off early by borrowers, Glitnir kept the cash and merely continued with the regular payments to Eksportfinans, effectively taking an unauthorized loan itself.

=== Stock market ===
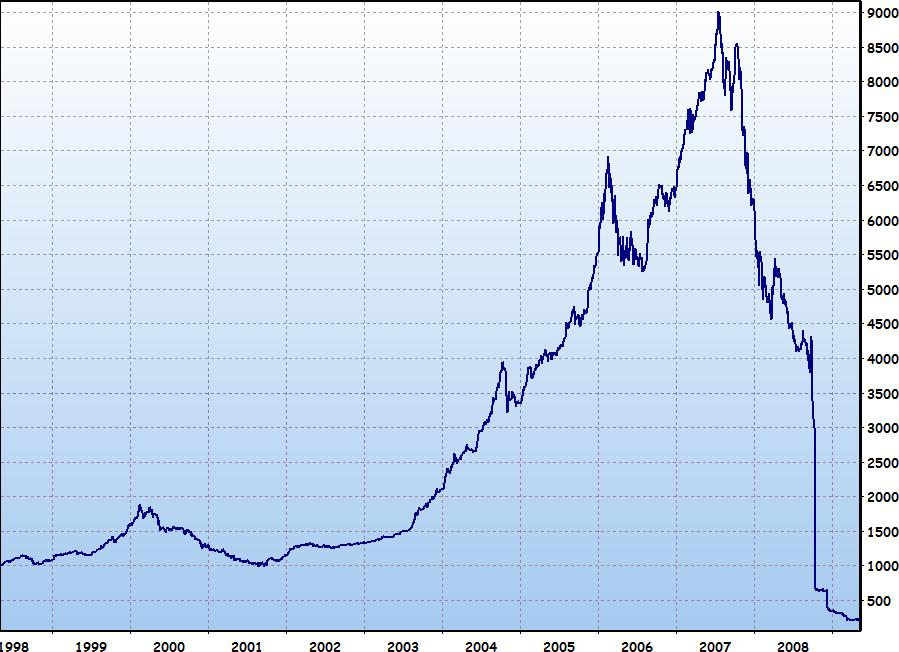
The value of the OMX Iceland 15 from January 1998 to October 2008

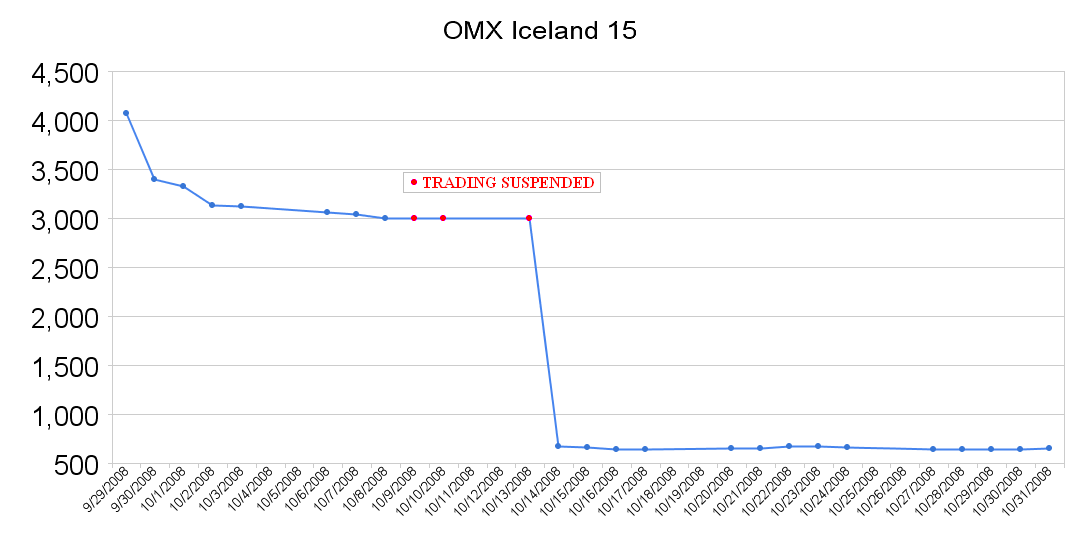
OMX Iceland 15 closing prices during the five trading weeks from 29 September 2008 to 31 October 2008

Trading in shares of six financial companies on the OMX Nordic Iceland Exchange was suspended on 6 October by order of the FME. On Thursday 9 October, all trading on the exchange was frozen for two days by the government "in an attempt to prevent further panic spreading throughout the country's financial markets". The decision was made to do so due to "unusual market conditions", with share prices having fallen 30% since the start of the month. The closure was extended through Monday 13 October due to continuing "unusual market conditions".

The market reopened on 14 October with the main index, the OMX Iceland 15, at 678.4, which corresponds to a plunge of about 77% compared with 3,004.6 before the closure. This reflects the fact that the value of the three big banks, which form 73.2% of the value of the OMX Iceland 15, had been set to zero. The values of other equities varied from +8% to −15%. Trading in shares of Exista, SPRON and Straumur-Burðarás (13.66% of the OMX Iceland 15) remains suspended. After a week of very thin trading, the OMX Iceland 15 closed on 17 October at 643.1, down 93% in króna terms and 96% in euro terms from its historic high of 9016 (18 July 2007).

Trading in the shares of two financial services companies, Straumur–Burðarás and Exista, resumed on 9 December: together the companies account for 12.04% of the OMX Iceland 15. The values of the shares in both companies dropped sharply, and the index closed at 394.88, down by 40.17% on the day. Trading in shares in SPRON and Kaupthing remains suspended, at prices of 1.90 krónur and 694.00 krónur respectively.

=== Sovereign debt ===
Ratings of Icelandic sovereign debt (long-term foreign currency)
Agency	29 Sep 2008	10 Oct 2008
Fitch	A+	BBB–
Moody's	Aa1	A1
R&I	AA	BBB–
S&P	A–	BBB

The four credit rating agencies which monitor Iceland's sovereign debt all lowered their ratings during the crisis, and their outlook for future ratings changes became negative. The Icelandic government had a relatively healthy balance, with sovereign debt of 28% of GDP and a budget surplus of 6% of GDP (2007). More recently, the estimated 2011 debt was 130% of GDP with a budget deficit of 6% of GDP.

In addition, the value of foreign currency bonds which matured in the remainder of 2008 was only $600 million, and foreign currency debt service in 2009 was only $215 million, well within the government's ability to pay. However the agencies believed that the government would have to issue more foreign currency bonds, both to cover losses as the banks' overseas operations are liquidation and also to stimulate demand in the domestic economy as Iceland goes into recession.

A team of experts from the International Monetary Fund (IMF) arrived in Iceland at the start of October 2008 for talks with the government. Industry Minister Össur Skarphéðinsson was said to be "favourable" to help from the IMF to stabilise the króna and to allow interest rates to be lowered.

On 7 October, the central bank of Iceland announced that they had been in talks with the Russian ambassador to Iceland, Victor I. Tatarintsev, over a €4 billion loan from Russia. The loan would be given across three or four years, with an interest rate of 30 to 50 basis points (0.3% to 0.5%) above LIBOR. Central Bank of Iceland governor Davíð Oddsson later clarified that the loan was still being negotiated. According to RÚV, prime minister Geir Haarde had been investigating the possibility of a Russian loan since the mid-summer. When questioned on the matter in a press conference, Geir Haarde said: "We have not received the kind of support that we were requesting from our friends. So in a situation like that one has to look for new friends."

A team of Icelandic negotiators arrived in Moscow on 14 October to discuss the possible loan. Russian deputy finance minister Dmitri Pankin said that "The meeting took place in a friendly atmosphere.... We are working thoroughly on the issue to take a final decision". On the same day, the Central Bank of Iceland drew on its swap facilities with the central banks of Denmark and Norway for €200 million each. Iceland has swap facilities with the other Nordic countries for a total of €1.5 billion. Iceland also sought assistance from the European Central Bank (ECB); there was some precedent for the move at the time, as the ECB already had currency swap arrangements with Switzerland, another non-member of the European Union.

On 24 October, the IMF tentatively agreed to lend €1.58 billion. However the loan had still not been approved by the executive board of the IMF on 13 November. Due to the delay Iceland found itself caught in a classic catch-22 situation, loans from other countries could not be secured until the IMF program had been approved. The Icelandic government spoke of a $500M (€376M) gap in the funding plans. Dutch finance minister Wouter Bos stated that the Netherlands would oppose the loan unless agreement was reached over deposit insurance for Landsbanki customers in the Netherlands.

The IMF-led package of $4.6bn was finally agreed on 19 November, with the IMF loaning $2.1bn and another $2.5bn of loans and currency swaps from Norway, Sweden, Finland and Denmark. In addition, Poland offered to lend $200M and the Faroe Islands also offered $50M, about 3% of the Faroese GDP. The Icelandic government reported that Russia offered to lend $500M, and Poland, $200M. The next day, Germany, the Netherlands and the United Kingdom announced a joint loan of $6.3bn (€5bn), related to the deposit insurance dispute.

== Causes ==
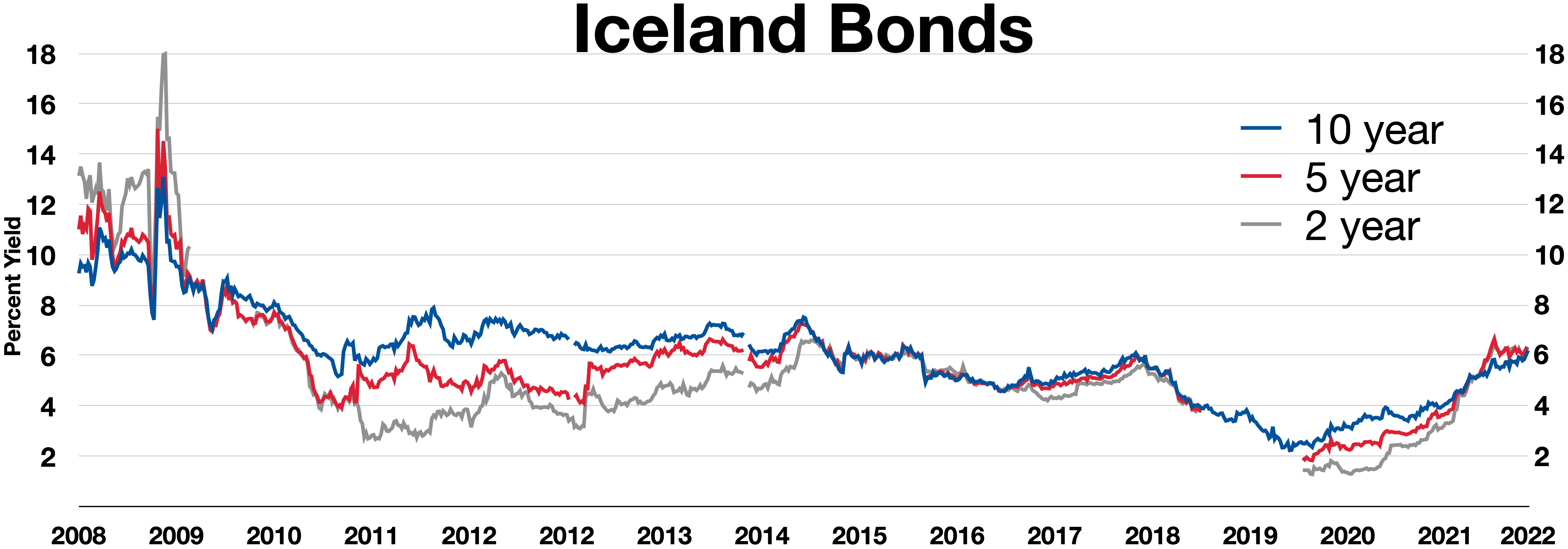
Iceland bonds had an Inverted yield curve in 2008 10 year bonds 5 year bonds 2 year bonds

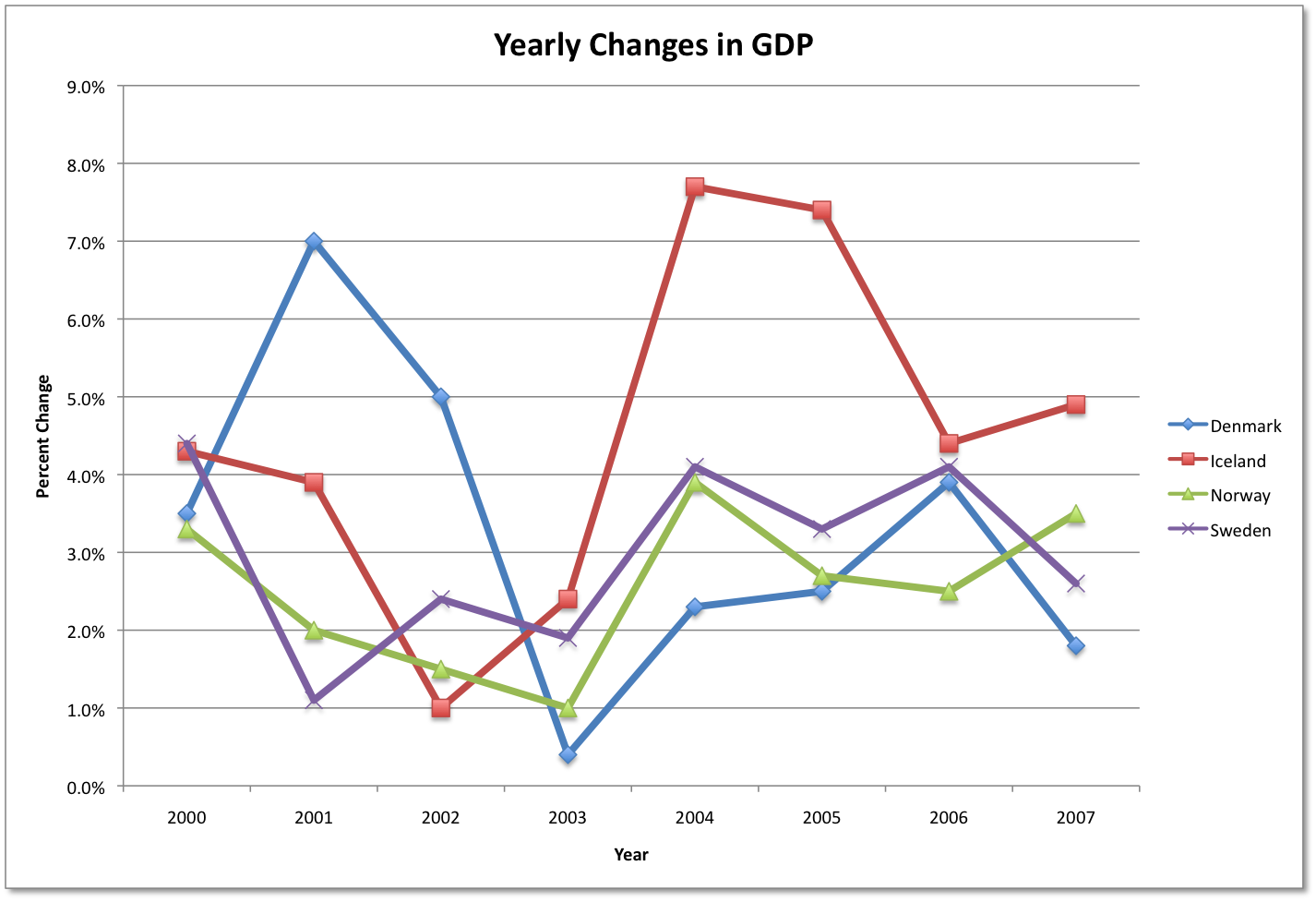
Economic growth in Iceland, Denmark, Norway and Sweden from 2000 to 2007. Iceland is in red.

In 2001, banks were deregulated in Iceland. This set the stage for banks to upload debts when foreign companies were accumulated. The crisis unfolded when these banks became unable to refinance their debts. It is estimated that the three major banks held foreign debt in excess of €50 billion, or about €160,000 per Icelandic resident, compared with Iceland's gross domestic product of €8.5 billion. As early as March 2008, the cost of private deposit insurance for deposits in Landsbanki and Kaupthing was already far higher (6–8 1/2% of the sum deposited) than for other European banks. The króna, which was ranked by The Economist in early 2007 as the most overvalued currency in the world (based on the Big Mac Index), has further suffered from the effects of carry trading.

Coming from a small domestic market, Iceland's banks have financed their expansion with loans on the interbank lending market and, more recently, by deposits from outside Iceland (which are also a form of external debt). Households also took on a large amount of debt, equivalent to 213% of disposable income, which led to inflation. This inflation was exacerbated by the practice of the Central Bank of Iceland issuing liquidity loans to banks on the basis of newly issued, uncovered bonds – effectively, printing money on demand.

In response to the rise in prices – 14% in the twelve months to September 2008, compared with a target of 2.5% – the Central Bank of Iceland held interest rates high (15.5%). Such high interest rates, compared with 5.5% in the United Kingdom or 4% in the eurozone for example, encouraged overseas investors to hold deposits in Icelandic krónur, leading to monetary inflation: the Icelandic money supply (M3) grew 56.5% in the twelve months to September 2008, compared with 5.0% GDP growth. The situation was effectively an economic bubble, with investors overestimating the true value of the króna.

As with many banks around the world, the Icelandic banks found it increasingly difficult or impossible to roll over their loans in the interbank market, their creditors insisting on payment while no other banks were willing to make fresh loans. In such a situation, a bank would normally have to ask for a loan from the central bank as the lender of last resort. However, in Iceland the banks were so much larger than the national economy that the Central Bank of Iceland and the Icelandic government could not guarantee the payment of the banks' debts, leading to the collapse of the banks. The official reserves of the Central Bank of Iceland stood at 374.8 billion krónur at the end of September 2008, compared with 350.3 billion krónur of short-term international debt in the Icelandic banking sector, and at least £6.5 billion (1,250 billion krónur) of retail deposits in the UK.

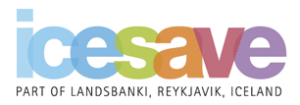
The Icesave logo, advertising it as "part of Landsbanki, Reykjavík, Iceland"

The situation was made worse by the fact that Icesave was operating as a branch of Landsbanki, rather than as a legally independent subsidiary. As such, it was completely dependent on the Central Bank of Iceland for emergency loans of liquidity, and could not turn to the Bank of England for help. The UK Financial Services Authority (FSA) was aware of the risk, and was considering imposing special liquidity requirements on Icelandic deposit-taking banks in the weeks before the crisis. However the plan – which was never implemented – would have forced the Icelandic banks to cut interest rates or stop taking new deposits, and might even have sparked the sort of bank run it was designed to prevent. The Guernsey authorities were also planning on bringing in restrictions on foreign banks operating as branches and on transfers of funds between Guernsey subsidiaries and parent banks ("parental upstreaming"). Landsbanki operated in Guernsey through a legally independent subsidiary.

The existence of a bank run on Landsbanki accounts in the UK in the period up to 7 October seems confirmed by a statement from the bank on 10 October, which said "Landsbanki Íslands hf. transferred substantial funds to its UK branch during this time to fulfil its Icesave commitments." The transfer of funds from Landsbanki Guernsey to Heritable Bank, a Landsbanki subsidiary in the UK, also suggests a bank run in the UK. A transfer of "substantial funds" from Iceland to the UK would have been a significant downward push on the value of the króna, even before the effects of any speculation.

== Bank restructuring ==
Wholesale funding disappeared in September 2008 leading to the collapse of Glitnir, Kaupthing and Landsbanki. Due to the size of the combined balance sheet of the three banks, the government of Iceland did not have the means to save them. They were put into receivership instead with their boards replaced. Nevertheless, the failed banks were restructured by dividing them into a new and an old bank in order to avoid a credit crunch.

The new state-owned banks took over the domestic activities and have been recapitalised by government with a capital ratio of 16% of all assets. The Financial Supervisory Authority (FME) has acted to "ring-fence" the Icelandic operations of Landsbanki and Glitnir, stating its aim of "continued banking operations for Icelandic families and businesses". NBI (originally known as Nýi Landsbanki) was set up on 9 October with 200 billion krónur in equity and 2,300 billion krónur of assets. Nýi Glitnir was set up on 15 October with 110 billion krónur in equity and 1,200 billion krónur of assets. Nýja Kaupþing was set up on 22 October with 75 billion krónur in equity and 700 billion krónur of assets. The equity in all three new banks was supplied by the Icelandic government, and amounted to 30% of Iceland's GDP. The new banks will also have to reimburse their predecessors for the net value of the transferred assets, as determined by "recognised appraisers". As of 14 November 2008, these net values were estimated as: NBI ISK558.1bn (€3.87bn), Nýi Glitnir ISK442.4bn (€2.95bn); Nýja Kaupþing ISK172.3bn (€1.14bn). The total debt of 1173 billion krónur is more than 90% of Iceland's 2007 gross domestic product.

The international businesses remained with the old banks for winding up. Glitnir and Kaupthing, shorn of their Icelandic operations, obtained moratoria on payments to creditors (similar to USA Chapter 11 protection) from the District Court of Reykjavík on 24 November.

The rescue operations of the central bank along with the restructuring and recapitalization of the banks increased the public debt ratio by about 20 percentage points of GDP.

== Effects ==
=== Within Iceland ===
The 2008 economic climate in the country affected many Icelandic businesses and citizens. A new bank was created to replace the insolvent Landsbanki, Landsbankinn (formerly Nýi Landsbanki), causing around 271 employees to lose their jobs due to the restructuring of the organisation, intended to minimise the bank's international operations. Similar job losses occurred at Giltnir and Kaputhing. The job losses can be compared with the 2,136 registered unemployed and 495 advertised vacancies in Iceland at the end of August 2008.

Other companies were also affected. For example, the private Sterling Airlines declared bankruptcy on 29 October 2008. The national airline Icelandair has noticed a significant slump in domestic demand for flights, although it later recovered. Guðjón Arngrímsson, a spokesman for the airline, said "we're getting decent traffic from other markets... we are trying to let the weak króna help us." He has also stated that it is impossible to predict whether the company will be profitable this year. Morgunblaðið, an Icelandic newspaper, cut some jobs and merging parts of its operations with the media corporation 365. The newspaper 24 stundir ceased publication due to the crisis, resulting in the loss of 20 jobs.

Importers were particularly hard hit, with the government restricting foreign currency to essential products such as food, medicines and oil. The €400 million loan from the central banks of Denmark and Norway is sufficient to pay for a month's imports, although on 15 October there was still a "temporary delay" which affected "all payments to and from the country".

The assets of Icelandic pension funds were, according to one expert, expected to shrink by 15–25%. The Icelandic Pension Funds Association announced that benefits would be cut in 2009. Iceland's GDP shrank by 10% as a result of the crisis, putting Iceland by some measures in an economic depression. Inflation climbed as 75% by the end of the year.

Unemployment had more than tripled by late November 2008, with over 7000 registered jobseekers (about 4% of the workforce) compared to just 2136 at the end of August 2008. As 80% of household debt is indexed and another 13% denominated in foreign currencies, debt payment is going to be more costly. Since October 2008, 14% of the workforce have experienced reductions in pay, and around 7% have had their working hours reduced. According to the president of the Icelandic Federation of Labour (ASÍ), Gylfi Arnbjörnsson, these figures are lower than expected. 85% of those registered as unemployed in Iceland stated that they lost their job in October, after the economic collapse.

On 17 July 2009, lawmakers voted 33–28 (with two abstentions) to approve a government plan for Iceland to apply for full European Union membership. Although Iceland (as a member of EFTA) already had a free trade arrangement with the EU, it had always rejected full membership due to concerns that its independence could be compromised. However, Prime Minister Jóhanna Sigurðardóttir, who was elected in April, had promised to bring Iceland into the EU to help stabilize its economy. EU enlargement Commissioner Olli Rehn expressed support for Iceland's membership, stating that as "a country with deep democratic traditions", Iceland will be welcome in the EU's expansion plans. (However, on 13 September 2013 the Government of Iceland dissolved its accession team and suspended its application to join the EU. On 12 March 2015, Foreign Minister of Iceland Gunnar Bragi Sveinsson stated that he had sent a letter to the EU withdrawing the application for membership, without the approval of the Althing, though the European Union stated that Iceland had not formally withdrawn the application.)

The crisis led to a radical shift in the political landscape of Iceland which until this time had been marked by stability. After the effects of the crisis set in, mainstream parties were discredited as newer parties such as the Left Greens and the Pirate Party moved into the mainstream. During the Social Democrat-Left Green coalition (2009-13) the crisis was blamed on corruption and a lack of transparency; in reaction to this the government attempted to reform the constitution and protect the welfare state. Joining the coalition resulted in the Left Greens losing their innocence as a party, resulting in voters punishing them at the 2013 election, at which they lost about half of their voter base. Voters were angry that the government had seemingly bowed to the IMF demands and introduced austerity. Later on in 2016 and 2017 the Left Greens were able to gain back a sizable proportation of their electoral gains by focusing their campaigns on their historical opposition to the Independence Party and oil drilling off the coast as well as arguing that the largest state run bank should be converted into a value based bank.

=== Outside Iceland ===
Over £840 million in cash from more than 100 UK local authorities was invested in Icelandic banks. Representatives from each council met to try to persuade the Treasury to secure the money in the same way that customers' money in Icesave was fully guaranteed. Of all the local authorities, Kent County Council has the most money invested in Icelandic banks, £50 million. Transport for London, the organisation that operates and coordinates transport services within London, also has a large investment at £40 million. Local authorities were working under government advice to invest their money across many national and international banks as a way of spreading risk. Other UK organisations said to have invested heavily include police services and fire authorities, and even the Audit Commission. In October 2008, it was hoped that about one-third of the deposited money will be available fairly rapidly, corresponding to the liquid assets of the UK subsidiaries: liquidation of other assets, such as loans and offices, will take longer.

In an emergency sitting of Tynwald on 9 October 2008, the Isle of Man government raised compensation from 75% of the first £15,000 per depositor to 100% of £50,000 per depositor. The Chief Minister of the Isle of Man, Tony Brown, confirmed that Kaupthing had guaranteed the operations and liabilities of its Manx subsidiary in September 2007, and that the Manx government was pressing Iceland to honour this guarantee. Depositors with Landsbanki on Guernsey found themselves without any depositor protection.

In October 2008, an agreement was reached between the Icelandic and Dutch governments on the savings of about 120,000 Dutch citizens. The Icelandic government agreed to cover the first €20,887 on savings accounts of Dutch citizens held by Landsbanki subsidiary Icesave, using money lent by the Dutch government. The total value of Icesave deposits in the Netherlands were €1.7 billion. At the same time, Iceland and Britain reached an agreement on the general contours of a solution: Icesave deposits in the UK total £4 billion (€5 billion) in 300,000 accounts. The figure of €20,887 was the amount covered by the Icelandic Depositors' and Investors' Guarantee Fund (DIGF; Tryggingarsjóður in Icelandic): however, the DIGF had equity of only 8.3 billion krónur at the end of 2007, €90 million at the exchange rates of the time and far from sufficient to cover the Dutch and British claims.

The cost of deposit insurance in the UK was unclear in November 2008. The Financial Services Compensation Scheme (FSCS) paid around £3 billion to transfer deposits from Heritable Bank and Kaupthing Singer & Friedlander to ING Direct, while the UK Treasury paid an additional £600 million to guarantee retail deposits that were higher than the FSCS limit. The Treasury also paid out £800 million to guarantee Icesave deposits that were higher than the limit. A loan of £2.2 billion to the Icelandic government was expected to cover the claims against the Icelandic DIGF relating to Icesave, while the exposure of the UK FSCS is expected to be £1-2 billion. The Supreme Court of Iceland, in 2011, ordered the repayment of "£4.5bn to the UK and €1.6bn (£1.2bn) by liquidating assets". In January 2016, The Financial Times reported that HM Treasury "had been paid £740m from the Landsbanki estate". This payment by the Landsbanki estate was the final repayment to the UK's treasury, which totaled £4.6bn.

The crisis also prompted the Ministry of Foreign Affairs to reduce its foreign aid to developing nations, from 0.31% to 0.27% of GNP. The effect of the aid cut was greatly amplified by the falling value of the króna: the budget of the Icelandic International Development Agency (ICEIDA) was reduced from US$22 million to $13 million. Since Iceland's foreign aid is targeted in sectors for which the country has particular expertise (e.g., fisheries, geothermal power), the cutbacks will have a substantial impact in countries which receive Icelandic aid – most noticeably in Sri Lanka, where ICEIDA is pulling out altogether.

On 27 February 2009, The Wall Street Journal reported that Iceland's new government was trying to raise $25 million by selling its ambassadorial residences in Washington, New York, London and Oslo.

On 28 August 2009, Iceland's parliament voted 34–15 (with 14 abstentions) to approve a bill (commonly referred to as the Icesave bill) to pay the United Kingdom and the Netherlands more than $5 billion lost in Icelandic deposit accounts. Initially opposed in June, the bill was passed after amendments were added which set a ceiling on the payment based on the country's gross domestic product. Opponents of the bill argued that Icelanders, already reeling from the crisis, should not have to pay for mistakes made by private banks under the watch of other governments. However, the government argued that if the bill failed to pass, the UK and the Netherlands might retaliate by blocking a planned aid package for Iceland from the International Monetary Fund (IMF). Under the deal, up to 4% of Iceland's gross domestic product (GDP) will be paid to the UK, in sterling terms, from 2017 to 2023 while the Netherlands will receive up to 2% of Iceland's GDP, in euro terms, for the same period. Talks between Icelandic, Dutch and UK ministers in January 2010 dubbed as "Icesave" did not result in any specific actions being agreed upon.

== Official investigations ==
=== Special Investigation Commission ===
On 12 December 2008, the Althing established a Special Investigation Commission (SIC), which came to consist of Supreme Court Justice Páll Hreinsson who served as chairman, Parliamentary Ombudsman Tryggvi Gunnarsson and Sigríður Benediktsdóttir associate chair at Yale University, to investigate the causes and lessons of the crisis. The commission released its report on 12 April 2010.

=== Icelandic criminal investigations ===
The Office of the Special Prosecutor was founded with the passage of a bill in the Icelandic parliament 10 December 2008. The aim was to investigate suspected criminal conduct leading up to, in connection with or in the wake of the banking crisis, whether these relate to the activities of financial undertakings, other legal entities or individuals, and, as appropriate, to follow up these investigations by bringing charges in court against those concerned.

In February 2009, Ólafur Hauksson (b. Reykjavík 1964) was appointed; it was the Icelandic government's second attempt to appoint to the role, and Ólafur was one of only two applicants. He had previously been the police chief in Akranes. At the time the unit had four staff members; by September 2013 it had 109, with 140 cases under investigation. By that time, the top managers of all three Icelandic banks which collapsed during the financial crisis had been charged, though the cases progressed slowly. The last active investigation related to the financial crisis concluded in December 2017; 202 cases had been investigated in total over the period, with 23 of them ending up in court. By January 2018, 13 of the court cases ended with guilty verdicts, four with not guilty verdicts and six trials were still pending.

The investigation has been focusing on a number of questionable financial practices engaged in by Icelandic banks:

- Almost half of all the loans made by Icelandic banks were to holdings companies, many of which are connected to those same Icelandic banks.
- Money was allegedly lent by the banks to their employees and associates so they could buy shares in those same banks while simply using those same shares as collateral for the loans. Borrowers were then allowed to defer paying interest on the loan until the end of the period, when the whole amount plus interest accrued was due. These same loans were then allegedly written off days before the banks collapsed.
- Kaupthing allowed a Qatari investor to purchase 5% of its shares. It was later revealed that the Qatari investor "bought" the stake using a loan from Kaupthing itself and a holding company associated with one of its employees (i.e., the bank was, in effect, buying its own shares).

==== Judgments ====
- Businessman Aron Karlsson was sentenced to 2 years in prison by the District Court of Reykjavík for committing fraud in real estate dealings. Aron was made to pay a total of 160–162 million ISK with interest to Arion Bank, Glitnir's winding-up board and Íslandsbanki in addition to all legal costs. The 96–97 million ISK profit of the fraud held by Aron's real estate company, AK fasteignafélag, was confiscated. The Supreme Court of Iceland increased his sentence to 2 1/2 years in prison.
- Baldur Guðlaugsson, permanent secretary of the Ministry of Finance, was sentenced to mandatory 2 years in prison by the District Court of Reykjavík for insider trading. The proceeds of the trade, 192 million ISK (including capital gains tax), were confiscated. The case was remitted to the Supreme Court of Iceland which upheld the ruling. It was the first time a conviction was handed down by a court for insider trading in Iceland.
- Bjarnfreður Ólafsson, Supreme Court attorney, was acquitted by the District Court of Reykjavik for his involvement in the illegal increase in share capitalisation of Exista by 50 billion ISK. The Supreme Court of Iceland suspended his license to practise as attorney for 1 year and sentenced him to 6 months in prison. Out of the 6 months, 3 were suspended for 2 years.
- Bjarni Ármannsson, president of Glitnir, was sentenced to 6 months in prison by the District Court of Reykjavik for major tax noncompliance. His sentence was suspended and he was additionally ordered to repay nearly 36 million ISK of unpaid tax. The Supreme Court of Iceland increased his suspended sentence to 8 months.
- Elín Sigfúsdóttir, managing director of Corporate Banking of Landsbanki, was acquitted by the District Court of Reykjavik for her involvement in the Imon case. The Supreme Court of Iceland overturned the ruling and sentenced Elín to 18 months in prison for her involvement in the Imon case.
- Friðfinnur Ragnar Sigurðsson, managing director of Markets of Glitnir, was sentenced to a mandatory 1 year in prison by the District Court of Reykjanes for insider trading. The ruling also subjected him to a 19.2 million ISK asset confiscation The Supreme Court of Iceland decreased his sentence to 9 months in prison and 7.1 million ISK in asset confiscation on the ground that Friðfinnur was a first-time offender. Out of the 9 months, 6 were suspended for 2 years.
- Guðmundur Hjaltason, managing director of Corporate Banking of Glitnir, was sentenced to 9 months in prison by the District Court of Reykjavík for a major breach of trust. Out of the 9 months, 6 were suspended for 2 years. The Supreme Court of Iceland acquitted Guðmundur.
- Hannes Þór Smárason, chairman and president of FL Group, was compelled by the District Court of Reykjavik to pay 2 billion ISK to Landsbanki because of a contract of suretyship he signed in 2007. Hannes was acquitted by the District Court of Reykjavik for the alleged embezzlement of 3 billion ISK when he transferred money from FL Group's account to the holding company Fons. The Special Prosecutor appealed to the Supreme Court of Iceland.
- Hreiðar Már Sigurðsson, president of Kaupthing Bank, was sentenced to mandatory 5 1/2 years in prison by the District Court of Reykjavik for his involvement in the Al-Thani case. Following an appeal, the sentence was upheld on 12 February 2015 by Iceland's supreme court.
- Jón Þorsteinn Jónsson, chairman of Byr Savings Bank, was acquitted by the District Court of Reykjavik for his involvement in the Exeter case. The Supreme Court of Iceland overturned the ruling and sentenced Jón to 4 1/2 years in prison for breach of trust in the Exeter case.
- Lárus Welding, CEO of Glitnir, was sentenced to 9 months in prison by the District Court of Reykjavík for a major breach of trust. Out of the 9 months, 6 were suspended for 2 years. The Supreme Court of Iceland acquitted Lárus.
- Lýður Guðmundsson, chairman of Exista, was fined 2 million ISK by the District Court of Reykjavik for his involvement in the illegal increase in share capitalisation of Exista by 50 billion ISK. The Special Prosecutor appealed to the Supreme Court of Iceland which sentenced him to 8 months in prison. Out of the 8 months, 5 are suspended for 2 years.
- Magnús Guðmundsson, president of Kaupthing Bank in Luxembourg, was sentenced to mandatory 3 years in prison by the District Court of Reykjavik for his involvement in the Al-Thani case; following an appeal, the sentence increased to four-and-a-half years on 12 February 2015 by Iceland's supreme court.
- Ólafur Ólafsson, a shareholder of Kaupthing Bank, was sentenced to mandatory 3 1/2 years in prison by the District Court of Reykjavik for his involvement in the Al-Thani case; following an appeal, the sentence increased to four and a half years on 12 February 2015 by Iceland's supreme court.
- Ragnar Zophonías Guðjónsson, president of Byr Savings Bank, was acquitted by the District Court of Reykjavik for his involvement in the Exeter case. The Supreme Court of Iceland overturned the ruling and sentenced Ragnar to 4 1/2 years in prison for breach of trust in the Exeter case.
- Sigurður Einarsson, chairman of Kaupthing Bank, was sentenced to mandatory 5 years in prison by the District Court of Reykjavik for his involvement in the Al-Thani case; following an appeal, he was sentenced to four years on 12 February 2015 by Iceland's supreme court.
- Sigurjón Þ. Árnason, president of Landsbanki, was acquitted by the District Court of Reykjavik for his involvement in the Imon case. The Supreme Court of Iceland overturned the ruling and sentenced Sigurjón to 3 1/2 years in prison for his involvement in the Imon case.
- Steinþór Gunnarsson, managing director of Brokerage of Landsbanki, was sentenced to 9 months in prison by the District Court of Reykjavík for market manipulation in the Imon case. Out of the 9 months, 6 were suspended.
- Styrmir Þór Bragason, president of MP Bank, was twice acquitted by the District Court of Reykjavik for his involvement in the Exeter case. The Supreme Court of Iceland overturned the ruling and sentenced Styrmir to 1 year in prison for breach of trust in the Exeter case.

=== Arrests by UK Serious Fraud Office ===
On 9 March 2011, Robert and Vincent Tchenguiz were arrested in London by the UK's Serious Fraud Office as part of their ongoing investigation in conjunction with Iceland's Special Prosecutor's Office into the collapse of Icelandic Bank Kaupthing. Neither was, however, indicted, and in fact they sued the Serious Fraud Office for wrongful arrest, receiving large sums in compensation.

== Scrutiny of Icelandic business leaders ==
Since the crisis began, many of Iceland's business leaders, who had previously been considered financial gurus who greatly developed Iceland's economy, are now under intense public scrutiny for their roles in causing the financial crisis:

- Jón Ásgeir Jóhannesson and Jóhannes Jónsson, the owners of the Baugur Group retail empire, which includes Hamleys, House of Fraser, The Oasis Centre and a large portion of Iceland's media. Jón Ásgeir, who had been known as the "popstar businessman" due to his shaggy golden mullet, has become the subject of a satirical video on YouTube set to the theme of the movie The Godfather. In addition, a former mistress later revealed details of his "playboy lifestyle" during a trial that found him guilty of false accounting (which prompted the Baugur Group to relocate to the United Kingdom).
- Lýður Guðmundsson and Águst Guðmundsson, the frozen food entrepreneurs who were in charge of Kaupthing.
- Björgólfur Thor Björgólfsson and Björgólfur Guðmundsson, the shipping and brewing moguls who owned Landsbanki.

Reportedly, all of those under scrutiny are now rarely seen in public and some have apparently left the country. They are also reportedly the subjects of an ongoing investigation to determine if any of their business practices warrant criminal prosecution.

== Statements from former politicians ==
Former Prime Minister Davíð Oddsson has claimed that Iceland needs to investigate "unusual and unconventional loans" given by the banks to senior politicians during the years before the crisis.

Björn Bjarnson, the former Minister for Justice and Ecclesiastical Affairs, has started a blog detailing the problems with the business sector and the efforts to cover them up. This was cited as an example of how politicians and businessmen, who traditionally held a tight grip over the Icelandic media, have lost this control and that dozens of similar blogs have been created. Björn stated that:

"I have written a lot about problems in the business sector over the last 14 years, and I can only compare some parts of it to Enron. Here companies have been playing a game, using the media and publishing to make themselves look good. We only hope that the foreign media will soon begin to understand what has been going on".

== Political aftermath ==
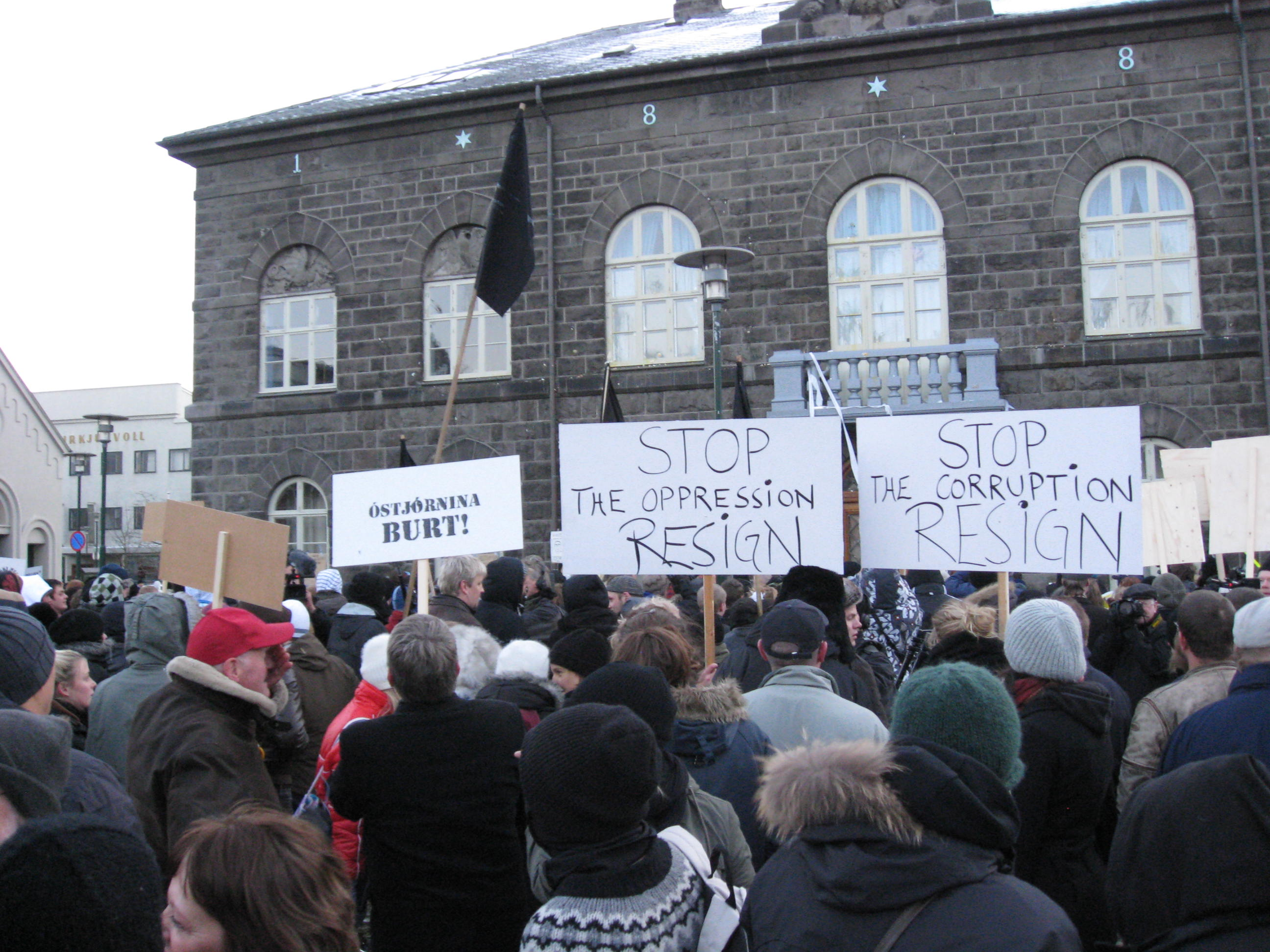
Some of the 6000 protesters in front of the Alþingishús, seat of the Icelandic parliament, on 15 November 2008.

Parts of the Icelandic public have arranged protests against the Central Bank, the Parliament and the government's alleged lack of responsibility before and after the crisis, attracting between 3000 and 6000 people (1–2% of Iceland's population) on Saturdays.

In early November 2008, the President of Iceland, Ólafur Ragnar Grímsson, at an informal lunch with foreign diplomats, criticized Iceland's traditional friends (particularly Britain, Sweden and Denmark) as well as the International Monetary Fund. According to a memo from the Norwegian embassy, he suggested that the Russians might want to use the Keflavík Air Base, the Russian ambassador replied that they had no need for it. The President is quoted to have said that Iceland would soon recover, even if they had to fight alone. The President does not necessarily agree with the government on these issues.

In October 2008, the UK PM Gordon Brown used provisions in part 2 of the Anti-Terrorism, Crime and Security Act 2001 to freeze Landsbanki holdings in the United Kingdom. Iceland's prime minister Geir Haarde protested against what he described as "a terrorist law being applied against us", calling it "a completely unfriendly act". Angered by the British decision, Iceland decided to submit a formal complaint to NATO about their move, and it also provoked more than 80,000 Icelanders (equal to 25% of its entire population) to sign an online petition set up under the heading "Icelanders are not terrorists". The relationship got even tenser when UK replied a month later by cancelling its scheduled patrol of the Icelandic airspace in December 2008. Iceland has no standing army of its own, and relies on a long-term standing agreement with NATO where a group of member states have committed in turns to defend the Icelandic airspace, and the UK Royal Air Force had now cancelled this after mutual agreement with NATO.

According to a poll from late November 2008, 64% were in favour of early elections, with only 29.3% opposed. In a poll from 22 November 2008, the Social Democratic Alliance led with 33.6%, followed by the Left-Green Alliance at 27.8% and the Independence Party at 24.8%; the Progressive Party and the Liberal Party were far behind, with only 6.3% and 4.3%, respectively.

As the Parliament met again on 20 January 2009, there were protests with reinvigorated force and escalation of conflict between protesters and the police. On 22 January, police used tear gas to disperse people on Austurvöllur (the square in front of the Alþing), the first such use since the 1949 anti-NATO protest.

=== Government resignation ===
Prime Minister Geir H. Haarde announced on 23 January 2009 that he would be stepping down as leader of the Independence Party for health reasons: he had been diagnosed as having a malignant oesophageal tumour. He said he would travel to the Netherlands around the end of January for treatment. Education Minister and Independence Party vice-chairman Þorgerður Katrín Gunnarsdóttir was to serve as Prime Minister in his absence. The leader of the Social Democratic Alliance, Foreign Minister Ingibjörg Sólrún Gísladóttir, was also unwell, undergoing treatment for a benign brain tumour since September 2008. The government recommended that elections be held on 9 May 2009.

Björgvin G. Sigurðsson, Iceland's Commerce Minister, resigned on 25 January, citing the pressures of the nation's economic collapse, as the country's political leaders failed to agree on how to lead country out of its financial crisis. One of his last acts as minister was to dismiss the director of the Financial Supervisory Authority (FSA). Björgvin acknowledged that Icelanders have lost faith in their government and political system. "I want to shoulder my part of the responsibility for that," he said.

Negotiations on continuing the coalition broke down the next day, apparently over demands from the Social Democratic Alliance to take over the leadership of the government, and Geir Haarde tendered the government's resignation to the President of Iceland, Ólafur Ragnar Grímsson. The President asked the present government to continue until a new government can be formed, and held talks with the five political parties represented in the Althing.

After these discussions, Ingibjörg Sólrún Gísladóttir of the Social Democratic Alliance and Steingrímur J. Sigfússon of the Left-Green Movement were asked by the President to negotiate the formation of a new coalition government. Such a coalition would be five seats short of an overall majority in the Althing, but the Progressive Party (seven seats) was expected to support the coalition without actually joining the government. Neither party leader became Prime Minister: instead, the position went to Jóhanna Sigurðardóttir of the Social Democratic Alliance, then the Minister of Social Affairs and Social Security, who became the new chairwoman of her party on 28 March 2009.

On 8 April 2009, former Prime Minister Geir H. Haarde stated that he was solely responsible for accepting controversial donations to the Icelandic Independence Party in 2006, ISK 30 million from the investment group FL Group, and ISK 25 million from Landsbanki.

Geir was strongly criticized in the April 2010 report of the Special Investigative Commission into the financial collapse, being accused of "negligence" along with three other ministers of his government. Iceland's parliament voted 33–30 to indict Geir, but not the other ministers, on charges of negligence in office at a session on 28 September 2010. He stood trial before the Landsdómur, a special court to hear cases alleging misconduct in government office: it was the first time the Landsdómur had convened since it was established in the 1905 Constitution. The trial began in Reykjavik on 5 March 2012. Geir Haarde was found guilty on one of four charges on 23 April 2012, for not holding cabinet meetings on important state matters. Landsdómur said Mr. Haarde would face no punishment, as this was a minor offence.

== Crisis resolution ==
=== Recovery starting in 2011 ===
Iceland's financial position has steadily improved since the crash. The economic contraction and rise in unemployment appear to have been arrested by late 2010 and with growth under way in mid-2011. Four main factors have been important in this regard. First is the emergency legislation passed by the Icelandic parliament in October 2008. It served to minimise the impact of the 2008 financial crisis on the country. The Financial Supervisory Authority of Iceland used permission granted by the emergency legislation to take over the domestic operations of the three largest banks. The much larger foreign operations of the banks, however, went into receivership.

A second important factor is the success of the IMF Stand-By-Arrangement in the country since November 2008. The SBA includes three pillars. The first pillar is a program of medium term fiscal consolidation, involving painful austerity measures and significant tax hikes. The result has been that central government debts have been stabilised at around 80–90 percent of GDP. A second pillar is the resurrection of a viable but sharply downsized domestic banking system on the ruins of its gargantuan international banking system which the government was unable to bail out. A third pillar is the enactment of capital controls and the work to gradually lift these to restore normal financial linkages with the outside world. An important result of the emergency legislation and the SBA is that the country has not been seriously affected by the Euro area crisis. Despite a contentious debate with Britain and the Netherlands over the question of a state guarantee on the Icesave deposits of Landsbanki in these countries, credit default swaps on Icelandic sovereign debt have steadily declined from over 1000 points prior to the crash in 2008 to around 200 points in June 2011. The fact that the assets of the failed Landsbanki branches were estimated to cover most of the depositor claims had an influence to ease concerns over the situation.

The third major factor behind the resolution of the financial crisis was the decision by the government of Iceland to apply for membership in the EU in July 2009. While views on the feasibility of EU membership are quite mixed in Iceland, this action has served to enhance the credibility of the country on international financial markets. One sign of the success of the above efforts is the fact that the Icelandic government was successfully able to raise $1 billion with a bond issue on 9 June 2011. This development indicates that international investors have given the government and the new banking system, with two of the three biggest banks now in foreign hands, a clean bill of health. The first two major measures were implemented by the government of Geir H. Haarde but also carried out by the government of Johanna Sigurdardottir, which then took the step to apply for EU membership.

Finally, the fourth major factor was the sharp rise in foreign tourism, which pumped a large amount of money into the economy; this tourism boom was caused primarily by the 2010 eruptions of Eyjafjallajökull and the rise in popularity of Game of Thrones, which had some scenes that were filmed in Iceland.

Iceland has undertaken recapitalization of lenders such as injection of ISK 33 billion (2.1% of 2010 GDP) into Housing Financing Fund at the end of 2010, under a restructuring plan approved by the EFTSA.

=== Aftermath (2012–2013) ===
By mid-2012 Iceland was regarded as one of Europe's recovery success stories. It has had two years of economic growth. Unemployment was down to 6.3% and Iceland was attracting immigrants to fill jobs. Currency devaluation effectively reduced wages by 50% making exports more competitive and imports more expensive. Ten-year government bonds were issued below 6%, lower than some of the PIIGS nations in the EU (Portugal, Italy, Ireland, Greece, and Spain). Tryggvi Thor Herbertsson, a member of parliament, noted that adjustments via currency devaluations are less painful than government labor policies and negotiations. Nevertheless, while EU fervor has cooled the government continued to pursue membership.

Iceland elected a new government in April 2013, which as one of their top priorities wanted to negotiate a debt haircut towards foreign creditors of the three failed Icelandic banks now in receivership, as part of a deal to lift the long enforced (since November 2008) capital controls. The 2013 controls ban a swap/exchange of ISK denominated assets to foreign currency, and so by effect has trapped repayment of ISK denominated assets to the creditors – which in theory mean they should be interested to accept a haircut in return for getting the capital controls lifted. The Icelandic government intent somehow to route the saved money from the negotiated debt haircut for creditors into a national household debt relief fund, enabling a 20% debt relief for all household mortgages. In July 2013, Standard & Poors recommended Iceland to drop the debt relief initiative, as it would only result in increased debt for the government – making it even more difficult to lend at credit markets, and it was forecasted also to ignite high inflation along with an economic recession equal to a GDP detraction of 10%. The government has nevertheless appointed a taskforce to present proposals on how best to achieve the government's goal about implementing a combined capital control abolition and debt relief for households, with a reporting deadline in October 2013. Capital controls were eventually ended in March 2017.

A significant amount of the capital trapped in Iceland by the capital controls was channelled into property investment, partly by the financial management company Gamma, and was one factor that fuelled rising property prices in Iceland after the crash.

The Icelandic Prime Minister commissioned Frosti Sigurjónsson to study Iceland's monetary system. In the 2015 report, Sigurjónsson argued the central bank was unable to contain the credit boom and proposed sovereign money reform.

=== COVID-19 ===
According to the IMF, the reforms implemented in response to the financial crisis strengthened banking supervision, capital requirements, and financial stability and helped the country’s banks remain resilient during the COVID-19 pandemic- which severely disrupted tourism, the main contributor to the Icelandic economy since 2012.

== See also ==
- 1991 Indian economic crisis
- 2008 financial crisis
- 2008–2012 California budget crisis
- 2010 Icelandic loan guarantees referendum
- 2011 Icelandic loan guarantees referendum
- Banking in Iceland
- Darien scheme
- Economy of Iceland
- Iceland - IMF relations
- Icelandic outvasion
- List of banks acquired or bankrupted during the Great Recession
- List of stock market crashes and bear markets
- Stock market crash
- Stock market crashes in India
- Swedish banking rescue
- The Report of the Althingi Special Investigation Commission
- Timeline of the Icelandic financial crisis
