= List of nationalizations by country =

This is a list of industries, services, products, or companies that have been nationalized at various times, grouped by country.

== List ==
=== Argentina ===
- 1946 Central Bank of Argentina
- 1946 Natural gas services (later privatized in 1992)
- 1947 Telephone network (later privatized in 1990)
- 1947 Radio networks (later privatized between 1980 and 1993)
- 1948 Rail transport (privatized between 1991 and 1999)
- 1959 Oil reserves (the state oil enterprise, YPF, had been established in 1922; mineral resources were nationalized with Article 40 of the 1949 Constitution; the latter was abrogated in 1956, but oil was renationalized in 1958 and private firms operated afterward via leases)
- 1949 Port administration (privatized in 1992)
- 1949 Merchant marine (privatized in 1991)
- 1951 LR3 TV Canal 7 (the first and only existing television network in the country at the time; despite not being founded by the state itself, it began as a state-owned venture. It was briefly privatized in 1954 and renationalized in 1955)
- 1952 Buenos Aires Metro (operations privatized in 1994)
- 1958 Electric utilities (privatized in 1992)
- 1974 Television networks (privatized between 1982 and 1998)
- 1980 Austral Líneas Aéreas (privatized in 1987, renationalized in 2008)
- 2003 Postal service renationalized (state-owned between 1949 and 1997)
- 2006 AySA, the water utility serving Buenos Aires (its state-owned precursor, OSN, was established in 1912 and privatized in 1993)
- 2008 Aerolíneas Argentinas renationalized (state-owned between 1949 and 1990)
- 2008 Pension funds (transferred to ANSES)
- 2010 FAdeA (state-owned between 1927 and 1995)
- 2012 YPF renationalized (state-owned between 1922 and 1993)
- 2013 Metrogas (part of the Gas del Estado state-owned enterprise privatized in 1992)
- 2015 Rail transport (renationalization of commuter lines began under the auspices of SOFSE in 2013)

=== Australia ===
- 1946 The South Australian Government nationalised the Adelaide Electricity Supply Company into the Electricity Trust of South Australia
- 1948 The government attempted to nationalize the banking industry, but the act was declared unconstitutional by the High Court of Australia in the case Bank of New South Wales v Commonwealth.
- 2023 The Government of the Australian Capital Territory nationalised Calvary Hospital, Canberra.

=== Bahrain ===
- 1975-1980 Nationalisation in three steps of Bahrain Petroleum Company, originally founded in Canada in 1929 by Standard Oil of California. The company had found oil in Bahrain in 1932 and was wholly nationalized 48 years later.

=== Bangladesh ===
- 1971 The State Bank of Bangladesh was founded by nationalization of the private shares in the eastern section of the State Bank of Pakistan.
- 1972-1974 Through this three years period after independence of Bangladesh in 1971, the government had taken over 786 industrial undertakings. Included in this number, the government nationalized 245 enterprises in 11 industries: 76 jute mills, 52 textile mills, 30 textile tanneries, 17 engineering companies, 16 food producers, 15 sugar mills, 10 paper industry companies, 9 companies within the fertilizer, pharma and chemical industries, 8 steel companies, 6 oil and gas companies, and 6 forest industry undertakings. A further 375 state-owned enterprises were founded in the same period, but 320 of them were placed for later re-privatization to Bengali owners, of which 211 had been privatized by 1978.
- 1972 On March 26, 1972, the Government of Bangladesh formally took over all assets having belonged to (West) Pakistani citizens. Many enterprises expropriated 1971-1974 were owned by West Pakistanis (citizens of present-day Pakistan) who had fled the country during war and liberation. This included all jute exports and 6 private shipping companies.
- 1972 On March 26, 1972, the government nationalised 12 commercial banks belonging to both (West) Pakistani and Bangladeshi shareholders.
- 1975 A reversal of policies started, with large-scale divestment of state-owned enterprises and reimbursement of compensation to previous private owners.
- 1977 This year, a total of 371 of the previously nationalized enterprises, still remained under state ownership. Approximately 400 companies had been de-nationalised and transferred to private owners.

=== Bolivia ===
- 1952 Bolivian nationalization of tin mining as part of the Bolivian National Revolution

Most utilities were nationally owned before being privatized in 1994.

- 2006 On May 1, 2006, newly elected Bolivian president Evo Morales announced plans to nationalize the country's natural gas industry; foreign-based companies were given six months to renegotiate their existing contracts.
- 2008 On May 1, 2008, the nationalization of Bolivia's leading telecommunications company Entel was completed, previously having been owned by Telecom Italia.
- 2010 On May 1, 2010, the government nationalized the country's main hydroelectric plant, thereby assuming control over most of Bolivia's electrical generation and end-user sales.
- 2012 On May 1, 2012, the Morales government nationalized power grid operator Transportadora de Electricidad (TDE), until then 99.94% owned by Red Eléctrica de España. TDE owns and runs 73% of the power lines in Bolivia.

=== Canada ===
- 1918 Canadian National Railways, created from several systems nationwide following their bankruptcy during and after World War I, and since privatised in 1995. (Air Canada, Canadian Broadcasting Corporation, Marine Atlantic and Via Rail (still government-owned) were all subsidiaries of the company at one time)
- 1943 Eldorado Resources, private radium and uranium mining company nationalized by the Canadian federal government after it was contracted to supply uranium for the Manhattan Project. Privatized after merging with the Saskatchewan Mining Development Corporation to form Cameco in 1988.
- 1944 Hydro-Québec, first created through partial nationalisation of electricity concerns around Montreal in Quebec by the Liberal government of Adélard Godbout. During the Quiet Revolution of the early 1960s, the remaining 11 privately owned electricity companies in Quebec were nationalised by the Liberal government of Jean Lesage.
- 1975 Potash Corporation of Saskatchewan, Province of Saskatchewan nationalised part of the potash industry. Many potash producers agreed to sell to the government instead of being nationalised.

=== Chile ===
- 1970–1971 Chilean nationalization of steel and iron mining industry.
- 1966–1971 Chilean nationalization of copper mining industry, after a unanimous modification to the Constitution by the Chilean Congress on 11 July 1971, nationalising the operations of the US companies Anaconda, Kennecott, and Cerro. The act was carried out by the Socialist government of Salvador Allende.
- 2023–present Chilean nationalization of lithium extraction.

=== China ===
In the period of Republican China, Sun Yat-sen had sweeping land reforms and nationalized many industries. The rise of the People's Republic of China under Mao Zedong nationalized all private assets, restricted private ownership, even of land, and the state determined output and price levels. Some of these were reversed after Deng Xiaoping launched the reform and opening up in 1978, allowing private and foreign investment to enter the country.

After the end of martial law period and democratization in Taiwan, the Republic of China began to privatize many government-owned assets, even those owned by the Kuomintang.

=== Colombia ===
- 1998 Granahorrar Bank nationalization

=== Croatia ===
On the break-up of Yugoslavia, The HDZ government nationalized private agricultural property and rezoned it under the guise of forest statesmanship, when their publicly professed agenda was to only complete the nationalization of the communists. Much of this land is in the process of being reinstated and the model rethought.

=== Cuba ===
After the Cuban Revolution of 1959 the Castro government gradually expropriated all foreign-owned private companies, most of which were owned by American corporations and individuals. The immediate trigger was the refusal by American-owned oil refineries to refine the crude oil received from the Soviet Union. Faced with the prospect of no oil, Cuba nationalized the three American refineries. This action escalated the US embargo on Cuba, which responded by nationalizing all American owned property. Eventually all Cuban private property was nationalized.

Beginning in 1966, the Castro government nationalized all remaining privately owned businesses in Cuba, down to the level of street vendors. The process accelerated on March 14, 1968, with a new "revolutionary offensive."

Castro had offered bonds at 4.5% interest over twenty years to U.S. companies, but U.S. ambassador Philip Bonsal requested the compensation up front and rejected the offer. A minor amount of $1.3 million, was paid to U.S. interests before deteriorating relations ended all cooperation between the two governments. The U.S. established a registry of claims against the Cuban government, ultimately developing files on 5,911 specific companies. The Cuban government has refused to discuss the compensation of U.S. claims and the U.S. government continues to insist on compensation for U.S. companies.

=== Czechoslovakia ===
- 1945 Large manufacturing enterprise nationalized by the National Front government.
- 1948 All manufacturing enterprises nationalized by Klement Gottwald's Communist government after the 1948 Czechoslovak coup d'état.

=== Egypt ===
- 1956 In the Suez Crisis, on July 26, 1956 Egyptian President Gamal Abdel Nasser nationalized the Suez Canal Company's assets in Egypt, including the Suez Canal, and placed them under the control of the Suez Canal Authority.

=== Finland ===
- 1993 A minor part of the banking sector is nationalized, Omaisuudenhoitoyhtiö Arsenal was created to solve the banking crisis.
- 2015: Talvivaara Sotkamo Ltd which operated a nickel mine in Sotkamo, went bankrupt in November 2014, and the Finnish state immediately took over the mine in order to stabilize the mine's operations in order to prevent environmental damage. Terrafame, which is wholly owned by the Finnish state, bought the mine from the bankruptcy estate for one euro in August 2015. Since then, efforts have been made to privatize the mine. The state's holding in November 2020 was still 71.2%.

=== France ===
Nationalisation dates back to the 'regies' or state monopolies organized under the Ancien Régime, for example, the monopoly on tobacco sales. Communications companies France Telecom and La Poste are relics of the state postal and telecommunications monopolies.

There was a major expansion of the nationalised sector following World War II. A second wave followed in 1982.

- 1938 Société Nationale des Chemins de Fer Français (SNCF) (originally a 51% State holding, increased to 100% in 1982)
- 1945 Several nationalisations in France, including most important banks (Crédit lyonnais, le Comptoir national d'escompte de Paris and the Société générale among others), the schemes and companies comprising the insurance sector, and the car-maker Renault. The firm was seized for Louis Renault's alleged collaboration with Nazi Germany, although this condemnation was without judgement and after his death, making this case remarkable and rare. A later judgement (1949) admitted that Renault's plant never collaborated. Renault was successful and profitable whilst nationalised and remains successful today, after having been partially privatized in 1996. France increased its 15% minority share holding in Renault to 19% in 2015.
- 1946 Charbonnages de France, Electricite de France (EdF), Gaz de France (GdF) nationalized as établissements public à caractère industriel et commercial
- 1982 François Mitterrand's proposals in the 110 Propositions for France and alliance with Jean-Pierre Chevènement's Socialist Party faction CERES, committed France to an explicitly socialist ‘rupture with capitalism’. Full nationalisation (100%): the Compagnie Générale d'Electricité, the Compagnie Générale de Constructions Téléphoniques, Pechiney-Ugine-Kuhlmann, Rhône-Poulenc, Saint-Gobain-Pont-à-Mousson, Thompson-Brandt. Partial nationalisation (51%+): Dassault, Honeywell-Bull, Matra, Roussel-Uclaf, Sacilor, Usinor. Thirty-nine banks, two financial houses, and the remaining 49% of the SNCF were also nationalised, taking the size of the French state to unprecedented levels within a year of Mitterrand's election as president in 1981.

The Paris regional transport operator, RATP Group, can also be counted as a nationalised industry.

=== Germany ===
The railways were nationalised after World War I. Partial privatisation of Deutsche Bahn was planned in 2008 but stopped due to the World Economic Crisis. As of 2020 there are no plans for privatisation.

Large sections of the mining, banking, and shipping industries either became dependent on government money or were placed entirely under care of the Weimar Republic in the wake of the Great Depression; these were later reprivatized between 1934 and 1937 by the Nazi regime.

In Nazi Germany, private businessmen had the ability to influence government policy, and most of them remained committed to the principle of Gewerbefreiheit – business freedom – seeking to prevent any nationalization of industry. Nevertheless, as the Nazi government confiscated the assets of conquered nations during World War II, over 500 state enterprises were expanded to absorb those assets, one of the largest being the Hermann Göring Works (iron), mostly operated by the Nazi Party apparatus.

In East Germany, most enterprises were nationalised in the years following World War II. After German reunification, an agency called Treuhand was established to return them to private ownership, however many were liquidated.

- 2008 Renationalization of the "Bundesdruckerei" (Federal Print Office), which had been privatized in 2001.
- 2022 Nationalised Gazprom Germania assets as Securing Energy for Europe
- 2022 Nationalised Rosneft's German assets as Securing Energy for Europe

=== Greece ===
- 1974 Nationalization of Olympic Airlines, main airline of Greece. Its founder, Aristotle Onassis, sold all his shares to the Greek state.
- 2011 Proton Bank is effectively nationalized in the midst of the Greek government-debt crisis

=== Guernsey ===
- 2003 Aurigny Air Services was bought by the States of Guernsey to keep important routes from the island to Gatwick Airport.

=== Iceland ===
- 2008 Renationalization of Iceland's largest commercial banks: Kaupþing, Landsbanki, Glitnir and Icebank.
- 2009 Nationalization of Straumur Investment Bank and the savings bank SPRON.

=== India ===
- 1949 (1 January) Reserve Bank of India nationalised. The Reserve Bank of India was state-owned at the time of Indian independence.
- 1953 Air India under the Air Corporations Act 1953.
- 1955 Imperial Bank of India and its subsidiaries (State Bank of India and its subsidiaries)
- 1969 Nationalization of 14 Indian banks.
- 1972 Nationalisation and restructuring of 107 insurance companies under the General Insurance Corporation of India.
- 1973 Coal industry under Coal India Limited and the oil and gas industry under the Oil and Natural Gas Corporation.
- 1980 Another six banks nationalized.

=== Indonesia ===
- 1953 Bank of Java nationalized, after nationalization this bank became Bank Indonesia
- 1957 During the height of Western New Guinea dispute, Dutch companies were nationalized.
- 1964 During the height of Konfrontasi, British companies were nationalized.
- 1998 Four banks were nationalized as a result of the 1997 Asian financial crisis: Bank Danamon, Bank BCA, Bank Tiara Asia, and Bank PDFCI.

=== Iran ===
- 1953 Iranian Prime Minister Mohammed Mossadegh nationalized the Anglo-Iranian Oil Company in Iran. After the 1953 Iranian coup d'état it was reprivatized as an international consortium eventually known as the "Seven Sisters."
- 1953 Iranian Prime Minister Mohammed Mossadegh nationalized all buses in Iran.

=== Ireland ===
1940s
Railways nationalised as Córas Iompair Éireann.
2007
On 3 August 2007, the Irish government were offered a stake in Eircom's copper network infrastructure. Ireland's telephone networks were privatised in 1999.
2009
On 16 January 2009, the Irish Government nationalised Anglo Irish Bank to secure the bank's viability.
2010
State-owned Anglo Irish Bank is to take majority control of one of Ireland's largest companies QUINN group bringing it under Public ownership.

=== Israel ===
- 1983 Nationalization of the major banks: Bank Hapoalim, Bank Leumi, Discount Bank, Mizrachi Bank due to the Bank stock crisis that struck in 1983.

=== Italy ===
1905
The railways were nationalised as Ferrovie dello Stato.
1922-39
The regime of Benito Mussolini extended nationalisation, creating the Istituto per la Ricostruzione Industriale (IRI) as a State holding company for struggling firms, including the car maker Alfa Romeo. A parallel body, Ente Nazionale Idrocarburi (Eni) was set up to manage State oil and gas interests. Fascist Italy had nationalized over three-quarters of its economy by 1939, more so than any nation other than the Soviet Union. Mussolini had earlier boasted in 1934 that “Three-fourths of Italian economy, industrial and agricultural, is in the hands of the state." By 1939 the Italian state had taken over four-fifths of Italy's shipping and shipbuilding, three-fourths of pig iron production, and nearly half of the steel industry.
1978
The formation of the National Health Service provided free healthcare to all citizens, still some private spending but 77% is public.

=== Japan ===
- 1906 Railway Nationalization Act of nationalized 17 railway companies to form the nationwide railway network that was later called Japanese National Railways.
- 2003 Resona Holdings was effectively nationalized after the bank's capital adequacy went too low.
- 2010 Japan Airlines was nationalized after its bankruptcy.
- 2012 Tokyo Electric Power Company was partially nationalized by the Tokyo Metropolis after the Fukushima Daiichi nuclear disaster.

=== Korea ===
- 1946 USAMGIK nationalized all railroad companies in southern Korea and formed the Department of Transportation. These are now a part of Korail.

Many lands, enterprises and industries were also nationalized by the Soviet Civil Administration and the Worker's Party-dominated provisional government in northern Korea after World War II, which later became the Democratic People's Republic of Korea in 1948.

=== Lithuania ===
In 2011 Snoras bank was nationalized.

=== Latvia ===
- 2008 Parex Bank was nationalized.

=== Malta ===
- 1974 Bank of Valletta is founded following nationalisation of the National Bank of Malta

=== Mexico ===
- 1938 The Expropriation of the Petroleum Industry: President Lázaro Cárdenas issued a decree that the petroleum companies were in rebellion against the government and under the powers granted him under the Expropriation Act passed by the Congress of Mexico in late 1936 expropriated them. March 19, 1938, union personnel took control of the properties, eventually reorganizing it as Pemex.
- 1960 President Adolfo López Mateos nationalized the electrical system on September 21, 1960, under the Comisión Federal de Electricidad (CFE). President Carlos Salinas de Gortari reprivatized the system in 1992, although the state-owned CFE remains influential.
- 1982 The nationalization of the Mexican banking system made by President José López Portillo in response to the Latin American debt crisis. Under the Carlos Salinas de Gortari presidency (1988–1994) the nationalized banks were privatized very rapidly between 1991 and 1992 to Mexican family groups.

=== Morocco ===
- 2025 SNRT, the government's state broadcaster, took full control of the semi-private 2M television channel as well as the private Medi 1 TV and Medi 1 Radio channels. The plan to nationalize the channels was announced in 2021 and was allegedly conducted under the auspices of Fouad Ali El Himma, an advisor to King Mohammed VI.

=== Nepal ===
- 1951 The government after the 1951 Nepalese revolution nationalized private and communal forests throughout the country.

=== Netherlands ===
- 2008 The state nationalizes the Dutch activities of Belgian-Dutch banking and insurance company Fortis, which had come in solvability problems due to the 2008 financial crisis.
- 2013 SNS Bank is nationalized. It had been in trouble for more than a year, not able to find a private investor. On February 1, 2013, Jeroen Dijselbloem (Dutch Minister of Finance) declares SNS nationalized.

=== New Zealand ===
- 1945 The Bank of New Zealand was nationalised. It was later sold to the National Australia Bank in 1992.
- 2001 Government purchased the Auckland railway network from Tranz Rail.
- 2003 The Labour Government took an 80% stake in near-bankrupt national air carrier Air New Zealand in exchange for a large financial infusion.
- 2004 The rest of the country's rail network is purchased from Toll New Zealand, formerly Tranz Rail. A new state owned enterprise, ONTRACK, was established to maintain the rail infrastructure.
- 2008 The rolling stock and ferries of Toll New Zealand was purchased, bringing the rail system under state ownership, renamed KiwiRail.

=== Pakistan ===
- 1972: On January 2, 1972, Prime Minister Zulfiqar Ali Bhutto, after East Pakistan broke away, announced the nationalisation of all major industries, including iron and steel, heavy engineering, heavy electricals, petrochemicals, cement and public utilities except textiles industry and lands. The process was effectively ended after the overthrow of Prime Minister Bhutto in Operation Fair Play.
- 2011: On December 15, 2011, Prime Minister Yousaf Raza Gilani nationalized all privately held shares in PIA, Railways, and Steel Mills, in order to protect capital flight of the state-owned enterprises. Pakistan Railways as well as Pakistan International Airlines. The current nationalization programme remains intact to restructured and made profitable while remaining within government ownership.

=== Philippines ===
During the term of Philippine President Ferdinand Marcos, important companies such as Philippine Long Distance Telephone Company (PLDT), Philippine Airlines, Meralco and the Manila Hotel were nationalized. Other companies were sometimes absorbed into these government-owned corporations, as well as other companies, such as National Power Corporation (Napocor) and the Philippine National Railways, which in their own right are monopolies (exceptions are Meralco and the Manila Hotel). Today, these companies have been reprivatized and some, such as PLDT and Philippine Airlines, have been de-monopolized. Others, like government-owned and controlled corporation Napocor, are in the process of privatization.

=== Poland ===
- 1946: Following World War II the Soviet-sponsored Provisional Government of National Unity nationalized all enterprises with over 50 employees under the Three-Year Plan.

=== Portugal ===
- 1974: In the years following the Carnation Revolution, the Junta de Salvação Nacional and Provisional Governments nationalized all the banking, insurance, petrol and industrial companies. Among those companies were Companhia União Fabril (CUF), the assets of the Champalimaud family and SONAE. Along with the telecommunications companies, which were state-owned even before the Revolution, many of the nationalized companies were reprivatized in the 1980s and 1990s. In the agricultural sector, according to government estimates, about 900,000 hectares (2,200,000 acres) of agricultural land were occupied between April 1974 and December 1975 in the name of land reform; about 32% of the occupations were ruled illegal. In January 1976, the government pledged to restore the illegally occupied land to its owners, and in 1977, it promulgated the Land Reform Review Law. Restoration of illegally occupied land began in 1978.
- 2008: BPN - Banco Português de Negócios bank nationalised to prevent its collapse.

=== Romania ===
- 1948 With the Decree 119 of June 11, 1948, the new Communist regime nationalised all private companies and their assets leading to the transformation of the economy from a market economy to a planned economy.
- 1950 With the Decree 92 of April 19, 1950, a huge number of private houses and lands are confiscated.

=== Russia/Soviet Union ===
- 1918 All manufacturing enterprises, many retailing enterprises, any private enterprises, the whole banking sector, agrarian sector, transportation sector, mining sector, and others nationalized by the new Russian Soviet Federative Socialist Republic under War Communism. Later the government of Vladimir Lenin introduced the New Economic Policy that shifted the country somewhat towards market economics until the end of the revolutionary period and Joseph Stalin's acquisition of power.
- 1998 The Yeltsin government began seizing Gazprom assets, claiming that the company owed back taxes. Privatization of Gazprom from the mid-1990s had been reduced to 38.37% with the intention of achieving full privatization. However, the stake of the Russian Government in Gazprom has since been increased to 50% with Vladimir Putin's plan to increase the stake to a controlling position. Gazprom is also buying up both Russian and other international utility companies.
- 2013 The space industry is renationalized. The government created a new corporation—United Rocket and Space Corporation—in August 2013 because of a string of recent rocket launch failures. According to Deputy Prime Minister Dmitry Rogozin, "The failure-prone space sector is so troubled that it needs state supervision to overcome its problems."
- Since 2023, Russia has nationalized 15 defense companies valued at approximately 333 billion rubles ($3.6 billion), according to Prosecutor General Igor Krasnov. This initiative is part of the government's effort to regain control over the defense industry amid the ongoing conflict with Ukraine. President Vladimir Putin and other officials have denied broader economic nationalization.

=== Saudi Arabia ===
- The government nationalized the oil producer company Aramco in 1980.

=== Spain ===
- 1927-1930 Petroleum industry was nationalised.
- 1941 Railways were nationalised, as Renfe, by the Francoist state in the aftermath of the Spanish Civil War.
- 1944. Nationalization of the Airline Iberia under the Instituto Nacional de Industria.
- 1945. The State buys a 79% share of telephone operator Telefónica.
- 1983 Nationalization without compensation of Rumasa .

=== Sri Lanka ===
- 1 November 1957 Katunayake air base and Trincomalee naval base taken from the British.
- 1 January 1958 Bus transport nationalised, creating the Ceylon Transport Board.
- 1 August 1958 Port of Colombo nationalised, creating the Port (Cargo) Corporation.
- 14 January 1961 Private schools nationalised.
- 27 July 1961 Bank of Ceylon nationalised.
- 1961 Insurance industry nationalised, creating the Sri Lanka Insurance Corporation.
- 1961 American and British oil companies nationalised, creating Ceylon Petroleum Corporation.
- 1971 Graphite mines nationalised, creating the State Graphite Corporation. Partially privatised in the 1990s.
- 1972 Locally owned tea, rubber and coconut plantations nationalised.
- 23 July 1973 Associated Newspapers of Ceylon Limited nationalised.
- 1975 Foreign owned plantations nationalised.
- August 1977 Times of Ceylon Limited nationalised.
- 2009 Seylan Bank nationalised to prevent its collapse.
- 2011 The Expropriation Act passed. The government will take over "underperforming or underutilized assets of 37 enterprises".

=== Sweden ===
- 1939-1948 Nationalisation of most of the private railway companies.
- 1957 The mining company LKAB is nationalized. The state had owned 50% of the corporation's shares, with options to buy the remainder, since 1907.
- 1970s The Swedish government nationalised the pharmacies, where the state-owned Apoteksbolaget AB was given a retail monopoly.
- 1992 A minor part of the banking sector is nationalized.

=== Tanzania ===
- 1967 The Arusha Declaration was proclaimed in 1967 by President Julius Nyerere, which aimed to achieve self-reliance through nationalising key sectors of the economy such as banks, large industries and plantations were therefore nationalised. This failed, worsening Tanzania's economic problems until foreign aid and liberalisation took effect in the 1980s and 1990s.

=== Turkey ===
- 1928-1940 After the abolition of Capitulations of the Ottoman Empire by the Treaty of Lausanne (1923), foreign concessions were suppressed, rail transport, electric power generation and distribution, telephone network and other big industrial firms were nationalized by Turkish government between 1928 and 1940.

=== United Kingdom ===
1858
British East India Company -In the aftermath of the Indian Rebellion, under the provisions of the Government of India Act 1858, the British Government nationalised the East India Company.
1868
Nationalisation of inland telegraphs under the General Post Office with the Telegraph Act 1868.
1875
Suez Canal Company - The Egyptian share in the company was bought by the government.
1912
Nationalisation of National Telephone Company under the GPO, apart from Portsmouth and Hull. The Portsmouth telephone service was nationalised the following year.
1916
Liquor Trade - The nationalisation of pubs and breweries in Carlisle, Gretna, Cromarty and Enfield under the State Management Scheme; mainly an attempt to restricting alcohol consumption by armaments factory workers. The scheme was privatised by asset transfer in 1973.
1926
Central Electricity Board introduced under Electricity (Supply) Act 1926 established the National Grid and set up a national standard for electricity supply.
1927
British Broadcasting Company (a privately owned company) became the British Broadcasting Corporation (BBC), a public corporation operating under a Royal Charter.
1933
London Transport
1938
Nationalisation of UK Coal Royalties under the Coal Commission by the Coal Act 1938.
1939
British Overseas Airways Corporation (BOAC), later British Airways - combining the private British Airways Ltd and the state owned Imperial Airways and placing its control under National Air Communications.
1939-45
During World War II, much of British industry was subjected to close regulation or control, although not nationalised as such.
1943
North of Scotland Hydro-Electricity Board
1945-51
The Labour Party comes to power in the Attlee ministry with a program for nationalising weak sectors of the economy.
1946
Coal industry under the National Coal Board with the Coal Industry Nationalisation Act 1946.
1946
Bank of England - its private shareholders who were bought out by the state.
1947
Central Electricity Generating Board and area electricity boards. Privatized in the 1990s.
1947
Cable & Wireless Ltd - the latter had had private shareholders who were bought out by the state.
1948
National Health Service created taking over hospitals and making medical services (see Universal Healthcare) free by the National Health Service Act 1946 which came into effect in 1948. The NHS has gone through various changes since, but has remained as an organisation in the public sector ever since.
1948
National rail, inland (not marine) water transport, some road haulage, some road passenger transport and Thomas Cook & Son under the British Transport Commission. Separate elements operated as British Railways, British Road Services, and British Waterways.
1949
Gas Act 1948 nationalises local authority and private gas supply undertakings in England, Scotland and Wales
1951
Iron and Steel Industry under the Iron and Steel Corporation of Great Britain
1951-64
The Conservative governments led by Winston Churchill, Anthony Eden, Harold Macmillan and Alec Douglas-Home allowed most of the nationalized industries and services to remain in public ownership, as part of the Post-War Consensus, though road haulage (1951) and the iron & steel industry (1955) were denationalized.
1964-70
The Labour Party returns to power in the First Wilson ministry and extends the size of the public sector.
1967
British Steel Corporation Re-nationalized (Reprivatized by the Conservative Government in September 1988)
1969
National Bus Company, combining former interests of the British Transport Commission with others acquired from the British Electric Traction group.
1969
Post Office Corporation created by the Post Office Act 1969.
1970-74
The Conservative Party returns to power in the Heath ministry and carries out a little nationalization and a little privatization.
1971
Rolls-Royce (1971) Ltd - The strategically important aero-engine part of the recently bankrupt Rolls-Royce Limited.
1973
Water Act 1973 nationalises local authority water supply undertakings in England and Wales
1973
British Gas Corporation created, replacing regional gas boards.
1974-76
The Labour Party returns to power in the Wilson ministry and resumes a nationalization programme.
1974
British Petroleum - the combination of a 50% stake bought by Winston Churchill as First Lord of the Admiralty after World War I with around a 25% stake acquired by the Bank of England from Burmah Oil made the government directly or indirectly BP's majority shareholder, though commercial independence was maintained. A minority of the shares were sold in 1977 and the remainder were sold during the 1980s.
1975
National Enterprise Board - a State holding company for full or partial ownership of industrial undertakings
1976
British Leyland Motor Corporation - became British Leyland upon nationalization under the National Enterprise Board. Later became known simply as the holding company "BL Ltd", it was later reorganised into several standalone businesses - the best known being Austin Rover, Leyland Trucks, Freight Rover, Land Rover and Jaguar.
1976-79
Under Prime Minister Jim Callaghan of the Labour Party and facing an austerity programme to reduce the Budget Deficit, nationalization starts to grind to a halt.
1977
British Aerospace - combining the major aircraft companies British Aircraft Corporation, Hawker Siddeley and others. British Shipbuilders - combining the major shipbuilding companies including Cammell Laird, Govan Shipbuilders, Swan Hunter, Yarrow Shipbuilders under the Aircraft and Shipbuilding Industries Act 1977.
1979-97
The Conservative Party comes to power under Margaret Thatcher with a pledge to roll back the frontiers of the State. The vast majority of nationalized industries, services and utilities were privatized within a decade and her successor John Major continued and extended privatization, although the NHS was allowed to continue.
1981
British Telecom (later styled as :BT:) created, taking control of telecommunications services from Post Office Telecommunications under the British Telecommunications Act 1981.
1984
Johnson Matthey Bankers - purchased for a nominal sum of £1 by the Thatcher government on fears of a banking crisis and sold to Westpac in 1986.
1990
The Caledonian Steam Packet Company spun off its ferry arm, Caledonian MacBrayne, with all shares in the new company being purchased by the Secretary of State for Scotland. Since Scottish devolution Caledonian MacBrayne has been owned by the Scottish Government.
1997-2010
The Labour Party comes to power under Tony Blair. Labour in opposition initially opposed Thatcher's privatization, but the party's commitment to nationalisation had been abandoned by the time it swept back into power, though under his successor Gordon Brown from 2007 it did nationalize many of the banks and building societies during the Great Recession.
1997
Docklands Light Railway - John Prescott announced to the 1997 Labour Party Conference that he had nationalised this, although it was already in public hands anyway.
2001
Railtrack - The owner and operator of the railway infrastructure, Railtrack, was not nationalised as such. However, its replacement Network Rail, whilst not a state-owned company, had no shareholders (company limited by guarantee) and was underwritten by the state. Prior to this the government began to make use of a residual shareholding of 0.2% (including voting rights) in Railtrack Group Plc left over from the original sale.
2003
The Strategic Rail Authority took control of the South Eastern franchise after the failure of the private operator Connex South Eastern. The franchise was re-privatised in 2006 as part of the Integrated Kent franchise.
2008
Northern Rock - Nationalization announced by Alistair Darling, Chancellor of the Exchequer on 17 February 2008 as 'a temporary measure'. The bank will be run at 'arm's length' as a commercial business and sold to a private buyer in the future. Northern Rock was sold to Virgin Money in 2011.
2008
Bradford & Bingley (mortgage book only) - announced by Alistair Darling, Chancellor of the Exchequer on 29 September 2008. The loans part of the company was nationalised, while the commercial bank was sold.
2008
In October, the Royal Bank of Scotland, and the newly merged HBOS-Lloyds TSB was partly nationalised. The Government took approximately 60% of RBS (later increased to 70%, then 80%) and 40% of HBOS-Lloyds TSB as part of the £500bn bank rescue package. The Lloyds Bank and TSB businesses were operationally demerged in 2013 in preparation for a full demerger and reprivatisation. RBS agreed a branch sale to the Santander Group in November 2011, which Santander withdrew from later. In November 2012 the Public Accounts Committee warned that it could be many years before the banks are sold and the £66 billion so far invested in these banks may never be recovered. In May 2025 the government finally completed disposal of shares in banks acquired during the Financial Crisis with the sale of remaining shares in NatWest Group (formerly called RBS Group).
2009
In June the Department for Transport took control of London & Continental Railways.
2009
On 13 November, Directly Operated Railways, a government company, took over the InterCity East Coast franchise that National Express East Coast had been awarded in 2007 with £1.4 billion premium to be paid over seven years. The nationalised service operated as East Coast and included services from London to Leeds and Edinburgh. It returned to the private sector in April 2015 with Virgin Trains East Coast
2013
Cardiff Airport was purchased by the Welsh Government from its private owners for £52 million.
2013
In December it was acknowledged that Network Rail would be reclassified as a "public sector body" in 2014 with its financial liabilities now formally included as part of the national debt. Much debate continues however, whether this still constitutes "nationalisation" in a broader context.
2013
Glasgow Prestwick Airport was purchased by the Scottish Government for £1 from its previous owner Infratil.
2018
Following the collapse of Carillion, facilities management at 52 prisons in England was transferred to a new government-owned company, Gov Facilities Services Limited.
2018
On 24 June London North Eastern Railway took over the InterCity East Coast franchise after Virgin Trains East Coast overbid.
2019
Ferguson Marine Engineering nationalised by the Scottish government.
2020
The ONS announced that private train operating companies were to be temporarily reclassified as "public non-financial corporations" from 1 April due to the government assuming the financial risk of their rail franchises during the COVID-19 pandemic. The train operating companies' debt is to be included in public borrowing figures and their employees are to be counted as public sector employees.
2021
In November 2020, the British government announced that AWE plc, operator of the Atomic Weapons Establishment, would become wholly owned by the Ministry of Defence from June 2021.
2021
Probation services in England and Wales for low- and medium-risk offenders brought back under public control after being privatised in 2014.
2021
Steel manufacturer Sheffield Forgemasters is purchased by the Ministry of Defence.
2021
Government-owned Operator of Last Resort took over train operator Southeastern from its franchise holder Govia.
2021
Bulb Energy nationalised due to increasing wholesale energy costs and the energy price cap.
2022
On 1 April, ScotRail operations were transferred by the Scottish Government from Abellio to a Scottish government owned company.
2024
A semiconductor factory owned by Coherent is purchased by the Ministry of Defence for £20 million.
2024
National Grid ESO purchased nationalised for £630 million and renamed National Energy System Operator.
2025-27
Most remaining Train operating companies are being nationalised and a publicly owned company running infrastructure and passenger services called Great British Railways is planned to be established.
2026
British Steel pursuant to the Steel Industry (Special Measures) Act 2025

==== British assets nationalised by other countries ====
1940s
Argentine railways
1953
British Petroleum's Iranian assets (actually a nationalisation of part of a part-nationalised company)
1956
The Egyptian Government nationalised the Suez Canal, owned by the Suez Canal Company which was part owned by the British government.
1962
The Ceylon Government nationalised the assets of the partly British-owned Shell.
1975
The Government of Sri Lanka nationalised the assets of the British-owned plantation companies.

=== United States ===
- 1775: Postal roads in the former Thirteen Colonies placed under control of the U.S. Post Office led by Postmaster General Benjamin Franklin by decree of the Second Continental Congress during the American Revolution. Succeeded by the U.S. Post Office Department enabled by the Postal Clause of the U.S. Constitution, and eventually the U.S. Postal Service after the Postal Reorganization Act of 1970.
- 1862 United States Military Railroad (USMRR), organized under the U.S. War Department by the Railways and Telegraph Act of 1862, took over and merged into this state-owned entity all captured Confederate trains and other railway assets.
- 1917: Merck & Co. seized by the U.S. federal government during World War I under the Trading with the Enemy Act, later became a private company, separate from the original Merck Group operating in Germany.
- 1917: All U.S. railroads were operated (but not owned) by the Railroad Administration during World War I as a wartime measure. Railroads were returned to private control in 1920 under the Esch-Cummins Act.
- 1918: The U.S. telephone system was nationalized on July 31, 1918, and placed under control of the Post Office Department. It was returned to private ownership on July 31, 1919.
- 1939: Organization of the Tennessee Valley Authority entailed the nationalization of the Tennessee Electric Power Company.
- 1943: On December 27, 1943, President Roosevelt nationalized the railroads for a few weeks to settle a strike. About 3,300 coal mines were nationalized.
- 1950: President Truman nationalized the railroads for 21 months.
- 1952: President Truman nationalized all American steel companies for a short time.
- 1971: The National Railroad Passenger Corporation (Amtrak) is a government-owned corporation created in 1971 for the express purpose of relieving American railroads of their legal obligation to provide inter-city passenger rail service. The (primarily) freight railroads had petitioned to abandon passenger service repeatedly in the decades leading up to Amtrak's formation.
- 1976: The Consolidated Rail Corporation (Conrail) was created by the Regional Rail Reorganization Act to take over the operations of six bankrupt rail lines operating primarily in the Northeast; Conrail was privatized in 1987 under the Omnibus Budget Reconciliation Act when it was acquired by CSX Transportation and the Norfolk Southern Railway, although it continues operations as an asset management and network services provider. Initial plans for Conrail would have made it a truly nationalized system like that during World War I, but an alternate proposal by the Association of American Railroads won out.
- 1984: In May, Continental Illinois bank nationalized.
- 1989: Resolution Trust Corporation seized control of hundreds of failed savings and loan associations under the Financial Institutions Reform, Recovery, and Enforcement Act in response to the 1980s savings and loan crisis.
- 2001: In response to the September 11 attacks, the airport security industry was nationalized and put under the authority of the FAA-controlled Transportation Security Administration under the Aviation and Transportation Security Act.
- 2008: Some economists consider the government's takeover of the Federal Home Loan Mortgage Corporation and Federal National Mortgage Association to have been nationalization (or renationalization). The conservatorship model used with Fannie Mae and Freddie Mac is looser and more temporary than nationalization.
- 2009: Some economists consider the government's actions through the Troubled Asset Relief Program and the Emergency Economic Stabilization Act with regards to Citigroup to have been a partial nationalization. A proposal was made that banks like Citigroup be brought under a conservatorship model similar to Fannie Mae and Freddie Mac, that some of their "good assets" be dropped into newly created "good bank" subsidiaries (presumably under new management), and the remaining "bad assets" be left to be managed under the supervision of a conservatorship structure. The government's actions with regard to General Motors in replacing the CEO with a government-approved CEO is likewise being considered as nationalization. On June 1, 2009, General Motors filed for bankruptcy during the automotive industry crisis, with the government investing up to $50 billion in debtor-in-possession financing and taking 60% ownership in the company. In addition to a U.S. Government ownership, the Governments of Canada and Ontario also took ownership of 7.9% and 3.8% of General Motors, respectively. President Barack Obama stated that the nationalization was temporary, saying, "We are acting as reluctant shareholders because that is the only way to help GM succeed"

=== Venezuela ===
- 1975 Nationalisation of the iron and steel industry.
- 1976, foundation of PDVSA with the nationalization of the Venezuelan oil industry under the presidency of Carlos Andrés Pérez.
- 2007 On May 1, 2007, the government stripped the world's biggest oil companies of operational control over massive Orinoco Belt crude projects, a controversial component in President Hugo Chávez's nationalization drive.
- 2008 On April 3, 2008, Chávez ordered the nationalization of the cement industry.
- 2008 On April 9, 2008, Chávez ordered the nationalization of Venezuelan steel mill Sidor, in which Luxembourg-based Ternium currently holds a 60% stake. Sidor employees and the Government hold a 20% stake respectively.
- 2008 On August 19, 2008, Chávez ordered the take-over of a cement plant owned and operated by Cemex, an international cement producer. While shares of Cemex fell on the New York Stock Exchange, the cement plant comprises only about 5% of the company's business, and is not expected to adversely affect the company's ability to produce in other markets. Chávez was looking to nationalize the concrete and steel industries of his country to meet home building and infrastructure goals.
- 2009 On February 28, 2009, Chávez ordered the army to take over all rice processing and packaging plants.
- 2010 On January 20, 2010, Chávez signed an ordinance to nationalize six supermarkets under the system of retail stores of a French company because of increasing price and speculation hoarding illicit.
- 2010 On June 24, 2010, Venezuela announced the intention to nationalize oil drilling rigs belonging to the U.S. company Helmerich & Payne.
- 2010 On October 25, 2010, Chávez announced that the government was nationalizing two U.S.-owned Owens-Illinois glass-manufacturing plants.
- 2010 On October 31, 2010, Chávez said his government will take over the Sidetur steel manufacturing plant. Sidetur is owned by Vivencia, which had two mineral plants appropriated by the government in 2008.
- 2015 Venezuelan President Nicolás Maduro promises to nationalize food distribution.

=== Vietnam ===
- According to the Constitution of the Socialist Republic of Vietnam in 1980, land ownership of farmers disappeared, the State owned land across the country and people have the right to temporary use of land, as a slow result of the Land reform in North Vietnam from 1953 to 1956.
- After the Fall of Saigon in 1975, the government nationalized nearly all the property of the "landlords" and "comprador" in South Vietnam, property of the church and of the government of South Vietnam. All private enterprise was nationalized without compensation down to the street vendors, however "shadow companies" continued to operate.

=== Zambia ===
- 1968 Government under Kenneth Kaunda nationalized the copper industry, represented by Anglo-American Corporation and American Metal Climax, formerly having been controlled partly by the British South Africa Company.

=== Zimbabwe ===
- Zimbabwe has nationalized its food distribution infrastructure.

=== Other countries ===
- Nationalization of the oil industry in numerous countries, including Libya, Kuwait, Mexico, Nigeria, Saudi Arabia and Iraq

== See also ==
- Nationalization
- Privatization
- List of privatizations by country
