= Timeline of the Icelandic financial crisis =

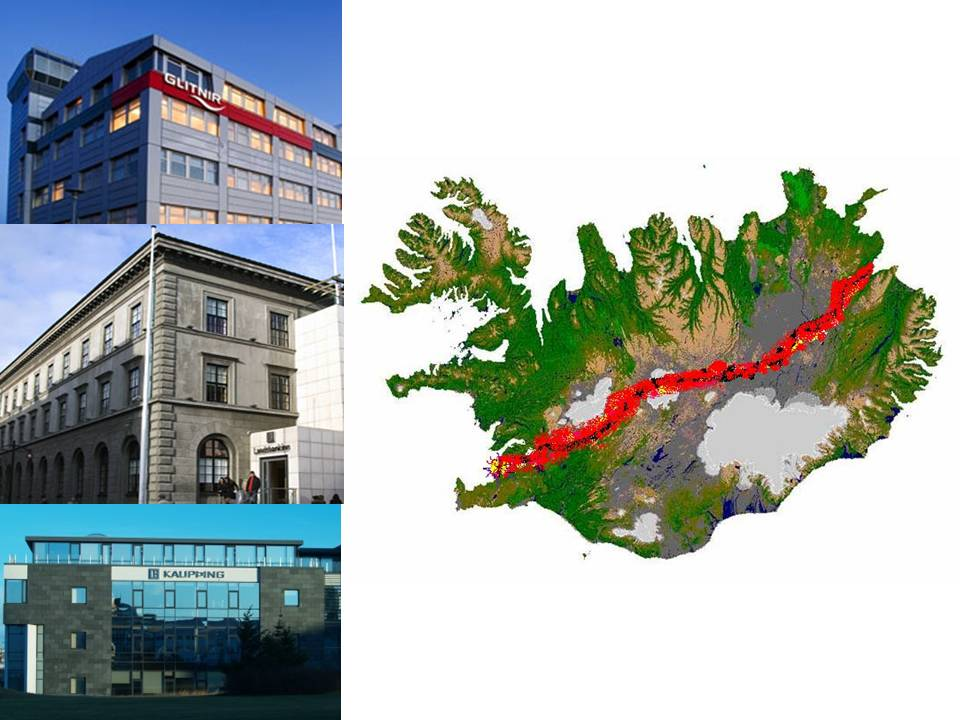
Headquarters of the three banks that collapsed in the autumn of 2008

The following is a timeline of the Icelandic financial crisis which began in earnest in mid September 2008. The combined assets of the three largest Icelandic banks amounted to ten times the country's total gross domestic product (GDP) at the time of their collapse. Two-thirds of the banks liabilities were denominated in a foreign currency. When the world's credit markets dried up, the banks were unable to refinance their loans and the government, as a lender of last resort, was unable to offer backing to the privately owned banks.

== September 2008 ==
- 15 September Lehman Brothers bank goes bankrupt in the US, instantly freezing money markets around the world.
- 25 September The chairman of the board of Glitnir bank, Thorsteinn Már Baldvinsson, meets with Central Bank of Iceland Governor, David Oddsson, to explain the severe financing difficulties the bank has encountered. The bank requests lender of last resort financing from the Central Bank.
- 26 September Prime Minister of Iceland Geir Haarde, who is traveling abroad, is informed of the situation and advised to return to Iceland.
- 27–28 September Talks continue over the weekend between the bank, the Icelandic government and the Central Bank.
- 29 September The Icelandic government announces that it will nationalise Iceland's third-largest bank, Glitnir, with the purchase of a 75% stake for €600 million. This is an agreement between the government of Iceland and the owners of Glitnir, according to the Central Bank of Iceland. The government states that it does not intend to hold ownership of the bank for a long period, and that the bank is expected to carry on operating as normal. According to the government the bank "would have ceased to exist" within a few weeks if it had not intervened. The ownership transfer never went through, however, as the Financial Supervisory Authority (FME) takes Glitnir over before the initial plan of the Icelandic government to purchase a 75% stake in the bank had been approved by the shareholders of the bank.

== October 2008 ==
- 3 October Associate Professor of Economics at the University of Iceland, Gylfi Magnússon, states in a radio interview that the "Icelandic financial system is insolvent." A veritable bank run ensues, partly eased by a statement that same day by Prime Minister Haarde that "no one needs to worry about their deposits in the Icelandic banks." Later, it emerges the Central Bank almost ran out of bank notes to meet the massive deposit withdrawals.
- 6 October The OMX Nordic Exchange Iceland announces it is suspending trading in Iceland's six biggest financial concerns. An unlimited guarantee is offered by the government for all domestic banking deposits. The Althing, the national parliament, passes emergency legislation enabling the government to intervene extensively in Iceland's financial system.
- 7 October The board of directors of Landsbanki, the island's second largest bank by value, is dismissed and the bank taken over by the FME. Earlier in the day, Russia's ambassador in Reykjavík, Victor I. Tatarintsev, informes the chairman of the executive board of the Central Bank of Iceland that the Russians were willing to loan Iceland €4 billion (680 billion ISK, US$5.4 billion). The Central Bank announced that it would be a three to four-year loan and an interest rate round 30-50 basis points above Libor. The Prime Minister of Russia, Vladimir Putin, later confirmed this. The fact that Iceland is getting a loan from Russia comes as a surprise to many within Iceland and abroad. Prime Minister Haarde later explains at a press conference: "We have been trying all year to get our friends to make swap agreements with us or get support of a different kind under these abnormal circumstances. We have not received the support we wished for from our friends, and when that happens we have to seek new friends." The Prime Minister also emphasises that this comment does not refer to the Nordic countries, which earlier had made swap agreements with the Icelandic Central Bank. Referring to the huge foreign liabilities of the stricken banks Governor Oddsson announces in a TV interview that "Icelanders will not pay the debts of profligate financiers."
- 8 October The FME takes control of Glitnir, the third-largest bank. A phone conversation between Alistair Darling, Chancellor the Exchequer and Árni Matthiesen, Icelandic finance minister, concerning British demands for the repayment of the deposits in the branches of Landsbanki bank in the UK, fails to satisfy the British government. An international dispute, known as the Icesave dispute, erupts when the British government invokes anti-terrorism legislation against Iceland in order to freeze the UK-based assets of Kaupthing, Iceland's biggest bank. The action dooms the stricken bank.
- 9 October The FME takes control of Kaupthing bank. The financial crisis deepens after all three major banks have collapsed. A diplomatic row erupts between Iceland and Britain concerning the handling of the banking collapse. At stake in Britain are hundreds of millions of pounds of British owned deposits trapped in Icelandic banks. Icelandic Prime Minister Haarde expresses shock at the decision of the UK government to invoke "hostile" anti-terrorism legislation to freeze Icelandic banks' assets in the UK.
- 10 October Gordon Brown, the Prime Minister of the UK, condemns Iceland's handling of the Icelandic banking collapse and its failure to guarantee British savers' deposits.
- 24 October The Icelandic government requests an IMF Stand-By Arrangement (SBA) to help resolve the banking and currency crisis that crippled the country's economy.

== November 2008 ==
- 21 November As part of the IMF SBA to stabilise the Icelandic economy, the Nordic countries and Poland agree to lend over €2 billion to Iceland with an additional loan of €2 billion coming from the IMF. In return, the Icelandic government agrees to a challenging plan for medium-term fiscal consolidation. The plan also calls for the resurrection of the domestic part of the fallen banks.
