= Tónlistarskólinn á Akureyri =

Location
- Strandgata 12; Menningarhúsið Hof; Akureyri; Iceland

Information
- Type: Music school
- Established: 20 January 1946
- Staff: ~40-50
- Gender: Mixed
- Website: tonak.is

Tónlistarskólinn á Akureyri (Icelandic pronunciation: [ˈtʰounˌlɪstarˌskouːlɪn au ˈaːkʏrˌeiːrɪ], regionally also [ˈaːkʰʏr-], The Music School of Akureyri) is a comprehensive music school located in Akureyri, Iceland. It was founded on 20 January 1946 and is one of Iceland's oldest and largest music schools. Its first principal was Margrét Eiríksdóttir. The school provides music teaching, both private and ensemble, on a wide variety of instruments. The staff is international, with 38 teachers from seven countries. The headmaster is Hjörleifur Örn Jónsson. There are over 400 students enrolled for the 2015–2016 academic year.

Following the 2008 Icelandic financial crash, the funding to the school was cut and it regularly had around 100 to 150 children on waiting lists.

== Notable alumni ==
- Egill Jónsson - Clarinet player
