= Iceland and the International Monetary Fund =

Iceland joined the International Monetary Fund on Dec 27th 1945, becoming one of the IMF's founding members. As a part of the IMF, Iceland has rights in accordance with its contributions, borrowing rights which help facilitate the stability of global financial markets. Iceland's quota is 321.8 million SDR, and its Special Drawing Rights are 112 million. This is a relatively small quota and its vote share comprises only 0.09% of all IMF vote shares, or 4,683 votes to be exact.

== History of IMF - Iceland relations ==
Prior to 2008, Iceland did not take any loans from IMF. As of November 2018, Iceland has had 4 arrangements with the IMF. The borrowing arrangements Iceland has initiated with the IMF total 1,190%, in excess of its normal quota ( amounting to 18% of Iceland's total GDP in the year they were initiated ). This is the greatest amount the IMF has loaned a single country as a proportion of GDP. The conditionalities of Iceland's IMF programmes are based on terms as laid out in Iceland's Letter of Intent. The conditionalities include details of Banking Sector restructuring, changes to Fiscal Policy including government austerity and changes to exchange rate policies.

=== Iceland and the 2008 financial crisis ===
During the 2008 financial crisis, Iceland's banking sector collapsed, leading to widespread unemployment. Following thereafter, three of Iceland's major banks: Kaupthing, Landsbanki and Glitnir were unable to refinance their short term debts. The banks had liabilities up to 80 percent of GDP. Investors began to pull their money out of Iceland's banks, depreciating the value of their currency, the Icelandic krona (ISK). This was triggered by an insolvency of the private banking sector.

=== Purpose of the IMF Intervention (2008) ===
Iceland needed assistance from the IMF and from its Nordic partners in the Nordic Council. Previously, there was little oversight on the banks, enabling them to take what measures possible. The goal of Iceland in this market intervention was to stem capital outflows, to restore confidence in the Icelandic economy, thus, stabilizing the krona. In 2008, IMF approved $2.1 billion, 2-year loan to Iceland. The purpose of the loan was to help revive the economy to allow the Icelandic krona to gain value. Once the IMF executive board approves, Iceland could immediately take out $833 million of the loan.

Measures adopted by Iceland included an emergency nationalization of the failing banks, a vote of the Icelandic parliament gave the FME (Icelandic Financial Supervisory Authority) broad authority over the insolvent banks. FME proceeded to audit these banks and to split their assets. Measures were also introduced to increase the minimum capital adequacy ratio of the banks to 10% as a part of the effort to re establish confidence in the economy. As a part of these reforms the authority of the FME was increased to improve the stability of the Icelandic banking sector and enforce the introduced measures.

Along with regulatory and banking changes, fiscal policy was also modified to respond to the shock in the following ways. The assumption of the banking sector debt by the Bank of Iceland was one of the initial measures acted upon. As a consequence the public debt increased from 29% in 2007 to 105% of GDP by 2009. To cope with the increased debt burden the Icelandic government adopted a medium term debt reduction plan; the structural balance be set at positive 2-3 percent by 2010. Additionally Iceland determined that it would not support the losses of its pension funds and social service programmes in order not to take up additional obligations.

=== Monetary and Fiscal policy responses to the 2008 financial crisis ===
One of the primary objectives of the Icelandic government in seeking an IMF programme was to stabilize the ISK and to set a path for its gradual appreciation. To stabilize short term pressures on the ISK the Central Bank of Iceland raised interest rates to 18% and prepared to back the krona with its foreign reserves, specifically for which Iceland asked for an IMF programme. The long term stated interest rate objective was to maintain 4.5% interest rate by 2010.

=== After the 2008 financial crisis ===
2018: GDP growth is rising at a steady pace, despite a 4% decrease from other years. While there was a small decline, economy still remains stable. Employment is abundant, enabling citizens to consume goods. The Icelandic statistical agency measures a positive trade balance of Icelandic Krona 123,702 million for the first three business quarters of 2018 when accounting for both goods and services exports. The largest export item measured was travel, which accounted for nearly 50% of all exported services as well as for the relatively heavy demand for petrochemical and aviation products Imports are measured a $6.62 billion and exports at $4.74 billion resulting in a negative balance of trade for 2018 so far. The trade deficit arose from strong consumption and business investment, especially evident in the procurement of aircraft, petrochemical aviation products and agricultural and consumer goods.
