= Bakkavör =

Food manufacturing company

Bakkavör Group plc
- Type: Subsidiary
- Industry: Food manufacturing
- Founded: 1986; 40 years ago
- Founders: Ágúst Guðmundsson; Lýður Guðmundsson
- Defunct: 16 January 2026; 9 months ago
- Headquarters: London, England, UK
- Number of locations: 43
- Area served: United Kingdom; Spain; France; United States; China (including Hong Kong)
- Key people: Simon Burke (Chairman); Mike Edwards (CEO)
- Products: Ready meals; soups; sauces; prepared fruits and vegetables; salads; desserts; dips; pizzas
- Revenue: ▲£2,292.7 million (2024)
- Operating income: ▲£113.6 million (2024)
- Net income: ▲£55.7 million (2024)
- Owner: Greencore
- Number of employees: c. 17,450 (2025)
- Divisions: Meals; Desserts; Pizza & Bread; Salads
- Website: www.bakkavor.com

Bakkavör Group plc (originally Bakkavör) was an international food manufacturing company specialising in fresh prepared foods. With its headquarters in London, England, it operated 43 manufacturing sites in the UK, US, and previously China.

Previously listed on the London Stock Exchange (LSE), it was acquired by Greencore in January 2026.

== History ==
Bakkavör was founded in 1986 by brothers Ágúst and Lýður Guðmundsson to manufacture and export cod roe to Scandinavia. In 1993, it became the first production company in Iceland to obtain a ISO:9002 certification for quality assurance.

In 1997, three years before it was revealed to have an annual turnover of over 4.5 billion ISK, the firm expanded into Scandinavian and European markets selling cod and lumpfish roe. In addition, it started selling convenience foods, acquiring Katsouris Fresh Foods, Wine & Dine, and Geest.

In early 2003, the company sold its Icelandic components to Fram Foods ehf. and began focusing on the UK market. Having employed over 13,000 people in 2005, Bakkavör was heavily indebted following the 2008 financial crisis, forcing its founders into emergency talks with its bondholders.

After the Guðmundsson brothers reacquired a major stake in Bakkavör from their investment firm Exista in 2009, it was delisted from NASDAQ OMX in Iceland the following year and became a private limited company. Lýður and Ágúst faced fraud charges in Iceland in 2012 relating to their ownership of Exista.

Between 2013 and 2015, it simplified its structure, selling its South African operation and a 40% stake in its Italian business later in the year, along with other operations in Continental Europe. The firm acquired US prepared foods manufacturer B. Robert's Foods in January 2015.

In January 2016, Bakkavör was acquired by a company controlled by its founders and by funds managed by The Baupost Group, called Bakk AL Holdings Limited, which took possession of approximately 89% of its outstanding shares.

In April 2017, seven months before its IPO on the LSE, it was reported that some supermarkets had to recall the company's hummus due to poor quality control. In 2022, three years after Bakkavör acquired the Leicester-based dessert manufacturer Blueberry Foods, Mike Edwards was appointed to succeed Ágúst Guðmundsson as CEO following his departure.

In April 2025, Greencore announced it would acquire Bakkavör for £1.2 billion, subject to shareholder and regulatory approval. The China business was sold in July 2025 to streamline operations and prepare the business for the Greencore acquisition. As Greencore agreed to divest its sauces and soups site to address competition concerns, it was announced in December 2025 that it had received approval from the UK Competition and Markets Authority to finalize the transaction. The Greencore acquisition of Bakkavör was completed on 16 January 2026, with all sites being rebranded to the Greencore branding.

=== Strike in Spalding, Lincolnshire ===
On 27 September 2024, more than 400 staff at the Bakkavör factory in Spalding, Lincolnshire, went on a strike in a dispute over pay; Bakkavör said it had offered 7.8% pay rises to its lowest-paid workers and 6.4% to other staff. It said about 35% of the workforce was on strike, with the remaining 800 continuing to work at the site as normal.

In November, the Financial Times reported that the strike action was causing shortages of taramasalata in UK supermarkets, and The Grocer reported that some chilled soups were out of stock.

== Operations ==
The company produced a range of meals, salads, desserts, dips, sauces, sandwiches and pizza and bread products. Bakkavör produced over 3,500 product categories to suppliers in the UK, United States and China.
