= Klakki =

Icelandic financial services group

- Type: Private
- Industry: Financial services
- Founded: 2001
- Headquarters: Reykjavík, Iceland
- Products: Insurance, asset financing, investments
- Revenue: €961.5 million (2007)
- Net income: ▲€573.9 million (2007)
- Total assets: €8.011 billion (2007)
- Number of employees: 430 (2007)
- Website: klakki.is

Klakki (known as Exista until 2011) is an Icelandic financial services group formerly listed on the Iceland Stock Exchange. Its activities are based primarily on insurance underwriting and other financial services, although it is also active in investments. The group's primary market is the Nordic countries.

== History ==
According to a report, Luxembourg-registered Compagnie Financiere Scandinave was renamed the Scandinavian Holding a month after incorporation. Later it was renamed Meidur S.A.. Meidur changed its name to Exista.

Exista was founded in 2001 by a consortium of Icelandic savings banks as a vehicle to hold shares in Kaupthing Bank. A controlling shareholding in Exista was sold to a holding company of Bakkavör founders Ágúst and Lýdur Gudmundsson in 2002. In September 2006 the firm was floated on the Iceland Stock Exchange in a €2.6 billion initial public offering, the biggest in the country's history. The Gudmundsson brothers continue however to hold a near-45% stake in the business. The company was delisted from the exchange in December 2008 following a share buyback.

By 9 October 2008, Kaupthing Bank HF was forced into government receivership. On 29 July 2009 WikiLeaks exposed a confidential 210-page document listing Kaupthing's exposure to loans ranging from €45 million–1.25 billion. The leaked presentation revealed the bank had loaned billions of euros to its major shareholders, including a total of €1.43 billion to Exista and subsidiaries which own 23% of the bank.

== Operations ==
=== Insurance and financial services ===
Exista owns the Icelandic non-life insurance company Vátryggingarfélag Íslands (VÍS), which holds around one-third of the domestic market. Exista acquired control of VÍS from Kaupthing Bank in 2006. The firm also owns VÍS's sister company, the life cover provider Lífís. Exista's third consolidated subsidiary is Lýsing, which is a provider of asset financing.

=== Investments ===
Prior to the 2008–2011 Icelandic financial crisis, Exista held a number of significant stakes in publicly traded companies. It opted to divest many of these, including 20% of Sampo Group, 8.7% of Storebrand and 39.6% of Bakkavör, in October 2008 in order to boost its capital position. It was also the largest single shareholder (with almost 25%) of Kaupthing Bank before its de facto nationalisation by the Icelandic government.

Currently Exista holds a 29% share of JJB Sports in conjunction with its chief executive Chris Ronnie, and is the sole owner of Skipti, the parent company of Icelandic telecommunications provider Síminn.
