= Housing Financing Fund =

The Housing Financing Fund or HFF (Icelandic: Íbúðalánasjóður or ÍLS) is Iceland's government-owned mortgage lender. It grants house purchase and home improvement loans to individual borrowers, loans to build up rental housing stock to local government, companies and residents' organizations. As well as special loans such as for house renovations for the disabled or elderly.

The purpose of the fund is to ensure housing security and equality for all Icelanders on controllable terms.

== History ==
The HFF was created in 1999, following the Housing Act, no. 44/1998, to act a successor to the old Icelandic Housing Authority (IHA, founded 1957) after the merger of the State Building Fund and the Workers' Building Fund.

The HFF was substantially impacted by the 2008–2011 Icelandic financial crisis. In order to ensure that the HFF would remain solvent, the Icelandic government injected ISK 33 billion (2.1% of 2010 GDP) at the end of 2010, under a restructuring plan approved by the European Free Trade Association Surveillance Authority (EFTA).
