= Bjarni Ármannsson =

Icelandic banker

Bjarni Ármannsson (born 23 March 1968) is an Icelandic banker who resigned as CEO of Glitnir (formerly Íslandsbanki), a financial group based in Iceland, in May 2007.

In 2019 Bjarni Ármannsson was appointed CEO of Iceland Seafood International, replacing Helgi Anton Eiríksson.

In May 2019, Bjarni Ármannsson became the eighth Icelander to reach the park of Mount Everest.
