= Íslandsbanki =

Icelandic bank

Íslandsbanki hf.
- Company type: Private
- Industry: Banking
- Predecessor: Glitnir banki hf.
- Founded: 15 October 2008 (history traces back to 1884)
- Headquarters: Reykjavík, Iceland
- Number of locations: 12 branches (2023); 33 ATMs (2023)
- Area served: Iceland
- Key people: Jón Guðni Ómarsson (CEO); Fridrik Sophusson (Chairman)
- Products: Consumer banking, corporate banking, mortgage loans, private banking, private equity, wealth management, credit cards,
- Revenue: ▼ISK 44.189 billion (2017)
- Operating income: ▲ISK 14.802 billion (2017)
- Net income: ▼ISK 13.226 billion (2017)
- Total assets: ▼ISK 1.036 trillion (2017)
- Total equity: ▲ISK 181.045 billion (2017)
- Owner: 42.5% Icelandic State Treasury
- Number of employees: 861 (End of 2017)
- Website: www.islandsbanki.is

Íslandsbanki (Icelandic pronunciation: [ˈistlan(t)sˌpauŋcɪ], lit. 'Iceland Bank') is an Icelandic bank with roots tracing back to 1875, formerly being the domestic part of Glitnir banki hf., but on 15 October 2008 being split from the bankrupt Glitnir and reestablished into a new independent bank. The sole operations of the bank is to manage a branch network in Iceland, with a 20%-40% market share across all domestic franchise areas. As of 2022, the bank has 12 branches around Iceland.

== First Íslandsbanki ==
Íslandsbanki was originally created in 1990 through the merger of Alþýðubanki (Union Bank), Verzlunarbanki (Bank of Commerce) and Iðnaðarbanki (Industrial Bank). After its 2000 merger with FBA Icelandic Investment Bank, the bank was briefly renamed Íslandsbanki-FBA, but "FBA" was dropped from the name in 2002. In 2006, the bank again rebranded itself as Glitnir.

== Second Íslandsbanki ==
The bank was re-established on 15 October 2008 under the name Nýi Glitnir ("New Glitnir") to take over the Icelandic operations of Glitnir banki hf., after the 2008-2011 Icelandic financial crisis. The name was changed back to Íslandsbanki on 20 February 2009. The name Glitnir was deemed to be unreliable after the financial collapse, and a new logo was designed based on the old Glitnir and Íslandsbanki logos. Íslandsbanki was wholly owned by the Icelandic State Treasury from 2008 until 2021.

By the end of 2017, the bank had 861 full-time employees and a total amount of assets worth ISK 1.036 trillion, and its operations were divided into six business segments: Retail Banking, Corporate Banking, Markets, Wealth Management, Treasury and Subsidiaries & Equity Investments. The Bank has a 20–40% market share across all domestic franchise areas, and operates an efficient branch network in Iceland.

The directors, executives, and auditors of four Icelandic banks: Kaupthing Bank, Landsbanki, Glitnir/Íslandsbanki, and the Central Bank of Iceland, were awarded the satirical Ig Nobel Prize in Economics in 2009 for demonstrating that tiny banks can be rapidly transformed into huge banks, and vice versa and for demonstrating that similar things can be done to an entire national economy.

The current CEO is Jón Guðni Ómarsson.

=== Privatisation ===
In 2021, the Icelandic Government, in line with its plan, decided to begin the sell-off of Íslandsbanki in stages. In 2021, the government sold a 35% share in Íslandsbanki, with a further 22.5% being sold in March 2022. This brings the Icelandic State Treasury's share in the bank at 42.5% as of 2022.
