= Sparisjóðabanki =

Commercial bank in Reykjavík, Iceland

SPB (former Sparisjóðabanki Íslands [ˈspaːrɪˌsjouːðaˌpauŋcɪ ˈistlan(t)s], transl. Iceland Savings Bank) was a commercial bank in Reykjavík, Iceland, focusing on wholesale and investment banking services to savings banks, Icelandic and foreign financial institutions and other customers. It operated in the areas of trade finance and foreign exchange, payment services, treasury services and funding.

SPB shared offices with the Icelandic Savings Banks' Association and The Savings Banks' Guarantee Fund. There were about 90 employees in the Bank. It held a substantial stake in Teris, having been one of the original seven founders in 1989.

At the end of 2006 Icebank served as banking institution for most of Iceland's 23 savings banks. In 2009, the bank was liquidated by the District Court of Reykjavik.

== See also ==
- 2008–2011 Icelandic financial crisis
