= Guernsey Financial Services Commission =

Regulatory body in Guernsey

Agency overview
- Formed: 1987
- Jurisdiction: Guernsey
- Headquarters: St. Peter Port
- Agency executives: John Aspden, (Chairman of the Commission); William Mason, (Director General)
- Website: gfsc.gg

The Guernsey Financial Services Commission is the regulatory body for the finance sector in the Bailiwick of Guernsey. It supervises and regulates over 2,000 licensees from within the banking, fiduciary, investment and insurance sectors in accordance with standards set by international bodies such as the Basel Committee for Banking Supervisors, the International Association of Insurance Supervisors, the International Organisation of Securities Commissions and the Financial Action Task Force on Money Laundering.

The Commission uses a risk based approach to the supervision of licensees which is underpinned by a system known as PRISM.

== See also ==
- List of banks in Guernsey
- List of financial supervisory authorities by country
