= Financial Supervisory Authority (Iceland) =

Government agency of Iceland

- Fjármálaeftirlitið

Agency overview
- Formed: 1999
- Jurisdiction: Iceland
- Headquarters: Reykjavík, Iceland
- Employees: 75 (2009)
- Agency executive: Gunnar T. Andersen, Director-general
- Website: fme.is

The Financial Supervisory Authority (Icelandic: Fjármálaeftirlitið (FME)) was the single supervisory authority for the financial sector in Iceland from 1999 to end-2019. Companies regulated by the authority included commercial banks, savings banks, insurance companies, insurance brokers, credit institutions (investment banks and credit card companies), securities firms, securities brokers, mutual funds and pension funds management companies and other entities authorized to receive deposits. Its first CEO was Pall Gunnar Palsson, who directed from 1999 to 2005.

On 1 January 2020, the FME was merged into the Central Bank of Iceland.

== History ==
The FME was established in 1999, under the authority of two acts of legislation, act number 87/1998 on the Official Supervision of Financial Operations and act number 99/1999 on the Payment of Cost Due to the Official Supervision of Financial Activities.

=== FME and the Icelandic financial crisis 2008 ===
During the 2008–2012 Icelandic financial crisis Jónas Fr Jónsson was the CEO of the FME, both he and the FME were heavily criticized for missing the warning signs and inaction leading up to and during the crisis. The FME played an important role during the crises in late 2008 when the main three Icelandic banks failed:

On October 6, 2008 it was announced that the FME would be given significant additional powers over Icelandic financial institutions by the Icelandic government. Included the power to take over the running of Icelandic banks without actually nationalising them. Immediately the following morning it intervened in the operations of Landsbanki and Glitnir, taking over their operations within Iceland.

On 9 October, Kaupthing was placed into receivership by the FME, following the resignation of the entire board of directors. The bank said that it was in technical default on its loan agreements after its UK subsidiary had been placed into administration.

On 25 January 2009, Björgvin G. Sigurðsson, Iceland's Commerce Minister, resigned citing the pressures of the nation's economic collapse, as the country's political leaders failed to agree on how to lead country out of its financial crisis. One of his last acts as minister was to dismiss Jónas Fr Jónsson the director of the Financial Supervisory Authority (FSA). He was subsequently replaced by Deputy CEO Ragnar Haflidason.

== See also ==
- List of financial supervisory authorities by country
