= Glitnir (bank) =

Former Icelandic bank

Glitnir Banki hf.
- Type: Private
- Industry: Banking
- Founded: Reykjavík, Iceland (traces history to 1904)
- Fate: Government custodianship, moratorium on payments
- Successor: Nýi Glitnir (Icelandic business only)
- Headquarters: Reykjavík, Iceland
- Key people: Þorsteinn Már Baldvinsson (Chairman of the board), Lárus Welding (CEO)
- Net income: ▲ISK 27,651 million (2007)
- Total assets: ISK 2,948 billion (2007)
- Number of employees: 1,980 (2007)
- Website: www.glitnir.is (in Icelandic) www.glitnirbank.com

Glitnir was an international Icelandic bank. It was created by the state-directed merger of the country's three privately held banks - Alþýðubanki (Union Bank), Verzlunarbanki (Bank of Commerce) and Iðnaðarbanki (Industrial Bank) - and one failing publicly held bank - Útvegsbanki (Fisheries Bank) - to form Íslandsbanki in 1990. At the time, Íslandsbanki was the only major privately held commercial bank in Iceland. It was publicly listed on the Iceland Stock Exchange, in 1993. Íslandsbanki subsequently merged with FBA Icelandic Investment Bank in 2000.

On 20 February 2009, in light of the Icelandic financial crisis, the bank's name was changed back to the original Íslandsbanki.

By 15 October 2009, it was decided that 95% of the new Íslandsbanki would be taken over by the creditors of Old Glitnir, while the government of Iceland would retain ownership of the remaining 5%.

== Ownership ==
A third of the company was owned by Stodir. A large share of Stodir was controlled by Baugur Group which (reportedly by a number of companies) has an address in a single mailbox in the British Virgin Islands.

== Overview of operations ==
The financial group Glitnir offered universal banking and was a leading niche player in three global segments; seafood/food, sustainable energy, and offshore supply vessels. Glitnir operated branches in London and Copenhagen, and had representative offices in Halifax, Canada and in Shanghai, China. Services included retail, corporate and investment banking, stock trade and capital management. Glitnir also had a fully owned bank in Luxembourg (Glitnir Bank Luxembourg S.A) and banks and financial services companies in Norway.

Glitnir considered Iceland and Norway its home markets. Since 2004, Glitnir had acquired BNbank and Glitnir bank (previously Kredittbanken), Glitnir Securities (previously Norse Securities) and Glitnir Kapitalforvaltning, the factoring company Glitnir Factoring (previously FactoNor), and 50.1 percent of Union Gruppen in Norway. In addition, Glitnir's subsidiary BNbank acquired 45 per cent of the shares in Norsk Privatøkonomi ASA, an independent financial advisory company with 12 branches in key areas of Norway, in July 2006.

Glitnir continued to expand its operations in the Nordic countries. In Sweden, Glitnir owns the leading Swedish brokerage firm Glitnir AB (formerly Fischer Partners). The acquisition of 68.1 per cent of the shares in the Finnish investment firm FIM was announced in early February 2007 and completed later in the spring of 2007. Glitnir announced strong profits for 2006, with a return on equity after tax of 39.4 per cent.

== Government takes control ==
On October 7, 2008, the Government of Iceland nationalised Glitnir by acquiring a 75% share in the bank for €600 million through the Icelandic Financial Supervisory Authority. The government stated that it did not intend to keep the ownership of the bank for a long-term period.

The Norwegian subsidiary of Glitnir Bank, Glitnir Bank ASA, was sold for NOK 300 million on October 21, 2008, or ISK 5.5 billion, but its current worth is estimated at ISK 36.5 billion. Glitnir Bank ASA was bought by 20 savings banks. The takeover was led by Finn Haugan, the managing director of Sparebanken Midt-Norge which acquired a 25-percent stake in the bank. SpareBank 1 SMN is headquartered in Trondheim and is Central Norway's largest financial group.

== Glitnir management ==
Lárus Welding was the chief executive officer of Glitnir when the bank was taken into government administration late September 2008. The chief executive officer, appointed by the bank's board of directors, is responsible for the day-to-day operation of the bank pursuant to the policy and resolutions of the board of directors. It is also the task of the CEO to ensure that the bank's operations are at all times consistent with the articles of association of the company and applicable legislation.

Thorsteinn M. Jonsson was elected chairman of the board in April 2007.

Þorsteinn Már Baldvinsson was elected chairman of the board in February 2008.

== See also ==
- Íslandsbanki
- Kaupthing Bank
- Landsbanki
- Seðlabanki Íslands
