= Reykjavík (Althing constituency) =

Former constituency of the Althing, the national legislature of Iceland

- Former Constituency for the Althing
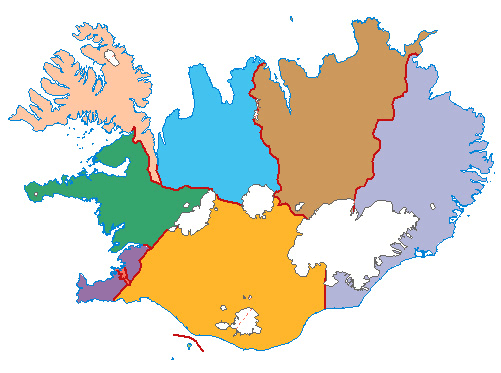
- Althing constituencies between 1959 and 2003
- Municipality: Reykjavík
- Region: Capital

Former Constituency
- Created: 1844
- Abolished: 2003
- Seats: List (Note: Excludes compensatory seats.): 15 (1995–2003); 14 (1987–1995); 12 (1959–1987); 8 (1942–1959); 6 (1934–1942); 4 (1923–1934); 2 (1904–1923); 1 (1844–1904)
- Replaced by: List: Reykjavík North; Reykjavík South

Reykjavík was one of the multi-member constituencies of the Althing, the national legislature of Iceland. The constituency was established in 1844 when the Althing was converted into a consultative assembly. It was abolished in 2003 when the constituency was split into two constituencies following the re-organisation of constituencies across Iceland. Reykjavík was conterminous with the municipality of Reykjavík.

== Election results ==
=== Summary ===
Election	People's Alliance G / C / K			Left-Green U			Social Democrats S / A			Progressive B / F			Independence D / S / Í / B / H		
Election	Votes	%	Seats	Votes	%	Seats	Votes	%	Seats	Votes	%	Seats	Votes	%	Seats
1999				6,198	9.39%	1	19,153	29.02%	5	6,832	10.35%	1	30,168	45.71%	8
1995	9,440	14.39%	2				7,498	11.43%	2	9,743	14.85%	2	27,736	42.28%	7
1991	8,259	13.30%	2				9,165	14.76%	2	6,299	10.14%	1	28,731	46.26%	8
1987	8,226	13.78%	2				9,527	15.96%	2	5,738	9.61%	1	17,333	29.04%	5
1983	9,634	18.98%	2				5,470	10.78%	1	4,781	9.42%	1	21,807	42.97%	6
1979	10,888	22.27%	3				8,691	17.77%	2	7,252	14.83%	2	21,428	43.82%	5
1978	12,016	24.35%	3				11,159	22.61%	3	4,116	8.34%	1	19,515	39.55%	5
1974	9,874	20.58%	2				4,071	8.49%	1	8,014	16.71%	2	24,023	50.08%	7
1971	8,851	19.96%	2				4,468	10.08%	1	6,766	15.26%	2	18,884	42.59%	6
1967	5,423	13.28%	1				7,138	17.48%	2	6,829	16.72%	2	17,510	42.87%	6
1963	6,678	17.71%	2				5,730	15.20%	2	6,178	16.38%	2	19,122	50.71%	6
1959 Oct	6,543	18.53%	2				5,946	16.84%	2	4,100	11.61%	1	16,474	46.66%	7
1959 Jun	6,598	18.75%	1				4,701	13.36%	1	4,446	12.64%	1	17,943	50.99%	5
1956	8,240	24.52%	2				6,306	18.77%	1	151	0.45%	0	16,928	50.38%	5
1953	6,704	21.48%	2				4,936	15.82%	1	2,624	8.41%	0	12,245	39.24%	4
1949	8,133	28.50%	2				4,420	15.49%	1	2,996	10.50%	1	12,990	45.52%	4
1946	6,990	28.44%	3				4,570	18.60%	1	1,436	5.84%	0	11,580	47.12%	4
1942 Oct	5,980	30.20%	3				3,303	16.68%	1	945	4.77%	0	8,292	41.87%	4
1942 Jul	5,335	27.96%	2				3,319	17.39%	1	905	4.74%	0	8,801	46.12%	3
1937	2,742	15.13%	1				4,135	22.82%	1	1,047	5.78%	0	10,138	55.95%	4
1934	1,014	6.86%	0				5,039	34.09%	2	805	5.45%	0	7,525	50.91%	4
1933	737	7.62%	0				3,244	33.53%	1				5,693	58.85%	3
1931	251	2.59%	0				2,628	27.12%	1	1,234	12.74%	0	5,576	57.55%	3
1927							2,493	34.62%	2				3,550	49.30%	2
1923							2,492	33.51%	1				4,944	66.49%	3
1919							853	23.78%	0				2,013	56.12%	1
1916 Oct							749	40.20%	1				710	38.13%	1

(Excludes compensatory seats.)

=== Detailed ===
==== 1990s ====
===== 1999 =====
Results of the 1999 parliamentary election held on 8 May 1999:

Party		Votes	%	Seats		
Party		Votes	%	Con.	Com.	Tot.
Independence Party	D	30,168	45.71%	8	1	9
Social Democratic Alliance	S	19,153	29.02%	5	0	5
Progressive Party	B	6,832	10.35%	1	1	2
Left-Green Movement	U	6,198	9.39%	1	1	2
Liberal Party	F	2,756	4.18%	0	1	1
Humanist Party	H	414	0.63%	0	0	0
Christian Democratic Party	K	268	0.41%	0	0	0
Anarchists in Iceland	Z	204	0.31%	0	0	0
Valid votes		65,993	100.00%	15	4	19
Blank votes		1,475	2.18%			
Rejected votes – other		127	0.19%			
Total polled		67,595	82.06%			
Registered electors		82,374				

The following candidates were elected:

- Constituency seats - Ásta Ragnheiður Jóhannesdóttir (S), 19,092 votes; Björn Bjarnason (D), 29,997 votes; Bryndís Hlöðversdóttir (S), 19,095 votes; Davíð Oddsson (D), 30,023 votes; Finnur Ingólfsson (B), 6,542 votes; Geir Haarde (D), 30,124 votes; Guðmundur Hallvarðsson (D), 30,093 votes; Guðrún Ögmundsdóttir (S), 19,057 votes; Jóhanna Sigurðardóttir (S), 18,974 votes; Katrín Fjeldsted (D), 30,067 votes; Lára Margrét Ragnarsdóttir (D), 30,105 votes; Ögmundur Jónasson (U), 6,111 votes; Össur Skarphéðinsson (S), 19,042 votes; Pétur Blöndal (D), 30,110 votes; and Sólveig Pétursdóttir (D), 30,006 votes.
- Compensatory seats - Ásta Möller (D), 30,086 votes; Kolbrún Halldórsdóttir (U), 6,125 votes; Ólafur Örn Haraldsson (B), 6,783 votes; and Sverrir Hermannsson (F), 2,722 votes.

===== 1995 =====
Results of the 1995 parliamentary election held on 8 April 1995:

Party		Votes	%	Seats		
Party		Votes	%	Con.	Com.	Tot.
Independence Party	D	27,736	42.28%	7	1	8
Progressive Party	B	9,743	14.85%	2	0	2
People's Alliance	G	9,440	14.39%	2	1	3
Social Democratic Party	A	7,498	11.43%	2	0	2
National Awakening	J	5,777	8.81%	1	1	2
Women's List	V	4,594	7.00%	1	1	2
Natural Law Party	N	603	0.92%	0	0	0
Christian Political Movement	K	202	0.31%	0	0	0
Valid votes		65,593	100.00%	15	4	19
Blank votes		980	1.47%			
Rejected votes – other		126	0.19%			
Total polled		66,699	86.02%			
Registered electors		77,539				

The following candidates were elected:

- Constituency seats - Björn Bjarnason (D), 27,630 votes; Bryndís Hlöðversdóttir (G), 9,386 votes; Davíð Oddsson (D), 27,663 votes; Finnur Ingólfsson (B), 9,411 votes; Friðrik Klemenz Sophusson (D), 27,570 votes; Geir Haarde (D), 27,650 votes; Guðmundur Hallvarðsson (D), 27,636 votes; Jóhanna Sigurðardóttir (J), 5,769 votes; Jón Baldvin Hannibalsson (A), 7,443 votes; Kristín Ástgeirsdóttir (V), 4,550 votes; Lára Margrét Ragnarsdóttir (D), 27,639 votes; Ólafur Örn Haraldsson (B), 9,681 votes; Össur Skarphéðinsson (A), 7,351 votes; Sólveig Pétursdóttir (D), 27,616 votes; and Svavar Gestsson (G), 9,365 votes.
- Compensatory seats - Ásta Ragnheiður Jóhannesdóttir (J), 5,740 votes; Guðný Guðbjörnsdóttir (V), 4,558 votes; Ögmundur Jónasson (G), 9,353 votes; and Pétur Blöndal (D), 27,607 votes.

===== 1991 =====
Results of the 1991 parliamentary election held on 20 April 1991:

Party		Votes	%	Seats		
Party		Votes	%	Con.	Com.	Tot.
Independence Party	D	28,731	46.26%	8	1	9
Social Democratic Party	A	9,165	14.76%	2	1	3
People's Alliance	G	8,259	13.30%	2	0	2
Women's List	V	7,444	11.99%	1	2	3
Progressive Party	B	6,299	10.14%	1	0	1
National Party and Humanist Party	Þ	845	1.36%	0	0	0
Liberals	F	791	1.27%	0	0	0
Green Movement	Z	390	0.63%	0	0	0
Home Rule Association	H	180	0.29%	0	0	0
Valid votes		62,104	100.00%	14	4	18
Blank votes		874	1.39%			
Rejected votes – other		125	0.20%			
Total polled		63,103	86.09%			
Registered electors		73,299				

The following candidates were elected:

- Constituency seats - Björn Bjarnason (D), 28,628 votes; Davíð Oddsson (D), 28,488 votes; Eyjólfur Konráð Jónsson (D), 28,586 votes; Finnur Ingólfsson (B), 5,979 votes; Friðrik Klemenz Sophusson (D), 28,641 votes; Geir Haarde (D), 28,617 votes; Guðrún Helgadóttir (G), 8,095 votes; Ingi Björn Albertsson (D), 28,528 votes; Ingibjörg Sólrún Gísladóttir (V), 7,433 votes; Jóhanna Sigurðardóttir (A), 9,140 votes; Jón Baldvin Hannibalsson (A), 9,023 votes; Lára Margrét Ragnarsdóttir (D), 28,663 votes; Sólveig Pétursdóttir (D), 28,645 votes; and Svavar Gestsson (G), 8,201 votes.
- Compensatory seats - Guðmundur Hallvarðsson (D), 28,658 votes; Kristín Ástgeirsdóttir (V), 7,430 votes; Kristín Einarsdóttir (V), 7,429 votes; and Össur Skarphéðinsson (A), 9,012 votes.

==== 1980s ====
===== 1987 =====
Results of the 1987 parliamentary election held on 25 April 1987:

Party		Votes	%	Seats		
Party		Votes	%	Con.	Com.	Tot.
Independence Party	D	17,333	29.04%	5	1	6
Social Democratic Party	A	9,527	15.96%	2	1	3
Citizens' Party	S	8,965	15.02%	2	1	3
Women's List	V	8,353	14.00%	2	1	3
People's Alliance	G	8,226	13.78%	2	0	2
Progressive Party	B	5,738	9.61%	1	0	1
Humanist Party	M	1,378	2.31%	0	0	0
Alliance of Social Democrats	C	162	0.27%	0	0	0
Valid votes		59,682	100.00%	14	4	18
Blank votes		481	0.80%			
Rejected votes – other		104	0.17%			
Total polled		60,267	89.43%			
Registered electors		67,387				

The following candidates were elected:

- Constituency seats - Albert Guðmundsson (S), 8,954 votes; Birgir Ísleifur Gunnarsson (D), 17,251 votes; Eyjólfur Konráð Jónsson (D), 17,256 votes; Friðrik Klemenz Sophusson (D), 17,104 votes; Guðmundur Ágústsson (S), 8,932 votes; Guðmundur G. Þórarinsson (B), 5,497 votes; Guðmundur H. Garðarsson (D), 17,245 votes; Guðrún Agnarsdóttir (V), 8,342 votes; Guðrún Helgadóttir (G), 8,164 votes; Jóhanna Sigurðardóttir (A), 9,468 votes; Jón Sigurðsson (A), 9,420 votes; Kristín Einarsdóttir (V), 8,335 votes; Ragnhildur Helgadóttir (D), 17,149 votes; and Svavar Gestsson (G), 8,154 votes.
- Compensatory seats - Aðalheiður Bjarnfreðinsdóttir (S), 8,950 votes; Geir Haarde (D), 17,250 votes; Jón Baldvin Hannibalsson (A), 9,450 votes; and Þórhildur Þorleifsdóttir (V), 8,324 votes.

===== 1983 =====
Results of the 1983 parliamentary election held on 23 April 1983:

Party		Votes	%	Seats		
Party		Votes	%	Con.	Com.	Tot.
Independence Party	D	21,807	42.97%	6	0	6
People's Alliance	G	9,634	18.98%	2	1	3
Social Democratic Party	A	5,470	10.78%	1	1	2
Alliance of Social Democrats	C	4,815	9.49%	1	1	2
Progressive Party	B	4,781	9.42%	1	0	1
Women's List	V	4,248	8.37%	1	1	2
Valid votes		50,755	100.00%	12	4	16
Blank votes		1,036	2.00%			
Rejected votes – other		125	0.24%			
Total polled		51,916	87.87%			
Registered electors		59,082				

The following candidates were elected:

- Constituency seats - Albert Guðmundsson (D), 21,692 votes; Birgir Ísleifur Gunnarsson (D), 19,974 votes; Ellert Schram (D), 19,055 votes; Friðrik Klemenz Sophusson (D), 20,870 votes; Guðmundur J. Guðmundsson (G), 9,183 votes; Jón Baldvin Hannibalsson (A), 5,451 votes; Ólafur Jóhannesson (B), 4,778 votes; Pétur Sigurðsson (D), 17,243 votes; Ragnhildur Helgadóttir (D), 18,158 votes; Sigríður Dúna Kristmundsdóttir (V), 4,246 votes; Svavar Gestsson (G), 9,630 votes; and Vilmundur Gylfason (C), 4,780 votes.
- Compensatory seats - Guðrún Agnarsdóttir (V), 4,070 votes; Guðrún Helgadóttir (G), 8,815 votes; Jóhanna Sigurðardóttir (A), 5,242 votes; and Kristín S. Kvaran (C), 4,581 votes.

==== 1970s ====
===== 1979 =====
Results of the 1979 parliamentary election held on 2 and 3 December 1979:

Party		Votes	%	Seats		
Party		Votes	%	Con.	Com.	Tot.
Independence Party	D	21,428	43.82%	5	1	6
People's Alliance	G	10,888	22.27%	3	1	4
Social Democratic Party	A	8,691	17.77%	2	1	3
Progressive Party	B	7,252	14.83%	2	0	2
Revolutionary Communist Faction	R	480	0.98%	0	0	0
The Other Party	H	158	0.32%	0	0	0
Valid votes		48,897	100.00%	12	3	15
Blank votes		1,143	2.28%			
Rejected votes – other		119	0.24%			
Total polled		50,159	88.93%			
Registered electors		56,402				

The following candidates were elected:

- Constituency seats - Albert Guðmundsson (D), 20,465 votes; Benedikt Sigurðsson Gröndal (A), 8,650 votes; Birgir Ísleifur Gunnarsson (D), 19,633 votes; Friðrik Klemenz Sophusson (D), 17,833 votes; Geir Hallgrímsson (D), 21,330 votes; Gunnar Thoroddsen (D), 18,697 votes; Guðmundur J. Guðmundsson (G), 10,383 votes; Guðmundur G. Þórarinsson (B), 6,916 votes; Ólafur Jóhannesson (B), 7,246 votes; Ólafur Ragnar Grímsson (G), 9,937 votes; Svavar Gestsson (G), 10,877 votes; and Vilmundur Gylfason (A), 8,306 votes.
- Compensatory seats - Guðrún Helgadóttir (G), 9,527 votes; Jóhanna Sigurðardóttir (A), 7,959 votes; and Pétur Sigurðsson (D), 16,948 votes.

===== 1978 =====
Results of the 1978 parliamentary election held on 25 June 1978:

Party		Votes	%	Seats		
Party		Votes	%	Con.	Com.	Tot.
Independence Party	D	19,515	39.55%	5	1	6
People's Alliance	G	12,016	24.35%	3	1	4
Social Democratic Party	A	11,159	22.61%	3	1	4
Progressive Party	B	4,116	8.34%	1	0	1
Union of Liberals and Leftists	F	1,942	3.94%	0	0	0
The Political Party	S	284	0.58%	0	0	0
Revolutionary Communist League	R	184	0.37%	0	0	0
Communist Party of Iceland (Marxist–Leninist)	K	128	0.26%	0	0	0
Valid votes		49,344	100.00%	12	3	15
Blank votes		636	1.27%			
Rejected votes – other		117	0.23%			
Total polled		50,097	89.96%			
Registered electors		55,691				

The following candidates were elected:

- Constituency seats - Albert Guðmundsson (D), 19,375 votes; Benedikt Sigurðsson Gröndal (A), 11,122 votes; Einar Ágústsson (B), 4,103 votes; Ellert Schram (D), 17,050 votes; Eðvarð Sigurðsson (G), 11,504 votes; Geir Hallgrímsson (D), 18,556 votes; Gunnar Thoroddsen (D), 16,200 votes; Jóhanna Sigurðardóttir (A), 10,224 votes; Ragnhildur Helgadóttir (D), 17,875 votes; Svava Jakobsdóttir (G), 11,004 votes; Svavar Gestsson (G), 11,987 votes; and Vilmundur Gylfason (A), 10,677 votes.
- Compensatory seats - Björn Jónsson (A), 9,754 votes; Friðrik Klemenz Sophusson (D), 15,413 votes; and Ólafur Ragnar Grímsson (G), 10,430 votes.

===== 1974 =====
Results of the 1974 parliamentary election held on 30 June 1974:

Party		Votes	%	Seats		
Party		Votes	%	Con.	Com.	Tot.
Independence Party	D	24,023	50.08%	7	1	8
People's Alliance	G	9,874	20.58%	2	1	3
Progressive Party	B	8,014	16.71%	2	0	2
Social Democratic Party	A	4,071	8.49%	1	1	2
Union of Liberals and Leftists	F	1,650	3.44%	0	1	1
Revolutionary Communist League	R	149	0.31%	0	0	0
Communist Party of Iceland (Marxist–Leninist)	K	121	0.25%	0	0	0
Democratic Party	N	67	0.14%	0	0	0
Valid votes		47,969	100.00%	12	4	16
Blank votes		408	0.84%			
Rejected votes – other		106	0.22%			
Total polled		48,483	91.37%			
Registered electors		53,062				

The following candidates were elected:

- Constituency seats - Albert Guðmundsson (D), 17,938 votes; Einar Ágústsson (B), 7,678 votes; Ellert Schram (D), 19,000 votes; Eðvarð Sigurðsson (G), 9,453 votes; Geir Hallgrímsson (D), 23,986 votes; Gunnar Thoroddsen (D), 22,998 votes; Gylfi Þorsteinsson Gíslason (A), 4,005 votes; Jóhann Hafstein (D), 20,960 votes; Magnús Kjartansson (G), 9,872 votes; Pétur Sigurðsson (D), 20,000 votes; Ragnhildur Helgadóttir (D), 22,013 votes; and Þórarinn Þórarinsson (B), 8,001 votes.
- Compensatory seats - Eggert Gíslason Þorsteinsson (A), 2,036 votes; Guðmundur H. Garðarsson (D), 3,003 votes; Magnús Torfi Ólafsson (F), 1,650 votes; and Svava Jakobsdóttir (G), 3,291 votes.

===== 1971 =====
Results of the 1971 parliamentary election held on 13 June 1971:

Party		Votes	%	Seats		
Party		Votes	%	Con.	Com.	Tot.
Independence Party	D	18,884	42.59%	6	1	7
People's Alliance	G	8,851	19.96%	2	1	3
Progressive Party	B	6,766	15.26%	2	0	2
Social Democratic Party	A	4,468	10.08%	1	1	2
Union of Liberals and Leftists	F	4,017	9.06%	1	1	2
Candidature Party	O	1,353	3.05%	0	0	0
Valid votes		44,339	100.00%	12	4	16
Blank votes		497	1.11%			
Rejected votes – other		99	0.22%			
Total polled		44,935	89.57%			
Registered electors		50,170				

The following candidates were elected:

- Constituency seats - Auður Auðuns (D), 16,499 votes; Einar Ágústsson (B), 6,482 votes; Eðvarð Sigurðsson (G), 8,473 votes; Geir Hallgrímsson (D), 18,058 votes; Gunnar Thoroddsen (D), 17,127 votes; Gylfi Þorsteinsson Gíslason (A), 4,446 votes; Jóhann Hafstein (D), 18,794 votes; Magnús Kjartansson (G), 8,845 votes; Magnús Torfi Ólafsson (F), 4,015 votes; Pétur Sigurðsson (D), 15,729 votes; Ragnhildur Helgadóttir (D), 14,947 votes; and Þórarinn Þórarinsson (B), 6,755 votes.
- Compensatory seats - Bjarni Guðnason (F), 2,009 votes; Eggert Gíslason Þorsteinsson (A), 2,234 votes; Ellert Schram (D), 2,698 votes; and Svava Jakobsdóttir (G), 2,950 votes.

==== 1960s ====
===== 1967 =====
Results of the 1967 parliamentary election held on 11 June 1967:

Party		Votes	%	Seats		
Party		Votes	%	Con.	Com.	Tot.
Independence Party	D	17,510	42.87%	6	1	7
Social Democratic Party	A	7,138	17.48%	2	1	3
Progressive Party	B	6,829	16.72%	2	0	2
People's Alliance	G	5,423	13.28%	1	1	2
Independent	I	3,520	8.62%	1	0	1
Independent Democratic Party	H	420	1.03%	0	0	0
Valid votes		40,840	100.00%	12	3	15
Blank votes		563	1.36%			
Rejected votes – other		122	0.29%			
Total polled		41,525	91.43%			
Registered electors		45,419				

The following candidates were elected:

- Constituency seats - Auður Auðuns (D), 16,755 votes; Birgir Kjaran (D), 15,314 votes; Bjarni Benediktsson (D), 17,468 votes; Eggert Gíslason Þorsteinsson (A), 6,838 votes; Einar Ágústsson (B), 6,541 votes; Gylfi Þorsteinsson Gíslason (A), 7,128 votes; Hannibal Valdimarsson (I), 3,519 votes; Jóhann Hafstein (D), 15,978 votes; Magnús Kjartansson (G), 5,419 votes; Ólafur Björnsson (D), 13,866 votes; Pétur Sigurðsson (D), 14,585 votes; and Þórarinn Þórarinsson (B), 6,823 votes.
- Compensatory seats - Eðvarð Sigurðsson (G), 2,712 votes; Sigurður Ingimundarson (A), 2,379 votes; and Sveinn Guðmundsson (D), 2,501 votes.

===== 1963 =====
Results of the 1963 parliamentary election held on 9 June 1963:

Party		Votes	%	Seats		
Party		Votes	%	Con.	Com.	Tot.
Independence Party	D	19,122	50.71%	6	1	7
People's Alliance	G	6,678	17.71%	2	1	3
Progressive Party	B	6,178	16.38%	2	0	2
Social Democratic Party	A	5,730	15.20%	2	1	3
Valid votes		37,708	100.00%	12	3	15
Blank votes		530	1.38%			
Rejected votes – other		102	0.27%			
Total polled		38,340	90.74%			
Registered electors		42,251				

The following candidates were elected:

- Constituency seats - Alfreð Gíslason (G), 6,387 votes; Auður Auðuns (D), 18,319 votes; Bjarni Benediktsson (D), 19,112 votes; Eggert Gíslason Þorsteinsson (A), 5,489 votes; Einar Ágústsson (B), 5,918 votes; Einar Olgeirsson (G), 6,671 votes; Gunnar Thoroddsen (D), 16,716 votes; Gylfi Þorsteinsson Gíslason (A), 5,725 votes; Jóhann Hafstein (D), 17,523 votes; Ólafur Björnsson (D), 15,136 votes; Pétur Sigurðsson (D), 15,921 votes; and Þórarinn Þórarinsson (B), 6,166 votes.
- Compensatory seats - Davíð Ólafsson (D), 2,732 votes; Eðvarð Sigurðsson (G), 2,226 votes; and Sigurður Ingimundarson (A), 1,910 votes.

==== 1950s ====
===== October 1959 =====
Results of the October 1959 parliamentary election held on 25 and 26 October 1959:

Party		Votes	%	Seats		
Party		Votes	%	Con.	Com.	Tot.
Independence Party	D	16,474	46.66%	7	1	8
People's Alliance	G	6,543	18.53%	2	1	3
Social Democratic Party	A	5,946	16.84%	2	1	3
Progressive Party	B	4,100	11.61%	1	0	1
National Preservation Party	F	2,247	6.36%	0	0	0
Valid votes		35,310	100.00%	12	3	15
Blank votes		419	1.17%			
Rejected votes – other		70	0.20%			
Total polled		35,799	89.43%			
Registered electors		40,028				

The following candidates were elected:

- Constituency seats - Alfreð Gíslason (G), 6,266 votes; Auður Auðuns (D), 15,777 votes; Bjarni Benediktsson (D), 16,454 votes; Eggert Gíslason Þorsteinsson (A), 5,692 votes; Einar Olgeirsson (G), 6,541 votes; Gunnar Thoroddsen (D), 14,400 votes; Gylfi Þorsteinsson Gíslason (A), 5,930 votes; Jóhann Hafstein (D), 15,093 votes; Ólafur Björnsson (D), 13,040 votes; Pétur Sigurðsson (D), 12,344 votes; Ragnhildur Helgadóttir (D), 13,727 votes; and Þórarinn Þórarinsson (B), 4,097 votes.
- Compensatory seats - Birgir Kjaran (D), 2,059 votes; Eðvarð Sigurðsson (G), 2,181 votes; and Sigurður Ingimundarson (A), 1,982 votes.

===== June 1959 =====
Results of the June 1959 parliamentary election held on 28 June 1959:

Party		Votes			%	Seats		
Party		Con.	Nat.	Tot.	%	Con.	Com.	Tot.
Independence Party	D	17,500	443	17,943	50.99%	5	0	5
People's Alliance	G	6,412	186	6,598	18.75%	1	1	2
Social Democratic Party	A	4,591	110	4,701	13.36%	1	1	2
Progressive Party	B	4,339	107	4,446	12.64%	1	0	1
National Preservation Party	F	1,445	53	1,498	4.26%	0	0	0
Valid votes		34,287	899	35,186	100.00%	8	2	10
Blank votes				431	1.21%			
Rejected votes – other				80	0.22%			
Total polled				35,697	89.96%			
Registered electors				39,679				

The following candidates were elected:

- Constituency seats - Bjarni Benediktsson (D), 17,470 votes; Björn Ólafsson (D), 16,270 votes; Einar Olgeirsson (G), 6,403 votes; Gunnar Thoroddsen (D), 14,199 votes; Gylfi Þorsteinsson Gíslason (A), 4,543 votes; Jóhann Hafstein (D), 15,291 votes; Ragnhildur Helgadóttir (D), 13,130 votes; and Þórarinn Þórarinsson (B), 4,320 votes.
- Compensatory seats - Eggert Gíslason Þorsteinsson (A), 2,351 votes; and Hannibal Valdimarsson (G), 3,299 votes.

===== 1956 =====
Results of the 1956 parliamentary election held on 24 June 1956:

Party		Votes			%	Seats		
Party		Con.	Nat.	Tot.	%	Con.	Com.	Tot.
Independence Party	D	16,427	501	16,928	50.38%	5	1	6
People's Alliance	G	7,917	323	8,240	24.52%	2	1	3
Social Democratic Party	A	6,091	215	6,306	18.77%	1	1	2
National Preservation Party	F	1,905	73	1,978	5.89%	0	0	0
Progressive Party	B	-	151	151	0.45%	0	0	0
Valid votes		32,340	1,263	33,603	100.00%	8	3	11
Blank votes				521	1.51%			
Rejected votes – other				448	1.30%			
Total polled				34,572	91.94%			
Registered electors				37,603				

The following candidates were elected:

- Constituency seats - Bjarni Benediktsson (D), 16,380 votes; Björn Ólafsson (D), 15,106 votes; Einar Olgeirsson (G), 7,904 votes; Gunnar Thoroddsen (D), 13,328 votes; Hannibal Valdimarsson (G), 7,410 votes; Haraldur Guðmundsson (A), 6,055 votes; Jóhann Hafstein (D), 14,341 votes; and Ragnhildur Helgadóttir (D), 12,326 votes.
- Compensatory seats - Alfreð Gíslason (G), 2,747 votes; Gylfi Þorsteinsson Gíslason (A), 3,153 votes; and Ólafur Björnsson (D), 2,821 votes.

===== 1953 =====
Results of the 1953 parliamentary election held on 28 June 1953:

Party		Votes			%	Seats		
Party		Con.	Nat.	Tot.	%	Con.	Com.	Tot.
Independence Party	D	11,989	256	12,245	39.24%	4	0	4
People's Unity Party – Socialist Party	C	6,558	146	6,704	21.48%	2	1	3
Social Democratic Party	A	4,846	90	4,936	15.82%	1	1	2
National Preservation Party	F	2,575	155	2,730	8.75%	1	1	2
Progressive Party	B	2,554	70	2,624	8.41%	0	0	0
Republican Party	E	1,890	80	1,970	6.31%	0	0	0
Valid votes		30,412	797	31,209	100.00%	8	3	11
Blank votes				453	1.43%			
Rejected votes – other				83	0.26%			
Total polled				31,745	89.55%			
Registered electors				35,451				

The following candidates were elected:

- Constituency seats - Bjarni Benediktsson (D), 11,800 votes; Björn Ólafsson (D), 10,312 votes; Einar Olgeirsson (C), 6,556 votes; Gils Guðmundsson (F), 2,570 votes; Gunnar Thoroddsen (D), 9,551 votes; Haraldur Guðmundsson (A), 4,832 votes; Jóhann Hafstein (D), 10,296 votes; and Sigurður Guðnason (C), 6,143 votes.
- Compensatory seats - Bergur Sigurbjörnsson (F), 1,365 votes; Brynjólfur Bjarnason (C), 2,235 votes; and Gylfi Þorsteinsson Gíslason (A), 2,468 votes.

==== 1940s ====
===== 1949 =====
Results of the 1949 parliamentary election held on 23 and 24 October 1949:

Party		Votes			%	Seats		
Party		Con.	Nat.	Tot.	%	Con.	Com.	Tot.
Independence Party	D	12,768	222	12,990	45.52%	4	1	5
People's Unity Party – Socialist Party	C	8,057	76	8,133	28.50%	2	1	3
Social Democratic Party	A	4,376	44	4,420	15.49%	1	1	2
Progressive Party	B	2,967	29	2,996	10.50%	1	0	1
Valid votes		28,168	371	28,539	100.00%	8	3	11
Blank votes				362	1.25%			
Rejected votes – other				80	0.28%			
Total polled				28,981	88.88%			
Registered electors				32,606				

The following candidates were elected:

- Constituency seats - Bjarni Benediktsson (D), 12,683 votes; Björn Ólafsson (D), 11,615 votes; Einar Olgeirsson (C), 8,141 votes; Gunnar Thoroddsen (D), 10,324 votes; Haraldur Guðmundsson (A), 4,346 votes; Jóhann Hafstein (D), 10,564 votes; Rannveig Þorsteinsdóttir (B), 2,956 votes; and Sigurður Guðnason (C), 7,541 votes.
- Compensatory seats - Brynjólfur Bjarnason (C), 2,711 votes; Gylfi Þorsteinsson Gíslason (A), 2,210 votes; and Kristín L. Sigurðardóttir (D), 2,598 votes.

===== 1946 =====
Results of the 1946 parliamentary election held on 30 June 1946:

Party		Votes			%	Seats		
Party		Con.	Nat.	Tot.	%	Con.	Com.	Tot.
Independence Party	D	11,336	244	11,580	47.12%	4	1	5
People's Unity Party – Socialist Party	C	6,889	101	6,990	28.44%	3	1	4
Social Democratic Party	A	4,530	40	4,570	18.60%	1	1	2
Progressive Party	B	1,427	9	1,436	5.84%	0	0	0
Valid votes		24,182	394	24,576	100.00%	8	3	11
Blank votes				215	0.86%			
Rejected votes – other				84	0.34%			
Total polled				24,875	86.72%			
Registered electors				28,683				

The following candidates were elected:

- Constituency seats - Einar Olgeirsson (C), 6,877 votes; Gylfi Þorsteinsson Gíslason (A), 4,484 votes; Hallgrímur Benediktsson (D), 10,572 votes; Jóhann Hafstein (D), 9,105 votes; Pétur Magnússon (D), 11,268 votes; Sigfús Sigurhjartarson (C), 6,446 votes; Sigurður Guðnason (C), 6,015 votes; and Sigurður Kristjánsson (D), 9,842 votes.
- Compensatory seats - Bjarni Benediktsson (D), 2,316 votes; Katrín Thoroddsen (C), 1,748 votes; and Sigurjón Á. Ólafsson (A), 1,285 votes.

===== October 1942 =====
Results of the October 1942 parliamentary election held on 18 and 19 October 1942:

Party		Votes			%	Seats		
Party		Con.	Nat.	Tot.	%	Con.	Com.	Tot.
Independence Party	D	8,170	122	8,292	41.87%	4	1	5
People's Unity Party – Socialist Party	C	5,928	52	5,980	30.20%	3	1	4
Social Democratic Party	A	3,278	25	3,303	16.68%	1	1	2
National Republican Party	E	1,284	-	1,284	6.48%	0	0	0
Progressive Party	B	939	6	945	4.77%	0	0	0
Valid votes		19,599	205	19,804	100.00%	8	3	11
Blank votes				211	1.05%			
Rejected votes – other				43	0.21%			
Total polled				20,058	81.07%			
Registered electors				24,741				

The following candidates were elected:

- Constituency seats - Bjarni Benediktsson (D), 6,936 votes; Brynjólfur Bjarnason (C), 5,549 votes; Einar Olgeirsson (C), 5,921 votes; Jakob Möller (D), 7,230 votes; Magnús Jónsson (D), 7,766 votes; Sigfús Sigurhjartarson (C), 5,181 votes; Sigurður Kristjánsson (D), 6,621 votes; and Stefán Jóhann Stefánsson (A), 3,226 votes.
- Compensatory seats - Haraldur Guðmundsson (A), 1,652 votes; Pétur Magnússon (D), 1,658 votes; and Sigurður Guðnason (C), 1,495 votes.

===== July 1942 =====
Results of the July 1942 parliamentary election held on 5 July 1942:

Party		Votes			%	Seats		
Party		Con.	Nat.	Tot.	%	Con.	Com.	Tot.
Independence Party	D	8,696	105	8,801	46.12%	3	1	4
People's Unity Party – Socialist Party	C	5,296	39	5,335	27.96%	2	1	3
Social Democratic Party	A	3,290	29	3,319	17.39%	1	1	2
Progressive Party	B	889	16	905	4.74%	0	0	0
Republican Party	E	618	-	618	3.24%	0	0	0
Liberal Left	F	103	-	103	0.54%	0	0	0
Valid votes		18,892	189	19,081	100.00%	6	3	9
Blank votes				198	1.02%			
Rejected votes – other				81	0.42%			
Total polled				19,360	78.56%			
Registered electors				24,644				

The following candidates were elected:

- Constituency seats - Bjarni Benediktsson (D), 7,122 votes; Brynjólfur Bjarnason (C), 4,848 votes; Einar Olgeirsson (C), 5,290 votes; Jakob Möller (D), 7,853 votes; Magnús Jónsson (D), 8,553 votes; and Stefán Jóhann Stefánsson (A), 3,163 votes.
- Compensatory seats - Sigfús Sigurhjartarson (C), 4,409 votes; Sigurður Kristjánsson (D), 6,623 votes; and Sigurjón Á. Ólafsson (A), 3,015 votes.

==== 1930s ====
===== 1937 =====
Results of the 1937 parliamentary election held on 29 June 1937:

Party		Votes			%	Seats		
Party		Con.	Nat.	Tot.	%	Con.	Com.	Tot.
Independence Party	S	10,026	112	10,138	55.95%	4	1	5
Social Democratic Party	A	4,096	39	4,135	22.82%	1	1	2
Communist Party of Iceland	K	2,718	24	2,742	15.13%	1	1	2
Progressive Party	F	1,020	27	1,047	5.78%	0	0	0
Farmers' Party	B	-	59	59	0.33%	0	0	0
Valid votes		17,860	261	18,121	100.00%	6	3	9
Blank votes				113	0.62%			
Rejected votes – other				97	0.53%			
Total polled				18,331	89.15%			
Registered electors				20,563				

The following candidates were elected:

- Constituency seats - Einar Olgeirsson (K), 2,718 votes; Héðinn Valdimarsson (A), 4,069 votes; Jakob Möller (S), 9,130 votes; Magnús Jónsson (S), 10,005 votes; Pétur Halldórsson (S), 8,340 votes; and Sigurður Kristjánsson (S), 7,497 votes.
- Compensatory seats - Brynjólfur Bjarnason (K), 2,489 votes; Guðrún Lárusdóttir (S), 6,658 votes; and Sigurjón Á. Ólafsson (A), 3,728 votes.

===== 1934 =====
Results of the 1934 parliamentary election held on 24 June 1934:

Party		Votes			%	Seats		
Party		Con.	Nat.	Tot.	%	Con.	Com.	Tot.
Independence Party	S	7,419	106	7,525	50.91%	4	1	5
Social Democratic Party	A	4,989	50	5,039	34.09%	2	1	3
Communist Party of Iceland	K	1,002	12	1,014	6.86%	0	0	0
Progressive Party	F	790	15	805	5.45%	0	0	0
Nationalist Party	Þ	215	-	215	1.45%	0	0	0
Farmers' Party	B	170	13	183	1.24%	0	0	0
Valid votes		14,585	196	14,781	100.00%	6	2	8
Blank votes				59	0.40%			
Rejected votes – other				45	0.30%			
Total polled				14,885	81.09%			
Registered electors				18,357				

The following candidates were elected:

- Constituency seats - Héðinn Valdimarsson (A), 4,982 votes; Jakob Möller (S), 6,306 votes; Magnús Jónsson (S), 7,392 votes; Pétur Halldórsson (S), 6,202 votes; Sigurjón Á. Ólafsson (A), 4,564 votes; and Sigurður Kristjánsson (S), 5,565 votes.
- Compensatory seats - Guðrún Lárusdóttir (S), 4,941 votes; and Stefán Jóhann Stefánsson (A), 4,156 votes.

===== 1933 =====
Results of the 1933 parliamentary election held on 16 July 1933:

Party		Votes	%	Seats
Independence Party	S	5,693	58.85%	3
Social Democratic Party	A	3,244	33.53%	1
Communist Party of Iceland	K	737	7.62%	0
Valid votes		9,674	100.00%	4
Blank votes		56	0.57%	
Rejected votes – other		49	0.50%	
Total polled		9,779	67.42%	
Registered electors		14,504		

The following candidates were elected: Héðinn Valdimarsson (A), 3,239 votes; Jakob Möller (S), 5,569 votes; Magnús Jónsson (S), 4,273 votes; and Pétur Halldórsson (S), 2,902 votes.

===== 1931 =====
Results of the 1931 parliamentary election held on 12 June 1931:

Party		Votes	%	Seats
Independence Party	S	5,576	57.55%	3
Social Democratic Party	A	2,628	27.12%	1
Progressive Party	F	1,234	12.74%	0
Communist Party of Iceland	K	251	2.59%	0
Valid votes		9,689	100.00%	4
Blank votes		43	0.44%	
Rejected votes – other		17	0.17%	
Total polled		9,749	78.16%	
Registered electors		12,473		

The following candidates were elected: Einar Arnórsson (S), 4,174 votes; Héðinn Valdimarsson (A), 2,625 votes; Jakob Möller (S), 5,543 votes; and Magnús Jónsson (S), 2,802 votes.

==== 1920s ====
===== 1927 =====
Results of the 1927 parliamentary election held on 9 July 1927:

Party		Votes	%	Seats
Conservative Party	Í	3,550	49.30%	2
Social Democratic Party	A	2,493	34.62%	2
Liberal Party	Fl	1,158	16.08%	0
Valid votes		7,201	100.00%	4
Rejected votes		19	0.26%	
Total polled		7,220	72.31%	
Registered electors		9,985		

The following candidates were elected: Héðinn Valdimarsson (A), 2,487 votes; Jón Ólafsson (Í), 2,649 votes; Magnús Jónsson (Í), 3,440 votes; and Sigurjón Á. Ólafsson (A), 1,858 votes.

===== 1923 =====
Results of the 1923 parliamentary election held on 27 October 1923:

Party		Votes	%	Seats
Citizens' Party	B	4,944	66.49%	3
Social Democratic Party	A	2,492	33.51%	1
Valid votes		7,436	100.00%	4
Blank votes		15	0.20%	
Rejected votes – other		26	0.35%	
Total polled		7,477	84.12%	
Registered electors		8,889		

The following candidates were elected: Jón Baldvinsson (A), 2,491 votes; Jón Þorláksson (B), 4,879 votes; Jakob Möller (B), 3,697 votes; and Magnús Jónsson (B), 2,478 votes.

==== 1910s ====
===== 1919 =====
Results of the 1919 parliamentary election held on 15 November 1919:

Candidate	Party		Candidate		Party	
Candidate	Party		Votes	%	Votes	%
Sveinn Björnsson	Independent (Home Rule Party)	U(H)	2,589	36.09%	2,013	56.12%
Jón Magnússon	Home Rule Party	H	1,437	20.03%	2,013	56.12%
Óiafur Friðriksson	Social Democratic Party	A	863	12.03%	853	23.78%
Þorvarður Þorvaröarson	Social Democratic Party	A	843	11.75%	853	23.78%
Jakob Möller	Independent (Independence Party)	U(S)	1,442	20.10%	721	20.10%
Valid votes			7,174	100.00%	3,587	100.00%
Blank votes					2	0.05%
Rejected votes – other					88	2.39%
Total polled					3,677	66.72%
Registered electors					5,511	

Jakob Möller (U(S)) and Sveinn Björnsson (U(H)) were elected.

===== October 1916 =====
Results of the October 1916 parliamentary election held on 21 October 1916:

Candidate	Party		Candidate		Party	
Candidate	Party		Votes	%	Votes	%
Jörundur Brynjólfsson	Social Democratic Party	A	797	21.40%	748.5	40.20%
Þorvarður Þorvaröarson	Social Democratic Party	A	700	18.80%	748.5	40.20%
Jón Magnússon	Home Rule Party	H	725	19.47%	710.0	38.13%
Knud Zimsen	Home Rule Party	H	695	18.66%	710.0	38.13%
Sveinn Björnsson	Independence Party (Langsum)	Sl	522	14.02%	403.5	21.67%
Magnús Blöndahl	Independence Party (Langsum)	Sl	285	7.65%	403.5	21.67%
Valid votes			3,724	100.00%	1,862.0	100.00%
Blank votes					12.0	0.60%
Rejected votes – other					129.0	6.44%
Total polled					2,003.0	43.71%
Registered electors					4,582.0	

Jón Magnússon (H) and Jörundur Brynjólfsson (A) were elected.

===== 1914 =====
Results of the 1914 parliamentary election held on 11 April 1914:

Candidate	Votes	%
Sveinn Björnsson	700	25.20%
Jón Magnússon	655	23.58%
Jón Þorláksson	605	21.78%
Sigurður Jónsson	498	17.93%
Lárus H. Bjarnason	320	11.52%
Total	2,778	100.00%
Valid votes	1,389	
Rejected votes	16	1.14%
Total polled	1,405	62.33%
Registered electors	2,254	

Jón Magnússon and Sveinn Björnsson were elected.

===== 1911 =====
Results of the 1911 parliamentary election held on 28 October 1911:

Candidate	Votes	%
Lárus H. Bjarnason	924	27.53%
Jón Jónsson	874	26.04%
Jón Þorkelsson	653	19.46%
Magnús Blöndahl	651	19.40%
Halldór Daníelsson	172	5.13%
Guðmundur Finnbogason	82	2.44%
Total	3,356	100.00%
Valid votes	1,678	
Rejected votes	54	3.12%
Total polled	1,732	77.36%
Registered electors	2,239	

Jón Jónsson and Lárus H. Bjarnason were elected.

==== 1900s ====
===== 1908 =====
Results of the 1908 parliamentary election held on 10 September 1908:

Candidate	Votes	%
Jón Þorkelsson	579	28.72%
Magnús Blöndahl	529	26.24%
Guðmundur Björnsson	455	22.57%
Jón Þorláksson	453	22.47%
Total	2,016	100.00%
Valid votes	1,008	
Rejected votes	84	7.69%
Total polled	1,092	65.90%
Registered electors	1,657	

Jón Þorkelsson and Magnús Blöndahl were elected.
