= Cabinet of Bjarni Benediktsson =

Government of Iceland from 1963 to 1970

- 22nd Cabinet of Iceland
- Date formed: 14 November 1963
- Date dissolved: 10 July 1970

People and organisations
- Head of state: Kristján Eldjárn
- Head of government: Bjarni Benediktsson
- Member parties: Independence Party (IP); Social Democratic Party (SDP)

History
- Outgoing election: 1967 election
- Predecessor: Ólafur Thors V
- Successor: Jóhann Hafstein

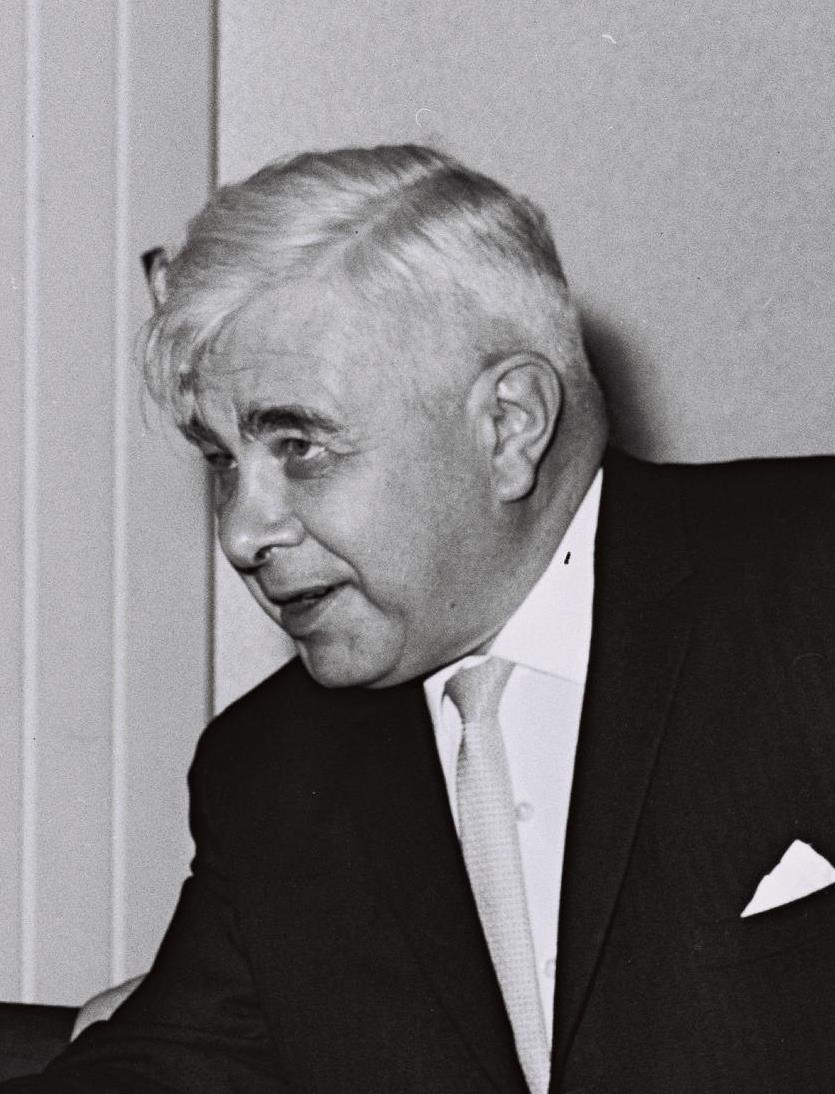
Bjarni Benediktsson

The Cabinet of Bjarni Benediktsson in Iceland, nicknamed “The restoration government” (Icelandic: Viðreisnarstjórnin) or “The work government” (Icelandic: Starfstjórnin), was formed 14 November 1963. It dissolved 10 July 1970 due to the death of the Prime Minister, Bjarni Benediktsson, who was killed in a house fire the night before along with his wife and grandson.

== Cabinets ==
=== Inaugural cabinet: 14 November 1963 – 8 May 1965 ===
Incumbent	Minister	Party
Bjarni Benediktsson	Prime Minister (Forsætisráðherra)	IP
Emil Jónsson	Minister of Fisheries (Sjávarútvegsráðherra)	SDP
Emil Jónsson	Minister of Social Affairs (Félagsmálaráðherra)	SDP
Guðmundur Ívarsson Guðmundsson	Minister for Foreign Affairs (Utanríkisráðherra)	SDP
Gunnar Thoroddsen	Minister of Finance (Fjármálaráðherra)	IP
Gylfi Þorsteinsson Gíslason	Minister of Education, Science and Culture (Menntamálaráðherra)	SDP
Gylfi Þorsteinsson Gíslason	Minister of Commerce (Viðskiptaráðherra)	SDP
Ingólfur Jónsson	Minister of Agriculture (Landbúnaðarráðherra)	IP
Ingólfur Jónsson	Minister of Communications (Samgönguráðherra)	IP
Jóhann Hafstein	Minister of Health (Heilbrigðisráðherra)	IP
Jóhann Hafstein	Minister of Industry (Iðnaðarráðherra)	IP
Jóhann Hafstein	Minister of Justice and Ecclesiastical Affairs (Dóms- og kirkjumálaráðherra)	IP

=== First reshuffle: 8 May 1965 – 31 August 1965 ===
Magnús Jónsson replaced Gunnar Thoroddsen as Minister of Finance.

Incumbent	Minister	Party
Bjarni Benediktsson	Prime Minister (Forsætisráðherra)	IP
Emil Jónsson	Minister of Fisheries (Sjávarútvegsráðherra)	SDP
Emil Jónsson	Minister of Social Affairs (Félagsmálaráðherra)	SDP
Guðmundur Ívarsson Guðmundsson	Minister for Foreign Affairs (Utanríkisráðherra)	SDP
Gylfi Þorsteinsson Gíslason	Minister of Education, Science and Culture (Menntamálaráðherra)	SDP
Gylfi Þorsteinsson Gíslason	Minister of Commerce (Viðskiptaráðherra)	SDP
Ingólfur Jónsson	Minister of Agriculture (Landbúnaðarráðherra)	IP
Ingólfur Jónsson	Minister of Communications (Samgönguráðherra)	IP
Jóhann Hafstein	Minister of Health (Heilbrigðisráðherra)	IP
Jóhann Hafstein	Minister of Industry (Iðnaðarráðherra)	IP
Jóhann Hafstein	Minister of Justice and Ecclesiastical Affairs (Dóms- og kirkjumálaráðherra)	IP
Magnús Jónsson	Minister of Finance (Fjármálaráðherra)	IP

=== Second reshuffle: 31 August 1965 – 1 January 1970 ===
Eggert Gíslason Þorsteinsson replaced Emil Jónsson as Minister of Fisheries and Minister of Social Affairs. Emil Jónsson replaced Guðmundur Ívarsson Guðmundsson as Minister for Foreign Affairs.

Incumbent	Minister	Party
Bjarni Benediktsson	Prime Minister (Forsætisráðherra)	IP
Eggert Gíslason Þorsteinsson	Minister of Fisheries (Sjávarútvegsráðherra)	SDP
Eggert Gíslason Þorsteinsson	Minister of Social Affairs (Félagsmálaráðherra)	SDP
Emil Jónsson	Minister for Foreign Affairs (Utanríkisráðherra)	SDP
Gylfi Þorsteinsson Gíslason	Minister of Education, Science and Culture (Menntamálaráðherra)	SDP
Gylfi Þorsteinsson Gíslason	Minister of Commerce (Viðskiptaráðherra)	SDP
Ingólfur Jónsson	Minister of Agriculture (Landbúnaðarráðherra)	IP
Ingólfur Jónsson	Minister of Communications (Samgönguráðherra)	IP
Jóhann Hafstein	Minister of Health (Heilbrigðisráðherra)	IP
Jóhann Hafstein	Minister of Industry (Iðnaðarráðherra)	IP
Jóhann Hafstein	Minister of Justice and Ecclesiastical Affairs (Dóms- og kirkjumálaráðherra)	IP
Magnús Jónsson	Minister of Finance (Fjármálaráðherra)	IP

=== Third reshuffle: 1 January 1970 – 10 July 1970 ===
The Cabinet of Iceland Act no. 73/1969, which had been passed by the parliament 28 May 1969, took effect on 1 January 1970. Thus the Cabinet was formally established along with its ministries which had up until then not formally existed separately from the ministers. The Ministry of Health (Heilbrigðisráðuneytið) was renamed the Ministry of Health and Social Security (Heilbrigðis- og tryggingamálaráðherra) and Eggert Gíslason Þorsteinsson replaced Jóhann Hafstein as minister. Emil Jónsson replaced Jóhann Hafstein as Minister of Social Affairs. Statistics Iceland became a cabinet ministry and was led by Magnús Jónsson.

Incumbent	Minister	Ministry	Party
Bjarni Benediktsson	Prime Minister (Forsætisráðherra)	Prime Minister's Office (Forsætisráðuneytið)	IP
Eggert Gíslason Þorsteinsson	Minister of Fisheries (Sjávarútvegsráðherra)	Ministry of Fisheries (Sjávarútvegsráðuneytið)	SDP
Eggert Gíslason Þorsteinsson	Minister of Health and Social Security (Heilbrigðis- og tryggingamálaráðherra)	Ministry of Health and Social Security (Heilbrigðis- og tryggingamálaráðuneytið)	SDP
Emil Jónsson	Minister for Foreign Affairs (Utanríkisráðherra)	Ministry for Foreign Affairs (Utanríkisráðuneytið)	SDP
Emil Jónsson	Minister of Social Affairs (Félagsmálaráðherra)	Ministry of Social Affairs (Félagsmálaráðuneytið)	SDP
Gylfi Þorsteinsson Gíslason	Minister of Education, Science and Culture (Menntamálaráðherra)	Ministry of Education, Science and Culture (Menntamálaráðuneytið)	SDP
Gylfi Þorsteinsson Gíslason	Minister of Commerce (Viðskiptaráðherra)	Ministry of Commerce (Viðskiptaráðuneytið)	SDP
Ingólfur Jónsson	Minister of Agriculture (Landbúnaðarráðherra)	Ministry of Agriculture (Landbúnaðarráðuneytið)	IP
Ingólfur Jónsson	Minister of Communications (Samgönguráðherra)	Ministry of Communications (Samgönguráðuneytið)	IP
Jóhann Hafstein	Minister of Industry (Iðnaðarráðherra)	Ministry of Industry (Iðnaðarráðuneytið)	IP
Jóhann Hafstein	Minister of Justice and Ecclesiastical Affairs (Dóms- og kirkjumálaráðherra)	Ministry of Justice and Ecclesiastical Affairs (Dóms- og kirkjumálaráðuneytið)	IP
Magnús Jónsson	Minister of Finance (Fjármálaráðherra)	Ministry of Finance (Fjármálaráðuneytið)	IP
Magnús Jónsson	Minister of Statistics Iceland (Ráðherra Hagstofu Íslands)	Statistics Iceland (Hagstofa Íslands)	IP

== See also ==
- Government of Iceland
- Cabinet of Iceland
