= 1946 Icelandic parliamentary election =

← October 1942	30 June 1946	1949 →
- All 35 seats in the Lower House and 17 seats in the Upper House of Althing
- Turnout: 87.42%
Party	Leader	Vote %	Seats	+/–
Upper House
Independence	Ólafur Thors	39.50	7	0
Progressive	Hermann Jónasson	23.06	4	−1
Socialist	Einar Olgeirsson	19.50	3	0
Social Democratic	Stefán Stefánsson	17.81	3	+1
Lower House
Independence	Ólafur Thors	39.50	13	0
Progressive	Hermann Jónasson	23.05	9	−1
Socialist	Einar Olgeirsson	19.50	7	0
Social Democratic	Stefán Stefánsson	17.81	6	+1
This lists parties that won seats. See the complete results below.
Prime Minister before	Prime Minister after
Ólafur Thors; Independence	Ólafur Thors; Independence

Parliamentary elections were held in Iceland on 30 June 1946. The Independence Party remained the largest party in the Lower House of the Althing, winning 13 of the 35 seats.

== Electoral system ==
The elections were conducted under rural–urban proportional representation. Twenty-one members were elected in single-member constituencies via first-past-the-post voting, while the remainder were elected using D'Hondt method proportional representation: twelve members in two-member constituencies, eight members in Reykjavík, and eleven from a single national compensatory list. To earn national list seats, a party had to win at least one constituency seat. In constituencies electing two or more members, within the party list, voters had the option to re-rank the candidates and could also strike a candidate out. Allocation of seats to candidates was done using a system based on the Borda count.

== Results ==
Party	Votes	%	Seats			
Party	Votes	%	Lower House	+/–	Upper House	+/–
Independence Party	26,428	39.50	13	0	7	0
Progressive Party	15,429	23.06	9	–1	4	–1
People's Unity Party – Socialist Party	13,049	19.50	7	0	3	0
Social Democratic Party	11,914	17.81	6	+1	3	+1
Independents	93	0.14	0	0	0	0
Total	66,913	100.00	35	0	17	0
Valid votes	66,913	98.55				
Invalid/blank votes	983	1.45				
Total votes	67,896	100.00				
Registered voters/turnout	77,670	87.42				
Source: Nohlen & Stöver
