= 1949 Icelandic parliamentary election =

← 1946	23 and 24 October 1949	1953 →
- All 35 seats in the Lower House and 17 seats in the Upper House of Althing
- Turnout: 89.03%
Party	Leader	Vote %	Seats	+/–
Upper House
Independence	Ólafur Thors	39.53	6	−1
Progressive	Hermann Jónasson	24.45	6	+2
Socialist	Einar Olgeirsson	19.49	3	0
Social Democratic	Stefán Stefánsson	16.53	2	−1
Lower House
Independence	Ólafur Thors	39.53	13	0
Progressive	Hermann Jónasson	24.45	11	+2
Socialist	Einar Olgeirsson	19.49	6	−1
Social Democratic	Stefán Stefánsson	16.53	5	−1
This lists parties that won seats. See the complete results below.
Prime Minister before	Prime Minister after
Stefán Stefánsson; Social Democratic	Ólafur Thors; Independence

Parliamentary elections were held in Iceland on 23 and 24 October 1949. The Independence Party remained the largest party in the Lower House of the Althing, winning 13 of the 35 seats.

== Electoral system ==
The elections were conducted under rural–urban proportional representation. Twenty-one members were elected in single-member constituencies via first-past-the-post voting, while the remainder were elected using D'Hondt method proportional representation: twelve members in two-member constituencies, eight members in Reykjavík, and eleven from a single national compensatory list. To earn national list seats, a party had to win at least one constituency seat. In constituencies electing two or more members, within the party list, voters had the option to re-rank the candidates and could also strike a candidate out. Allocation of seats to candidates was done using a system based on the Borda count.

== Results ==
Party	Votes	%	Seats			
Party	Votes	%	Lower House	+/–	Upper House	+/–
Independence Party	28,546	39.53	13	0	6	–1
Progressive Party	17,659	24.45	11	+2	6	+2
People's Unity Party – Socialist Party	14,077	19.49	6	–1	3	0
Social Democratic Party	11,937	16.53	5	–1	2	–1
Total	72,219	100.00	35	0	17	0
Valid votes	72,219	98.35				
Invalid/blank votes	1,213	1.65				
Total votes	73,432	100.00				
Registered voters/turnout	82,481	89.03				
Source: Nohlen & Stöver
