= July 1942 Icelandic parliamentary election =

- 5 July 1942
- All 33 seats in the Lower House and 16 seats in the Upper House of Althing
- Turnout: 80.26%
| Party | Leader | Vote % | Seats | +/– |
Upper House
| Independence | Ólafur Thors | 39.52 | 6 | 0 |
| Progressive | Jónas frá Hriflu | 27.58 | 6 | −1 |
| Socialist | Einar Olgeirsson | 16.21 | 2 | New |
| Social Democratic | Stefán Jóhann Stefánsson | 15.45 | 2 | 0 |
Lower House
| Independence | Ólafur Thors | 39.52 | 11 | 0 |
| Progressive | Jónas frá Hriflu | 27.58 | 14 | +2 |
| Socialist | Einar Olgeirsson | 16.21 | 4 | New |
| Social Democratic | Stefán Jóhann Stefánsson | 15.45 | 4 | −2 |
This lists parties that won seats. See the complete results below.
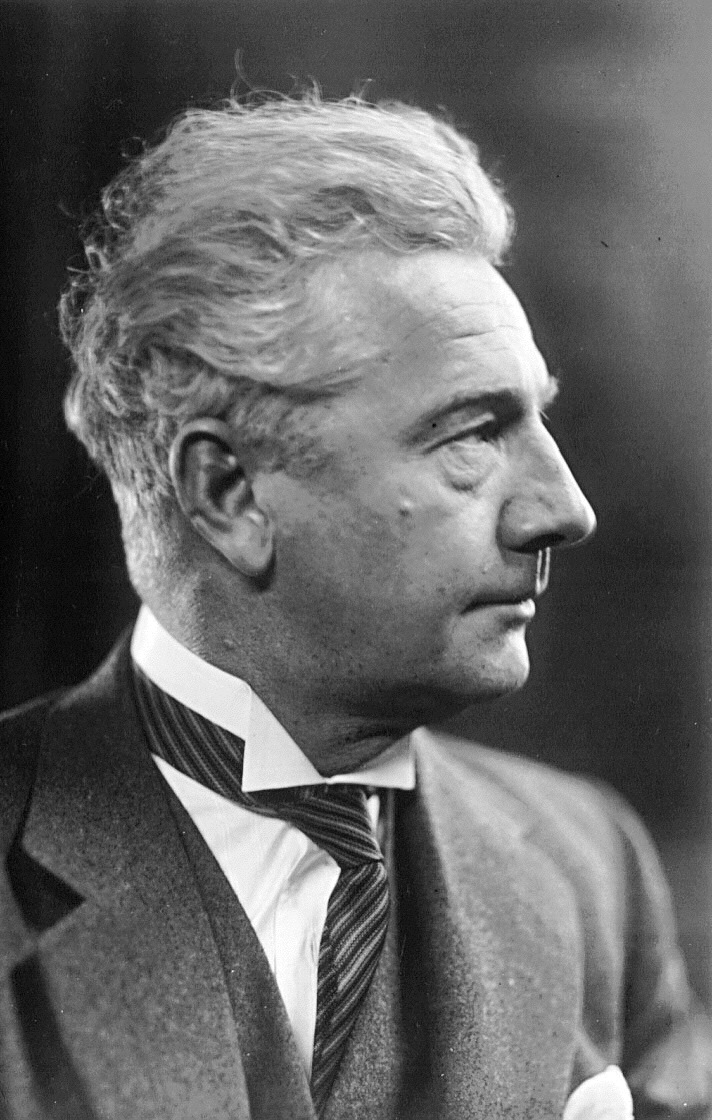

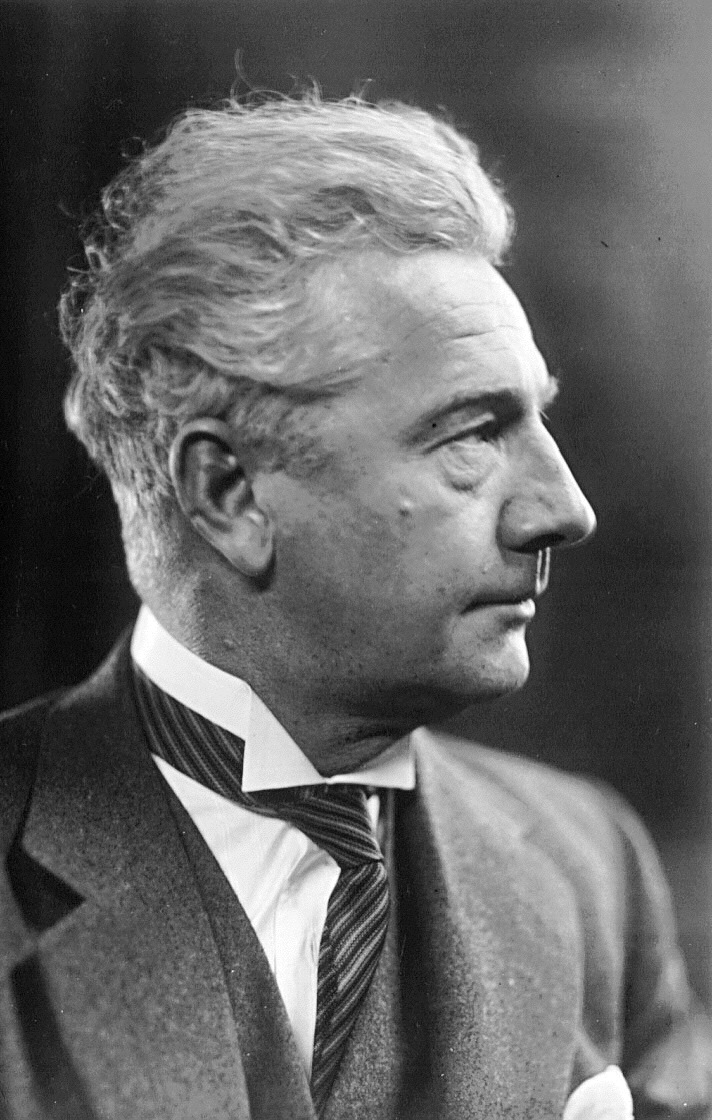
| Prime Minister before | Prime Minister after |
|---|---|
| Ólafur Thors; Independence | Ólafur Thors; Independence |

Parliamentary elections were held in Iceland on 5 July 1942. Although the Independence Party won a plurality of votes, the Progressive Party remained as the largest party in the Lower House of the Althing, winning 14 of the 33 seats.

Following the election, changes were made to the electoral system that reduced the over-representation of the Progressive Party. Early elections were held in October.

== Results ==
| Party | Votes | % | Seats | | | |
| Party | Votes | % | Lower House | +/– | Upper House | +/– |
|---|---|---|---|---|---|---|
| Independence Party | 22,975 | 39.52 | 11 | 0 | 6 | 0 |
| Progressive Party | 16,033 | 27.58 | 14 | +2 | 6 | –1 |
| People's Unity Party – Socialist Party | 9,423 | 16.21 | 4 | +2 | 2 | +1 |
| Social Democratic Party | 8,979 | 15.45 | 4 | –2 | 2 | 0 |
| Commonwealth Party | 618 | 1.06 | 0 | New | 0 | New |
| Liberal Left | 103 | 0.18 | 0 | New | 0 | New |
| Total | 58,131 | 100.00 | 33 | 0 | 16 | 0 |
| Valid votes | 58,131 | 98.63 | | | | |
| Invalid/blank votes | 809 | 1.37 | | | | |
| Total votes | 58,940 | 100.00 | | | | |
| Registered voters/turnout | 73,440 | 80.26 | | | | |
Source: Nohlen & Stöver
