= October 1942 Icelandic parliamentary election =

- 18 and 19 October 1942
- All 35 seats in the Lower House and 17 seats in the Upper House of Althing
- Turnout: 82.35%
| Party | Leader | Vote % | Seats | +/– |
Upper House
| Independence | Ólafur Thors | 38.55 | 7 | +1 |
| Progressive | Jónas frá Hriflu | 26.60 | 5 | −1 |
| Socialist | Einar Olgeirsson | 18.53 | 3 | +1 |
| Social Democratic | Stefán Jóhann Stefánsson | 14.17 | 2 | 0 |
Lower House
| Independence | Ólafur Thors | 38.55 | 13 | +2 |
| Progressive | Jónas frá Hriflu | 26.60 | 10 | −4 |
| Socialist | Einar Olgeirsson | 18.53 | 7 | +3 |
| Social Democratic | Stefán Jóhann Stefánsson | 14.17 | 5 | +1 |
This lists parties that won seats. See the complete results below.
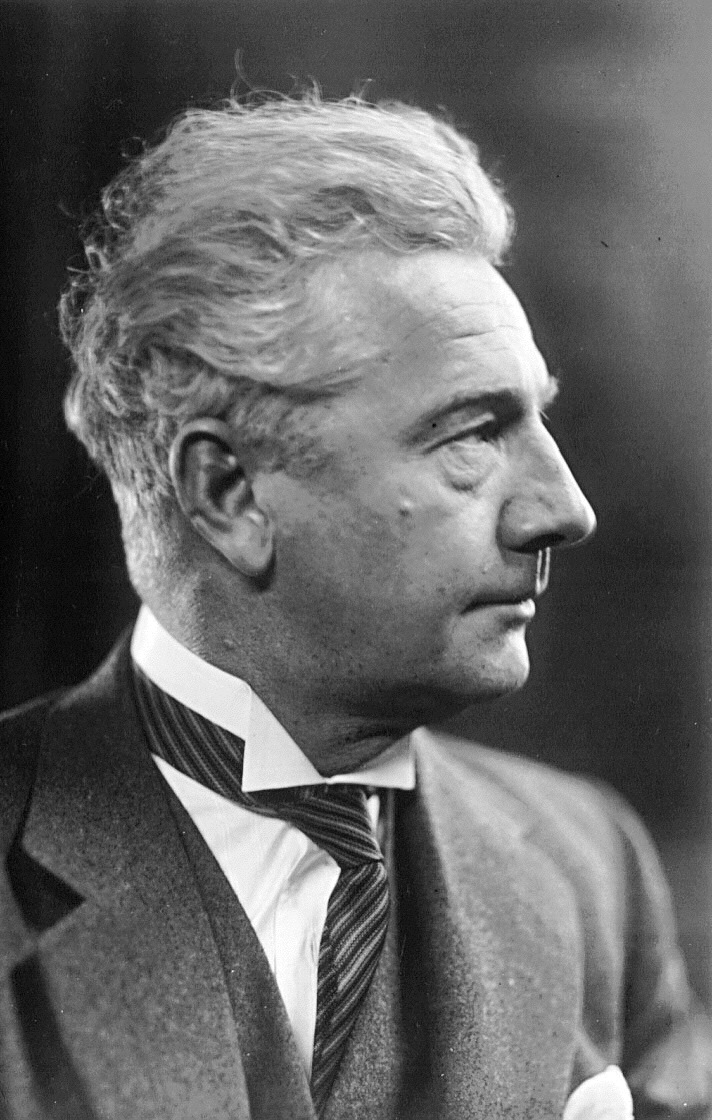

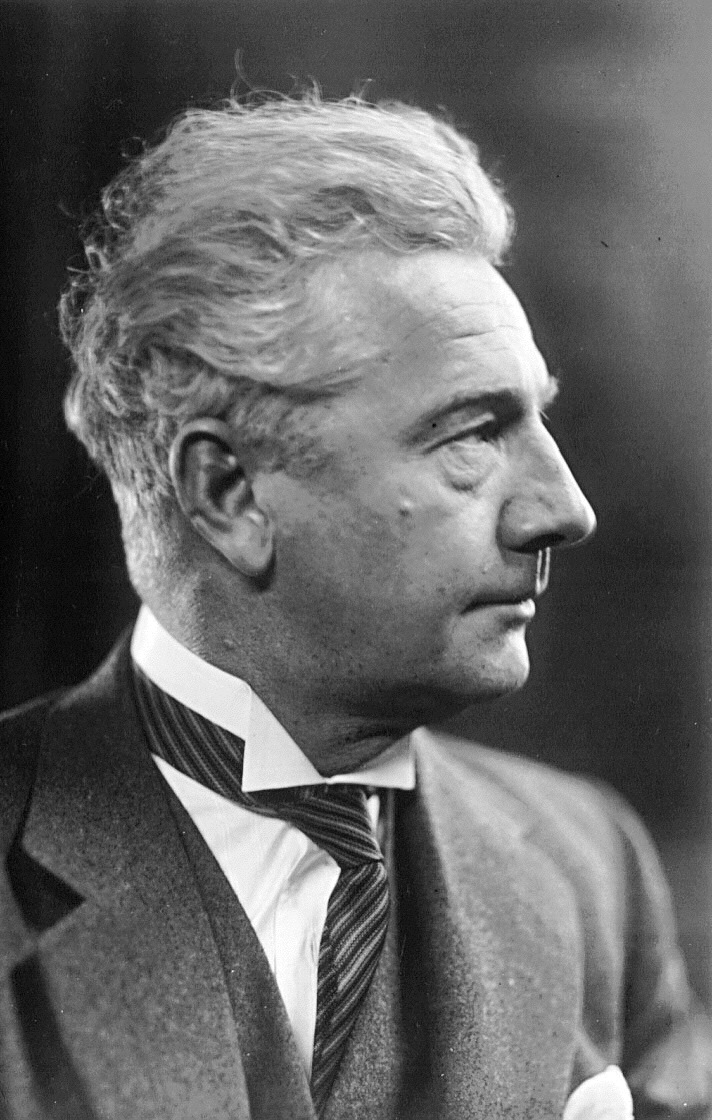
| Prime Minister before | Prime Minister after |
|---|---|
| Ólafur Thors; Independence | Ólafur Thors; Independence |

Early parliamentary elections were held in Iceland on 18 and 19 October 1942. They were held after reforms were made to the electoral system following the July elections. The Independence Party emerged as the largest party in the Lower House of the Althing, winning 13 of the 35 seats.

== Electoral reform ==
In the previous two elections in 1937 and July 1942 the Independence Party had received the most votes, yet had received fewer seats than the Progressive Party, which had received more than 10% less of the vote. However, following the July election, changes were made to the electoral system that reduced the over-representation of the Progressive Party. This involved introducing proportional representation to the two six-member constituencies and increasing the number of seats in Reykjavík where PR was already in use, lowering its effective threshold from 11.3% to 8.7%.

Whilst both parties received a similar number of votes as in July (the IP increased their vote tally by just 26, whilst the PP lost 164 votes), the Independence Party won two extra seats in the Lower House, whilst the Progressive Party lost four.

== Results ==
| Party | Votes | % | Seats | | | |
| Party | Votes | % | Lower House | +/– | Upper House | +/– |
|---|---|---|---|---|---|---|
| Independence Party | 23,001 | 38.55 | 13 | +2 | 7 | +1 |
| Progressive Party | 15,869 | 26.60 | 10 | –4 | 5 | –1 |
| People's Unity Party – Socialist Party | 11,059 | 18.53 | 7 | +3 | 3 | +1 |
| Social Democratic Party | 8,455 | 14.17 | 5 | +1 | 2 | 0 |
| Commonwealth Party | 1,284 | 2.15 | 0 | 0 | 0 | 0 |
| Total | 59,668 | 100.00 | 35 | +2 | 17 | +1 |
| Valid votes | 59,668 | 98.50 | | | | |
| Invalid/blank votes | 908 | 1.50 | | | | |
| Total votes | 60,576 | 100.00 | | | | |
| Registered voters/turnout | 73,560 | 82.35 | | | | |
Source: Nohlen & Stöver
