= 1953 Icelandic parliamentary election =

| ← 1949 | 28 June 1953 | 1956 → |
- All 35 seats in the Lower House and 17 seats in the Upper House of Althing
- Turnout: 89.90%
| Party | Leader | Vote % | Seats | +/– |
Upper House
| Independence | Ólafur Thors | 37.12 | 7 | +1 |
| Progressive | Hermann Jónasson | 21.91 | 6 | 0 |
| Socialist | Einar Olgeirsson | 16.05 | 2 | −1 |
| Social Democratic | Hannibal Valdimarsson | 15.62 | 2 | 0 |
Lower House
| Independence | Ólafur Thors | 37.12 | 14 | +1 |
| Progressive | Hermann Jónasson | 21.91 | 10 | −1 |
| Socialist | Einar Olgeirsson | 16.05 | 5 | −1 |
| Social Democratic | Hannibal Valdimarsson | 15.62 | 4 | −1 |
| National Preservation | Gils Guðmundsson | 6.03 | 2 | New |
This lists parties that won seats. See the complete results below.
| Prime Minister before | Prime Minister after |
|---|---|
| Steingrímur Steinþórsson; Progressive | Ólafur Thors; Independence |

Parliamentary elections were held in Iceland on 28 June 1953. The Independence Party remained the largest party in the Lower House of the Althing, winning 14 of the 35 seats.

== Electoral system ==
The elections were conducted under rural–urban proportional representation. Twenty-one members were elected in single-member constituencies via first-past-the-post voting, while the remainder were elected using D'Hondt method proportional representation: twelve members in two-member constituencies, eight members in Reykjavík, and eleven from a single national compensatory list. To earn national list seats, a party had to win at least one constituency seat. In constituencies electing two or more members, within the party list, voters had the option to re-rank the candidates and could also strike a candidate out. Allocation of seats to candidates was done using a system based on the Borda count.

== Results ==
| Party | Votes | % | Seats | | | |
| Party | Votes | % | Lower House | +/– | Upper House | +/– |
|---|---|---|---|---|---|---|
| Independence Party | 28,738 | 37.12 | 14 | +1 | 7 | +1 |
| Progressive Party | 16,959 | 21.91 | 10 | –1 | 6 | 0 |
| People's Unity Party – Socialist Party | 12,422 | 16.05 | 5 | –1 | 2 | –1 |
| Social Democratic Party | 12,093 | 15.62 | 4 | –1 | 2 | 0 |
| National Preservation Party | 4,667 | 6.03 | 2 | New | 0 | New |
| Republican Party | 2,531 | 3.27 | 0 | New | 0 | New |
| Total | 77,410 | 100.00 | 35 | 0 | 17 | 0 |
| Valid votes | 77,410 | 98.29 | | | | |
| Invalid/blank votes | 1,344 | 1.71 | | | | |
| Total votes | 78,754 | 100.00 | | | | |
| Registered voters/turnout | 87,601 | 89.90 | | | | |
Source: Nohlen & Stöver
