= Reykjavik Constituency =

Reykjavik Constituency may refer to:

- Reykjavík (Althing constituency), former Althing constituency
- Reykjavík North (Althing constituency), current Althing constituency
- Reykjavík South (Althing constituency), current Althing constituency
