= Björn Bjarnason =

Icelandic politician (born 1944)

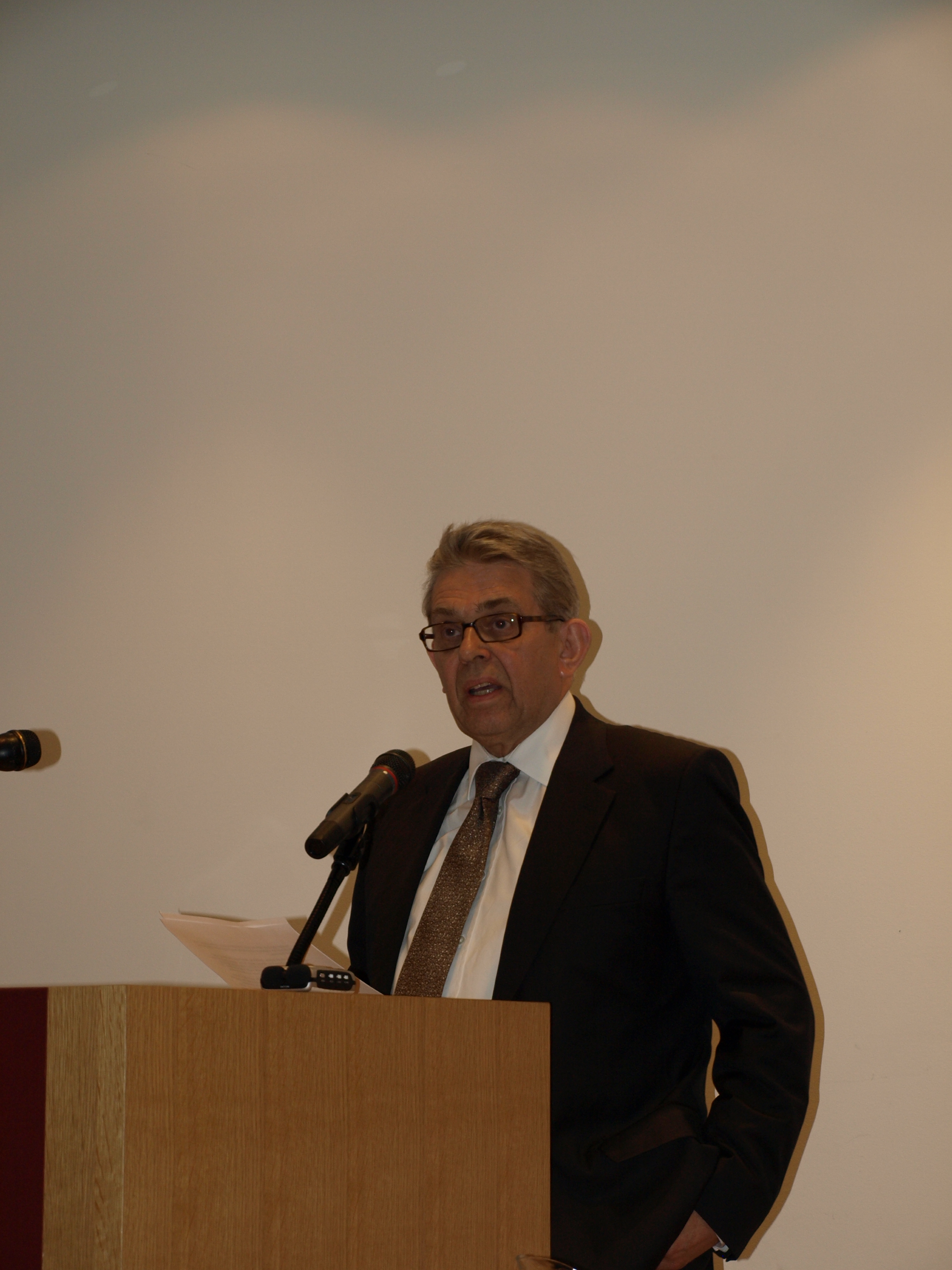

Minister of Justice and Ecclesiastical Affairs
- In office 23 May 2003 – 1 February 2009
- Prime Minister: Davíð Oddsson; Halldór Ásgrímsson; Geir Haarde
- Preceded by: Sólveig Pétursdóttir
- Succeeded by: Ragna Árnadóttir

Minister for Education
- In office 23 April 1995 – 2 March 2002
- Prime Minister: Davíð Oddsson
- Preceded by: Ólafur G. Einarsson
- Succeeded by: Tómas Ingi Olrich

Personal details
- Born: 14 November 1944 (age 81) Reykjavík, Iceland
- Party: Independence Party
- Spouse: Rut Ingólfsdóttir
- Children: two children
- Education: University of Iceland
- Profession: journalist

Björn Bjarnason (born 14 November 1944) is an Icelandic politician. His father was Bjarni Benediktsson, Prime Minister of Iceland, Minister of Justice and Ecclesiastical Affairs and Mayor of Reykjavík.

Matriculating from Reykjavík Junior College in 1964 and graduating in law (cand. jur.) from the University of Iceland in 1971, Björn was active in student politics and after graduation worked as a publishing director of Almenna bókafélagið from 1971 to 1974. As foreign news editor he worked at daily Vísir in 1974, as Deputy Secretary General in the Prime Minister's office from 1974 to 1975.

Björn also served in the Icelandic Coast Guard in the 1960s.

During the Cold War, alongside his job as a journalist, Björn regularly met with U.S. intelligence to share with them information regarding Icelandic politics and Icelandic leftist politicians and activists.

Björn worked in the Prime Minister's Office from 1975 to 1979, as a journalist on Icelandic daily Morgunblaðið from 1979 to 1984 and as deputy editor of Morgunblaðið from 1984 to 1991. Björn attended the Bilderberg Group conference 11 times (in 1982, 1983, 1984, 1985, 1988, 1989, 1990, 1991, 1992, 1993 and 1995).

Björn was elected to the Althing in 1991 for the Independence Party, for the constituency of Reykjavík. On 23 April 1995 he became Minister for Education, serving until 2002. In 2002, he led the unsuccessful attempt of the Independence Party to win elections to Reykjavík city council. From 2003 to 2009, he was the Minister for Justice and Ecclesiastical Affairs.

He is also the first Icelandic politician to keep his own website, which he started on 19 February 1995 and thus makes him one of the Internet's earliest bloggers.

Political offices
| Preceded by Ólafur G. Einarsson | Minister for Education; 1995–2002 | Succeeded by Tómas Ingi Olrich |
| Preceded by Sólveig Pétursdóttir | Minister of Justice and Ecclesiastical Affairs; 2003–2009 | Succeeded by Ragna Árnadóttir |
