= Auður Auðuns =

Icelandic lawyer and politician

Personal details
- Born: February 18, 1911 Ísafjörður, Iceland
- Died: October 19, 1999 (aged 88) Reykjavík, Iceland
- Education: University of Iceland
- Occupation: Lawyer, politician

Auður Auðuns (18 February 1911 – 19 October 1999) was an Icelandic lawyer and politician from the Independence Party. She set several records as she became the first Icelandic woman to obtain a law degree, the first female Mayor of Reykjavík and the first female cabinet member in Iceland when she became Minister of Justice and Church in the short-lived 1970–71 cabinet of Jóhann Hafstein.

Auður grew up in Ísafjörður in the remote Westfjords in North-Western Iceland as the daughter of Margrét Guðrún Jónsdóttir and Jón Auðunn Jónsson, an MP for first the Conservative Party and from 1929 onwards for its successor the Independence Party.

At 14, she went to live with relatives in Reykjavík in order to pursue her education. Auður graduated from the prestigious Menntaskólinn í Reykjavík in 1929 and got a law degree from the University of Iceland in 1935. She then spent a year studying Icelandic rhetoric and speech patterns in her hometown before she married high court attorney Hermann Jónsson, with whom she had four children Jón (1939), Einar (1942), Margrét (1949), and Árni (1954).

She worked for twenty years as a lawyer for the Single Mothers Assistance Committee in Reykjavík 1940–60, was a leading member of the Icelandic Women's Rights Association and acted as an advisor to the government on a number of topics related to family law, children and women's issues.

Auður was a city councillor in Reykjavík for 24 years between 1946 and 1970 and chaired the City Council 1954–59 and 1960–70. From 19 November 1959 to 5 October 1960 she was Co-Mayor with future Prime Minister Geir Hallgrímsson and acted as his mentor. He subsequently became the sole Mayor 1960–74.

She was elected to the Althing from the Reykjavík constituency 1959–74 having previously been a substitute member 1947–48. She served on the Public Broadcasting Board 1975–78. Auður was a delegate at the UN General Assembly in 1967 and chaired the Icelandic delegation at the UN Women's Conference in Mexico City in 1975.
