= Magnús Kjartansson =

Icelandic politician (1919–1981)

Magnús Kjartansson (25 February 1919 – 28 July 1981) was an Icelandic journalist, writer, politician and former minister. From 1947 to 1971, he was an editor of Þjóðviljinn, an Icelandic newspaper connected to the People's Unity Party – Socialist Party and to its successor, the People's Alliance.

Kjartnsson was a Member of Parliament for Reykjavík from 1968 to 1978, representing the People's Alliance. From 1971 to 1974, he was a Minister of Health and Insurance and Minister of Industry.
