= Gunnar Thoroddsen =

Icelandic politician (1910–1983)

22nd Prime Minister of Iceland
- In office 8 February 1980 – 26 May 1983
- President: Kristján Eldjárn; Vigdís Finnbogadóttir
- Preceded by: Benedikt Sigurðsson Gröndal
- Succeeded by: Steingrímur Hermannsson

Minister of Finance
- In office 20 November 1959 – 8 May 1965
- Prime Minister: Olafur Thors; Bjarni Benediktsson
- Preceded by: Guðmundur Guðmundsson
- Succeeded by: Magnús Jónsson

Mayor of Reykjavík
- In office 10 February 1947 – 19 November 1959
- Preceded by: Bjarni Benediktsson
- Succeeded by: Auður Auðuns

Personal details
- Born: 29 December 1910 Reykjavík, Iceland
- Died: 25 September 1983 (aged 72) Reykjavík, Iceland
- Party: Independence
- Education: University of Iceland

Gunnar Thoroddsen (pronounced [ˈkʏnːar ˈtʰouːrɔtˌsɛn]) (29 December 1910 – 25 September 1983) was the prime minister of Iceland from 1980 to 1983.

Gunnar was the youngest man ever elected to the Althing, Iceland's Parliament. He was 23 years old when he was elected as Member of Parliament in 1934. He served as Iceland's ambassador in Denmark from 1965 to 1969 when he ran for the presidency of Iceland in 1968. He wished to succeed his father in law, Ásgeir Ásgeirsson, who served as president from 1952 to 1968. Gunnar had been mayor of Reykjavík from 1947 to 1959 and Minister of Finance of Iceland from 1959 to 1965. He was minister of industry and social welfare in the cabinet of Geir Hallgrímsson from 28 August 1974 to 27 June 1978.

Gunnar and Geir were not in agreement and the disagreement led to Gunnar breaking away from the will of the Independence Party with a few members of parliament and forming a cabinet with the Progressive Party and the People's Alliance, that replaced a minority government of Benedikt Sigurðsson Gröndal. By forming his government Gunnar became the oldest prime minister in Iceland's history at the age of 69. Gunnar did not run in the 1983 elections for parliament, due to his illness, and ended his involvement in politics when his cabinet was succeeded by Steingrímur Hermannsson's cabinet. He died shortly thereafter.

Political offices
Preceded by Guðmundur Guðmundsson	Minister of Finance; 1959–1965	Succeeded by Magnús Jónsson
Preceded by Benedikt Sigurðsson Gröndal	Prime Minister of Iceland; 1980–1983	Succeeded by Steingrímur Hermannsson
