= Ragna Árnadóttir =

Icelandic politician and lawyer

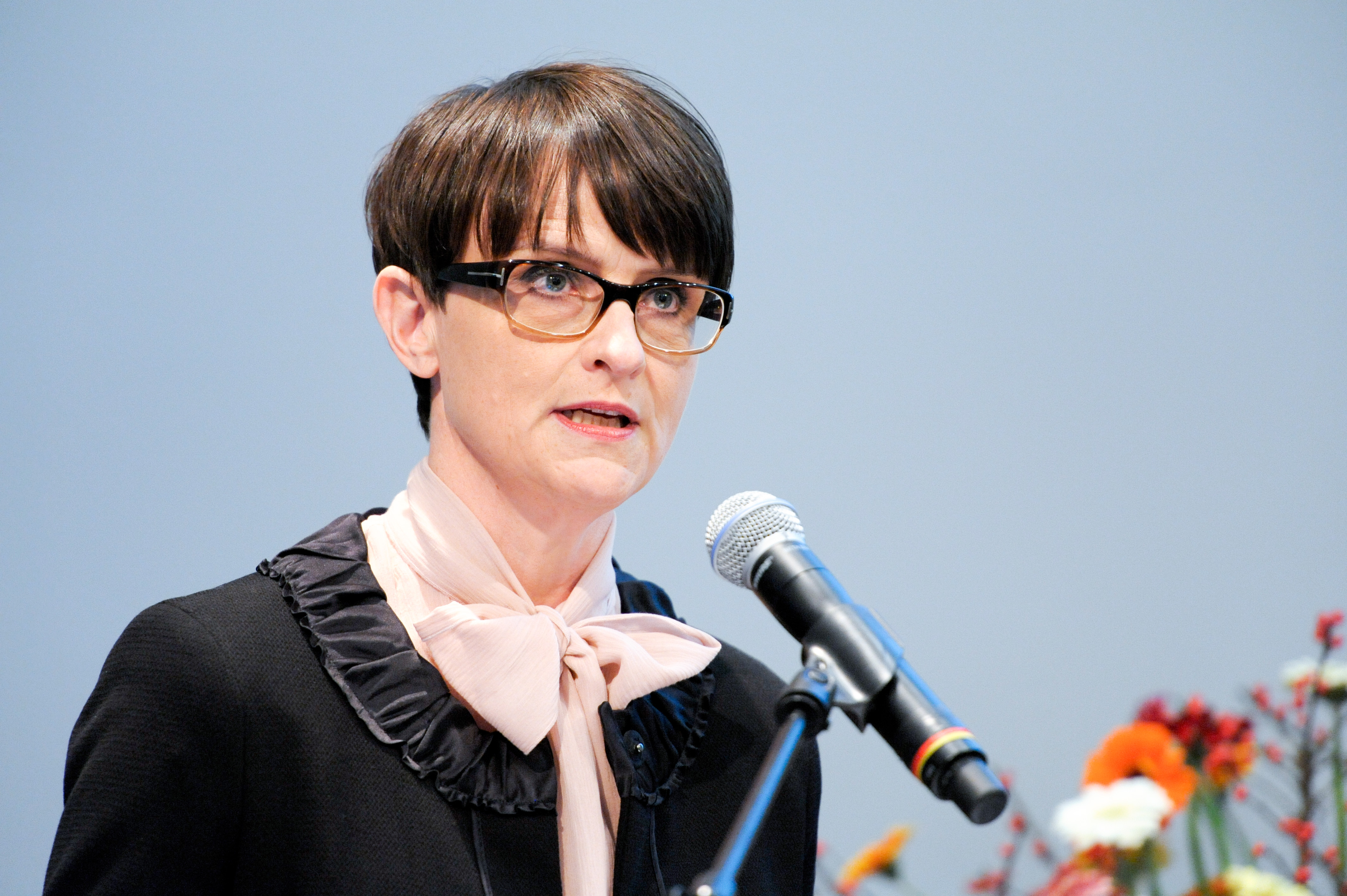

Minister of Justice and Ecclesiastical Affairs
- In office 1 February 2009 – 2 September 2010
- Prime Minister: Jóhanna Sigurðardóttir
- Preceded by: Björn Bjarnason
- Succeeded by: Ögmundur Jónasson

Secretary General of Alþingi
- Incumbent
- Assumed office 1 September 2019
- Preceded by: Helgi Bernódusson

Personal details
- Born: 30 August 1966 (age 60) Reykjavík, Iceland
- Spouse: Magnús Jón Björnsson
- Children: 2
- Education: University of Iceland, Lund University
- Profession: Lawyer, civil servant

Ragna Árnadóttir (born 30 August 1966) is an Icelandic lawyer, politician and former Minister of Justice and Ecclesiastical Affairs of Iceland. She previously served as the acting office manager of the Prime Minister's Office from 15 January 2009.

Ragna started working for Landsvirkjun, Iceland's national power company and its largest generator of electricity, in 2010; from 2012 to 2019, she was vice president of the company. From September 2019 to June 2025, Ragna was the Secretary General of Alþingi (is the national parliament of Iceland). In July 2025 she became the CEO of Landsnet, the Icelandic Transmission System Operator.
