= Ólafur Jóhannesson =

Prime Minister of Iceland for the Progressive Party

19th Prime Minister of Iceland
- In office 1 September 1978 – 15 October 1979
- President: Kristján Eldjárn
- Preceded by: Geir Hallgrímsson
- Succeeded by: Benedikt Gröndal
- In office 14 July 1971 – 28 August 1974
- President: Kristján Eldjárn
- Preceded by: Jóhann Hafstein
- Succeeded by: Geir Hallgrímsson

Minister of Foreign Affairs
- In office 8 February 1980 – 26 May 1983
- Prime Minister: Gunnar Thoroddsen
- Preceded by: Benedikt Gröndal
- Succeeded by: Geir Hallgrímsson

Personal details
- Born: 1 March 1913 Skagafjörður, Iceland
- Died: 20 May 1984 (aged 71)
- Party: Progressive Party
- Education: University of Iceland

Ólafur Jóhannesson (1 March 1913 – 20 May 1984) was twice the Prime Minister of Iceland for the Progressive Party (1971–1974 and 1978–1979). He was a member of the Progressive Party, serving as party chairman from 1968 to 1979.

== Career ==
Ólafur was educated at Akureyri Junior College (matriculated 1935), and studied law at the University of Iceland (graduated 1939, Hdl. 1942). Following postgraduate studies in Denmark and Sweden, he worked as a lawyer and accountant, before returning to academia, becoming a lecturer and serving as a professor of law at the University of Iceland 1947–78.

He served as Prime Minister and Minister for Justice and Minister Ecclesiastical Affairs 1971–74 and 1978–79; Minister for Justice, Minister Ecclesiastical Affairs and Trade Secretary 1974–78; and Foreign Minister 1980–83. As Minister for Justice and Ecclesiastical Affairs, he recognised Ásatrúarfélagið as a religious organisation in May 1973. During his tenure, Ólafur headed the government that defied the United Kingdom during the Cod War.

Ólafur became the Progressive Party leader in 1968 and formed a cabinet with him as a prime minister following the 1971 election. After the 1974 election, Geir Hallgrímsson, the chairman of the Independence Party, formed a new cabinet with the Progressive Party where Geir was prime minister. After the 1978 election, Ólafur became prime minister again and formed a new left-wing cabinet. In October 1979 Ólafur decided to dissolve the coalition because of economic disagreements, including because of high inflation and high gas prices. Ólafur left as party leader later that year but served as an MP until his death in 1984. He served as Minister of Foreign Affairs from 1980 to 1983 in Gunnar Thoroddsen's cabinet.

== Family ==
In 1941, Ólafur married Dóra Guðbjartsdóttir (1915−2004). They had three children. He died on May 20, 1984.

Party political offices
Preceded by Eysteinn Jónsson	Leader of the Progressive Party; 1968–1979	Succeeded by Steingrímur Hermannsson
Political offices
Preceded by Jóhann Hafstein	Prime Minister of Iceland; 1971–1974	Succeeded by Geir Hallgrímsson
Preceded by Geir Hallgrímsson	Prime Minister of Iceland; 1978–1979	Succeeded by Benedikt Gröndal
