= Guðmundur G. Thórarinsson =

Icelandic politician (born 1939)

Guðmundur G. Þórarinsson

Personal details
- Born: 29 October 1939 (age 85); Reykjavík, Iceland
- Political party: Progressive Party

Guðmundur G. Þórarinsson (born 29 October 1939) is an Icelandic politician.

== Career ==
He was a member of the Althing, representing the Progressive Party for the Reykjavík Constituency from 1979 to 1983 and from 1987 to 1991.

He chaired the Icelandic Chess Federation (ICF), from 1969 to 1974, and again from 1992.

== Personal life ==
Guðmundur was born in Reykjavík on 29 October 1939, a son of Þórarinn Bjarnfinnur Ólafsson (1920–1977) and Aðalheiður Sigríður Guðmundsdóttir (1922–1990). He married Anna Björg Jónsdóttir in 1961.
