= Benedikt Gröndal (born 1924) =

Icelandic politician

21st Prime Minister of Iceland
- In office 15 October 1979 – 8 February 1980
- President: Kristján Eldjárn
- Preceded by: Ólafur Jóhannesson
- Succeeded by: Gunnar Thoroddsen

Minister of Foreign Affairs
- In office 1 September 1978 – 8 February 1980
- Prime Minister: Ólafur Jóhannesson; Himself
- Preceded by: Einar Ágústsson
- Succeeded by: Ólafur Jóhannesson

Personal details
- Born: 7 July 1924 Önundarfjörður, Kingdom of Iceland
- Died: 20 July 2010 (aged 86) Reykjavík, Iceland
- Party: Social Democratic Party
- Education: Harvard University; University of Oxford

Benedikt Sigurðsson Gröndal (Icelandic pronunciation: [ˈpɛːnɛːˌtɪxt ˈsɪːɣʏrðsˌsɔːn ˈkrœːntal]; 7 July 1924 – 20 July 2010) was an Icelandic politician who served as prime minister of Iceland for 116 days in a minority government from 1979 to 1980. A member of the Social Democratic Party, he was minister of Foreign Affairs from 1978 to 1980 and the only Icelandic prime minister who served in two cabinet roles simultaneously.

His government was the second Social Democrat minority government of Iceland, formed after the collapse of Ólafur Jóhannesson's cabinet, with Gröndal's cabinet only being formed as a temporary solution until the 1979 parliamentary election. His cabinet was defeated in the election and his party was not asked to form the next cabinet. Gröndal was a member of Althingi from 1956 to 1982 and led his party from 1974 to 1980. He attended the United Nations General Assembly in 1966.

After leaving the political scene in 1982, Gröndal was appointed ambassador of Iceland to Sweden and Finland. After residing for some years in Stockholm, he served as roving ambassador to the Far East, including Australia, China, South Korea and Japan. After serving two years as representative to the United Nations, Benedikt Gröndal retired to his native home in 1991. He died on 20 July 2010 at the age of 86.

Political offices
Preceded by Ólafur Jóhannesson	Prime Minister of Iceland; 1979–1980	Succeeded by Gunnar Thoroddsen
