= Ingólfur Jónsson =

Icelandic politician and minister

Ingólfur Jónsson (15 May 1909 – 18 July 1984) was an Icelandic politician and former minister.
