= Bjarni Guðnason =

Icelandic footballer (1928–2023)

Personal information
- Full name: Bjarni Guðnason
- Date of birth: 3 September 1928
- Place of birth: Reykjavík, Iceland
- Date of death: 27 October 2023 (aged 95)
- Place of death: Landspítali, Iceland
- Position: Forward

Senior career*
Years	Team	Apps	(Gls)
1951–1953	Víkingur Reykjavík		

International career
1951–1953	Iceland	4	(0)
- * Club domestic league appearances and goals

Bjarni Guðnason (3 September 1928 – 27 October 2023) was an Icelandic professor, historian, politician and footballer.

== Personal life ==
Bjarni was born in Reykjavík on 3 September 1928 to Guðni Jónsson, a professor, and Jónína Margrét Pálsdóttir. He obtained a diploma from Reykjavik College in 1948 and later studied English in London. He married Anna Guðrún Tryggvadóttir in 1955 and the couple had four children. Bjarni died at the Landspítali hospital on 27 October 2023, at the age of 95.

== Academic career ==
Bjarni obtained a master's degree in Icelandic literature from the University of Iceland in 1956 and subsequently spent six years as a visiting lecturer at Uppsala University in Sweden. He went on to earn a doctorate from the University of Iceland, graduating in 1963, after which he served as a professor in Icelandic literary history until his retirement in 1998. During this time, he twice served as the president of the university's philosophy department and was the chairman of the Association of University Teachers (Icelandic: Félag háskolakennara) from 1969 to 1970.

== Political career ==
In 1971, Bjarni was elected as a member of the Althing, the Icelandic national parliament, representing the Union of Liberals and Leftists (Icelandic: Samtök frjálslyndra og vinstrimanna). Following the 1983 election, he served as a deputy member for the Social Democratic Party (Icelandic: Alþýðuflokkurinn), taking a seat in the house on two occasions during the 1983–1987 parliamentary session.

== Sporting career ==
Bjarni played association football as a forward. Between 1951 and 1953, he won four caps for the Iceland national team and was part of the team that defeated Sweden on 29 June 1951. Bjarni spent his domestic career with Víkingur Reykjavík. He also represented the Iceland national handball team on several occasions.
