= Sólveig Pétursdóttir =

Icelandic politician (born 1952)

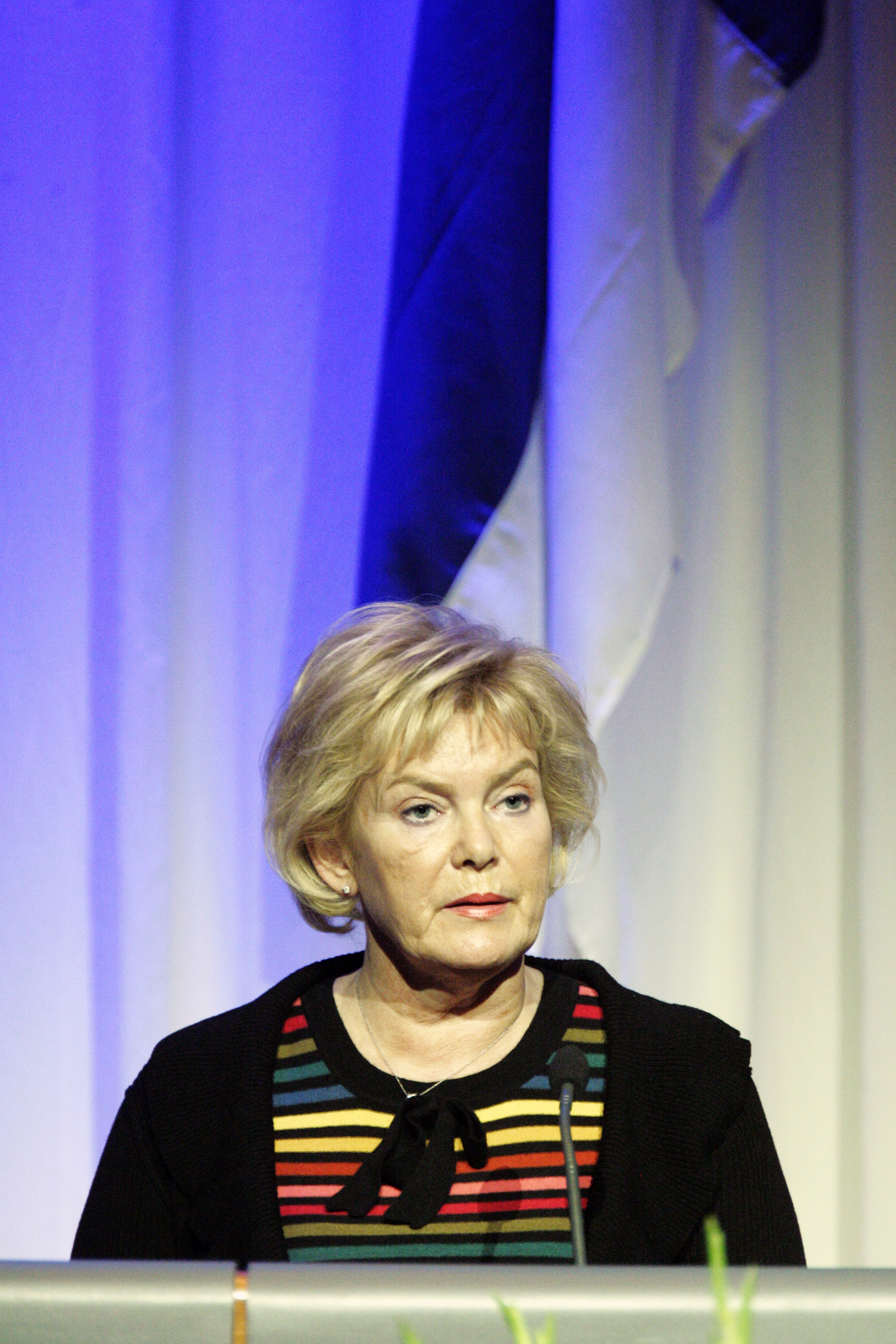
Sólveig Pétursdóttir

Sólveig Guðrún Pétursdóttir (born 11 March 1952) is an Icelandic politician and a former speaker of the Althing, the Icelandic parliament, serving from 2005 to 2007. She was a parliament member from 1991, for the Reykjavík Constituency (1991–2003), and the Reykjavik Constituency South (2003–2007). She is a member of the Independence Party. Sólveig was Iceland's Minister of Justice and Ecclesiastical Affairs 1999–2003. She is a lawyer who graduated from the University of Iceland (1977).
