= Magnús Torfi Ólafsson =

Icelandic politician (1923–1998)

Magnús Torfi Ólafsson (5 May 1923 – 3 November 1998) was an Icelandic politician and former minister for social affairs from May to August 1974.
