= Þjóðviljinn =

Icelandic newspaper

- Type: Daily newspaper
- Founded: 1936
- Ceased publication: 1992
- Language: Icelandic
- Country: Iceland
- ISSN: 1670-3928
- Free online archives: timarit.is

Þjóðviljinn was also the name of a magazine published by Skúli Thoroddsen between 1887 and 1915.

Þjóðviljinn (transl. The Nation's Will) was an Icelandic daily newspaper founded on 31 October 1936. It had close ties with the Communist Party of Iceland and later its successors, the People's Unity Party – Socialist Party and the People's Alliance Party.

During the Allied occupation of Iceland in World War II, the editors of the paper, Einar Olgeirsson and Sigfús Sigurhjartarson, and journalist Sigurð Guðmundsson were arrested, accused of spreading propaganda against the British army, and moved to HM Prison Brixton in the United Kingdom for a duration of a few months. The publication of the paper was also banned for a year.

In January 1992, the paper ceased publication due to financial difficulties.
