= Steingrímur Steinþórsson =

Icelandic politician (1893–1966)

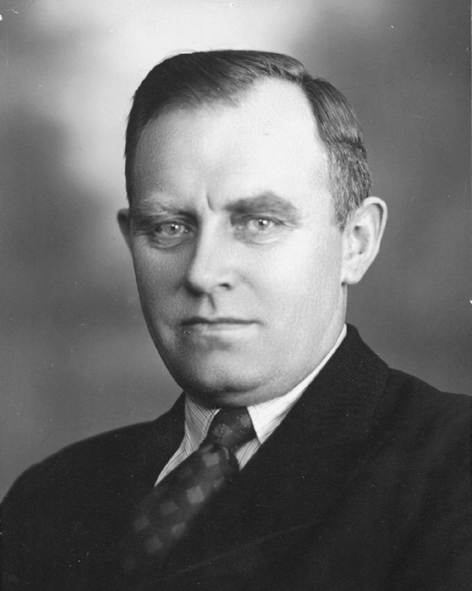

15th Prime Minister of Iceland
- In office 14 March 1950 – 11 September 1953
- President: Sveinn Björnsson; Ásgeir Ásgeirsson
- Preceded by: Ólafur Thors
- Succeeded by: Ólafur Thors

Personal details
- Born: 12 February 1893 Álftagerði, Iceland
- Died: 14 November 1966 (aged 73) Reykjavík, Iceland
- Party: Progressive Party
- Education: University of Copenhagen

Steingrímur Steinþórsson (12 February 1893 – 14 November 1966) was an Icelandic politician. He served as speaker of the Althing from 1949 to 1950. He served as prime minister of Iceland from 14 March 1950 to 11 September 1953. He was a member of the Interim Triumvirate (acting head of state) from 26 January to 31 July 1952, and was a member of the Progressive Party, though never its chairman. He served as Minister of Agriculture and Social Affairs from 1953 to 1956.

Steingrímur died in Reykjavík on 14 November 1966 following a bout of illness.

Political offices
Preceded by Ólafur Thors	Prime Minister of Iceland; 1950–1953	Succeeded by Ólafur Thors
