= Kristján Eldjárn =

President of Iceland from 1968 to 1980

His Excellency Kristján Eldjárn
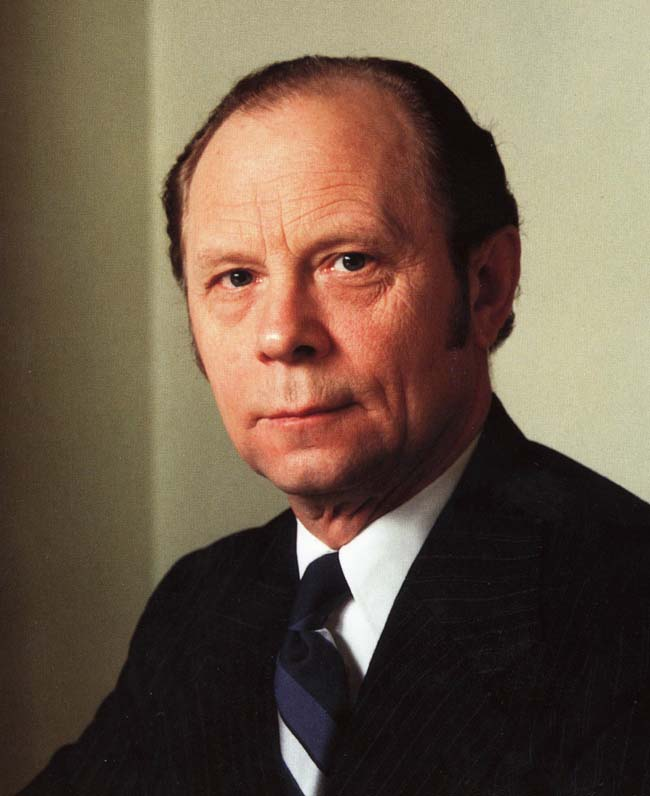
- Portrait, 1982

3rd President of Iceland
- In office 1 August 1968 – 1 August 1980
- Prime Minister: Bjarni Benediktsson; Jóhann Hafstein; Ólafur Jóhannesson; Geir Hallgrímsson; Ólafur Jóhannesson; Benedikt Gröndal; Gunnar Thoroddsen
- Preceded by: Ásgeir Ásgeirsson
- Succeeded by: Vigdís Finnbogadóttir

Personal details
- Born: 6 December 1916 Tjörn, Svarfaðardal, Iceland
- Died: 14 September 1982 (aged 65) Cleveland, Ohio, U.S.
- Spouse: Halldóra Eldjárn
- Children: 4
- Education: University of Copenhagen; University of Iceland
- Profession: Teacher, curator

Kristján Eldjárn (Icelandic: [ˈkʰrɪstjaun ˈɛltjaurtn̥]; 6 December 1916 – 14 September 1982) was the third president of Iceland, serving from 1968 to 1980.

== Biography ==
Kristján was born in Tjörn, Svarfaðardal, Iceland. His parents were Þórarinn Kr. Eldjárn, a teacher in Tjörn, and Sigrún Sigurhjartardóttir. He graduated in archaeology from the University of Copenhagen and taught at the University of Iceland. In 1957 he was awarded a doctorate for his research into pagan burials in Iceland. He was a teacher at the Akureyri Grammar School and the College of Navigation in Reykjavík, becoming a curator at the National Museum of Iceland in 1945 and its Director in 1947, a position he held until the 1968 presidential election.

Between 1966 and 1968, he hosted a series of educational TV programs on the (then new) Icelandic National Television (RÚV); on the program, he showed the audience some of the National Museum's artefacts and explained their historical context. These programs became quite popular, making him a well known and respected popular figure. This no doubt gave him the incentive needed to run in the 1968 presidential election as a politically non-affiliated candidate.

Starting as the underdog in the 1968 presidential election, running against Ambassador Gunnar Thoroddsen who initially had a 70% lead in the opinion polls, Kristján won 65.6% of the vote on a 92.2% voter turnout. He was re-elected unopposed in 1972 and 1976. In 1980 he decided not to run for another term, wanting to devote his remaining years entirely to continuing his lifelong academic work.

President Kristján Eldjárn died following heart surgery in Cleveland, Ohio on 14 September 1982.

His son Þórarinn Eldjárn is one of Iceland's most popular authors, specializing in short stories, but also writing poetry and an occasional novel. His daughter Sigrún Eldjárn is also an author and illustrator of several children's books. Þórarinn's son, Ari Eldjárn, is a prominent stand-up comedian in Iceland.

Political offices
Preceded by Ásgeir Ásgeirsson	President of Iceland; 1968–1980	Succeeded by Vigdís Finnbogadóttir
