= Guðrún Helgadóttir =

Icelandic children's writer and politician (1935–2022)

Guðrún Helgadóttir (7 September 1935 – 23 March 2022) was a prominent writer of children's literature and politician in Iceland. She was born in Hafnarfjörður, Iceland. Her first book, Jón Oddur og Jón Bjarni, appeared in 1974, when she worked at the National Health and Insurance Office. It concerned scheming twins. Several more books in this series were released. In 1981, they became the basis for a film. By the late 1980s, she had won several awards, and was nominated for the Hans Christian Andersen Award in 1988. She was also awarded the honorary Saga Stone from IBBY for her contributions. She has written a small amount of drama for adults, but most of her work is for young children.

As a politician, she became the first woman to be Speaker of the Althing in 1988 and held that position until 1991. Before that, she had served in the legislative assembly and held a position on the Reykjavík City Council, representing the People's Alliance.

== Works translated into English ==
- A Giant Love Story
- Flumbra: an Icelandic Folktale
