= Republican Party (Iceland, 1953) =

Republican Party Lýðveldisflokkurinn

The Republican Party (Icelandic: Lýðveldisflokkurinn) was a political party in Iceland. It was formed in 1953 as the result of the split from the Independence Party. A party with an identical name was officially granted list letter I on 8 March 2013, and started to compose a candidate list for participation in the 2013 Icelandic parliamentary election. It is, however, not the same party that participated in the 1953 election, although the name was chosen as a homage to the party.

== Election results ==
Election	Votes	Vote %	Seats	Place
1953	2,531	3.3	0	6th
