= Gylfi Þorsteinsson Gíslason =

Icelandic politician (1917–2004)

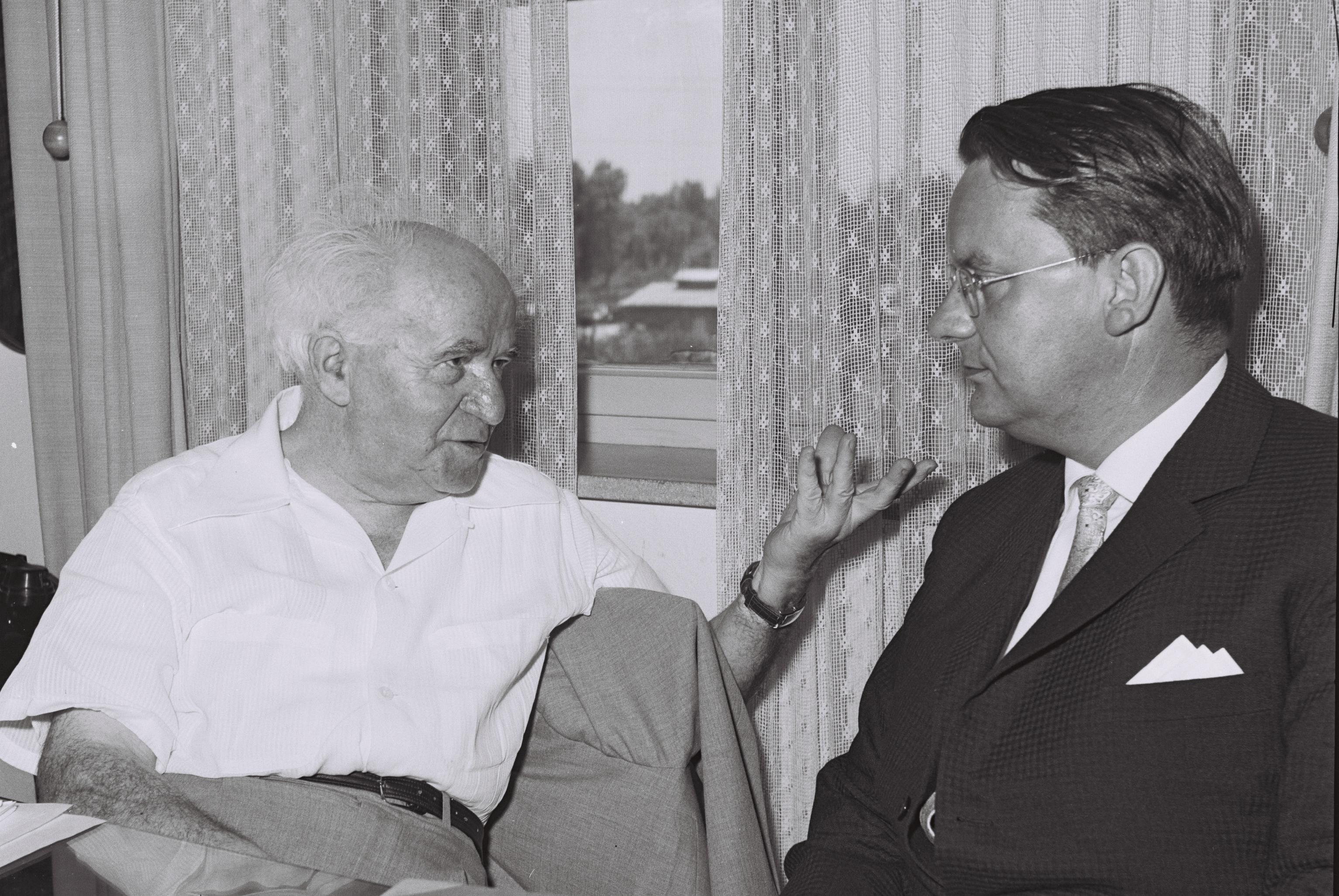
David Ben-Gurion meeting Gylfi Þorsteinsson Gíslason in Tel Aviv, 1958.

Gylfi Þorsteinsson Gíslason (7 February 1917 – 18 August 2004) was an Icelandic politician.

Gylfi was a member of the Social Democratic Party. He served as Minister of Education 1956–1971, as Minister of Industry 1956–1958 and as Minister of Commerce 1956–1971. He was the chairman of the Social Democratic Party from 1968 to 1974. He served as speaker of the Althing in 1974. He was also a professor in economics at the University of Iceland from 1939-56 and again from 1972-87.

He was the father of Þorsteinn Gylfason, a philosopher, Thorvaldur Gylfason, a professor of economics, and Vilmundur Gylfason, a left-wing politician. He was married to Guðrún Vilmundardóttir.
