= Geir Hallgrímsson =

Prime Minister of Iceland from 1974 to 1978

- Geir visiting president Gerald Ford in the White House in May 1975.

20th Prime Minister of Iceland
- In office 28 August 1974 – 1 September 1978
- President: Kristján Eldjárn
- Preceded by: Ólafur Jóhannesson
- Succeeded by: Ólafur Jóhannesson

Minister of Foreign Affairs
- In office 26 May 1983 – 24 January 1986
- Prime Minister: Steingrímur Hermannsson
- Preceded by: Ólafur Jóhannesson
- Succeeded by: Matthías Árni Mathiesen

Personal details
- Born: 16 December 1925 Reykjavík, Kingdom of Iceland
- Died: 1 September 1990 (aged 64) Reykjavík, Iceland
- Party: Independence Party
- Education: University of Iceland; Harvard University

Geir Hallgrímsson (16 December 1925 – 1 September 1990) was the prime minister of Iceland for the Independence Party from 28 August 1974 to 1 September 1978. Before that he had been mayor of Reykjavík from 1959 to 1972. Geir was a member of the Icelandic parliament, the Althing from 1973 to 1983. He served as Minister of Foreign Affairs from 1983 to 1986 and as the Governor of the Central Bank from 1986 to his death in 1990.

== Early life and education ==
Geir Hallgrímsson was born in Reykjavík and educated at Menntaskólinn í Reykjavík and at the University of Iceland, where he studied law; he spent a year in the US at Harvard University, studying law and economics.

== Career ==
Geir was mayor of Reykjavík from 1959 to 1972. During his term he greatly expanded the city and improved its infrastructure. Under his guidance the geothermal heating system was expanded to the whole city; it had previously only been available to less than half. He also improved the streets by turning the mostly gravel roads into modern asphalt streets. He was popular as mayor and in an open primary for the municipal elections he won 99% of the votes in 1970.

In the fall of 1970 he came in number one in the primary for elections to Althing, ahead of prime minister Jóhann Hafstein and former mayor Gunnar Thoroddsen. He was a member of parliament from 1970 (taking his permanent seat with the death of prime minister Bjarni Benediktsson) until 1983. In 1971 he was elected vice chairman of the Independence Party and in 1973 he became chairman after Jóhann Hafstein resigned for health reasons. In 1974 he led the Independence Party to one of its greatest victories. The party won 42.5% of the vote and 25 out of 60 parliamentary seats. He then led a coalition government with the Progressive party from 1974 to 1978.

His government expanded the fishing limits to 200 miles (370 km) and had to fight Britain in the 'Cod War'. After Iceland had broken diplomatic relations with Britain in 1976 over the dispute, negotiations led to an agreement in June that year. According to the agreement, Britain accepted the 200 mile zone.

In 1978 the government suffered a setback after it had set a law that limited wage increases. The law was an attempt to curb inflation, which was running close to 50%. The two government parties lost five parliamentary seats each and a new coalition government was formed without the Independence Party. A year later the Independence Party failed to make significant gains in an election after the government had resigned. Geir also faced opposition within his own party and came in number two in primary elections in 1978. Albert Guðmundssson won the first seat. A year later, Geir won the first seat back. He twice won elections against his opponents for the chairmanship. In both 1979 and 1981 he received about 75% of the vote, first against Albert Guðmundsson and then against Pálmi Jónsson, then minister of agriculture.

In 1980 the vice chairman of the Independence Party, Gunnar Thoroddsen, decided to break ranks with the party and lead a group of four members to form a coalition government with the People's Alliance and the Progressive Party. Geir was then leader of the opposition. The Independence Party was united in the 1983 parliamentary election. However Geir suffered a setback when he came in seventh in the primary for the parliamentary elections and lost his seat in parliament. After the elections he announced that he would not seek re-election as party chairman. He served as foreign minister in the coalition government with the Progressive Party from 1983 until 1986.

He left government in 1986, becoming one of the three Governors of the Central Bank of Iceland, a position he held until his death in September 1990, from an illness he had been dealing with for almost a year.

The islet of Geirsnef in Reykjavik was named after him.

Party political offices
Preceded by Jóhann Hafstein	Leader of the Independence Party; 1973–1983	Succeeded by Þorsteinn Pálsson
Political offices
Preceded by Ólafur Jóhannesson	Prime Minister of Iceland; 1974–1978	Succeeded by Ólafur Jóhannesson
