= Eggert Gíslason Þorsteinsson =

Icelandic politician (1925–1995)

Eggert Gíslason Þorsteinsson (6 July 1925 – 9 May 1995) was an Icelandic politician. He was the minister for social affairs from August 1965 to July 1970.
