= People's Unity Party – Socialist Party =

People's Unity Party – Socialist Party Sameiningarflokkur alþýðu – Sósíalistaflokkurinn
- Leader: Einar Olgeirsson
- Founder: Héðinn Valdimarsson
- Founded: 24 October 1938
- Dissolved: 1968
- Merger of: Communist Party of Iceland; Workers' Party of the Left Socialists
- Merged into: People's Alliance
- Headquarters: Reykjavík
- Newspaper: Þjóðviljinn
- Ideology: Socialism; Anti-fascism
- Political position: Left-wing

The People's Unity Party – Socialist Party (Icelandic: Sameiningarflokkur alþýðu – Sósíalistaflokkurinn), generally referred to as the Socialist Party (Icelandic: Sósíalistaflokkurinn), was an Icelandic political party that functioned from 1938 to 1968, when the People's Alliance party was created.

== History ==
It was formed through the merger of the Communist Party of Iceland (KFI) and another splinter group from the Social Democratic Party on the grounds that a united front was needed against fascism, according to the guidelines put forth by the Comintern. The formation of the Socialist Party was a result of the Popular Front line embraced by ComIntern, and promoted in Iceland by Einar Olgeirsson of the KFI. Philosopher Jon Olafsson has argued that as it resulted in a split within the larger Social Democratic Party, Comintern did not approve of the merger in its eventual form. This has been contested by historians Thor Whitehead and Hannes H. Gissurarson in books about the communist movement.

The Socialist Party maintained cordial relations with the Communist Party of the Soviet Union. In 1939, the chairmanship was taken over by Einar Olgeirsson, after the previous non-communist chairman had left the party in protest against the refusal of his new allies to condemn the attack by the USSR on Finland in the Winter War.

During the Second World War, the influence of the party grew. In the 1942 elections it won over its mother organization, the Social Democrats. The Socialist Party clearly supported the formation of the Icelandic Republic in 1944. During the two first years of independence, the Socialist Party took part in a broad coalition government. The coalition broke down on the issue of the claims of the United States to have a military base in Keflavík, which the socialists opposed.

In 1956, the Socialist Party took part in the People's Alliance along with the Egalitarian Society and Hannibal Valdimarsson. When the People's Alliance was made into a formal political party in 1968, the Socialist Party was merged into it and thus became defunct as an independent entity.

== Election results ==
Election	Votes	Vote %	Seats	Place
July 1942	9,423	16.2	6	3rd
October 1942	11,059 ▲	18.5 ▲	10 ▲	3rd
1946	13,049 ▲	19.5 ▲	10	3rd
1949	14,077 ▲	19.5	9 ▼	3rd
1953	12,422 ▼	16.0 ▼	7 ▼	3rd

== Sources ==
- Arnór Hannibalsson: Moskvulínan. Reykjavík 1999: Nýja bókafélagið.
- Einar Olgeirsson: Kraftaverk einnar kynslóðar. Jón Guðnason skráði. Reykjavík 1983: Mál og menning.
- Hannes Hólmsteinn Gissurarson: Íslenskir kommúnistar 1918–1998. Reykjavík 2011: Almenna bókafélagið.
- Jón Ólafsson: Kæru félagar. Reykjavík 1999: Mál og menning.
- Þór Whitehead: Sovét-Ísland. Óskalandið. Reykjavík 2010: Ugla.
- Hannes H. Gissurarson: Communism in Iceland, 1918–1998 Social Science Research Institute at the University of Iceland, Reykjavik 2021.
