= Jónas Jónsson =

Icelandic educator and politician

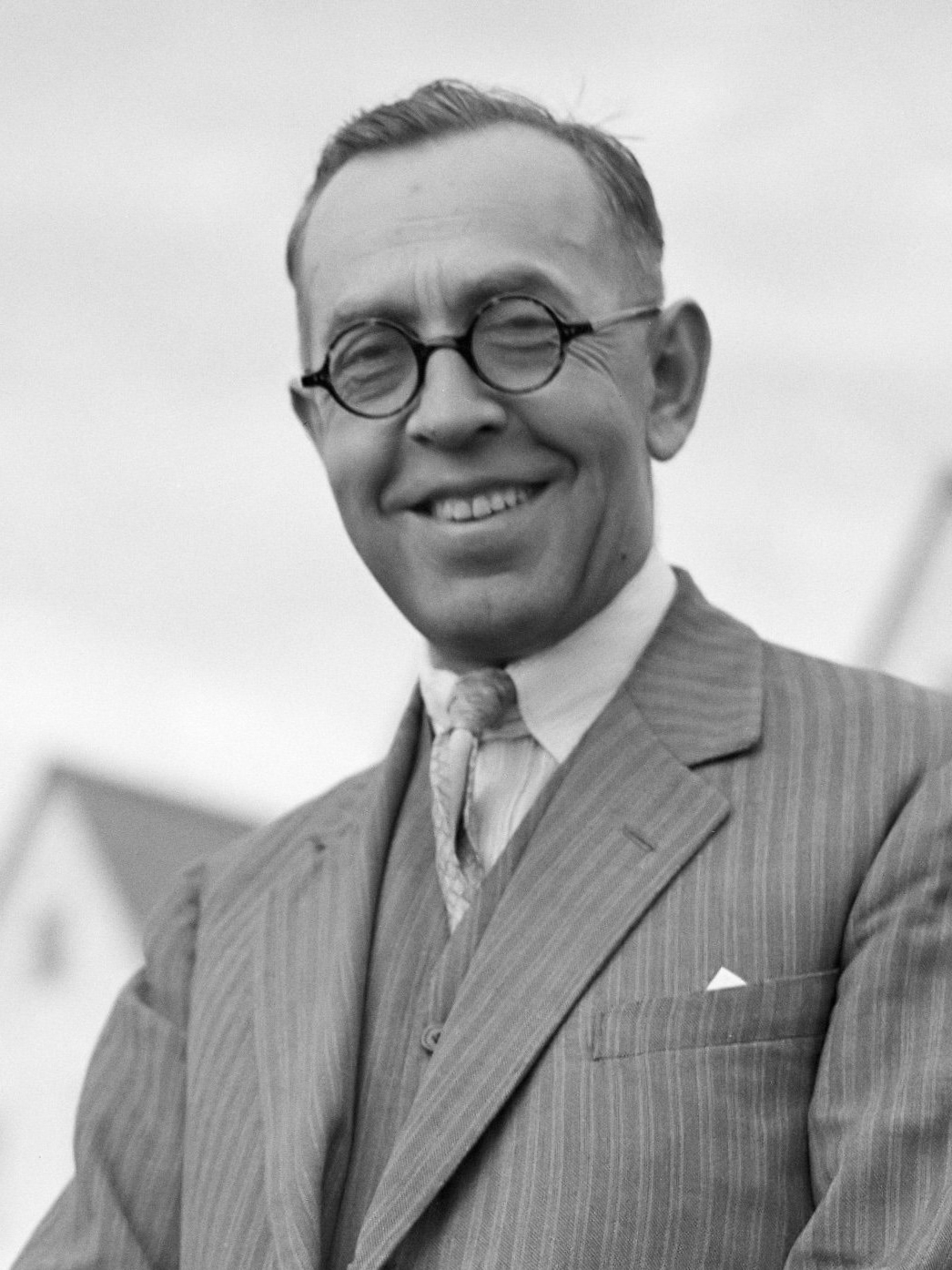

5th Minister of Justice
- In office 28 August 1927 – 20 April 1931
- Prime Minister: Tryggvi Þórhallsson
- Preceded by: Magnús Guðmundsson
- Succeeded by: Tryggvi Þórhallsson

Personal details
- Born: 1 May 1885 Hrifla, Kingdom of Iceland
- Died: 19 July 1968 (aged 83) Reykjavík, Iceland
- Party: Progressive Party
- Spouse: Guðrún Stefánsdóttir (m. 1912)
- Children: 2

Jónas Jónsson (also known as Jónas frá Hriflu; May 1, 1885 – July 19, 1968) was an Icelandic educator and politician, and one of the most influential people in 20th-century Icelandic culture and politics. Initially an educator and writer of textbooks, he was chairman of the Progressive Party for ten years, and Minister of Justice from 1927 to 1932.

== Biography ==
Jónas was born in Hrifla in Suður-Þingeyjarsýsla. He studied at Möðruvalla School and wanted to attend the Reykjavík Latin School in 1905, but could not afford it—by the time his family had saved enough money he was rejected (by rector Steingrímur Thorsteinsson) for being too old.

Instead, he attended the Askov Folk High School in Denmark, and then moved to England to attend Ruskin College in Oxford, known as an institution for working-class students. On his return to Iceland, in 1909, he found himself in opposition to the class of newly wealthy Icelanders and became involved in politics. He was elected MP in 1922 for the Progressive Party, a Liberal and agrarian-centrist party, a seat he held until 1949. He became attorney general in 1927, and was Minister of Justice from 1927 to 1932. He was chairman of the Progressive Party for ten years, from 1934 to 1944.

== Legacy ==
Jónas was the author of the "immensely influential primer" Íslandssaga handa börnum ("History of Iceland for children", 2 vols., Reykjavík, 1915–1916). The primer molded the "historical perception of generations of Icelanders" until the 1970s, when it was no longer being used in education. The textbook reflects the nationalist account of Icelandic history (originally introduced by Jón Jónsson Aðils) wherein the Icelandic nation prospered as an independent nation during the medieval period but suffered degradation for centuries after it gave up its sovereignty to the Norwegian King by signing the Old Covenant (1262). According to his textbook, Icelanders had a special status since they hailed from descendants of those who fled the rule of Harald Fairhair, an especially hardy stock of Norwegians; in combination with the harsh natural environment this produced the "unique Icelandic nation". According to historian Thorsteinn Helgason, Jónas' textbook presents the Icelandic nation "as a homogenous and united flock, while foreigners, mainly the Danes, are depicted as evil. More or less fictional figures from mediaeval sagas, together with literary and political personalities of all eras, populate the scene. The book was written during a sensitive period when separation from Denmark was heavily debated, and it was clearly an argument for separation."

== Sources ==
- Jónas Jónsson frá Hriflu, official biography at Alþingi (in Icelandic)
