= Jóhann Hafstein =

Icelandic politician

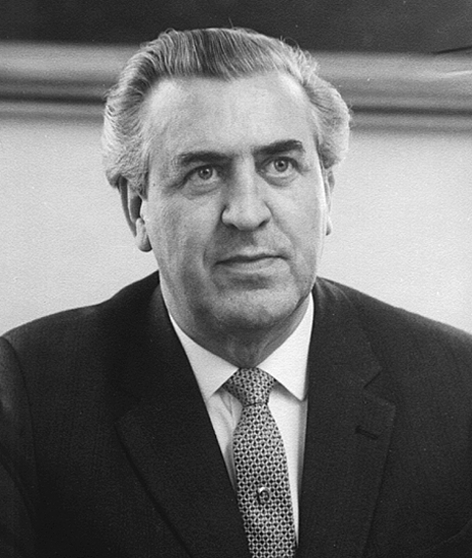

18th Prime Minister of Iceland
- In office 10 July 1970 – 14 July 1971
- President: Kristján Eldjárn
- Preceded by: Bjarni Benediktsson
- Succeeded by: Ólafur Jóhannesson

Personal details
- Born: 19 September 1915 Akureyri, Iceland
- Died: 15 May 1980 (aged 64)
- Party: Independence Party
- Education: University of Iceland

Jóhann Hafstein (19 September 1915 – 15 May 1980) was elected to the Althingi for the Reykjavík constituency in 1946, which he represented until 1978, when he resigned due to ill health. Jóhann served as prime minister of Iceland from 10 July 1970 to 14 July 1971, for the Independence Party, following the death of prime minister Bjarni Benediktsson, his wife and their 4-year-old grandson, caused by a fire at a government summer house at Þingvellir on 10 July 1970. Hafstein also become the chairman for the Independence Party immediately. Hafstein's cabinet was replaced and defeated in the 1971 parliamentary election, causing him to step down as prime minister. Hafstein stepped down as party leader in 1973 following health problems. He died on 15 May 1980 due to a long illness that had previously caused him to resign two years earlier.

Hafstein was Speaker of the Lower House of the Althingi from 1959–1961 and 1962–1963. He was the CEO of the Fisheries Bank from 1952 to 1963. He served as Minister of Justice, Religion and Industrial Affairs, as well as handling the Health portfolio in 1961 and again in 1963–1970. He attended the General Assembly of the United Nations in 1953, 1959 and 1974.

Party political offices
Preceded by Bjarni Benediktsson	Leader of the Independence Party; 1970–1973	Succeeded by Geir Hallgrímsson
Political offices
Preceded by Bjarni Benediktsson	Prime Minister of Iceland; 1970–1971	Succeeded by Ólafur Jóhannesson
