= Magnús Jónsson (Minister of Finance) =

Icelandic politician

Magnús Jónsson (7 September 1919 – 13 January 1984) was an Icelandic politician and former minister. He was the Minister of Finance of Iceland from 1965 to 1971.

He was a member of the Icelandic Order of Freemasons.
