= Stefán Jóhann Stefánsson =

Prime Minister of Iceland (1894–1980)

Stefán Stefánsson
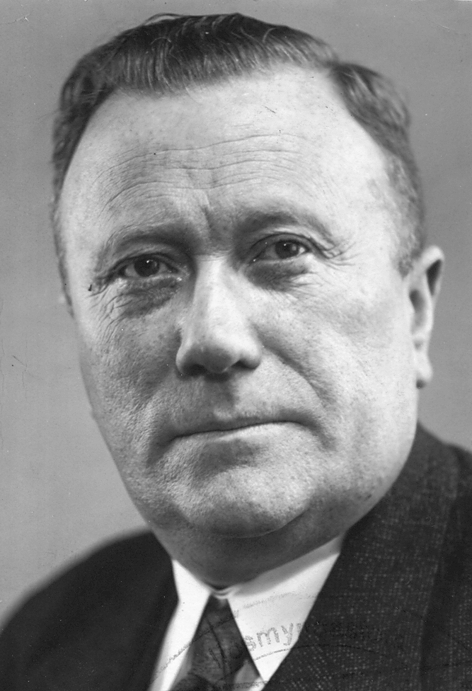

14th Prime Minister of Iceland
- In office 4 February 1947 – 6 December 1949
- President: Sveinn Björnsson
- Preceded by: Ólafur Thors
- Succeeded by: Ólafur Thors

Minister of Foreign Affairs
- In office 18 November 1941 – 17 January 1942
- Prime Minister: Hermann Jónasson
- Preceded by: Position established
- Succeeded by: Ólafur Thors

Minister of Social Affairs
- In office 4 February 1947 – 6 December 1949
- Prime Minister: Himself
- Preceded by: Finnur Jónsson
- Succeeded by: Ólafur Thors
- In office 17 April 1939 – 17 January 1942
- Prime Minister: Hermann Jónasson
- Preceded by: Position established
- Succeeded by: Jakob Möller

Personal details
- Born: 20 July 1894 Dagverðareyri, Iceland
- Died: 20 October 1980 (aged 86) Reykjavík, Iceland
- Party: Social Democratic Party

Stefán Jóhann Stefánsson (20 July 1894 – 20 October 1980) was the first actual minister of Foreign Affairs in Iceland from 18 November 1941 to 17 January 1942. He was prime minister of Iceland from 4 February 1947 to 6 December 1949. He was first elected to the Althing in 1934 but did not get reelected in 1937. From 1942 to 1953, he regained his seat in the Althing. He was chairman of the now defunct Social Democratic Party (Alþýðuflokkurinn) from 1938 to 1952. He was ambassador of Iceland in Denmark from 1957 to 1965. He was minister for social affairs from 1939 to 1941 and Minister of Foreign and Social Affairs from 1941 to 1942. He was Prime-Minister when Iceland joined NATO in 1949; leading a coalition consisting of his own Social Democratic Party together with the Independence Party and Progressive Party.

He was born in Dagverðareyri, Iceland, to Stefán Ágúst Oddsson and Ólöf Árnadóttir. Stefán gained his degree in Law in 1922. He was Social Affairs Minister in 1939 and Secretary of State in 1940–1942. Stefán died in a hospital in Reykjavík on 20 October 1980.

Political offices
Preceded by Ólafur Thors	Prime Minister of Iceland; 1947–1949	Succeeded by Ólafur Thors
