= Einar Olgeirsson =

Icelandic politician (1902–1993)

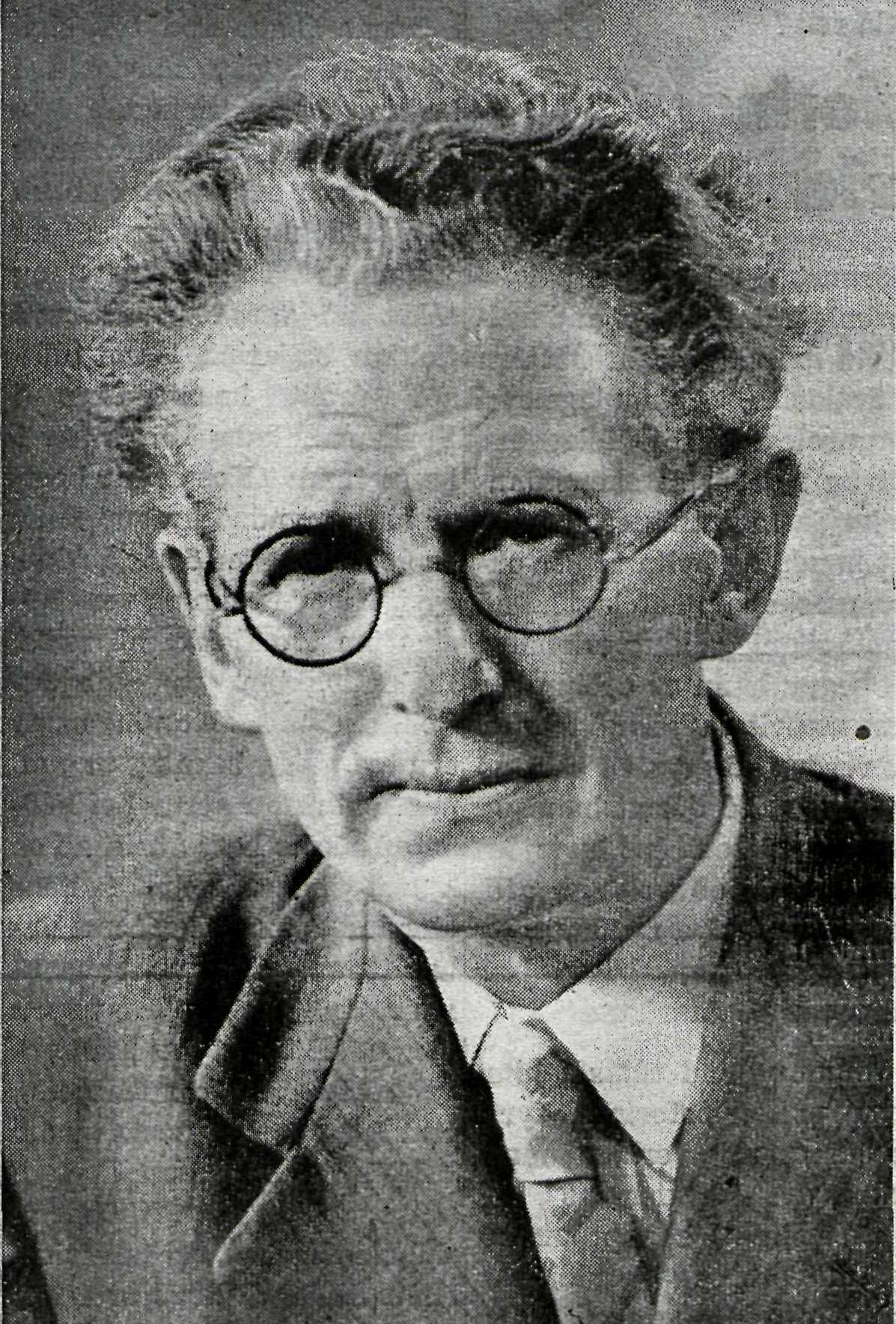

Personal details
- Born: 14 August 1902 Akureyri, Iceland
- Died: 3 February 1993 (aged 90) Hafnarfjörður, Iceland
- Party: Communist Party of Iceland; People's Unity Party – Socialist Party; People's Alliance
- Education: Friedrich Wilhelm University

Einar Olgeirsson (14 August 1902 – 3 February 1993) was an Icelandic socialist politician and editor of a number of left-wing newspapers.

== Biography ==
Einar was born in Akureyri. In 1921, he graduated from Reykjavik Junior College. He later studied German and English literature at the Friedrich Wilhelm University in Berlin in the years 1921–1924, but did not graduate. After returning to Iceland, Einar worked as a teacher in Akureyri in 1924–1928. In 1928–1931, he served the Chairman of the Akureyri Workers' Union and as a representative to the town council. He was one of the co-founders of the Communist Party of Iceland in 1930.

As a leading member of the Communist Party, Einar was one of the main proponents in Iceland behind the popular front line, promoted by the Comintern as a means to resist the growth of fascism during the second half of the 1930s. This resulted in the merging of the Icelandic Communist Party and the left-wing faction of the Social Democratic Party into the People's Unity Party – Socialist Party in 1938. Einar would later serve as chairman of the People's Unity Party – Socialist Party during the years 1939–1968, making him one of the most influential socialist politicians in Iceland during the 20th century.

Einar was a member of the Althing, the Icelandic parliament, in the years 1937–1968: there, he served as a representative for the Communist Party until the party's merging into the People's Unity Party – Socialist Party in 1938. He then represented the People's Unity Party – Socialist Party in parliament until 1956, when he became a representative of the People's Alliance, an electoral alliance formed by the People's Unity Party – Socialist Party and another left-wing faction of the Social Democratic Party.

As part of his political activity, Einar was also the editor of several left-wing newspapers, including Þjóðviljinn in the years 1936–1946. During the Allied occupation of Iceland, Þjóðviljinn was accused of spreading propaganda against the British Army. As a result, Einar was arrested by the British in April 1941 and transferred to London, where he was imprisoned in HM Prison Brixton for several months. He was released and allowed to return to Iceland during the summer of 1941.

After the end of World War II, Einar was a member of several government committees until the 1970s. In the years 1957–1963 he served as a representative of Iceland to the Nordic Council, and in the years 1957–1981 he was a member of the Board of Directors of Landsbanki. He died in Hafnarfjörður in 1993.
