= Ólafur Thors =

Icelandic politician (1892–1964)

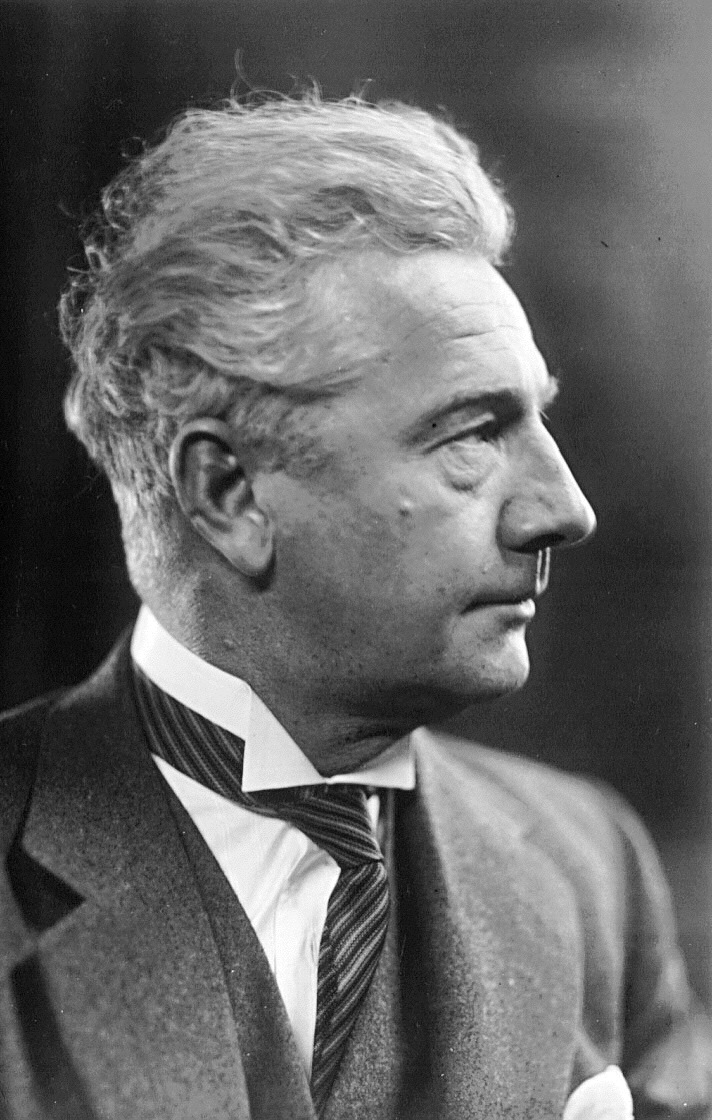

12th Prime Minister of Iceland
- In office 1 January 1962 – 14 November 1963
- President: Ásgeir Ásgeirsson
- Preceded by: Bjarni Benediktsson
- Succeeded by: Bjarni Benediktsson
- In office 20 November 1959 – 8 September 1961
- President: Ásgeir Ásgeirsson
- Preceded by: Emil Jónsson
- Succeeded by: Bjarni Benediktsson
- In office 11 September 1953 – 24 July 1956
- President: Ásgeir Ásgeirsson
- Preceded by: Steingrímur Steinþórsson
- Succeeded by: Hermann Jónasson
- In office 6 December 1949 – 14 March 1950
- President: Sveinn Björnsson
- Preceded by: Stefán Stefánsson
- Succeeded by: Steingrímur Steinþórsson
- In office 21 October 1944 – 4 February 1947
- President: Sveinn Björnsson
- Preceded by: Björn Þórðarson
- Succeeded by: Stefán Stefánsson
- In office 16 May 1942 – 16 December 1942
- Monarch: Christian X
- Preceded by: Hermann Jónasson
- Succeeded by: Björn Þórðarson

Minister for Foreign Affairs
- In office 21 October 1944 – 4 February 1947
- Prime Minister: Himself
- Preceded by: Vilhjálmur Þór
- Succeeded by: Bjarni Benediktsson
- In office 16 May 1942 – 16 December 1942
- Prime Minister: Himself
- Preceded by: Stefán Stefánsson
- Succeeded by: Vilhjálmur Þór

Personal details
- Born: 19 January 1892 Borgarnes, Danish Iceland
- Died: 31 December 1964 (aged 72) Reykjavík, Iceland
- Party: Independence Party
- Spouse: Ingibjörg Indriðadóttir
- Children: 4
- Parent(s): Thor Philip Axel Jensen; Margrét Þorbjörg Kristjánsdóttir
- Education: University of Copenhagen

Ólafur Tryggvason Thors (19 January 1892 – 31 December 1964) was an Icelandic politician of the Independence Party, who served six times as prime minister of Iceland.

== Career ==
The son of Margrét Þorbjörg Kristjánsdóttir and Danish Icelandic businessman Thor Philip Axel Jensen, Ólafur Thors was a member of parliament from 1926 until the day of his death in 1964. His first ministerial post was as a substitute justice minister from 14 November 1932 to 23 December 1932. In his political career he served as Minister of Industrial Affairs from 1939 to 1942, foreign minister in his own governments in 1942 and 1944–1947, social minister in his own government from 1949 to 1950, fisheries and industrial minister from 1950 to 1953, and fisheries minister in his own government from 1953 to 1956. He served as prime minister in 1942, again from 1944-1947, then again from 1949-1950, again from 1953-1956 and lastly from 1959 to 1963.

Although he did take a three-month hiatus from office in 1961 during a sick leave where Bjarni Benediktsson served as acting prime minister. Bjarni attended the UN General Assembly in 1947 and 1948. Ólafur Thors led the Independence Party from 1934 to 1961. His fifth government with the Social Democrats sat under two other prime ministers from the Independence Party until 1971.

Party political offices
Preceded by Jón Þorláksson	Leader of the Independence Party; 1934–1961	Succeeded by Bjarni Benediktsson
Political offices
Preceded by Hermann Jónasson	Prime Minister of Iceland; 1942	Succeeded by Björn Þórðarson
Preceded by Björn Þórðarson	Prime Minister of Iceland; 1944–1947	Succeeded by Stefán Stefánsson
Preceded by Stefán Stefánsson	Prime Minister of Iceland; 1949–1950	Succeeded by Steingrímur Steinþórsson
Preceded by Steingrímur Steinþórsson	Prime Minister of Iceland; 1953–1956	Succeeded by Hermann Jónasson
Preceded by Emil Jónsson	Prime Minister of Iceland; 1959–1963	Succeeded by Bjarni Benediktsson
