= List of state leaders of Iceland =

King of Iceland
- Konungur Íslands
- Arms of His Majesty the King of Iceland

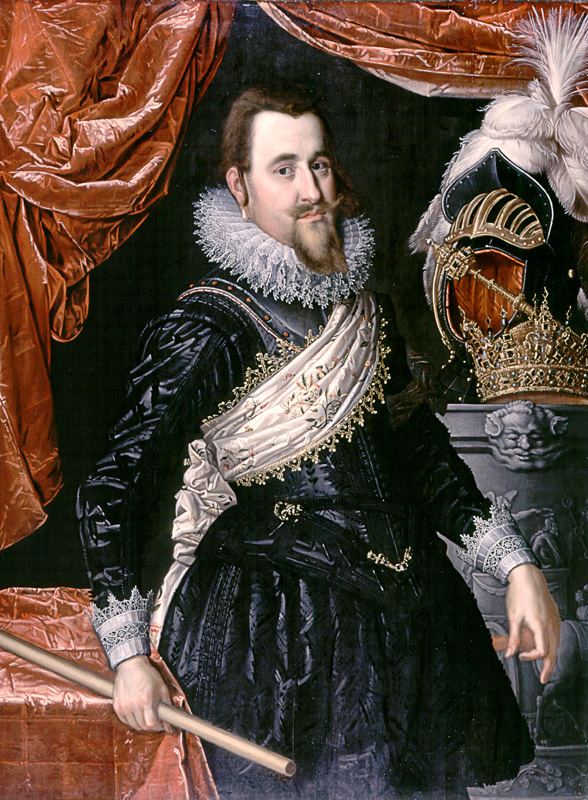
- Longest reigning Christian IV; 4 April 1588–28 February 1648

Details
- Style: His Majesty
- First monarch: Haakon IV
- Last monarch: Kristján X
- Formed: 1262
- Abolished: 17 June 1944

This is a list of heads of state of Iceland, including Kings of Norway from 1262 to 1814, Kings of Denmark from 1814 to 1918, the King of Iceland from 1918 to 1944 and Presidents of Iceland from 1944.

== Overview ==
Iceland was settled in the late 9th and early 10th centuries, principally by people of Norwegian and other Scandinavian origin. In 930, the ruling chiefs established a republican constitution and an assembly called the Althing—the oldest parliament in the world. Iceland remained independent until 1262, when it entered into a treaty which established a union with the Norwegian monarchy. In the late 14th century Norway and Denmark entered into a union. The union between Denmark and Norway, ignoring some shorter periods, lasted until 1814, when Norway briefly gained independence, and Iceland became an integral part of Denmark until 1918, when Iceland was recognised as a fully sovereign state in personal union with Denmark under a common monarch, on 1 December that same year.

Following a constitutional referendum between 20 and 23 May 1944, Iceland formally became an independent republic on 17 June 1944. Since Denmark was still occupied by Germany, many Danes felt offended that the step should have been taken at the time. Still, the last King of Iceland, Kristján X, sent a message of congratulations to the Icelandic people.

== Kings of Norway (1262–1814) ==
Name	Lifespan	Reign start	Reign end	Notes	Family	Image
Haakon IV: the Old	1 April 1204 – 16 December 1263 (aged 59)	1262	16 December 1263	Son of Haakon III	Fairhair	Haakon IV of Norway
Magnus VI: the Law-mender	1 May 1238 – 9 May 1280 (aged 42)	16 December 1263	9 May 1280	Son of Haakon IV	Fairhair	Magnus VI of Norway
Eric II	1268 – 15 July 1299	9 May 1280	15 July 1299	Son of Magnus VI	Fairhair	Eric II of Norway
Haakon V	1270 – 8 May 1319	15 July 1299	8 May 1319	Son of Magnus VI	Fairhair	Haakon V of Norway
Magnus VII	1316 – 1 December 1374	1319	1 December 1374	Grandson of Haakon V	Bjälbo	Magnus VII of Norway
Haakon VI	1340 – 11 September 1380	15 August 1343	11 September 1380	Son of Magnus VII	Bjälbo	Haakon VI of Norway
Olaf IV	1370 – 3 August 1387	29 July 1380	3 August 1387	Son of Haakon VI	Bjälbo	Olaf IV of Norway
Margaret I	c. 1353 – 28 October 1412	2 February 1388	28 October 1412	Mother of Olaf IV	Estridsen	Margaret I of Norway
Eric III	c. 1381 – 3 May 1459	28 October 1412	1442	Son of Wartislaw VII, Duke of Pomerania	Griffins	Eric III of Norway
Christopher I	26 February 1416 – 5 January 1448 (aged 31)	1442	5 January 1448	Son of John, Count Palatine of Neumarkt	Palatinate-Neumarkt	Christopher I of Norway
Charles I	5 October 1409 – 14 May 1470 (aged 60)	20 November 1449	1450	Son of Knut Tordsson Bonde	Bonde	Charles I of Norway
Christian I	1426 – 21 May 1481	1450	21 May 1481	Son of Dietrich, Count of Oldenburg	Oldenburg	Christian I of Norway
John I	2 February 1455 – 20 February 1513 (aged 58)	1483	20 February 1513	Son of Christian I	Oldenburg	John I of Norway
Christian II	1 July 1481 – 25 January 1559 (aged 77)	22 July 1513	20 January 1523	Son of John I	Oldenburg	Christian II of Norway
Frederick I	7 October 1471 – 10 April 1533 (aged 61)	1523	10 April 1533	Son of Christian I	Oldenburg	Frederick I of Norway
Christian III	12 August 1503 – 1 January 1559 (aged 55)	1537	1 January 1559	Son of Frederick I	Oldenburg	Christian III of Norway
Frederick II	1 July 1534 – 4 April 1588 (aged 53)	1 January 1559	4 April 1588	Son of Christian III	Oldenburg	Frederick II of Norway
Christian IV	12 April 1577 – 28 February 1648 (aged 70)	4 April 1588	28 February 1648	Son of Frederick II	Oldenburg	Christian IV of Norway
Frederick III	18 March 1609 – 9 February 1670 (aged 60)	6 July 1648	9 February 1670	Son of Christian IV	Oldenburg	Frederick III of Norway
Christian V	15 April 1646 – 25 August 1699 (aged 53)	9 February 1670	25 August 1699	Son of Frederick III	Oldenburg	Christian V of Norway
Frederick IV	11 October 1671 – 12 October 1730 (aged 59)	25 August 1699	12 October 1730	Son of Christian V	Oldenburg	Frederick IV of Norway
Christian VI	30 November 1699 – 6 August 1746 (aged 46)	12 October 1730	6 August 1746	Son of Frederick IV	Oldenburg	Christian VI of Norway
Frederick V	31 March 1723 – 14 January 1766 (aged 42)	6 August 1746	14 January 1766	Son of Christian VI	Oldenburg	Frederick V of Norway
Christian VII	29 January 1749 – 13 March 1808 (aged 59)	14 January 1766	13 March 1808	Son of Frederick V	Oldenburg	Christian VII of Norway
Frederick VI	28 January 1768 – 3 December 1839 (aged 71)	13 March 1808	7 February 1814	Son of Christian VII	Oldenburg	Frederick VI of Norway

== Kings of Denmark (1814–1918) ==
Name	Lifespan	Reign start	Reign end	Notes	Family	Image
Frederick VI	28 January 1768 – 3 December 1839 (aged 71)	7 February 1814	3 December 1839	Son of Christian VII	Oldenburg	Frederick VI of Denmark
Christian VIII	18 September 1786 – 20 January 1848 (aged 61)	3 December 1839	20 January 1848	Son of Frederick, Hereditary Prince of Denmark and grandson of Frederick V	Oldenburg	Christian VIII of Denmark
Frederick VII	6 October 1808 – 15 November 1863 (aged 55)	20 January 1848	15 November 1863	Son of Christian VIII	Oldenburg	Frederick VII of Denmark
Christian IX	8 April 1818 – 29 January 1906 (aged 87)	15 November 1863	29 January 1906	Son of Friedrich Wilhelm, Duke of Schleswig-Holstein-Sonderburg-Glücksburg and great-grandson of Frederick V	Glücksburg	Christian IX of Denmark
Frederik VIII	3 June 1843 – 14 May 1912 (aged 68)	29 January 1906	14 May 1912	Son of Christian IX	Glücksburg	Frederik VIII of Denmark
Christian X	26 September 1870 – 20 April 1947 (aged 76)	14 May 1912	1 December 1918	Son of Frederik VIII	Glücksburg	Christian X of Denmark

== Kings of Iceland (1918–1944) ==
Name	Lifespan	Reign start	Reign end	Notes	Family	Image
Kristján X	26 September 1870 – 20 April 1947 (aged 76)	1 December 1918	17 June 1944	Son of Frederik VIII	Glücksburg	Christian X of Denmark

== Presidents of Iceland (1944–present) ==
There have been seven presidents since the establishment of the republic.

Term: ^{1} appointed · ^{2} died in office · ^{3} uncontested

No.	Portrait	Name	Took office	Left office	Duration	Term	Prime ministers
1		Sveinn Björnsson (1881–1952)	17 June 1944	25 January 1952^{2}	7 years, 7 months, 8 days (2,778 days)	1 (1944)^{1}	Björn Þórðarson; Ólafur Thors; Stefán Jóhann Stefánsson; Ólafur Thors; Steingrímur Steinþórsson
1		Sveinn Björnsson (1881–1952)	17 June 1944	25 January 1952^{2}	7 years, 7 months, 8 days (2,778 days)	2 (1945)^{3}	Björn Þórðarson; Ólafur Thors; Stefán Jóhann Stefánsson; Ólafur Thors; Steingrímur Steinþórsson
1		Sveinn Björnsson (1881–1952)	17 June 1944	25 January 1952^{2}	7 years, 7 months, 8 days (2,778 days)	3 (1949)^{3}	Björn Þórðarson; Ólafur Thors; Stefán Jóhann Stefánsson; Ólafur Thors; Steingrímur Steinþórsson
1		Sveinn Björnsson (1881–1952)	Regent of Iceland 1941–1944, later became the first president of Iceland. In 1950 considered forming a government that did not rely on parliamentary support after leaders of the parliamentary parties had reached an impasse. The only president to die in office; this led to a vacancy, the powers of the office being constitutionally vested jointly in the prime minister (Steingrímur Steinþórsson), the president of the Parliament (Jón Pálmason) and the president of the Supreme Court (Jón Ásbjörnsson).				
2		Ásgeir Ásgeirsson (1894–1972)	1 August 1952	31 July 1968	16 years (5,844 days)	4 (1952)	Steingrímur Steinþórsson; Ólafur Thors; Hermann Jónasson; Emil Jónsson; Ólafur Thors; Bjarni Benediktsson; Ólafur Thors; Bjarni Benediktsson
2		Ásgeir Ásgeirsson (1894–1972)	1 August 1952	31 July 1968	16 years (5,844 days)	5 (1956)^{3}	Steingrímur Steinþórsson; Ólafur Thors; Hermann Jónasson; Emil Jónsson; Ólafur Thors; Bjarni Benediktsson; Ólafur Thors; Bjarni Benediktsson
2		Ásgeir Ásgeirsson (1894–1972)	1 August 1952	31 July 1968	16 years (5,844 days)	6 (1960)^{3}	Steingrímur Steinþórsson; Ólafur Thors; Hermann Jónasson; Emil Jónsson; Ólafur Thors; Bjarni Benediktsson; Ólafur Thors; Bjarni Benediktsson
2		Ásgeir Ásgeirsson (1894–1972)	1 August 1952	31 July 1968	16 years (5,844 days)	7 (1964)^{3}	Steingrímur Steinþórsson; Ólafur Thors; Hermann Jónasson; Emil Jónsson; Ólafur Thors; Bjarni Benediktsson; Ólafur Thors; Bjarni Benediktsson
2		Ásgeir Ásgeirsson (1894–1972)	First president elected by popular vote.				
3		Kristján Eldjárn (1916–1982)	1 August 1968	31 July 1980	12 years (4,383 days)	8 (1968)	Bjarni Benediktsson; Jóhann Hafstein; Ólafur Jóhannesson; Geir Hallgrímsson; Ólafur Jóhannesson; Benedikt Sigurðsson Gröndal; Gunnar Thoroddsen
3		Kristján Eldjárn (1916–1982)	1 August 1968	31 July 1980	12 years (4,383 days)	9 (1972)^{3}	Bjarni Benediktsson; Jóhann Hafstein; Ólafur Jóhannesson; Geir Hallgrímsson; Ólafur Jóhannesson; Benedikt Sigurðsson Gröndal; Gunnar Thoroddsen
3		Kristján Eldjárn (1916–1982)	1 August 1968	31 July 1980	12 years (4,383 days)	10 (1976)^{3}	Bjarni Benediktsson; Jóhann Hafstein; Ólafur Jóhannesson; Geir Hallgrímsson; Ólafur Jóhannesson; Benedikt Sigurðsson Gröndal; Gunnar Thoroddsen
3		Kristján Eldjárn (1916–1982)	At one point considered forming a government that did not rely on parliamentary support after leaders of the parliamentary parties had reached an impasse.				
4		Vigdís Finnbogadóttir (born 1930)	1 August 1980	31 July 1996	16 years (5,844 days)	11 (1980)	Gunnar Thoroddsen; Steingrímur Hermannsson; Þorsteinn Pálsson; Steingrímur Hermannsson; Davíð Oddsson
4		Vigdís Finnbogadóttir (born 1930)	1 August 1980	31 July 1996	16 years (5,844 days)	12 (1984)^{3}	Gunnar Thoroddsen; Steingrímur Hermannsson; Þorsteinn Pálsson; Steingrímur Hermannsson; Davíð Oddsson
4		Vigdís Finnbogadóttir (born 1930)	1 August 1980	31 July 1996	16 years (5,844 days)	13 (1988)	Gunnar Thoroddsen; Steingrímur Hermannsson; Þorsteinn Pálsson; Steingrímur Hermannsson; Davíð Oddsson
4		Vigdís Finnbogadóttir (born 1930)	1 August 1980	31 July 1996	16 years (5,844 days)	14 (1992)^{3}	Gunnar Thoroddsen; Steingrímur Hermannsson; Þorsteinn Pálsson; Steingrímur Hermannsson; Davíð Oddsson
4		Vigdís Finnbogadóttir (born 1930)	Was the world's first elected female president. Won first term in office with the lowest historical share of the votes for a first-term election (33.79%) but overwhelmingly won her third-term election in 1988.				
5		Ólafur Ragnar Grímsson (born 1943)	1 August 1996	31 July 2016	20 years (7,305 days)	15 (1996)	Davíð Oddsson; Halldór Ásgrímsson; Geir Haarde; Jóhanna Sigurðardóttir; Sigmundur Davíð Gunnlaugsson; Sigurður Ingi Jóhannsson
5		Ólafur Ragnar Grímsson (born 1943)	1 August 1996	31 July 2016	20 years (7,305 days)	16 (2000)^{3}	Davíð Oddsson; Halldór Ásgrímsson; Geir Haarde; Jóhanna Sigurðardóttir; Sigmundur Davíð Gunnlaugsson; Sigurður Ingi Jóhannsson
5		Ólafur Ragnar Grímsson (born 1943)	1 August 1996	31 July 2016	20 years (7,305 days)	17 (2004)	Davíð Oddsson; Halldór Ásgrímsson; Geir Haarde; Jóhanna Sigurðardóttir; Sigmundur Davíð Gunnlaugsson; Sigurður Ingi Jóhannsson
5		Ólafur Ragnar Grímsson (born 1943)	1 August 1996	31 July 2016	20 years (7,305 days)	18 (2008)^{3}	Davíð Oddsson; Halldór Ásgrímsson; Geir Haarde; Jóhanna Sigurðardóttir; Sigmundur Davíð Gunnlaugsson; Sigurður Ingi Jóhannsson
5		Ólafur Ragnar Grímsson (born 1943)	1 August 1996	31 July 2016	20 years (7,305 days)	19 (2012)	Davíð Oddsson; Halldór Ásgrímsson; Geir Haarde; Jóhanna Sigurðardóttir; Sigmundur Davíð Gunnlaugsson; Sigurður Ingi Jóhannsson
5		Ólafur Ragnar Grímsson (born 1943)	First to use the constitutional veto power under Article 26 to deny signing a law from the Parliament. Used it again on two occasions.				
6		Guðni Thorlacius Jóhannesson (born 1968)	1 August 2016	31 July 2024	8 years (2,921 days)	20 (2016)	Sigurður Ingi Jóhannsson; Bjarni Benediktsson; Katrín Jakobsdóttir; Bjarni Benediktsson
6		Guðni Thorlacius Jóhannesson (born 1968)	1 August 2016	31 July 2024	8 years (2,921 days)	21 (2020)	Sigurður Ingi Jóhannsson; Bjarni Benediktsson; Katrín Jakobsdóttir; Bjarni Benediktsson
6		Guðni Thorlacius Jóhannesson (born 1968)	The youngest person to become President of Iceland, overwhelmingly won his second-term election in 2020.				
7		Halla Tómasdóttir (born 1968)	1 August 2024	Incumbent	2 years, 113 days	22 (2024)	Bjarni Benediktsson; Kristrún Frostadóttir
7		Halla Tómasdóttir (born 1968)	Won with the second lowest historical share of the votes for a first-term election (34.15%). This was her second attempt at a presidential run, the first one having been in 2016 where she came in second.				

== See also ==
- Jørgen Jørgensen, Jörundur hundadagakonungur ("Jørgen the dog-days King" in Icelandic), a Danish adventurer that proclaimed himself temporary king during some months of 1809
- History of Iceland
- List of Norwegian monarchs
- List of Danish monarchs
- List of Swedish monarchs
- List of monarchs and heads of state of Finland
- List of Greenlandic rulers
