= President of Iceland =

Head of state

- Forseti Íslands (Icelandic)
- Presidential Coat of Arms

- Presidential Standard

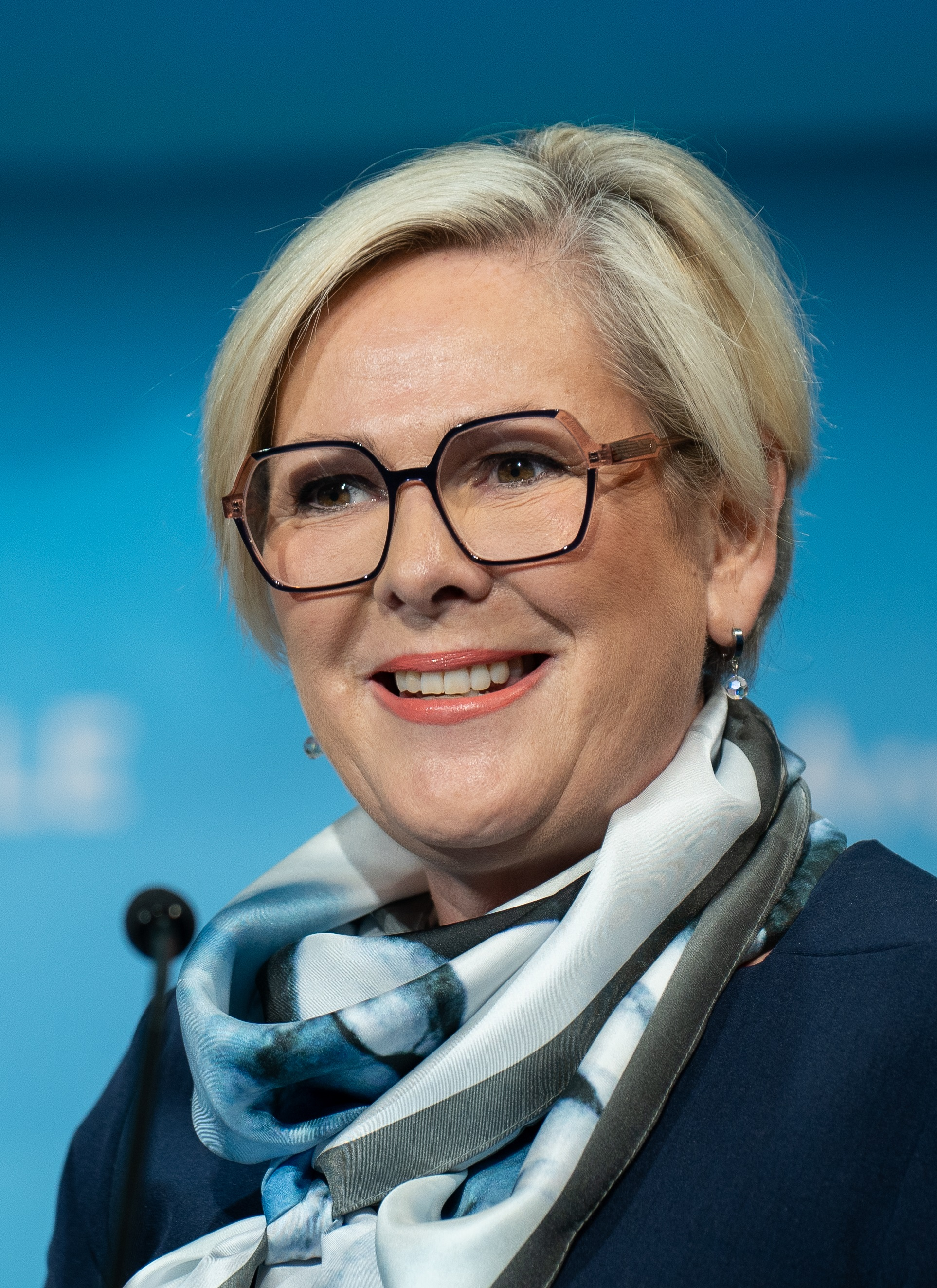
- Incumbent; Halla Tómasdóttir since 1 August 2024
- Office of the President
- Style: Madam/Mr President (informal); His/Her Excellency (diplomatic)
- Member of: State Council of Iceland
- Residence: Bessastaðir
- Seat: Garðabær, Iceland
- Appointer: Popular vote (plurality voting) (Note: Per Article 5 of the Constitution.)
- Term length: Four years, no term limits
- Constituting instrument: Constitution of Iceland (1944)
- Precursor: King of Iceland
- Formation: 17 June 1944; 82 years ago
- First holder: Sveinn Björnsson
- Succession: Line of succession
- Salary: €289,000 annually
- Website: forseti.is/en (in English) forseti.is (in Icelandic)

The president of Iceland (Icelandic: Forseti Íslands) is the head of state of Iceland. The incumbent is Halla Tómasdóttir, who won the 2024 presidential election.

The president is not involved in the running of the country, but serves as the head of the state and formally appoints new governments and their ministers.

The president is elected by popular vote to a four-year term, and can be reelected any number of times. Historically, while first-term elections have often been hard-fought, an incumbent president who decides to seek another term has usually run unopposed, or they have won re-election with an overwhelming majority of the vote when opposed. The 2012 election was a notable exception to this, where incumbent Ólafur Ragnar Grímsson won with only 52.78% of the vote.

Iceland was the first country to have an elected female head of state when Vigdís Finnbogadóttir assumed Iceland's presidency on 1 August 1980.

The presidential residence is situated in Bessastaðir in Garðabær, near the capital city Reykjavík.

== Origin ==
When Iceland became a republic in 1944 by the passing of a new constitution the position of King of Iceland was simply replaced by the president of Iceland. A transitional provision of the new constitution stipulated that the first president be elected by the Parliament.

=== Etymology ===
The term for president in Icelandic is forseti. The word forseti means one who sits foremost (sá sem fremst situr) in Old Norse/Icelandic or literally fore-sitter. It is the name of one of the Æsir, the god of justice and reconciliation in Norse mythology. He is generally identified with Fosite, a god of the Frisians.

== Powers and duties ==
=== Executive powers ===
==== Cabinet ====
The president appoints ministers to the Cabinet of Iceland, determines their number and division of assignments. Ministers are not able to resign and must be discharged by the president.

While the president is vested with executive power, they are not responsible for exercising it. Their acts are not valid without the countersignature of a minister, who then assumes political responsibility for the act.

In the aftermath of general elections, the president has the role to designate a party leader (the one that the president considers most likely to be able to form a majority coalition government) to formally start negotiations to form a government. Sveinn Björnsson and Ásgeir Ásgeirsson played highly active roles in the formation of governments, attempting to set up governments that suited their political preferences, whereas Kristján Eldjárn and Vigdís Finnbogadóttir were passive and neutral as to individuals and parties comprising the government.

==== State Council ====
The president and the Cabinet meet in the State Council. The Cabinet must inform the president of important matters of the state and drafted bills. During meetings the Cabinet may also suggest convening, adjourning or dissolving the Parliament.

==== Prosecution and pardoning ====
The president can decide that the prosecution for an offense be discontinued and can also grant pardon and amnesty.

=== Legislative powers ===
Article 2 of the constitution states that the president and the Parliament jointly exercise the legislative power. The president signs bills passed by the Parliament into law and can choose not to sign them, thus in effect vetoing them. Bills vetoed by the president still take effect, should the Parliament not withdraw them, but they must be confirmed in a referendum. Ólafur Ragnar Grímsson (who served 1996–2016) is the only president to have vetoed legislation from Parliament, having done so on three occasions (2004, 2010, 2011). This power was originally intended to be used only in extremely extenuating circumstances.

The president has the power to submit bills and resolutions to the Parliament which it must take under consideration. Should the Parliament not be in session, the president can issue provisional laws which must conform with the constitution. Provisional laws become void if the Parliament does not confirm them when it convenes. No president has ever submitted bills nor resolutions, nor issued provisional laws.

Article 30 of the constitution states that the president can grant exceptions from laws. No president has yet exercised this authority.

==== Parliament ====
The president convenes the Parliament after general elections and formally dissolves it. They can temporarily adjourn its sessions and move them if they deem it necessary. Furthermore, the president opens all regular sessions of the Parliament each year.

=== Ceremonial duties ===
The president is the designated grand master of the Order of the Falcon.

== Detailed powers ==
Powers of the President of Iceland
| Article in the Constitution | Power |
|---|---|
| Article 15 | The President appoints Ministers and discharges them. He determines their number and assignments. |
| Article 19 | The signature of the President validates a legislative act or government measure when countersigned by a Minister. |
| Article 21 | The President of the Republic concludes treaties with other States. Unless approved by Althingi, he may not make such treaties if they entail renouncement of, or servitude on, territory or territorial waters, or if they require changes in the State system. |
| Article 23 | The President of the Republic may adjourn sessions of Althingi for a limited period of time, but not exceeding two weeks nor more than once a year. Althingi may, however, authorize the President to deviate from this provision. If sessions of Althingi have been adjourned, the President of the Republic may nevertheless convene Althingi as deemed necessary. Moreover, the President, is obliged to do so upon the request of a majority of the Members of Althingi. |
| Article 24 | The President of the Republic may dissolve Althingi. A new election must take place within 45 days from the announcement of the dissolution. Althingi shall convene not later than ten weeks after its dissolution. Members of Althingi shall retain their mandate until Election Day. |
| Article 25 | The President of the Republic may have bills and draft resolutions submitted to Althingi. |
| Article 26 | If Althingi has passed a bill, it shall be submitted to the President of the Republic for confirmation not later than two weeks after it has been passed. Such confirmation gives it the force of law. If the President rejects a bill, it shall nevertheless become valid but shall, as soon as circumstances permit, be submitted to a vote by secret ballot of all those eligible to vote, for approval or rejection. The law shall become void if rejected, but otherwise retains its force. |
| Article 28 | In case of urgency, the President may issue provisional laws when Althingi is not in session. Such laws must not, however, be contrary to the Constitution. They shall always be submitted to Althingi as soon as it convenes.If Althingi does not approve a provisional law, or if it does not complete its consideration of the law within six weeks after convening, the law shall become void. |
| Article 29 | The President may decide that the prosecution for an offense be discontinued if there are strong reasons therefor. The President grants pardon and amnesty. However, he may not absolve a Minister from prosecution or from a punishment imposed by the Court of Impeachment, unless approved by Althingi. |
| Article 30 | The President, or other governmental authorities entrusted by the President, grants exemptions from laws in accordance with established practice. |

== Compensation ==
The president receives a monthly salary of 2,480,341 ISK. Article 9 of the constitution states the salary cannot be lowered for an incumbent president.

== Residence ==
Article 12 of the constitution states that the president shall reside in or near Reykjavík. Since inception the official residence of the president has been Bessastaðir which is in Álftanes.

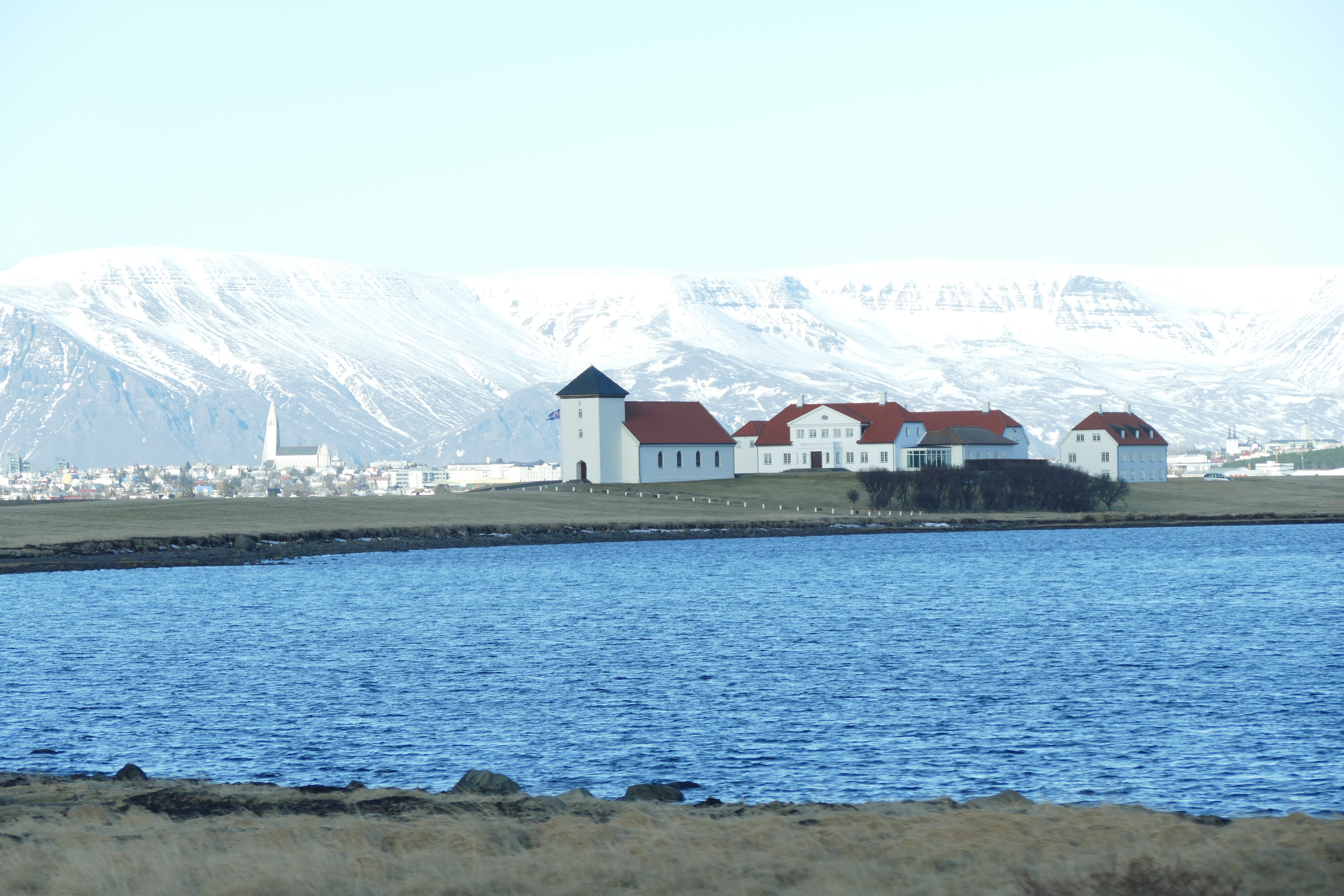
Bessastaðir with Reykjavík in the background

== Eligibility ==
Articles 4 and 5 of the constitution set the following qualifications for holding the presidency:

- meet the qualifications specified for members of the Althingi
- be at least thirty-five years old
- have at least 1,500 commendations

== Succession ==
Articles 7 and 8 of the constitution state that when the president dies, resigns or is otherwise unable to perform their duties, such as when they are abroad or sick, the prime minister, the president of the Parliament and the president of the Supreme Court shall collectively assume the power of the office until the president can resume their duties or a new president has been elected. Their meetings are led by the president of the Parliament where they vote on any presidential decision.

The above also occurs as an interregnum between the expiration of the previous president's term at midnight on 1 August and the inauguration of their successor.

If the office of the president becomes vacant because of death or resignation, a new president shall be elected by the general public to a four-year term ending on 1 August in the fourth year after the elections. Sveinn Björnsson remains the only president to die in office in 1952, triggering a presidential election one year ahead of schedule.

== Removal ==
Article 11 of the constitution lays out the process by which the president can be removed from office. It states that the president does not bear responsibility for the actions of their government and that they can not be prosecuted without consent of the Parliament. A referendum instigated by the Parliament with 3/4 support must approve of their removal. Once the Parliament has approved of the referendum, the president must temporarily step aside until the results of the referendum are known. The referendum must be held within two months of the vote, and, should the removal be rejected by the people, then the Parliament must immediately be dissolved and a new general election held.

A removal from office has not occurred since the founding of the republic.

== List ==
There have been seven presidents since the establishment of the republic.

Term: ^{1} appointed · ^{2} died in office · ^{3} uncontested

| No. | Portrait | Name | Took office | Left office | Duration | Term | Prime ministers |
|---|---|---|---|---|---|---|---|
| 1 | | Sveinn Björnsson (1881–1952) | 17 June 1944 | 25 January 1952^{2} | 7 years, 7 months, 8 days (2,778 days) | 1 (1944)^{1} | Björn Þórðarson; Ólafur Thors; Stefán Jóhann Stefánsson; Ólafur Thors; Steingrímur Steinþórsson |
| 1 | | Sveinn Björnsson (1881–1952) | 17 June 1944 | 25 January 1952^{2} | 7 years, 7 months, 8 days (2,778 days) | 2 (1945)^{3} | Björn Þórðarson; Ólafur Thors; Stefán Jóhann Stefánsson; Ólafur Thors; Steingrímur Steinþórsson |
| 1 | | Sveinn Björnsson (1881–1952) | 17 June 1944 | 25 January 1952^{2} | 7 years, 7 months, 8 days (2,778 days) | 3 (1949)^{3} | Björn Þórðarson; Ólafur Thors; Stefán Jóhann Stefánsson; Ólafur Thors; Steingrímur Steinþórsson |
| 1 | | Sveinn Björnsson (1881–1952) | Regent of Iceland 1941–1944, later became the first president of Iceland. In 1950 considered forming a government that did not rely on parliamentary support after leaders of the parliamentary parties had reached an impasse. The only president to die in office; this led to a vacancy, the powers of the office being constitutionally vested jointly in the prime minister (Steingrímur Steinþórsson), the president of the Parliament (Jón Pálmason) and the president of the Supreme Court (Jón Ásbjörnsson). | | | | |
| 2 | | Ásgeir Ásgeirsson (1894–1972) | 1 August 1952 | 31 July 1968 | 16 years (5,844 days) | 4 (1952) | Steingrímur Steinþórsson; Ólafur Thors; Hermann Jónasson; Emil Jónsson; Ólafur Thors; Bjarni Benediktsson; Ólafur Thors; Bjarni Benediktsson |
| 2 | | Ásgeir Ásgeirsson (1894–1972) | 1 August 1952 | 31 July 1968 | 16 years (5,844 days) | 5 (1956)^{3} | Steingrímur Steinþórsson; Ólafur Thors; Hermann Jónasson; Emil Jónsson; Ólafur Thors; Bjarni Benediktsson; Ólafur Thors; Bjarni Benediktsson |
| 2 | | Ásgeir Ásgeirsson (1894–1972) | 1 August 1952 | 31 July 1968 | 16 years (5,844 days) | 6 (1960)^{3} | Steingrímur Steinþórsson; Ólafur Thors; Hermann Jónasson; Emil Jónsson; Ólafur Thors; Bjarni Benediktsson; Ólafur Thors; Bjarni Benediktsson |
| 2 | | Ásgeir Ásgeirsson (1894–1972) | 1 August 1952 | 31 July 1968 | 16 years (5,844 days) | 7 (1964)^{3} | Steingrímur Steinþórsson; Ólafur Thors; Hermann Jónasson; Emil Jónsson; Ólafur Thors; Bjarni Benediktsson; Ólafur Thors; Bjarni Benediktsson |
| 2 | | Ásgeir Ásgeirsson (1894–1972) | First president elected by popular vote. | | | | |
| 3 | | Kristján Eldjárn (1916–1982) | 1 August 1968 | 31 July 1980 | 12 years (4,383 days) | 8 (1968) | Bjarni Benediktsson; Jóhann Hafstein; Ólafur Jóhannesson; Geir Hallgrímsson; Ólafur Jóhannesson; Benedikt Sigurðsson Gröndal; Gunnar Thoroddsen |
| 3 | | Kristján Eldjárn (1916–1982) | 1 August 1968 | 31 July 1980 | 12 years (4,383 days) | 9 (1972)^{3} | Bjarni Benediktsson; Jóhann Hafstein; Ólafur Jóhannesson; Geir Hallgrímsson; Ólafur Jóhannesson; Benedikt Sigurðsson Gröndal; Gunnar Thoroddsen |
| 3 | | Kristján Eldjárn (1916–1982) | 1 August 1968 | 31 July 1980 | 12 years (4,383 days) | 10 (1976)^{3} | Bjarni Benediktsson; Jóhann Hafstein; Ólafur Jóhannesson; Geir Hallgrímsson; Ólafur Jóhannesson; Benedikt Sigurðsson Gröndal; Gunnar Thoroddsen |
| 3 | | Kristján Eldjárn (1916–1982) | At one point considered forming a government that did not rely on parliamentary support after leaders of the parliamentary parties had reached an impasse. | | | | |
| 4 | | Vigdís Finnbogadóttir (born 1930) | 1 August 1980 | 31 July 1996 | 16 years (5,844 days) | 11 (1980) | Gunnar Thoroddsen; Steingrímur Hermannsson; Þorsteinn Pálsson; Steingrímur Hermannsson; Davíð Oddsson |
| 4 | | Vigdís Finnbogadóttir (born 1930) | 1 August 1980 | 31 July 1996 | 16 years (5,844 days) | 12 (1984)^{3} | Gunnar Thoroddsen; Steingrímur Hermannsson; Þorsteinn Pálsson; Steingrímur Hermannsson; Davíð Oddsson |
| 4 | | Vigdís Finnbogadóttir (born 1930) | 1 August 1980 | 31 July 1996 | 16 years (5,844 days) | 13 (1988) | Gunnar Thoroddsen; Steingrímur Hermannsson; Þorsteinn Pálsson; Steingrímur Hermannsson; Davíð Oddsson |
| 4 | | Vigdís Finnbogadóttir (born 1930) | 1 August 1980 | 31 July 1996 | 16 years (5,844 days) | 14 (1992)^{3} | Gunnar Thoroddsen; Steingrímur Hermannsson; Þorsteinn Pálsson; Steingrímur Hermannsson; Davíð Oddsson |
| 4 | | Vigdís Finnbogadóttir (born 1930) | Was the world's first elected female president. Won first term in office with the lowest historical share of the votes for a first-term election (33.79%) but overwhelmingly won her third-term election in 1988. | | | | |
| 5 | | Ólafur Ragnar Grímsson (born 1943) | 1 August 1996 | 31 July 2016 | 20 years (7,305 days) | 15 (1996) | Davíð Oddsson; Halldór Ásgrímsson; Geir Haarde; Jóhanna Sigurðardóttir; Sigmundur Davíð Gunnlaugsson; Sigurður Ingi Jóhannsson |
| 5 | | Ólafur Ragnar Grímsson (born 1943) | 1 August 1996 | 31 July 2016 | 20 years (7,305 days) | 16 (2000)^{3} | Davíð Oddsson; Halldór Ásgrímsson; Geir Haarde; Jóhanna Sigurðardóttir; Sigmundur Davíð Gunnlaugsson; Sigurður Ingi Jóhannsson |
| 5 | | Ólafur Ragnar Grímsson (born 1943) | 1 August 1996 | 31 July 2016 | 20 years (7,305 days) | 17 (2004) | Davíð Oddsson; Halldór Ásgrímsson; Geir Haarde; Jóhanna Sigurðardóttir; Sigmundur Davíð Gunnlaugsson; Sigurður Ingi Jóhannsson |
| 5 | | Ólafur Ragnar Grímsson (born 1943) | 1 August 1996 | 31 July 2016 | 20 years (7,305 days) | 18 (2008)^{3} | Davíð Oddsson; Halldór Ásgrímsson; Geir Haarde; Jóhanna Sigurðardóttir; Sigmundur Davíð Gunnlaugsson; Sigurður Ingi Jóhannsson |
| 5 | | Ólafur Ragnar Grímsson (born 1943) | 1 August 1996 | 31 July 2016 | 20 years (7,305 days) | 19 (2012) | Davíð Oddsson; Halldór Ásgrímsson; Geir Haarde; Jóhanna Sigurðardóttir; Sigmundur Davíð Gunnlaugsson; Sigurður Ingi Jóhannsson |
| 5 | | Ólafur Ragnar Grímsson (born 1943) | First to use the constitutional veto power under Article 26 to deny signing a law from the Parliament. Used it again on two occasions. | | | | |
| 6 | | Guðni Thorlacius Jóhannesson (born 1968) | 1 August 2016 | 31 July 2024 | 8 years (2,921 days) | 20 (2016) | Sigurður Ingi Jóhannsson; Bjarni Benediktsson; Katrín Jakobsdóttir; Bjarni Benediktsson |
| 6 | | Guðni Thorlacius Jóhannesson (born 1968) | 1 August 2016 | 31 July 2024 | 8 years (2,921 days) | 21 (2020) | Sigurður Ingi Jóhannsson; Bjarni Benediktsson; Katrín Jakobsdóttir; Bjarni Benediktsson |
| 6 | | Guðni Thorlacius Jóhannesson (born 1968) | The youngest person to become President of Iceland, overwhelmingly won his second-term election in 2020. | | | | |
| 7 | | Halla Tómasdóttir (born 1968) | 1 August 2024 | Incumbent | 2 years, 58 days | 22 (2024) | Bjarni Benediktsson; Kristrún Frostadóttir |
| 7 | | Halla Tómasdóttir (born 1968) | Won with the second lowest historical share of the votes for a first-term election (34.15%). This was her second attempt at a presidential run, the first one having been in 2016 where she came in second. | | | | |

== See also ==
- List of rulers of Iceland
- List of spouses and partners of Icelandic presidents
