= Uncontested election =

Election in which all candidates are guaranteed to be elected

An uncontested election is an election in which the winning candidate did not face a serious challenger. This often entails the number of candidates being the same as or fewer than the number of places available for election, meaning that all candidates are guaranteed to be elected unless there are provisions provided for this. For example, in some election systems, absence of opposing candidates may not guarantee victory; possible factors are a quorum or minimum voter turnout; a none of the above option (effectively turning the election into a referendum on the candidate's election); or the availability of write-in candidates on the ballot. In some uncontested elections, the normal process of voters casting ballots and election official counting votes is cancelled as superfluous and costly; in other cases the election proceeds as a formality.

In liberal democracies, uncontested elections are a cause for concern because many understandings of democracy, such as that of Robert Dahl, rely on the idea of voters choosing among alternatives.

== Preventing automatic election ==
Running without opponents is not always a guarantee of winning.

Many elections require that the winner has not only the most votes of all candidates, but also either a minimum number of votes or minimum fraction of votes cast, which may apply if many voters cast blank votes or spoiled votes. If elections require a minimum voter turnout, then abstention may likewise invalidate the election and trigger a fresh election. Some elections allow a "none of the above" option for the same purpose, and some allow voters to add write-in candidates to the ballot, so the pre-printed candidate is not truly uncontested.

In the Philippines, the sole candidate in an uncontested election must have at least one vote in order to win the seat; an exception is on special elections, where the sole candidate is deemed elected, and the election is no longer held.

This is also true in general elections in the United States. There are cases in local government races where the sole candidate on the ballot finished with zero votes and thus have lost an uncontested election; this is because almost all U.S. government seats require candidates to reside in the municipality they seek to represent, and means the candidates themselves must, usually out of forgetfulness or lack of time on election day, fail to vote for themselves. In such cases, the other members of the body usually appoint someone to the vacant seat.

This does not apply in primary elections: if only one candidate qualifies for a party's nomination, the primary is scratched and the candidate is declared nominated.

== History ==
In liberal democracies like the United States, strong support for one candidate have resulted in uncontested elections. In the United States presidential elections of 1788-1789 and 1792, George Washington ran uncontested for President, though in the latter election the ballot for the Vice President was contested by both Federalists and Democratic-Republicans. In the 1820 election, James Monroe also ran unopposed, though New Hampshire elector William Plumer cast a vote for John Quincy Adams as a symbolic measure.

In parliamentary systems before the advent of modern parties, a significant proportion of seats were not contested. Adoption of single transferable vote in the Australian state of Tasmania (1909) and Ireland (1921) led to the end of uncontested seats, attributed to a lowered threshold for representation incentivising parties to field more candidates.

== Single-winner elections ==
An uncontested single-winner election may be termed a walkover, a term originating in horse racing. Election walkovers are called acclamation in Canada.

In dictatorial countries that hold elections, such as dominant-party and one-party states, elections for major state offices often involve a single candidate of the ruling party, occasionally with a "token" alternative candidate presented by a bloc party or the controlled opposition; however, the candidate of the ruling party is guaranteed to be elected even in those cases where token candidates do run against them. Some regimes, such as the Brazilian military regime and all communist states, decided to elect their major state offices indirectly to further reduce the already-slim possibility of an opposition victory, since it is easier to coerce a legislature or an electoral college into voting for the regime's candidate than to fake millions of fraudulent votes in a direct election; for example, the fascist Estado Novo regime in Portugal moved its presidential elections from a direct popular vote to an indirect election by the National Assembly, following opposition candidate Humberto Delgado's better-than-expected showing in the 1958 Portuguese presidential election.

More minor offices, such as the national legislature, are more varied; some regimes follow the pattern of a single candidate for each seat, while others allow an election between several candidates from the ruling party. The same regime may switch between these approaches depending on how much it has consolidated power: for example, when Malawi was under the one-party rule of the MCP between 1964 and 1994, parliamentary elections initially featured exactly one candidate for each seat handpicked by president Hastings Banda, but beginning in 1978 they featured a choice between multiple candidates, who nonetheless all had to swear allegiance to Banda.

In illiberal democracy, walkovers may be a suspicious sign of electoral fraud, or gerrymandering to prevent other candidates from participating.

In a two-party system, a walkover may be the sign of a very strong mandate or unanimous support. Sometimes an opposing party will nominate a paper candidate to provide nominal opposition, or the opposition boycotts the election and a ruling party supporter provides a paper opponent to prevent a walkover, as in four Northern Ireland by-elections in 1986.

Multi-party systems that have held uncontested presidential elections by popular vote include Algeria, Iceland, (Note: In 1945, 1949, 1956, 1960, 1964, 1976, 1984, 1992, 2000, and 2008.) Ireland, (Note: In 1938, 1952, 1974, 1976, 1983, and 2004.) Singapore, and Zimbabwe. The form an uncontested election can take depends on the country: in Ireland, Iceland, and Singapore, the single candidate is automatically declared elected without a vote, but in Austria, the election becomes a referendum on the single candidate's election.

=== Australia ===
The last uncontested election for the Australian House of Representatives occurred at the 1963 federal election, when Jock Nelson ran uncontested in the Northern Territory seat (then lacking full voting rights). The last uncontested by-election was the 1956 Cunningham by-election, while the 1955 federal election – called two years early – was the last to have uncontested elections in electorates with full voting rights.

=== Chile ===
A famous example of a single-candidate election is the 1988 Chilean presidential referendum, held in the latter stage of the military dictatorship. The ruling military junta was tasked with nominating the first president to serve under resumed civilian rule, who would be submitted for approval or rejection by the people; the military regime's leader, Augusto Pinochet, was nominated as the presidential candidate. The "No" side won with 56% of the vote, marking the end of Pinochet's 16 1/2-year rule, and multi-candidate presidential elections were held in 1989, alongside the already-scheduled parliamentary elections. The 1989 elections were won by the Concert of Parties for Democracy (Concertación), initially formed to coordinate the "No" campaign against Pinochet.

=== United Kingdom ===
In the Victorian era, over half of parliamentary seats at general elections to the UK House of Commons could go uncontested. The outgoing Speaker's constituency was traditionally not contested until the 1960s, as a symbol of the Speaker's political neutrality. Otherwise, the last uncontested Commons elections were in four Northern Ireland constituencies with large Ulster Unionist Party majorities, in the 1951 United Kingdom general election and ensuing by-elections; in Great Britain itself, the last uncontested parliamentary elections were Liverpool Scotland and Rhondda West in the 1945 general election. The last uncontested parliamentary election throughout the whole of the United Kingdom was the 1954 Armagh by-election. During the World Wars, several by-elections were uncontested, with the candidate of the outgoing MP's party winning by default. This was both a cost-saving emergency measure at a time of war coalition government, and a gesture of solidarity if the by-election was triggered by a war-related death. As for local council elections, 2018 was the first time there were no uncontested wards, though there is a year-on-year variation due to the rotating nature of local elections.

=== United States ===
In the United States, there has been a trend over time whereby uncontested seats in U.S. Congress have declined but uncontested seats in state legislatures has increased. A 2011 study found that state legislators who did not face competition in their past election are less active in law-making, showing up less often to vote.

=== Local elections ===
Local elections tend to have higher rates of uncontested elections. In Czechia, uncontested municipal races rose from 12% to 28% from 1998 to 2022 and found that uncontested elections had 18% lower turnout. Indonesia also noted a rise, with incumbency advantage a factor in dissuading rival candidates and parties from competing. One study found in Italian municipal elections, signature requirements for candidates increased the number of uncontested races. In Japan, 15 to 20% of prefectural elections from 2002 to 2021 were uncontested.

=== Non-party elections ===
In civic organisations and civic societies, where personal charisma and personal politics often dominate, while parties or factions are often interested in a seat, they may not contest a seat that is being held by a long-standing or very popular individual, for fear of being seen as "rocking the boat". In elections for these societies, there is often "pre-election politics" where candidates attempt to figure out who is running for which positions; in this cat and mouse game, elected positions are thus often effectively decided by internal politics before a single vote is cast.

40% of American school board elections were uncontested according to a 2020 study.

Multiple studies have examined uncontested board of directors elections.

== Multiple-winner elections ==
Irish town councils were elected from 1919 to 2009 by single transferable vote; in many cases the entire town formed a single nine-seat local electoral area. Where there were nine or fewer candidates, no election contest was held and all eligible candidates deemed elected without a vote. This happened in 1960 in three urban districts and six towns with commissioners.

Multi-member districts are associated with a reduction in uncontested races even if proportional representation is not used. This is because potential challengers may assume they have a higher chance of winning, or see the competing party as unlikely to win multiple seats in one contest.

Local councils in the Philippines are elected via plurality block voting; if there are fewer candidates than positions, the election still proceeds, and candidates still need at least one vote in order to be elected.

== See also ==
- Ballot access

== Bibliography ==
- Konisky, David M.; Ueda, Michiko (2011). "The Effects of Uncontested Elections on Legislator Performance". Legislative Studies Quarterly. 36 (2): 199–229. JSTOR 23053266.
- Sharman, Campbell (2003). "Uncontested Seats and the Evolution of Party Competition: The Australian Case". Party Politics. 9 (6): 679–702. doi:10.1177/13540688030096002.
