= The Woman at 1000 Degrees =

Historical novel by Hallgrímur Helgason, published in 2011

First edition (publ. JPV)

Konan við 1000°: Herbjörg María Björnsson segir frá ('The Woman at 1000°: As Told by Herbjörg María Björnsson') is a historical novel by Hallgrímur Helgason, published in Reykjavík in 2011 by JPV.

== Summary ==
Helgason's main character, Herra, is an eighty-year-old bedridden woman, living alone in a garage along with her laptop and an old German hand grenade from World War II. She has decided to die before Christmas, and has opted for a cremation (thus the thousand degrees). She even makes an appointment for herself at the local crematorium, and while she awaits her death, she recounts her turbulent life, that took her from her remote Icelandic childhood fjord over to Copenhagen before the war, then on to Germany of the war, back to Iceland, then to Argentina, and around the world.

Though based on a real life, the book is a clear work of fiction. Helgason uses fictional freedom to tell an incredible story, but builds his work around historical facts and uses the presidential figure of the grandfather to write about Iceland's destiny in the twentieth century. As the author did not change the name of the president, it was evident that he was writing about the Björnsson's family. This caused a stir in Iceland when the book was published. Some family members threatened to stop publication and tried to interfere when the book was nominated for the Nordic Council Literature Prize in 2013.

== Historical basis ==
The Thousand Degree Woman (in some countries titled The Woman at 1000°) is based on the real life of Brynhildur Georgía Björnsson, an Icelandic woman whom Helgason accidentally met over the telephone in 2006, when he was aiding his ex-wife during an election campaign, getting people to vote for the Social Democratic Party. Ms. Björnsson died in 2007 but had published her biography in 1983. Her father Björn Sveinsson Björnsson had also published his biography in 1988. He was one of a handful of Icelanders who fought with the Nazis in World War II. Brynhildur's grandfather was the first president of Iceland, Mr. Sveinn Björnsson.

== Translations ==
The novel was simultaneously published in German and has been translated to Danish, Norwegian, Polish, Romanian, Lithuanian, Russian, German, Italian, French, Catalan and English. In France the young translator Jean-Christophe Salaün was awarded the Prix de traduc-tion Pierre-François Caillé, for the best translated book of 2014. In Spain the website todolitera-tura.es picked the "La mujer a 1000º" as the best book of 2014.

- Kvinden ved 1000°: Herbjørg Maria Bjørnsson fortæller, trans. by Kim Lembek (Reykjavík: JPV útgáfa, 2012; København : Lindhardt og Ringhof, 2013) [Danish]
- La femme à 1000°, trans. by Jean-Christophe Salaun (s.l.: Presses de la cité, 2013) [French]
- Kobieta w 1000°C: na podstawie wspomnień Herbjorg Maríi Bjornsson, trans. by Alicja Rosenau (Kraków: Znak, 2013) [Polish]
- La mujer a 1000°, trans. by Enrique Bernárdez (Barcelona: Lumen, 2013) [Spanish]
- A nö 1000 fokon: Herbjörg María Björnsson története, trans. by Veronika Egyed (Budapest: Scolar, 2013) [Hungarian]
- La nonna a 1000°: Herbjörg María Björnsson racconta, trans. by Silvia Cosimini (Milano: Mondadori, 2014) [Italian]
- Een vrouw op 1000°: uit de memoires van Herbjörg Maria Björnsson, trans. by Marcel Otten (Utrecht: Uitgeverij De Arbeiderspers, 2014) [Dutch]
- Zhenstsjína prí 1000°C, trans. by Olgi Markelovoj (Moscow: Ast, 2015) [Russian]
- Gruaja në 1000°, trans. by Agim Doksani (Tiranë: Ombra, 2016)
- Kvinnen ved 1000°: Herbjörg María Björnsson forteller, trans. by Silje Beite Løken ([s.l.]: Cappelen Damm, 2016) [Norwegian]
- Woman at 1000 degrees, trans. by Brian FizGibbon (Chapel Hill: Algonquin books, 2018) [English]
- Eine Frau bei 1000°: aus den Memoiren der Herbjörg Maria Björnsson, trans. by Karl Ludwig Wetzig (Stuttgart: Klett-Cotta, no date) [German]
- Femeia la 1000°C, trans. by Ioana Miruna Voiculescu (Bucharest: ART, 2020) [Romanian]

== Adaptations ==
A stage-version written by the author (along with Una Thorleifsdottir and Simon Birgisson) ran at the National Theatre of Iceland, in Reykjavik, in the winter of 2014–15, winning the Icelandic Theatre Prize for "Best Play of the Year 2015". In Denmark, the actress Solbjørg Højfeldt created a one-woman monologue that was premiered in the spring of 2016 to critical acclaim.

== Reviews ==
- Soffía Auður Birgisdóttir, ' "[...] mörg eru sjálf þín, kona" ', Tímarit Máls og menningar, 73 (2) (2012), 137-143.
- Alda Björk Valdimarsdóttir, 'Hann lagði okkur í ræsið á hverri síðu: Ellefu líf og Konan við 1000°', Skírnir, 186 (spring 2012), 147-165
- "Woman at 1,000 Degrees". Publishers Weekly. October 30, 2017.
- Beech, Peter (November 16, 2018). "The Woman at 1,000 Degrees by Hallgrímur Helgason review – a blitzkrieg of a novel". The Guardian.
