= List of heads of state of Finland =

This is a list of heads of state of Finland. It covers the period from 1809, when Finland became an autonomous Grand Duchy under the Russian Empire, to the present-day Republic of Finland.

During the Russian imperial era, which lasted until the abdication of Nicholas II in 1917, the heads of state were the Russian emperors, who ruled Finland under the title of Grand Duke of Finland. Following the Russian Revolution and a brief transition period from 1918 to 1919—which included an unsuccessful attempt to establish a monarchy under a German prince and governance by two temporary regents—Finland adopted a republican constitution. Since 1919, the head of state has been the President of the Republic of Finland.

For the heads of state prior to 1809, when Finland was an integral part of the Kingdom of Sweden, see List of Swedish monarchs.

== Russian Empire (1809–1917) ==
Portrait	Grand Duke	Reign began	Reign ended	Death	Consort
	Alexander I	17 September 1809	1 December 1825		Elizabeth Alexeievna
	Alexander I	Became ruler of the Grand Duchy of Finland following the Treaty of Fredrikshamn in 1809.			
	Nicholas I	25 December 1825	2 March 1855		Alexandra Feodorovna
	Nicholas I	Brother of Alexander I			
	Alexander II	2 March 1855	13 March 1881		Maria Alexandrovna
	Alexander II	Son of Nicholas I			
	Alexander III	13 March 1881	1 November 1894		Maria Feodorovna
	Alexander III	Son of Alexander II			
	Nicholas II	1 November 1894	15 March 1917 (abdicated)	17 July 1918, Yekaterinburg (murdered)	Alexandra Feodorovna
	Nicholas II	Son of Alexander III. Abdicated during the February Revolution.			

== Interim period (1917–1919) ==
During the interregnum from the abdication of Nicholas II to the end of the Finnish Civil War in spring 1918, sovereignty in Finland was exercised by the Finnish Parliament and the Russian Provisional Government. After the October revolution, the Finnish Parliament declared itself the sole repository of supreme power on 15 November 1918. The declaration of independence was given a few days later. After the Civil War, a regent (Finnish: valtionhoitaja) was appointed by the parliament as a temporary head of state. Prince Frederick Charles of Hesse was elected as the King of Finland on 9 October 1918, but he never took office and renounced the throne on 14 December 1918.

=== Regents appointed by parliament ===
- 27 May 1918 – 12 December 1918 : Pehr Evind Svinhufvud
- 12 December 1918 – 26 July 1919 : Baron Carl Gustaf Emil Mannerheim

=== House of Hesse ===
Name	Portrait	Birth	Marriage(s)	Death	Claim
Fredrik Kaarle; 9 October 1918 – 14 December 1918 (67 days)	Frederik Kaarle	1868; Prussia Son of Frederick William, Landgrave of Hesse and Princess Anna of Prussia	Princess Margaret of Prussia; 1893; 6 children	28 May 1940; Kassel; Aged 72	King-elect of Finland

== List of presidents (1919–present) ==
National Progressive Party
Agrarian League
National Coalition Party/National Coalition
Social Democratic Party of Finland
independent

№.	Portrait	President (birth year – death year)	Elected	Took office	Left office	Political party (until election)	Birth day, place Death day, place
1.		Kaarlo Juho Ståhlberg (1865–1952)	1919	26 July 1919	2 March 1925	National Progressive Party	* 28 January 1865, Suomussalmi † 22 September 1952, Helsinki
1.		Kaarlo Juho Ståhlberg (1865–1952)	Member of parliament (1908–1910, 1914–1918 and 1930–1933). Speaker of parliament (1914–1917). President of the Supreme Administrative Court (1918–1919). Elected as president by the parliament in 1919.				
2.		Lauri Kristian Relander (1883–1942)	1925	2 March 1925	2 March 1931	Agrarian League	* 31 May 1883, Kurkijoki † 9 February 1942, Helsinki
2.		Lauri Kristian Relander (1883–1942)	Member of parliament (1910–1914 and 1917–1920). Speaker of parliament (1919–1920). Governor of Viipuri Province (1920–1925). Elected as president by an electoral college in 1925.				
3.		Pehr Evind Svinhufvud (1861–1944)	1931	2 March 1931	1 March 1937	National Coalition Party	* 15 December 1861, Sääksmäki † 29 February 1944, Luumäki
3.		Pehr Evind Svinhufvud (1861–1944)	Member of the Estate of Nobles in the Diet of Finland (1894 and 1899–1906). Member of parliament (1907–1917 and 1930–1931). Speaker of parliament (1907–1913). Regent (interim head of state) of Finland (1918). Prime Minister (1917–1918 and 1930–1931). Elected as president by an electoral college in 1931.				
4.		Kyösti Kallio (1873–1940)	1937	1 March 1937	19 December 1940 (died)	Agrarian League	* 10 April 1873, Ylivieska † 19 December 1940, Helsinki
4.		Kyösti Kallio (1873–1940)	Member of parliament (1907–1937). Chairman of the Agrarian League (1909–1917). Minister of Agriculture (1919–1920 and 1921–1922). Speaker of parliament (1920–1921, 1922, 1924–1925, 1927–1928, 1929 and 1930–1936). Prime Minister (1922–1924, 1925–1926, 1929–1930 and 1936–1937). Elected as president by an electoral college in 1937. Announced resignation in 1940 because of poor health, but died in office.				
5.		Risto Ryti (1889–1956)	1940; 1943	19 December 1940	4 August 1944 (resigned)	National Progressive Party	* 3 February 1889, Huittinen † 25 October 1956, Helsinki
5.		Risto Ryti (1889–1956)	Member of parliament (1919–1924 and 1927–1929). Minister of Finance (1921–1922 and 1922–1924). Governor of the Bank of Finland (1923–1940 and 1944–1945). Prime Minister (1939–1940). Elected as president by the electoral college from 1937 in 1940 and re-elected in 1943 also by the electoral college from 1937. Resigned in 1944 due to the Ryti–Ribbentrop Agreement.				
6.		Carl Gustaf Mannerheim (1867–1951)	1944	4 August 1944	11 March 1946 (resigned)	independent	* 4 June 1867, Askainen † 27 January 1951, Lausanne, Switzerland
6.		Carl Gustaf Mannerheim (1867–1951)	Regent (interim head of state) of Finland (1918–1919). Commander-in-Chief of the Finnish Defence Forces (1939–1945). The only Field Marshal and Marshal of Finland. Decreed as president in 1944 by an exception law. Resigned in 1946 because of poor health. Finland's only non-partisan president and the only president to die outside Finland.				
7.		Juho Kusti Paasikivi (1870–1956)	1946; 1950	11 March 1946	1 March 1956	National Coalition Party	* 27 November 1870, Koski Hl. † 14 December 1956, Helsinki
7.		Juho Kusti Paasikivi (1870–1956)	Member of parliament (1907–1909 and 1910–1914). Prime Minister (1918 and 1944–1946). Elected as president by the parliament in 1946 and re-elected by an electoral college in 1950.				
8.		Urho Kekkonen (1900–1986)	1956; 1962; 1968; 1978	1 March 1956	27 January 1982 (resigned)	Agrarian League	* 3 September 1900, Pielavesi † 31 August 1986, Helsinki
8.		Urho Kekkonen (1900–1986)	Member of parliament (1936–1956). Minister of Justice (1936–1937 and 1944–1946). Minister of the Interior (1937–1939 and 1950–1951). Speaker of parliament (1948–1950). Prime Minister (1950–1953 and 1954–1956). Elected as president by an electoral college in 1956 and re-elected in 1962, 1968 and 1978. In 1973, the term that started in 1968 was extended by four years by an exception law. Resigned in 1982 because of poor health. Served in the Finnish Civil War.				
9.		Mauno Koivisto (1923–2017)	1982; 1988	27 January 1982	1 March 1994	Social Democratic Party of Finland	* 25 November 1923, Turku † 12 May 2017, Helsinki
9.		Mauno Koivisto (1923–2017)	Minister of Finance (1966–1967 and 1972). Governor of the Bank of Finland (1968–1982). Prime Minister (1968–1970 and 1979–1982). Elected as president by an electoral college in 1982 and re-elected in 1988. The first president born in independent Finland. Served in the Continuation War of the Second World War.				
10.		Martti Ahtisaari (1937–2023)	1994	1 March 1994	1 March 2000	Social Democratic Party of Finland	* 23 June 1937, Viipuri † 16 October 2023, Helsinki
10.		Martti Ahtisaari (1937–2023)	Under-Secretary-General of the United Nations (1987–1991). Elected as president in 1994. The first president elected by direct popular vote. Nobel Peace Prize laureate 2008. Member of The Elders.				
11.		Tarja Halonen (b. 1943)	2000; 2006	1 March 2000	1 March 2012	Social Democratic Party of Finland	* 24 December 1943, Helsinki
11.		Tarja Halonen (b. 1943)	Member of parliament (1979–2000). Minister of Justice (1990–1991). Minister for Foreign Affairs (1995–2000). Elected as president in 2000 and re-elected in 2006. Finland's first female president.				
12.		Sauli Niinistö (b. 1948)	2012; 2018	1 March 2012	1 March 2024	National Coalition	* 24 August 1948, Salo
12.		Sauli Niinistö (b. 1948)	Member of parliament (1987–2003 and 2007–2011). Chairman of the National Coalition Party (1994–2001). Minister of Justice (1995–1996). Minister of Finance (1996–2003). Speaker of parliament (2007–2011). Elected as president in 2012 and re-elected in 2018.				
13.		Alexander Stubb (b. 1968)	2024	1 March 2024	Incumbent	National Coalition	* 1 April 1968, Helsinki
13.		Alexander Stubb (b. 1968)	Member of the European Parliament (2004–2008). Member of parliament (2011–2017). Minister for Foreign Affairs (2008–2011). Minister for European Affairs and Trade (2011–2014). Prime Minister (2014–2015). Chairman of the National Coalition Party (2014–2016). Minister of Finance (2015–2016). Elected as president in 2024.				

== See also ==
- Ancient kings of Finland
- Duke of Finland
- Governor-General of Finland
- List of monarchs of Denmark
- List of Greenlandic rulers
- List of monarchs of Norway
- Lists of heads of state of Iceland
- List of Russian monarchs
- List of Swedish governors-general
- List of monarchs of Sweden
- Monarchy of Finland
- President of Finland
- Prime Minister of Finland
