= 1952 presidential election =

The 1952 presidential election may refer to:

- 1952 Chilean presidential election
- 1952 Icelandic presidential election
- 1952 Indian presidential election
- 1952 Irish presidential election
- 1952 Israeli presidential election
- 1952 South Korean presidential election
- 1952 United States presidential election
