= 1944 Icelandic presidential election =

Presidential election in Iceland

17 June 1944	1945 →

Majority of the 52 Althing votes required
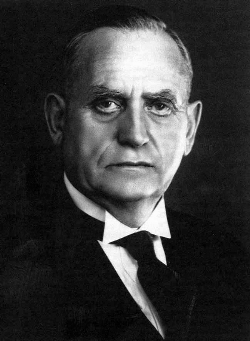

Nominee	Sveinn Björnsson	Jón Sigurðsson
Electoral vote	30	5
Percentage	85.71%	14.29%
Nominators	Social Democratic, Progressive
Regent before election
Sveinn Björnsson
Elected President
Sveinn Björnsson

Indirect presidential elections were held in Iceland on 17 June 1944 following the approval of a new constitution and the transition of the country to a republic the previous month. Sveinn Björnsson was elected and appointed by the Parliament for a one-year term.

== Results ==
Candidate	Party	Votes	%
Sveinn Björnsson	Independent	30	85.71
Jón Sigurðsson	Independent	5	14.29
Total		35	100.00
Valid votes		35	70.00
Invalid/blank votes		15	30.00
Total votes		50	100.00
Registered voters/turnout		52	96.15
Source: Kjarninn
