= 1960 presidential election =

1960 presidential election may refer to:

- 1960 Bolivian general election
- 1960 Brazilian presidential election
- 1960 Ghanaian presidential election
- 1960 Icelandic presidential election
- March 1960 South Korean presidential election
- August 1960 South Korean presidential election
- 1960 United States presidential election
