= 1976 presidential election =

1976 presidential election may refer to:

- 1976 Algerian presidential election
- 1976 Icelandic presidential election
- 1976 Irish presidential election
- 1976 Portuguese presidential election
- 1976 United States presidential election
