= Danish–Icelandic Act of Union =

Act of 1 December 1918 putting Iceland into personal union with Denmark

The Danish–Icelandic Act of Union, an agreement signed by Iceland and Denmark on 1 December 1918, recognized Iceland as a fully independent and sovereign state, known as the Kingdom of Iceland, which was freely associated to Denmark in a personal union with the Danish king. Iceland established its own flag, declared its neutrality and asked Denmark to represent on its behalf foreign affairs and defense interests, while maintaining full control of them. Iceland opened its first embassy in 1920. The Act would be up for revision in 1940 and could be revoked three years later if agreement was not reached.

== Background ==
While a few prominent Icelanders, such as Benedikt Sveinsson, wanted to also sever the personal union with the Danish king, the Icelanders did not seriously pursue it. It was understood that the Danish king would not use the veto powers afforded to him by the Act of Union, and the Icelanders considered it unnecessary to sever all ties with Denmark, having gained their independence and full control of all state affairs.

Historian Gunnar Karlsson argues that Denmark was willing to grant Iceland sovereignty in 1918 for two reasons. First, the self-determination of peoples had grown in importance with the end of World War I. Second, Iceland had shown that it was capable of governing its own affairs (starting with Home Rule in 1904) and relations with other states (during World War I when Iceland was cut off from Denmark).

== Founding of the Republic ==
On 17 June 1944, during the occupation of Denmark by Nazi Germany, while the armed forces of the United States, the United Kingdom and Canada were still occupying Iceland, a referendum was held on severing ties with the monarchy and the country voted overwhelmingly to become a republic.
