= List of Greenlandic rulers =

This is a list of the rulers of Greenland:

- The Norse Colony of Greenland (982–1261)
- The Kingdom of Norway (1261–1814)
  - The personal union of Norway and Sweden (1319–1343)
  - The personal union of Norway and Denmark (1380–1385)
  - The personal union of Norway, Sweden and Denmark (1385–1387)
  - The Kalmar Union (1397–1523)
  - The personal union of Norway and Denmark (1523–1814)
- The Kingdom of Denmark (1814–present)
  - The Home Rule of Greenland (since 1979)

== Part of the Kingdom of Norway, from 1261 to 1814 ==
Greenland as an integral part of Norway under the Monarchy of Norway

From the 1260s, the Norse colony on Greenland recognised the King of Norway as their overlord. Norway entered into a personal union with Denmark in 1380 and from 1397 was part of the Kalmar Union. From 1536, after Sweden had broken out of the union, Norway entered into a closer dependency with Denmark in the kingdom of Denmark–Norway, which existed until 1814. From the Middle Ages up until 1814, official Danish documents made clear that Greenland was a part of Norway.

=== House of Sverre ===
- 1261–1263 : Haakon IV Haakonsson
- 1263–1280 : Magnus VI Haakonsson
- 1280–1299 : Eric II Magnusson
- 1299–1319 : Haakon V Magnusson

=== House of Bjälbo ===
- 1319–1343 : Magnus VII Eriksson
- 1343–1380 : Haakon VI Magnusson
- 1380–1387 : Olaf IV Haakonsson

=== House of Estridsen ===
- 1387–1412 : Margaret I

=== House of Griffins ===
- 1412–1442 : Eric of Pomerania

=== House of Palatinate-Neumarkt ===
- 1442–1448 : Christopher of Bavaria

=== House of Bonde ===
- 1449–1450 : Charles I

=== House of Oldenburg ===
- 1450–1481 : Christian I
- 1481–1513 : John I
- 1513–1523 : Christian II
- 1523–1533 : Frederick I
- 1534–1559 : Christian III
- 1559–1588 : Frederick II
- 1588–1648 : Christian IV
- 1648–1670 : Frederick III
- 1670–1699 : Christian V
- 1699–1730 : Frederick IV
- 1730–1746 : Christian VI
- 1746–1766 : Frederick V
- 1766–1808 : Christian VII
- 1808–1814 : Frederick VI

== Part of the Kingdom of Denmark, from 1814 to the present ==
Greenland as a dependency of the Kingdom of Denmark

In 1814, Denmark-Norway found itself on the losing side of the Napoleonic Wars. In gratitude to Sweden for its assistance in defeating Napoleon (and as a consolation for the recent loss of Finland to Russia), mainland Norway and certain Norwegian territories were transferred to Sweden – thus, the personal union of Norway and Denmark ended. The dependencies of Greenland, Iceland and the Faroe Islands, however, remained part of the reorganised Kingdom of Denmark. Unlike Iceland, which was recognised as a sovereign monarchy united with Denmark under the same monarch in 1918, Greenland has remained a Danish dependency, currently under the reigning monarch Frederik X of Denmark.

=== House of Oldenburg ===
- 1814–1839 : Frederick VI
- 1839–1848 : Christian VIII
- 1848–1863 : Frederick VII

=== House of Glücksburg ===
- 1863–1906 : Christian IX
- 1906–1912 : Frederik VIII
- 1912–1947 : Christian X
- 1947–1972 : Frederik IX
- 1972–2024 : Margrethe II
- 2024–Present : Frederik X

== See also ==
- List of inspectors of Greenland
- List of governors of Greenland
- List of prime ministers of Greenland
- Norse colonization of the Americas
- Danish colonization of the Americas
- Erik the Red's Land
- History of Greenland
- Politics of Greenland
- List of rulers of Iceland
