= Ancient kings of Finland =

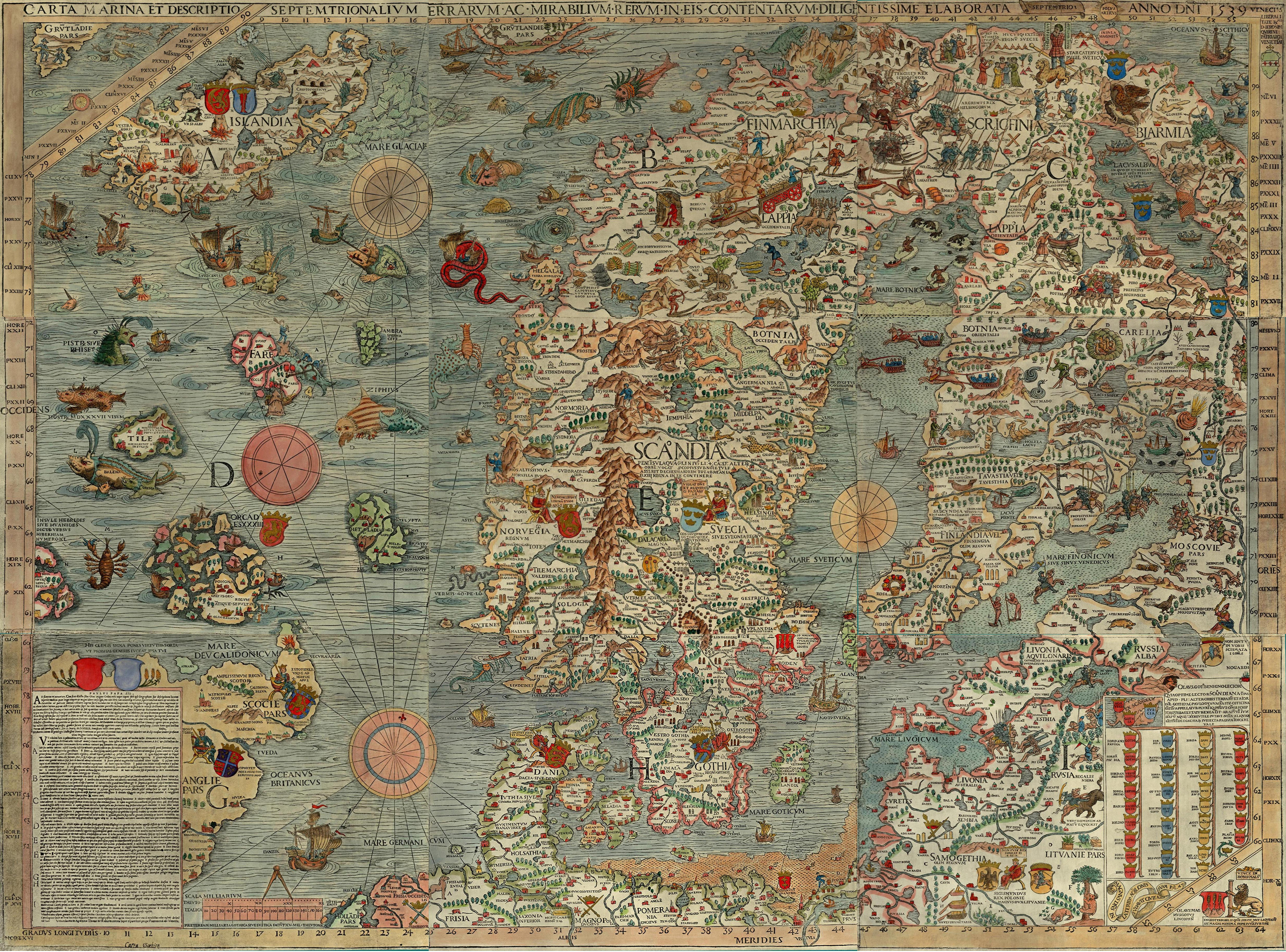
The Carta marina, designed by the Swedish historian and cartographer Olaus Magnus in 1539, mentions around Southwestern Finland the Latin phrase Finlandia vel Finningia olim regnum, meaning "The ancient monarchy of Finland or Finningia".

Ancient kings of Finland are legendary rulers associated with Finland in early literary sources. While a handful of medieval texts from Scandinavia, England, and the Islamic world mention figures described as kings of Finns, Finland or Kvenland, the descriptions are generally vague, and there is no archaeological evidence for the existence of a historical, unified monarchy in Iron Age or early medieval Finland. Instead, archaeological findings indicate a decentralized society organized around local chiefdoms and regional power centers.

The interpretation of literary sources is complicated by the use of the Old Norse term finnar, which often referred to the Sámi rather than the Finnic peoples. As a result, references to "kings of the Finns" (Finnakonungar) in saga literature likely refer to powerful Sámi leaders rather than rulers of a Finnish kingdom.

The idea of ancient Finnish kings gained prominence during the 17th century, when Gothicist scholars of the Swedish Empire, such as Johannes Messenius, sought to construct a prestigious past for the eastern provinces of the realm. In the 19th and 20th centuries, Finnish nationalist historians reinterpreted these narratives to support the development of a distinct national identity, often by inventing a heroic or glorious past. In contemporary times, the theme has been embraced by pseudohistorical writers and online communities.

== Literal sources ==
Most of the literal material concerning ancient kings of Finland comes from Norway, Iceland and Denmark. The earliest source mentioning a possible "king of Finland", however, is the Old English poem Widsith, written in the 6th or 7th century. The poem states "Casere weold Creacum ond Cælic Finnum" ("Casere rules over the Greek and Cælic over the Finns"). While Cælic has been interpreted as a reference to the Finnish mythological figure Kaleva, this identification is uncertain. Mikko Heikkilä has argued that a derivation from Kaleva is phonologically unlikely, suggesting instead an origin from the Proto-Sámi word *kǡllek.

The geographer al-Idrisi born in the realm of the Almoravid dynasty mentions in his 1154 book Tabula Rogeriana lands called Fymark and Tabast, which could possibly refer to Finland Proper and Tavastia. According to al-Idrisi, the king of Fymark owned lands around the Arctic Sea. According to Jalmari Jaakkola, this would mean wilderness lands in the north owned by people coming from Upper Satakunta (Pirkanmaa). However, al-Idrisi's description of Northern Europe is confusing and contains obvious misunderstandings.

The Egil's Saga from approximately the 13th century mentions the people of Kvenland led by their king Faravid waging war against the Karelians. According to the saga Faravid, commanding an army of 300 men, allied with the Norwegian chief Thorolf. The allies waged war on Karelia and made a great victory. Faravid is an Old Norse name, but as no such name is known among the Scandinavians, it has been interpreted as a translation of a Finnish name similar to "Kaukomieli" (literally "far-mind") or "Kaukamoinen". In the saga description, Faravid is placed in a context in the 9th century, but according to Kyösti Julku and Mikko Häme this point of time would be too early considering the attack of the Karelians mentioned in the saga. According to them, a more probable alternative for the century of Faravid's lifetime would be the 12th century.

Among the best known mythical ancient Finnish kings is Fornjótr, who is mentioned in the Orkneyinga saga written in the 13th century. Fornjótr is described as a king who ruled over "Finnland and Kvenland". Fornjótr's son Nórr is described as the founder of Norway and king Harald Fairhair as his distant descendant.

The historian Saxo Grammaticus repeatedly describes Finland and the Finns in his book Gesta Danorum about Danish history. Of the Finnish kings he mentions Sumblum and Gusonis, who is also the king of Bjarmaland. In these writings, the Finnish kings are mentioned when their daughters are courted. The historical reliability of Saxo's writings, among that of other early historical sources, is questionable.

Some other sources also mention the concept of a "king of Finland". For example the Edda poem The song of Völundr the mythical smith Völundr is mentioned as both the son of a Finnish king and a king of elves. Saxo Grammaticus's Gesta Danorum mentions that the Danish king Ragnar had waged war against the king of Finland.

In 1340, 25 peasants from Sääksmäki were excommunicated for failing to pay taxes. A list of these peasants remains, which mentions a person called Cuningas de Rapalum, meaning "King of Rapola". The name refers to an ancient Tavastian chief tradition. "Kuningas" (Finnish for "king") is known in many medieval contexts as a personal or vocative name, and it is very probably such a name in this context too and not a title. The name has most probably referred to a local chief, the master of a mansion. According to Georg Haggrén, the "King of Rapola" was, like the other excommunicated peasants from Sääksmäki, a member of a council, one of the most prestigious trusted men in the village.

In 1438, the peasant David from Satakunta declared himself as "the king of the peasants" during the David rebellion. Also other middle European rebel leaders in late medieval times declared themselves as kings without requiring a monarchical kingship as such. In compound words such as "nuottakuningas" or "huuhtakuningas", which were still in use in the 19th and 20th centuries, the term "kuningas" has referred to labour leaders selected from peasant labour forces. Kristfried Ganander mentions a Finnish king named Tuisko in his book Mythologia Fennica from 1789.

== Archaeological sources ==
There is so far no archaeological or historical evidence about any ancient settlements in Finland larger or more tightly organised than villages. According to archaeological sources, there was no strong political organisation comparable to monarchies in the Finland area during the Iron Age, but some chiefs might have briefly held power over large areas. It is probable that during the Iron Age, the people living in what is now Finland called their elected chiefs, men with inherited power, or other prestigious persons with the term kuningas ('king'), an old Finnic word deriving from the ancient Germanic word kuningaz. According to Jouko Vahtola, if there have been men of power called kuningas in the area which is now Finland, they were most probably family leaders of local communities, chiefs of tax or military raids or leaders of common enterprises.

During the Viking Age, of the areas around Finland, Denmark, Norway and Sweden (particularly the Mälaren area) started to form into monarchies, where power was consolidated into the hands of one nobleman. According to archaeological sources, there was also political organisation in Finland, particularly from the Vendel Period to the Crusade Period, but it is difficult to archaeologically estimate the exact nature of the organisation. According to jewellery worn by women, cultural regions during the Crusade Period or Finnish tribes can be divided into the cultural regions of the Finns proper, the Tavastians and the Savonians and the Karelians. The spread of different kinds of buckles has been seen to refer to expressing "Finnish", "Tavastian" and "Karelian" identities. Most probably the area around Finland resembled Iron-Age Gotland, Iceland or Jämtland in Northern Sweden, where power was held by local leaders competing with each other. These communities had a common court and decisive system. In Southern Finland these could have been represented with local courts.

The spread of valuable findings of weapons and jewellery into Southwestern Finland and Southern Ostrobothnia and valuable burials and cremations in these regions has been interpreted as the formation of an upper class since the Lower Roman Iron Age (0 - 400 CE). The Soukainen mass grave in Laitila from the 3rd century has been mentioned as an early example of a grave of a local "prince" or "king". A greater number of these graves is known from the Vendel Period, such as the graves in Pappilanmäki in Eura, in Pukkila in Isokyrö and in Kaavontonkä in Vähäkyrö. A tool found from a grave in Käräjänmäki in Eura from the late 6th century has been interpreted as referring to the high rank of the buried person. A similar tool found from the Sutton Hoo ship burial has been interpreted as a regal sceptre. Finland underwent a development that could have formed a contiguous monarchy given enough time. The development slowed down when the western parts of Finland were joined as part of the influence region of Svealand and Götaland from the 13th century. According to the Norwegian archeologist Björn Myhre, there were chiefdoms and "minor monarchies" in Iron-Age Finland.

There have also been theories of the existence of local defence organisations in Finland based on hillforts, particularly in Tavastia and Satakunta. These theories have been criticised by Jussi-Pekka Taavitsainen. Most modern historians believe the theory concerning the hillfort chain in Tavastia to be sound. Modern research mostly sees ancient hillforts as evidence of unorganised communities whose warfare was based on short raids and defence from such. The hillforts were not suitable for long sieges.

== List of ancient kings of Finland ==
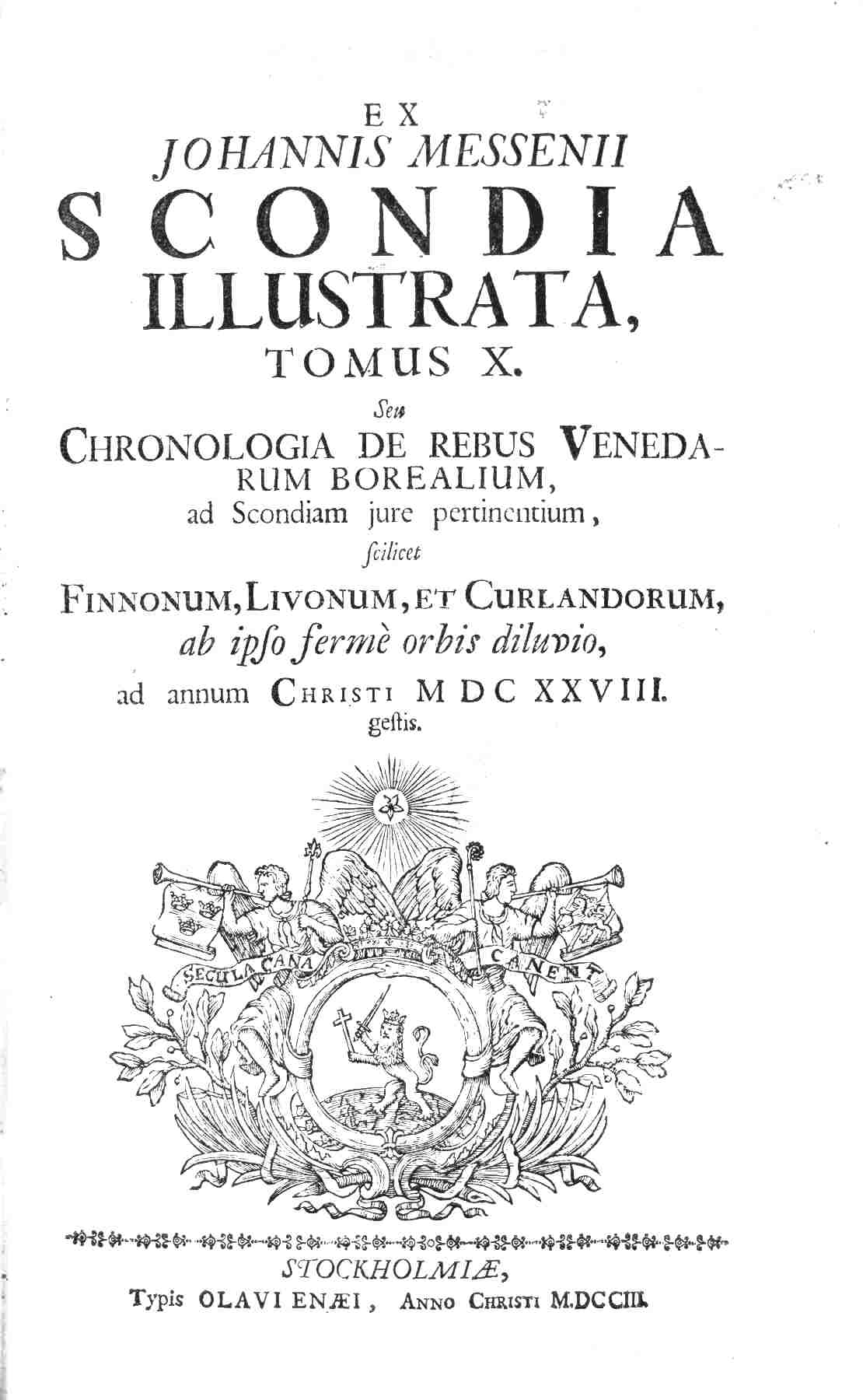
The book written by Johannes Messenius in the Kajaani Castle prison from 1616 to 1636 described the history of Sweden and its mythological kings. The book represents Gothicist historical writing.

Name according to original source	Description	Period	Source	Date of source
Cælic	"Ruler of Finland"	6th and 7th centuries	Widsith	6th and 7th centuries
Fiðr	"King of Finland"	9th century	Hálfdanar saga Eysteinssonar	14th century
Flóki	"King of Finland"	9th century	Hálfdanar saga Eysteinssonar	14th century
Grímr	"Ruler of Karjalanpohja"	9th century	Hálfdanar saga Eysteinssonar	14th century
Fravið	"King of Kvenland"	Middle 9th to 11th century	Egil's Saga	Middle 13th century
Fornjótr	"Ruler of Gotland, Kvenland and Finland"	9th to 12th century	Orkneyinga saga	
Sumblum	"King of Finland"	-	Gesta Danorum	13th century
Mottul	"Mottul finnakonungr"	9th and 10th centuries	Landnámabók	13th century
Gusonis	"King of Finland and Bjarmaland"	-	Gesta Danorum	13th century
Tuisko	"Finnish king"	-	Mythologia Fennica	1789

== Sources ==
- Gallén, Jarl: Länsieurooppalaiset ja skandinaaviset Suomen esihistoriaa koskevat lähteet. In: Suomen väestön esihistorialliset juuret, pp. 249–263. Title: Tvärminnen symposiumi 17.–19.1.1980. Bidrag till kännedom av Finlands natur och folk h. 131. Helsinki: Societas Scientiarum Fennica, 1984. ISBN 951-653-124-5.
- Hiekkanen, Markus: Suomen keskiajan kivikirkot, p. 14. Suomalaisen Kirjallisuuden Seuran toimituksia 1117. Helsinki: Suomalaisen Kirjallisuuden Seura, 2007. ISBN 978-951-746-861-9.
- Häme, Mikko: Saagoista ja muinaisista kuninkaistamme. Faravid 15. Pohjois-Suomen historiallisen yhdistyksen vuosikirja. Oulu 1991
- Lahtonen, Irmeli: A Land Beyond Seas and Mountains: A Study of References to Finland in Anglo-Saxon Sources. Suomen varhaishistoria. Tornion kongressi 14.–16.6.1991. (edited by Kyösti Julku). Studia historica septentrionalia 21. Rovaniemi; Pohjois-Suomen Historiallinen Yhdistys 1992: pp. 641–651.
- Messenius, Johannes: Suomen, Liivinmaan ja Kuurinmaan vaiheita and Suomen kronikka by unknown. Edited and explained by Martti Linna. Suomalaisen Kirjallisuuden Seuran Toimituksia. Helsinki 1988.
- Raninen, Sami & Wessman, Anna: Rautakausi. In: Haggrén, Georg; Halinen, Petri; Lavento, Mika; Raninen, Sami & Wessman, Anna (ed.): Muinaisuutemme jäljet. Suomen esi- ja varhaishistoria kivikaudelta keskiajalle., pp. 213–365. Helsinki: Gaudeamus, 2015. ISBN 978-951-746-861-9.
