= 1992 Icelandic presidential election =

← 1988	1992	1996 →
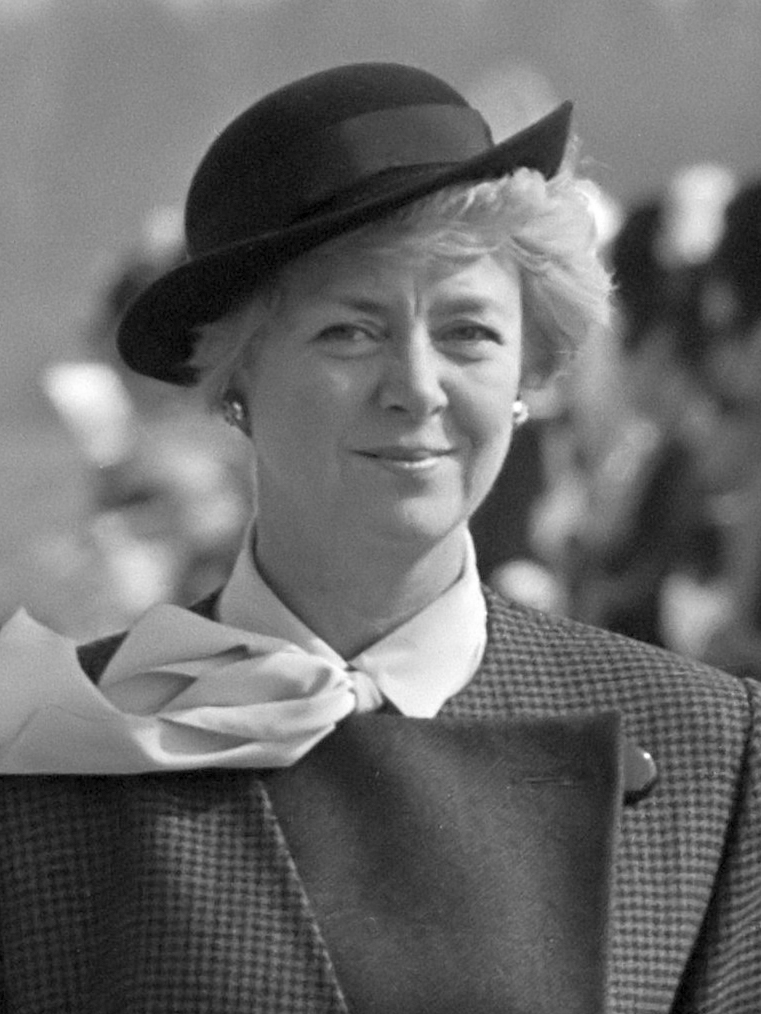
Candidate	Vigdís Finnbogadóttir
Popular vote	Unopposed
President before election
Vigdís Finnbogadóttir
Elected President
Vigdís Finnbogadóttir

Presidential elections were scheduled to be held in Iceland in 1992. However, incumbent president Vigdís Finnbogadóttir was the only candidate and the election was uncontested.
