= 1945 Icelandic presidential election =

← 1944	1945	1949 →
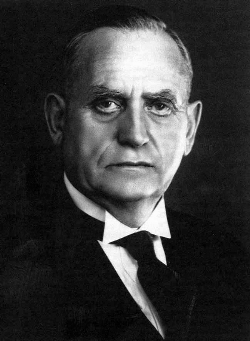
Nominee	Sveinn Björnsson
Party	Independent
Popular vote	Unopposed
President before election
Sveinn Björnsson
Elected President
Sveinn Björnsson

Presidential elections were scheduled to be held in Iceland in 1945. However, incumbent President Sveinn Björnsson was the only candidate, and the election was uncontested.
