= 1944 Icelandic constitutional referendum =

A constitutional referendum was held in Iceland between 20 and 23 May 1944. The 1918 Danish–Icelandic Act of Union declared Iceland to be a sovereign state separate from Denmark, but maintained the two countries in a personal union, with the king of Denmark also being the king of Iceland. In the two-part referendum, voters were asked whether the union with Denmark should be abolished, and whether to adopt a new republican constitution. Both measures were approved, each with more than 98% of valid votes in favour. Including invalid ballots, voter turnout was 98% overall, and 100% in two constituencies: Seyðisfjörður and Vestur-Skaftafjellssýsla.

== Results ==
Question	For		Against		Invalid/ blank	Total votes	Registered voters	Turnout	Result
Question	Votes	%	Votes	%	Invalid/ blank	Total votes	Registered voters	Turnout	Result
Abolition of the Act of Union	71,122	99.47	377	0.53	1,559	73,058	74,272	98.37	Approved
New constitution	69,435	98.51	1,051	1.49	2,572	73,058	74,272	98.37	Approved
Source: Nohlen & Stöver

== Aftermath ==
The union with Denmark was dissolved on 17 June 1944.

The republican celebration was held at Þingvellir on 17 June 1944. At 13:30, Prime Minister Björn Þórðarson set the celebrations going, after which a religious ceremony was held. The Icelandic flag was raised and the members of the parliament rose from their seats as church bells rang. All declared unilaterally that Iceland would henceforth be a republic. The members of parliament then chose Sveinn Björnsson as the first president. Sveinn had been regent of Iceland and the king's representative during the war years. He was the only president not elected directly by the people of Iceland.

== See also ==
- Iceland during World War II
