= Björn Sveinsson Björnsson =

Son of Sveinn Björnsson - Iceland first president

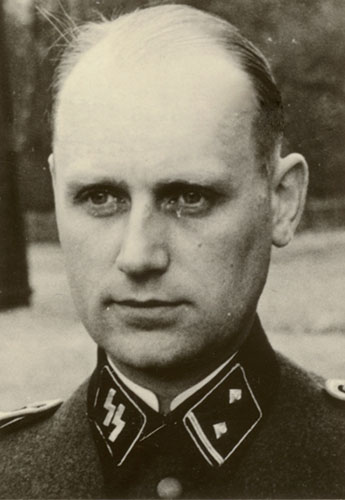
- Björn as SS-Standartenoberjunker, 1943

Personal details
- Born: 15 October 1909 Reykjavík, Iceland
- Died: 14 April 1998 (aged 88) Borgarnes, Iceland
- Party: National Socialist German Workers' Party
- Parents: Sveinn Björnsson (father); Georgia Björnsson (mother)
- Education: Menntaskóli
- Awards: Iron Cross 2nd class

Military service
- Allegiance: Nazi Germany
- Branch/service: Waffen-SS
- Years of service: 1941–1945
- Rank: Untersturmführer
- Unit: 5th SS Panzer Division Wiking; SS-Standarte Kurt Eggers
- Battles/wars: World War II: Eastern Front; occupied Denmark

Björn Sveinsson Björnsson (15 October 1909 – 14 April 1998) was the son of Iceland's first president Sveinn Björnsson and was one of about twenty Icelanders who fought for the Nazi regime during World War II.

== Early life ==
Björn graduated from Menntaskóli in Reykjavik in the spring of 1930. He then traveled to Germany and began to work at Eimskip in Hamburg. He had planned to study music, but his fiancée María was expecting a child, so he had to work. She and Björn married between 1930 and 1936. In the following years Björn and María had two daughters: Hjördís and Brynhildur Georgía, but they divorced in 1937.

== World War II ==
When the Nazi Party rose to power in Germany, Björn was very impressed by their politics, and when World War II broke out Björn applied to join the Waffen-SS in September 1941. Björn was stated to be an enthusiastic Nazi, even writing on his application "I certify that I am of pure Aryan stock. Heil Hitler!" Björn was a soldier in the 5th SS Panzer Division Wiking, and later in SS-Standarte Kurt Eggers where he served on the Eastern Front in Ukraine in the early stages of the German invasion of the Soviet Union as a soldier transporting weapons, people and food in muddy and snowy terrain, and in later stages in the war in Caucasus as a correspondent. Björn would regularly broadcast about the war to Iceland on the front lines. Only one of his recordings has survived, in which he interviews two supposed Cossack farmers about the evils of the Soviet Union. It was played for Icelandic audiences to portray Nazi Germany, not as an aggressor, but as a saviour of people from the Bolsheviks.

Upon being promoted to Unterscharführer in 1941, Björn was sent to an officer school in Bad Tölz. After his exam, he was sent to occupied Denmark to work in the German propaganda department in Copenhagen, publishing German propaganda in newspapers and radio broadcasts. He also published a magazine called Daggry which was a translated version of a magazine published by the SS. Björn had a ten-day period where he would talk on the radio, which made him fairly famous in Denmark. He stated that the Danish resistance movement was hunting him. Late in the war he received the Iron Cross 2nd class.

== Later life ==
When Germany surrendered in May 1945, the Danish partisans arrested or killed the remaining SS troops in the country. Björn was taken prisoner and held captive for over a year. He was suddenly released in the winter of 1946. A theory goes on that Georgia Björnsson, Björn's mother, pleaded King Christian X to show her son leniency. Björn went secretly to Sweden, from where he was smuggled back to Iceland. In Iceland, Björn was not received very well. The poet and author Halldór Laxness even stated that Björn was "one of the worst Icelandic men who ever existed". Björn built a house in Kópavogur and married the singer Nanna Egilsdóttir. In 1949, Björn, like many other Nazis, traveled to Argentina, along with Nanna, but they did not prosper there, so a couple of years later they moved back to Iceland, where Björn gained work at Keflavík International Airport. Björn and Nanna then moved to Germany where Björn worked with the United States Army alongside some other commercial jobs. In 1962 Björn got work as an agent for Encyclopedia Britannica. Towards the end of his work life, Björn worked as a guide in Iceland, specialising in German tourists. Björn spent the last year of his life in the town of Borgarnes.

Björn's memoirs were published in Reykjavík in 1989 as Ævi mín og sagan sem ekki mátti segja: Endurminningar Björns Sv. Björnssonar ("My life and the story that could not be told: recollections of Björn Sv. Björnsson").

Björn died in the spring of 1998 of natural causes.
