= 1984 Icelandic presidential election =

← 1980	1984	1988 →
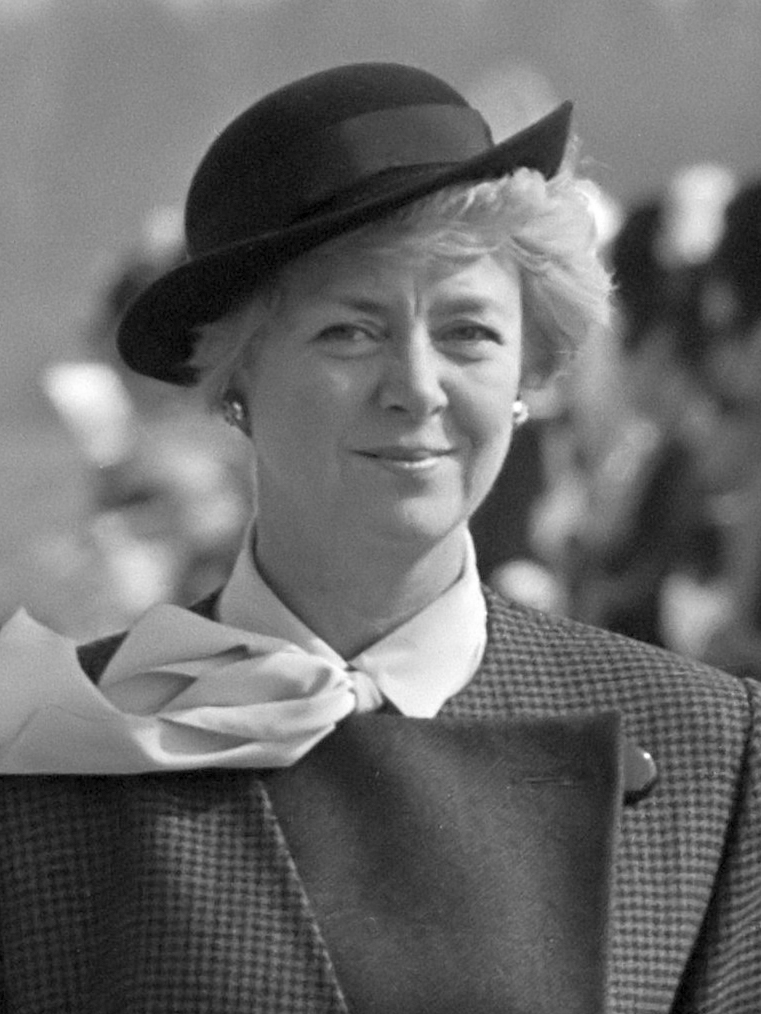
Nominee	Vigdís Finnbogadóttir
Popular vote	Unopposed
President before election
Vigdís Finnbogadóttir
Elected President
Vigdís Finnbogadóttir

Presidential elections were scheduled to be held in Iceland in 1984. However, incumbent president Vigdís Finnbogadóttir was the only candidate and the election was uncontested.
