= 1972 Icelandic presidential election =

← 1968	1972	1976 →
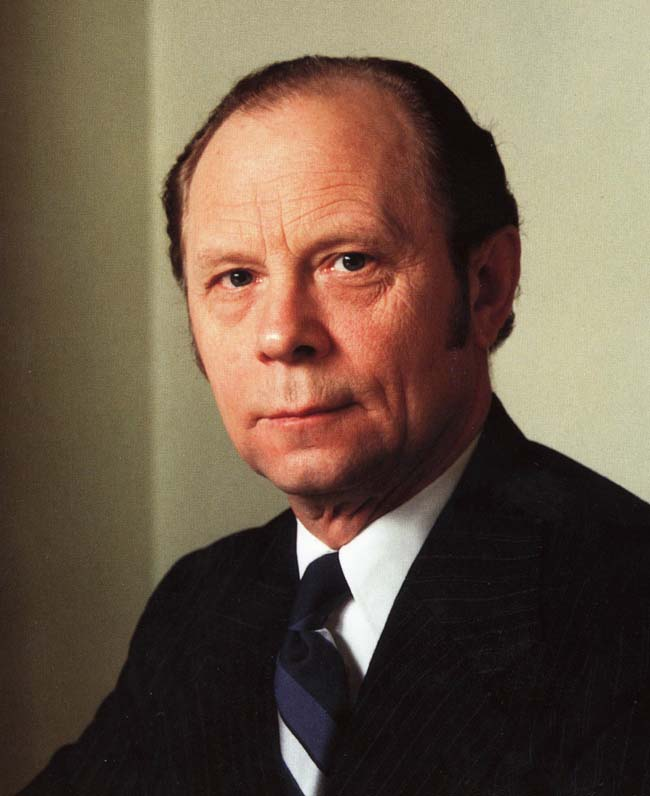
Nominee	Kristján Eldjárn
Popular vote	Unopposed
President before election
Kristján Eldjárn
Elected President
Kristján Eldjárn

Presidential elections were scheduled to be held in Iceland in 1972. However, incumbent president Kristján Eldjárn was the only candidate and the election was uncontested.
