= 1988 Icelandic presidential election =

← 1984	25 June 1988	1992 →
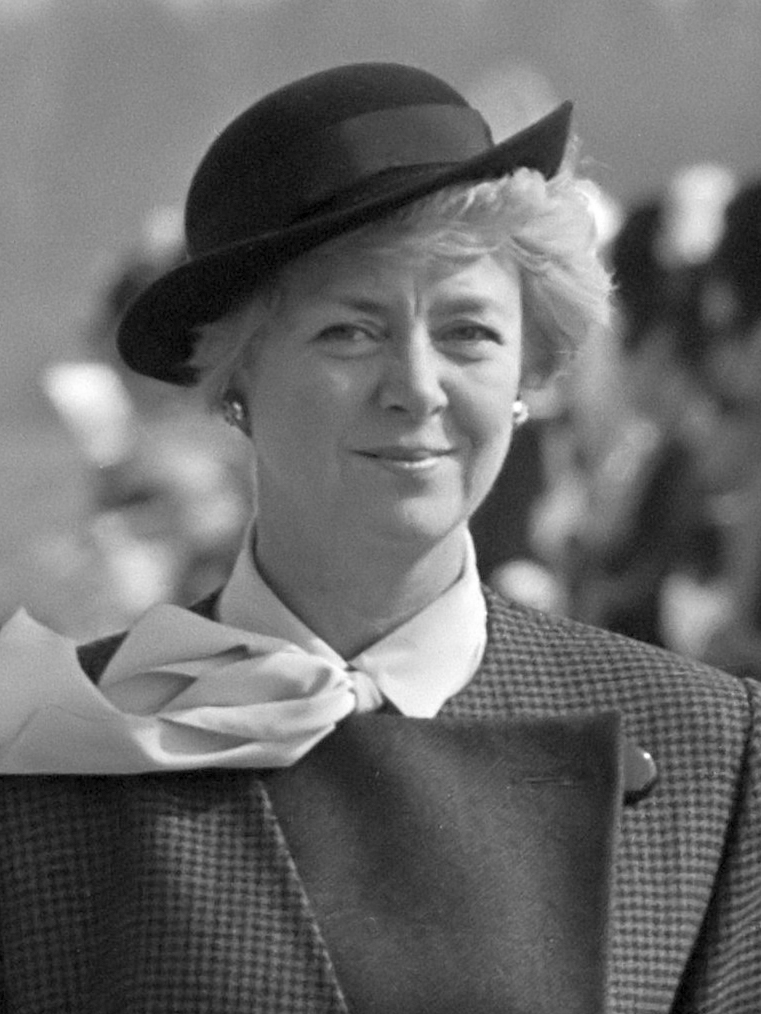

Candidate	Vigdís Finnbogadóttir	Sigrún Þorsteinsdóttir
Popular vote	117,292	6,712
Percentage	94.59%	5.41%
President before election
Vigdís Finnbogadóttir
Elected President
Vigdís Finnbogadóttir

Presidential elections were held in Iceland on 25 June 1988. The result was a victory for the incumbent president Vigdís Finnbogadóttir, who received 95% of the vote. The election marked the first time an incumbent president was challenged when running for re-election.

== Electoral system ==
The President of Iceland is elected in one round by first-past-the-post voting.

== Results ==
Candidate	Votes	%
Vigdís Finnbogadóttir	117,292	94.59
Sigrún Þorsteinsdóttir	6,712	5.41
Total	124,004	100.00
Valid votes	124,004	98.00
Invalid/blank votes	2,531	2.00
Total votes	126,535	100.00
Registered voters/turnout	173,829	72.79
Source: Nohlen & Stöver
