= 1956 Icelandic presidential election =

← 1952	1956	1960 →
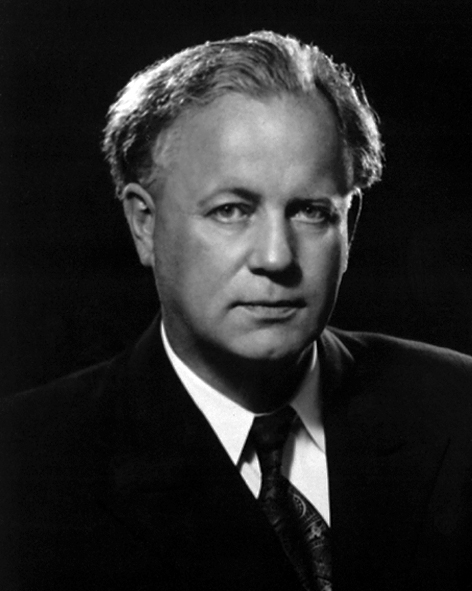
Nominee	Ásgeir Ásgeirsson
Popular vote	Unopposed
President before election
Ásgeir Ásgeirsson
Elected President
Ásgeir Ásgeirsson

Presidential elections were scheduled to be held in Iceland in 1956. However, incumbent President Ásgeir Ásgeirsson was the only candidate, and the election was uncontested.
