= 1968 Icelandic presidential election =

← 1964	30 June 1968	1972 →
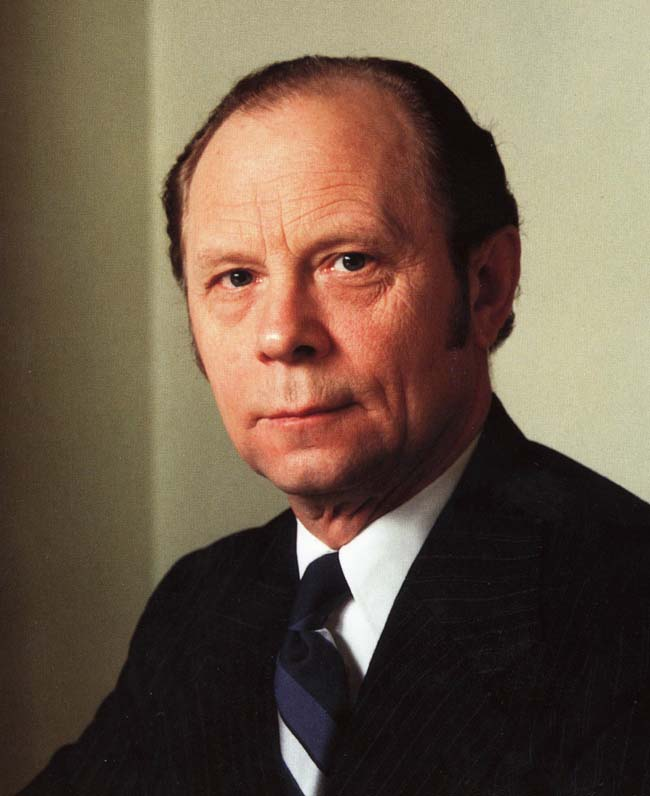

Nominee	Kristján Eldjárn	Gunnar Thoroddsen
Popular vote	67,544	35,428
Percentage	65.59%	34.41%
President before election
Ásgeir Ásgeirsson
Elected President
Kristján Eldjárn

Presidential elections were held in Iceland on 30 June 1968. The result was a victory for Kristján Eldjárn, who received 66% of the vote.

== Electoral system ==
The President of Iceland is elected in one round by first-past-the-post voting.

== Results ==
Candidate	Votes	%
Kristján Eldjárn	67,544	65.59
Gunnar Thoroddsen	35,428	34.41
Total	102,972	100.00
Valid votes	102,972	99.12
Invalid/blank votes	918	0.88
Total votes	103,890	100.00
Registered voters/turnout	112,737	92.15
Source: Nohlen & Stöver
