= 1952 Icelandic presidential election =

← 1949	29 June 1952	1956 →
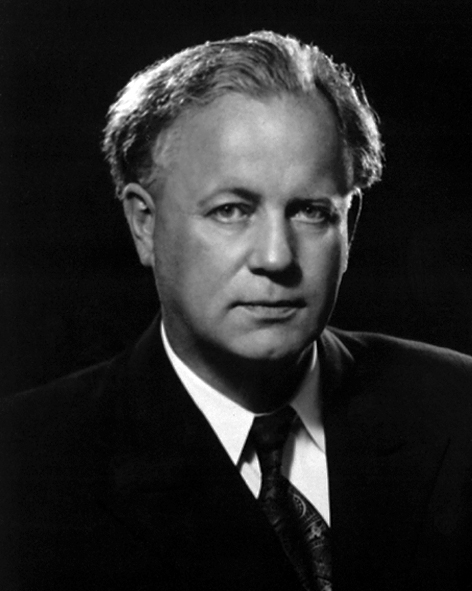

Nominee	Ásgeir Ásgeirsson	Bjarni Jónsson	Gísli Sveinsson
Popular vote	32,924	31,045	4,255
Percentage	48.26%	45.50%	6.24%
President before election
Interim triumvirate
Elected President
Ásgeir Ásgeirsson

Early presidential elections were held for the first time in Iceland on 29 June 1952. The elections were required following the death of incumbent president Sveinn Björnsson on 25 January. Between his death and the elections, the powers of the presidency were constitutionally vested jointly in Prime Minister Steingrímur Steinþórsson, Speaker of the Althing Jón Pálmason and President of the Supreme Court Jón Ásbjörnsson.

The result was a victory for Ásgeir Ásgeirsson, who received 48% of the vote. This was the first contested presidential election in the history of Iceland.

== Electoral system ==
The President of Iceland is elected in one round by plurality via first-past-the-post voting.

== Results ==
Candidate	Votes	%
Ásgeir Ásgeirsson	32,924	48.26
Bjarni Jónsson	31,045	45.50
Gísli Sveinsson	4,255	6.24
Total	68,224	100.00
Valid votes	68,224	96.84
Invalid/blank votes	2,223	3.16
Total votes	70,447	100.00
Registered voters/turnout	85,877	82.03
Source: Nohlen & Stöver
