= 1964 Icelandic presidential election =

← 1960	1964	1968 →
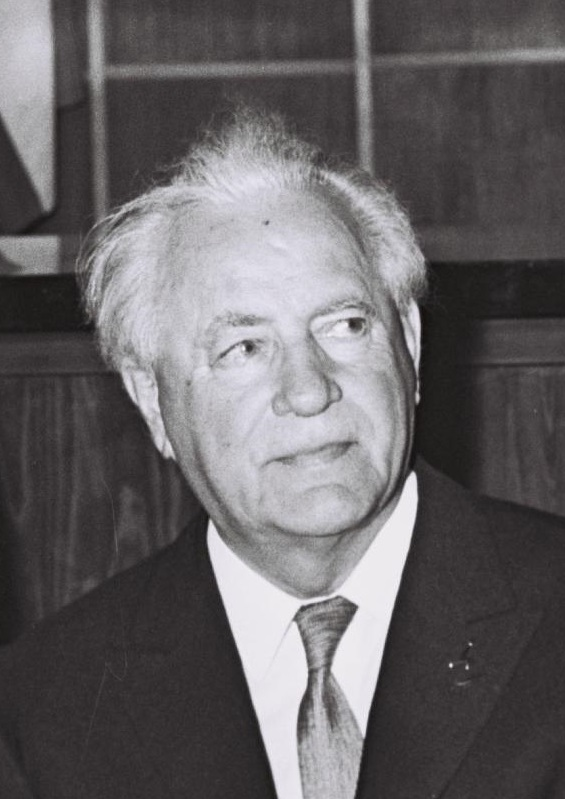
Nominee	Ásgeir Ásgeirsson
Popular vote	Unopposed
President before election
Ásgeir Ásgeirsson
Elected President
Ásgeir Ásgeirsson

Presidential elections were scheduled to be held in Iceland in 1964. However, incumbent President Ásgeir Ásgeirsson was the only candidate, and the election was uncontested.
