= 1976 Icelandic presidential election =

← 1972	1976	1980 →
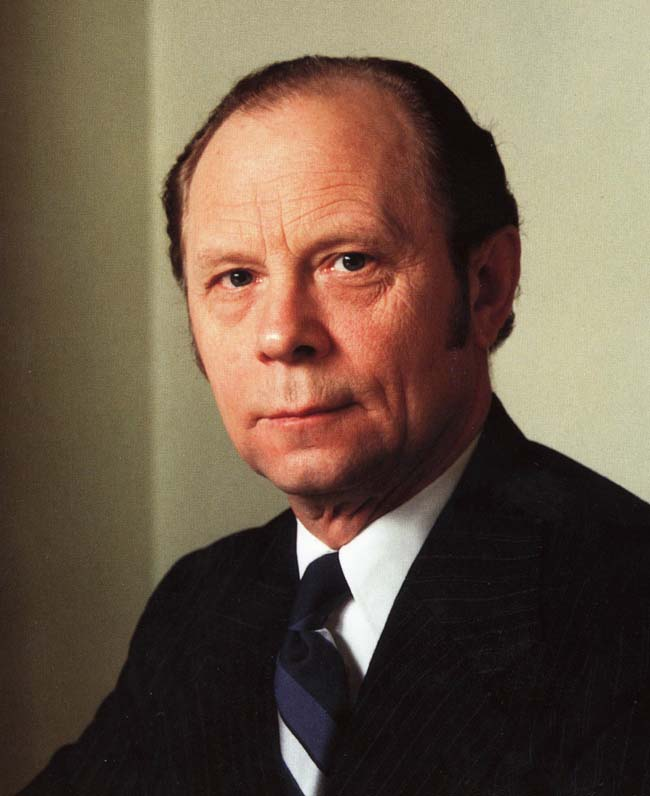
Nominee	Kristján Eldjárn
Popular vote	Unopposed
President before election
Kristján Eldjárn
Elected President
Kristján Eldjárn

Presidential elections were scheduled to be held in Iceland in 1976. However, incumbent president Kristján Eldjárn was the only candidate and the election was uncontested.
