= Impasse =

Deadlock in negotiations

A bargaining impasse (French pronunciation: [ɛ̃pas]) occurs when the two sides negotiating an agreement are unable to reach an agreement and become deadlocked. An impasse is almost invariably mutually harmful, either as a result of direct action which may be taken such as a strike in employment negotiation or sanctions/military action in international relations, or simply due to the resulting delay in negotiating a mutually beneficial agreement. The word impasse may also refer to any situation in which no progress can be made. Impasses provide opportunities for problem solving to provide an insight that leads to progress.

Impasse can provide a credible signal that a party's position is genuine and not merely an ambit claim.

Impasse may also arise if parties suffer from self-serving bias. Most disputes arise in situations where facts are able to be interpreted in multiple ways, and if parties interpret the facts to their own benefit they may be unable to accept the opposing party's claim as reasonable. They may believe the other side is either bluffing or acting unfairly and deserves to be "punished".

As bargaining impasse is mutually harmful, it may be beneficial for the parties to accept binding arbitration or mediation to settle their dispute, or the state may impose such a solution. Indeed, compulsory arbitration following impasse is a common feature of industrial relations law in the United States and elsewhere.

The word impasse is taken from the French impasse.

== See also ==
- Gridlock (politics)
- List of French expressions in English
- Mexican standoff
- Nash equilibrium
- Obstacle
- Stalemate
- Vendor lock-in
