= Vigdís Finnbogadóttir =

President of Iceland from 1980 to 1996

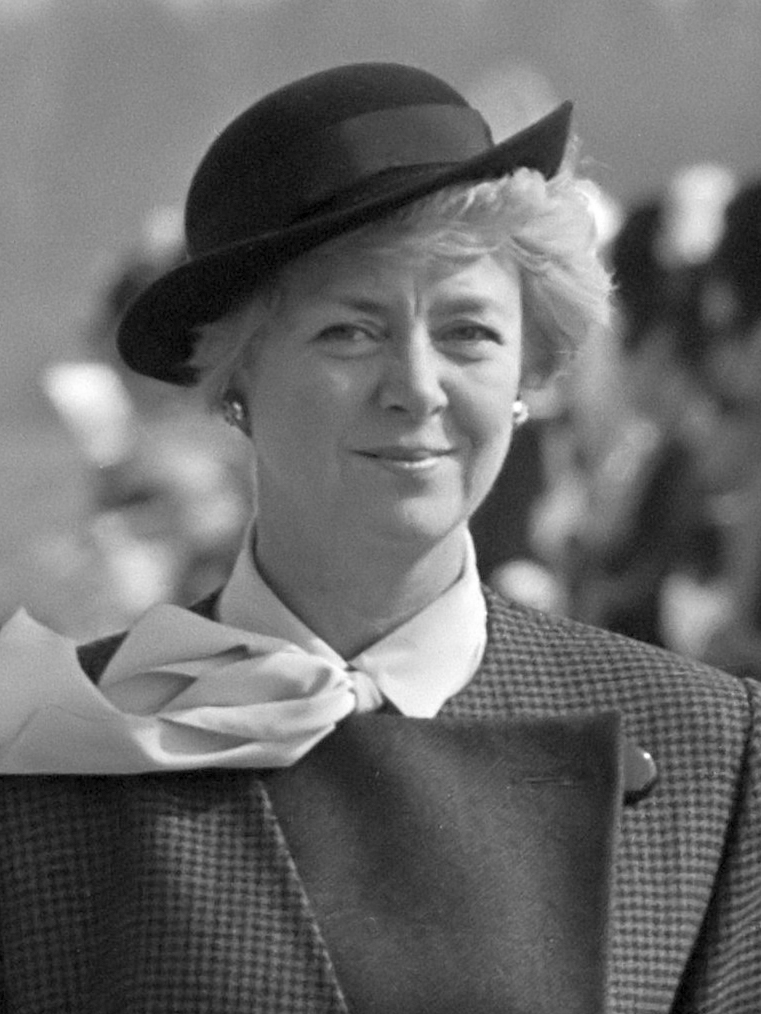
- Vigdís in 1985

4th President of Iceland
- In office 1 August 1980 – 1 August 1996
- Prime Minister: Gunnar Thoroddsen; Steingrímur Hermannsson; Þorsteinn Pálsson; Davíð Oddsson
- Preceded by: Kristján Eldjárn
- Succeeded by: Ólafur Ragnar Grímsson

Personal details
- Born: 15 April 1930 (age 96) Reykjavík, Iceland
- Spouse: Ragnar Arinbjarnar (m. 1954; div. 1961)
- Children: 1
- Education: Université Grenoble Alpes; Sorbonne University; University of Copenhagen; University of Uppsala; University of Iceland (BA)
- Profession: theatre director; teacher; politician; diplomat

Vigdís Finnbogadóttir (Icelandic: [ˈvɪɣtis ˈfɪnpɔɣaˌtouʰtɪr̥]; born 15 April 1930) is an Icelandic stateswoman and theatre director who served as the president of Iceland, from 1980 to 1996, the first woman to hold the position and the first in the world to be democratically elected president of a country. (Note: Isabel Perón was the first woman in the world who served as president (1974), but she had been elected vice president (1973) and only took office by succession, when her husband President Juan Perón died in office. Khertek Anchimaa-Toka in 1940 was the first non-royal female head of state in the modern era, but was titled Chairwoman of the Presidium. The first female head of government after an election was Sirimavo Bandaranaike, who became the prime minister of Ceylon in 1960.) Having served for 16 years, she was also the longest-serving elected female head of state in history. Vigdís is a UNESCO Goodwill Ambassador and a member of the Club of Madrid.

== Early life and career ==
Vigdís was born on 15 April 1930 in Reykjavík. Her father, Finnbogi Rútur Þorvaldsson, was a civil engineer, and her mother, Sigríður Eiríksdóttir, was a nurse who headed the national nurses' association. The following year, her younger brother Þorvaldur was born; he did not survive to adulthood, as he drowned in Hreðavatn. Vigdís enrolled at the University of Grenoble in 1949, later switching to the Sorbonne. She studied English and French literature, giving special emphasis to plays. She graduated in 1953.

Vigdís was married in 1954. The same year, she began acting, co-founding a theatre group. She also worked on the translation of several French plays. She enrolled at the University of Copenhagen in 1957, where she studied theatre history until the following year. She was divorced in 1963. Vigdís participated in the anti-military rallies that took place in the 1960s and 1970s, protesting the United States military presence in Iceland. Vigdís adopted a daughter in 1972, making her the first single woman in Iceland to adopt a child.

Vigdís taught French lessons on television for RÚV beginning in 1972, making her a well known figure throughout the nation. In the same year, she was appointed the artistic director of the Reykjavík Theatre Company. She became a member of the Advisory Committee on Cultural Affairs in the Nordic Countries in 1976, and the organisation's chair in 1978. She continued in all of these positions until she became President of Iceland in 1980. Other jobs she held early in life included her work as a French teacher at several colleges, including at the University of Iceland, and her work as a tour guide with the Icelandic Tourist Bureau in the summers. She eventually became the head of the Icelandic Tourist Bureau.

== Presidency (1980–1996) ==
Vigdís ran in the 1980 presidential election. During her campaign, her anti-military position and her opposition to a United States presence in Iceland led to allegations that she was sympathetic to communism. Vigdís ran for president to prove that women were able to lead political campaigns, and she did not expect to win. Despite this, Vigdís won the election on 29 June 1980. The vote was split among four candidates, and she prevailed with 33.6% of the vote. Vigdís was the first woman to ever be democratically elected as a head of state in any country, taking office on 1 August 1980 as the fourth president of Iceland. The number of women in the Althing increased significantly after her election.

Vigdís was re-elected without opposition in the 1984 presidential election. She oversaw the Reykjavík Summit on 11–12 October 1986 between American president Ronald Reagan and Soviet president Mikhail Gorbachev, which is credited with improving relations between the countries and bringing the Cold War closer to an end. In the 1988 presidential election, Vigdís became the first incumbent president of Iceland to face a challenger in the presidential election. The challenger fared poorly, and Vigdís won with 92.7% of the vote. She was again re-elected without opposition in 1992.

Though the Icelandic presidency is mostly ceremonial, Vigdís became an active president, using the role to represent the nation and to inform the national identity through cultural initiatives. Vigdís is an environmentalist, and used her presidency as a platform to advocate for environmental issues. She led a campaign for reforestation in Iceland, and called for the prevention of topsoil loss. Vigdís is also a pacifist, and she describes herself as a "peace person". She was also an advocate for gay rights as president.

The decision Vigdís considered "the most difficult episode" of her career took place in 1994 during the debate on joining the European Economic Area. A strong opposition existed against European integration in Iceland, but Vigdís supported the European Union and European integration, and she refused to use her presidential veto to block Iceland's association with the European Economic Area. Vigdís decided not to run for a fifth term as president, and her tenure ended in August 1996. She served for 16 years. To date, she is the longest-serving female elected head of state in recorded history.

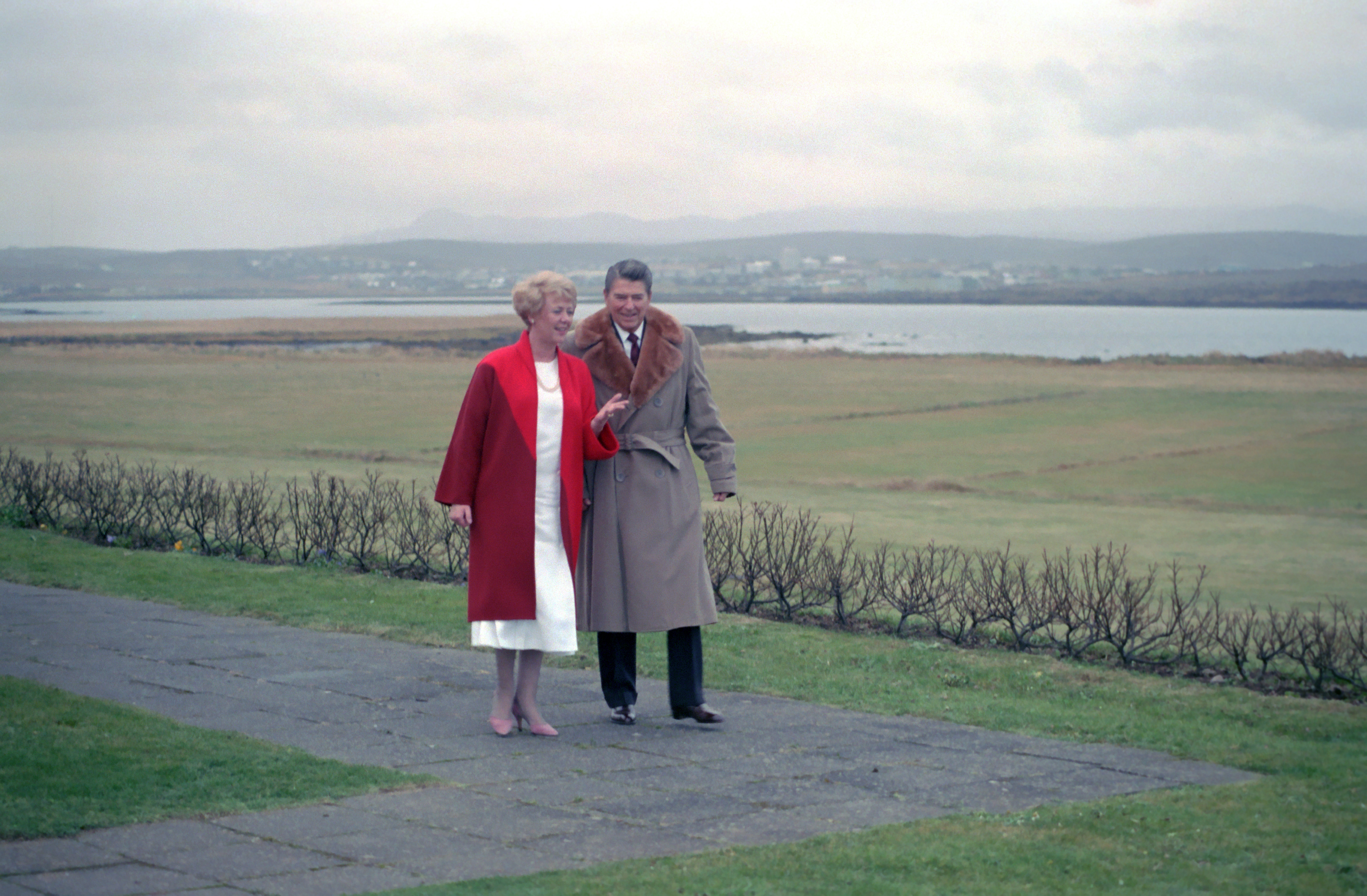
During the Reykjavík Summit, President Ronald Reagan on October 1, 1986, walks with Vigdis at Bessastaðir

== Post-presidency ==
Vigdís became the founding chair of the Council of Women World Leaders in 1996, and she was first chair of the World Commission on the Ethics in Scientific Knowledge and Technology from 1997 to 2001. Since 1998, Vigdís has served as UNESCO's Goodwill Ambassador for languages. She is also a member of the Fondation Chirac's honour committee.

Vigdís continued her peace advocacy after her tenure as president ended. In 2016, she expressed her desire for the United States and Russia to visit Iceland to resolve their differences through discussion as they did during the Reykjavík Summit. She has described the relations between the two countries as a new Cold War.

In 2025, a biopic series based on her life called "Vigdís" was released in Iceland.

Vigdís is a member of the Club of Madrid.

== Honours ==
=== National honours ===
- Iceland:
  - Grand Cross with Collar of the Order of the Falcon (1 August 1980)

=== Foreign honours ===
- Denmark:
  - Knight of the Order of the Elephant (25 February 1981)
- Sweden:
  - Knight with Collar of the Royal Order of the Seraphim (8 October 1981; collar 1987)
- United Kingdom:
  - Honorary Dame Grand Cross of the Order of Saint Michael and Saint George (18 February 1982)
  - Honorary Dame Grand Cross of the Order of the Bath (25 June 1990)
- Norway:
  - Grand Cross with Collar of the Order of St. Olav (1982)
- Finland:
  - Grand Cross with Collar of the Order of the White Rose (1982)
- Netherlands:
  - Knight Grand Cross of the Order of the Netherlands Lion (18 September 1985)
- Spain:
  - Knight Grand Cross with Collar of the Order of Charles III (11 September 1985)

=== Honorary degrees ===
- Université Bordeaux Montaigne, (former Université Bordeaux 3), France (1987)
- University of Trondheim, Norway (1993)

== See also ==
- List of the first women holders of political offices

Political offices
Preceded by Kristján Eldjárn	President of Iceland; 1980–1996	Succeeded by Ólafur Ragnar Grímsson
Diplomatic posts
New office	Chair of the Council of Women World Leaders; 1996–1999	Succeeded by Kim Campbell
