= 1980 Icelandic presidential election =

- 29 June 1980
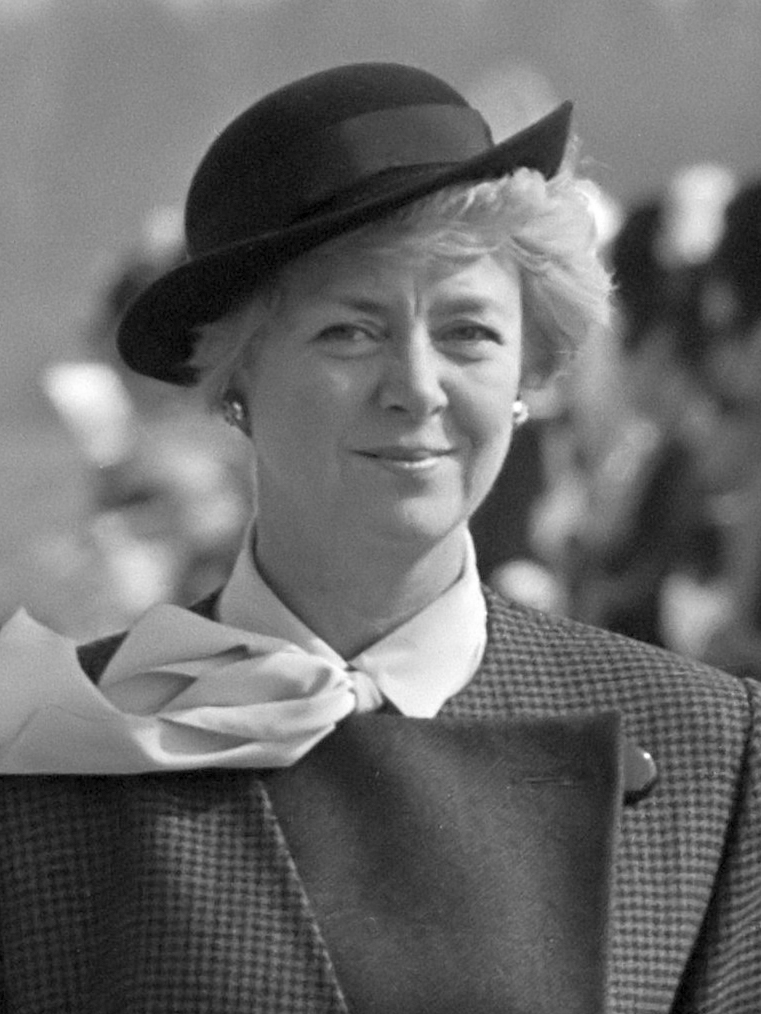
Nominee	Vigdís Finnbogadóttir	Guðlaugur Þorvaldsson
Popular vote	43,611	41,700
Percentage	33.79%	32.31%
Nominee	Albert Guðmundsson	Pétur J. Thorsteinsson
Popular vote	25,599	18,139
Percentage	19.84%	14.06%
- Results by Althing constituency
President before election
Kristján Eldjárn
Elected President
Vigdís Finnbogadóttir

Presidential elections were held in Iceland on 29 June 1980. The result was a victory for Vigdís Finnbogadóttir, who received 34% of the vote. She became the world's first democratically elected female president.

== Electoral system ==
The President of Iceland is elected in one round by first-past-the-post voting.

== Results ==
Candidate	Votes	%
Vigdís Finnbogadóttir	43,611	33.79
Guðlaugur Þorvaldsson	41,700	32.31
Albert Guðmundsson	25,599	19.84
Pétur J. Thorsteinsson	18,139	14.06
Total	129,049	100.00
Valid votes	129,049	99.58
Invalid/blank votes	546	0.42
Total votes	129,595	100.00
Registered voters/turnout	143,196	90.50
Source: Nohlen & Stöver
