= Kingdom of Iceland =

Period of Icelandic statehood from 1918 to 1944

Kingdom of Iceland Konungsríkið Ísland (Icelandic) Kongeriget Island (Danish)
- 1918–1944
- Flag Coat of arms
- Anthem: "Ó Guð vors lands" ("O, God of Our Land")
- The Kingdom of Iceland in 1933
- Status: Associated state of Denmark (1918–1940); Personal union with Denmark (1918–1940) and Regency (1940–1944)
- Capital: Reykjavík
- Common languages: Icelandic, Danish
- Religion: Church of Iceland (state religion)
- Government: Parliamentary constitutional monarchy
- King
  - 1918–1944: Kristján X
- Regent
  - 1941–1944: Sveinn Björnsson
- Prime Minister
  - 1918–1920 (first): Jón Magnússon
  - 1942–1944 (last): Björn Þórðarson
- Legislature: Althing
- Historical era: Interwar period / World War II
  - Act of Union: 1 December 1918
  - Surrender of Denmark to Nazi Germany: 9 April 1940
  - Operation Fork: 10 May 1940
  - National referendum: 20 May 1944
  - Republic proclaimed: 17 June 1944

Population
  - 1944: 125,967
- Currency: Króna
Preceded by	Succeeded by
Danish Iceland	Iceland

Monarchy of Iceland
- Royal Coat of arms

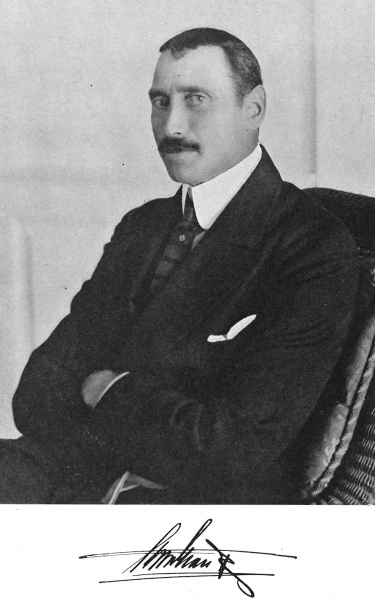
- Kristján X

Details
- Style: His Majesty
- First monarch: Kristján X (Only one to rule)
- Formed: 1 December 1918
- Abolished: 17 June 1944
- Residence: Christiansborg Palace
- Appointer: Hereditary

The Kingdom of Iceland (Icelandic: Konungsríkið Ísland; Danish: Kongeriget Island) was an associated state of Denmark (prior to its invasion by Nazi Germany) and kingdom under a personal union that was established by the Act of Union signed on 1 December 1918. It lasted until 17 June 1944 when a national referendum established the republic of Iceland in its place. The Parliament of Iceland asked that Denmark represent Iceland internationally, and day-to-day matters were delegated to a Danish plenipotentiary for Icelandic affairs based in Reykjavík, and – after the German invasion of Denmark in 1940 – a regent was appointed.

== History ==
=== Origins of Danish rule ===
Because of the Kalmar Union, Iceland had been under the control of the Crown of Denmark since 1380, although formally it had been a Norwegian possession until 1814. In 1874, one thousand years after the first acknowledged settlement, Denmark granted Iceland home rule. The constitution, written the same year, was revised in 1903 and the extent of Iceland's home rule increased in 1904.

=== Establishment of the kingdom ===
On 1 December 1918, the Act of Union, an agreement with Denmark, recognized Iceland as a fully sovereign state, an independent country in personal union with Denmark through a common monarch. The Kingdom of Iceland established its own flag and coat of arms and asked that Denmark represent its foreign affairs and defence interests on its behalf. Iceland opened its first embassy in 1920. The Act would be reviewed in 1940 and could be revoked three years later if agreement to continue it could not be reached.

=== World War II, British occupation and the establishment of the republic ===
During the first year of World War II, Iceland strictly enforced a position of neutrality and took action against both British and German forces that violated it. The German invasion of Denmark on 9 April 1940 and subsequent occupation severed communications between Iceland and Denmark. As a result, on 10 April, the Althing passed two resolutions investing the Icelandic cabinet with the power of head of state and declaring that the Kingdom of Iceland would accept full responsibility for both foreign policy and coastal surveillance. On 10 May 1940, Operation Fork was launched by the United Kingdom when military forces sailed into Reykjavík Harbour and began an invasion of Iceland. The Government of Iceland issued a protest against what it called a "flagrant violation" of Icelandic neutrality. On the day of the invasion, Prime Minister Hermann Jónasson read a radio announcement instructing Icelanders to treat the British troops as guests. On 15 May 1941, the Althing adopted a law creating the position of regent for Sveinn Björnsson in order to represent the monarchy.

At its peak, Britain had approximately 25,000 troops stationed in Iceland, all but eliminating unemployment in Reykjavík and other strategically important places. In July 1941, the Althingi adopted the American–Icelandic defence agreement, passing responsibility for Iceland's defence to the United States.

Following a constitutional referendum in May 1944, Iceland formally became a republic on 17 June 1944. King Christian X sent a message of congratulations to the Icelandic people.

== Titles of the Crown ==
- By the Grace of God, King of Iceland, Denmark, the Wends and the Goths, Duke of Schleswig, Holstein, Stormarn, Dithmarschen, Lauenburg and Oldenburg.

== Flags ==
Flag of Iceland (1915–1944)

State Flag of Iceland (1915–1944)

Royal Standard (1921–1944)

Standard of the Regent (1941–1944)

== See also ==
- Constitution of Denmark
- Danish Realm
- Faroese independence
- Greenlandic independence
- Icelandic independence movement
- Jørgen Jørgensen, a.k.a. the "Dog-Days King", self-styled ruler of Iceland for a brief period in 1809
- Lists of heads of state of Iceland
- Nobility in Iceland

== Bibliography ==
- "Iceland, Home Rule and Sovereignty (1904–44)" at Encyclopædia Britannica. Retrieved on 17 March 2014.
