= Sveinn Björnsson =

Regent/President of Iceland from 1941 to 1952

His Excellency Sveinn Björnsson
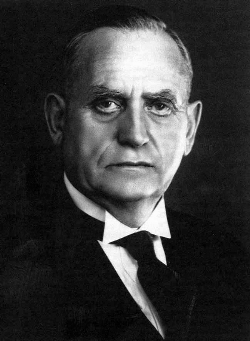
- Sveinn Björnsson

1st President of Iceland
- In office 17 June 1944 – 25 January 1952
- Prime Minister: Björn Þórðarson; Ólafur Thors; Stefán Jóhann Stefánsson; Steingrímur Steinþórsson
- Preceded by: Office established
- Succeeded by: Ásgeir Ásgeirsson

Regent of Iceland
- In office 15 May 1941 – 17 June 1944
- Monarch: Christian X
- Preceded by: Office created
- Succeeded by: Office abolished (Himself as President of Iceland)

Personal details
- Born: 27 February 1881; Copenhagen, Denmark
- Died: 25 January 1952 (aged 70); Reykjavík, Iceland
- Other political affiliations: Independence Party (1912–1915); Home Rule Party (affiliated non-member, 1918–1920)
- Spouse: Georgia Björnsson
- Children: 6, including his eldest son Björn Sveinsson Björnsson
- Education: University of Copenhagen
- Profession: Lawyer

Sveinn Björnsson (Icelandic: [ˈsveitn̥ ˈpjœsːɔn]; 27 February 1881 – 25 January 1952) was the first president of Iceland, serving from 1944 until his death in 1952.

== Background, education and legal career ==
Sveinn was born in Copenhagen, Denmark, as the son of Björn Jónsson (editor and later minister) and Elísabet Sveinsdóttir. Sveinn graduated from the Latin School in Reykjavík in 1900 and obtained a law degree from the University of Copenhagen 1907. He was licensed to practice before the "upper courts" in 1907 and before the Superior Court in 1920, and served as public prosecutor in Reykjavík 1907–1920 and 1924–1926. From 29 September 1919 to 31 December the same year, he served as prosecutor at the National Upper Court.

He was a freemason, and one of the founders of Edda Freemasonic Lodge in Reykjavík. He served as Grandmaster of the Icelandic Order of Freemasons.

== Political and diplomatic career ==
Sveinn was a member of the Reykjavík City Council 1912–1920 and its chairman 1918–1920. He was elected to the Althing for Reykjavík 1914–15 and 1919–20. After Iceland's independence from Denmark in 1918 he acted as minister to Denmark during 1920–1924 and 1926–1940.

== Regent ==
Standard as Regent of Iceland

Although Iceland had become a sovereign state in 1918, its foreign affairs had been conducted by Denmark until the beginning of the Second World War. The German occupation of Denmark in April 1940, however, resulted the Icelandic king, Christian X, who resided in Denmark, being unable to perform his constitutional functions for Iceland and Sveinn was elected Regent of Iceland three times between 1941 and 1943, assuming all the prerogatives in Icelandic affairs held by the King. In July 1941, United States troops occupied Iceland on the invitation of Sveinn's government and remained, in reduced numbers, after the war; their continued presence provoked the main controversy of the nation's postwar foreign policy.

== Presidency ==
Sveinn was elected president by the Althing on the inauguration of the republic of Iceland in 1944. His first term was only one year, since the people of Iceland were to elect their president directly for the first time in 1945. Shortly after the creation of the republic, Sveinn called on Icelandic embassies to send him all books on diplomatic protocol that they could find, so that he could follow the right customs as head of state. Foreign diplomats often remarked on how strict Sveinn was in following diplomatic protocol in his interactions with them, perhaps too strict.

Sveinn was re-elected as president in 1945 and 1949 without opposition. He set new precedent and went outside of the formal powers given to the president after the 1949 parliamentary elections when he said that he would form a government if the parties could not agree on forming in four months' time. He claimed to have these powers according to the constitution, but historian (and later president) Guðni Th. Jóhannesson rejected that these powers are set in the constitution.

Sveinn had poor relations with the Danish King, Christian X, after Iceland became a republic. The King maintained that the Icelanders had given him false assurances in 1940 that the relationship between Iceland and Denmark would return to normal after the Nazi occupation had ended; something that Sveinn denied. For this reason, Sveinn did not go on an official visit to Denmark following the creation of the republic. Christian X died in 1947. But, due to poor health, Sveinn was unable to visit Denmark during the final years of his presidency.

The nation formally became a member of NATO on 30 March 1949, amid domestic controversy and riots. On 5 May 1951, a defence agreement was signed with the United States. American troops returned to Iceland as the Iceland Defence Force, and remained throughout the Cold War. The US withdrew the last of its forces on 30 September 2006. Sveinn died in Reykjavík in January 1952, more than one year before his third term of office was due to expire; he had been in poor health since 1949. As of 2024, he remains the only president of Iceland to have died in office.

== Business activities ==
Sveinn was one of the founders of Eimskipafélag Íslands, the main shipping company in Iceland, in 1914 and its chairman 1914–1920 and 1924–1926. He was the founder of the insurance company Brunabótafélag Íslands (Icelandic Fire Insurance Company) and its director from its foundation in 1916 until 1920. He was also one of the founders of the insurance company Sjóvátryggingafélag Íslands (Icelandic Maritime Insurance Company) in 1918 and its chairman in 1918–1920 and 1924–1926. Sveinn was one of the founders of the Icelandic Red Cross on 10 December 1924 and its first chairman, serving until 1926.

== Family ==
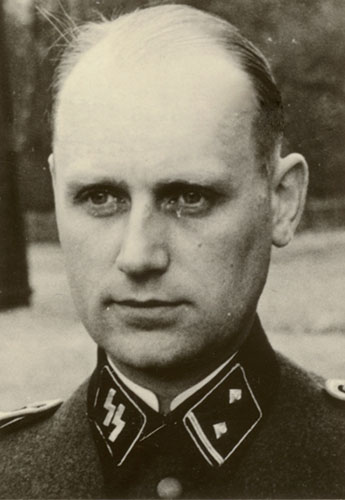
Björn Sveinsson Björnsson, Sveinn's eldest son, survived the war and died in 1998.

On 2 September 1908 he married Georgia Björnsson, born Hansen (born 18 January 1884, died 18 September 1957). They had six children: Björn (1909), Anna Catherine Aagot (1911), Henrik (1914), Sveinn Christen (1916), Ólafur (1919), Elísabet (1922). His eldest son Björn Sveinsson Björnsson served in the Nazi German military as a part of the Waffen-SS in World War II.

His granddaughter, Brynhildur Georgía Björnsson, is the subject of the historical novel Konan við 1000° (The Woman at 1000°), written by Hallgrímur Helgason and published in 2011. The novel makes extensive reference to Sveinn and other members of the family. His great-grandson is Henrik Björnsson, singer and lead guitarist in the shoegaze rock band Singapore Sling. His great-granddaughter is Georgía Olga Kristiansen, the first female referee to officiate in the highest competitive tier men's basketball league in Iceland.

== Notes ==
Political offices
Preceded by Kristján X as King of Iceland	President of Iceland; 1944–1952	Succeeded by Ásgeir Ásgeirsson
