= 1940 in Nordic music =

The following is a list of notable events and compositions of the year 1940 in Nordic music.

== Events ==
- 25 October – Lars-Erik Larsson's Intima miniatyrer för stråkkvartett, written in 1938, is premièred in Stockholm

== New works ==
- John Fernström – Cello Concerto
- Lars-Erik Larsson – God in Disguise (cantata)
- Gösta Nystroem – Viola Concerto, "Hommage à la France"
- Geirr Tveitt – Dragaredokko (opera)
- Dag Wirén – Sonatina for violin and piano

== Popular music ==
- Thore Ehrling, Eskil Eckert-Lundin, Hasse Ekman – "Regntunga skyar"
- Leo Mathisen – "Take it Easy"
- Nils Perne (Jokern) – "Min soldat"
- Jean Sibelius – "Finlandia hymn" (new version with words by Veikko Antero Koskenniemi

== Film music ==
- Victor Cornelius – Familien Olsen
- Jolly Kramer-Johansen – Vildmarkens sång

== Musical films ==
- SF-paraati, with music by Georg Malmstén
- Swing it, magistern!, with music by Sten Axelsson, Alice Tegnér, Thore Ehrling & Kai Gullmar and others

== Births ==
- 20 March – Frode Thingnæs, Norwegian jazz trombonist, composer, music arranger, and conductor (died 2012)
- 29 March – Allan Botschinsky, Danish jazz trumpeter (died 2020)
- 3 May – Leif Rygg, Norwegian Hardanger fiddle player (died 2018)
- 12 May – Lill Lindfors, Finnish-Swedish singer
- 22 December – Boris Lindqvist, Swedish jazz and rock musician and schlager singer (died 2017)

== Deaths ==
- 7 January – Carl Boberg, Swedish hymn-writer (born 1859)
- 29 May – Mathilda Grabow, Swedish operatic soprano (born 1852)
- 6 November – Ivar F. Andresen, Norwegian operatic bass (born 1896)
- 3 December – Walborg Lagerwall, Swedish cellist (born 1851)
- unknown date – Petur Alberg, Faroese violinist and composer (born 1885)

== See also ==
- 1940 in Denmark
- 1940 in Iceland
- 1940 in Norwegian music
- 1940 in Sweden
