= 1948 in Iceland =

- Decades: 1920s; 1930s; 1940s; 1950s; 1960s
- See also: Other events of 1948; Timeline of Icelandic history

This list includes events that happened in 1948 in Iceland.

== Incumbents ==
- President – Sveinn Björnsson
- Prime Minister – Stefán Jóhann Stefánsson

== Events ==
- KR won the 1948 Úrvalsdeild, the top-flight of Icelandic football.
- The Foreign Minister, Bjarni Benediktsson with new Minister Richard P. Butrick signed an agreement that would make Iceland a recipient of the Marshall Plan assistance.
- Iceland's athletes competed at the 1948 Winter Olympics in St. Moritz for the first time and participated in every one since then.

== Births ==
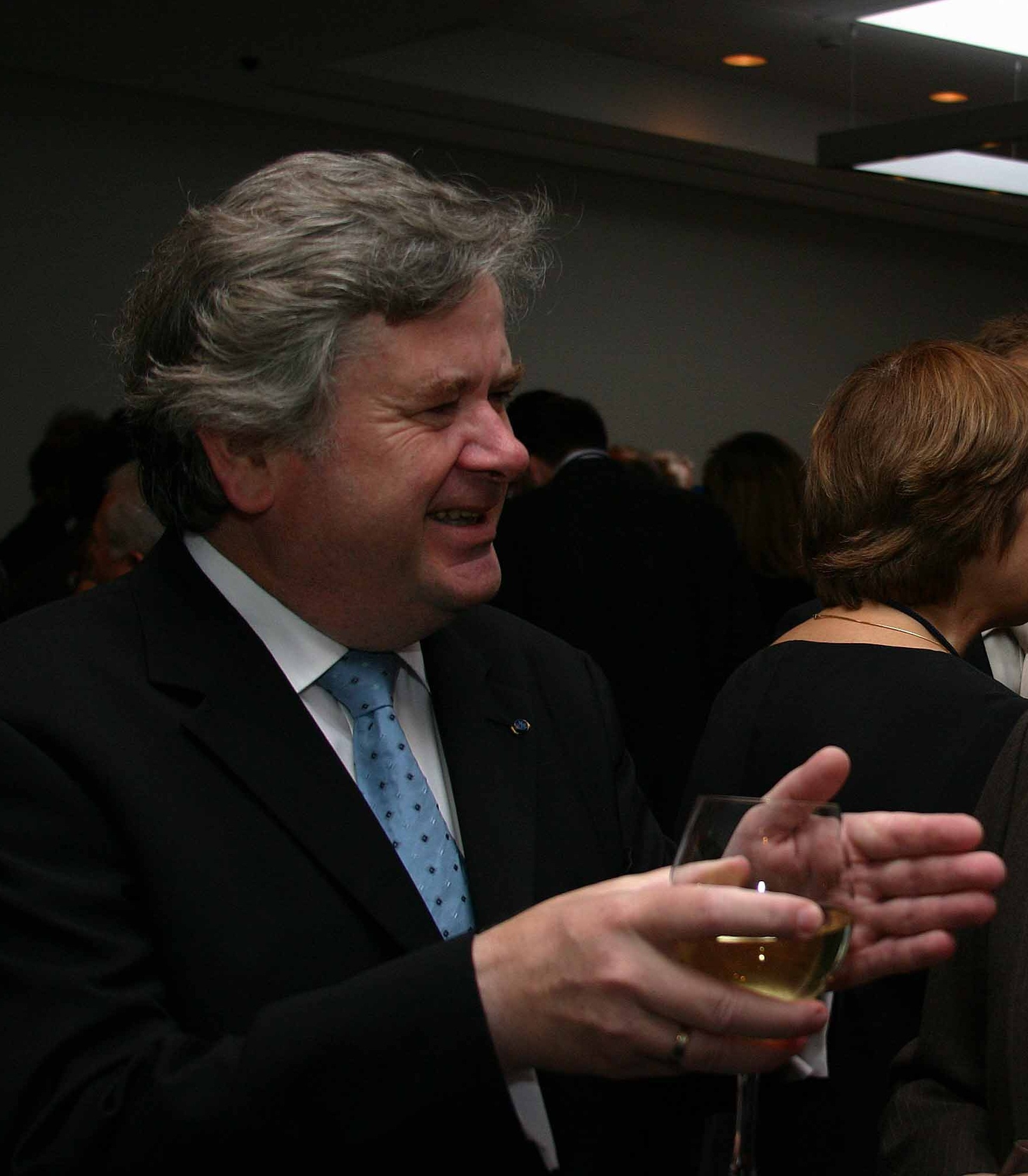
Davíð Oddsson, Prime Minister 1991–2004

- 8 January – Þuríður Backman, politician
- 14 January – Davíð Oddsson, politician
- 10 February – Sigurbergur Sigsteinsson, handball player
- 17 June – Hrafn Gunnlaugsson, film director
- 17 July – Ögmundur Jónasson, politician.
- 18 July – Ólafur Gunnarsson, writer
- 25 July – Elmar Geirsson, footballer
- 30 July – Sigurður Pálsson, writer (d. 2017)
- 7 August – Vilmundur Gylfason, politician, historian and poet (d. 1983)
- 19 November – Hanna María Karlsdóttir, actress
