= 1953 in Iceland =

- Decades: 1930s; 1940s; 1950s; 1960s; 1970s
- See also: Other events of 1953; Timeline of Icelandic history

The following events happened in Iceland in 1953.

== Incumbents ==
- President – Ásgeir Ásgeirsson
- Prime Minister – Steingrímur Steinþórsson, Ólafur Thors

== Events ==
The year 1953 in Iceland was mostly remembered due to the Cambridge Langjökull Expedition which involved exploring the "Ok" volcano known for erupting in the Pleistocene era.

== Births ==
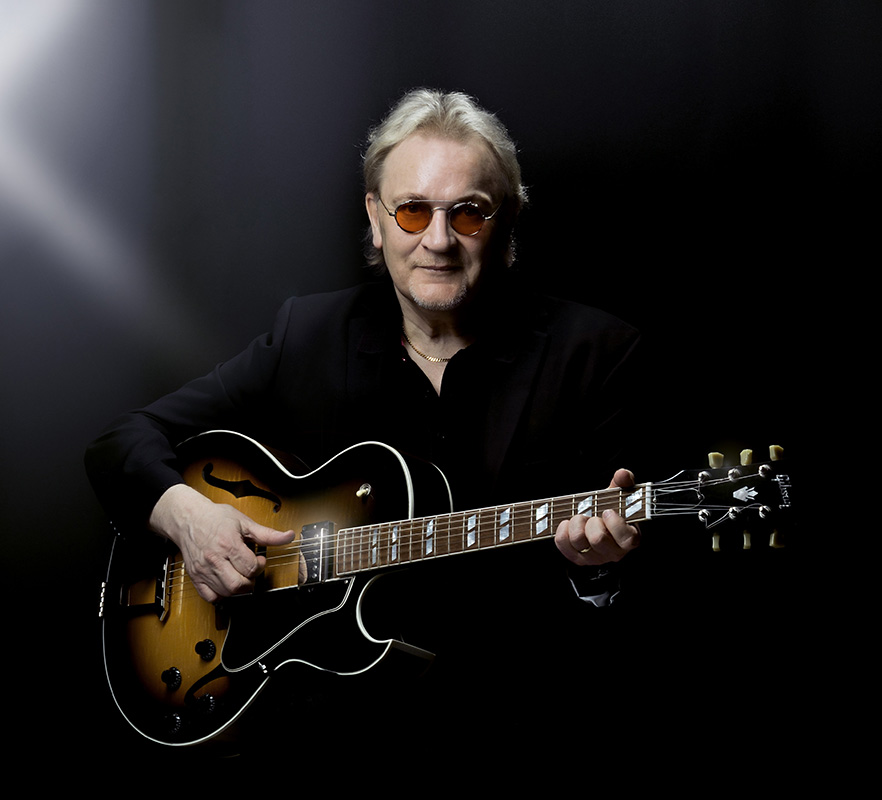
Herbert Guðmundsson

- 9 February – Egill Ólafsson, singer, songwriter and actor
- 19 February – Hannes Hólmsteinn Gissurarson, political scientist
- 1 May – Ragnheiður Gestsdóttir, children's writer
- 12 June – Árni Steinar Jóhannsson, politician
- 19 June – Össur Skarphéðinsson, politician
- 26 June – Kristján L. Möller, politician
- 15 December – Herbert Guðmundsson, singer-songwriter

== Deaths ==
- 13 October – Sigurgeir Sigurðsson, the eighth Bishop of Iceland, served in office since 1939 (b. 1890)
