= 1952 in Iceland =

- Decades: 1930s; 1940s; 1950s; 1960s; 1970s
- See also: Other events of 1952; Timeline of Icelandic history

The following lists events that happened in 1952 in Iceland.

== Incumbents ==
- President – Sveinn Björnsson, Ásgeir Ásgeirsson
- Prime Minister – Steingrímur Steinþórsson

== Births ==
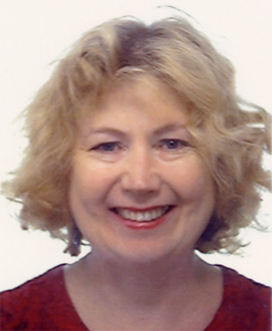
Hallgerður Gísladóttir

- 14 January – Teitur Thordarson, footballer
- 11 March – Sólveig Pétursdóttir, politician.
- 8 April – Bogi Ágústsson, news reporter
- 15 June – Sigurjón Sighvatsson, film producer.
- 23 September – Hjálmar H. Ragnarsson, composer (d. 2026)
- 28 September – Hallgerður Gísladóttir, ethnologist and poet (d. 2007)
- 3 November – Ingi Björn Albertsson, footballer
- 11 November - Jóhanna Einarsdóttir, educator
- 28 December - Edda Andrésdóttir, journalist and writer

== Deaths ==
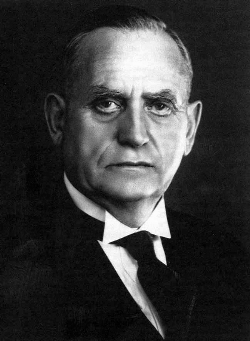
Sveinn Björnsson

- 25 January – Sveinn Björnsson, first President of the Republic of Iceland (1944–1952) (b. 1881)
