= 1946 in Iceland =

- Decades: 1920s; 1930s; 1940s; 1950s; 1960s
- See also: Other events of 1946; Timeline of Icelandic history

The following lists events that happened in 1946 in Iceland.

== Incumbents ==
- President – Sveinn Björnsson
- Prime Minister – Ólafur Thors

== Events ==
- 7 October – Keflavik Agreement is signed between the United States and Iceland.
- 19 November – Iceland joins the United Nations.
- Icelandic parliamentary elections.
- Withdrawal of the United States forces from Iceland after the end of World War in 1946.

== Births ==
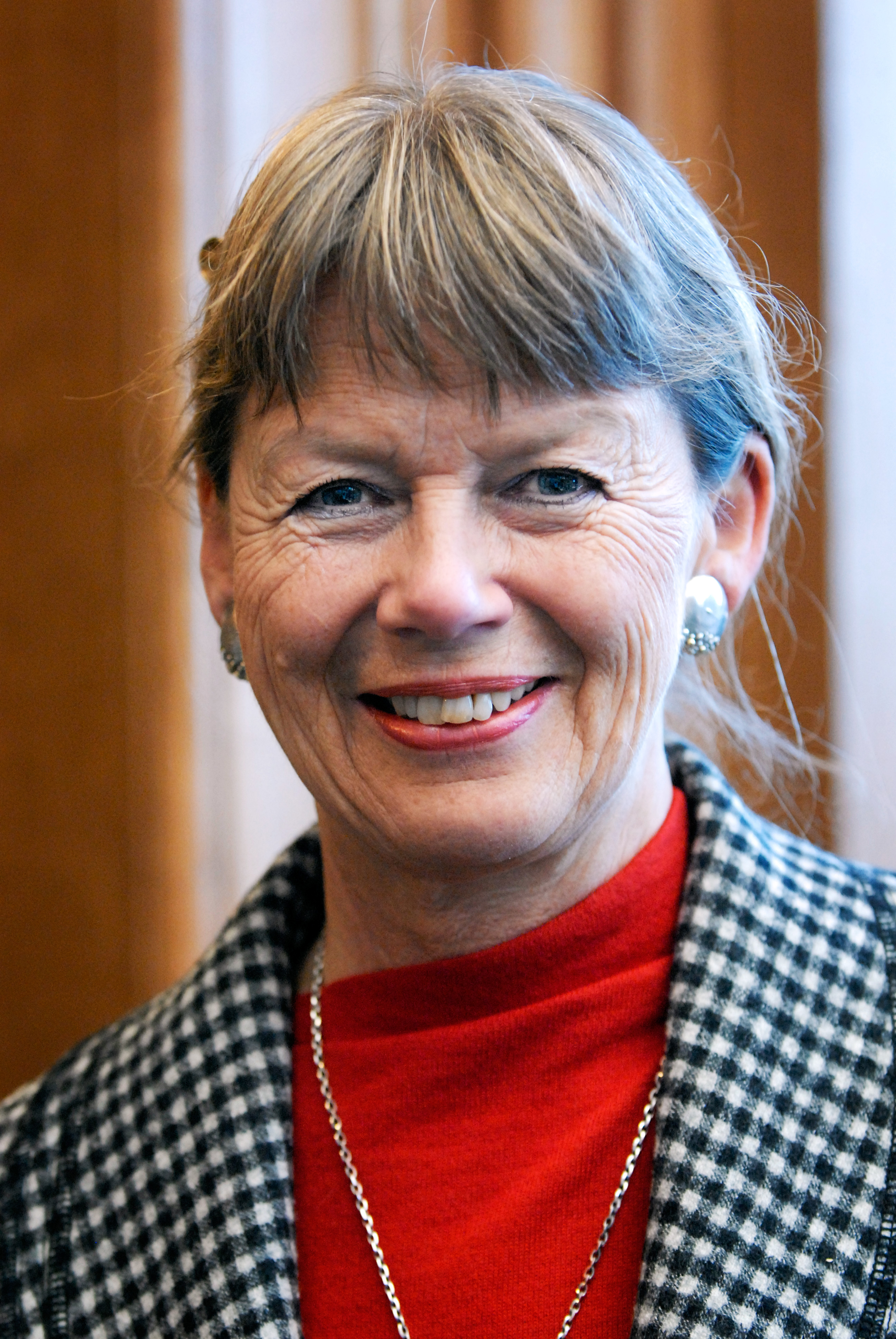
Sigríður Anna Þórðardóttir

- 26 April – Vilhjálmur Þórmundur Vilhjálmsson, lawyer and politician
- 14 May – Sigríður Anna Þórðardóttir, politician.
- 7 August – Geir Hallsteinsson, handball player
- 17 September – Helgi Númason, footballer
- 6 November – Katrín Fjeldsted, politician
- 9 December – Hermann Gunnarsson, footballer, handball player and media personality (d. 2013).
- 12 December – Matthías Hallgrímsson, footballer

== Deaths ==
- 1 December - Jónína Jónatansdóttir, politician
