= 1945 in Iceland =

- Decades: 1920s; 1930s; 1940s; 1950s; 1960s
- See also: Other events of 1945; Timeline of Icelandic history

The following lists events that happened in 1945 in Iceland.

== Incumbents ==
- President – Sveinn Björnsson
- Prime Minister – Ólafur Thors

== Events ==
- Hákon Bjarnason, director of the Icelandic Forest Service, introduces lupine from Alaska to Iceland where it becomes an invasive species.

== Births ==
- 7 April – Magnús Þór Jónsson, vocalist and songwriter
- 21 September – Bjarni Tryggvason, astronaut (d. 2022)
- 1 December – Ásta B. Þorsteinsdóttir, politician
- 12 December – Gísli S. Einarsson, politician
