= Toy (chewing gum) =

Swedish chewing gum brand

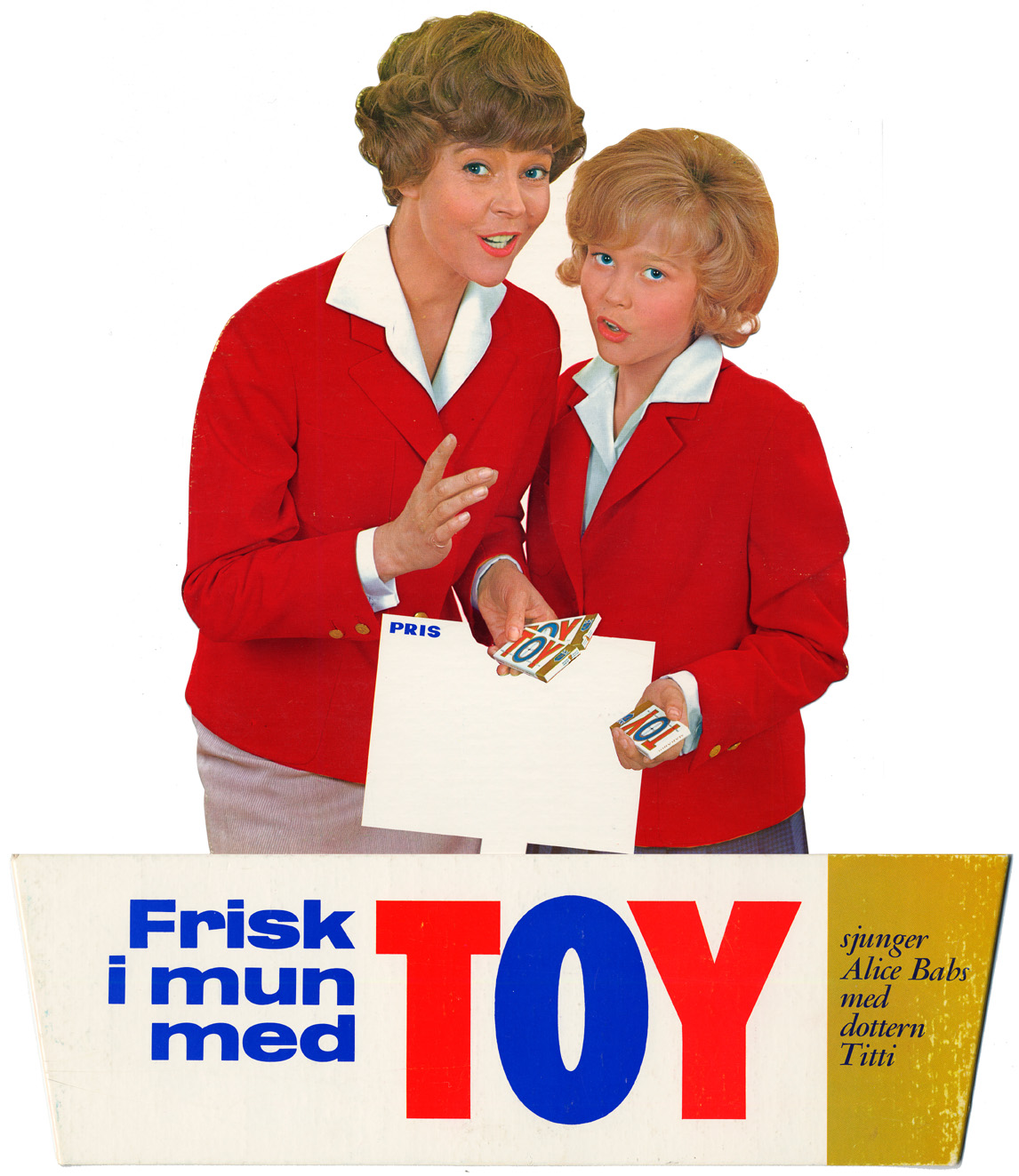
- Alice Babs and her daughter Titti (1960)
- Product type: Bubble gum
- Current owner: Marabou
- Country: Sweden
- Introduced: 1930; 96 years ago

Toy was a chewing gum sold in Sweden.

== History ==
Toy was created in 1930 by Marabou. In the 1960s and 1970s the chewing gum was an enormously popular in both Sweden and Norway and 600–700 tonnes of chewing gum were sold every year. Production was later taken over by Malaco who moved the manufacturing to Denmark. During the 1990s a few hundred tons of chewing gum per year was made, but in 1998 the production was discontinued due to increased competition, mainly from sugar free chewing gums. The launch of sugar free Toy failed. For the 70th anniversary in 2004 a special edition batch of 700,000 packs were sold for a short period of time. Years later, it became regularly available again.

Toy was sold in Sweden with the famous catchphrase Ta't lugnt, ta en Toy (=Take it easy, have a Toy). Another slogan used was Frisk i mun med Toy (=Fresh mouth with Toy).

Alice Babs starred in several advertising films with Toy singing: "Jag känns väl igen från kartongen/och kanske även på sången" (=I may be recognized from the pack / and maybe also for my singing).
