= Regntunga skyar =

Song by Alice Babs & Adolf Jahr
- Language: Swedish
- Recorded: 1940
- Songwriters: Thore Ehrling; Eskil Eckert-Lundin; Hasse Ekman

"Regntunga skyar" is a song performed by Alice Babs and Adolf Jahr in the 1940 Swedish film Swing it, magistern!

The music was composed by Thore Ehrling and Eskil Eckert-Lundin, with lyrics by Hasse Ekman.

== Covers ==
- Robyn performed the song on her 2002 album Don't Stop the Music.
