= 1947 in Iceland =

- Decades: 1920s; 1930s; 1940s; 1950s; 1960s
- See also: Other events of 1947; Timeline of Icelandic history

The following lists events that happened in 1947 in Iceland.

== Incumbents ==
- President – Sveinn Björnsson
- Prime Minister – Ólafur Thors, Stefán Jóhann Stefánsson

== Events ==
- Iceland formally takes membership alongside Afghanistan and Sweden into the United Nations, after being admitted the year prior.
- Icelandic government reserves fall below $1,000,000.
- Herring catch industry experiences growth, at the same time that transportation costs worsen inflation.

=== March ===
- 29 March - The Hekla eruption deposits tephra across South Iceland’s glaciers, influencing ablation rates and dynamics. It continues to erupt uninterrupted for 13 months.

=== May ===
- 22 May - The United Kingdom and Iceland sign an agreement for Icelandic herring oil and frozen white fish to be purchased from Iceland, to the United Kingdom.

=== June ===
- 17 June - Icelandic airline Loftleiðir commences its first international flight, from Reykjavík to Copenhagen.
- 20 June - The United Kingdom and Iceland sign an agreement to abolish visa requirements for their citizens.

=== July ===
- 24 July - The National Icelandic Association Football team lost 2-4 to the Norwegian team in an international friendly, with an attendance of 10,000 fans at Melavollur.

== Births ==
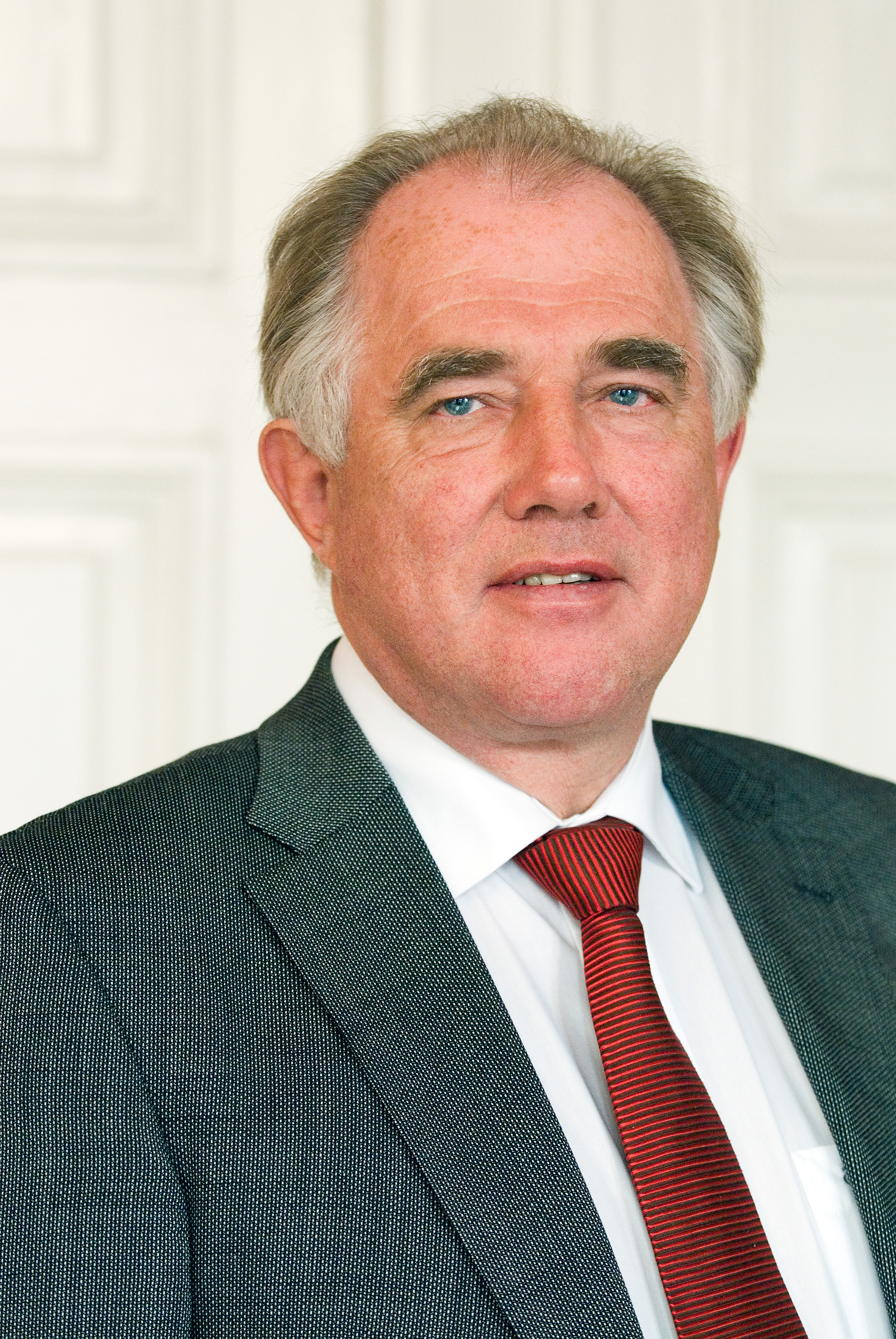
Halldór Ásgrímsson, Prime Minister 2004–2006

- 20 February – Eggert Magnússon, businessman
- 4 March – Gunnar Hansen, actor (d. 2015)
- 29 June – Ágúst Guðmundsson, film director and screenwriter
- 24 August – Ólafur Haukur Símonarson, novelist and playwright
- 8 September – Halldór Ásgrímsson, politician (d. 2015)
- 25 September – Guðmundur Sigurjónsson, chess grandmaster
- 26 October – Gísli Guðjónsson, professor of forensic psychology
- 31 October – Gunnsteinn Skúlason, handball player.

== Deaths ==
- 12 September – Thor Philip Axel Jensen, Danish entrepreneur who settled in Iceland (b. 1863)
- 2 November - Steinthór Sigurdsson, director of Iceland’s State Research Institute (b. 1904)
