= Viran Rydkvist =

Swedish actress and theatre director

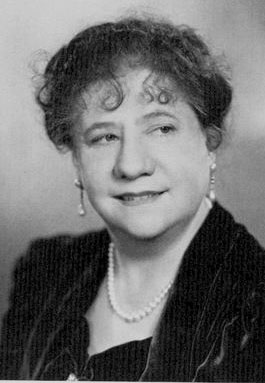
- Viran Rydqvist c. 1930
- Born: Anna Elvira Oscaria Rydkvist; 1 December 1879; Stockholm, Sweden
- Died: 10 July 1942 (aged 62); Stockholm, Sweden
- Occupations: Actor; theatre director

Anna Elvira Oscaria Rydkvist (1 December 1879 – 10 July 1942), known as Viran Rydkvist, was a Swedish actress and theatre director. Born and brought up in Stockholm, she made her acting debut in 1897 at the Arena theatre. During her career, she appeared in numerous stage performances as well as 29 film productions. In 1915, she co-founded the Slottsskogsteatern in Gothenburg. Between 1922 and 1935, she ran the Lilla teatern, becoming one of the first women to run a theatre in Sweden.

== Life ==
Viran Rydkvist was born on 1 December 1879 in Stockholm, Sweden. She was the daughter of actors Sara (née Lundgren) and Albert Rydqvist, who also owned a theatre. She first appeared in a minor role on the Swedish theatre stage in Boccaccio in 1897. The leading Swedish theatre practitioner Albert Ranft employed Rydkvist in his company, and she began to tour with his troupe.

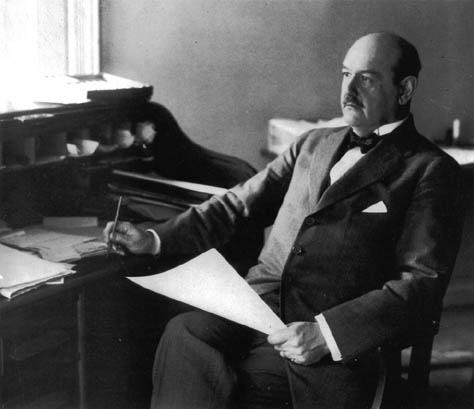
Rydkvist made her first major stage appearance with Albert Ranft's company.

Under the auspices of Ranft's company, Rydkvist was associated with the Folkan theatre from 1900 to 1903, and arrived at the theatre scene of Gothenburg where she made her first major stage appearance. Axel Engdahl engaged her to appear at the Folkteatern, and she was cast in several revue performances, farces, and comedies, until 1922. During this time, she toured with Engdahl's ensemble, and subsequently founded her own troupe. Her strong point on stage was her soprano voice, and she began to appear not only in light comic roles but also played fully developed characters. After 1922, she moved to Stockholm where she continued to perform pieces at the Vasateatern. She also appeared on the radio and in cinemas. She soon began to make a name for herself in films such as Swing it, magistern! (1940), where she played the headmistress Agda Löfbeck, and Magistrarna på sommarlov (1941), which also starred Alice Babs.

Besides her acting work, Rydkvist also became one of the first women to run a theatre in Sweden. In 1915, she co-founded the theatre Slottskogsteatern in Gothenburg. She established the Gothenburg's open-air theatre the following year, and ran it until 1923. Between 1922 and 1935, she ran the Lilla teatern in Gothenburg, one of the last outdoor theatres in Sweden. During this time, the theatre staged popular comedies, as well as dramas. Rydkvist's involvement as the manager served as a crucial milestone in the theatre's successful run, and Lilla teatern's repertoire featured productions on women's rights and conditions. She is also credited with providing career opportunities to many young Gothenburg playwrights, who were able to present their works at her theatre.

Rydkvist died in Stockholm, on 10 July 1942.

== Selected plays ==
- Vi som går köksvägen (1932)
- Kloka gubben (1936)
- Konserten (1939)
- Katten i säcken (1939)
- Den gamla visar sina medaljer (1940)
- Eldprovet (1940)
- Idag blir igår (1940)
- Nog lever farfar (1941)
- Han som kom till middag (1941)
- Lille Napoleon (1942)

== Filmography ==
Adapted from Swedish Film Database.

- Jag gifta mig – aldrig (1932)
- Pettersson & Bendel (1933)
- Shipwrecked Max (1936)
- Russian Flu (1937)
- Adolf Saves the Day (1938)
- Between Us Barons (1939)
- The Bjorck Family (1940)
- Frestelse (1940)
- Gentleman att hyra (1940)
- Hans Nåds testamente (1940)
- June Night (1940)
- Kiss Her! (1940)
- The Crazy Family (1940)
- With Open Arms (1940)
- Swing it, magistern! (1940)
- Dunungen (1941)
- Magistrarna på sommarlov (1941)
- We're All Errand Boys (1941)
- The Ghost Reporter (1941)
- Poor Ferdinand (1941)
- If I Could Marry the Minister (1941)
- En trallande jänta (1941)
- Jacobs stege (1942)
- Nothing Is Forgotten (1942)
- Rospiggar (1942)
- Sexlingar (1942)
- Tre glada tokar (1942)
- Tre skojiga skojare (1942)
