= 1943 in Iceland =

- Decades: 1920s; 1930s; 1940s; 1950s; 1960s
- See also: Other events in 1943 · Timeline of Icelandic history

The following lists the events that happened in 1943 in Iceland.

== Incumbents ==
- Monarch - Kristján X
- Prime Minister – Björn Þórðarson

== Births ==
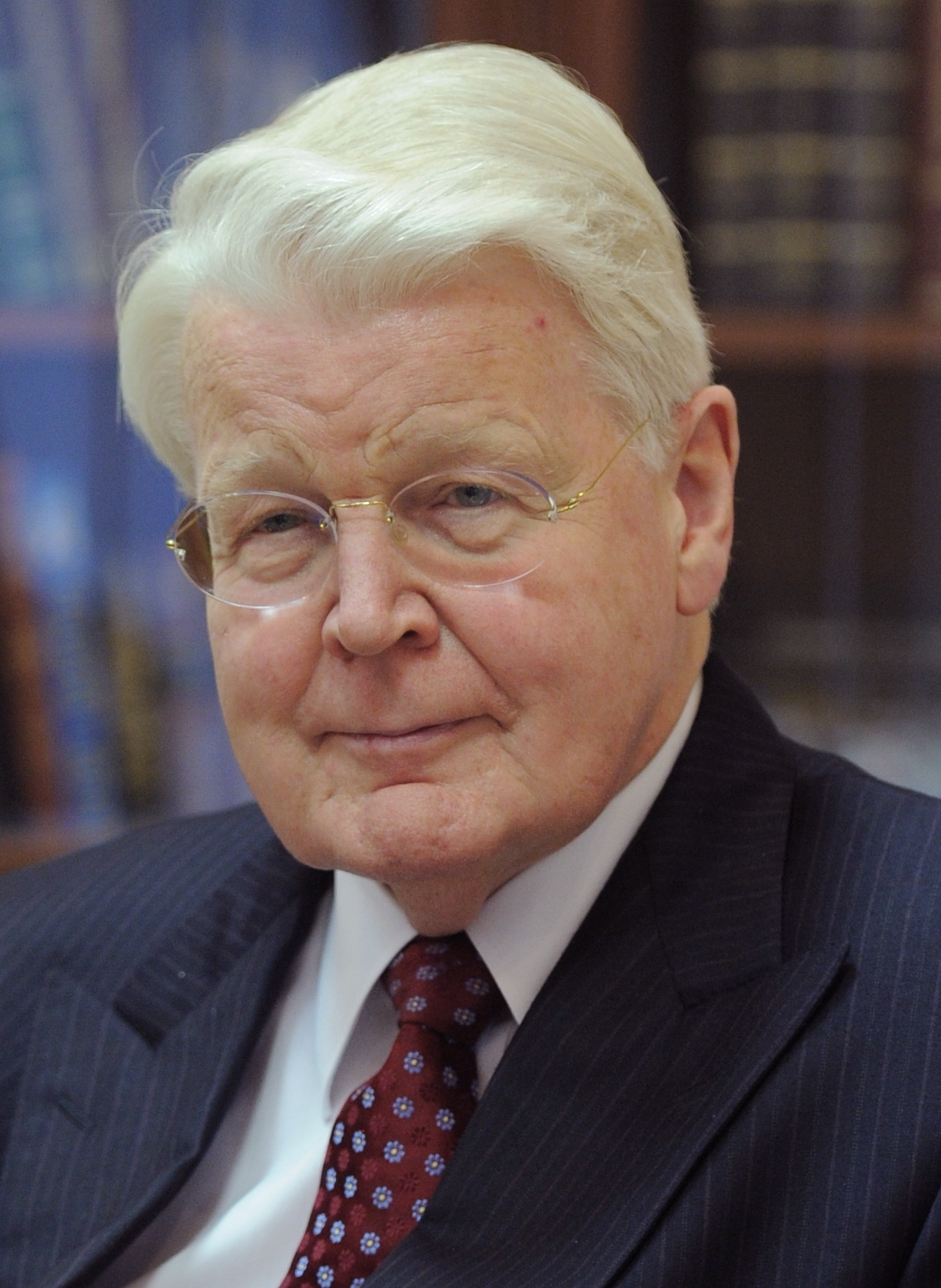
Ólafur Ragnar Grímsson, President of Iceland

- 13 February – Tómas Ingi Olrich, politician.
- 14 May – Ólafur Ragnar Grímsson, politician
- 10 June – Sigríður Jóhannesdóttir, politician
- 29 June – Baldvin Baldvinsson, footballer
- 19 August – Þór Whitehead, historian
- 18 October – Friðrik Klemenz Sophusson, politician
- 7 December – Jóhann Ársælsson, politician
- 26 December – Jón Bjarnason, politician
