= 1941 in Iceland =

- Decades: 1920s; 1930s; 1940s; 1950s; 1960s
- See also: Other events in 1941 · Timeline of Icelandic history

The following lists events that happened in 1941 in Iceland.

== Incumbents ==
- Monarch - Kristján X
- Prime Minister – Hermann Jónasson

== Events ==
7 July - the defence of Iceland was transferred to the United States from the United Kingdom following the conclusion of Operation Fork in 1940 as a means of preventing Nazi Germany from gaining access to the air and shipping routes around the country. Approximately 4,095 U.S. marines arrived in Reykjavik to replace British forces.

1 October - U.S. civilians arrived in Iceland to assist with the construction of fuel-oil facilities.

16 August - Prime Minister of the United Kingdom Winston Churchill formally visited Iceland following the Atlantic Charter.

30 October - Ingibjörg H. Bjarnason, a pioneering Icelandic politician, suffragist, schoolteacher, and gymnast, who was a pivotal advocate for women's rights and was the first woman elected into Icelandic parliament, died on 30 October 1941.

27 November - Convoy QP 3, which was part of the Arctic convoys transferring goods from the Soviet Union to the United Kingdom, made a stop in Seyðisfjörður, Iceland. Unknown - Icelandic composer Jón Leifs first premiered his Organ Concerto sometime in 1941. May 1941 - When the German battleship Bismarck sank the British vessel Hood off Iceland's Westfjords coast, gunfire could be heard approximately 200 miles away in Reykjavík. By 1941, the Althing adopted a law creating the position of regent for Sveinn Björnsson, marking a significant step toward Icelandic independence.

== Births ==
- 2 January – Björgólfur Guðmundsson, businessman.
- 6 January – Ingvar Elísson, footballer.
- 17 April – Jón Sigurðsson, politician.
- 18 September – Hafliði Hallgrímsson, composer.

== Deaths ==
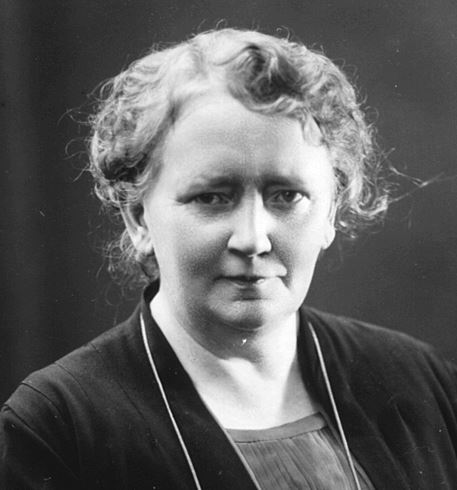
Ingibjörg H. Bjarnason

- 30 October – Ingibjörg H. Bjarnason, politician, suffragist, schoolteacher and gymnast (b. 1867).
