= 1950 in Iceland =

- Decades: 1930s; 1940s; 1950s; 1960s; 1970s
- See also: Other events of 1950; Timeline of Icelandic history

The following lists events that happened in 1950 in Iceland.

== Incumbents ==
- President – Sveinn Björnsson
- Prime Minister – Ólafur Thors, Steingrímur Steinþórsson

== Events ==
- 1950 Geysir air crash
- KR won the Úrvalsdeild.
- The Iceland Symphony Orchestra was founded.
- Heiðmörk was proclaimed a municipal conservation area of Reykjavík.
- Iceland joined the Council of Europe on March 7, 1950

== Births ==
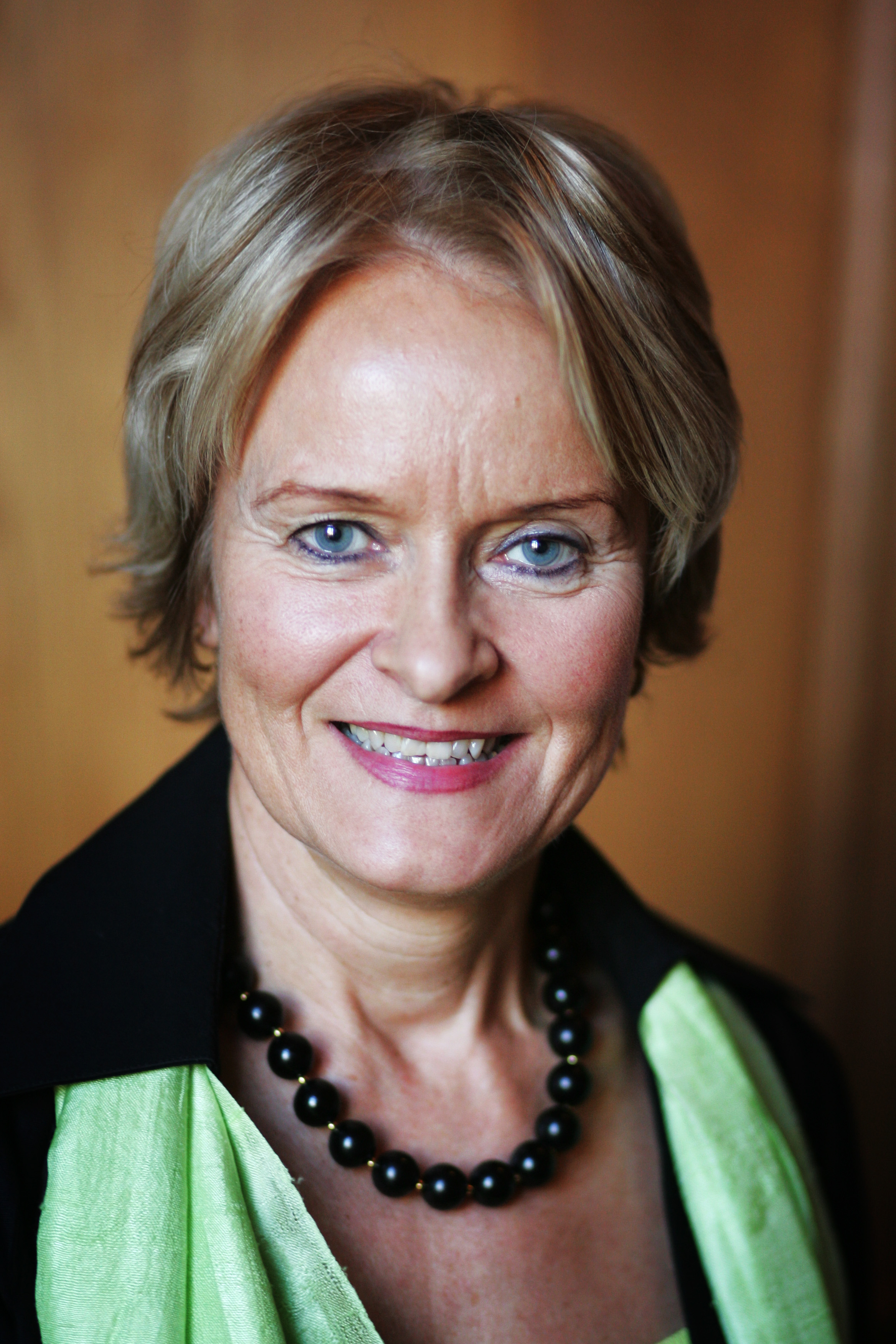
Valgerður Sverrisdóttir

- 13 January – Valgerður Bjarnadóttir, politician
- 23 March – Valgerður Sverrisdóttir, politician
- 16 June – Kristenn Einarsson, publisher
- 26 August – Steinunn Sigurðardóttir, poet and novelist
- 3 September – Jóhannes Eðvaldsson, footballer (d. 2021)
- 4 September – Tómas Pálsson, footballer
- 19 October – Guðrún Ögmundsdóttir, politician (d. 2019)
- 4 November – Jón Pétursson, footballer.

== Deaths ==
- 25 April – Guðjón Samúelsson, architect (b. 1887)
