= Adolf Saves the Day =

1938 film directed by Adolf Jahr

- Directed by: Adolf Jahr
- Written by: Gus Morris
- Starring: Adolf Jahr; Artur Cederborgh; Anna Hillberg
- Cinematography: Ernst Westerberg
- Music by: Kai Gullmar
- Production company: Ajafilm
- Distributed by: Svensk Talfilm
- Release date: 14 February 1938
- Running time: 95 minutes
- Country: Sweden
- Language: Swedish

Adolf Saves the Day (Swedish: Adolf klarar skivan) is a 1938 Swedish comedy film directed by and starring Adolf Jahr and also featuring Artur Cederborgh, Eleonor de Floer and Hilding Gavle. The film's sets were designed by the art director Bertil Duroj.

== Synopsis ==
Adolf Jansson gets a job as a servant for a wealthy family.

== Cast ==
- Adolf Jahr as Adolf Jansson
- Artur Cederborgh as August Pettersson
- Anna Hillberg as Adele Pettersson
- Eleonor de Floer as Susette Pettersson
- Hilding Gavle as Count Sixten von Jahn
- Olga Appellöf as Miss Sandin
- Eivor Engelbrektsson as Viola
- Georg Funkquist as Butler
- Gösta Gustafson as Patent Official
- Linnéa Hillberg as Gullan Hansson
- Elsa Holmquist as Karin Hansson
- Elsa Jahr as Stina
- Arne Lindblad as Berg
- Vera Lundquist as Greta
- Lotten Olsson as Mrs. Bohman
- Charley Paterson as Sirius Jansson
- Viran Rydkvist as Liskulla
- Margit Tirkkonen as Stina
- John Westin as Man in Search of Employment
- Emmy Albiin as Old Woman in Search of Employment
- Wilma Malmlöf as Old Woman in Search of Employment
- Ullastina Rettig as Young woman at Party
- Oscar Åberg as Dinner Guest

== Bibliography ==
- Larsson, Mariah; Marklund, Anders (2010). Swedish Film: An Introduction and Reader. Nordic Academic Press.
