= 1949 in Iceland =

- Decades: 1920s; 1930s; 1940s; 1950s; 1960s
- See also: Other events of 1949; Timeline of Icelandic history

The following lists events that happened in 1949 in Iceland.

== Incumbents ==
- President – Sveinn Björnsson
- Prime Minister – Stefán Jóhann Stefánsson, Ólafur Thors

== Births ==
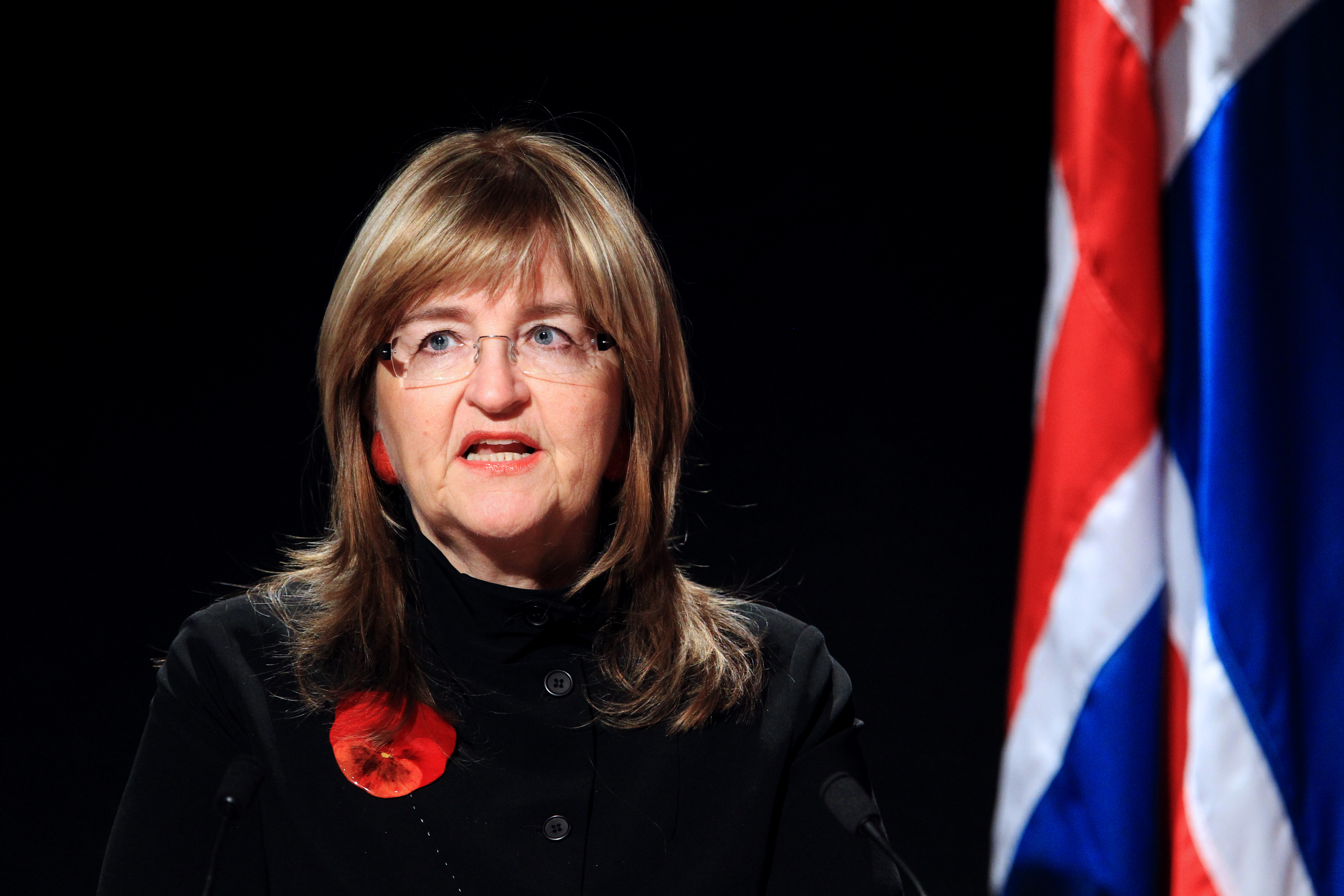
Ásta Ragnheiður Jóhannesdóttir

- 21 January – Kristín Marja Baldursdóttir, writer
- 18 February – Ingibjörg Pálmadóttir, politician.
- 3 March – Hreinn Halldórsson, track and field athlete
- 9 April – Guðni Ágústsson, politician
- 23 June – Ragnheiður Ríkharðsdóttir, politician.
- 22 August – Þórarinn Eldjárn, writer
- 16 October – Ásta Ragnheiður Jóhannesdóttir, politician
