= 1942 in Iceland =

- Decades: 1920s; 1930s; 1940s; 1950s; 1960s
- See also: Other events in 1942 · Timeline of Icelandic history

The following lists events that happened in 1942 in Iceland.

== Incumbents ==
- Monarch - Kristján X
- Prime Minister – Hermann Jónasson, Ólafur Thors, Björn Þórðarson
- Franklin D. Roosevelt (Occupied)

== Births ==
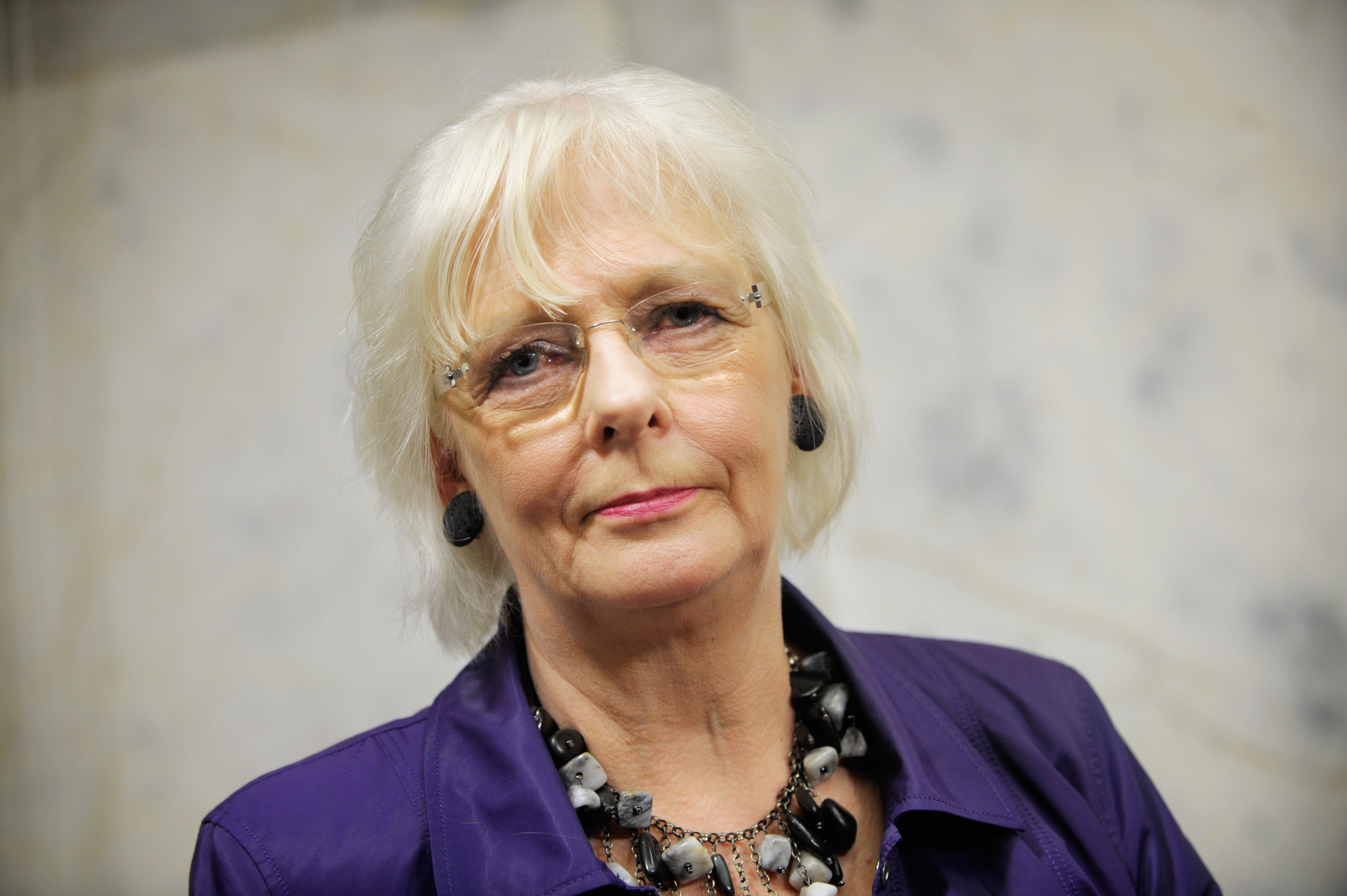
Jóhanna Sigurðardóttir

- 9 January – Eysteinn Björnsson, writer
- 23 January – Sighvatur Kristinn Björgvinsson, politician
- 11 June – Jón Halldór Kristjánsson, politician
- 12 August – Þorsteinn Gylfason, philosopher (d. 2005)
- 4 October – Jóhanna Sigurðardóttir, politician
- 21 October – Ingibjörg Haraldsdóttir, poet and translator (d. 2016)
- 2 December – Anna G. Jónasdóttir, political scientist

== Deaths ==
- 19 March – Jón Helgason, the seventh Bishop of Iceland, served in office in 1917–1939 (b. 1866)
