= List of forests in Iceland =

This is a list of forests in Iceland.

There are currently 26 forests under the management of the Icelandic Forest Service. Those forests are classified as national forests in accordance with the Forests and Forestry Act No. 33/2019. National forests may be privately owned but must be managed by the IFS or entities contracted by the IFS, such as individuals, municipalities or legal persons. Contracts between the IFS and private entities granting national forest classification must have a duration of at least 40 years.

== List ==
- Akurgerði
- Arnaldsstaðaskógur (national forest)
- Álfholtsskógur
- Ásabrekka
- Ásbyrgi (national forest)
- Brynjudalsskógur
- Bæjarstaðaskógur
- Daníelslundur
- Einkunnir
- Elliðaárdalur
- Eyjólfsstaðaskógur
- Fossá
- Furulundurinn (national forest)
- Gaddstaðaflatir
- Grundarreitur (national forest)
- Guðmundarlundur
- Gunnfríðarstaðaskógur
- Hallormsstaðaskógur (national forest)
- Hamrahlíð
- Haukadalsskógur (national forest)
- Hálsaskógur
- Hánefsstaðir
- Heiðmörk
- Hellisskógur
- Hofsstaðaskógur
- Hrútey
- Höfðaskógur
- Jafnaskarðsskógur (national forest)
- Jórvíkurskógur (national forest)
- Kirkjubæjarklaustur
- Kirkjuhvammur
- Kjarnaskógur
- Kristnesskógur (national forest)
- Laugalandsskógur
- Laugarvatnsskógur (national forest)
- Lágafell
- Leyningshólar
- Mela- og Skuggabjargaskógur (national forest)
- Mógilsá (national forest)
- Múlakot (national forest)
- Norðurtunguskógur (national forest)
- Rauðavatn
- Reykholtsskógur
- Reykjarhólsskógur (national forest)
- Selskógur (national forest)
- Sigríðarstaðaskógur (national forest)
- Skarðsdalur
- Skógarhlíð
- Skógarreitur (national forest)
- Snæfoksstaðir
- Sólbrekkuskógur
- Stálpastaðaskógur (national forest)
- Svartiskógur
- Tröð
- Tumastaðir (national forest)
- Tunguskógur
- Vaðlaskógur
- Vaglaskógur (national forest)
- Vaglir (national forest)
- Vatnshornsskógur (national forest)
- Vinaskógur
- Vífilsstaðavatn
- Völvuskógur
- Þjórsárdalur (national forest)
- Þórðarstaðaskógur (national forest)
- Þórsmörk (national forest)
- Öskjuhlíð

== See also ==
- Icelandic Forest Service
