= Icelandic Forest Service =

Government forestry service

Coordinates: 65°15′40.86″N 14°24′19.04″W

Icelandic Forest Service (Icelandic: Skógræktin)
- English logo of the Icelandic Forest Service
- Established: 2016 (Originally 1907)
- Head: Þröstur Eysteinsson, director
- Staff: c. 70
- Formerly called: Skógrækt Ríkisins
- Address: Miðvangur 2 - 4, 700 Egilsstaðir, Iceland
- Website: www.skogur.is/en

The Icelandic Forest Service (Icelandic: Skógræktin, [ˈskouː(ɣ)ˌraixtɪn]; IFS) is an agency in the Ministry for the Environment and Natural Resources of the Government of Iceland. It is responsible for research development, consultation work and the distribution of knowledge within the Icelandic forest sector, and is Iceland's representative body for international forest-related cooperation.

The IFS's two main obligations are to protect and expand the remaining native birchwoods in the country, and to execute afforestation projects for the purpose of commercial forestry.

Prior to the deforestation of Iceland in the Middle Ages, about 40% of the land was forested. In 1945, the IFS introduced the invasive Alaskan lupine to the island to reduce soil erosion, with mixed results.

Today, the country is about 2% forested, with the Icelandic Forest Service aiming to increase that share to 10% through reforestation and natural regrowth. In recent decades, state-supported afforestation on farms has become the main channel for afforestation activity in Iceland. Within the Icelandic farm afforestation grants scheme, contracts are made with landowners, afforestation plans are drawn up for each participating farm, seedling production and distribution are coordinated, education and extension services are provided and grants are distributed.

State funding of farm afforestation grants reached a maximum during 2005-2009 but was reduced after the 2008 financial collapse. Planting is on the rise again after a decade of stagnation. In recent years, with clearer signs of global warming, carbon sequestration has become one of the most important drivers of new afforestation projects in Iceland.

== See also ==
- List of forests in Iceland
- Hallormsstaðaskógur
