= Swing it, magistern! =

1940 film

- Swedish DVD-cover
- Directed by: Schamyl Bauman
- Written by: Schamyl Bauman; Hasse Ekman
- Starring: Adolf Jahr; Alice Babs
- Cinematography: Hilmer Ekdahl
- Edited by: Rolf Husberg
- Music by: Sten Axelsson; Eskil Eckert-Lundin; Thore Ehrling; Kai Gullmar
- Release date: 21 December 1940 (Sweden)
- Running time: 92 minutes
- Country: Sweden
- Language: Swedish

Swing it, magistern! is a Swedish film released to cinemas on 21 December 1940, directed by Schamyl Bauman and starring Adolf Jahr and Alice Babs.

== Synopsis ==
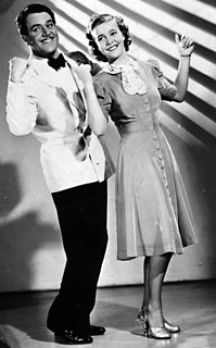
Adolf Jahr and Alice Babs.

Young student Inga Danell secretly performs at nightclubs as Linda Loy.

== Cast ==
- Adolf Jahr as "Susen" Bergman
- Alice Babs as Inga Danell / Linda Loy (credited as Alice "Babs" Nilson)
- Solveig Hedengran as Lena Larsson
- Carl Hagman as William, principal (credited as Quarl Hagman)
- Viran Rydkvist as Agda Löfbeck
- Thor Modéen as Karl-Otto Löfbeck
- John Botvid as Gustafsson
- Georg Funkquist as Furubeck
- Linnéa Hillberg as Fru Danell, Ingas mother
- Julia Cæsar as Miss Jonsson
- Åke Johansson as Axel "Acke" Danell, Ingas brother
- Nils Hallberg as Göran, student
- Ulla Hodell as Sonja Holmqvist, student
- Britt Hagman as Olga Pettersson, student
- Ragnar Planthaber as "Plantan", student
- Kaj Hjelm as "Smutte" Lindström, student
- Bert Sorbon as Ture Andersson, student

== Soundtrack ==
- "Quick-foxtrot" composed by Eskil Eckert-Lundin, Instrumental.
- "Videvisan" composed by Alice Tegnér, lyrics by Zacharias Topelius
- "Svarta Rudolf" composed by Robert Norrby, lyrics by Erik Axel Karlfeldt, performed by Bert Sorbon
- "Ich bin von Kopf bis Fuss auf Liebe angestellt" composed by Friedrich Hollaender, lyrics by Svasse Bergqvist
- "Sjungom studentens lyckliga dag" composed by Prins Gustav, lyrics by Herman Sätherberg, performed by Åke Johansson
- "Swing it, magistern!" composed by Kai Gullmar, lyrics by Hasse Ekman, performed by Alice Babs and Adolf Jahr
- "Min kärlek till dej" composed by Sten Axelson
- "Swing Ling Lej" composed by Thore Ehrling and Eskil Eckert-Lundin, lyrics by Hasse Ekman, performed by Alice Babs
- "Gymnastikrepetition" composed by Eskil Eckert-Lundin, Instrumental.
- "Regntunga skyar" composed by Thore Ehrling and Eskil Eckert-Lundin, lyrics by Hasse Ekman, performed by Alice Babs and Adolf Jahr
- "Fria preludier" composed by Adolf Jahr, instrumentalist Adolf Jahr (the piano)
- "Paris" composed by Ingrid Muschkin
- "Swing" composed by Thore Ehrling
- "Oh Boy, Oh Boy" composed by Sten Axelson, lyrics by Hasse Ekman, performed by Alice Babs
- " Engelbrektsmarschen", Instrumental.
- "Pojkmarsch" composed by Harry Lundahl, Instrumental.
- "Là ci darem la mano" from Don Giovanni composed by Wolfgang Amadeus Mozart, performed by Ragnar Planthaber and Ulla Hodell.
