= 1944 in Iceland =

- Decades: 1920s; 1930s; 1940s; 1950s; 1960s
- See also: Other events of 1944; Timeline of Icelandic history

The following lists events that happened in 1944 in Iceland, the year of its independence.

== Incumbents ==
- Monarch – Kristján X (until 17 June 1944)
- President – Sveinn Björnsson (after 17 June 1944)
- Prime Minister – Björn Þórðarson (until 21 October 1944), Ólafur Thors (after 21 October 1944)

== Events ==
=== February ===
- February 25 – The Republic of Iceland is founded.

=== June ===
- June 17 – Sveinn Björnsson became the first President of Iceland.
