= 1951 in Iceland =

- Decades: 1930s; 1940s; 1950s; 1960s; 1970s
- See also: Other events of 1951; Timeline of Icelandic history

The following article details significant events that occurred in 1951 in Iceland, a year marked by notable political stability and cultural contributions.

== Incumbents ==
During the year 1951, Iceland was led by:

- President – Sveinn Björnsson, who continued to serve as the nation's head of state.
- Prime Minister – Steingrímur Steinþórsson, overseeing the government's operations.

== Events ==
In 1951, Iceland experienced various events that shaped its national and cultural landscape. However, detailed records and descriptions of specific events during this year remain sparse and require further expansion.

== Births ==
Several notable Icelanders were born in 1951, contributing significantly to the nation's cultural and political spheres in later years:

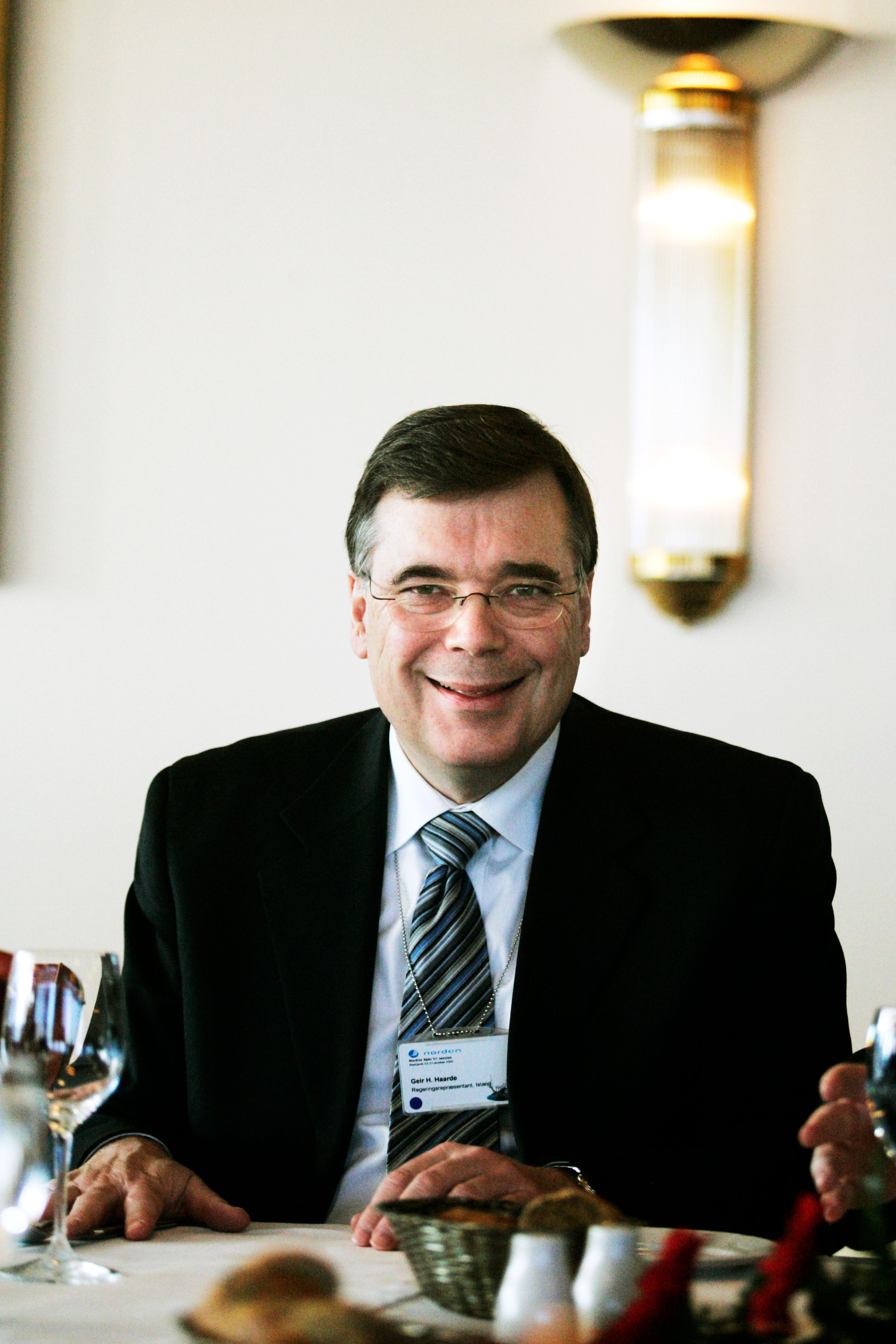
Geir Haarde

- 1 March – Kristinn Sigmundsson, a celebrated singer known for his bass performances.
- 8 April – Geir Haarde, who later became a prominent politician and served as Prime Minister of Iceland.
- 1 May – Álfheiður Ingadóttir, a respected politician who made significant contributions to Icelandic politics.
- 18 July – Thorvaldur Gylfason, an influential economist with a focus on Iceland's economic development.

=== Full date missing ===
- Karólína Eiríksdóttir, a distinguished composer known for her unique contributions to Icelandic music.

== Deaths ==
The records of notable deaths in 1951 are incomplete and further research is needed to provide a comprehensive list.
