= Gunnsteinn Skúlason =

Icelandic handball player (born 1947)

Gunnsteinn Skúlason (born 31 October 1947) is an Icelandic former handball player who competed in the 1972 Summer Olympics.
