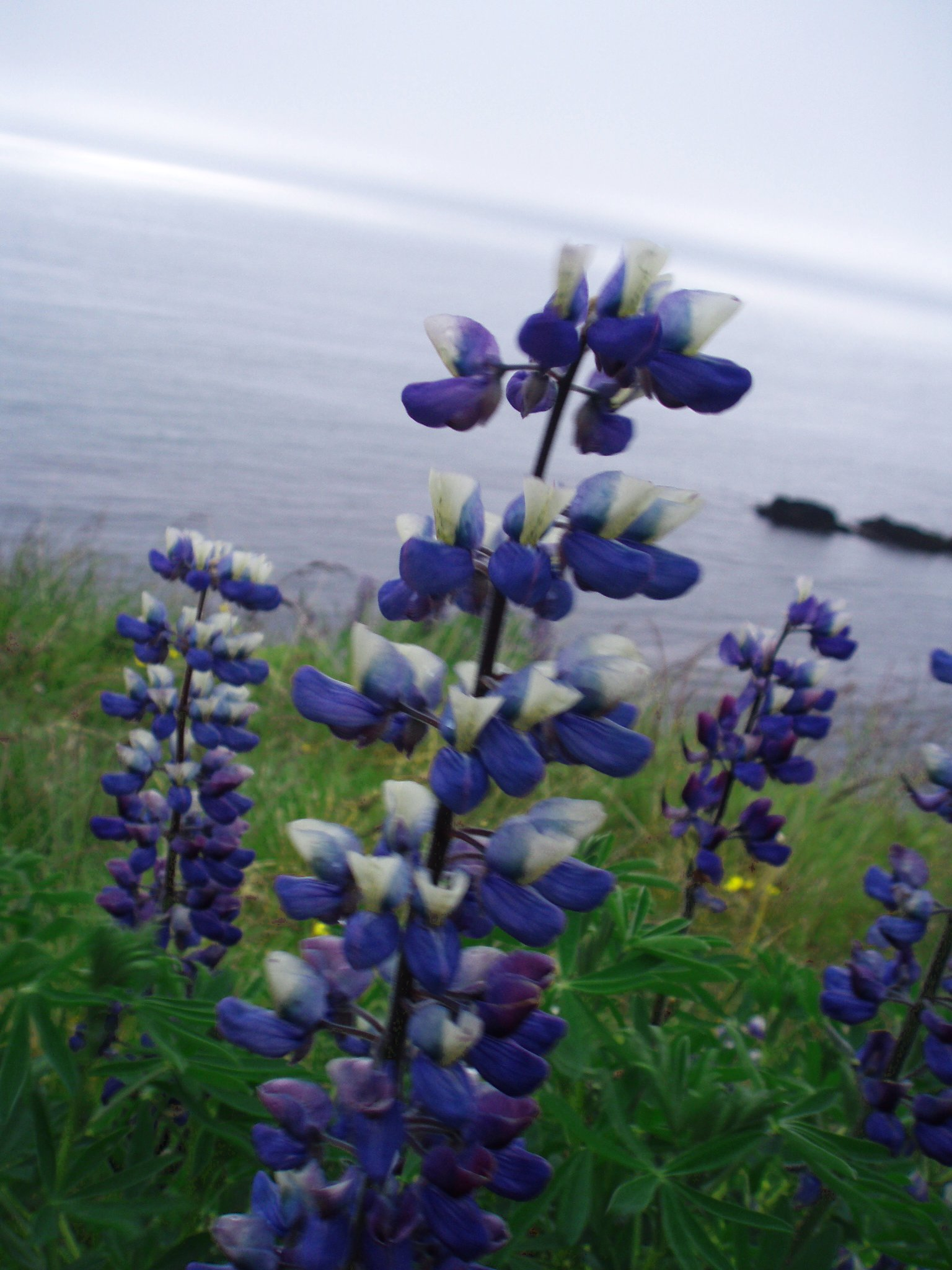
- Nootka lupine growing in Iceland.

Scientific classification
- Kingdom: Plantae
- Clade: Tracheophytes
- Clade: Angiosperms
- Clade: Eudicots
- Clade: Rosids
- Order: Fabales
- Family: Fabaceae
- Subfamily: Faboideae
- Genus: Lupinus
- Species: L. nootkatensis

Binomial name
- Lupinus nootkatensis Donn ex Sims

= Lupinus nootkatensis =

Species of legume

Lupinus nootkatensis, the Nootka lupine, is a perennial plant of the genus Lupinus in the legume family, Fabaceae. It is native to North America and was introduced to Europe in the late 18th century. It grows up to 60 cm tall, and has bright bluish-purple flowers.

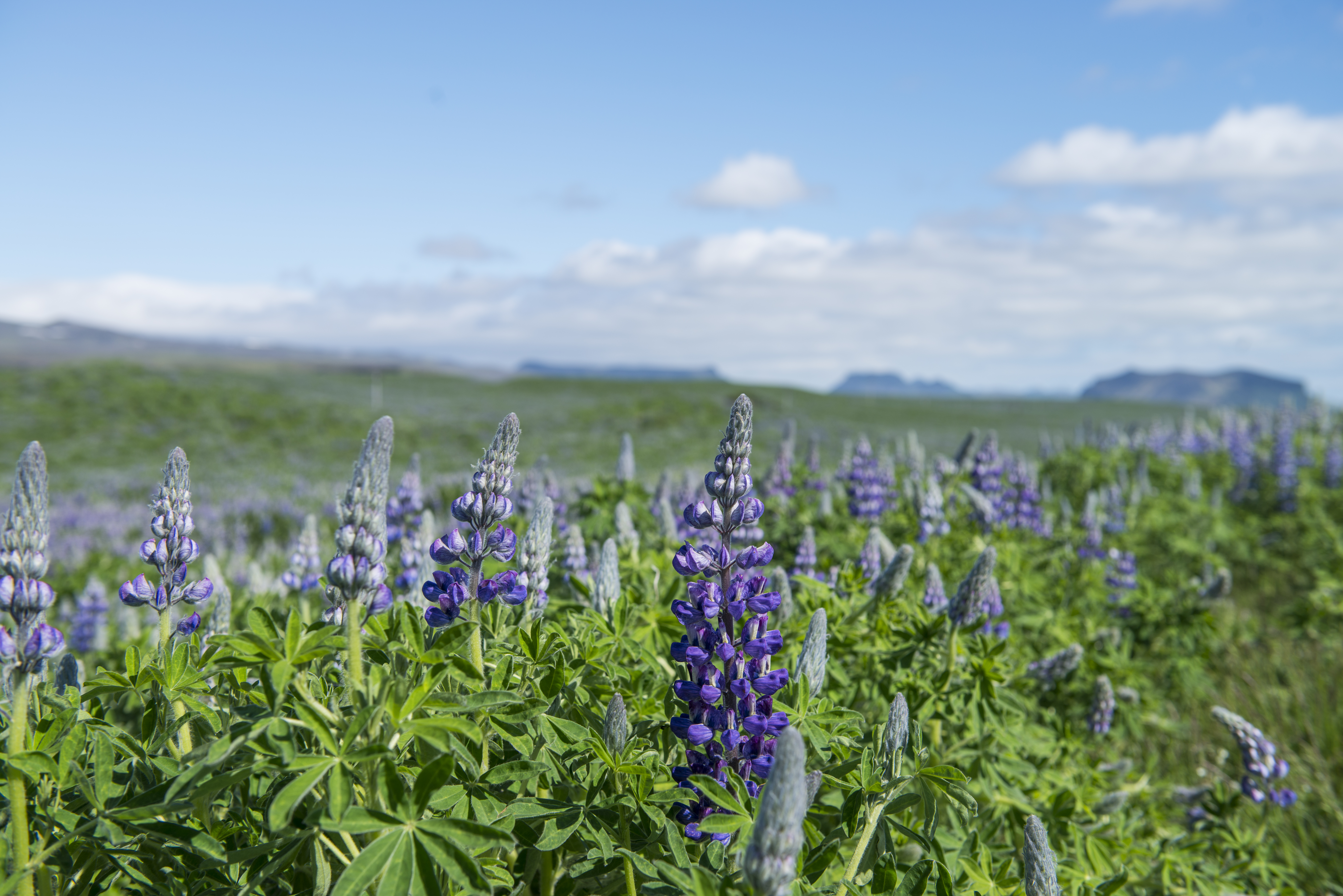
Iceland Nootka Lupin Flower

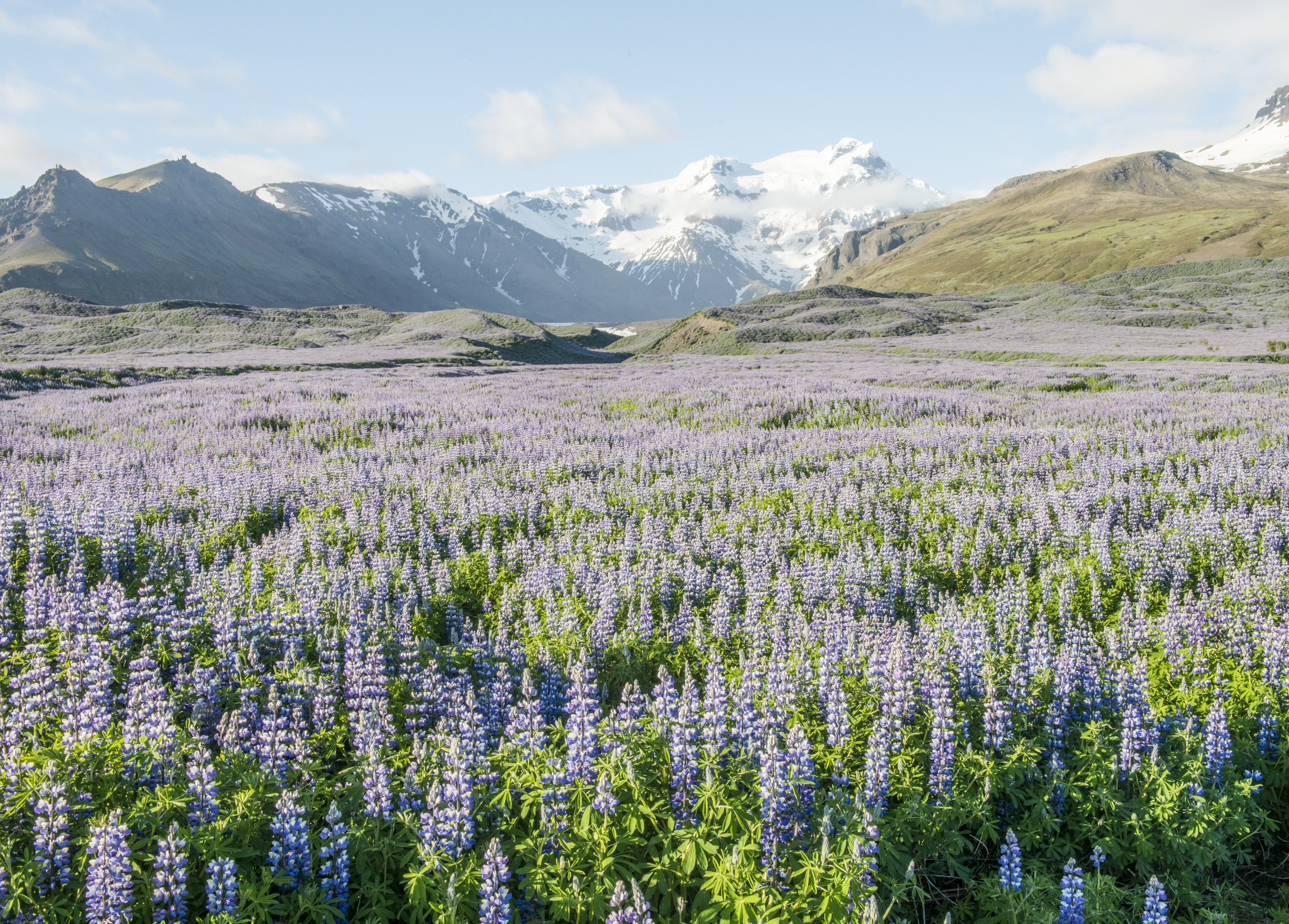
Iceland Nootka Lupin Flower Fields

The Nootka lupine is common on the west coast of North America, and is one of the species from which the garden hybrids are derived, being valued in Britain and other North-European countries for its tolerance of cool, wet summers. In North America, it grows along roadsides, gravel bars, and forest clearings from the Aleutian Islands and Southcentral Alaska, and along the Alaskan panhandle to British Columbia. It is a rigorous self-seeder and can often be seen along roadsides and in open meadows. Their long tap roots make transplanting difficult, so sowing seed is preferable.

== Taxonomy ==
The species was first described as Lupinus nootkatensis in 1810 by James Donn in Botanical Magazine, Vol. 32, Page 1311.

On the Plant List the species is divided in two varieties:

- Lupinus nootkatensis var. fruticosus Sims
- Lupinus nootkatensis var. nootkatensis is the subspecies.

== Toxicity ==
A member of the pea family (Fabaceae), lupines form seeds in fuzzy pods that may be attractive to children. The seeds of the lupine can be toxic, though toxins flush through the system quickly and are not cumulative. However, internal use is not advised.

== Nootka lupine in Iceland ==
In Iceland, the Nootka lupine has been designated an invasive species. The plant was introduced in 1945 by the Icelandic Forest Service to combat erosion, speed up land reclamation and help with reforestation. Dense lupine cover and soil fertility can be gained within a relatively short time span, where the growth of the lupine is not limited by droughts. The plant has spread from the loose, eroded soil in which it was originally planted and is now found throughout the lowlands of Iceland.

The lupine is well suited for reclamation of large, barren areas because of its nitrogen fixation and rapid growth. Furthermore, it has an ability to extract phosphorus from compounds in poor soils. In spite of these good qualities, it has a tendency to become dominant and to colonize already vegetated areas such as dwarf shrub-highlands, where it overtakes the natural flora and threatens biodiversity. The growth of the Nootka lupine has led to public debate about its presence in Iceland, with some praising its improvement of soil through nitrogen fixation and the vibrant colour it brings to Iceland's landscape, and others concerned that it will eradicate native flora, particularly the favoured native crowberry and blueberry patches.

The initial expectation was for the Nootka lupine to retreat gradually along with increased fertility of the soil and give way for other species. This is evident on sites in Iceland where the lupine was introduced early, such as in Heiðmörk near Reykjavík. However, plant succession is towards a forb-rich grassland, often dominated by the invasive species Anthriscus sylvestris, meaning that careful management of lupine is necessary to prevent it from colonizing areas where its presence is not desirable.

== Sources ==
- Accessed 31 October 2008.
- Biological Diversity in Iceland. National Report to the Convention on Biological Diversity. Ministry for the Environment and the Icelandic Institute of Natural History. 2001.

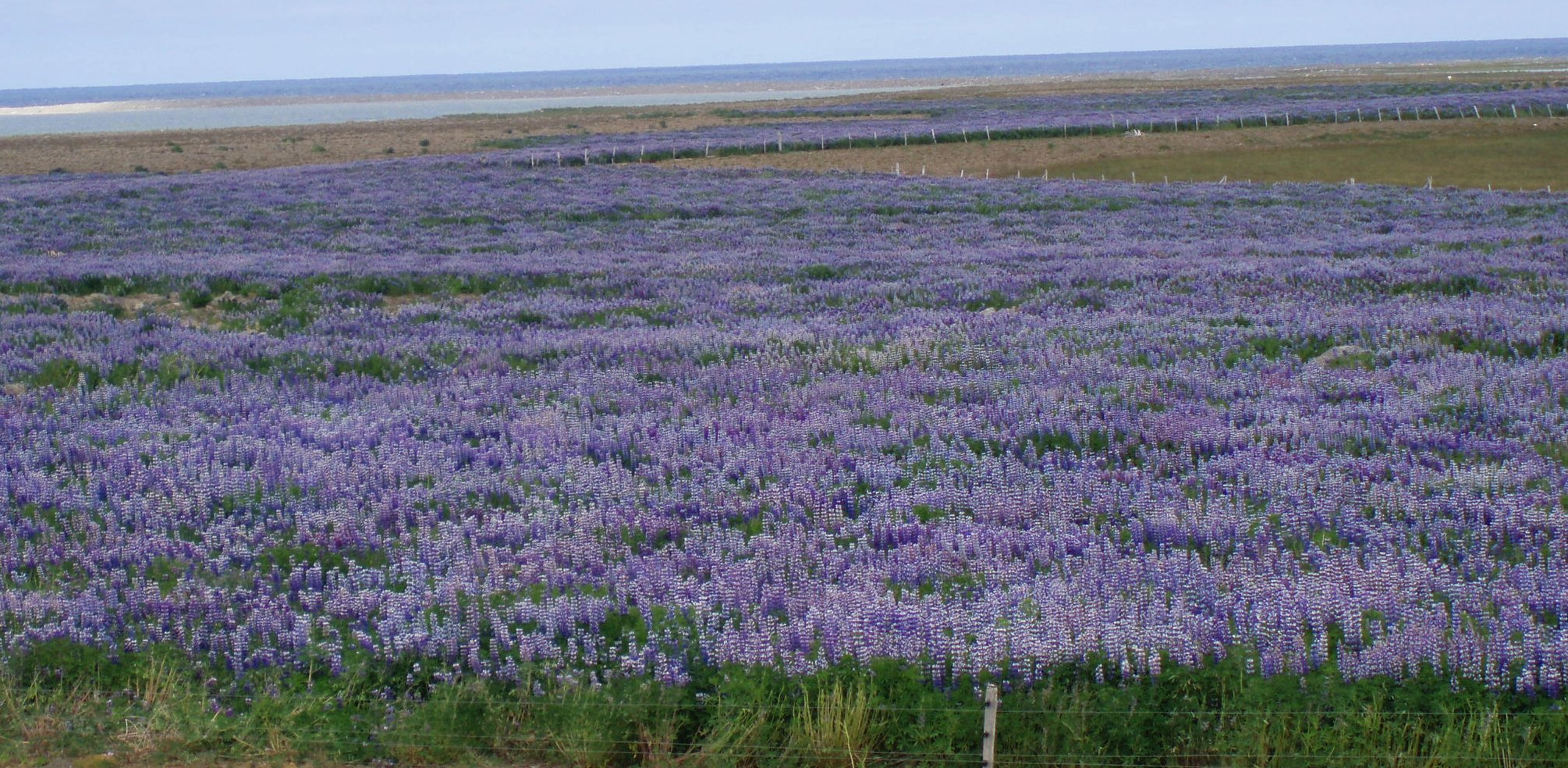
A meadow of Nootka lupine growing in Iceland.
