= Jónína Jónatansdóttir =

Icelandic politician (1869–1946)

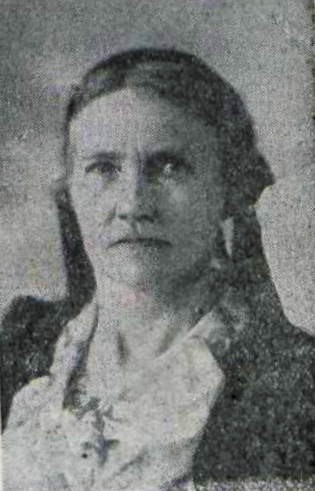

Member of the Reykjavík City Council
- In office 1920–1922

Personal details
- Born: 22 May 1869
- Died: 1 December 1946 (aged 77)
- Party: Social Democratic Party

Jónína Jónatansdóttir (22 May 1869 – 1 December 1946) was a labor leader and local representative in Reykjavík from 1922 to 1924.

== Life and career ==
Jónína was born 22 May 1869 in Gullbringusýsla County in what is now Garðabær. She later moved to Reykjavík where she became a vocal proponent for Women's rights. There, she soon joined the Icelandic Women's Rights Association in 1910.

Her political activities began in 1912, when she started organizing a labor union for women. On 21 April 1913, at a meeting of the Women's Rights Association, she spoke out to say the group needed to do something to improve women's working conditions. Two years later on 25 October 1914, she founded Working Women's Society Progress ("Progress"), the first union for women in the history of Iceland. Jónína Jónatansdóttir was selected as the union's first chair; a position she would remain in for the next twenty years.

The same year she founded Progress, Jónína was placed second on the women's list of municipal candidates for the Reykjavík City Council.

With Progress, Jónína also helped to found the Icelandic Confederation of Labour (ASI) as well as its political arm; the Social Democratic Party (SDP). While serving on its board in 1920, she became the first woman elected to the Reykjavík City Council under the SDP's banner for a term to end in 1922. By 26 May 1931, she was listed fourth among the party's candidates for the Althing (the Icelandic parliament) under Jón Baldvinsson.

On 1 December 1946, Jónína died.
