= 1948 Úrvalsdeild =

Úrvalsdeild
- Season: 1948

The 1948 Úrvalsdeild is a season of top-flight Icelandic football.

== Overview ==
It was contested by 4 teams, and KR won the championship. KR's Ólafur Hannesson was the top scorer with 4 goals.

== Final league table ==
Pos	Team	Pld	W	D	L	GF	GA	GD	Pts
1	KR (C)	3	2	1	0	7	1	+6	5
2	Víkingur	3	1	2	0	5	4	+1	4
3	Valur	3	1	0	2	5	9	−4	2
4	Fram	3	0	1	2	3	6	−3	1

Source: rsssf.com
Rules for classification: 1) points; 2) goal difference; 3) number of goals scored.
(C) Champions

== Results ==
Home \ Away	FRA	KR	VAL	VÍK
Fram		0–2	2–3	1–1
KR			4–0	1–1
Valur				2–3
Víkingur				
