= Edda Andrésdóttir =

Icelandic journalist, news anchor and writer

- Born: 28 December 1952 (age 73)
- Occupations: Journalist, news anchor and writer
- Years active: 1971–present

Edda Andrésdóttir (born 28 December 1952) is an Icelandic journalist, news anchor and writer.

Edda was born to Svava Jónsdóttir, a housewife, and Andrés Magnússon, a foreman at Hvalur hf. She grew up on Kleppsvegur in Reykjavík but spent all summers with her grandmother in Kirkjubær in Vestmannaeyjar. She started working as a journalist for the newspaper Vísir in 1971 and worked there until 1978. Along with her journalism, she produced programs for radio and television. For a while, she was the editor of the magazine Hús og híbýli, a news anchor and television program creator at RÚV and a journalist at Helgarpósturinn. In 1990, Edda started working at Stöð 2 as a news anchor and program creator. On 11 August 2022, she retired from news anchoring.

== Personal life ==
Edda's husband is Stefán Ólafsson, professor of sociology at the University of Iceland. Edda and Stefán have two sons together, and Edda has one son from a previous relationship.

== Bibliography ==
- Á Gljúfrasteini (1984)
- Auður Eir. Sólin kemur alltaf upp á ný (2005)
- Í öðru landi, saga úr lífinu (2007)
- Til Eyja (2013)
