= Sigurbergur Sigsteinsson =

Icelandic handball player (1948-2020)

Personal information
- Nationality: Icelandic
- Born: 10 February 1948 Reykjavík, Iceland
- Died: 29 January 2020 (aged 71)
- Height: 180 cm (71 in)

Sport
- Sport: Handball
- Position: Left wing

Senior clubs
- Years: Team
- –: Knattspyrnufélagið Fram
National team
Years	Team	Apps	(Gls)
–	Iceland	78	(53)

Sigurbergur Sigsteinsson (10 February 1948 – 29 January 2020) was an Icelandic handball player and association football player. He competed in the 1972 Summer Olympics on the Icelandic handball team.

He won both Icelandic football and handball Championships.
