= Þór Whitehead =

Icelandic historian (born 1943)

Þór Whitehead (Thor Whitehead) (born 19 August 1943) is an Icelandic historian. He is currently a professor at the University of Iceland.

Thor has written extensively on the history of Iceland during World War II and the Cold War. His best known work is the multi-volume series Ísland í síðari heimsstyrjöld (Iceland in the Second World War). He has also written about other episodes in Icelandic history, such as the Icelandic government's rejection of Jewish refugees during the war, and the racist policies of banning black soldiers from the American-garrisoned Naval Air Station Keflavik.

== Education ==
Thor received a BA degree from the University of Iceland, an MA from the University of Georgia and his DPhil from Oxford University.

== Academic career ==
- Research lecturer, University of Iceland, 1978–1981
- Professor of history, University of Iceland, Reykjavík, Iceland, 1981-
- Director, Institute of History, University of Iceland, 1983–1985
- Fulbright Research Fellow and Visiting Scholar, School of Advanced International Studies, Johns Hopkins University, Washington, DC, United States, 1986
- Humboldt Fellow, Militärgeschichtliches Forschungsamt der Bundeswehr, Freiburg, Germany, 1986–1988
- Dean, Faculty of Arts, University of Iceland, 1989–1991
- Visiting Research Professor, Université Paul-Valéry, Montpellier III, Montpellier, France, 1992–1993
- Chairman, Department of History, 1994–1995
- Humboldt Fellow, Militärgeschichtliches Forschungsamt der Bundeswehr, Freiburg, Germany, 1996–1997
- Visiting Research Professor, Université Paul-Valéry, Montpellier III, Montpellier, France, 2002–2003, 2005–2006,
- Chairman, Department of History and Archaeology, University of Iceland 2006–2007

== Publications ==
- Whitehead, Þór (1979). Kommúnistahreyfingin á Íslandi 1921-1934 [The Communist Movement in Iceland, 1921–1934] (in Icelandic).
- Whitehead, Þór (1980–1999). Ísland í sídari heimsstyrjöld [Iceland in the Second World War] (in Icelandic). Vol. I–IV. The Icelandic Literary Prize, 1995.
- Whitehead, Þór (1988). Íslandsaevintýri Himmlers 1935-1937 [Himmler's Iceland Adventure 1935-1937] (in Icelandic).
- Whitehead, Þór (1998). The Ally Who Came in from the Cold. A Survey of Icelandic Foreign Policy 1946-1956.
- Whitehead, Þór (2002). Ísland í hers höndum [Iceland and the Allied Military Presence. Pictures from a War 1939-1945] (in Icelandic). The Icelandic Booksellers Prize, 2002.

== Sources ==
- Who is Who in the World 2009.
