= Ingibjörg H. Bjarnason =

Icelandic politician, suffragist, schoolteacher and gymnast

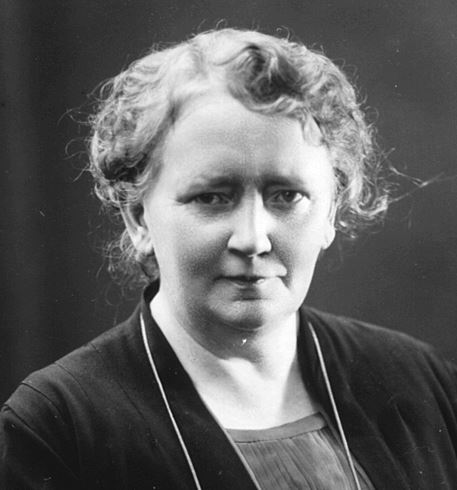

Member of the Althing
- In office 1922–1927

Personal details
- Born: 14 December 1867; Thingeyri, Iceland
- Died: 30 October 1941 (aged 73)
- Political party: Independent (until 1924); Conservative

Ingibjörg H. Bjarnason (14 December 1867 – 30 October 1941) was an Icelandic politician, suffragist, schoolteacher and gymnast. She was the first woman to become a member of the Althing, the parliament of Iceland.

== Early life and education ==
Ingibjörg was born in Thingeyri, Iceland, in 1867 to Hakon Bjarnason and Johanna Kristin Þorleifsdóttir, and was one of five children. As a teenager, she moved to Reykjavík after her father died and attended Kvennaskólinn (the Reykjavík Women's College). She graduated from the college in 1882 and relocated to Denmark to study gymnastics, making her the first Icelander to do so. She returned to Reykjavík in 1893 to teach gymnastics at a children's school, and in 1903 she returned to the Women's College as a teacher. She became the school principal in 1906 and held the position for 35 years until her death.

== Political career ==
She first became involved in the women's suffrage movement in Iceland in 1894. In 1915, when Icelandic women won the right to vote, Ingibjörg was chosen by a women's organisation to address parliament and present a celebratory speech, and was elected the head of a committee which raised funds to build a hospital, Landspítali (the National University Hospital) to commemorate the suffragists' win. She led the Women's Slate, a precursor to the feminist Women's List political party, and in 1922 was elected to the Althing. She thereby became the first woman to sit in the Icelandic parliament. She initially ran as an independent member, but in 1924 she joined the Conservative Party and stayed in office as a Conservative member until 1927. In her political career, she promoted women's and children's rights, although she never married or had children.

== Career after politics ==
After retiring from politics, she remained active in the Icelandic women's liberation movement, and in 1930 she became the founding chairperson of the women's organisation Kvenfélagasambands Íslands. However, she faced criticism for some women for her alignment with the Conservative Party, for supporting causes such as the establishment of a home economics school, and for suggesting that Icelandic women had achieved full equality when they received the right to vote in 1915. She also served on the Landsbanki committee from 1928 to 1932, and was part of the Icelandic Education Council from 1928 to 1934. She died in October 1941.

== Legacy ==
In November 2011, 70 years after Ingibjörg's death, it was announced that a vote had passed in the Reykjavík City Council to construct a permanent memorial in Reykjavík in her honour. A celebration was held in the Althing in July 2012 to celebrate the 90th anniversary of Ingibjörg's election.
