= Titti Sjöblom =

Swedish pop singer (born 1949)

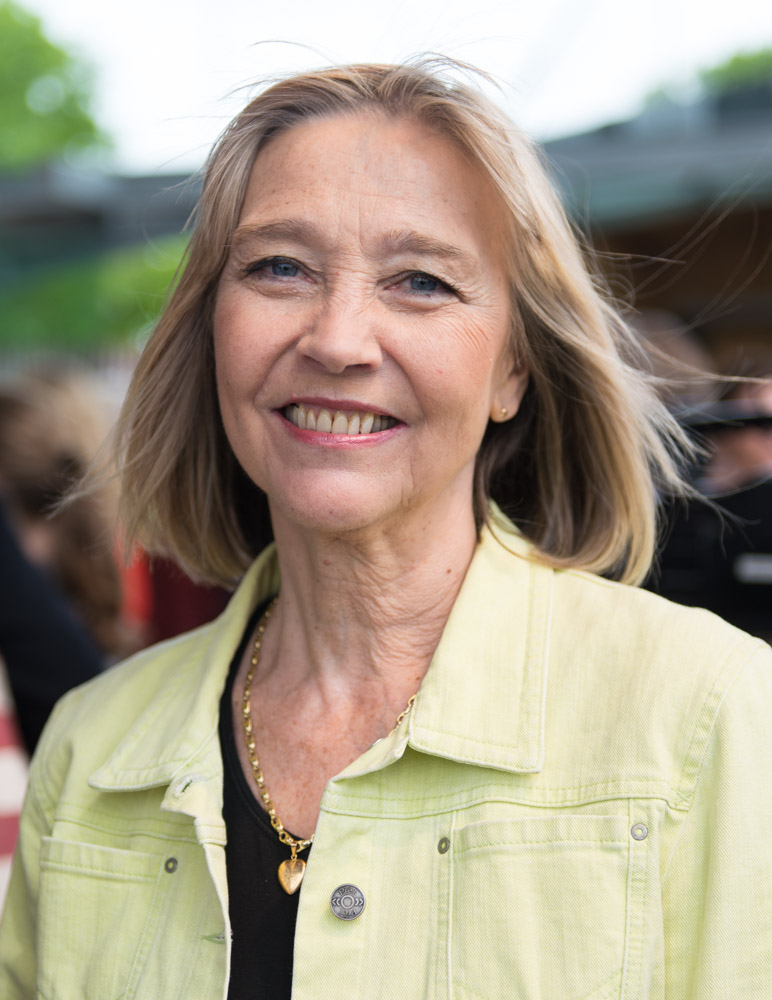
- Sjöblom in 2015

Background information
- Born: Titti Sigrid Renée Eliasson Sjöblom; 29 August 1949 (age 76); Stockholm, Sweden
- Occupation: Singer
- Years active: 1951–present
- Musical career
- Genres: Schlager; pop
- Instrument: Vocals

Titti Sigrid Renée Eliasson Sjöblom (born 29 August 1949) is a Swedish pop singer. She is the daughter of singer Alice Babs and director Nils Ivar Sjöblom. She participated at Melodifestivalen 1974 with the song "Fröken Ur-sång", ending up in fourth place. Her first dinner shows and folk park tours with Charlie Norman took place during the mid-1970s.

== Discography ==
- Sjung med oss, mamma. Alice Babs, Titti och Torsten Tegnér sjunger Alice Tegnér. recorded 1963
- Titti Sjöblom special. 1989
- All of us. The Butlers med refrängsångerskan Titti Sjöblom. 1992
- Får jag lov ... eller ska vi dansa först with Arne Domnérus orkester. Vocalist at four songs. 1994
- För själ och hjärta med Ehrling Eliasson. 1999
- Tittis bästa. Compilation album 2003
- Sjung med oss mamma. Vol. 2. Toner i fyra generationer with Alice Babs, Ehrling Eliasson, Nils & Dennis Breitholtz. 2003
- Världsarvets serenad. Hyllning till Höga Kusten with Ehrling Eliasson. 2006
- Titti & Ehrling sjunger Kai Gullmar with Ehrling Eliasson. 2008
