= Jóhanna Einarsdóttir =

Icelandic academic

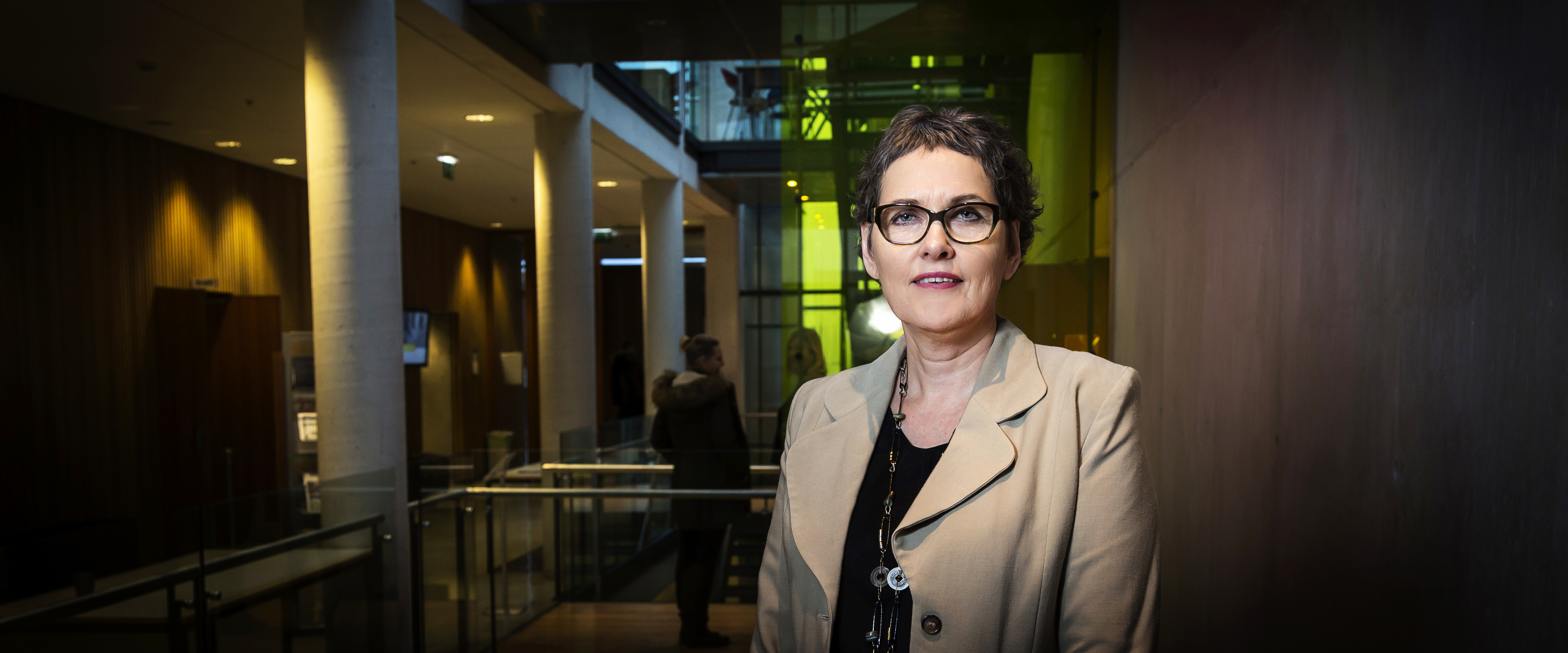
- Born: 11 November 1952 (age 73)
- Occupation: professor of Early Childhood Education at the University of Iceland

Jóhanna Einarsdóttir (born 11 November 1952) is a professor of Early Childhood Education at the University of Iceland.

== Education and recognitions ==
Jóhanna received a teacher's certificate from the Teachers College of Iceland in 1973 and a matriculation examination from the same school a year later. She then completed a BS in Pedagogy from the University of Illinois in 1976 and a master's degree in Education Science from the same school in 1977. She completed a PhD in Early Childhood Education from the University of Illinois in 2000. Jóhanna has participated for years in shaping the Icelandic education system as a director, teacher, and researcher as well as an adviser on policy formulation.

Jóhanna was the first Icelander to complete a PhD in Early Childhood Education and has been the only professor in that field in Iceland since 2006. She is a pioneer in research in early childhood education in both Iceland and the Nordic countries. In 2017, the University of Oulu in Finland awarded Jóhanna an honorary doctorate for scientific contributions to research on early childhood education and the ethics of research on young children. In 2018, Jóhanna received the Distinguished Alumni Award from the University of Illinois for her contribution to research on early childhood education. The award goes to the university's former students who have excelled internationally in their field of knowledge.

== Administration and leadership ==
Jóhanna built up and for 10 years was in charge of the Continuing Education Department of the Icelandic College for Pre-School Teachers. When the pre-school teachers programme was formally moved to the university level, the Icelandic College for Pre-School Teachers merged with the Iceland University of Education in 1998, she was hired to head the programme. She therefore directed formulation of the university programme for pre-school teachers. In 2007, in accordance with a new research organisation scheme, she directed the founding of the first research institution at the Iceland University of Education, Centre for Research in Early Childhood Education (RannUng), and supervised it for years. The Centre for Research has become a forum for research and development in Iceland's preschools as well as for young researchers, master's and doctoral students to work in collaboration with experienced researchers.

Jóhanna was Dean of the University of Iceland's School of Education 2013–2018. Her term saw extensive improvements to the teachers curriculum after evaluations of it and the merger of the Iceland University of Education with the University of Iceland. The goals of the changes were to improve the curriculum and make it more attractive to prospective students. Noteworthy aspects of those changes were the transfer of the curriculum for physical training instructors to Reykjavik and changed departmentalisation, resulting in a much more diverse teachers curriculum.

== Teaching ==
Jóhanna has rights to teach at all levels of schooling. She worked for 10 years as a teacher of teacher training at the Experimental Lab School of the Iceland University of Education. She led innovation and development for the youngest grades, where democracy in schooling, creative work and emphasis on students’ strengths had priority. She has taught student teachers (with short pauses) since 1977. As a professor at the School of Education, she has stood for innovation in teaching methods, in collaboration with foreign universities. An example is a course for doctoral students in early childhood education in the Nordic countries. A grant from Nord Forsk supported it and a joint course at the University of Gothenburg for master's students. Jóhanna has been a guest teacher at foreign universities. Examples include Charles Sturt University in Australia, the University of Oulu in Finland, and the University of Strathclyde in Scotland.

== Policy development ==
Jóhanna has worked for years on policy development in education. She has participated in shaping policy on teachers curricula for about four decades and has directed various committees and councils regarding this. One example is the Iceland University of Education's Science Board that forged the school's research policy. She has taken part in policy formulation on education for the State and municipalities. She helped formulate the policy of the Ministry of Education, Science and Culture regarding 6-year-old children when that age group was transferred to primary school (Pre-school Committee). She took part in work on the National Curriculum of Compulsory Schools in 1989 and the National Curriculum of Pre-Schools in 2011. She now directs the Policy Development Committee of the Ministry of Education, Science and Culture on the education of children with native languages other than Icelandic.

== Research ==
Jóhanna’s research has focused particularly on education of the youngest children, connections between school levels, teachers of the youngest children and education of pre-school teachers. Along with collaborating people in the Centre for Research in Early Childhood Education, she has taken part in many studies in collaboration with domestic and foreign parties.

She has published the findings of her research in both Icelandic and international professional journals. Several of those are cited frequently often. They include the article "Research with children: Methodological and ethical challenges" that was published in the European Early Childhood Education Research Journal in 2007. Another much-cited article is "Playschool in pictures: Children’s photographs as a research method", published in Early Child Development and Care in 2005. She also collaborated with Sue Dockett and Bob Perry at Charles Sturt University in Australia on the article "Making meaning: Children’s perspectives expressed through drawings". The articles above critically discuss procedures and methodology in researching young children.

Other writings drawing attention are articles on research in Icelandic pre-schools. See the article "Children‘s and parents‘ perspectives on the purposes of playschool in Iceland", published in the International Journal of Educational Research 2008. Jóhanna has also written about Nordic pre-schools. The most noteworthy example is the book Nordic Childhoods and Early Education: Philosophy, Research, Policy and Practice in Denmark, Finland, Iceland, Norway, and Sweden, which she edited in collaboration with Dr. Judith Wagner. This book was one of the first academic works about Nordic pre-school research. Jóhanna has edited eight academic books and three theme issues of respected academic journals on her specialty.

Jóhanna is on the Board of Directors of the European Early Childhood Education Research Association.

== International collaboration ==
Jóhanna has participated in extensive international research collaboration. Below are several examples:

- Enhancing Transition Practices in Early Childhood Education (TRAP). Erasmus+ grant 2018–2020.
- Politics of belonging: Promoting children's inclusion in education settings across borders 2018-2022. Nord Forsk grant.
- Values Education in Nordic Preschools: Basis of Education for Tomorrow. Nord Forsk grant.
- Pedagogy of Educational Transitions. Marie Curie grant.
- Early Years Transition Programme. Erasmus grant.
- "BE-CHILD - Build a more inclusive society supporting ECEC educators for the development of socio emotional competences in pre-school children" Erasmus grant.
