= Herbert Guðmundsson =

Icelandic pop music singer-songwriter (born 1953)

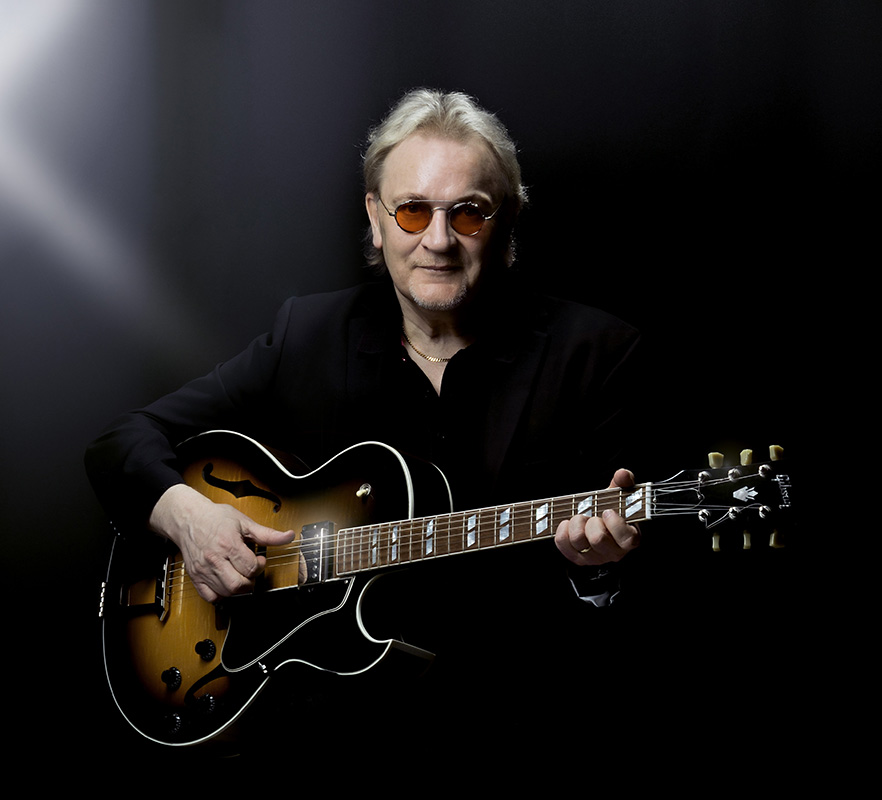
- Herbert Guðmundsson in 2012

Background information
- Born: 15 December 1953 (age 72); Reykjavík, Iceland
- Genres: Pop; rock; Icelandic
- Occupations: Musician; guitarist; singer-songwriter
- Instruments: Guitar; vocals
- Years active: 1965–present
- Label: HG
- Website: www.herbert.is

Herbert "Hebbi" Guðmundsson (born 15 December 1953) is an Icelandic pop music singer-songwriter. He is best known for his songs "Svaraðu", "Time", "Hollywood" and "Can‘t Walk Away", which reached No. 1 on the Icelandic listings chart in 1985.

== Life and career ==
Herbert Guðmundsson first became widely known in Iceland when offered to sing with the band Tilvera in 1971, which was one of the most popular bands in Iceland at the time along with Trúbrot and Ævintýri. Herbert took part in the first staging of Jesus Christ Superstar in Iceland in 1972, and soon after the staging of Faust at the National Theatre of Iceland and fronted various Icelandic bands, including Elífð, Tilvera, Stofnþel, Eik, Pelican, Dínamít and the band Kan.

Guðmundsson released his debut album Á ströndinni in 1977 with the band Eik. Although he released his first album then, it has been stated that his career officially started in 1965 when he was only 12 years old in a school band. The band Kan recorded the album Í Ræktinni with Herbert including the songs "Megi sá draumur" and "Vestfjarðaróður" in 1984.

In 1985 Herbert embarked upon a solo career with his third album Dawn of the Human Revolution. He released the first single "Can't Walk Away", which instantly became a major hit in Iceland and topped the charts for a couple of weeks.

== Discography ==
=== Studio albums ===
- Á Ströndinni, with the band Eik, 1977
- Í Ræktinni, with the band Kan, 1984
- Dawn of the Human Revolution, the album containing the hit "Can‘t Walk Away", 1985
- Transmit, a 12" record, 1986
- Time Flies, 1987
- Being Human, 1993
- Dawn of the Human Revolution, republished on CD, 1996
- Ný Spor Á Íslenskri Tungu, 2001
- Spegill Sálarinnar – Open Your Eyes, 2008
- Tree Of Life, 2011
- Nýtt Upphaf, 2012
- Flakkað um ferilinn, 2015
- Starbright, 2018

=== Compilation albums ===
- FAITH – all the best known songs of Herbert with four new ones 1998
- Flakkað um Ferilinn, 2013

=== DVD releases ===
- Concert at the Icelandic Opera, 2010
- DVD Can't Walk Away documentary about the career of Herbert Guðmundsson, 2017

== Herbert on Youtube ==
- Twenty One – a song written by Herbert performed with Eik

One of the first songs written by Herbert – Twenty One

- Can't Walk Away – Herbert's first mega hit in Iceland
  - CAN'T WALK AWAY
- Hollywood – Herbert wrote this song and then went to Los Angeles to shoot a music video.
  - Hollywood on YouTube
- Time – A song Herbert wrote with his son
  - TIME
- Camilia – a cover made by Herbert of a Swedish song
  - Camilia
- Magic Feeling – Herbert put on the spot in an Icelandic TV program
  - Magic Feeling
