= 1939 in Iceland =

- Decades: 1910s; 1920s; 1930s; 1940s; 1950s
- See also: Other events in 1939 · Timeline of Icelandic history

The following lists events that happened in 1939 in Iceland.

== Incumbents ==
- Monarch - Kristján X
- Prime Minister – Hermann Jónasson

== Events ==
- Iceland in World War II
- Althing session
- Sigurgeir Sigurðsson became the eighth Bishop of Iceland, succeeding Jón Helgason.

== Births ==
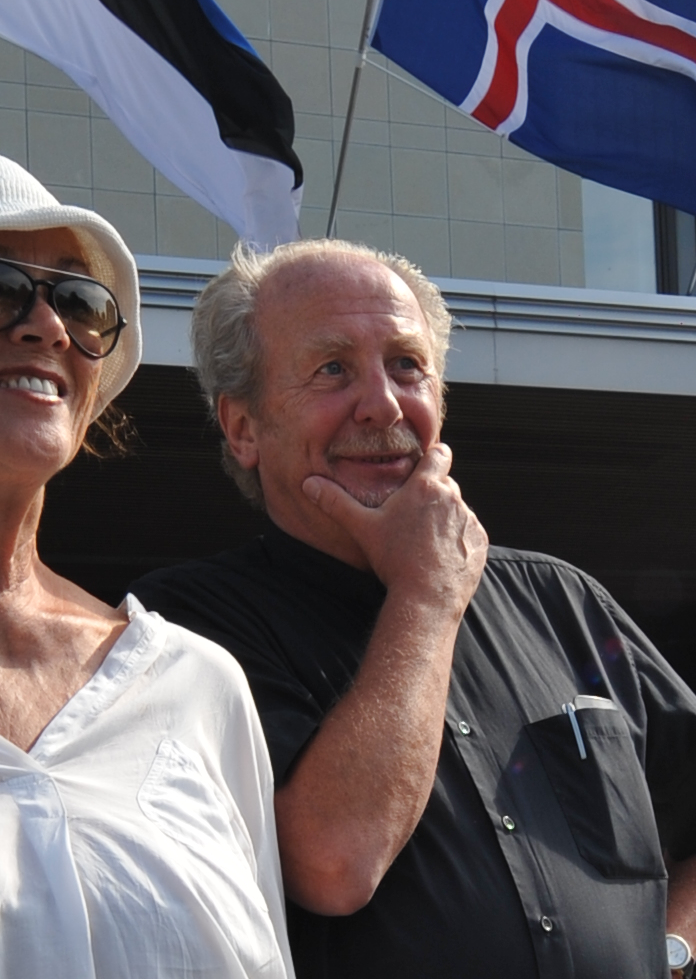
Jón Baldvin Hannibalsson

- 21 February – Jón Baldvin Hannibalsson, politician and diplomat (d. 2017)
- 14 July – Rúnar Guðmannsson, footballer
- 27 September – Guðrún Kristín Magnúsdóttir, artist and writer
- 20 October– Kristín Halldórsdóttir, politician (d. 2016).
- 7 November – Eiður Svanberg Guðnason, politician.
- 29 October – Guðmundur G. Þórarinsson, politician.
