= 1940 in Iceland =

- Decades: 1920s; 1930s; 1940s; 1950s; 1960s
- See also: Other events in 1940 · Timeline of Icelandic history

The following lists events that happened in 1940 in Iceland.

== Incumbents ==
- Monarch - Kristján X
- Prime Minister – Hermann Jónasson

== Events ==
- 9 April - Iceland takes full control of its foreign policy following the German invasion of Denmark.
- 10 May - The British Invasion of Iceland begins.

== Births ==
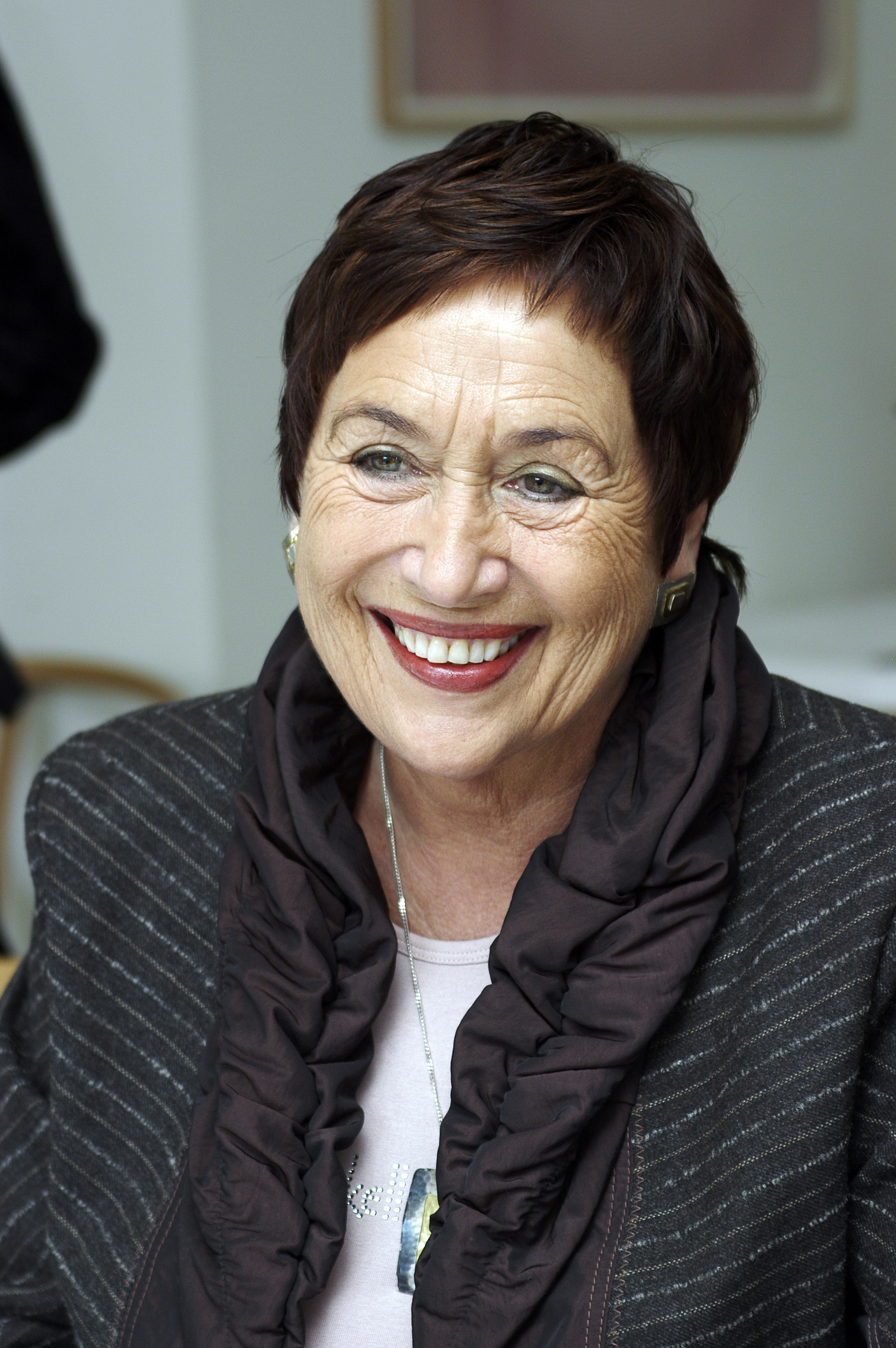
Rannveig Guðmundsdóttir

- 11 January – Örn Steinsen, footballer
- 15 September – Rannveig Guðmundsdóttir, politician.
- 16 September – Ómar Ragnarsson, media personality
- 11 December – Fríða Á. Sigurðardóttir, writer (d. 2010)
