= Elmar Geirsson =

Icelandic footballer

Personal information
- Date of birth: 25 July 1948 (age 78)
- Place of birth: Reykjavík, Iceland
- Position: Midfielder

Senior career*
Years	Team	Apps	(Gls)
1967–1976	Fram		
- Hertha Zehlendorf
1976–1977	SV Eintracht Trier 05	10	(1)
–1980	KA		

International career
1967–1980	Iceland	23	(2)
- * Club domestic league appearances and goals

Ernst Elmar Geirsson (born 25 July 1948) is an Icelandic former professional footballer who played as a midfielder.

== Club career ==
Geirsson started at Fram and later was successful in Germany with Hertha Zehlendorf and SV Eintracht Trier 05.

== International career ==
He made his debut for Iceland in 1967 and went on to win 23 caps, scoring two goals.
