= 1950 Geysir air crash =

Plane crash in Iceland

Coordinates: 65°02′N 16°33′W

Accident
- Date: 14 September 1950
- Summary: Navigational error in adverse weather conditions
- Site: Bárðarbunga, Iceland

Aircraft
- Aircraft type: Douglas C-54 Skymaster
- Operator: Loftleiðir
- Registration: TF-RVC
- Flight origin: Luxembourg City
- Stopover: Reykjavík
- Destination: New York
- Crew: 6
- Fatalities: 0
- Injuries: 6
- Survivors: 6

The 1950 Geysir air crash (Icelandic: Geysisslysið [ˈceiːsɪsˌstlɪːsɪθ], "the Geysir accident") was a plane crash that occurred on 14 September 1950 when a Douglas C-54 Skymaster, christened Geysir, crashed on the southeastern parts of Bárðarbunga on the Vatnajökull glacier in Iceland. The crew of six survived the crash but had to wait several days until they were found by rescuers and brought off the glacier. The difficulties that arose during the rescue mission directly led to the creations of specialized air rescue units in Iceland.

== Crash and rescue ==
Geysir was owned by Loftleiðir which had initially bought the airplane for international flights with passengers in 1948. Due to the economic conditions in Iceland, Loftleiðir canceled some passenger flights in 1950 and was using this particular aircraft for freight transport for Seaboard & Western Airlines. On 14 September, Geysir was inbound from Luxembourg City with a planned stopover in Reykjavík before heading on to its final destination of New York. En route to Reykjavík, Geysir drifted considerably off course and around 22:50, one of its wings clipped the Bárðarbunga glacial plateau, resulting in the aircraft crash-landing onto the glacier. The crew of six survived the crash but were unable to contact anyone as the plane's radio equipment was destroyed. When Geysir failed to arrive to Reykjavík and no contact could be made, a nationwide search for the plane started. Two and a half days after the crash, the crew managed to reach the emergency transmitter in the plane's rubber liferaft and send out a distress call. It was picked up by the Icelandic Coast Guard vessel Ægir, which was then off Skálar in Langanes. The first message read: "Location unknown, everyone alive." Later messages indicated that the plane had crashed on a glacier and that the crew had heard search planes fly over the crash site the day before. The same day, the search and rescue plane Vestfirðingur found the wreckage and relayed its position. A specially equipped Douglas C-47 Dakota from the United States Air Force was sent from Greenland to aid in the rescue. The Skytrain landed on the glacier and took on the crew of Geysir, but failed several attempts to take-off again. A land based rescue expedition from Akureyri was also organized and reached the crash site the following day, and rescued both crews from the glacier.

== Cause ==
The Air Accident Investigation Board concluded in its investigation that the root cause of the accident was a navigational error. Two of Geysir's crew, the aeronautical engineer and one of the pilots, as well as the air traffic controller on duty that night, were prosecuted for violating the Aviation Act laws and General Penal Code. The air traffic controller was acquitted but the aeronautical engineer was found guilty and lost his flight license for life and the pilot was fined 4.000 ISK. The investigation was heavily criticized as it did not look into whether the equipment on the plane had failed, whether the transmissions of the LORAN stations were deficient at the date of the crash, or whether the weather had any effect on the plane drifting of course. Meteorologist Trausti Jónsson later concluded from available data that an unusual, sharp and unexpected wind string for that time of the year carried the plane from its course, with the result that it came to land close to Berufjörður instead of Mýrdalur.

== Aftermath ==
The problems that arose during the rescue operations directly led to the creations of specialized air rescue units in the country. The first one, Air Ground Rescue Team of Reykjavík (Icelandic:Flugbjörgunarsveitin Reykjavík), was founded on 24 November 1950.

A month after the crash, the Air Force attempted to rescue the stranded Dakota from the glacier but had to abandon the mission due to bad weather. The following year, the plane, which was valued at 250.000 dollars, was sold to Loftleiðir for a reported 700 dollars. In April 1951, Loftleiðir set out a rescue party that spent 21-days digging up the plane from under 7 meters of snow and bringing it down from the glacier. The plane was christened Jökull and flew for Loftleiðir for several years.

== In film ==
- Biðin langa: A documentary about the crash that premiered on RÚV in 1987.
- Geysisslysið á Vatnajökli: A documentary about the crash by Eðvarð Sigurgeirsson.
- Staðarákvörðun óþekkt: hálf öld liðin frá Geysisslysinu: A 2000 documentary by Sagafilm covering the accident that was nominated for the Edda Awards as the best documentary of the year.
