= Alice Babs =

Swedish jazz and schlager singer (1924–2014)

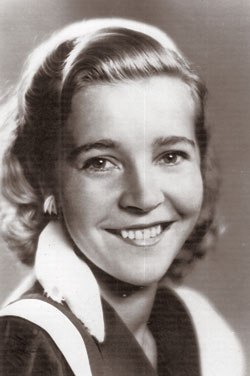
- Nilson in 1940

Background information
- Born: Hildur Alice Nilson; 26 January 1924; Kalmar, Sweden
- Died: 11 February 2014 (aged 90) Stockholm, Sweden
- Genres: Jazz; schlager
- Occupations: Singer, actress
- Years active: 1939–2004
- Labels: Sonora (Sonora (skivbolag)); His Master's Voice; Cupol (Cupol); Metronome (Metronome (skivbolag)); Polydor; Belter (Discos Belter); Decca; Warner Bros.; Telestar; Swedish Society Discofil

Hildur Alice Nilson (26 January 1924 – 11 February 2014), known by her stage name Alice Babs, was a Swedish singer. She worked in a wide number of genres – Swedish folklore, Elizabethan songs and opera. While she was best known internationally as a jazz singer, Babs also competed as Sweden's first annual competition entrant in the Eurovision Song Contest 1958. In 1972 she was named Sweden's Royal Court Singer, the first non-opera singer as such.

== Career ==
After making her breakthrough in the film Swing it, magistern! ('Swing It, Teacher!', 1940), she appeared in more than a dozen Swedish-language films. Despite being cast as the well-behaved, good-hearted, cheerful girl, the youth culture forming with Babs as its icon caused outrage among members of the older generation. A vicar called the Babs cult the "foot and mouth disease of cultural life".

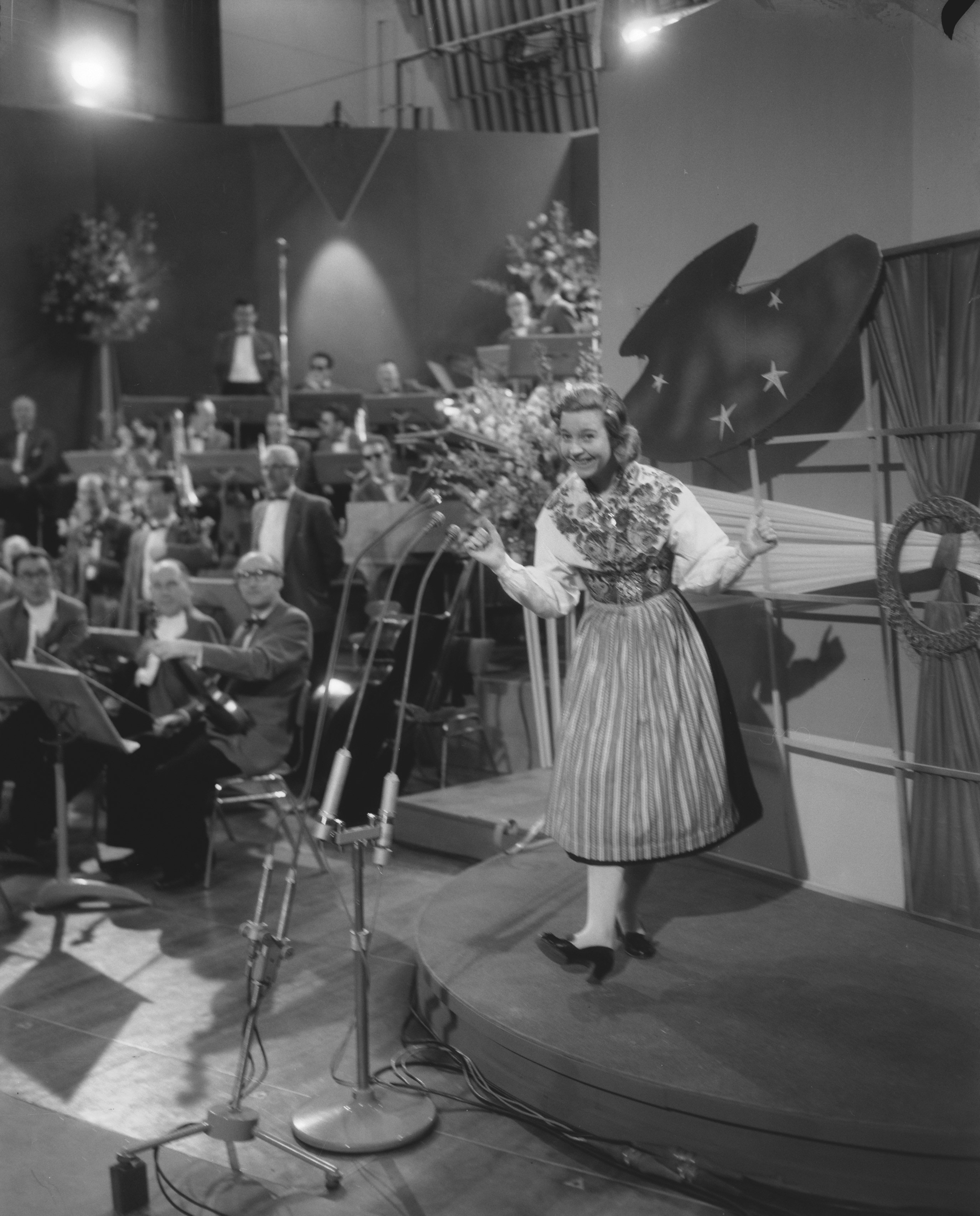
Nilson in the Eurovision Song Contest 1958, representing Sweden

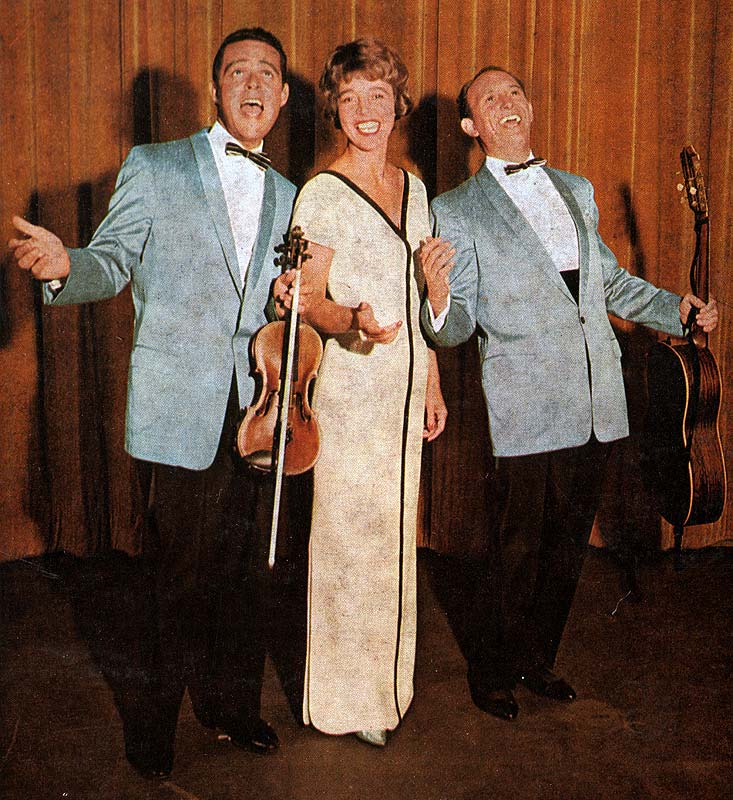
Nilson (centre) with the rest of the Swe-Danes in 1961

A long and productive period of collaboration with Duke Ellington began in 1963. Among other works, Babs participated in performances of Ellington's second and third Sacred Concerts which he had written originally for her. Her voice had a range of more than three octaves; Ellington said that when she was not available to sing the parts that he had written for her, he had to use three different singers.

In 1963, her recording of "After You've Gone" (Fontana) reached No. 29 on the British New Musical Express charts.

In 1972, she contributed to the recording of "Auntie", a Dutch song commemorating the beginning of British Broadcasting Corporation's radio broadcasts 50 years before.

== Personal life ==
In 1943, Babs married Nils Ivar Sjöblom (1919–2011). Their three children are Lilleba Sjöblom Lagerbäck (born 1945), Lars-Ivar (Lasse) Sjöblom (born 1948), and Titti Sjöblom (born 1949).

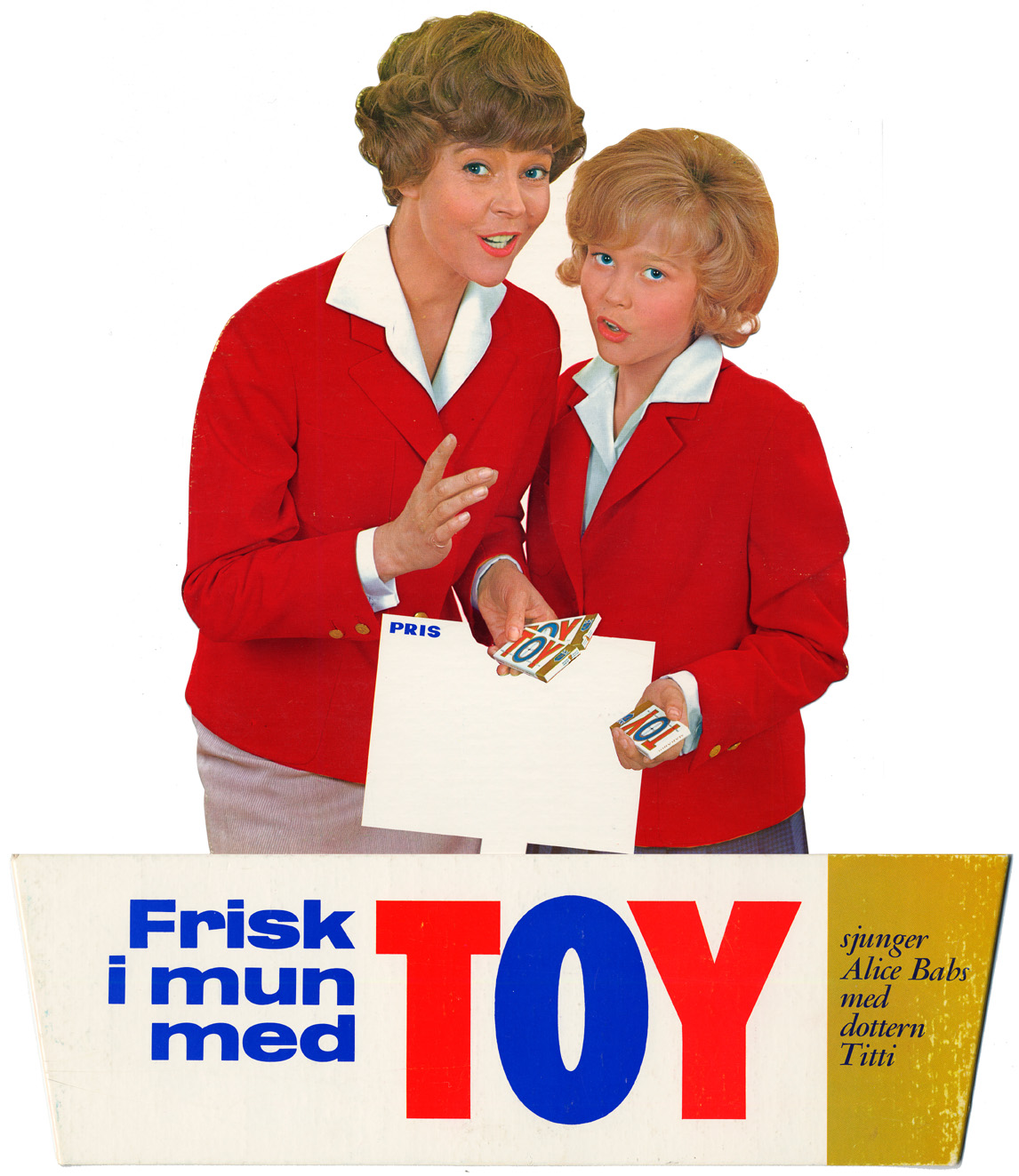
Alice Babs and daughter Titti Sjöblom in an advertisement for Toy chewing gum, 1960

Between 1973 and 2004, Babs and her husband resided in Costa del Sol, Spain, while still working in Sweden and internationally. In their later years, they returned to Sweden.

== Awards ==
She was awarded the Illis quorum by the government of Sweden in 2003.

== Death ==
Babs died of complications from Alzheimer's disease at age 90 on 11 February 2014 in Stockholm.

== Filmography ==
Year	Title	Role	Notes
1938	Thunder and Lightning	Flower Girl	Uncredited
1940	Swing it, magistern!	Inga Danell	
1941	Magistrarna på sommarlov		
1941	Sjung och le		Short
1942	Vårat gäng	Alice, Bergendals dotter	
1942	En trallande jänta	Inger 'Babs' Jansson	
1944	Eaglets	Marianne Hedvall	
1945	Skådetennis		Short
1946	Det glada kalaset	Anita	
1947	Song of Stockholm	Britt	
1952	Drömsemestern	Herself	
1952	H.C. Andersens sagor	Storyteller	
1953	Kungen av Dalarna	Herself	
1953	I dur och skur	Greta Norman	
1953	Resan till dej	Gun Karlsson	
1955	Swedish Girl	Karin Pettersson	
1956	Symphonie in Gold	Singer	
1956	Swing it, fröken	Alice Lind	
1958	Musik ombord	Ulla Wickström / Ulla Winther	
1959	Swinging at the Castle	Inga 'Trollet' Larsson	(final film role)
2008	Alice Babs – Swing´it		(orig. Naturröstens hemlighet, Documentary
2013	Alice Babs förlorade rättigheter		(Alice Babs' Lost Rights, Documentary

== Discography ==
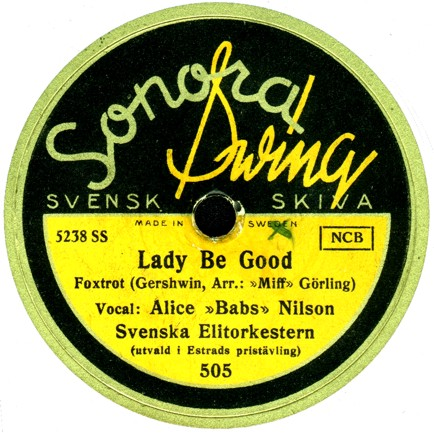
Recording of Alice Babs produced by the Swedish record label Sonora

Alice Babs' discography includes more than 800 recordings since her debut with Joddlarflickan in 1939. The following is a list of her recordings available on CD, listed chronologically from when they were originally recorded.

- Vax Records CD 1003 Alice Babs & Nisse Linds Hot-trio, originally recorded: 1939–41
- Naxos 8.120759 Swingflickan, originally recorded: 1939–44
- Vax Records CD 1000 Early recordings 1939–1949
- Klara skivan KLA 7802-2 Joddlarflickan (2 CDs), originally recorded: 1939–51
- Phontastic PHONTCD 9302 Swing it! Alice Babs!, originally recorded: 1939–53
- Sonora 548493-2 Swing it, Alice! (2 CDs), originally recorded: 1939–63
- Sonora 529315-2 Ett glatt humör, originally recorded: 1940–42
- Odeon 7C138-35971/2 Alice Babs, originally recorded: 1942–1947
- Metronome 8573-84676-2 Guldkorn, originally recorded: 1951–58
- Metronome 4509-93189-2 Metronomeåren, originally recorded: 1951–58
- Metronome 5050467-1616-2-7 Alice Babs bästa (2 CDs), originally recorded: 1951–61
- Bear Family BCD 15809-AH Mitsommernacht, originally recorded: 1953–59
- Bear Family BCD 15814-AH Lollipop, originally recorded: 1953–59
- EMI 7243-5-96148-2-3 Diamanter (2 CDs), originally recorded: 1958–60
- EMI 7243-5-20153-2-0 Just you, just me, originally recorded: 1958–72
- Pickwick 751146 Regntunga skyar, originally recorded: 1958–72
- Metronome 4509-95438-2 Swe-Danes Scandinavian Shuffle, originally recorded: 1959
- RCA 74321-12719-2 Alice and Wonderband, originally recorded: 1959
- Real Gone Music RGM-0496 Serenade to Sweden, Alice Babs and Duke Ellington, originally recorded: 1963
- Swedish Society Discofil SWECD 401 Sjung med oss mamma (Alice Tegnér), originally recorded: 1963
- Swedish Society Discofil SWECD 400 Alice Babs, originally recorded: 1964
- Swedish Society Discofil SWECD 402 Scandinavian songs (Svend Asmussen) originally recorded: 1964
- Prophone PCD 050 Yesterday, originally recorded: 1966–75
- Vax Records VAXCD 1006 "Illusion" (with Jan Johansson and Georg Riedels orchestra) Originally recorded 1966
- Vax Records CD 1008 "As time goes by" Alice Babs with Bengt Hallbergs trio and Arne Domnérus Big Band with Svend Asmussen. Originally recorded 1960–1969
- EMI 7243 5398942 2 Den olydiga ballongen/Hej du måne, originally recorded: 1968–76
- Prophone PCD 045 What a joy!, originally recorded: 1972–80
- Bluebell ABCD 052 There's something about me, originally recorded: 1973–78
- Prophone PCD 021 Serenading Duke Ellington, originally recorded: 1974–75
- Swedish Society Discofil SCD 3003 Om sommaren sköna – Sjunger Alice Tegnér, originally recorded: 1974
- Bluebell ABCD 005 Far away star, originally recorded: 1977
- RCA Victor 74321-62363-2 Swingtime again, originally recorded: 1998
- Sony SK 61797 A church blues for Alice, originally recorded: 1999
- Four Leaf Clover Records FLCDVD 8001 Swingtime Again with Charlie Norman recorded 1999
- Prophone PCD 062 Don't be blue, originally recorded: 2001
- Vax Records Vi Minns Alice Babs released: 2014

== Sources ==
- Cook, Richard (2005). Richard Cook's Jazz Encyclopedia. London: Penguin Books. p. 27. ISBN 0-141-00646-3.

Awards and achievements
Preceded by Debut entry	Sweden in the Eurovision Song Contest; 1958	Succeeded by Brita Borg with "Augustin"
