= Thore Ehrling =

Swedish jazz trumpeter (1912–1994)

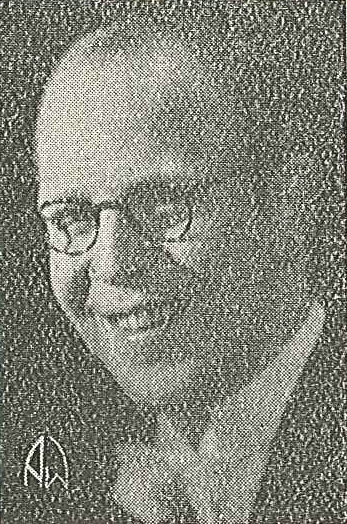
Thore Ehrling

Thore Ehrling (29 December 1912 - 21 October 1994) was a Swedish trumpeter, composer, and bandleader, who led jazz and popular music ensembles.

Born in Stockholm, Ehrling played with Frank Vernon's ensemble from 1930 to 1934, and concomitantly studied at the Royal Swedish Academy of Music. From 1935 to 1938 he played under Håkan von Eichwald and did arrangement and composition work on the side. He founded his own ensemble in 1938, which grew to big band size in the nineteen years it was active. This group played popular music and jazz, recorded frequently, and played often on Swedish radio. The group featured many sidemen who went on to become prominent on the Swedish jazz scene, such as Uffe Baadh and Carl-Henrik Norin, and accompanied popular Swedish singers such as Inger Berggren and Lily Berglund.

Ehrling died in Stockholm in 1994.
