= 2016 Icelandic presidential election =

- 25 June 2016
- Turnout: 75.70%
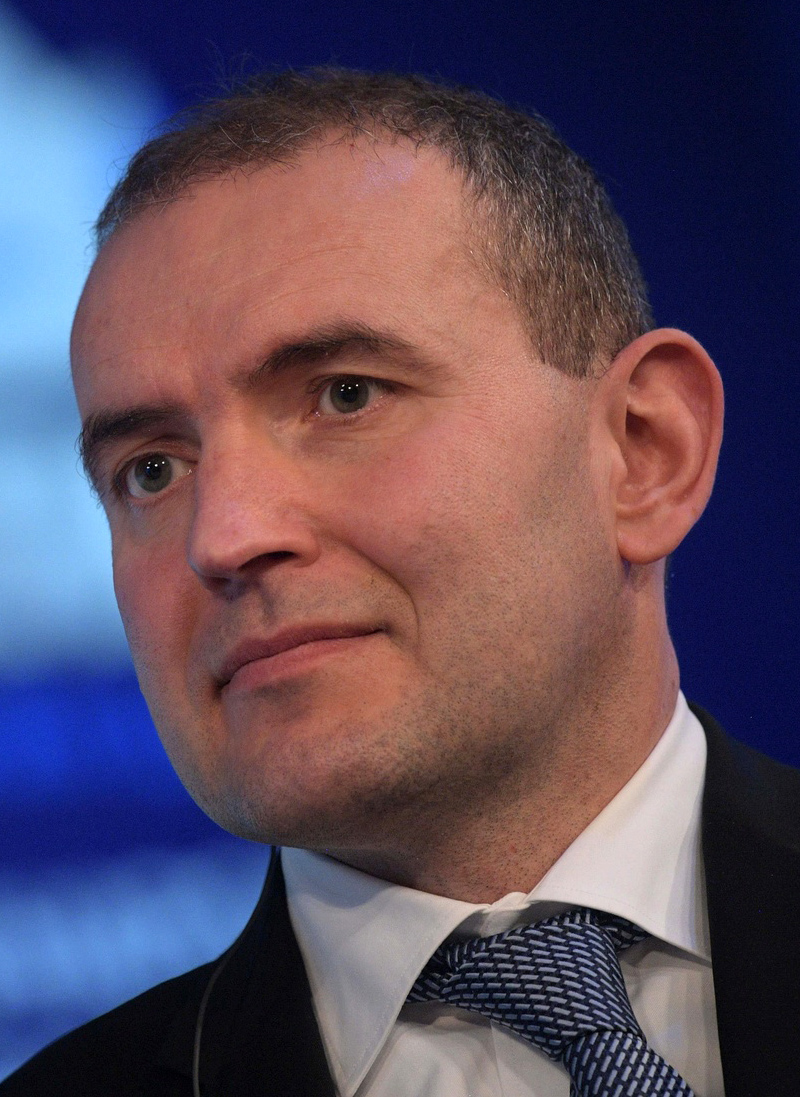

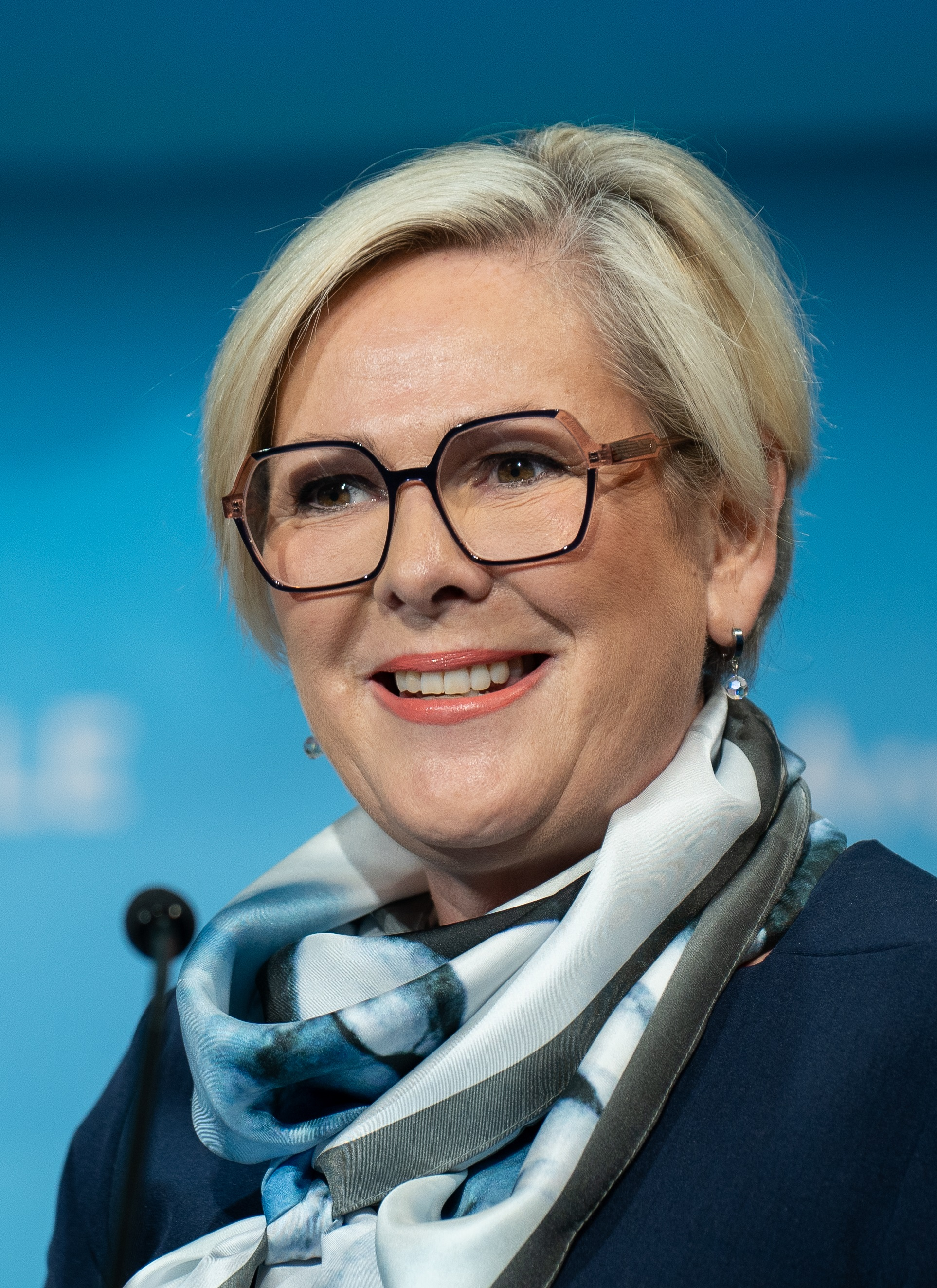

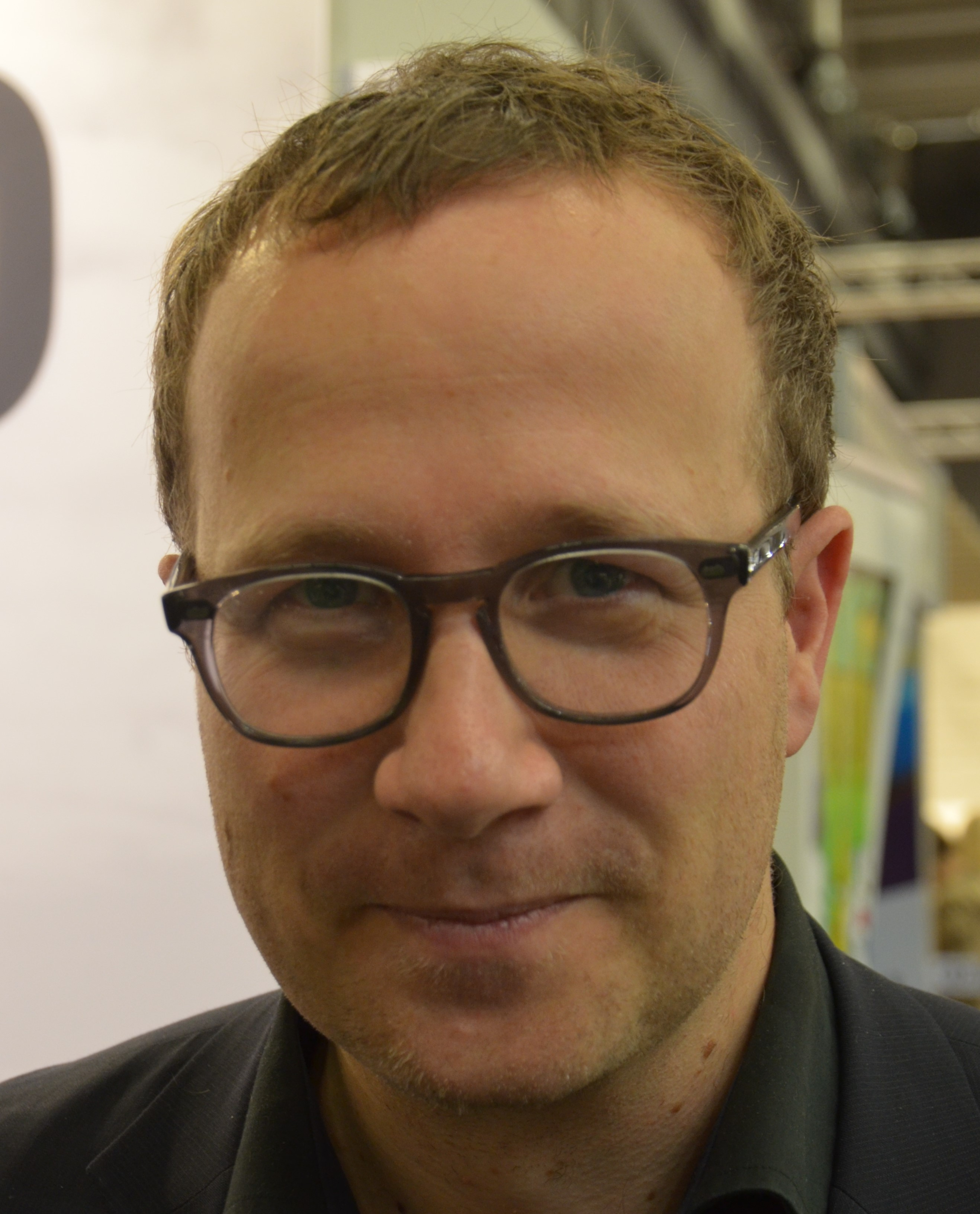

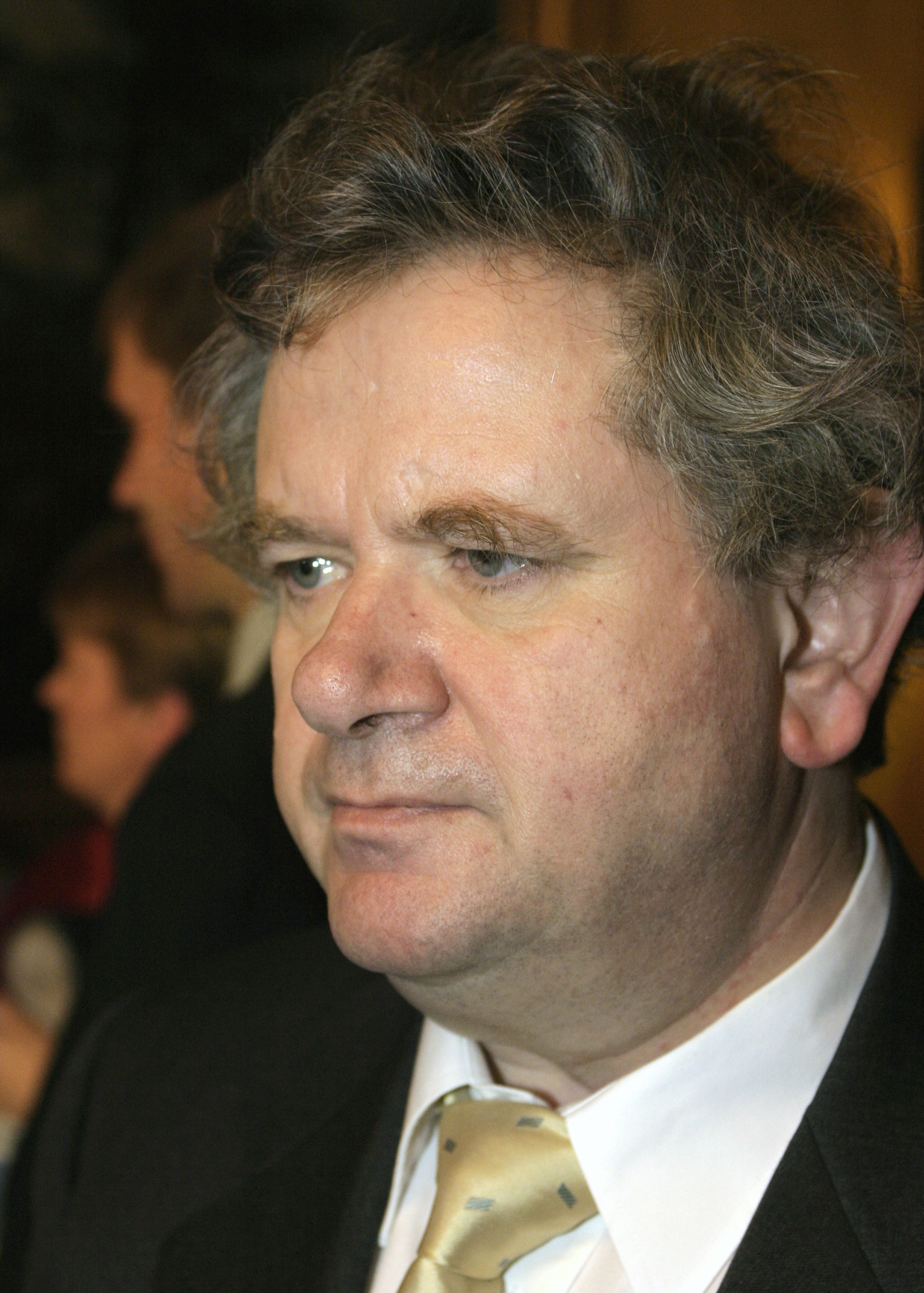
Candidate	Guðni Th. Jóhannesson	Halla Tómasdóttir
Popular vote	71,356	50,995
Percentage	39.08%	27.93%
Candidate	Andri Snær Magnason	Davíð Oddsson
Popular vote	26,037	25,108
Percentage	14.26%	13.75%
President before election
Ólafur Ragnar Grímsson
Elected President
Guðni Th. Jóhannesson

Presidential elections were held in Iceland on 25 June 2016. President Ólafur Ragnar Grímsson, elected in 1996, stepped down after serving five consecutive terms. The history professor Guðni Th. Jóhannesson was elected after receiving a plurality of 39.1% of the vote. He took office on 1 August, as the first new president of Iceland in twenty years.

== Electoral system ==
The President of Iceland is elected by plurality in a single round of voting. Candidates must be Icelandic citizens and at least 35 years of age on election day.

== Campaign ==
On 1 January 2016 incumbent president Ólafur Ragnar Grímsson announced that he would not seek a sixth term in the office, wanting "to transfer the responsibilities of the president onto other shoulders". He later retracted and decided to run in April, citing political unrest after the fallout of the Panama Papers leak, which implicated Prime Minister Sigmundur Davíð Gunnlaugsson and forced him to resign after large anti-government protests. In the following ten days five other candidates suspended their campaigns, one of them after endorsing Ólafur Ragnar. Former Prime Minister Davíð Oddsson declared his candidacy on 8 May, and Ólafur Ragnar withdrew from the race the following day, stating that there was now a supply of qualified candidates. A poll showing Ólafur Ragnar with only 25% support had been published the same day.

Davíð Oddsson attacked Guðni Th. Jóhannesson in two TV-debates for allegedly having an unpatriotic view of the Cod Wars. Guðni, a historian of the Cod Wars, dismissed these charges and explained that his take on the Cod Wars was nuanced and supported by research. Davíð has also said that Guðni supported Icelandic responsibility for Icesave and is in favor of EU membership. Guðni responded, saying that his words were taken out context in both instances, and that he as President would make sure that the public would have a say in a referendum both on the resumption of EU accession negotiations and approval of any accession treaty. Furthermore, Davíð has alleged that Guðni will "undermine the Constitution" by supporting constitutional change. Halla is personally against EU membership and Andri Snær is undecided.

=== End-of-campaign developments ===
Despite an initial anti-establishment feeling, interest in the campaign waned in the last days due to the performance of the Iceland national football team in the Euro 2016. Like his predecessor, Guðni is opposed to membership of the European Union. In the final debate the day before the vote, he said the result of the Brexit vote changes "much for the better for us Icelanders", implying that the European Economic Area agreement that non-EU members Norway and Iceland have with the EU could play a more important role with the United Kingdom on board. His campaign promises included vowing to "modernise political life" and give voters a chance of direct democracy initiatives.

== Candidates ==
Candidates had to formally declare their intention to run on or before 20 May (five weeks prior to the election) and "be proposed by not less than 1500 voters". The number of candidates in previous elections had been six at most, but the announced departure of the incumbent president prompted an unprecedented number of people to consider running. A total of 21 people publicly declared their intention to run, and around ten more were reported to be seriously considering it. Finally, nine candidates fulfilled the requirements for ballot access.

=== Elected President ===
- Guðni Th. Jóhannesson – senior lecturer in history at the University of Iceland and author. He was elected president in the election and served as president from August 1 2016 until August 1 2024.

=== Main candidates ===
- Andri Snær Magnason – author and environmentalist.
- Davíð Oddsson – editor-in-chief of Morgunblaðið and former Prime Minister for the Independence Party.
- Halla Tómasdóttir – entrepreneur and investor, co-founder of Audur Capital. She was later elected president in 2024 presidential election and is incumbent president of Iceland.
- Sturla Jónsson – truck driver, protester, former parliamentary candidate and chairman of the Sturla Jónsson party.

=== Other candidates ===
- Ástþór Magnússon – businessman and peace activist; perennial candidate, who had previously run for president three times, in 1996, 2004, and 2012. Ran for president one more time in 2024.
- Elísabet Jökulsdóttir – author and freelance journalist.
- Guðrún Margrét Pálsdóttir – nurse and founder of ABC Barnahjálp, an aid organization focusing on children in Asia and Africa.
- Hildur Þórðardóttir – ethnologist, author, independent publisher and healer.

=== Failed to get ballot access ===
Two candidates failed to collect enough signatures before the deadline expired.

- Baldur Ágústsson – businessman, who also ran in 2004. Did not submit before the deadline.
- Magnús Ingberg Jónsson – fish processing engineer and entrepreneur. Made an incomplete submission and was rejected by electoral authorities.

=== Suspended campaign ===
- Ari Jósepsson – entertainer and self-proclaimed "YouTube star". Declared in January and withdrew on 13 May due to lack of media coverage of minor candidates.
- Benedikt Kristján Mewes – German-born dairy engineer and mailman, who wants to be the first gay president. Failed to collect enough signatures and withdrew on the last day to hand them in.
- Bæring Ólafsson – former COO of Coca-Cola Bottlers Philippines. Declared in March and withdrew in late April. Endorsed Andri Snær Magnason.
- Guðmundur Franklín Jónsson – businessman and former chairman of the Right-Greens. Announced in March and left in April. Endorsed Ólafur Ragnar Grímsson. Ran for president in 2020.
- Heimir Örn Hólmarsson – electrical engineer and project manager. Announced in March and withdrew on 19 April due to the incumbent seeking reelection.
- Hrannar Pétursson – sociologist and former Human Resource- and Marketing Director for Icelandic Vodafone. Withdrew in April.
- Magnus Ingi Magnússon – restaurateur and caterer. Declared in April, withdrew on 17 May due to lack of signatures, saying he considered running for the Althingi instead.
- Ólafur Ragnar Grímsson – Incumbent President. In January, he declared that he would not seek reelection, but decided to enter the race on 18 April after political unrest in connection with the Panama Papers leak. He subsequently withdrew on 9 May stating as his reason that other qualified candidates had now entered the race.
- Vigfús Bjarni Albertsson – hospital chaplain. Announced his candidacy in March but withdrew on 18 April.
- Þorgrímur Þráinsson – author, motivational speaker, and former football player; announced he intended to run in November 2015, which he confirmed on 1 January. In April however, he said he would not go forth and implied he had not made a declaration.

=== Declined ===
- Baldur Thorhallsson – Professor of Political Science at the University of Iceland. Ran for president in 2024.
- Jón Gnarr – comedian and former Mayor of Reykjavík Ran for president in 2024.
- Katrín Jakobsdóttir – leader of the Left-Green Movement Ran for president in 2024.

=== Statement of intent ===
- Snorri Ásmundsson – a conceptual artist, released a statement in which he claimed he intended to run for president of both Iceland and Mexico, joining the presidential offices of the two countries.

== Opinion polls ==
Poll	Date	Olafur Ragnar Grímsson	Guðni Th. Jóhannesson	Andri Snær Magnason	Halla Tómasdóttir	Davið Oddsson	Others
MMR	22–26 April	52.6	–	29.4	8.8	–	9.2
Fréttablaðið	2–3 May	45	38	11	3	–	3
MMR	6–9 May	25.3	59.2	8.8	1.7	3.1^{[†]}	1.9
Fréttablaðið	10 May	3.2	69.0	10.7	1.0	13.7	2.4
Maskína	10–13 May	–	67.2	12.1	2.9	14.8	3.0
Félagsvísindastofnun HÍ	14 May	–	67.1	7.8	1.5	17.4	6.2
MMR	12–20 May	–	65.6	11.0	2.2	18.1	3.0
Gallup	19–25 May	–	57.2	10.9	5.4	22.0	4.6
Gallup	26 May – 3 June	–	56.7	10.6	7.5	20.3	5.3
Gallup	8–15 June	–	50.9	15.5	12.5	16.4	4.8
Félagsvísindastofnun HÍ	19–22 June	–	45.9	15.7	16.3	16.0	6.1
Gallup	20–24 June	–	44.6	16.0	18.6	16.0	4.8

^{†} based on 27% of the poll.

== Results ==
Guðni won the election with 39.1% of the votes. Halla received 27.9%, Andri Snær 14.3%, Davíð 13.7% and Sturla 3.5%. The turnout was 75.7%.

After voting on his birthday, Guðni said that he was satisfied he had "managed to present to the people my vision of the presidency." He said that should he win, he would first "go to France on Monday and see Iceland play England."

Candidate	Votes	%
Guðni Th. Jóhannesson	71,356	39.08
Halla Tómasdóttir	50,995	27.93
Andri Snær Magnason	26,037	14.26
Davíð Oddsson	25,108	13.75
Sturla Jónsson	6,446	3.53
Elísabet Jökulsdóttir	1,280	0.70
Ástþór Magnússon	615	0.34
Guðrún Margrét Pálsdóttir	477	0.26
Hildur Þórðardóttir	294	0.16
Total	182,608	100.00
Valid votes	182,608	98.50
Invalid/blank votes	2,782	1.50
Total votes	185,390	100.00
Registered voters/turnout	244,896	75.70
Source: Statistics Iceland
