= 2008 Icelandic presidential election =

Presidential election in Iceland

- 28 June 2008
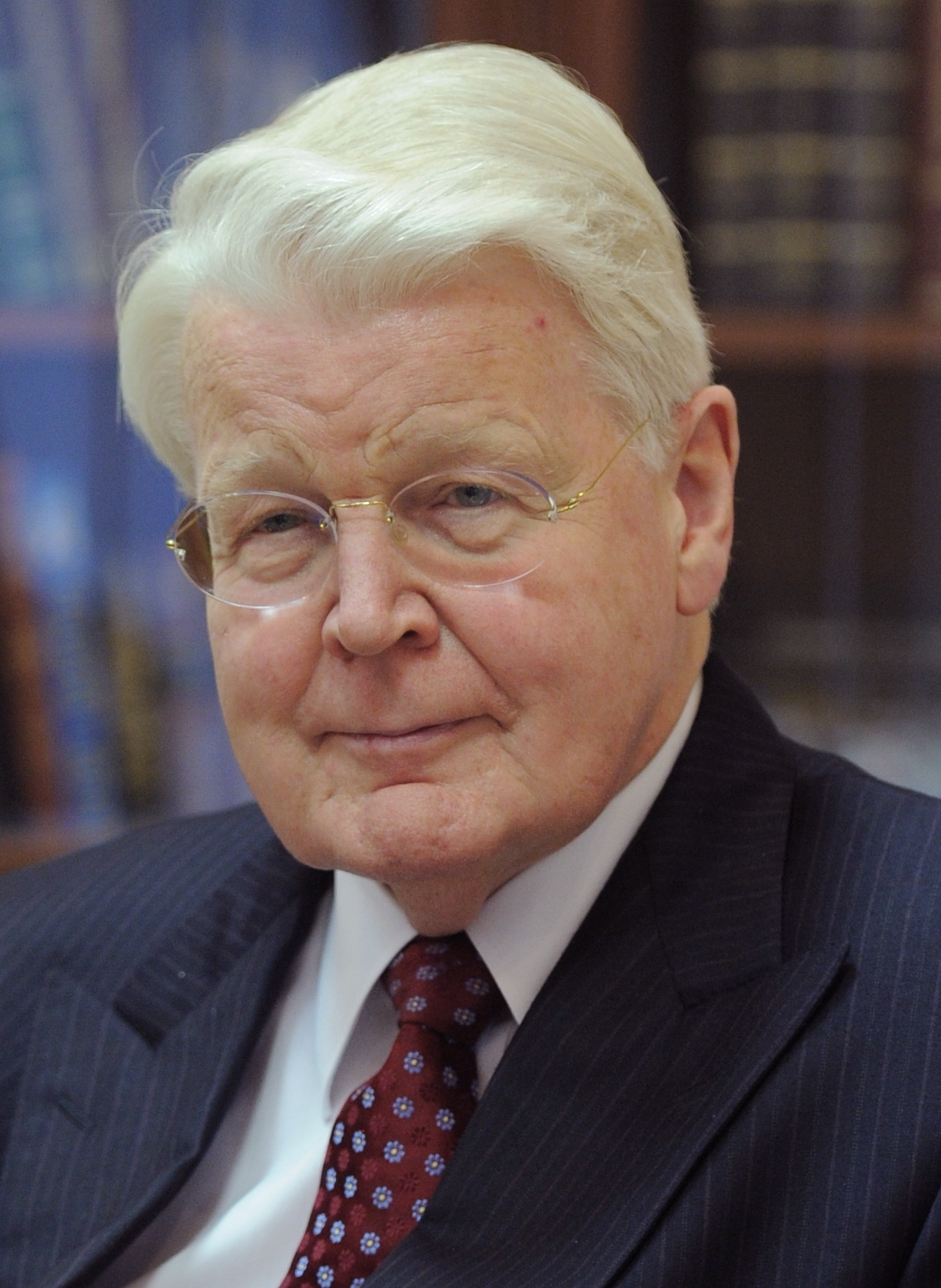
Candidate	Ólafur Ragnar Grímsson
Popular vote	Unopposed
President before election
Ólafur Ragnar Grímsson
Elected President
Ólafur Ragnar Grímsson

Presidential elections were planned to be held in Iceland on 28 June 2008.

The incumbent president Ólafur Ragnar Grímsson, first elected in 1996, stated in his New Year's speech that he would contest the election for a fourth term.

Ástþór Magnússon, who ran unsuccessfully in 1996 and 2004, ruled out running for the presidency.

No challenger to the incumbent president filed by the deadline to declare a candidacy on 24 May 2008, and so Ólafur Ragnar's fourth term was won uncontested.

Ólafur Ragnar was sworn in on 1 August 2008.
