= Ástþór Magnússon Wium =

Icelandic businessman and peace activist (born 1953)

- Born: 4 August 1953 (age 73); Reykjavík, Iceland
- Education: Commercial College of Iceland; Medway College of Art and Design
- Occupations: Businessman, peace activist
- Political party: Independent
- Other political affiliations: Democracy Movement (1998–2009)
- Spouse: Natalia Wium

Ástþór Magnússon Wium (born 4 August 1953) is an Icelandic businessman and peace activist, who is best known for being the founder of the first credit card company in Iceland and as a perennial candidate for the office of President of Iceland.

== Background and education ==
After finishing the landspróf (national examination), Ástþór studied at the Commercial College of Iceland before moving to the United Kingdom in order to study commercial photography and marketing at the Medway College of Art and Design.

== Business career ==
Ástþór brought Eurocard to Iceland in 1979, making it the first credit card company operating in Iceland. The success of Eurocard made him financially independent.

== Political career ==
Ástþór unsuccessfully campaigned for the post of President of Iceland five times: in 1996, 2004, 2012, 2016, and 2024. In 2000, he failed to get the necessary 1,500 signatures and therefore was not on the ballot. On 1 June 2012, his candidacy was revoked because he had failed to obtain the mandatory certificate from the senior electoral officer in the Northwest constituency; as he was the only challenger in 2000, this meant that the sitting President Ólafur Ragnar Grímsson was re-elected unopposed. In the 2004 election, he got 1.9% of the total vote, and in 2016 he got 0.3%.

Ástþór was the founder and chairperson of the Democracy Movement, a political party founded in 1998 for the purpose of promoting direct democracy and e-democracy. The party folded after the 2009 general elections. He also founded the peace movement Peace2000.

In 1996, he distributed the book The Use of Bessastaðir to every household in Iceland.

Ástþór has at various points been critical of the foreign policy of the United States, particularly during the Iraq War, which he vehemently opposed. In later years, Ástþór has frequently taken a pro-Russia stance in various disputes between Russia and the Western world. Notably, he expressed support for Russia's annexation of Crimea in 2014 and suggested that Russian President Vladimir Putin should have been awarded the Nobel Peace Prize for arranging it. Ástþór has been critical of international sanctions placed on Russia in wake of the invasion of Ukraine, and in 2023 he argued that the sanctions constituted an act of genocide against Russian people.

On 3 January 2024, Ástþór announced that he would run for President for the sixth time. During the review by the National Electoral Commission, after turning in the required endorsements, it was found that Ástþór, along with a few other candidates, had less than the minimum number of signatures when invalid endorsements had been removed, such as the names of those who had also signed with another candidate. The following day he turned the missing endorsements and his candidacy was ruled valid.

== Personal life ==
Ástþór is married to the Russian-born lawyer Natalia Wium.
