= 2016 Icelandic anti-government protests =

Political protests in Iceland

- Date: 4 April 2016 – 20 April 2016
- Location: Austurvöllur, Reykjavík
- Caused by: Revelations about the tax affairs of the Prime Minister, the finance minister and the interior minister.
- Goals: Resignation of the government; New parliamentary elections
- Methods: Protests
- Result: Prime Minister Sigmundur Davíð resigns; A new government is appointed with Sigurður Ingi Jóhannsson as Prime Minister

Parties
Left-Green Movement; Pirate Party; Bright Future	Progressive Party; Independence Party

Lead figures
No single leader	Sigmundur Davíð Gunnlaugsson; Bjarni Benediktsson; Sigurður Ingi Jóhannsson

Casualties
- Deaths: 0
- Injuries: 0
- Arrested: 3

The 2016 Icelandic anti-government protests were a series of protests against the Icelandic government following the release of the Panama Papers.

== Background ==
In 2007, Sigmundur Davíð Gunnlaugsson and his wife, Anna Sigurlaug Pálsdóttir, set up Wintris Inc via the law firm Mossack Fonseca. The company was registered in the British Virgin Islands, "a well-known offshore tax haven." In January 2009, Sigmundur Davíð was elected as the Chairman of the Progressive Party, and in the 2009 parliamentary election was elected as a member of the Althing. On the last day of 2009, Sigmundur Davíð sold his share in the company to his wife for $1, just before a new law came into force that would have forced him to declare his ownership as a conflict of interest. Wintris Inc lost millions of dollars due to the 2008 financial crisis.

Following the 2013 parliamentary election, the Progressive Party and the Independence Party, both of which had won 19 seats, formed a coalition government. Sigmundur Davíð Gunnlaugsson, as Chairman of the Progressive Party, became Prime Minister, and Bjarni Benediktsson, Chairman of the Independence Party, became Minister of Finance. As Prime Minister, Sigmundur Davíð pledged to fight demands from foreign creditors for full repayment by the Icelandic banks.

In March 2016, it was revealed that Anna Sigurlaug Pálsdóttir, the wife of the Prime Minister, Sigmundur Davíð Gunnlaugsson, was a creditor for Iceland's three failed banks, Landsbanki, Kaupthing Bank and Glitnir. Her company, Wintris Inc, was claiming a total of ISK 515 million from the three banks, due to losses incurred during the 2008–2011 Icelandic financial crisis. Following this revelation, a number of Icelandic MPs criticised the arrangement, with Svandís Svavarsdóttir, a former minister, calling for the government to resign and for new elections.

In the Panama Papers, released on 3 April 2016, not only Sigmundur Davíð, but also the finance minister, Bjarni Benediktsson, and the interior minister, Ólöf Nordal, were implicated in having offshore tax arrangements. The news was also broadcast in Iceland on a special edition of the current affairs program, Kastljós.

== Initial protests ==
In the wake of the Panama Papers revelations, on 3 April people began to use Facebook to organise a protest for the following day. According to Facebook, 10,000 people were planning to attend the protest.

At midday on 4 April, Sigmundur Davíð did a live television interview during which he said he would not be resigning, but did apologise for his performance in an earlier television interview. The protest was scheduled to take place at 5pm, and people slowly began gathering in Austurvöllur, the park just outside of Alþingishúsið, the building that houses the Althing. One early protester was arrested for throwing tubs of skyr at the building. When the protests began, members of the Althing were still sitting in a parliamentary session. The size of the crowd was estimated to be between 9,000 and 23,000 people by different sources, although was acknowledged to be one of the biggest political demonstrations in Iceland's history. The planned parliament session for the following day, 5 April, was cancelled.

On the morning of 5 April, Sigmundur Davíð announced via Facebook his intention to dissolve parliament and call early elections. Later on that morning, he met with the President of Iceland, Ólafur Ragnar Grímsson, who had just returned from a private visit to the United States. During the meeting, the Prime Minister asked the President to dissolve parliament and call new elections. Ólafur Ragnar refused this request, on the grounds that the Prime Minister had not consulted his coalition partner, the Independence Party, on this issue. The President also said that it was "inappropriate" to drag him into disputes between political parties.

In the afternoon on 5 April, a meeting of Progressive Party MPs concluded that Sigmundur Davíð should resign as Prime Minister. The meeting proposed Sigurður Ingi Jóhannsson, who was Minister of Fisheries and Agriculture, as his successor. The same day, another protest took place in Austurvöllur, with a smaller crowd than the day before. At 6:30pm, the protesters left Austurvöllur and began protesting outside the Progressive Party headquarters in Hverfisgata, a different part of Reykjavik. Protesters were calling for the government to resign and for new elections. That evening, foreign correspondents revealed a government press release saying that the Prime Minister "has not resigned" and was handing over the office to Sigurður Ingi "for an unspecified amount of time." This confusion of the matter was condemned by a number of opposition politicians, as well as Icelandic historian Guðni Th. Johannesson.

== New government ==
On 7 April, a new government was appointed, with Sigurður Ingi Jóhannsson as the Prime Minister. Gunnar Bragi Sveinsson, the former foreign affairs minister, replaced Sigurður Ingi as the agriculture and fisheries minister. Lilja Dögg Alfreðsdóttir, who is not a sitting MP, was brought in as the new foreign affairs minister, on the personal recommendation of former Prime Minister Sigmundur Davíð. The government announced early elections for autumn, saying that it was necessary for them to stay in power to complete the removal of capital controls. Protests taking place in Reykjavík coincided with the appointment of the new government, which took place at Bessastaðir.

On 8 April, the new government was in parliament for the first time. In the morning, ministers discussed their plans, strategies and ongoing projects. In the afternoon, the focus was on the opposition's motion of no confidence, and vote on a new election. At least three coalition MPs had expressed dismay at the government's actions before the votes were taken. The government survived the two votes put forward by the opposition parties, winning the no confidence 38-25, and the vote for new elections 37-26. Following the votes, Bjarni Benediktsson told reporters that it had been "a very tough week."

== Further protests ==
Protests resumed with increased further on 9 April, when some estimates put the number of protesters in attendance at 14,000.

== See also ==
- 2009 Icelandic financial crisis protests
