= 2012 Icelandic presidential election =

- 30 June 2012
- Turnout: 69.32%
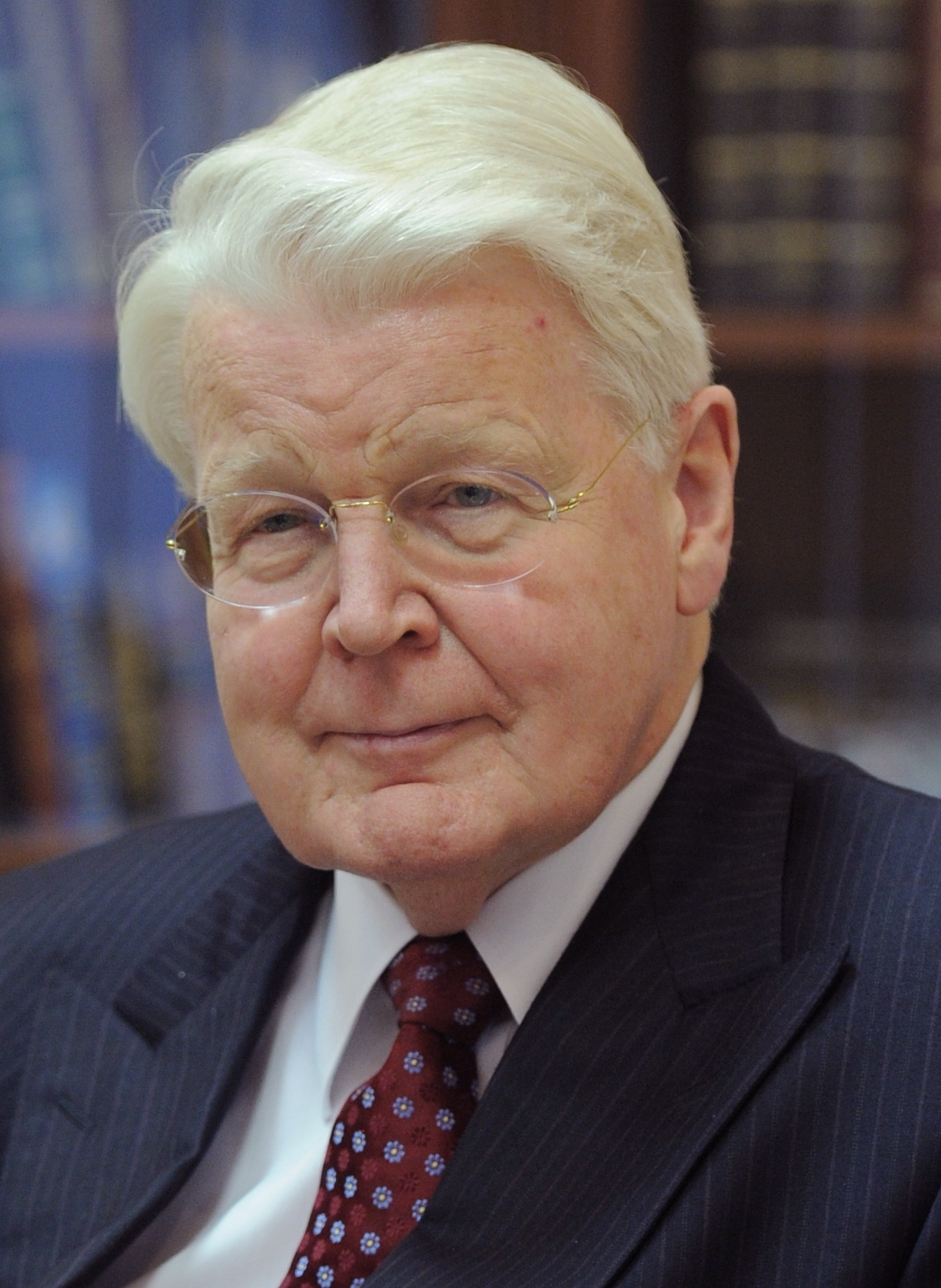

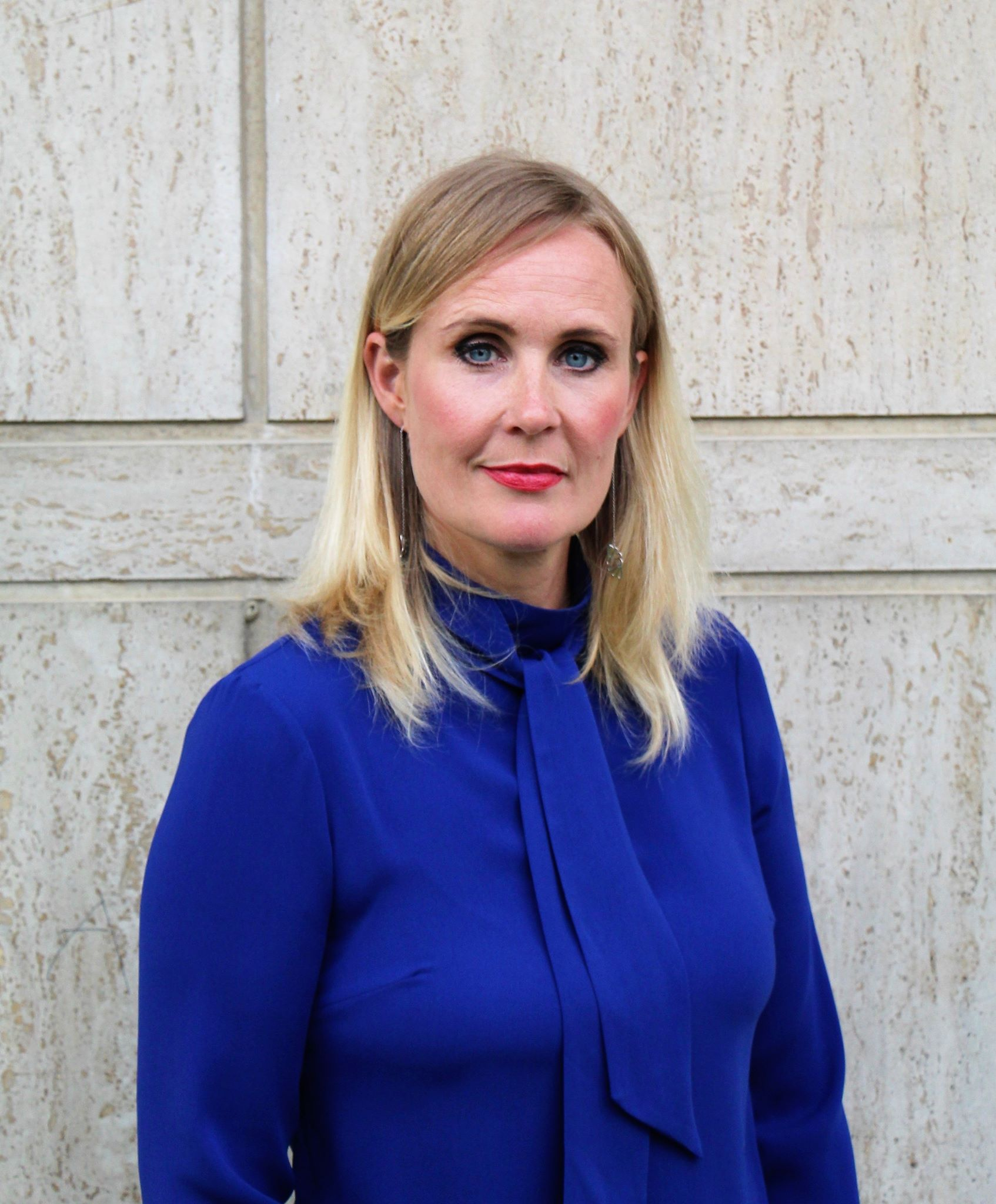

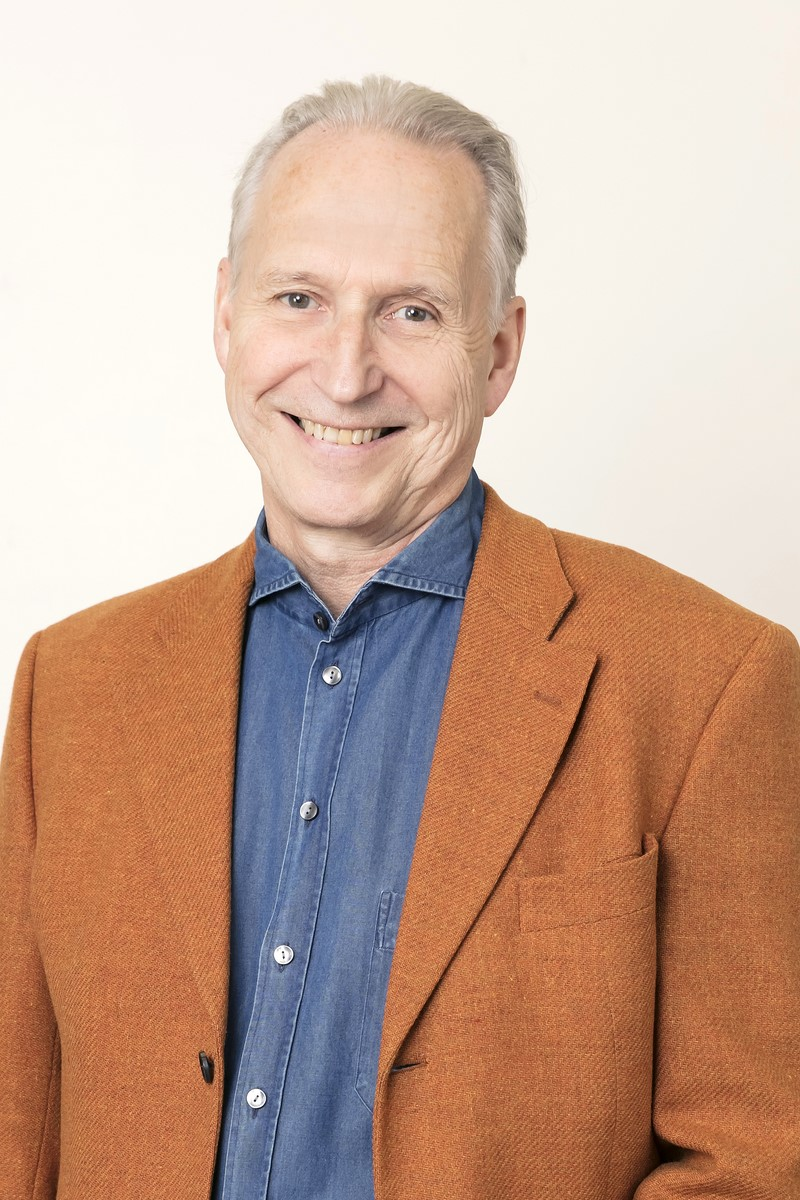
Candidate	Ólafur Ragnar Grímsson	Thóra Arnórsdóttir	Ari Trausti Guðmundsson
Popular vote	84,036	52,795	13,762
Percentage	52.78%	33.16%	8.64%
President before election
Ólafur Ragnar Grímsson
Elected President
Ólafur Ragnar Grímsson

Presidential elections were held in Iceland on 30 June 2012. The result was a victory for the incumbent Ólafur Ragnar Grímsson, who defeated his nearest rival Thóra Arnórsdóttir by nearly 20% of the vote, and went on to serve a record fifth term as president of Iceland.

== Electoral system ==
The President of Iceland is elected in one round by first-past-the-post voting.

== Candidates and campaign ==
There were six candidates, but the election became a contest between the incumbent president, and the journalist Thóra Arnórsdóttir, who wanted to return the presidency to a more ceremonial role.

Main candidates:

- The incumbent president, Ólafur Ragnar Grímsson, initially stated he would not seek re-election, but then stated on 4 March that he would run for a fifth term, after receiving a petition of over 30,000 voters in favour of his candidacy. Speaking in Selfoss, he said that "under normal circumstances I would have come to a different conclusion, but more than 30,000 Icelanders, which is a significant part of all the voters in Iceland, requested that I continue. Many significant matters that are likely to lead to conflict and confrontations are going to be on the agenda in the coming years."
- Thóra Arnórsdóttir, a journalist and news presenter. She announced her candidacy on 4 April and received the necessary 1,500 signatures in one weekend.

Others:

- Ari Trausti Guðmundsson, a writer, geophysicist and formerly of the Communist Party of Iceland, but now an independent.
- Dr. Herdís Thorgeirsdóttir, a lawyer and professor of constitutional law and human rights at Bifröst University, announced her candidacy on 30 March. She called a press meeting that day and said her campaign would be an experiment on democracy, whether it was possible to run without the backing of powerful financial actors and political parties. She referred to the financial collapse in 2008 and the Parliamentary investigative report which concluded that the main reason for the collapse were the close ties between politics and the corporate world seriously damaging the democratic process. Her candidacy was an attempt to increase accountability in the democratic process by not accepting funding from corporations as it is crucial in the struggle against prevailing corruption to limit the influence of money in elections. She is the President of the European Women Women Lawyers' Association and Iceland's representative at the Venice Commission of the Council of Europe.
- Andrea Jóhanna Ólafsdóttir, former chairwoman of Hagsmunasamtök heimilanna, a non-governmental organisation founded in the wake of the 2008–2012 Icelandic financial crisis. A vocal critic of both government and financial institutions, she announced her candidacy on 1 May. She supports the minimum wage of 193,000 krona.
- Hannes Bjarnason, a farmer who lived in Norway for 14 years. He seeks to enhance the place of "morality" in the public debate and to "safeguard" national interests.

Two other candidates declared their intent to stand in the election, but later dropped out:

- Jón Lárusson, a police inspector charged with investigating tax fraud since the economic crisis. He claims to be apolitical and has opposed membership of the EU.
- Ástþór Magnússon, previously a candidate in the 2004 election, a businessman and pacifist, who announced his candidacy on 3 March 2012.

== Campaign ==
After trailing in the opinion polls, Ólafur resorted to a negative campaign against Thóra, saying she would be "dangerous for the country" and that she would "do nothing but follow the government's will, particularly in terms of foreign policy", in continuing its membership application to the European Union being pursued by the current government led by Jóhanna Sigurðardóttir's Social Democratic Alliance, and he had reservations about the prospect of being a member of the EU. He also accused the Icelandic media of giving Thóra preferential treatment. Ólafur also claimed to be the best person to steer Iceland through financial crisis. Thóra also accused Ólafur of distorting the president's role from that of a figurehead to a more political position and that she would return the post to its ceremonial stature instead of getting involved in politics. However, Ólafur was said to be popular because of the two referendums Iceland held over the financial crisis and, as a result, many Icelanders felt he was looking out for their interests after being seen to have stood up to the United Kingdom and the Netherlands over Icesave repayments.

Thóra told the Reykjavik Grapevine that Iceland needs new leadership: "I think we have all felt a strong need for a change in this country. Iceland is a small country, and we pretty much agree on how this society should be;" she also told Morgunbladid that her lack of experience in politics was not a bad thing as she "think[s] that now is an opportunity to learn from the experience we have been through ... and use it for a new beginning...[although the presidency is largely ceremonial, the position] has a great power of influence."

== Opinion polls ==
An opinion poll published on 21 May by the Institute of Social Sciences at the University of Iceland showed Thóra leading with 46.2%, with Ólafur on 37.8%. However, after she suspended her campaign as she was due to give birth, the gap narrowed as Ólafur stood alone as the leading campaigner. An average of three poll prior to the election indicated Ólafur leading with 45% and Thóra in second place with 37.7% ahead of four other candidates.

Name	11 and 12 April	26 April	10 and 15 May	8–18 May	23 and 24 May	1–5 June	14–20 June	22–26 June	25–26 June
Andrea Ólafsdóttir	-	-	-	3.8 %	2.7 %	2.1 %	1.6 %	2.5 %	1.7 %
Ari Trausti Guðmundsson	-	11.5 %	8.9 %	8.9 %	5.3 %	9.2 %	10.5 %	9.3 %	7.5 %
Ástþór Magnússon	1.5 %	0.8 %	0.9 %	0.4 %	0.9 %	-	-	-	-
Hannes Bjarnason	0.4 %	0.3 %	0.6 %	0.2 %	0.0 %	1.1 %	0.8 %	0.8 %	0.3 %
Herdís Þorgeirsdóttir	2.9 %	3.0 %	1,3 %	2.6 %	1.3 %	2.6 %	5.3 %	3.4 %	2.6 %
Jón Lárusson	1.2 %	0.6 %	1.0 %	0.1 %	1.2 %	-	-	-	-
Ólafur Ragnar Grímsson	46.0 %	34.8 %	41.3 %	37.8 %	53.9 %	45.8 %	44.8 %	50.8 %	57.0 %
Thóra Arnórsdóttir	46.5 %	49.0 %	43.4 %	46.2 %	35.3 %	39.3 %	37.0 %	33.6 %	30.8 %

== Conduct ==
Voting centres were open from 9AM to 10PM. After having voted, Thóra said to DV: "You see this glorious day, I can't be anything but optimistic. The Gallup poll gives a strong indication of the outcome, but we will just count the votes and accept whatever that brings us. To have the possibility to topple the current president is a victory in itself." The same day Ólafur wrote in Morgunbladid: "Iceland is now at a crossroads. Behind us are difficult years. Ahead are decisions on the constitution and our relationship with other countries in Europe. There is still turbulence in the continent's economy and in many areas... The president...shall assist the country in tackling the biggest issues; they will determine the fate of Icelanders for decades."

== Results ==
Candidate	Votes	%
Ólafur Ragnar Grímsson	84,036	52.78
Thóra Arnórsdóttir	52,795	33.16
Ari Trausti Guðmundsson	13,762	8.64
Herdis Thorgeirsdottir	4,189	2.63
Andrea Ólafsdóttir	2,867	1.80
Hannes Bjarnason	1,556	0.98
Total	159,205	100.00
Valid votes	159,205	97.52
Invalid/blank votes	4,046	2.48
Total votes	163,251	100.00
Registered voters/turnout	235,495	69.32
Source: Nohlen & Stöver

=== Reactions ===
After partial results were released Thóra told RUV: "This has been a valuable experience. Now I will take a holiday, attend to my new daughter and the other children and go on maternity leave and think how I can put this experience to use. To get more than one-third [of votes], I'm overwhelmed. I of course hoped to win. This is something you only do once in a lifetime," as she indicated she would not run in the next election.

== Analysis ==
According to Euronews, Ólafur's win was seen as having "emboldened a presidential office that had up until then played a mainly ceremonial role".

If one of the female candidates had won, Iceland would have had nearly all its leading governing and religious positions held by women; the female president would be head of state, Jóhanna Sigurðardóttir would be head of government, Ásta Ragnheiður Jóhannesdóttir would be the Althing speaker, while Agnes M. Sigurðardóttir would have been the head of the Church of Iceland.
