= Hannibalsson =

Hannibalsson is an Icelandic patronymic surname, literally meaning "son of Hannibal". Notable people with the name include:

- Arnór Hannibalsson (1934–2012), Icelandic philosopher, historian, and translator and academic
- Jón Baldvin Hannibalsson (born 1939), Icelandic politician and diplomat
