= Guðrún Agnarsdóttir =

Icelandic politician and physician (born 1941)

Guðrún Agnarsdóttir (born 1941) is an Icelandic politician and physician. She served in the Alþingi from 1983 to 1990 as a member of the Women's List, and ran for the presidency of Iceland in 1996. She was CEO of Iceland's cancer society from 1992 to 2009, when she retired to spend time with her family and to continue farming forests.

== Early life and education ==
Guðrún Agnarsdóttir was born in Reykjavík to Agnar Guðmundsson and Birna Petersen on 2 June 1941.

In 1961 and 1968, she earned degrees from the University of Iceland. In university, only five percent of the students were women. For the next two years, she worked in hospitals, before receiving further education at Hammersmith Hospital and the Royal Postgraduate Medical School over the next eleven. She received her Icelandic medical license in 1978, and her British medical license in 1981.

== Career ==
She served in the Alþingi from 1983 to 1990; for the first four years, she was elected at the national level, and for the last three, she represented Reykjavík. She was a member of the Women's List. She worked on issues relating to rape, AIDS, and the medical sciences.

In the 1996 Icelandic presidential election, Guðrún was a candidate as a member of the Women's List. She said she ran to make Iceland "a model society ... where all individuals matter". She was the only woman to run, and lost to Ólafur Ragnar Grimsson with around 25 percent of the vote. She sent Ólafur congratulations, and he sent her thanks for her work during the campaign. The Women's List doubled in representation in the Alþingi, from three to six members.

Guðrún is a physician. She met her husband, Helgi Þröstur Valdimarsson, in her early career as a doctor. From 1988 to 1992, she was a member of the executive board of the cancer society of Iceland, and from 1992 to 2009, was its CEO; she retired to spend time with her grandchildren and continue forest farming.

== Later life ==
In 2018, her husband died. In 2021, Guðrún said that she no longer regretted losing the presidential election.
