= Baldur Ágústsson =

Icelandic businessman

Baldur Ágústsson is an Icelandic businessman, who ran for president of Iceland in 2004 and 2016.

Baldur started his career as a wireless operator on board a fishing boat, and later became an air traffic controller at Reykjavík Airport. Meanwhile, he set up Iceland's first security firm, Varði. In the early 2000s he lived in Britain where he was engaged in real estate business. He was the main challenger against incumbent Olafur Ragnar Grimsson in the 2004 Icelandic presidential election where he got 12.5% of the vote. It was only the second time a sitting president had been challenged and the first time a challenger got more than 6% of the vote.

His motivation for running was dissatisfaction with the President vetoing a media bill, which was the first use of a presidential veto in the history of Iceland.

I personally believe that Ólafur Ragnar should not have used it on a smallish issue such as media bill. It is a bit like a lifeboat. You don’t use it when you want to go on a trip, you use it when there is an emergency and this was not an emergency.

— Baldur Ágústsson

In May 2016 he announced his decision to run for president once more aiming to "restore respect for the presidency, to promote a better service to the sick, the elderly and the disabled, to promote friendship with foreign nations and operate the presidency within the framework of the budget."
