= Sigurður Ingi Jóhannsson =

Prime Minister of Iceland from 2016 to 2017

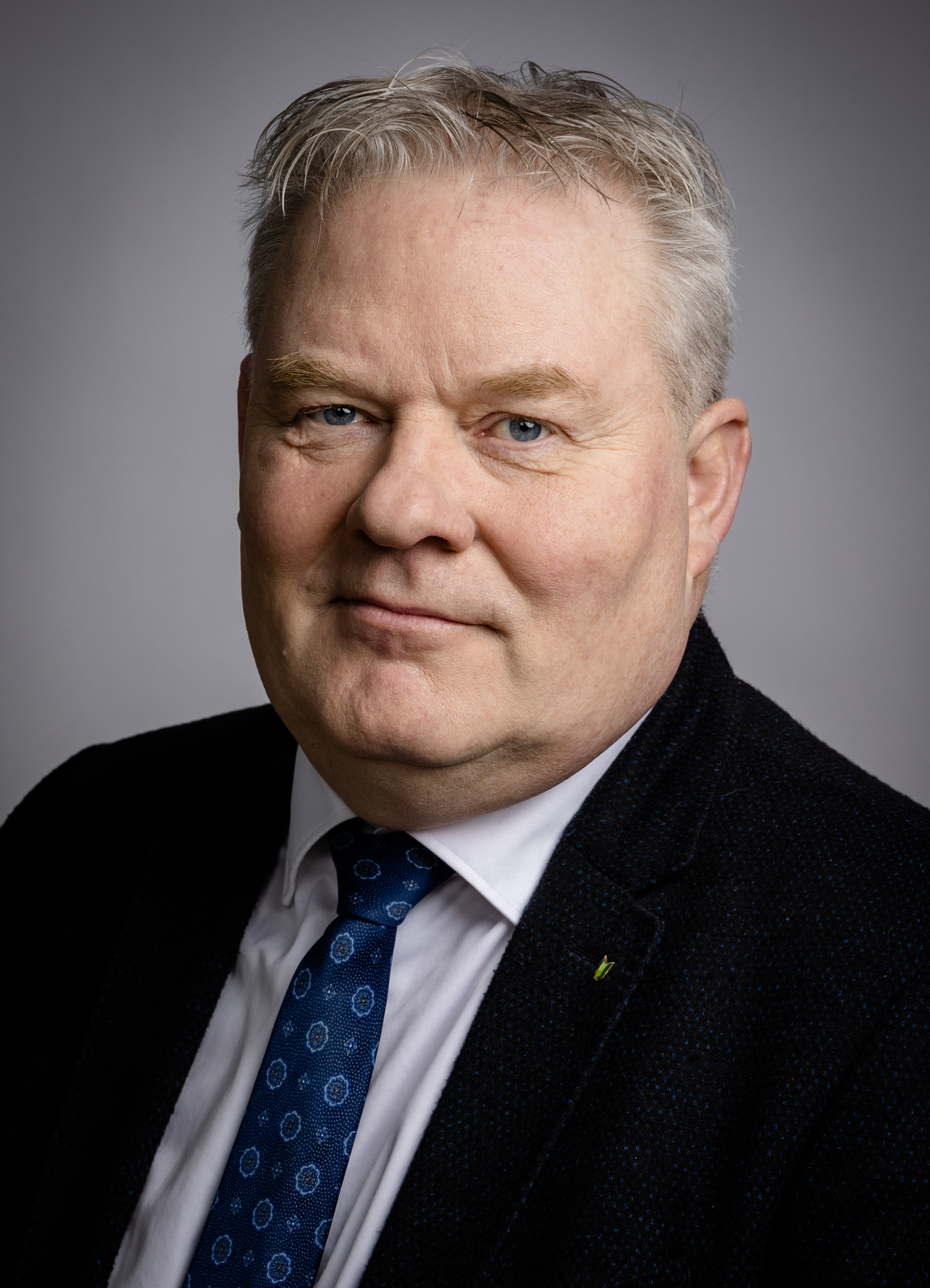
- Official portrait, 2021

Minister for Finance and Economic Affairs
- In office 9 April 2024 – 21 December 2024
- Prime Minister: Bjarni Benediktsson
- Preceded by: Þórdís Kolbrún R. Gylfadóttir
- Succeeded by: Daði Már Kristófersson

Minister of Infrastructure
- In office 17 October 2024 – 21 December 2024
- Prime Minister: Bjarni Benediktsson
- Preceded by: Svandís Svavarsdóttir
- Succeeded by: Eyjólfur Ármannsson (Transport and Local Government)
- In office 28 November 2021 – 9 April 2024
- Prime Minister: Katrín Jakobsdóttir
- Preceded by: himself (Transport and Local Government)
- Succeeded by: Svandís Svavarsdóttir

Minister of Transport and Local Government
- In office 30 November 2017 – 28 November 2021
- Prime Minister: Katrín Jakobsdóttir
- Preceded by: Jón Gunnarsson
- Succeeded by: himself (Infrastructure)

Chairman of the Progressive Party
- In office 2 October 2016 – 15 February 2026
- Deputy: Lilja Dögg Alfreðsdóttir
- Preceded by: Sigmundur Davíð Gunnlaugsson
- Succeeded by: Lilja Dögg Alfreðsdóttir

Prime Minister of Iceland
- In office 7 April 2016 – 11 January 2017
- President: Ólafur Ragnar Grímsson; Guðni Th. Jóhannesson
- Preceded by: Sigmundur Davíð Gunnlaugsson
- Succeeded by: Bjarni Benediktsson

Minister of Fisheries and Agriculture
- In office 23 May 2013 – 7 April 2016
- Prime Minister: Sigmundur Davíð Gunnlaugsson
- Preceded by: Steingrímur J. Sigfússon
- Succeeded by: Gunnar Bragi Sveinsson

Minister of the Environment and Natural Resources
- In office 23 May 2013 – 31 December 2014
- Prime Minister: Sigmundur Davíð Gunnlaugsson
- Preceded by: Svandís Svavarsdóttir
- Succeeded by: Sigrún Magnúsdóttir

Member of the Althing
- Incumbent
- Assumed office 25 April 2009
- Constituency: South

Personal details
- Born: 20 April 1962 (age 64) Selfoss, Iceland
- Party: Progressive
- Spouse: Ingibjörg Elsa Ingjaldsdóttir
- Children: 5

Sigurður Ingi Jóhannsson (pronounced [ˈsɪːɣʏrðʏr ˈiŋcɪ ˈjouːhansɔn]; born 20 April 1962) is an Icelandic politician, who was the prime minister of Iceland from April 2016 to January 2017. He was the chairman of the Progressive Party from 2016 to 2026 and Minister of Finance and Economic Affairs from April to December 2024, having previously served as Minister of Infrastructure.

Sigurður Ingi was appointed as the prime minister on 7 April 2016, following the resignation of Sigmundur Davíð Gunnlaugsson in the wake of revelations contained in the Panama Papers. He was elected as chairman of the Progressive Party on 2 October that year, narrowly ahead of the incumbent chairman Sigmundur Davíð.

On 30 October 2016, due to the results of the parliamentary election held the previous day on 29 October 2016, Sigurður announced his pending resignation as Prime Minister. He officially left office on 11 January 2017 and was succeeded by Bjarni Benediktsson.

== Biography ==
Sigurður grew up on a farm in Southern Iceland, trained as a veterinarian at the Royal Veterinary and Agricultural University in Copenhagen and opened a veterinarian practice specializing in farm animals after returning home to Iceland. He was since elected as chairman of the Veterinarian Association of Iceland and also ran the family farm for a number of years.

Sigurður served as Minister of Fisheries and Agriculture 2013–2016. He is a former Minister for the Environment and Natural Resources, a role which he held jointly with Fisheries and Agriculture until Sigrún Magnúsdóttir was appointed Minister for the Environment and Natural Resources at the end of 2014.

As a result of the ousting of prime minister Sigmundur Davíð Gunnlaugsson following the Panama Papers scandal, the Progressive Party announced Sigurður Ingi as the interim prime minister pending the early election in the autumn of 2016. He was succeeded by Bjarni Benediktsson.

He was Minister of Transport and Local Government, later renamed to Ministry of Infrastructure from 30 November 2017 to 9 April 2024. He became Minister of Finance and Economic Affairs on 9 April 2024, after Bjarni Benediktsson became prime minister again. Following the withdrawal of the Left-Green Movement from government in October the same year and the government's collapse, he was additionally reappointed as minister of infrastructure.

In April 2022, he faced a mild controversy when he was accused for racism towards black people, with him apologising and refusing the allegations.

Party political offices
Preceded by Sigmundur Davíð Gunnlaugsson	Leader of the Progressive Party; 2016–present	Incumbent
Political offices
Preceded by Svandís Svavarsdóttir	Minister of the Environment and Natural Resources; 2013–2014	Succeeded by Sigrún Magnúsdóttir
Preceded by Steingrímur J. Sigfússon	Minister of Fisheries and Agriculture; 2013–2016	Succeeded by Gunnar Bragi Sveinsson
Preceded by Sigmundur Davíð Gunnlaugsson	Prime Minister of Iceland; 2016–2017	Succeeded by Bjarni Benediktsson
Preceded by Jón Gunnarsson	Minister of Transport and Local Government; 2017–2021	Succeeded by Himself as Minister of Infrastructure
Preceded by Himself as Minister of Transport and Local Government	Minister of Infrastructure; 2021–2024	Succeeded by Svandís Svavarsdóttir
Preceded by Þórdís Kolbrún R. Gylfadóttir	Minister of Finance and Economic Affairs; 2024	Succeeded by Daði Már Kristófersson
Preceded by Svandís Svavarsdóttir	Minister of Infrastructure; 2024	Succeeded by Eyjólfur Ármannsson as Minister of Transport and Local Government
