= Herdis Thorgeirsdottir =

Icelandic lawyer and political scientist

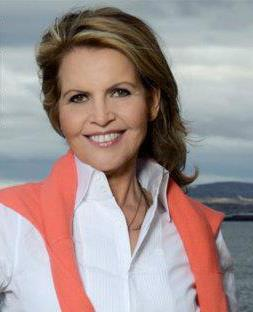

Herdis Kjerulf Thorgeirsdottir (Icelandic: Herdís Kjerulf Þorgeirsdóttir; born February 18, 1954, in Reykjavík, Iceland) is an Icelandic lawyer and political scientist who has developed an international reputation in promoting freedom of expression and human rights in general.

She was appointed a professor of law at Bifröst University in 2004; teaching courses in constitutional law and comparative constitutional law as well as courses in business and human rights. She has served on the board of trustees of the Academy of European Law and represented Iceland at the Venice Commission. She was elected vice president of the Venice Commission in 2013 and re-elected in 2015. In 2017 she was elected First Vice-President. In 2009, she was elected president of the European Women Lawyers Association (EWLA). She was re-elected for a second term in 2011.

She was one of six candidates in the 2012 Icelandic presidential election.

== Bibliography ==
- Thorgeirsdottir, Herdis (2005). Journalism Worthy of the Name: Freedom within the Press and the Affirmative Side of Article 10 of the European Convention on Human Rights. Raoul Wallenberg Institute Human Rights Library.
- Thorgeirsdottir, Herdis (2005). Journalism Worthy of the Name. Martinus Nijhoff.
- Thorgeirsdottir, Herdis (2006). Commentary on the United Nations Convention on the Rights of the Child: v.13: The Right to Freedom of Expression: Vol 13. September 29.
