= 2000 Icelandic presidential election =

← 1996	2000	2004 →
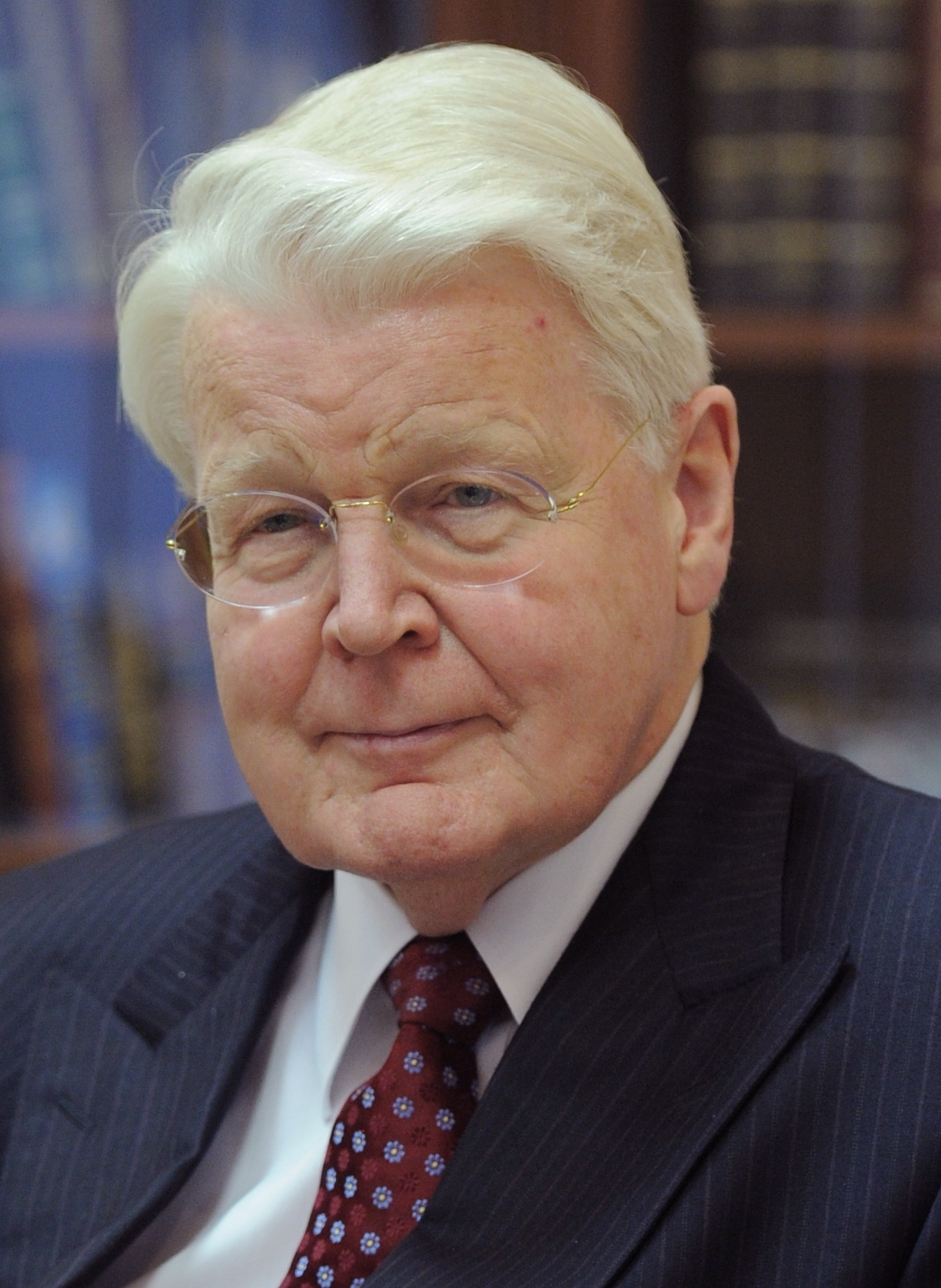
Candidate	Ólafur Ragnar Grímsson
Popular vote	Unopposed
President before election
Ólafur Ragnar Grímsson
Elected President
Ólafur Ragnar Grímsson

Presidential elections were scheduled to be held in Iceland in 2000. However, incumbent president Ólafur Ragnar Grímsson was the only candidate and the election was uncontested.
