= Gunnar Bragi Sveinsson =

Icelandic politician (born 1968)

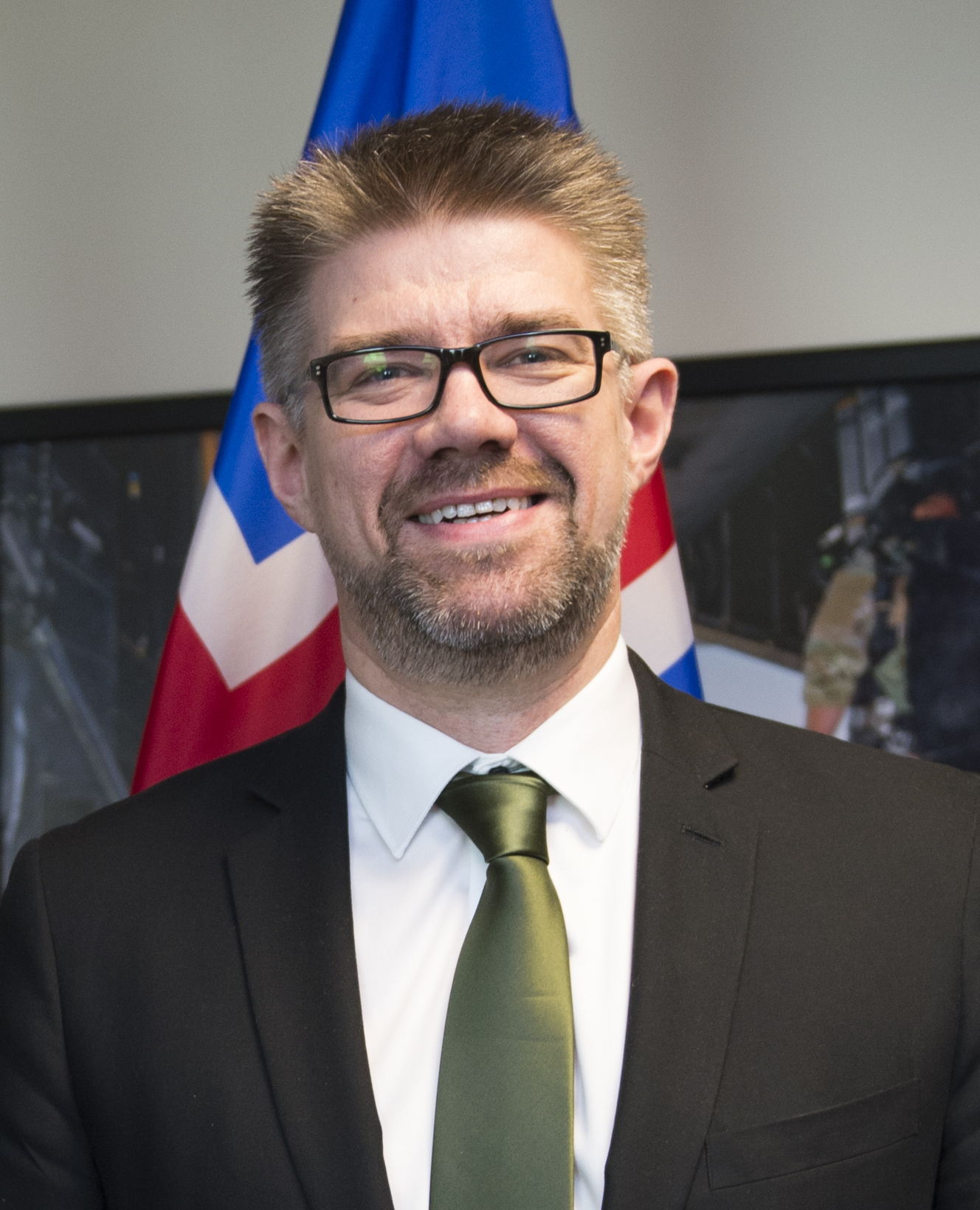

Minister of Fisheries and Agriculture
- In office 7 April 2016 – 11 January 2017
- Prime Minister: Sigurður Ingi Jóhannsson
- Preceded by: Sigurður Ingi Jóhannsson
- Succeeded by: Þorgerður Katrín Gunnarsdóttir

Minister of Foreign Affairs
- In office 23 May 2013 – 7 April 2016
- Prime Minister: Sigmundur Davíð Gunnlaugsson
- Preceded by: Össur Skarphéðinsson
- Succeeded by: Lilja Dögg Alfreðsdóttir

Personal details
- Born: 9 June 1968 (age 57) Sauðárkrókur, Iceland
- Party: Progressive Party (until 2017); Centre Party

Gunnar Bragi Sveinsson (born 9 June 1968) is an Icelandic politician for the Centre Party.

He is a member of the Althingi (Iceland's parliament) for the Centre Party for the Northwest of Iceland constituency since 2017. He was the chairman of the Progressive Party from 2009 to 2013. On 23 May 2013, Gunnar Bragi was appointed the minister for foreign affairs. In 2017, he joined the Centre Party formed by his close friend Sigmundur Davíð Gunnlaugsson and ran for party in the 2017 elections. He is currently chairman of the Center Party parliamentary group.

Political offices
Preceded by Össur Skarphéðinsson	Minister for Foreign Affairs; 2013–2016	Succeeded by Lilja Dögg Alfreðsdóttir
