= Elísabet Jökulsdóttir =

Icelandic author and journalist (born 1958)

Elísabet Kristín Jökulsdóttir is an Icelandic author and journalist born in Reykjavík on 16 April 1958. She lived in Greece for a year in her youth and had a variety of jobs before writing. Her first book of poems came out in 1989. She has written short stories, novels, and plays since then. She is best known for her poetry, freelance journalism, and theatrical work.

Elísabet is the daughter of author and journalist Jóhanna Kristjónsdóttir and playwright Jökull Jakobsson, and mother to three sons.

She was a candidate for the Icelandic presidential election in 2016.
