= Thóra Arnórsdóttir =

Icelandic media personality and politician

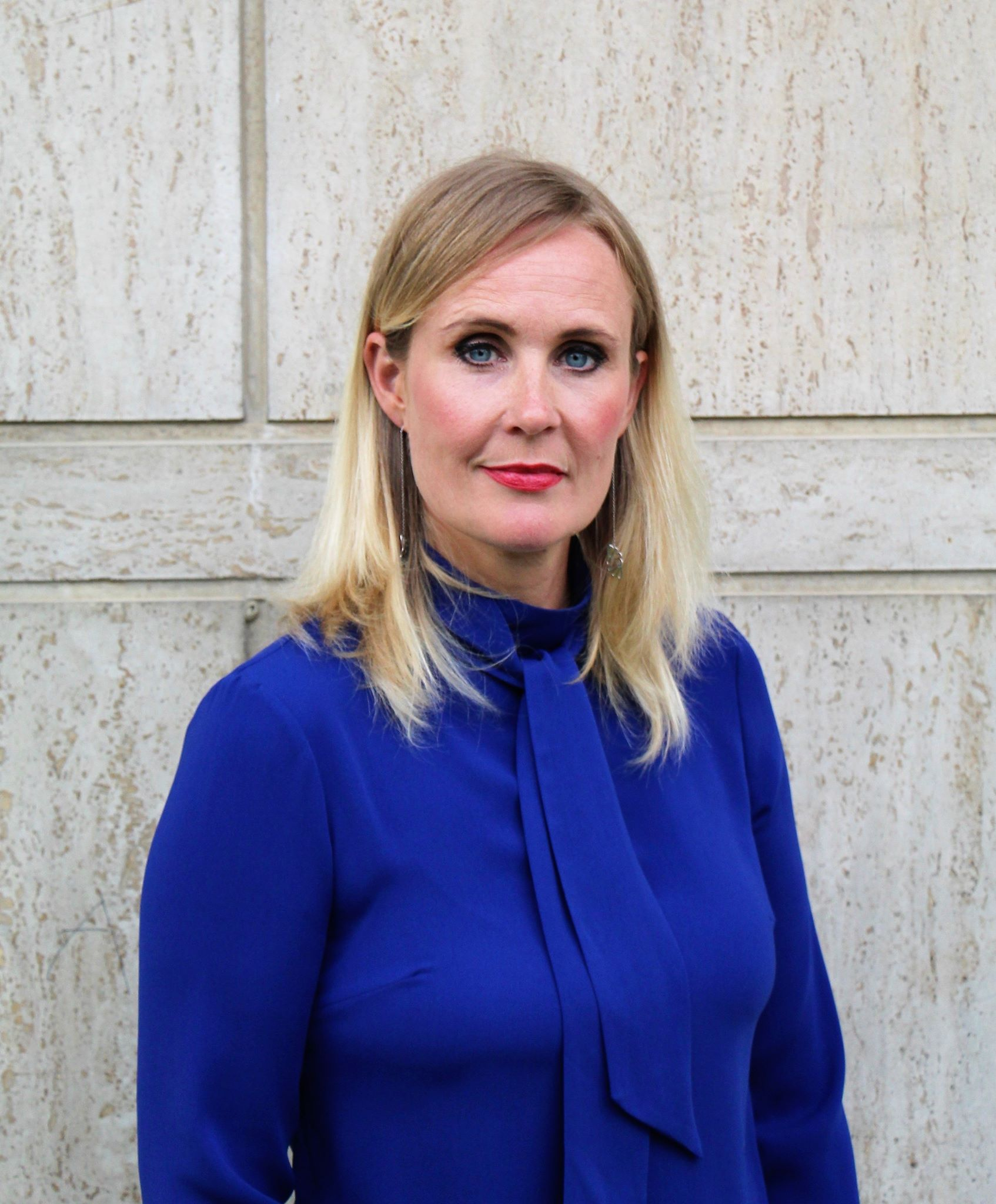
- Born: 18 February 1975 (age 51); Reykjavík, Iceland
- Education: University of Iceland; Johns Hopkins University
- Partner: Svavar Halldórsson

Thóra Arnórsdóttir (Þóra Arnórsdóttir; born 18 February 1975), is an Icelandic documentary film maker, media personality who contested the presidential election in June 2012.

== Career ==
She has worked as a journalist and news editor at the Icelandic National Broadcasting Service and is currently the managing editor of Kveikur, an investigative journalism TV program on the station. At Kveikur, Thora was responsible for reporting on the Panama Papers which ultimately led to the resignation of the then prime minister of Iceland and the Fishrot Files that exposed corrupt links between the Namibian government and Samherji, one of Iceland's largest fishing companies.

Thora was elected as a Yale World Fellow in 2014. She has also been a lecturer at the University of Iceland on International Relations and Globalization and works internationally as moderator and MC at various events.

Thora is also founder and owner of Hugveitan, a documentary production company that has created films including Hrunið (The Crash), a TV-series on the economic crash in Iceland in 2008, At the Bottom of the Fiord: The Last Farmers in Ísafjardardjup and Pioneers – a series on the women that paved the road in Iceland in various fields. All were nominated to an Edda-prize, Iceland's TV and Film awards. She was the host of Útsvar, Iceland’s most popular quiz show for a decade, from 2007-2017. She was nominated as TV-personality of the Year in 2007, 2010, 2011 and 2012 and won the “Peoples´ Choice Award” in 2012 – and nominated for the Journalist Awards in 2009 and 2010.

On 4 April 2012 she announced she would stand against the incumbent, Ólafur Ragnar Grímsson, for the Presidency of Iceland. The president is elected directly by the public and traditionally, the incumbent would not be challenged. This changed in 2012 because of widespread dissatisfaction with the president after 16 years in office, with five candidates challenging him. Thora Arnorsdottir got a third of the votes and was a strong runner-up, despite being pregnant with her third child and giving birth to a daughter during the campaign.

== Education ==
She has a B.A. degree in philosophy from the University of Iceland, an MA degree in international and development economics from the Johns Hopkins University Paul H. Nitze School of Advanced International Studies, Bologna, Italy, and Washington, DC, USA, where she studied on a Fulbright Scholarship. She was also elected for the prestigious Yale World Fellowship for mid-career global leaders in 2014.

== Personal life ==
She has three children with her partner Svavar Halldórsson, who is also a reporter with RUV, and three step-daughters from her partner's previous marriage.

Her father Arnór Hannibalsson was a philosopher, and professor of philosophy at the University of Iceland. Her grandfather Hannibal Valdimarsson, was a trade union leader, member of parliament and government minister. Her uncle is Jón Baldvin Hannibalsson, former Finance Minister and Minister for Foreign Affairs. Her mother was Nína S. Sveinsdóttir (1935-2018), a business administration graduate from the University of Iceland and a lifelong teacher. She has four older brothers. One of her brothers is comicbook artist Kjartan 'Karno' Arnorsson.
