= Global Creative Leadership Summit =

The Global Creative Leadership Summit, also known as the Blouin Creative Leadership Summit (BCLS), is an annual gathering of around 120 leading figures in the areas of science, technology, culture, business and government, meant to address the challenges and opportunities presented by globalization. The event is hosted and organized by the Louise Blouin Foundation, a nonprofit organization founded by art magazine publisher Louise Blouin. In partnership with the United Nations Office for Partnerships, the summit opens with a series of keynote speeches addressing the threats and opportunities of globalization. Over the following two days, delegates discuss global issues.

Between the years of 2005 and 2016, the Global Creative Leadership Summit was hosted annually by the Louise Blouin Foundation. Following the 2016 annual event, the summit seemingly ceased operation, with no public statement released regarding its end. The Global Creative Leadership website became inactive in September 2020. There is little public information available regarding the current status of both the summit and the foundation is unclear. Despite Louise Blouin's claims in 2024 that the charity organization remains active, its last known tax filing was in 2017.
