= Kastljós =

- Starring: Þóra Arnórsdóttir; Helgi Seljan; Helga Arnardóttir; Baldvin Þór; Einar Þorsteinsson; Jóhanna Vigdís Hjaltadóttir
- Country of origin: Iceland
- No. of episodes: n/a (airs four times a week)

Production
- Running time: approx. 15–45 minutes (varies)

Original release
- Network: Sjónvarpið
- Release: 2005 – present

Kastljós (English: Spotlight) is an Icelandic news magazine and talk show on the Icelandic national television channel RÚV. Þóra Arnórsdóttir is the current editor and former host of the show. The hosts for 2019–2020 were Einar Þorsteinsson and Jóhanna Vigdís Hjaltadóttir. The show is broadcast live four nights a week, Monday through Thursday, at 7:35 p.m.

== List of celebrities interviewed on the show ==
- Cliff Richard (2007)
- Daniel Tammet (2007)
- Roger Moore
- Daft Punk
- Josh Groban (2007)
- Silvía Night
- Sissel Kyrkjebø (2006)
- Yoko Ono
- Björk (2008)
