= Arnór Hannibalsson =

Icelandic philosopher and historian

- Born: 24 March 1934
- Died: 28 December 2012 (aged 78)
- Occupations: Philosopher, historian

Arnór Hannibalsson (1934 – 28 December 2012) was an Icelandic philosopher, historian, and translator. He was a professor of philosophy at the University of Iceland. He completed a master's degree in philosophy at the University of Moscow and a doctorate in philosophy at the University of Edinburgh in Scotland.

He was predominantly concerned with aesthetics, philosophy, history and epistemology. In 1975 he translated Roman Ingarden's On the Motives which led Husserl to Transcendental Idealism from Polish. He also contributed to journals with articles such as "Icelandic Historical Science in the Postwar Period, 1944-1957".

Arnór had strong anti-Communist views and was said to have been "extremely critical of the Icelandic Socialists" in his 1999/2000 book Moskvulínan: Kommúnistaflokkur Íslands og Komintern, Halldór Laxness og Sovétríkin.

He was the son of Hannibal Valdimarsson, a former minister, and had several sons and one daughter, Thora Arnorsdottir.

He died on 28 December 2012.

== Main publications ==
- 1978 Rökfræðileg aðferðafræði (Logical Methodology)
- 1979 Siðfræði vísinda (Ethics of Science)
- 1985 Heimspeki félagsvísinda (Philosophy of Society)
- 1985 Um rætur þekkingar (The Roots of Knowledge)
- 1987 Fagurfræði (Aesthetics)
- 1987 Söguspeki (History Wisdom)
- 1999 Moskvulínan: Kommúnistaflokkur Íslands og Komintern, Halldór Laxness og Sovétríkin (Moscow Line: The Communist Party of Iceland and the Comintern, Halldór Laxness and the Soviet Union)
