= Sigmundur Davíð Gunnlaugsson =

Prime Minister of Iceland from 2013 to 2016

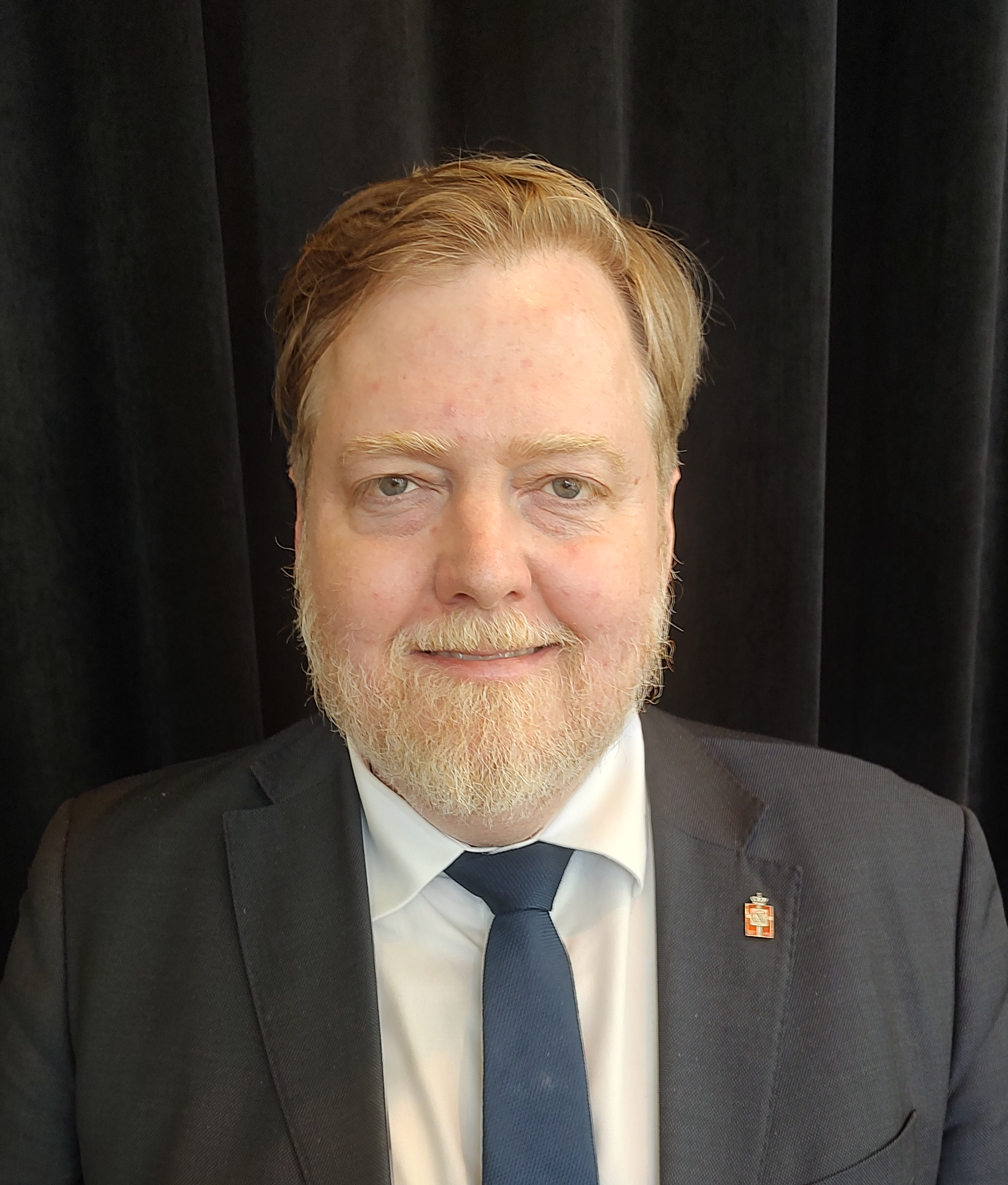
- Sigmundur Davíð in 2023

Leader of the Centre Party
- Incumbent
- Assumed office 24 September 2017
- Preceded by: Office established

Prime Minister of Iceland
- In office 23 May 2013 – 7 April 2016
- President: Ólafur Ragnar Grímsson
- Preceded by: Jóhanna Sigurðardóttir
- Succeeded by: Sigurður Ingi Jóhannsson

Minister of Justice
- In office 26 August 2014 – 4 December 2014
- President: Ólafur Ragnar Grímsson
- Preceded by: Hanna Birna Kristjánsdóttir (Interior)
- Succeeded by: Ólöf Nordal (Interior)

Leader of the Progressive Party
- In office 18 January 2009 – 2 October 2016
- Preceded by: Valgerður Sverrisdóttir
- Succeeded by: Sigurður Ingi Jóhannsson

Member of the Althing
- Incumbent
- Assumed office 25 April 2009

Personal details
- Born: 12 March 1975 (age 51) Reykjavík, Iceland
- Party: Centre (since 2017)
- Other political affiliations: Progressive (2007–2017)
- Spouse: Anna Sigurlaug Pálsdóttir
- Relations: Nanna Margrét Gunnlaugsdóttir (sister)
- Children: 1
- Education: University of Iceland; Wolfson College, Oxford; University of Cambridge

Sigmundur Davíð Gunnlaugsson ([ˈsɪɣmʏntʏr ˈtaːvið ˈkʏnlœyxˌsɔːn]; born 12 March 1975) is an Icelandic politician who was the prime minister of Iceland from May 2013 until April 2016. He was also chairman of the Progressive Party from 2009 to October 2016. He was elected to the Althing (Iceland's parliament) as the 8th member for the Reykjavík North Constituency on 25 April 2009. Taking office at 38, he was the third youngest Icelander to become prime minister.

Following the release of the Panama Papers, he announced on 5 April 2016 that he would resign as prime minister amid public outrage at him for owning an offshore company to shelter money and not disclosing that when entering parliament. On 7 April 2016, he was replaced as prime minister by Sigurður Ingi Jóhannsson, who also replaced him as chairman of the Progressive Party on 2 October 2016, following a defeat after he had campaigned to continue as leader. Just before the 2017 parliamentary election, he left the Progressive Party and founded the Centre Party; and is currently that party's leader.

== Early life ==
Sigmundur Davíð is the son of former member of the Icelandic parliament Gunnlaugur M. Sigmundsson.

Sigmundur Davíð holds a bachelor's degree in business administration from the University of Iceland. He participated in a student exchange with the University of Copenhagen to Plekhanov University in Moscow, and also studied at Wolfson College, Oxford, though he did not earn a degree there. He was a Chevening scholar at the University of Cambridge in 2004.

Sigmundur Davíð became a news reporter for Iceland's state broadcasting service in May 2000 before working on the current affairs program Kastljós intermittently from 2002 to 2007. He was president of the Nordic Economics Students' Union from 2000 to 2002 and a member of the Reykjavík City Planning Council from 2008 to 2010.

== Political career ==
Sigmundur Davíð first rose to prominence in Iceland as a spokesperson for the InDefence movement, which fought foreign creditors' attempts to make Iceland pay £2.3 billion in compensation to the United Kingdom and the Netherlands following the collapse and subsequent nationalisation of Iceland's three banks. As Eirikur Bergmann wrote in The Guardian, "This was the most serious diplomatic crisis the country had ever fought and Gunnlaugsson was at the forefront of it." He and his wife Anna Sigurlaug Pálsdóttir already owned the offshore company Wintris at the time, having bought it in 2007 from Mossack Fonseca through the Luxembourg branch of Landsbanki and registered it in the British Virgin Islands.

He was elected chairman of the Progressive Party on 18 January 2009 with 40.9% of party member votes, beating Höskuldur Þórhallsson (37.9%). On 22 January 2009, Sigmundur Davíð proposed the support of the Progressive Party's seven votes in the Althing for a minority coalition between the Social Democratic Alliance and the Left-Green Movement, as an alternative to the ruling coalition between the Independence Party and the Social Democratic Alliance, with the aim of forcing early elections. The next day, Prime Minister Geir Haarde announced elections for 9 May 2009, in which for health reasons he would not be a candidate.

The unstable króna during the banking and financial crisis led some to propose adopting the euro. But Jürgen Stark of the European Central Bank said this would require joining the European Union. As of May 2012, Iceland did not meet any of the convergence criteria. The country managed to comply with the deficit criteria in 2013 and had begun to decrease its debt-to-GDP ratio, but still had elevated HICP inflation and long-term governmental interest rates.

In the 27 April 2013 Althing elections, the Progressive Party and Independence Party each won 19 seats. On 30 April President Ólafur Ragnar Grímsson asked Sigmundur Davíð to form a new government. On 23 May 2013, Sigmundur Davíð, as chairman of the Progressive Party, became Iceland's new prime minister while the leader of the Independence Party, Bjarni Benediktsson, took up the position of Minister of Finance and Economic Affairs. At 38 years old, Sigmundur Davíð was the youngest prime minister in the history of the Icelandic Republic and the world's youngest democratically elected head of government at the time.

Sigmundur Davíð said in 2013 that talks with creditors were proceeding more slowly than he would like. Many of the banks' original creditors sold the debt at a steep discount to foreign hedge funds, and a writedown was "necessary" because paying off all of the banks' liabilities would cause currency collapse because of the amount of Icelandic krónur that would be converted in making the payments.

Sigmundur Davíð called for increased regional co-operation among Nordic and Baltic Sea countries in a 2014 journal article, through bodies such as the Council of the Baltic Sea States, the Barents Euro-Arctic Council, the Nordic Dimension and the Arctic Council.

=== Panama Papers revelations ===
Sigmundur Davíð was interviewed in April 2016 by the Swedish television station SVTs investigative programme Uppdrag granskning. The interviewer told Sigmundur Davíð that the interview would focus on Iceland's recovery after its financial crisis. During this interview, Sigmundur Davíð said it was very important for everyone to pay a fair share into society and that paying less than one's share constituted cheating society.

When the interviewer asked if he had any connections to a foreign company, he replied that his financial assets had always been reported transparently. When asked specifically about his connections to Wintris, a foreign company and a creditor of failed Icelandic banks, he said he had disclosed all requested information to the government and was unsure how the transactions actually worked. Sigmundur Davíð then said the interviewer was making something suspicious out of nothing, and walked out of the interview. He and his wife both made public statements about "journalist encroachment in their private lives" and insisted their disclosures were complete.

News coverage of the release of the Panama Papers had revealed that he and his wife shared ownership of Wintris, bought to invest his wife's inheritance, and also that Sigmundur Davíð had failed to disclose his 50% share when he entered the parliament in 2009. Eight months later, he sold his share of the company to his wife for one US dollar, the day before a new law took effect that would have required him to disclose his ownership as a conflict of interest.

In 2015, he entered into an agreement with the creditors of failed Icelandic banks, including his wife. According to RÚV, Wintris Inc. has registered a claim of ISK 174 million (US$1.37 million, €1.23 million) as a bond holder against the assets of the bankruptcy estate of Landsbanki. It is claiming a total of 515 million Icelandic krónur (£3m) between the three failed Icelandic banks: Landsbanki, Glitnir, and Kaupthing. These banks had a total business volume nine times Iceland's gross domestic product just before they collapsed and the country had to obtain a loan from the IMF to stabilise its currency. The króna collapsed after the bank failure, which led to very high inflation of 18% to 20% for six months to a year.

=== Resignation ===
Following the Panama Papers revelations, there were widespread calls for Sigmundur Davíð to resign. Former Prime Minister of Iceland Jóhanna Sigurðardóttir was among those making them. Sigmundur Davíð said he would not resign. He apologised for his behaviour during the interview however, saying that he should not have left. Under growing pressure, with large anti-government protests in front of the parliament, and calls for a snap election from the Althing, Sigmundur Davíð asked President Ólafur Ragnar Grímsson to dissolve parliament. He refused, noting he "was not ready to agree to [dissolving parliament] until [he] had discussions with the leaders of other parties on their stand".

Sigmundur Davíð stepped aside as Prime Minister on 5 April 2016. Shortly after initial reports of Sigmundur Davíð's resignation, the Prime Minister's office in Iceland issued a statement to the international press saying that Sigmundur Davíð had not resigned, but rather stepped aside for an unspecified amount of time and would continue to serve as the Chairman of the Progressive Party. He refused to talk to the Icelandic National Broadcasting Service, and called police when he found reporters from Aftenposten waiting for him at his home.

Ingólfur Bjarni Sigfússon of the Icelandic National Broadcasting Service told an Australian news program that the lesson of the Panama Papers is that "people aren't ready to accept their double morality, that one set of rules applies to us and another set applies to them. They better play by the rules, they better be honest, they better pay their taxes, they better not try to use their positions to curry favour with someone or privatise state belongings." Iceland's government named Sigurður Ingi Jóhannsson as interim Prime Minister on 6 April 2016 and called for early autumn elections, effectively ending Sigmundur Davíð's role as PM. It was suggested that autumn elections would give the government "time to follow through on one of the biggest economic policy changes within Iceland in decades".

=== Post-premiership ===
Since his resignation as Prime Minister and loss of his party chairmanship, Sigmundur Davíð has repeatedly asserted that he was the victim of a global conspiracy to bring him down. He has implied that George Soros, "banking elites", the Swedish public broadcaster, the International Consortium of Investigative Journalists and the Icelandic public broadcaster conspired against him. In February 2017, Sigmundur Davíð said that there had been a "hostile takeover" of the Progressive Party and that the current leadership of the party no longer reflects the will of the majority of the party members. In March 2017, Sigmundur Davíð further alleged that the SVTs Uppdrag granskning interview was "falsified", and that the interviewers had practised how to confuse him as much as they could.

In September 2017, after the announcement of a snap election, Sigmundur Davíð stated in an open letter on his website that he was seeking to form a new political party before the 2017 Icelandic parliamentary election. His new party, the Centre Party Miðflokkurinn, has been described as "populist". Miðflokkurinn finished fifth in the 2017 parliamentary election with seven candidates, including Sigmundur Davíð, being elected to the Althing. It received 10.9% of the vote, slightly ahead of the Progressive Party. Since 2017, Sigmundur Davíð has been a member of the Icelandic Division of the International Parliamentary Assembly.

In December 2018, a leaked recording captured four Centre Party MPs, including Sigmundur Davíð, mocking a disabled woman and other women using denigrating and sexually charged language. The scandal became known as the Klaustur Affair.

Sigmundur has spoken strongly against the European Union's third energy packet and argued that its main purpose would be EU domination of Icelandic energy sources. He also argued that the third energy packet would be in contradiction of the Icelandic constitution. In the spring of 2019 the Centre party held filibuster speeches for over 130 hours about the subject in the Althing. In July 2019, he criticised the Paris Climate Accords as pointless, despite having signed it himself during his premiership, and argued that actions taken to curb climate change will not have an impact.

In 2020, he characterised the Black Lives Matter movement as racist and compared that year's Black Lives Matter protests in the United States to the Cultural Revolution in China.

His Centre party faced a big defeat in the 2021 parliamentary election, only receiving 5.4% of the popular vote and electing three MPs. One of those MPs left the party to join the Independence Party in October 2021, leaving only two Centre Party MPs, including Sigmundur, in parliament. In polls leading up to the snap election in 2024, the party ranged from 18.7% to 11.1%, ultimately receiving 12.1% of the vote and electing eight MPs, up from two MPs. As of December 2025, the Centre Party is polling at 19.5% support nationwide.

== Personal life ==
Sigmundur Davíð and Anna Sigurlaug lived in the United Kingdom when Wintris was established, Anna Sigurlaug said in a Facebook post on 15 March. She said it was unclear at the time whether the couple would return to the UK or move to Denmark.

In the 2024 Icelandic parliamentary election, his sister Nanna Margrét Gunnlaugsdóttir joined him in the Althing.

According to Vísir, Anna Sigurlaug is one of Iceland's wealthiest women; she received a share of the proceeds when her father, who owned the sole Toyota dealership in Iceland, sold it in 2005.

Party political offices
Preceded by Position Established	Leader of the Centre Party; 2017–present	Succeeded by Incumbent
Preceded by Valgerður Sverrisdóttir	Leader of the Progressive Party; 2009–2016	Succeeded by Sigurður Ingi Jóhannsson
Political offices
Preceded by Jóhanna Sigurðardóttir	Prime Minister of Iceland; 2013–2016	Succeeded by Sigurður Ingi Jóhannsson
