= 1996 Icelandic presidential election =

← 1992	29 June 1996	2000 →
- Turnout: 85.94%
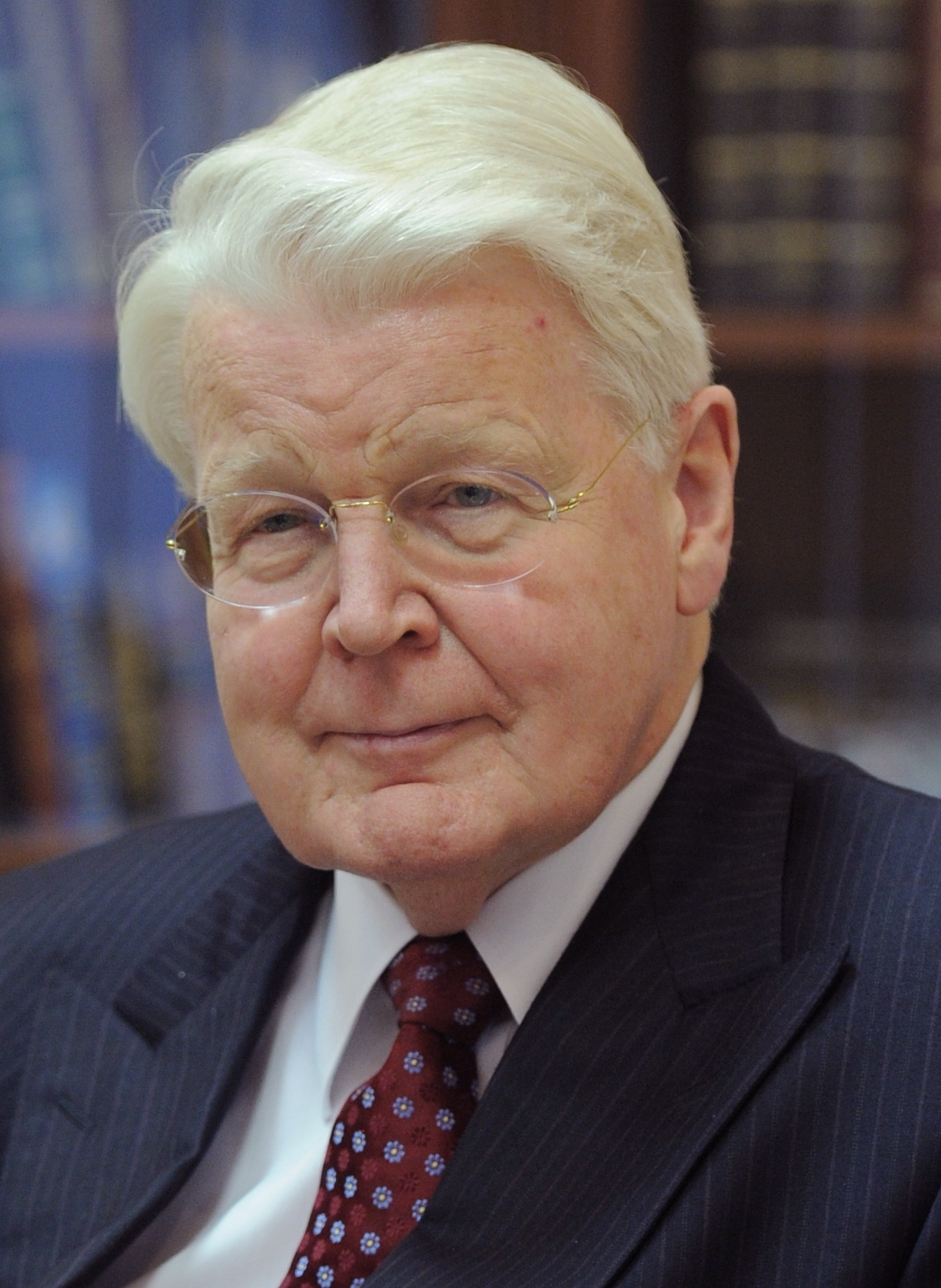

Candidate	Ólafur Ragnar Grímsson	Pétur Hafstein	Guðrún Agnarsdóttir
Popular vote	68,370	48,863	43,578
Percentage	41.38%	29.57%	26.37%
President before election
Vigdís Finnbogadóttir
Elected President
Ólafur Ragnar Grímsson

Presidential elections were held in Iceland on 29 June 1996. The result was a victory for Ólafur Ragnar Grímsson, who received 41.4% of the vote.

== Electoral system ==
The President of Iceland is elected in one round by first-past-the-post voting.

== Campaign ==
Prime minister Davíð Oddsson and former foreign minister Jón Baldvín Hannibalsson considered running in the election. Guðrún Pétursdóttir, an academic, ran, but withdrew from the race ten days prior to the election date.

Ólafur was considered a left-wing politician at the time, having been the leader of the left-wing People's Alliance from 1987 to 1995. Guðrún Agnarsdóttir, a former member of parliament for the Women's List, was considered on the left as well. Pétur Hafstein announced his candidacy shortly after Davíð decided not to run. Pétur was a Supreme Court judge, and was expected to appeal to voters of the conservative Independence Party. Ólafur's campaign was described by political scientist Ólafur Harðarson as "Americanized", as Ólafur emphasized his personal qualities rather than his political background and views.

== Results ==
Candidate	Votes	%
Ólafur Ragnar Grímsson	68,370	41.38
Pétur Hafstein	48,863	29.57
Guðrún Agnarsdóttir	43,578	26.37
Ástþór Magnússon	4,422	2.68
Total	165,233	100.00
Valid votes	165,233	98.74
Invalid/blank votes	2,101	1.26
Total votes	167,334	100.00
Registered voters/turnout	194,705	85.94
Source: Nohlen & Stöver
