= 2004 Icelandic presidential election =

Presidential election in Iceland

← 2000	26 June 2004	2008 →
- Turnout: 62.92%
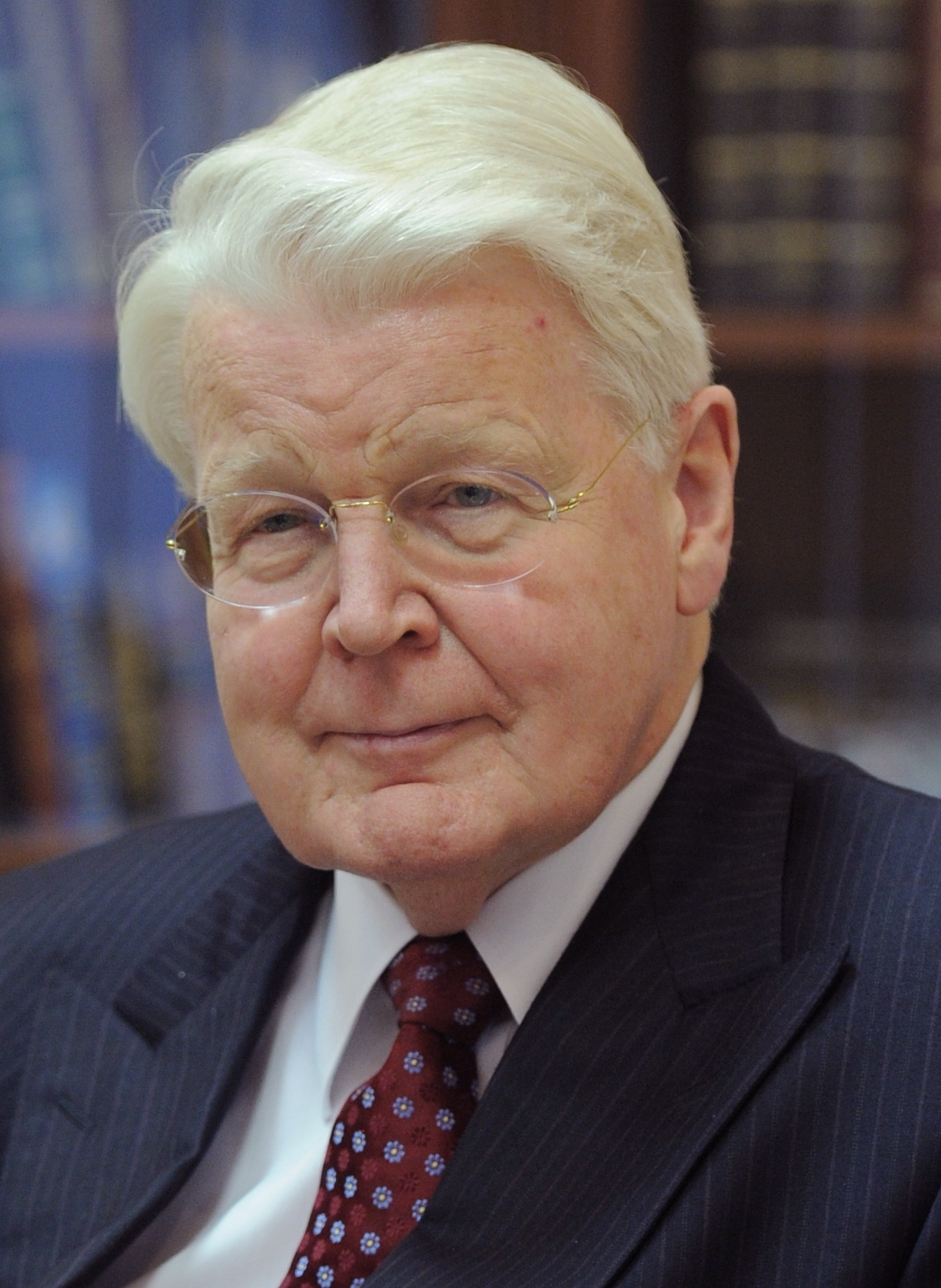

Candidate	Ólafur Ragnar Grímsson	Baldur Ágústsson
Popular vote	90,662	13,250
Percentage	85.60%	12.51%
President before election
Ólafur Ragnar Grímsson
Elected President
Ólafur Ragnar Grímsson

Presidential elections were held in Iceland on Saturday, 26 June 2004.

Traditionally, Icelandic presidential elections in which the incumbent president indicates a wish to obtain a new mandate are uncontested. The incumbent president, Ólafur Ragnar Grímsson, was first elected in 1996 with 41.4% of the vote, in an election with an 85.9% turnout contested by four candidates. In 2000 he was re-elected without opposition. When Ólafur Ragnar announced his intention to seek another mandate in 2004, two other candidates emerged:

Ástþór Magnússon, a businessman and peace activist, who won 2.6% of the vote in the 1996 election and failed to obtain the necessary 1,500 supporters when he attempted to stand in the 2000 election, and
Baldur Ágústsson, a businessman who was essentially unknown to the general public.

Unlike parliamentary elections in Iceland, presidential elections are not fought on the basis of party politics; instead, candidates attempt to use their personalities to attract supporters and appear as a living symbol of national unity.

By tradition, the presidency is an almost entirely powerless office, as the presidents almost never use the powers granted to them by the constitution, instead just exercising moral authority. Ólafur Ragnar, however, has expressed a wish to have a public discussion on the role of the head of state. Unprecedentedly in the history of the Icelandic Republic, on 2 June 2004 Ólafur Ragnar vetoed a media ownership law passed by the Althing. Davíð Oddsson, who was Prime Minister at the time, claimed that the veto was tainted because the president's daughter worked for Baugur Group, which had recently acquired roughly half of the country's media. There was little doubt that Ólafur Ragnar would be re-elected, but the veto controversy had an effect on the voting – the unprecedentedly high number of empty ballots (20.6% of the total) was thought to be largely a protest of the veto.

== Electoral system ==
The President of Iceland is elected in one round by first-past-the-post voting.

== Results ==
Candidate	Votes	%
Ólafur Ragnar Grímsson	90,662	85.60
Baldur Ágústsson	13,250	12.51
Ástþór Magnússon	2,001	1.89
Total	105,913	100.00
Valid votes	105,913	78.82
Invalid/blank votes	28,461	21.18
Total votes	134,374	100.00
Registered voters/turnout	213,553	62.92
Source: Nohlen & Stöver
