= Ólafur Ragnar Grímsson =

President of Iceland from 1996 to 2016

His Excellency Ólafur Ragnar Grímsson
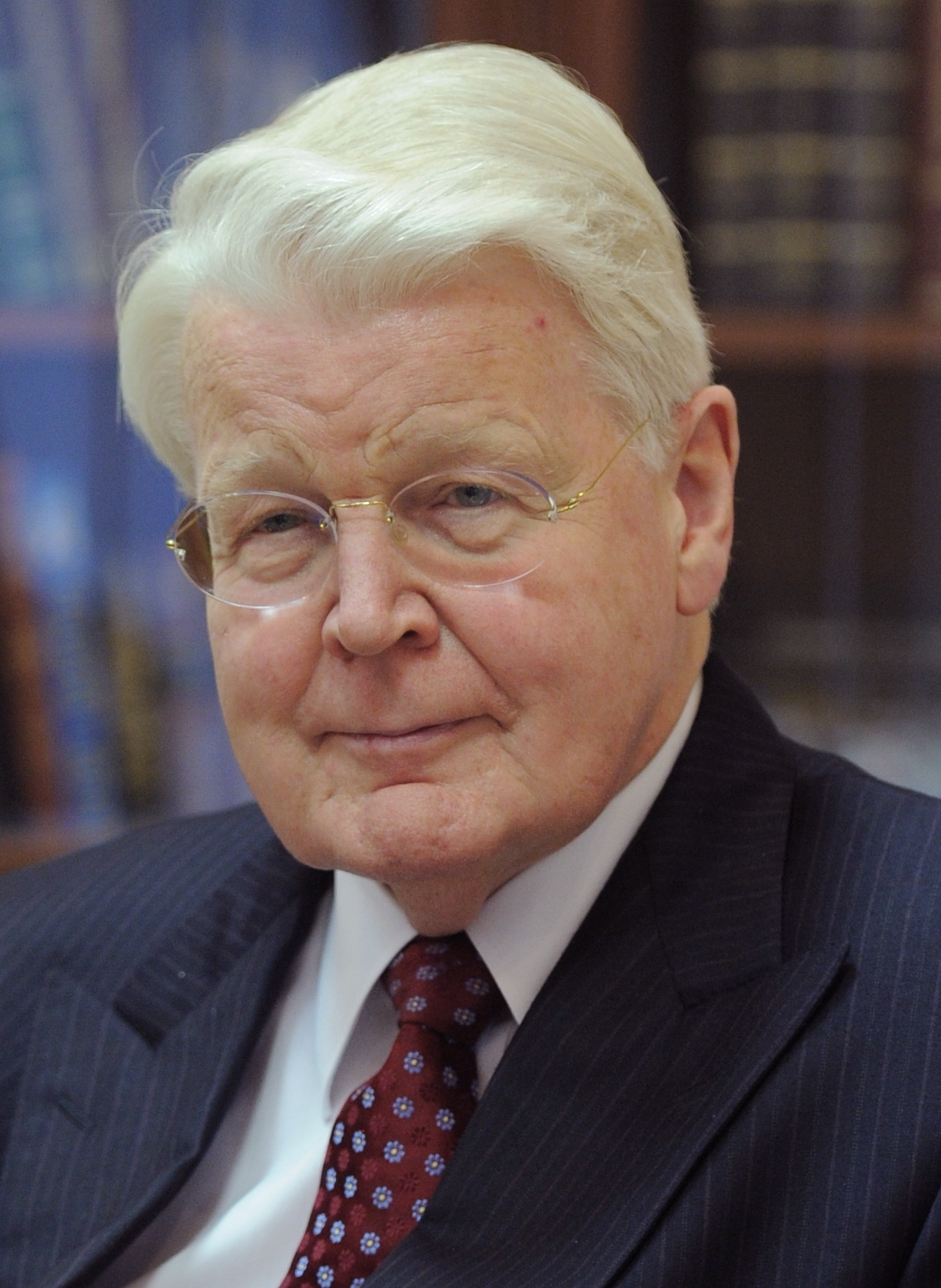
- Ólafur in 2011

5th President of Iceland
- In office 1 August 1996 – 1 August 2016
- Prime Minister: Davíð Oddsson; Halldór Ásgrímsson; Geir Haarde; Jóhanna Sigurðardóttir; Sigmundur Davíð Gunnlaugsson; Sigurður Ingi Jóhannsson
- Preceded by: Vigdís Finnbogadóttir
- Succeeded by: Guðni Th. Jóhannesson

Minister of Finance
- In office 28 September 1988 – 30 April 1991
- Prime Minister: Steingrímur Hermannsson
- Preceded by: Jón Baldvin Hannibalsson
- Succeeded by: Friðrik Klemenz Sophusson

Member of the Parliament for Reykjavík
- In office 20 April 1991 – 1 August 1996
- In office 25 June 1978 – 23 April 1983

Personal details
- Born: 14 May 1943 (age 83) Ísafjörður, Kingdom of Iceland
- Party: Progressive Party (bef. 1974); Liberals and Leftists (1974–1976); People's Alliance (1977–1996); Independent (1996–2016)
- Spouses: Guðrún Katrín Þorbergsdóttir (m. 1974; died 1998); Dorrit Moussaieff (m. 2003)
- Children: 2
- Education: University of Manchester (BA), DPhil)
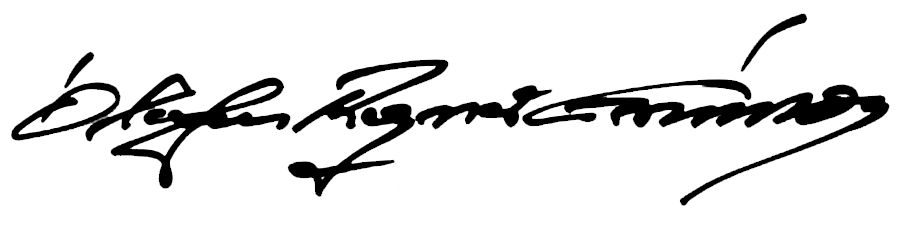
- Signature

Ólafur Ragnar Grímsson (Icelandic: [ˈouːlavʏr ˈraknar ˈkrimsɔn]; born 14 May 1943) is an Icelandic politician who was the fifth president of Iceland, serving from 1996 to 2016. He was previously a member of the Icelandic Parliament for the People's Alliance and served as Minister of Finance from 1988 to 1991.

Since the end of his presidency, Ólafur has been serving as Chairman of the Arctic Circle, a non-profit organization, and as Chairman of the International Renewable Energy Agency's Global Commission on the Geopolitics of Energy Transformation.

== Early life ==
Ólafur was born in Ísafjörður, the son of barber Grímur Kristgeirsson and housewife Svanhildur Ólafsdóttir Hjartar. He matriculated from Menntaskólinn í Reykjavík in 1962. From 1962 to 1970 he studied at the University of Manchester, obtaining a Bachelor of Arts degree in economics and political science in 1965 and a Doctor of Philosophy (PhD) degree in political science in 1970, thus becoming the first Icelander to earn a PhD in this field. He became a lecturer in political science at the University of Iceland in 1970, then a Professor of Political Science at the same university in 1973. He was the university's first Professor of Political Science.

== Political career ==
As part of the left-wing People's Alliance, Ólafur was a Member of Althing for Reykjavík from 1978 to 1983. During this time, from 1980 to 1983, he was Chairman of the People's Alliance parliamentary group. Subsequently, he was Chairman of the People's Alliance executive committee from 1983 to 1987; additionally, from 1983 to 1985 he was editor of a newspaper, Þjóðviljinn. From 1981 to 1984, he was also a member of the Parliamentary Assembly of the Council of Europe, serving again briefly from 1995 to 1996. In 1984, with three other left-wing intellectuals, he took part in a debate with economist Milton Friedman, who was in Iceland to give a lecture on the "tyranny of the status quo" at the University of Iceland.

Ólafur was chairman and later President of Parliamentarians for Global Action (PGA) from 1984 to 1990, serving on their council until 1996. In 1986, he received the Indira Gandhi Prize on behalf of the PGA. From 1987 to 1995, he was Leader of the People's Alliance. During this time, he served as Minister of Finance from 1988 to 1991. As Minister of Finance, he "was subjected to the idea that the rating agencies were the golden judges of financial health." He was re-elected as a Member of Althing for Reykjanes from 1991 to 1996.

== Presidency (1996–2016) ==
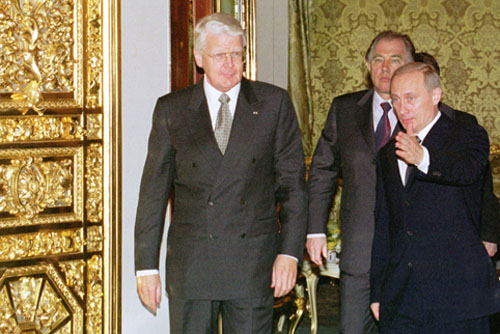
Ólafur with President of Russia Vladimir Putin at the Kremlin on 19 April 2002

=== 1996 election ===
In the 1996 presidential election, he was elected with 41.4% of the votes cast.

=== Re-election 2004 ===
In the 2004 presidential election, Ólafur was re-elected with 85.6% of the valid votes cast, but that election also saw a record number of empty/invalid ballots (21.2%) and an exceptionally low turnout of 62.9% (usually 80–90%), both of which have been interpreted as dissent with the president's decision not to sign a controversial media law. Since then, the issue of a constitutional amendment to revoke the veto power of the president has been raised by the Independence Party. Some have also wanted to rest that power with the people themselves, who could then force referendums to be held on laws by – for instance – collecting a certain number of signatures.

=== Re-election 2008 ===
On 1 January 2008, in his new year's address, Ólafur announced his intention to seek a fourth term in office later in 2008. Because there was no challenger, he was automatically re-elected and sworn in for another term on 1 August 2008.

=== Crisis of 2008 statements ===
After the 2008–2011 Icelandic financial crisis, Ólafur criticized other countries for lack of help to Iceland.

In early November 2008, the President attended a traditional informal lunch with all ambassadors to Iceland, held by the senior Danish ambassador. According to a confidential memo from the Norwegian embassy, quoted in the Norwegian newspaper Klassekampen, the President said: "The North Atlantic is important to Scandinavia, the US and Britain. This is a fact these countries now seem to ignore. Then, Iceland should rather get some new friends". He praised Norway and the Faroe Islands for their swift decision to grant major loans to Iceland. He also said Iceland should rather invite Russia to use the Keflavík Air Base. According to the memo, an "amazed and smiling" Russian ambassador said Russia did not have any need for this. Ólafur also criticised the International Monetary Fund for the system's flaws and for its mistreatment of Iceland. He said it was part of Icelandic political mentality to "fight alone" rather than being threatened into submission, and that he expected Iceland to overcome the crisis sooner than the US and Britain by showing initiative and international activity in new fields. The memo underlined that the President of Iceland has no political power and that no other government official had presented similar points of view "to the same degree". The Danish ambassador to Iceland, Lasse Reimann, confirmed to the daily Politiken that the lunch had taken place, but declined to discuss on the President's comments.

On 5 January 2010, the President of Iceland vetoed a measure of the Icelandic government to repay the governments of Britain and the Netherlands for their bailouts of customers of private Icelandic banks (no such bailout was required under Icelandic law, though on 26 May 2010 the EFTA found it was required by the terms of Iceland's membership of the EEA). The President's veto was upheld by the people of Iceland when they voted upon the measure in March 2010. This dispute is known as Icesave dispute.

On 20 February 2011, the President of Iceland again vetoed an effort by the Icelandic government to repay (in installments over a period of years) the governments of Britain and the Netherlands. In a referendum held on 9 April 2011, Icelanders rejected for a second time a proposal to pay $5 billion to Britain and the Netherlands. Nearly 60% of Icelanders rejected the proposal put forward by the government. The President's veto was thus upheld by the people.

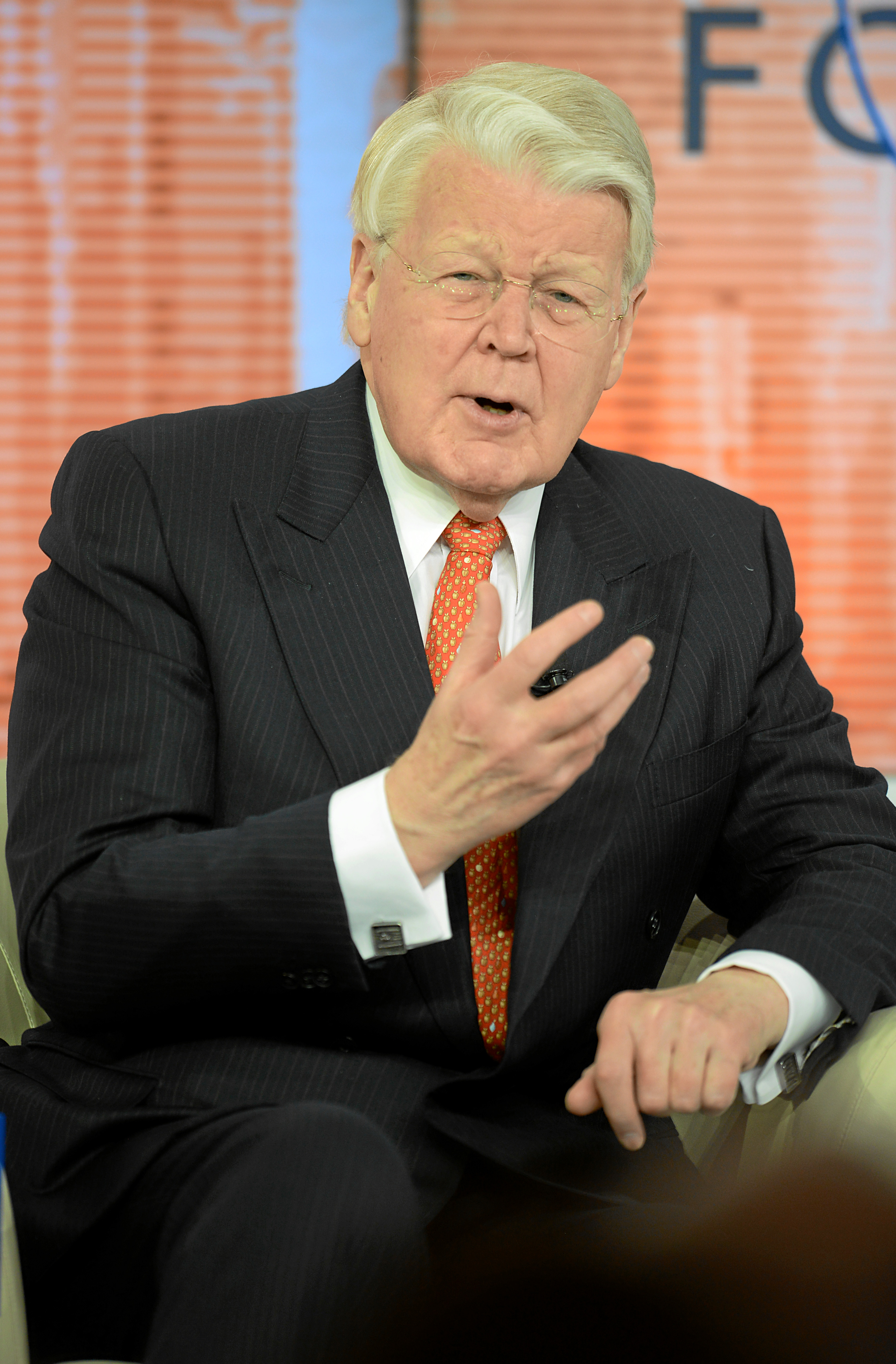
Ólafur during the WEF 2013

=== 2012 election ===
Ólafur Ragnar announced on 4 March 2012, that he would be seeking a fifth term as the President of Iceland in the 2012 presidential election. He received 52.78% of votes cast in the election, which took place on 30 June.

=== 2016 election and Panama Papers controversy ===
In a statement to the country on 1 January 2016, Ólafur Ragnar announced that he would not run in the 2016 presidential election, wanting "to transfer the responsibilities of the president onto other shoulders". He later withdrew the statement and decided in April to run again, citing political unrest after the fallout of the Panama Papers leak, which implicated Prime Minister Sigmundur Davíð Gunnlaugsson and led to his resignation after large anti-government protests. After Guðni Th. Jóhannesson and Davíð Oddsson announced their candidacies, he again changed his mind and on 9 May declared he would not run.

Reykjavik Grapevine and the news site Kjarninn revealed that Ólafur Ragnar's wife, Dorrit Moussaieff, had connections to an offshore company in the British Virgin Islands. Ólafur Ragnar had denied any personal or family ties to companies in tax havens. The company was owned by the parents of Dorrit. According to Kjarninn, the company, Lasca Finance, was in operation from 1999 to 2005. The financial statements of Moussaieff Jewelers Limited show it received almost £7 million (US$10.2 million or €9.1 million) in interest payments from Lasca in 2000–2005.

== Political views ==
Ólafur is a strong proponent for mitigating climate change.

In 2015, Ólafur expressed concern that Saudi Arabian financing of a mosque in Reykjavík will fuel radical Islam in Iceland, and said that he was, "shocked to the point of paralysis" when he learned the government of Saudi Arabia had decided to interfere in Icelandic religious life by donating one million US dollars for the mosque.

== Awards and decorations ==
=== National honours ===
- Iceland:
  - Collar with Grand Cross Breast Star of the Order of the Falcon

=== Foreign honours ===
Ólafur Ragnar Grímsson coat of arms as a knight of the Swedish Order of the Seraphim

- Denmark:
  - Knight of the Order of the Elephant
- Germany:
  - Grand Cross Special Class of the Order of Merit of the Federal Republic of Germany
- Lithuania:
  - Grand Cross of the Order of Vytautas the Great
- Norway:
  - Grand Cross of the Order of St. Olav
- Slovenia:
  - Recipient of the Order for Exceptional Merits
- Sweden:
  - Knight of the Royal Order of the Seraphim
  - Recipient of the Ruby Jubilee Commemorative Medal of King Carl XVI Gustaf

== Climate dialogue ==
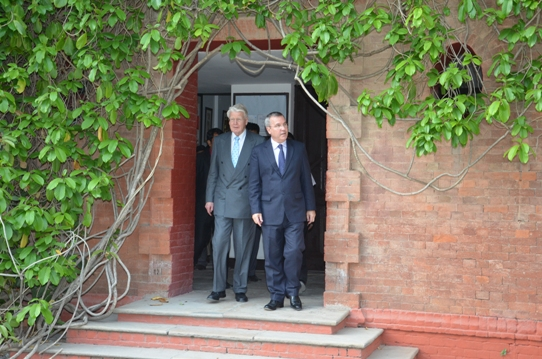
Ólafur Ragnar Grímsson during his visit to The Doon School in India, seen here with the school's headmaster Peter McLaughlin

In recent years the President has been outspoken on the issues of renewable energy and global climate change. He initiated a Global Roundtable on Climate Change with the participation of a large group of companies and individual opinion leaders. Ólafur strongly advocates the use of geothermal energy, which is renewable, economically viable and reliable resource, as proven convincingly by the case of Iceland.

In relation to his efforts on these issues, Ólafur has participated in the Global Creative Leadership Summit, organized by the Louise Blouin Foundation, in 2007 and 2008. He was also awarded the Louise T Blouin Award for Creative and Cultural Achievement. In 2008, as a delegate at the Summit he delivered the Keynote Speech on Climate Change versus Globalization.

On 15 April 2013, at the National Press Club in Washington, he announced the formation of the Arctic Circle, an organization to facilitate dialogue among political and business leaders, environmental experts, scientists, indigenous representatives, and other international stakeholders to address issues facing the Arctic as a result of climate change and melting sea ice.

== Family ==
He married Guðrún Katrín Þorbergsdóttir in 1974, who gave birth to twin daughters the following year, Guðrún Tinna, a graduate in business studies, and Svanhildur Dalla, a graduate both in political science and law. Guðrún Katrín was a popular figure in Iceland, and was mourned nationwide when she died of leukaemia in 1998.

Ólafur's second marriage was to Israeli-born Dorrit Moussaieff, to whom he became engaged in May 2000. The wedding took place on his 60th birthday, 14 May 2003, in a private ceremony held at the presidential residence.

== Health ==
Ólafur was hospitalized in Reykjavík on 6 October 2008, for an angioplasty procedure. This was announced on 9 October, with his saying that he was "recovering and has resumed most activities".

Political offices
Preceded by Jón Baldvin Hannibalsson	Minister of Finance; 1988–1991	Succeeded by Friðrik Klemenz Sophusson
Preceded by Vigdís Finnbogadóttir	President of Iceland; 1996–2016	Succeeded by Guðni Th. Jóhannesson
Party political offices
Preceded by Svavar Gestsson	Leader of the People's Alliance; 1987–1995	Succeeded by Margrét Frímannsdóttir
