= 1937 in Iceland =

- Decades: 1910s; 1920s; 1930s; 1940s; 1950s
- See also: Other events in 1937 · Timeline of Icelandic history

The following lists events that happened in 1937 in Iceland.

== Incumbents ==
- Monarch - Kristján X
- Prime Minister – Hermann Jónasson

== Events ==
- In 1937, the National Theatre of Iceland was established.

== Births ==
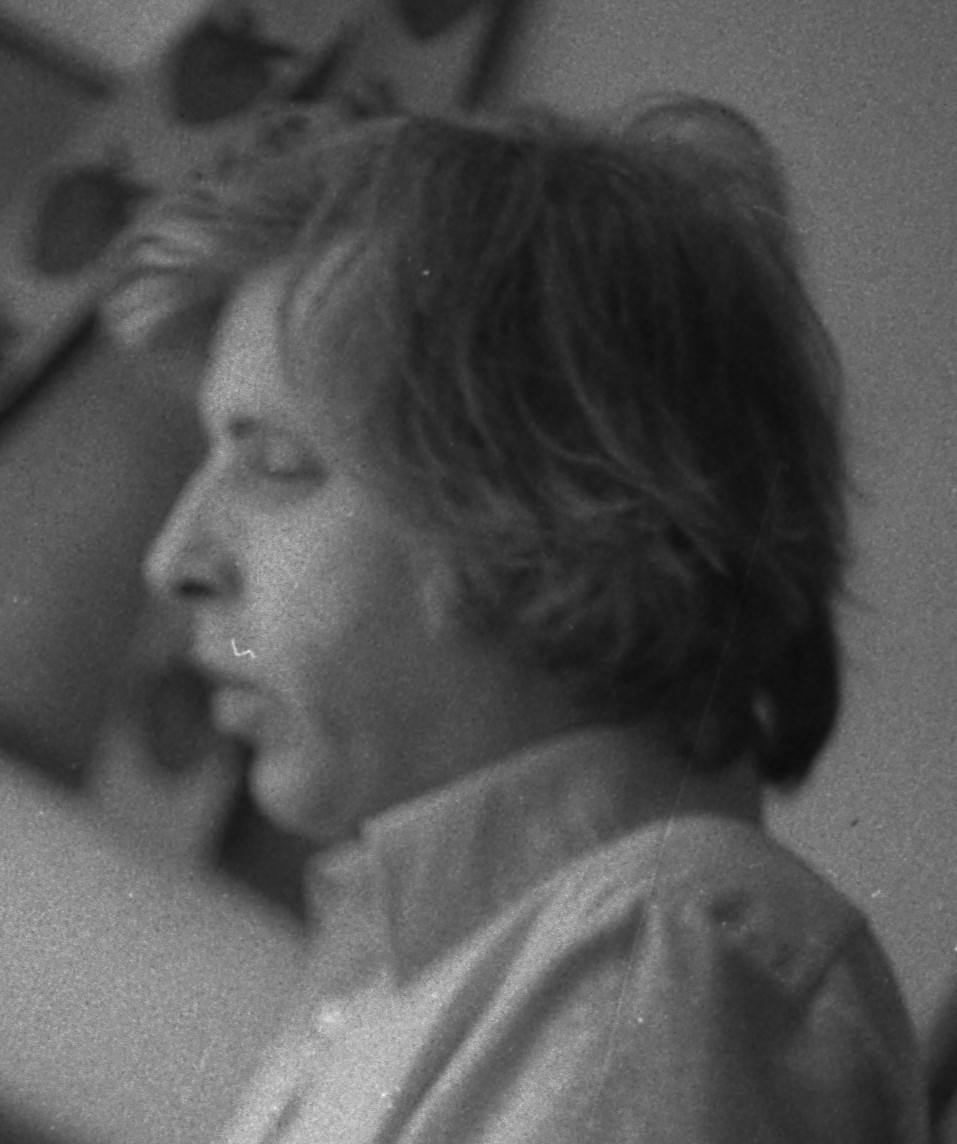
Birgir Sigurðsson

- 8 February – Skúli Níelsen, footballer
- 17 March – Páll Bragi Pétursson, politician. (d. 2020)
- 22 March – Edvard Júlíus Sólnes, politician.
- 14 April – Jón Stefánsson, footballer (d. 1964)
- 20 April – Jakob Jakobsson, footballer
- 13 June – Heimir Guðjónsson, footballer
- 19 June – Björn S. Stefánsson, social scientist
- 28 August – Birgir Sigurðsson, writer (d. 2019)
- 1 September – Sveinn Jónsson, footballer

== Deaths ==
- 28 November – Magnús Guðmundsson, politician (b. 1879).
