= 1932 in Iceland =

- Decades: 1910s; 1920s; 1930s; 1940s; 1950s
- See also: Other events in 1932 · Timeline of Icelandic history

The following lists events that happened in 1932 in Iceland.

== Incumbents ==
- Monarch - Kristján X
- Prime Minister – Tryggvi Þórhallsson, Ásgeir Ásgeirsson

== Events ==
The year 1932 in Iceland was marked by continued economic difficulties during the global Great Depression, which significantly affected the country’s fishing and agricultural sectors. Political debate intensified over economic reforms, unemployment relief, and Iceland’s relationship with Denmark under the Act of Union. Scientific exploration also gained attention through the Cambridge University Iceland Expedition, which conducted geological and natural studies across the island and contributed to international research on Icelandic landscapes and environment.

== Births ==
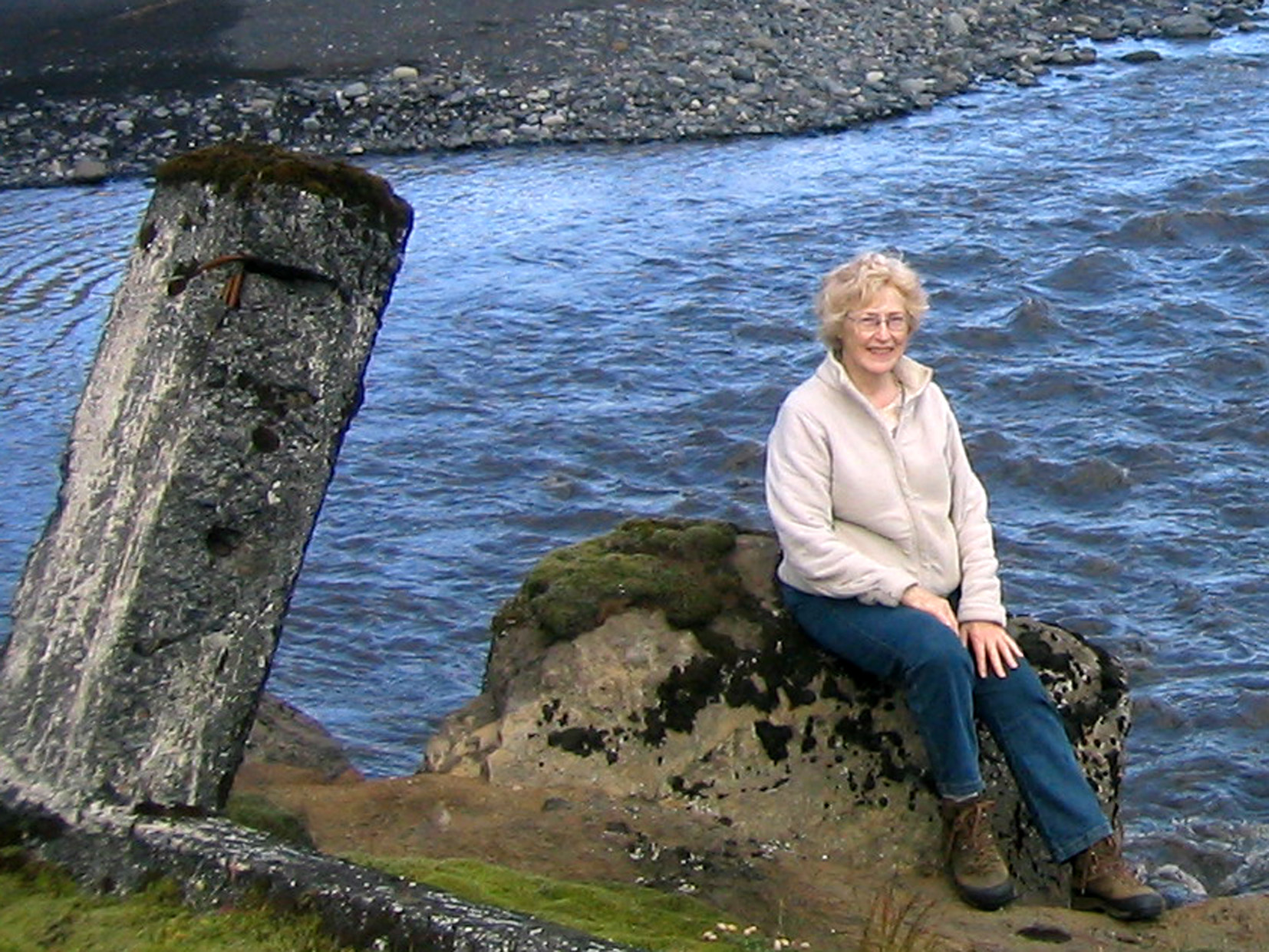
Elsa G. Vilmundardóttir

- 30 January – Dagbjartur Grímsson, footballer (d. 1986)
- 7 July – Ólafur Garðar Einarsson, politician (d. 2023)
- 16 October – Guðbergur Bergsson, writer (d. 2023)
- 27 November – Elsa G. Vilmundardóttir, geologist (d. 2008)
- 21 December – Hringur Jóhannesson, painter (d. 1996)
