= 1929 in Iceland =

- Decades: 1900s; 1910s; 1920s; 1930s; 1940s
- See also: Other events in 1929 · Timeline of Icelandic history

The following lists events that happened in 1929 in Iceland.

== Incumbents ==
- Monarch - Kristján X
- Prime Minister – Tryggvi Þórhallsson

== Events ==
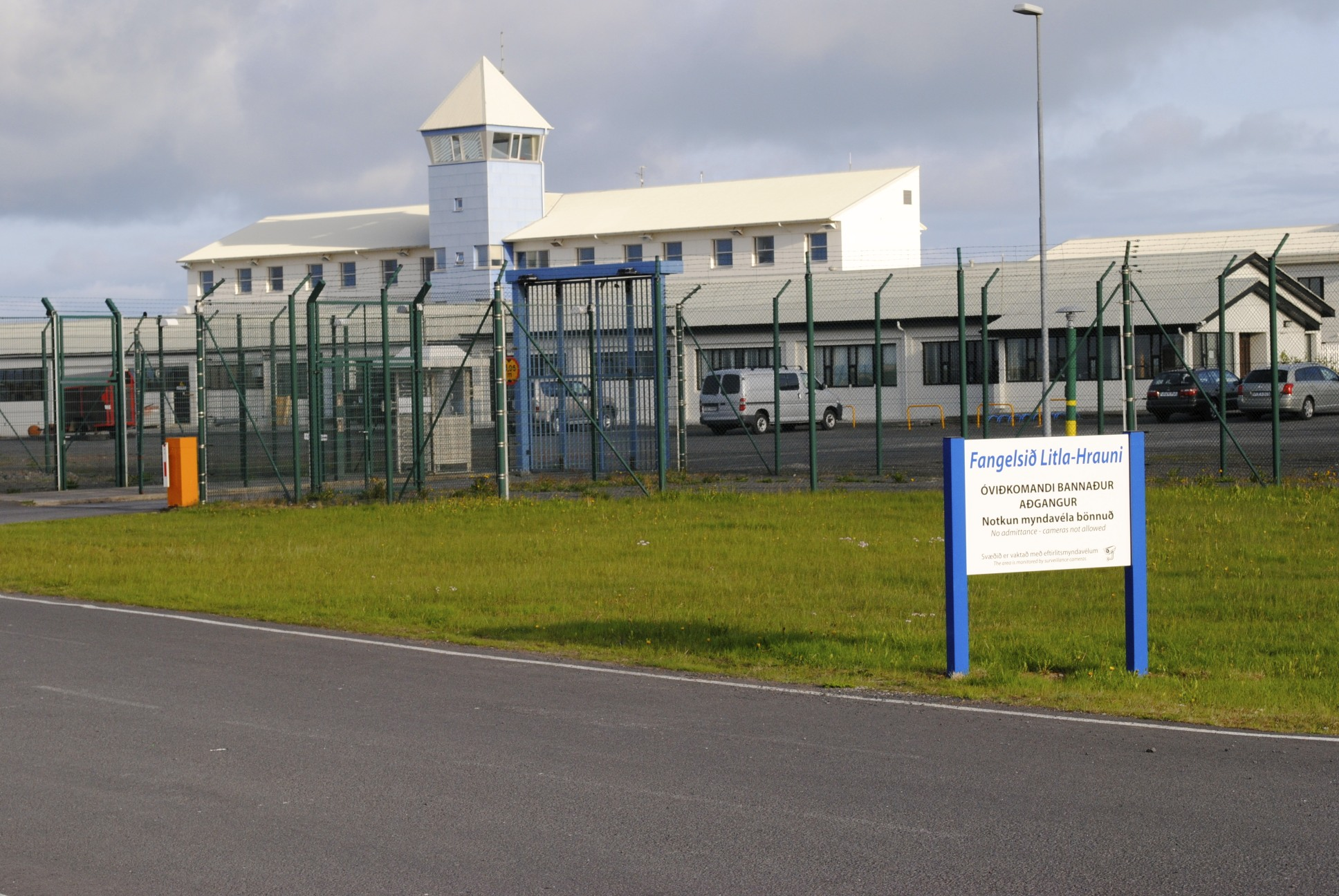
Litla-Hraun prison

- 8 March – Litla-Hraun prison established
- 25 May – The Conservative Party merged with the Liberal Party to form the Independence Party
- 1929 Úrvalsdeild
- The newspaper Ísafold merged with Morgunblaðið

== Births ==
- 30 June – Atli Steinarsson, swimmer (d. 2017)
- 6 July – Högna Sigurðardóttir, architect (d. 2017)
- 12 October – Magnus Magnusson, journalist, translator, writer and television presenter (d. 2007)
- 11 November – Pálmi Jónsson, politician. (d. 2017)
- 12 November – Ríkharður Jónsson, footballer (d. 2017)

== Deaths ==
- 12 November – Bogi Thorarensen Melsteð, historian and politician (b. 1860).
