= Vehicle registration plates of Iceland =

Iceland
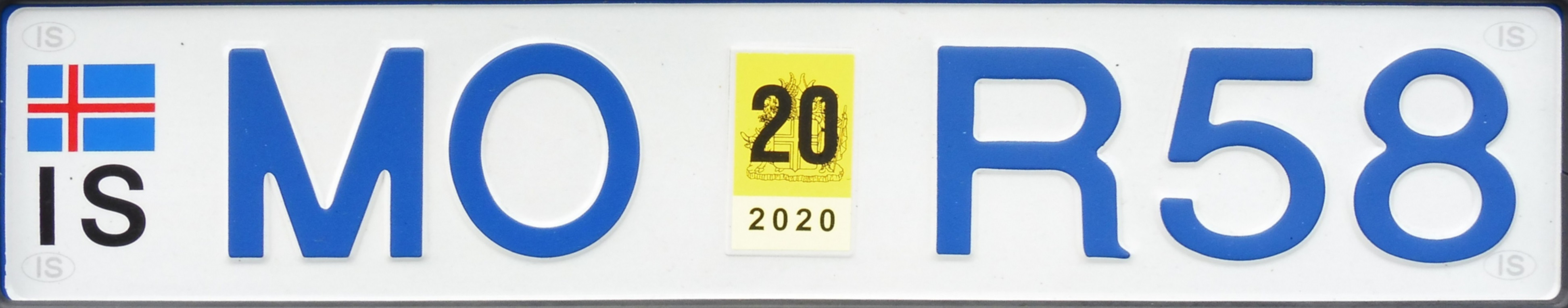
- Current regular legal (Euro-+sized) standard number plate from Iceland
- Country: Iceland
- Country code: IS

Current series
- Size: 520 mm × 110 mm 20.5 in × 4.3 in
- Serial format: Not standard
- Colour (front): Blue on White
- Colour (rear): Blue on White

In Iceland, vehicle registration plates are issued by the Icelandic Transport Authority. The plates are made of aluminium with reflective base and embossed characters. There are eleven different styles corresponding to the vehicle's type and tax status. Icelandic registration plates follow the EU standard for registration plates, with the Icelandic emblem with the letters IS on the left side with a standard (EU) size of 520 x 110mm.

New registered plates use three letters and two digits (e.g. ABC12) in Helvetica Neue. Prior to 2007, the format AB 123 was used (and is still valid), however no new plates are issued in this format. The plates are issued randomly, they are not issued sequentially and they do not have any geographic coding. Vehicles keep the same registration number for life. If a vehicle is, e.g., changed to commercial vehicle it gets commercial plates but they have the same registration number. All plates have validation stickers in the middle that indicate the year the vehicle is due for safety inspection. Last two digits of the year number are shown in white or black on the sticker. The colour of the stickers is different depending on the year. Location of the sticker is different in case it is a vanity plate.

All registration plates in Iceland are produced at the Litla-Hraun state prison by inmates.

The plates are available in 3 sizes for cars:

- European standard 520 mm × 110 mm (20.5 in × 4.3 in)
- North American standard 305 mm × 155 mm (12.0 in × 6.1 in)
- European square 280 mm × 200 mm (11.0 in × 7.9 in).

Motorcycle plates are 240 mm × 130 mm (9.4 in × 5.1 in).

== History ==
An older decentralized district plate system was used 1938 until 31 December 1988 (see below). The current registration system was introduced on 1 January 1989. Antique cars were allowed to keep their district system plates, and antique cars today may emulate the previous district system using vanity plates.

From 1989 to 2007 the system consisted of two letters and three digits. In 2007 the system ran out of combinations and the first digit was changed to a letter on newer vehicles.

Early 2004 a country identifier (IS) and the Icelandic flag was added on the left side of all standard plates. The country identifier is mandatory and all plates issued between 1989 and 2004 are required to get a national identifier sticker so they look like the new plates, although this law is not widely enforced.

In 2019, a registration was no longer needed for mopeds and quadricycles with a top speed under 25 km/h, easing the import and use of electric scooters, which were previously classified under this category.

== Type of plates ==
The colour of the license plate varies depending on the purpose of the vehicle (see chart below.)

Image	Type	Serial format	Design	Notes
	Standard	AB 123 or AB C12	Reflective white background, blue frame, and blue characters.	Current system since 1 January 1989 (with minor changes as described above)
	Commercial (VAT-Free)	AB 123 or AB C12	Reflective white background, red frame, red characters with diamond.	Vehicles with commercial plates cannot be used for private purposes, denoted by a diamond in front of number. VAT deductible if vehicle meets certain requirements.
	Off-highway	AB 123 or AB C12	Reflective white background, green frame, green characters with diamond.	Vehicles built specifically for off-highway use. E.g. rally vehicles, tracked vehicles, mining vehicles.
	Diplomatic	CD A12	Reflective green background, white frame, and white characters	Diplomatic vehicles, owned by embassies. The first two characters are always "CD" the third character indicates the nationality of the embassy.
	“Oil”	AB 123 or AB C12	Reflective dark yellow background, black frame, and black characters.	Vehicles with "oil" plates are allowed to use tax free Diesel oil. Those plates are issued to vehicles that burn fuel in a stationary position (e.g., fire trucks, rescue teams, construction vehicles.
	Temporary	RN 123	Reflective red background, black frame, and black characters	Mainly used by dealers. This type of plates always starts with RN, the sticker indicates the validation year of the plate.
	Special	AB C12	Reflective white base, green frame and green characters. A lifted rectangle is for the inspection label.	A vehicle or trailer that is almost exclusively used off-road, for specialised use or exceeds normal weight/size limits.
	Tractor	AB 123 or AB C12	Reflective white background, blue frame, and blue characters. No inspection sticker.	Not subject to inspection by the Icelandic Transport Authority.
	Off-road	AB 123 or AB C12	Reflective red base, white frame and white characters. No inspection sticker (picture is outdated).	For use on off-road vehicles. e.g. ATVs. Not subject to inspection.
	Moped/Quadricycle	AB C12	Blue reflective base, white frame and white characters.	Used for mopeds and quadricycles with a top speed of 25–45 km/h.
	Customs	12 1234 12	Four white numbers on a black background with two letters in a vertical red line on each side.	For temporary import. The number for the month on the left side and the year on the right side, indicating the duration of the registration.
	Former version, issued before 1 January 1989	A12345	Black background, silver frame and silver characters	Those plates had district codes and were issued sequentially, e.g., R stands for Reykjavík, and this is plate number 29040 issued in that district. The plates followed the owner, and he could re-use them, e.g., when he bought a new or used vehicle. If he moved to another district, the plates had to be replaced. From 1 January 1989, all further use of those plates was forbidden (except for vehicles that already had them on).
	Vanity	123ABC	Reflective white background, blue frame, and blue characters	The sticker for vehicle inspection is on the left instead of a country identifier. 2-6 characters of the Icelandic alphabet as well as numbers. Must not follow the standard format (AB123 or ABC12).
	President	1	Seal of the Icelandic President on left and number '1' on right.	Number 1 is the president's vehicle

== Diplomatic Plates ==
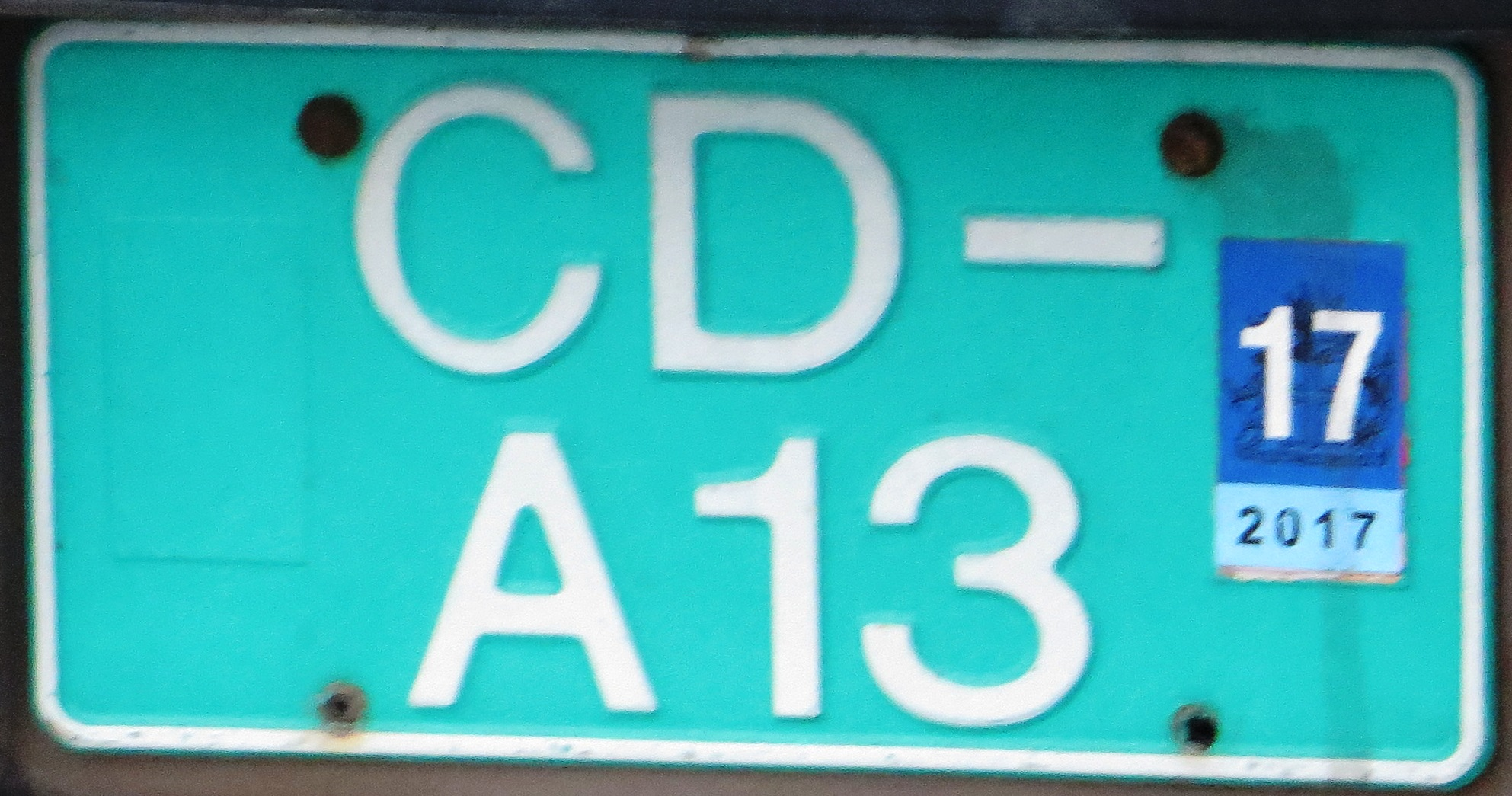
Diplomatic plate for U.S. diplomats as indicated by the third letter 'A' .

Diplomatic plates have a reflective green background, white frame, and white characters. They are used by foreign embassies, ambassadors and diplomatic staff. They always begin with 'CD' for 'Corps Diplomatique' and the third letter indicates the country of which it is associated (see table below). The last two numbers are issued sequentially for the respective country. Diplomatic plates do not bear the Icelandic emblem.

Letter	Country
A	United States
B	United Kingdom
C	Denmark
D	Finland
E	France
F	India
G	China
H	Norway
I	Poland
J	Russia
K	Sweden
L	Czech Republic
M	Canada
N	Germany
O	International Monetary Fund
P	Japan
R	European Union
S	North Atlantic Treaty Organisation
T	Spain

== Safety inspection ==
The law requires owners to keep their motor vehicle in safe operating condition. All vehicles registered in Iceland are required to pass a periodic safety inspection.

The frequency of inspection depends on the age of the car. A new car is due for its first safety inspection after 4 years, then again after 2 years until it reaches 8 years old from when an inspection is required every year (4-2-2-1). A sticker to indicate the year is usually placed in the middle after the first two letters. Antique cars (over 25 years old) that are registered as antique vehicles require an inspection every second year, based on the year of first registration (a car initially registered in an odd year will require and inspection every odd year and a car first registered in an even year every even year.)

The last digit on the plate indicates the month for inspection (e.g., 1 for January through 0 for October). As the plates are issued randomly some cars are due for their first inspection after 4 years and 10 months and other cars after only 3 years and 1 month. While this system means no cars are listed as being due in November and December there is a 2-month grace period where a vehicle can be inspected up to 2 months after the due date without penalty i.e. a car with a license plate ending in 0 can be inspected as late as December without penalty. Vehicles are also allowed to be inspected up to 6 months before they are due although it is not possible to do so if it is still the previous year i.e. a car with a license plate ending in 8 can be inspected as early as February whereas a car with a license plate ending in 2 can only be inspected as early as January.

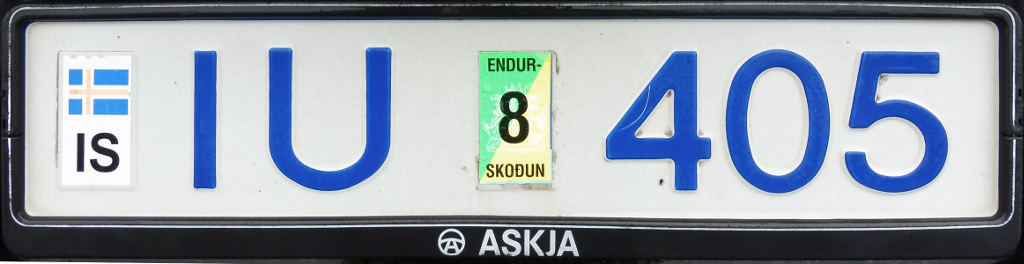
Sticker indicating the need for a re-inspection

There are 4 possible outcomes for an inspection. The car may pass "without notes" which means that there was nothing found during the inspection at all. A car may pass but with notices which means that components are either worn or inoperative but either they are still serviceable or that particular component cannot fail a vehicle in inspection. If a vehicle fails a safety inspection but the car is still deemed safe to drive a sticker is placed over the current inspection sticker, green in even years and half green, half orange in odd years, indicating that the vehicle has failed inspection and the month that the re-inspection is due. The owner has until the end of the following month to repair any items that failed inspection and present the vehicle for a re-inspection. If a fault is found that deems the vehicle unsafe to drive or there is other illegal issues (e.g. error in the registration, illegal lighting etc.) the car will fail inspection and will be given a red sticker that says "Akstur bönnuð" which means driving prohibited and the vehicle must not be driven on public roads until the issues have been rectified.

== Old district plates ==
This system was used from 1938 until 31 December 1988 and consisted of a black plate with silver letters. The first letter denominated the district (except for military related) where the plate was issued as follows:

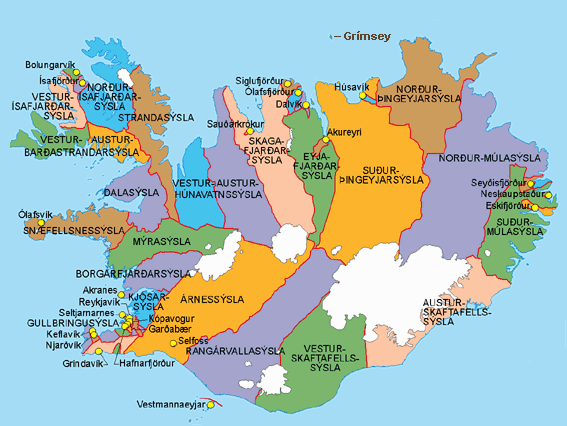
Districts of Iceland

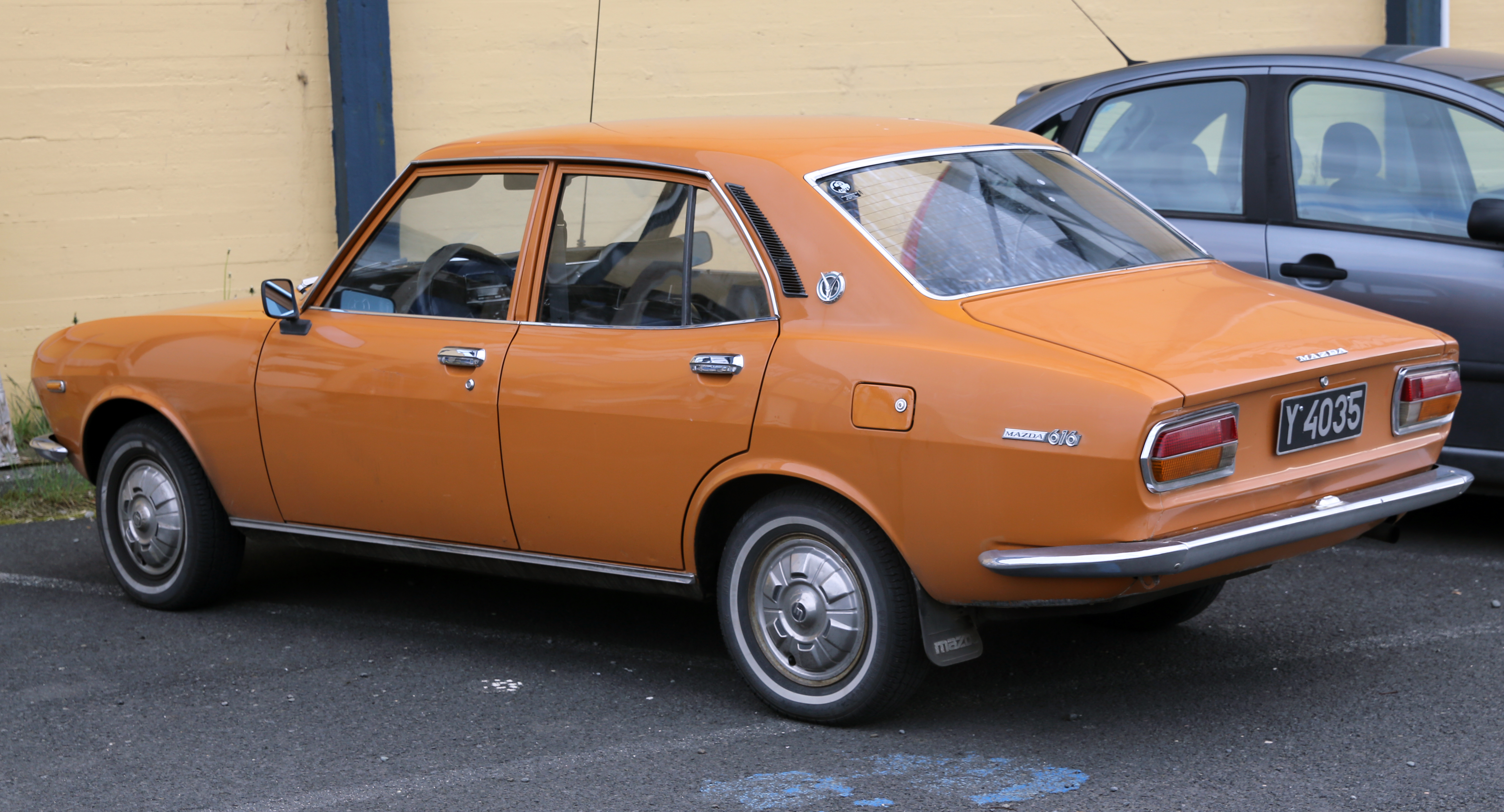
1973 Mazda 616 featuring the old registration system. The Y means that the car is registered in Kópavogur

- A: Akureyrarkaupstaður og Eyjafjarðarsýsla
- B: Barðastrandarsýsla
- D: Dalasýsla
- E: Akraneskaupstaður
- F: Siglufjarðarkaupstaður
- G: Hafnarfjarðarkaupstaður og Gullbringu- og Kjósarsýsla
- H: Húnavatnssýsla
- Í: Ísafjarðarkaupstaður og Ísafjarðarsýsla
- J: Íslenskir starfsmenn á Keflavíkurflugvelli e. Icelandic employees at Keflavík airport (then US military airport)
- JO: Erlendir starfsmenn á Keflavíkurflugvelli e. Foreign employees at Keflavík airport
- K: Sauðárkrókskaupstaður og Skagafjarðarsýsla
- L: Rangárvallasýsla
- M: Mýra- og Borgarfjarðarsýsla
- N: Neskaupstaður
- Ó: Ólafsfjarðarkaupstaður
- P: Snæfells- og Hnappadalssýsla
- R: Reykjavík
- S: Seyðisfjarðarkaupstaður og Norður-Múlasýsla
- T: Strandasýsla
- U: Suður-Múlasýsla
- V: Vestmannaeyjakaupstaður
- VL: Varnarliðið e. [US] defence force [in Iceland (now defunct)]
- VLE: Ökutæki hermanna e. [US] soldier vehicle [in Iceland (now defunct)]
- X: Árnessýsla
- Y: Kópavogur
- Z: Skaftafellssýsla
- Þ: Þingeyjarsýsla
- Ö: Keflavíkurkaupstaður
- Ø: Keflavík (It is the only code that uses a letter not in the Icelandic alphabet.)

After the change to the new registration system in 1989, plates were permitted to have a sticker displaying the district's emblem (where the current international Icelandic 'IS' emblem is currently).

== See also ==
- Driving licence in Iceland
- Road signs in Iceland
- Vehicle registration plate
- Vehicle registration plates of Europe
