= 1928 in Iceland =

- Decades: 1900s; 1910s; 1920s; 1930s; 1940s
- See also: Other events in 1928 · Timeline of Icelandic history

The following lists events that happened in 1928 in Iceland.

== Incumbents ==
- Monarch – Kristján X
- Prime Minister – Tryggvi Þórhallsson

== Events ==
- Scheduled air travel to Akureyri Airport started
- 1928 Úrvalsdeild

== Births ==
- 18 February – Tom Johnson, ice hockey player (d. 2007)
- 22 June – Steingrímur Hermannsson, politician (d. 2010)
- 22 September – Bryndís Pétursdóttir, actress (d. 2020)
- 8 November – Haukur Clausen, short-distance runner and dentist (d. 2003).
- 8 November – Örn Clausen, athlete (d. 2008).

=== Full date missing ===
- Gerður Helgadóttir, sculptor and stained glass artist (d.1975)
