= 1938 in Iceland =

- Decades: 1910s; 1920s; 1930s; 1940s; 1950s
- See also: Other events in 1938 · Timeline of Icelandic history

The following lists events that happened in 1938 in Iceland.

== Holiday Creations ==
- 2 June – Fisherman's Day, created.

== Incumbents ==
- Monarch - Kristján X
- Prime Minister – Hermann Jónasson

== Births ==
- 6 January – Garðar Árnason, footballer
- 15 March – Þorsteinn frá Hamri, writer (d. 2018)
- 18 March – Álfrún Gunnlaugsdóttir, writer
- 23 June – Hjalti Einarsson, handball player.
- 27 June – Björgvin Hermannsson, footballer (d. 2012)
- 24 August – Halldór Blöndal, politician.
- 21 September – Atli Heimir Sveinsson, composer (d. 2019)

== Deaths ==
- 21 May – Einar Hjörleifsson Kvaran, editor, novelist, poet and playwright (b. 1859)
- 20 August – Guðrún Lárusdóttir, politician, writer and translator (b. 1880)
