= 1934 in Iceland =

- Decades: 1910s; 1920s; 1930s; 1940s; 1950s
- See also: Other events in 1934 · Timeline of Icelandic history

The following lists events that happened in 1934 in Iceland.

== Incumbents ==
- Monarch - Kristján X
- Prime Minister – Ásgeir Ásgeirsson (until 28 July), Hermann Jónasson (since 28 July)

== Events ==
1934 Icelandic parliamentary election

== Births ==
- 27 February – Reynir Karlsson, footballer (d. 2014)
- 24 March – Arnór Hannibalsson, philosopher and historian (d. 2012)
- 22 April – Peter Ronson, athlete (d. 2007)
- 5 June – Vilhjálmur Einarsson, athlete, Iceland's first ever Olympic medalist (d. 2019)
- 9 June – Valbjörn Þorláksson, track and field athlete (d. 2009).
- 12 July – Kristinn Gunnlaugsson, footballer (d. 2001)
- 14 August – Guðrún Katrín Þorbergsdóttir, First Lady of Iceland (d. 1998)
- 23 August – Helgi Björgvinsson, footballer
- 15 September – Bjarni Jónsson, painter (d. 2008)
- 18 September – Sveinn Einarsson, theatre director

== Deaths ==
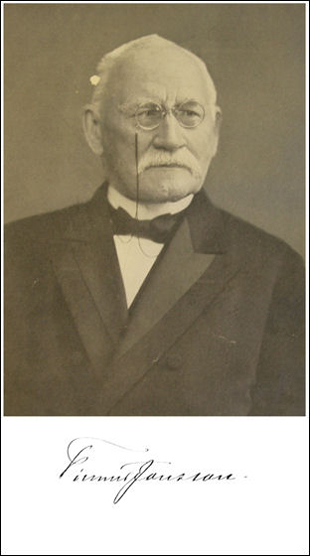
Finnur Jónsson

- 30 March – Finnur Jónsson, philologist (b. 1858)
