= 1933 in Iceland =

- Decades: 1910s; 1920s; 1930s; 1940s; 1950s
- See also: Other events in 1933 · Timeline of Icelandic history

The following lists events that happened in 1933 in Iceland.

== Incumbents ==
- Monarch – Kristján X
- Prime Minister – Ásgeir Ásgeirsson

== Events ==
- 16 July – Icelandic parliamentary election, 1933
- 21 October – Icelandic prohibition referendum, 1933
- 1933 Úrvalsdeild

== Births ==
- 16 April – Helgi Daníelsson, footballer (d. 2014)
- 30 April – Þorgeir Þorgeirson, writer and film director (d. 2003).
- 14 June – Gunnar Gunnarsson, footballer
- 3 October – Halldór Sigurbjörnsson, footballer (d. 1983)

== Deaths ==
- 7 March – Stefán Sigurðsson, poet (b. 1887)
