= Road signs in Jamaica =

Road signs in Jamaica are standardized by the Traffic Control Devices Manual developed by the Ministry of Transport and Mining (formerly the Ministry of Transport and Works). They generally follow both US signs based on the MUTCD, including diamond-shaped warning signs, and European signs based on the Vienna Convention on Road Signs and Signals. The pictograms resemble those used on Swedish signs prior to 2007. Jamaica drives on the left.

== History ==
In 1928, it was reported that the Jamaica Automobile Association (JAA) had obtained permission to erect road signs on a trial basis "of such make and construction as to be easily discernible at night." They were described as consisting of red triangles, and being of the same design as those in use in Britain. In 1930, the JAA was receiving assistance from the Public Works Department (PWD) in erecting bullseye-style road signs with the names of towns at their entrance.

== Regulatory signs ==
Regulatory signs are used to inform motorists of various restrictions. Unless indicated otherwise on an additional panel, the restriction applies from the point at which the sign is erected.

=== Priority signs ===
R1
Give way (without inscription)

R1-1
Give way (with inscription)

R2
Stop sign

=== Prohibitory signs ===
R7
Road closed to all vehicles

R8
No entry

R9
No motor vehicles

R10
No motor vehicles (except for motorcycles without sidecars)

R11
No motorcycles

R12
No pedal cycles

R13
No mopeds

R14
No goods vehicles

R15
No vehicles pulling a trailer (except for semi-trailers or single-axle trailers)

R16
No vehicles pulling a trailer

R17
No pedestrians

R18
No animal-drawn vehicles

R19
No handcarts

R20
No agricultural vehicles

R21
No vehicles exceeding 2.2 metres in width

R22
No vehicles exceeding 3.5 metres in height

R23
No vehicles exceeding 12 tonnes

R24
No vehicles exceeding 6 tonnes per axle

R25
No vehicles exceeding 12 metres in length

R26
No right turn

R27
No left turn

R28
No U-turn

R29
No overtaking

R30
No overtaking by goods vehicles

R31
End of the overtaking prohibition

R32
End of the overtaking prohibition for goods vehicles

R33
Speed limit (20 km/h)

R33
Speed limit (30 km/h)

R33
Speed limit (40 km/h)

R33
Speed limit (50 km/h)

R33
Speed limit (60 km/h)

R33
Speed limit (70 km/h)

R33
Speed limit (80 km/h)

R33
Speed limit (90 km/h)

R33
Speed limit (100 km/h)

R33
Speed limit (110 km/h)

R34-1
Use of audible warning devices prohibited

R34-2
Silence zone

U1-2
One-way road (left)

U1-1
One-way road (right)

=== Mandatory signs ===
R35-1
Turn right

R35-2
Turn left

R35-3
Proceed straight ahead

R35-4
Turn right ahead

R35-5
Turn left ahead

R35-6
Proceed straight or turn right ahead

R35-7
Proceed straight or turn left ahead

R35-8
Turn left or right ahead

R36-1
Keep left

R36-2
Keep right

R36-3
Pass on either side

R37
Roundabout

R38
Cycle path

R39
Footpath

R40
Bridlepath

=== Parking and stopping signs ===
R41
No parking

R42
No stopping

== Warning signs ==
Warning signs are used to indicate the presence of road hazards that are difficult for a driver proceeding at a normal pace to perceive in time.

=== Warning of roadway conditions ===
W1-1
Bend to the right

W1-2
Bend to the left

W1-3
Double bend, or series of bends (first to the right)

W1-4
Double bend, or series of bends (first to the left)

W2-1
Steep descent

W2-2
Steep ascent

W3-1
Road narrows from both sides

W3-2
Road narrows from the right side

W3-3
Road narrows from the left side

W3-4
Narrow bridge

W3-4-1
Single lane bridge

W4
Drawbridge

W5
Unprotected quay, ferry berth, or riverbank

W6-1
Uneven road

W6-2
Hump or ramp

W6-3
Dip (including fords, cross-drains, etc.)

W6-3-1
Ford (The inscription "FORDING" is optional)

W6-3-2
Cross-drain (The inscription "CROSS-DRAIN" is optional)

W6-3-3
Ford (The supplementary plate with the inscription "FORDING" is optional)

W6-3-4
Cross-drain (The supplementary plate with the inscription "CROSS-DRAIN" is optional)

W7
Slippery road

W8
Loose chippings

W9-1
Falling rocks from the left

W9-2
Falling rocks from the right

W10
Pedestrian crossing ahead

W10F
Pedestrian crossing ahead. This fluorescent green version is unofficial.

W11
Children

W11-1
School zone

W11-2
Playground

W11-3
Sports ground

W12
Cyclists crossing

W13 Cattle

W16
Low-flying aircraft

W17-1
Strong crosswinds from the left

W17-2
Strong crosswinds from the right

W18
Two-way traffic

W19
Tunnel

W20
Railway crossing ahead

W23
Railway crossing

W28
Danger

W30-1
Dual carriageway ahead

W30-2
Dual carriageway ends ahead

W31-2
No through road ahead

=== Warning at intersections ===
W15
Traffic signals ahead

W24-1
4-leg intersection

W24-2
3-leg intersection to the left

W24-2
3-leg intersection to the right

W24-3
T-intersection

W25
Priority intersection

W26
Roundabout

W27
Stop ahead

W29
Give way ahead

=== Construction signs ===
W14
Roadworks

U6
End of roadworks

== Advisory signs ==
Advisory signs are part of the broader category of informative signs which provide information to drivers about the destinations and types of facilities along the roadway, as well as general information about how to use the road.

I15
Pedestrian crossing

U2
No through road

U2-1
No through road on the right

U2-2
No through road on the left

U3
Hospital

=== Service facility signs ===
F8
First aid station
