= 1927 in Iceland =

- Decades: 1900s; 1910s; 1920s; 1930s; 1940s
- See also: Other events in 1927 · Timeline of Icelandic history

The following lists events that happened in 1927 in Iceland.

== Incumbents ==
- Monarch - Kristján X
- Prime Minister – Jón Þorláksson, Tryggvi Þórhallsson

== Events ==
- 9 July – Icelandic parliamentary election, 1927
- 28 August – The Cabinet of Tryggvi Þórhallsson formed
- 1927 Úrvalsdeild

== Births ==
- 2 February – Gísli Halldórsson, actor (d. 1998)
- 29 March – Jón Hnefill Aðalsteinsson, scholar and folklorist (d. 2010)
- 3 July – Salome Þorkelsdóttir, politician
- 14 September – Ari Guðmundsson, ski jumper (d. 2003)
- 8 October – Ívar Stefánsson, cross country skier (d. 2009)

=== Full date missing ===
- Sigurdur Helgason, mathematician

== Deaths ==
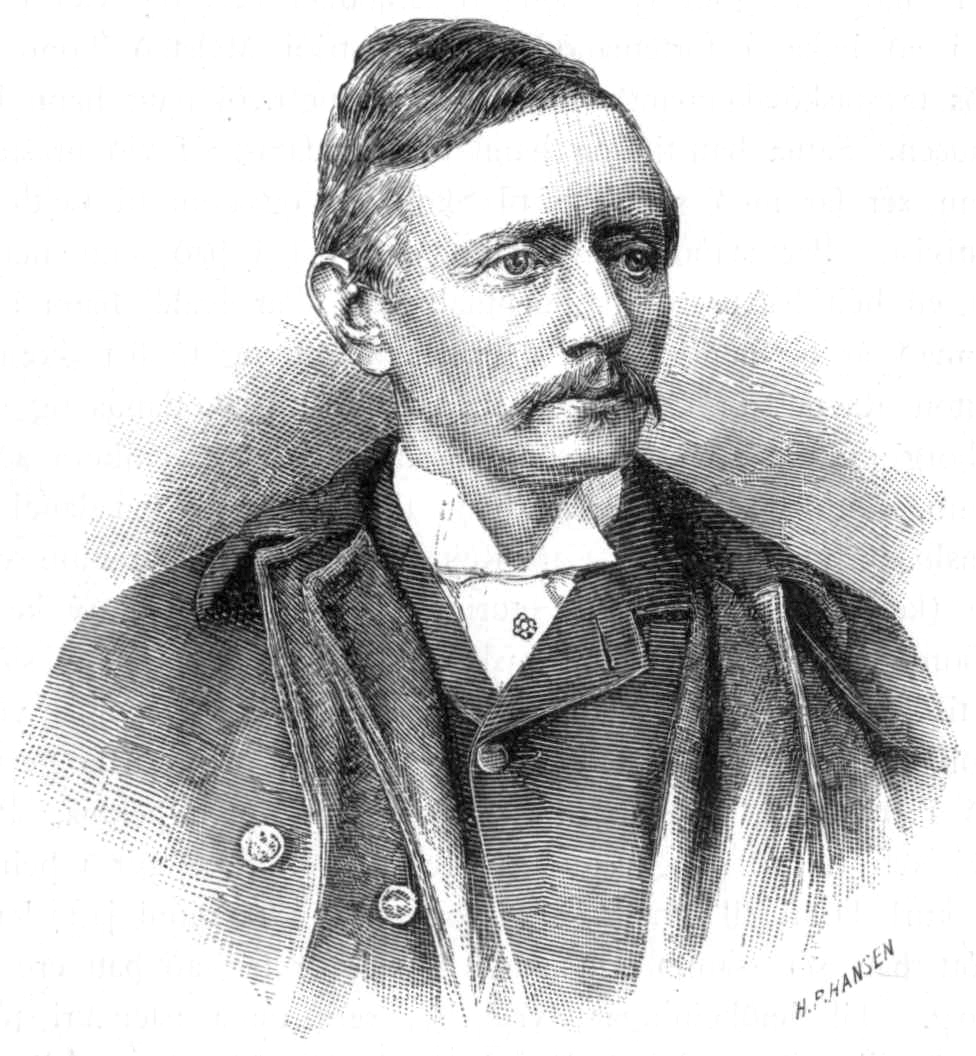
Sveinbjörn Sveinbjörnsson

- 23 February – Sveinbjörn Sveinbjörnsson, composer (b. 1847).
