= 1931 in Iceland =

- Decades: 1910s; 1920s; 1930s; 1940s; 1950s
- See also: Other events in 1931 · Timeline of Icelandic history

The following lists events that happened in 1931 in Iceland.

== Incumbents ==
- Monarch - Kristján X
- Prime Minister – Tryggvi Þórhallsson

== Events ==
=== LZ 127 Graf Zeppelin Iceland Flight ===
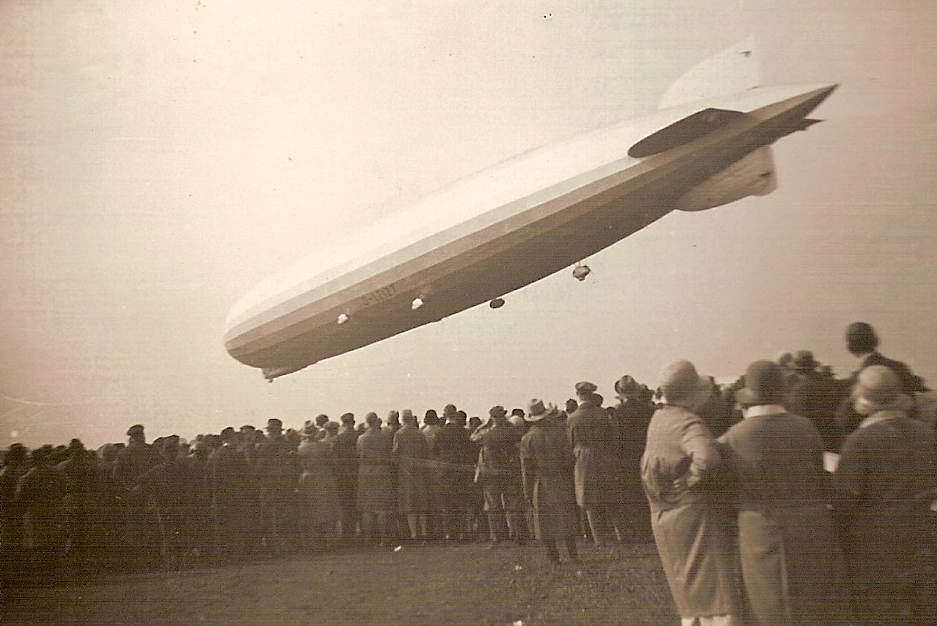
Picture of the LZ 127 Graf Zeppelin landing

LZ 127 Graf was a German rigid commercial passenger airship known for being the first airship to circumnavigate the world, and the first of any airborne vehicle to provide a transatlantic passenger service. On July 1st 1931 it visited Reykjavik and dropped off mail, having previously travelled there in 1930.

Iceland produced a series of overprinted stamp in 1931 to facilitate zeppelin mail.

=== Parliamentary elections ===
The 1931 parliamentary election took place on the 12th of june and resulted in a total of 38,544 votes. 16,891 of the votes where for the Independence party, 13,844.5 votes for the Progressive party, 6,197.5 votes for the Social Democratic party, and 1,165 for the Communist party. The Prime minister was the same and 446 votes where independent.

== Births ==
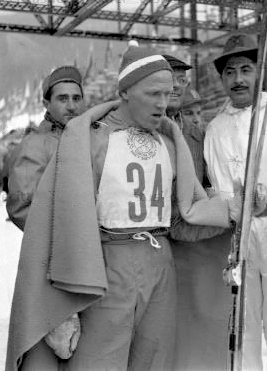
Oddur Pétursson

- 1 March – Sveinn Teitsson, footballer (d. 2017)
- 13 April – Halldór Halldórsson, footballer (d. 2003)
- 5 June – Pétur Georgsson, footballer
- 2 July – Oddur Pétursson, cross country skier. (d. 2018)
- 6 August – Matthías Árni Mathiesen, politician (d. 2011).
- 27 August – Ebenezer Thorarinsson, cross country skier (d. 2003).
- 10 September – Magnús Jónsson, footballer
- 4 October – Jón Helgason, politician. (d. 2019)
- 25 October – Hörður Felixson, footballer
- 3 November – Erlendur Haraldsson, psychologist (d. 2020)
- 14 December – Hannes Pétursson, poet

=== Full date missing ===
- Jón Gunnar Árnason, sculptor (d. 1989)
