= 1936 in Iceland =

- Decades: 1910s; 1920s; 1930s; 1940s; 1950s
- See also: Other events in 1936 · Timeline of Icelandic history

The following lists events that happened in 1936 in Iceland.

== Incumbents ==
- Monarch - Kristján X
- Prime Minister – Hermann Jónasson

== Events ==
- 11 May - The Icelandic sports club Knattspyrnufélagið Víðir is established.
- 1 June - The Icelandic sports club the UMF Selfoss is established.
- 10 August - The Icelandic Airline is founded.
- 22 October - A magnitude 5.5 earthquake strikes 103 km NNW of Siglufjörður, causing light to moderate shaking across the northern and western regions.
- 31 October - The Icelandic daily newspaper Þjóðviljinn is founded and operates until 1999 when it ends in January 1999 because of financial troubles.

== Births ==
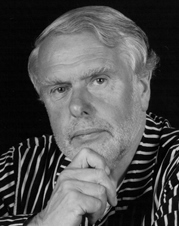
Jón Kristinsson

- 7 May – Jón Kristinsson, architect
- 16 June – Árni Njálsson, footballer
- 19 July – Birgir Ísleifur Gunnarsson, politician. (d. 2019)
- 16 September – Helgi Valdimarsson (d. 2018)
- 16 November – Ólafur Gíslason, footballer
- 26 December – Bjarni Felixson, footballer
