= 1926 in Iceland =

- Decades: 1900s; 1910s; 1920s; 1930s; 1940s
- See also: Other events in 1926 · Timeline of Icelandic history

The following lists events that happened in 1926 in Iceland.

== Incumbents ==
- Monarch - Kristján X
- Prime Minister – Jón Magnússon, Magnús Guðmundsson, Jón Þorláksson

== Events ==
- 1 July – The Icelandic Coast Guard formally founded
- 1 July – Icelandic parliamentary election, 1926
- 8 July – Cabinet of Jón Þorláksson formed
- 1926 Úrvalsdeild

== Births ==
- 28 March – Ingvar Gíslason, politician
- 18 April – Indriði G. Þorsteinsson, writer (d. 2000)
- 7 November – Ólafur Hannesson, footballer
- 11 November – Torfi Bryngeirsson, athlete (d. 1995).

== Deaths ==
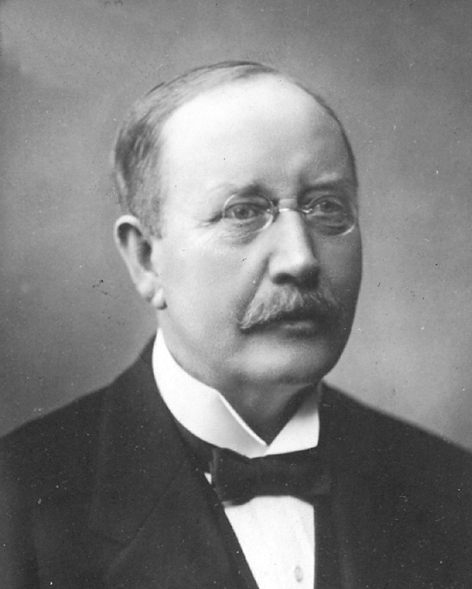
Jón Magnússon

- 23 June – Jón Magnússon, politician (b. 1859).
- 2 July – Kristján Jónsson, politician (b. 1852).
