= Vilborg Dagbjartsdóttir =

Icelandic writer, poet, and teacher (1930–2021)

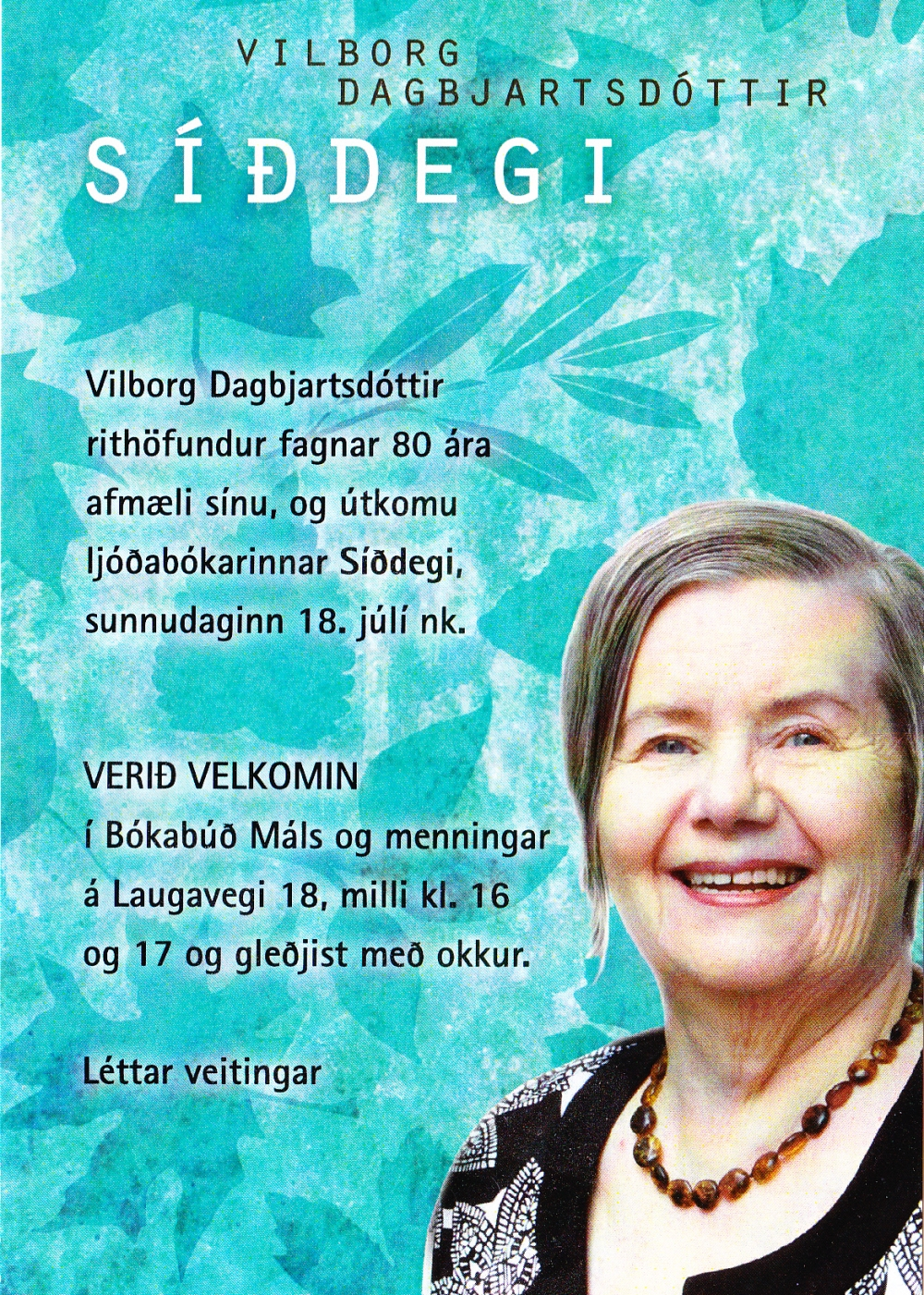
- Vilborg prior to her 80th birthday in 2010
- Born: 18 July 1930; Vestdalseyri, Seyðisfjörður, Kingdom of Iceland
- Died: 16 September 2021 (aged 91); Reykjavík, Iceland
- Occupations: Writer, poet, teacher
- Spouse: Þorgeir Þorgeirson
- Children: 2

Vilborg Dagbjartsdóttir (18 July 1930 – 16 September 2021) was an Icelandic writer, poet and teacher.

== Career ==
She published her first book of poetry in 1960 and became one of the few women in Iceland to write modernist poetry. Her third book of poems, Kyndilmessa (1971; Candlemass), has been described as a "breakthrough". Innovative features in her works include the use of colloquial language and images of daily life. Like Jón úr Vör she combined lyrical realism with romantic imagery.

Vilborg was active in the feminist movement, and her works are concerned with the status of women in society as well as social inequality in general.

She published a number of books for children, including non-fiction works and translations.

== Early and personal life ==
Vilborg was born in Vestdalseyri, Seyðisfjörður in the Eastern Region of Iceland. She studied to become a teacher, and became one in 1955. She taught at elementary school all together for 46 years.

In regard to her political views, media has written that "she converted to communism before she was eighteen and went to Reykjavik to study"; she was also described as a "socialist".

Vilborg was married to Þorgeir Þorgeirson (1933–2003), a writer and filmmaker.

Vilborg died on 16 September 2021 at the National University Hospital of Iceland.

== Works ==
Poetry

- Laufið á trjánum ('foliage on the trees'), Heimskringla 1960
- Dvergliljur ('dwarf lilies'), Helgafell 1968
- Kyndilmessa (Candlemas), Helgafell 1971
- Ljóð (heildarútgáfa) (Poems), Mál og menning 1981
- Klukkan í turninum (The Clock in the Tower), Forlagið 1992
- Ótta (ljóðaúrval), Valdimar Tómasson 1994
- Ljósar hendur (safnrit 3 skálda), Fjölvaútgáfan 1996
- Orðin vaxa í kringum mig (1989; Words Grow All Around Me)
