= 1935 in Iceland =

- Decades: 1910s; 1920s; 1930s; 1940s; 1950s
- See also: Other events in 1935 · Timeline of Icelandic history

The following lists events that happened in 1935 in Iceland.

== Incumbents ==
- Monarch - Kristján X
- Prime Minister – Hermann Jónasson

== Events ==
- January 28 – Iceland made abortions legal.

== Births ==
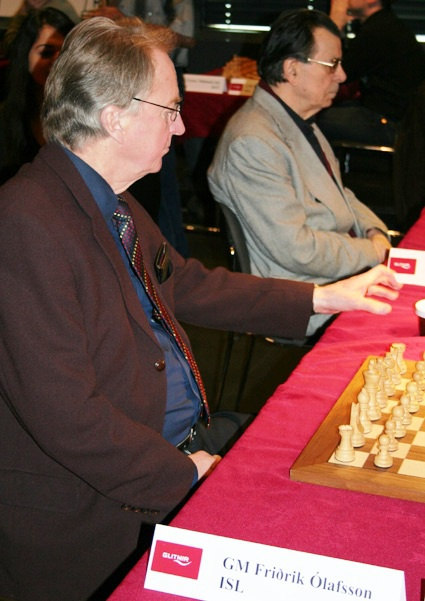
Friðrik Ólafsson

- 26 January – Friðrik Ólafsson, chess player, former president of FIDE.
- 22 August – Árni Bergmann, writer and translator
- 27 August – Óli Þorbjörn Guðbjartsson, politician.
- 7 September – Guðrún Helgadóttir, children's writer and politician.
- 24 September – Björn Helgason, footballer.
- 31 October – Hjörleifur Guttormsson, politician.
- 13 December – Eyvindur P. Eiríksson, writer

== Deaths ==
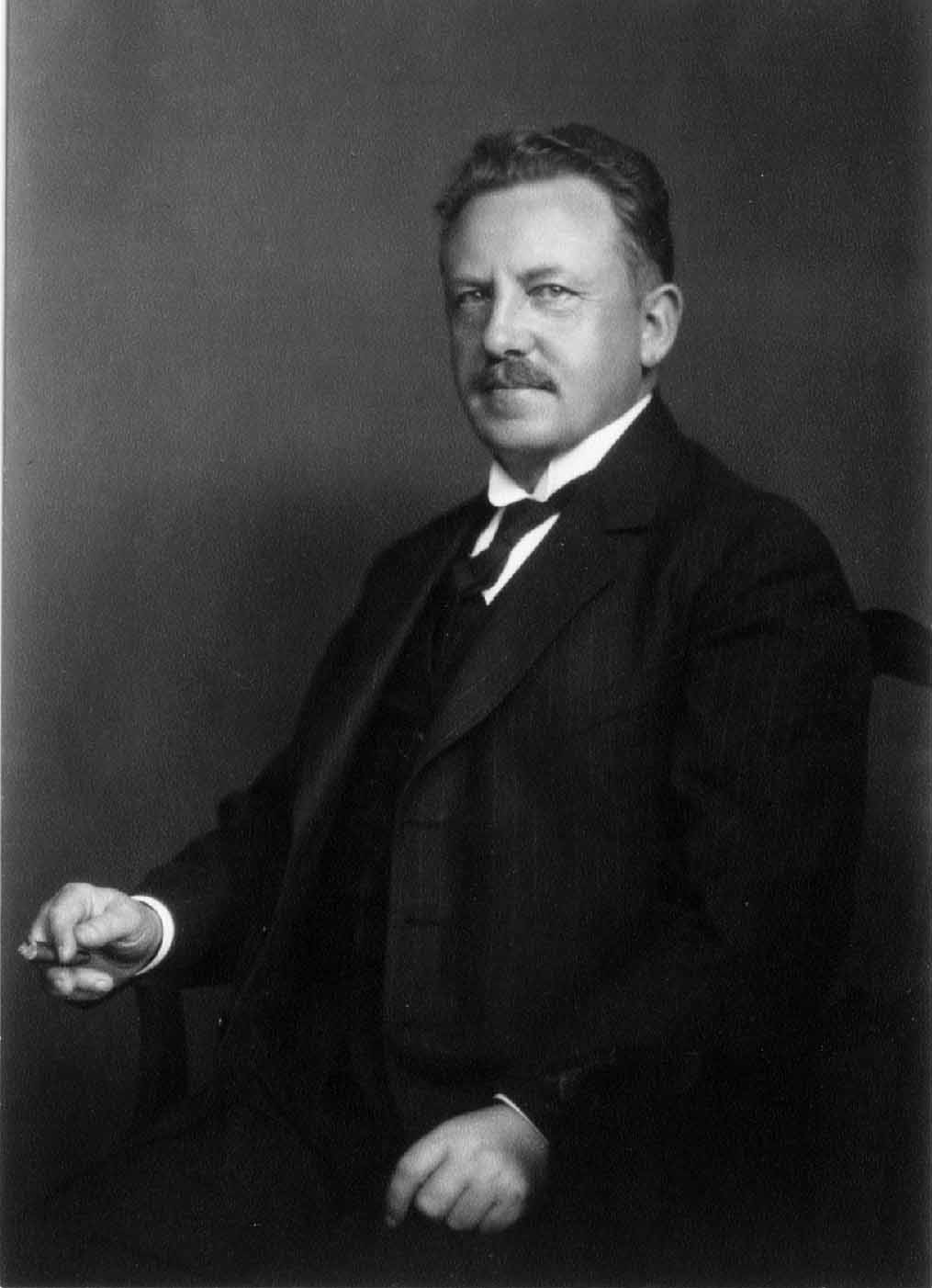
Jón Þorláksson

- 20 March – Jón Þorláksson, Prime Minister of Iceland 1926–1927 (b. 1877).
- 31 July – Tryggvi Þórhallsson, politician (b. 1889).
