= 1930 in Iceland =

- Decades: 1910s; 1920s; 1930s; 1940s; 1950s
- See also: Other events in 1930 · Timeline of Icelandic history

The following lists events that happened in 1930 in Iceland.

== Incumbents ==
- Monarch - Kristján X
- Prime Minister – Tryggvi Þórhallsson

== Events ==
=== January - June ===
- June 15
  - Iceland held a parliamentary election to elect members to the Althing (Alþingi), Iceland's parliament.

=== July - December ===
- August
  - The 1000th anniversary of the founding of the Icelandic parliament.
- November
  - The Communist Party of Iceland is founded.
- December
  - The Icelandic State Radio named RUV begins broadcasting.

== Births ==
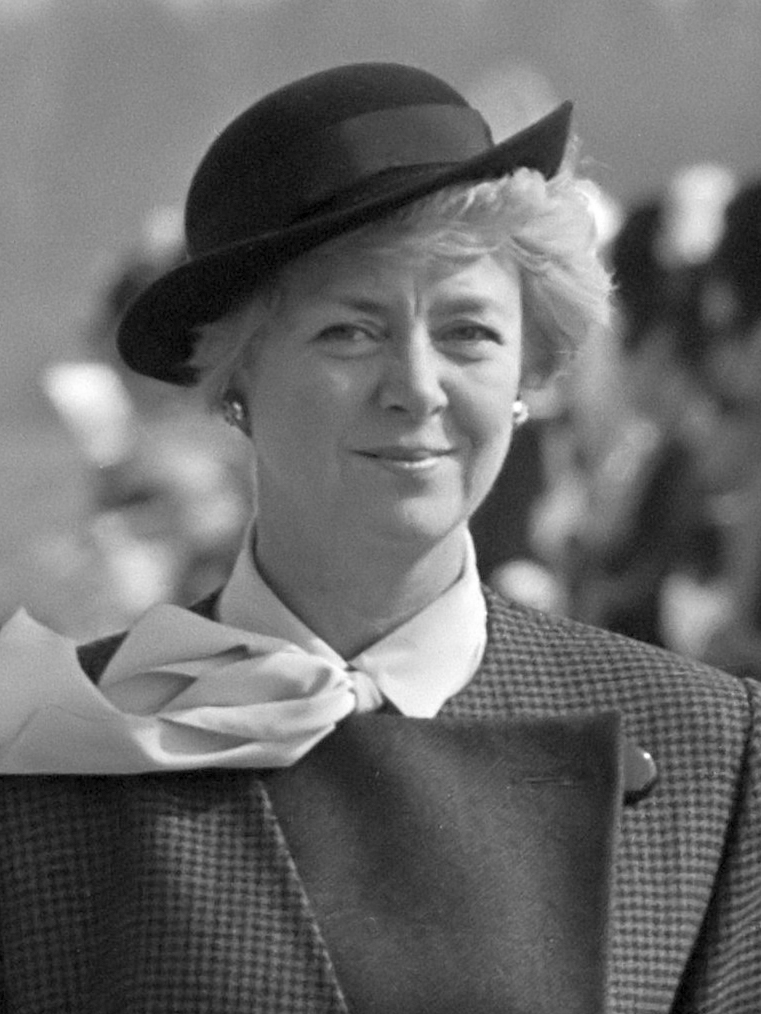
Vigdís Finnbogadóttir, President 1980–1996

- 22 March – Eyþór Þorláksson, guitarist and composer (d. 2018).
- 15 April – Vigdís Finnbogadóttir, politician.
- 26 May – Ragnhildur Helgadóttir, politician (d. 2016).
- 25 August – Baldur Ragnarsson, poet (d. 2018)
