= Tratex =

Geometric sans-serif typeface

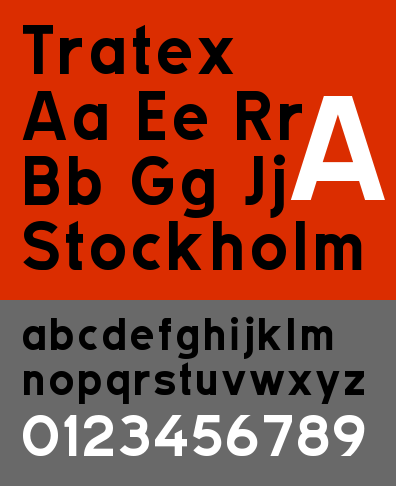
- Category: Sans-serif
- Classification: Geometric sans-serif
- Designer(s): Karl-Gustav Gustafson
- Foundry: Vägverket
- Date created: 2002
- Sample

Tratex (earlier called GePos) is a geometric sans-serif typeface family for road signs in Sweden. It was developed for maximal readability in traffic, and designed by Karl-Gustaf Gustafsson (known as Kåge Gustafsson).

Since 2014, Tratex has also been used on road signs in the Swedish-speaking autonomous region of Åland in Finland.

Tratex also contains Sami characters. It is free to download and use for illustrations and prints.

== See also ==
- Public signage typefaces
- Roads signs in Sweden
