= Road signs in Iceland =

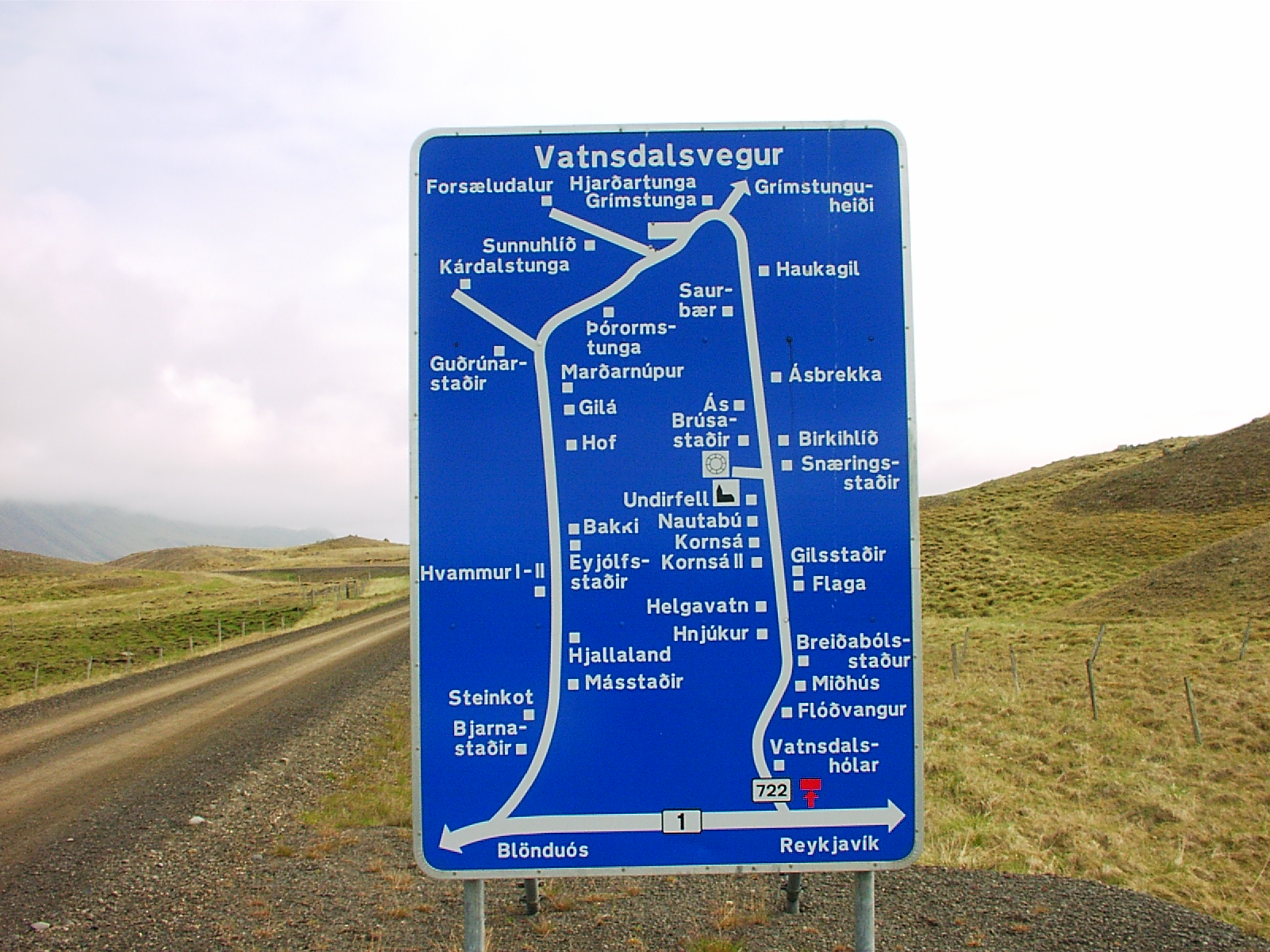
A sign displaying the location of scattered farms and homesteads in a rural area of Iceland

Road signs in Iceland are visual communication devices placed along roads throughout the country to provide information, warnings, and guidance to motorists and pedestrians. Iceland never ratified the Vienna Convention on Road Signs and Signals, but road signs in Iceland conform to the general pattern of those used in most other European countries, with certain design elements borrowed from Danish and Swedish practice. Given the low volume of traffic in most rural areas, signs tend to be more sparsely employed there than in other European countries.

Most road signs in Iceland are not retroreflective, making them harder to see at night.

== Design ==
Distances and other measurements are displayed in metric units. All text within the main signs and on auxiliary signs is exclusively in Icelandic with very few exceptions.

=== Colours and shapes ===
Icelandic road signs most closely resemble their Swedish counterparts, with rounded corners and yellow backgrounds. However, there are many differences in detail, especially in the silhouettes used.

Shape and colour are used to indicate the function of signs:

Type of sign	Shape	Colours		
Type of sign	Shape	Border	Background	Text/Symbols
Warning	Triangular	Red	Yellow	Black
Prohibition	Circular	Red	Yellow	Black
Mandatory instructions	Circular	White	Blue	White
Supplementary	Rectangular	White	Blue	White
Supplementary	Rectangular	Red	Yellow	Black
Directions, sometimes	Rectangular	Black	Yellow	Black
Information	Rectangular	White	Blue	White

=== Typeface ===
A version of the Transport typeface employed on road signs in the UK – modified to include accented letters and the Icelandic letters æ, ð (eth) and þ (thorn) – is used on Icelandic road signs.

== Gallery ==
=== Warning signs ===
Dangerous curve to right

Dangerous curve to left

Dangerous curve first to right

Dangerous curve first to left

Steep ascent

Steep descent

Road narrows (from both sides)

Road narrows (from right side)

Road narrows (from left side)

Bumpy road

Bump

Roadworks (Temporary version -)

Road grading

Loose gravel

Risk of rockfalls (from right)

Risk of rockfalls (from left)

Road slippery when wet

Risk of ice on road

Dangerous shoulder

Unstable shoulder

Harbour ahead without barriers

Tunnel ahead

Dangerous intersection

Intersection with priority

Intersection with priority (merge from right)

Intersection with priority (merge from left)

Intersection with priority (from right side road)

Intersection with priority (from right side road)

Offset road junction right left, with priority

Offset road junction left right, with priority

Roundabout ahead

Traffic lights

Pedestrian crossing ahead

Pedestrians

Children

Bike crossing

Watch for horses

Watch for reindeer

Watch for cattle

Watch for sheep

Two-way traffic

Low-flying aircraft

Risk of strong crosswinds

Equestrian

Other danger

=== Priority signs ===
Give way

Stop

Priority road

End of priority road

Give way to oncoming traffic

Priority over oncoming traffic

=== Prohibitory signs ===
Prohibited entry (from this direction)

Closed to all vehicles

All motor vehicles prohibited entry

Cars prohibited entry

Tractors prohibited entry

Mopeds prohibited entry

Motorbikes prohibited entry

Snowmobiles prohibited entry

Trucks prohibited entry

Bikes prohibited entry

Pedestrians prohibited entry

Equestrian prohibited entry

Buses prohibited entry

Vehicles carrying dangerous goods prohibited entry

Transport of water-polluting substances prohibited entry

Width limit

Height limit

Minimum space between motor vehicles

Length limit

Total weight limit

Total weight limit of combination

Axle weight limit

Stop for checkpoint

Right turn prohibited

Left turn prohibited

U-turn prohibited

Overtaking prohibited

Overtaking by trucks prohibited

End of prohibition on overtaking

End of prohibition on overtaking by trucks

Maximum speed limit in kilometres/hour

End of maximum speed limit

Stopping prohibited

Parking prohibited

National speed limit applies (rural: 90 km/h)

=== Mandatory signs ===
Go right

Go left

Go straight

Turn right

Turn left

U-turn

Turn right or straight

Turn left or straight

Turn left or right

Keep right

Keep left

Pass either on side

Roundabout

Bikes only

Pedestrian path

Bikes and pedestrians only

Separate lanes for pedestrians and bikes

Path for riders

=== Special regulation signs ===
Use of lanes at an intersection

Reduction of available lanes (option 1)

Approach Lane merges right

Reduction of available lanes (option 2)

Lane markings

Direction signs

Direction signs

Direction signs

Direction signs

Direction signs

Bus stop

Taxi rank

Pedestrian crossing

One-way traffic

One-way traffic

Living street (pedestrian priority, 15 km/h)

End of living street

Urban area

End of urban area

Parking zone

Covered parking zone

Parking zone for buses

Parking zone for trucks

Parking zone for cars

Parking zone with charging station for electric cars

Parking zone for carvans

Parking zone for ambulances

Parking zone for bikes

Parking zone for motorbikes

Reserved parking place for handicapped vehicle

Reserved parking place for specific vehicle used by handicapped person

Beginning of zone with special speed limit

End of zone with special speed limit

Beginning of zone with parking restrictions

End of zone with parking restrictions

=== Information signs ===
Information sign

Turnaround space for large vehicles on right (tunnel)

Turnaround space for large vehicles on left (tunnel)

Place for allowing traffic to pass, both oncoming and from behind

Dead end

Bus terminal

Handicapped

Pedestrian underpass to the right

Pedestrian underpass to the left

Pedestrian overpass to the right

Pedestrian overpass to the left

Turnaround space for large vehicles on right (tunnel)

Turnaround space for large vehicles on left (tunnel)

Entrance to area

Exit from area

Traffic enforcement cameras

Maximum speeds

=== Route and direction signs ===
Directional signs within the urban Capital Region of Iceland (including Reykjavík and its surrounding areas) have a blue on white design. Outside the Capital Region, signs are generally black on yellow.

Destination ahead with route numbers

Destination ahead and map (a) within the Capital Region

Destination ahead and map (b)

Lane direction sign within the Capital Region

Destination ahead per lane

Destination ahead (a) with distances within the Capital Region

Destination ahead (b) with distances (rural)

Turn off (a) within the Capital Region

Turn off (b)

Turn off to place of interest, airport, harbour, public building or other place of service

Route direction

Route direction without number (Winter route)

Place (turn off)

Exit lane (a) within the Capital Region

Exit lane (b)

Unnumbered road

Road number

Road number (approach)

Abandoned farm

Destination and distance

County or municipal boundary sign

Beginning of the municipality

Notice of destination ahead

Street or road name

House numbers

Place name (e.g. a river)

=== Service signs ===
First aid or hospital

Hospital

Police station

Pharmacy

Emergency shelter

Emergency phone

Fire extinguisher

Information

Information booth

Public telephone

Public lavatory

Outhouse

Waste tank discharge

Town centre

Industrial place

Vacation houses

Place of interest (indoors)

Point of interest

Hiking trail

Picnic site

Viewpoint

Viewpoint with information

Rubbish bin

Rubbish container

Radio station/FM Frequency

Petrol station

Repair or Workshop

Tyre repair

Cars rental

Buffet or confectionery

Restaurant

Restaurant in private home

Hotel or motel

Hostel (sleeping bags only)

Youth hostel

Rental cabin

Refuge hut

Campsite

Caravan park

Cooking facilities

Shower

Hot tub

Laundry facilities

Meeting facilities

Internet access

Swimming pool

Recreation centre

Sports field

Horse hire

Horse track

Horse stables

Horsecart rental

Fishing

Ocean fishing

Whale watching

Ski lift

Ski lift with chair

Cross-country ski area

Snowcat trips

Golf course

Shooting range

Snowmobile rental

Water scooter rental

Bike rental

Boat rental

Water skiing

River rafting

Church

Cemetery

ATM

Bank

Post office

Tourist shop

Supermarket

Bakery

Food kiosk

Handicrafts

Greenhouse

Ice cream shop

Art gallery

Library

Aquarium

Livestock animals park

Dog hotel

Veterinarian

Music venue

Ferry

Boat trips

Commercial harbour

Fishing harbour

Airport

Aerodrome/Airstrip

=== Additional signs ===
When the "road condition" begins

On left

On right

On both sides

Extended

Extended indication on the left

Extended indication on the right

Extent of prohibition area

Duration (timing) of prohibition

Parking time limit

Parking places, parallel to road

Parking places, perpendicular to road

Parking places, angled

Distance

Handicapped parking

Arrow right

Turn left

Turn right

Arrow direction

Arrow left

Course of priority road at intersection

Course of the priority road

Course of the priority road

Caution, Blind people

Caution, Deaf people

Weight limit

Tow zone

New road surface

Unbridged river crossing

Slow road: Driving is difficult but not impossible for non-4×4 cars

Difficult road: 4×4 car recommended (these and "TORLEIÐI" are typically preceded with an F, e.g. F35)

Mountain road: Extremely difficult terrain, even in 4×4s

Blind hill

Blind hills ahead (multiple)

Area with higher accident risk

Single-lane paving (unpaved shoulders)

Start of gravel road, slow to 80 km/h (for the best conditions, vary by weather)

One-lane bridge

One-lane tunnel

Stop ahead

One-lane bridge (with width)

Running event on road (temporary)

== Historic signs ==
=== 1939 road signs ===
Uneven road

Series of bends

Crossroad

Danger

Yield

Stop (added only in 1945)

No vehicles

No entry

No motor vehicles except motorcycles

No motor vehicles

Weight limit

Speed limit

No overtaking

No stopping

No parking

Mandatory direction

Parking

Caution

Priority road

=== 1956 road signs ===
==== Warning signs ====
Uneven road

Left curve

Right curve

Double left curve

Double right curve

Crossroad

Yield

Roundabout

Children

Pedestrian crossing ahead

Road narrows

Roadworks

Other danger

==== Prohibitory signs ====
No vehicles

No entry

No right turn

No left turn

No overtaking

No goods vehicles

No cycles

Width limit

Height limit

Weight limit

Axle weight limit

Speed limit

End of speed limit

Stop

No stopping

No parking

Time-restricted parking

==== Mandatory signs ====
Mandatory direction (turn left)

Mandatory direction (turn right)

Keep left

Keep right

Keep right or left

Bicycle path

==== Information signs ====
Parking

Pedestrian crossing

Priority road

Priority road ends

First aid or hospital

Telephone

Lane direction (go straight)

Lane direction (turn right)

Lane direction (turn left)

Passing place

==== 1968 addition ====
Roundabout

No overtaking

No overtaking ends

Speed limit ends
