= Dagbjartur Grímsson =

Icelandic footballer

Personal information
- Date of birth: 30 January 1932
- Date of death: 2 April 1986 (aged 54)

International career
Years	Team	Apps	(Gls)
1957	Iceland	2	(0)

Dagbjartur Grímsson (30 January 1932 – 2 April 1986) was an Icelandic footballer. He played in two matches for the Iceland national football team in 1957.
