= Björgvin Hermannsson =

Icelandic footballer

Personal information
- Full name: Björgvin Hermannsson
- Date of birth: 27 June 1938
- Place of birth: Iceland
- Date of death: 24 May 2012 (aged 73)
- Position: Goalkeeper

Senior career*
Years	Team	Apps	(Gls)
- Valur

International career
1957	Iceland	1	(0)
- * Club domestic league appearances and goals

Björgvin Hermannsson (27 June 1938 – 24 May 2012) was an Icelandic footballer who played as a goalkeeper. He played domestic football with Valur and won one cap for the Iceland national football team, keeping goal in the 3–8 defeat to Belgium on 5 June 1957.
