= Litla-Hraun =

Icelandic prison

Coordinates: 63.8601666°N 21.1270096°W

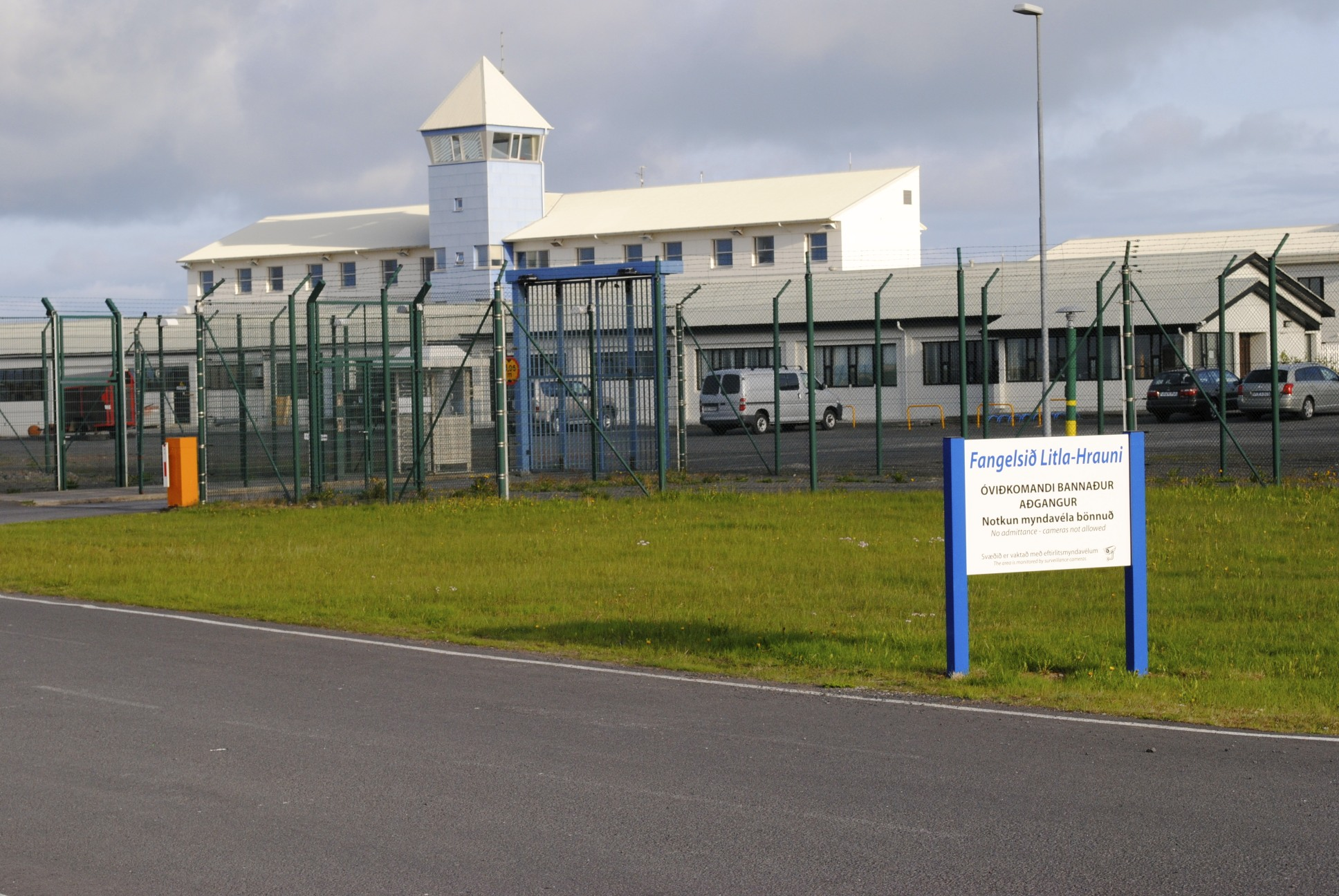
Litla-Hraun prison

Litla-Hraun (Icelandic pronunciation: [ˈlɪhtla-ˌr̥œyːn], "Little Lava") is the largest prison in Iceland. Located just outside Eyrarbakki, it consists of nine buildings inside a high-security fence.

Litla-Hraun was founded on March 8, 1929, as a single building. Inside the fence is a football field as well as some basketball facilities. Work programs include the making of license plates and car washing. Inmates get paid for their work according to a fixed rate set by the Prison and probation administration of Iceland.
