= 1928 Úrvalsdeild =

Úrvalsdeild
- Season: 1928

The 1928 Úrvalsdeild is a season of top-flight Icelandic football.

== Overview ==
This year only three team entered and yet again, KR won the championship.

== Final league table ==
Pos	Team	Pld	W	D	L	GF	GA	GD	Pts
1	KR (C)	2	2	0	0	6	2	+4	4
2	Valur	2	1	0	1	4	4	0	2
3	Víkingur	2	0	0	2	5	9	−4	0

Source: rsssf.com
Rules for classification: 1) points; 2) goal difference; 3) number of goals scored.
(C) Champions

== Results ==
Home \ Away	KR	VAL	VÍK
KR		1–0	5–2
Valur			4–3
Víkingur			
