= 1927 Úrvalsdeild =

Úrvalsdeild
- Season: 1927

The 1927 Úrvalsdeild is a season of top-flight Icelandic football.

== Overview ==
The number of teams dropped back to four as ÍBV did not enter. KR won the championship.

== Final league table ==
Pos	Team	Pld	W	D	L	GF	GA	GD	Pts
1	KR (C)	3	3	0	0	12	2	+10	6
2	Valur	3	2	0	1	5	3	+2	4
3	Víkingur	3	1	0	2	4	6	−2	2
4	Fram	3	0	0	3	0	10	−10	0

Source: rsssf.com
Rules for classification: 1) points; 2) goal difference; 3) number of goals scored.
(C) Champions

== Results ==
Home \ Away	FRA	KR	VAL	VÍK
Fram		0–6	0–3	0–1
KR			2–0	4–2
Valur				2–1
Víkingur				
