= Kristinn Gunnlaugsson =

Icelandic footballer

Personal information
- Date of birth: 12 July 1934
- Date of death: 10 June 2001 (aged 66)

International career
Years	Team	Apps	(Gls)
1955–1960	Iceland	9	(0)

Kristinn Gunnlaugsson (12 July 1934 – 10 June 2001) was an Icelandic footballer. He played in nine matches for the Iceland national football team from 1955 to 1960.
