= Ólafur Gíslason =

Icelandic footballer

Personal information
- Date of birth: 16 November 1936 (age 89)

International career
Years	Team	Apps	(Gls)
1956–1957	Iceland	2	(0)

Ólafur Gíslason (born 16 November 1936) is an Icelandic footballer. He played in two matches for the Iceland national football team from 1956 to 1957.
