= Björn S. Stefánsson =

Icelandic social scientist

Björn S. Stefánsson (born 19. June 1937) is an Icelandic social scientist. He is a member of Norwegian Academy of Science and Letters.

== Biography ==
Stefánsson graduated from high school in Reykjavik in 1956 and from Holar agricultural school on Island in 1957. He studied agricultural economy at Norwegian University of Life Sciences 1958-61. He was a research assistant at Norwegian University of Life Sciences 1965-68 and took his doctorate degree in 1968 (Lic.agric) which today compares to a Dr.scient. degree or a PhD. From 1968 he was a teacher at Hvanneyri landbruksskole and 1968-1976 he was head of the Icelandic statistical department. At the same time and after this he was free lance researcher and did economic research. In 1978 he was temporary professor at Nordiska institutet för samhällsplanering in Stockholm.

== Bibliography ==
- Demokrati med radvalg og fondsvalg (in Norwegian). Oslo: Department of Political Science, University of Oslo. 2003. ISBN 978-82-570-4861-7. "The document is a part of the series «Forskningsrapport» (Universitetet i Oslo. Institutt for statsvitenskap) - (volume-/issue. 9/2003 [i.e. 2/2003])"
  - With Sveinur Ísheim Tummasson (2010). Fólkaræði við raðvali og grunnval (in Faroese). Tórshavn: Stiðin.
  - Democracia con votaciones posicionales y votaciones de fondos. Madrid: Gondo. 2010. "Serie: Colección Estado y democracia"
  - Lýðræði með raðvali og sjóðvali (in Icelandic). Reykjavík: Háskólaútgáfan. 2003.
- "Ofveiði, of lítil veiði eða kjörveiði". Náttúrufræðingurinn (in Icelandic). 70 (2–3). 2000–2002. "Overfiske, for lite jakt og fiskeforhold"
- "Efnahagslögmál hafsins". Ægir (in Icelandic). 93. 2000.
- "Sex framboðslistar með sama manninum". Ný Saga (in Icelandic). 8. 1996.
- "Afköst og atvinnuöryggi". Saga (in Icelandic). 34. 1996.
- "Þróun sjávarútvegs við vistarbandsákvæði". Saga (in Icelandic). 33. 1995.
- On the fundamental thought behind voting rules. Reykjavík: University of Iceland, Faculty of Economics and Business Administration. 1995. "Series: Institute of Economic Studies. Working paper series, Reprint, W95:06; originally published in «Quality and Quantity» November 1995, Volume 29, Issue 4, pp 433-438"
- "Tengsl viðskiptahagsmuna dana og landhelgissamningsins 1901". Saga (in Icelandic). 31. 1993.
- "Íslenzkt guðspjallarit Jóns biskups Arasonar". Saga (in Icelandic). 28. 1990.
- "Áhrif trúarboðskapar á atvinnuhætti". Saga (in Icelandic). 28. 1990.
- "Forsendur og fyrirstaða nýsköpunar á 17. og 18. öld". Saga (in Icelandic). 26. 1988.
- "Húsbændur og hjú". Ný Saga (in Icelandic). 1. 1987.
- "Ef Danir stjórnuðu Hænanhéraði í Kína". Saga (in Icelandic). 25. 1987.
- Kommunale reformer på Island etter 1945 (in Norwegian). Stockholm: Nordiska inst. för samhällsplanering (Nordplan). 1983. "Nordiska Institutet för Samhällsplanering. Meddelande, 1983, 1."
- "Torskekrigen". PaxLeksikon. 6 : So-Å; Register (in Norwegian). Oslo: Pax forlag. 1981. pp. 282–283. ISBN 978-8253009827.
- "Island". PaxLeksikon. 3 : H-Ks (in Norwegian). Oslo: Pax forlag. 1979. pp. 231–239. ISBN 978-8253009773.
- Þjóðfélagið og þróun þess (in Icelandic). Reykjavik: Iðunn. 1978.
- Gruppevalg mellom tre eller flere alternativ (in Norwegian). Stockholm: Nordiska inst. för samhällsplanering (Nordplan). 1979. "Meddelande / Nordiska institutet för samhällsplanering, 1979:3."
