= Halldór Sigurbjörnsson =

Icelandic footballer (1933–1983)

Personal information
- Date of birth: 3 October 1933
- Date of death: 29 April 1983 (aged 49)

International career
Years	Team	Apps	(Gls)
1954–1957	Iceland	8	(0)

Halldór Sigurbjörnsson (3 October 1933 – 29 April 1983) was an Icelandic footballer. He played in eight matches for the Iceland national football team from 1954 to 1957.
