= Þorgeir Þorgeirson =

Icelandic writer, translator and filmmaker

Þorgeir Þorgeirson (30 April 1933 – 30 October 2003) was an Icelandic writer, translator and filmmaker, one of the first Icelandic graduates of foreign film schools. In 1987 he was found guilty of defaming the Icelandic police in two newspaper articles and fined; he then sued the Icelandic state in the European Court of Human Rights, which in 1992 in an influential ruling found in his favour.

== Early life and education ==
Þorgeir was born in Hafnarfjörður; his father, Þorgeir Elís Þorgeirsson, died in August 1937. He had an older sister, a younger brother, and three younger half-sisters. He attended Menntaskólinn í Reykjavík and then studied German, literature and history of art at the University of Vienna. He then studied filmmaking, first in Paris at French television in 1955–57, then in Prague at FAMU in 1959–62. He was one of the first Icelanders trained in filmmaking abroad.

== Career ==
Þorgeir worked as a filmmaker from 1962 to 1972, creating short documentaries such as Róður (Rowing) and Maður og verksmiðja (Man and Factory, 1967), which in 1968 was shown at the Edinburgh Film Festival and at the Locarno International Film Festival, where it won an honorary award. In 1968 he founded the Icelandic Cinema Museum (Kvikmyndasafnið).

From 1973 to 1976 he taught at the Leiklistarskóli SÁL, an independent drama school.

Þorgeir also directed radio broadcasts, wrote fiction, poetry and essays, and translated a range of works into Icelandic. He became known as a writer with his novel Yfirvaldið (The Authority, 1973), about a criminal case in 19th-century Iceland, which was nominated for the 1975 Nordic Council's Literature Prize.

=== Defamation case ===
In December 1983 Þorgeir published two articles in the newspaper Morgunblaðið in which he alleged that there was a serious problem with police brutality in Reykjavík. He was prosecuted and on 16 June 1986 found guilty under article 108 of the General Penal Code of 1940 of defamation of a civil servant, and fined 10,000 krónur; on 20 October 1987 the Supreme Court rejected his appeal. He then sued the state of Iceland in the European Court of Human Rights in Strasbourg, which on 25 June 1992 rejected his claim of judicial irregularity but found in his favour that his conviction violated Article 10 of the European Convention on Human Rights, guaranteeing freedom of expression. He was awarded costs of 530,000 krónur. The case affected Icelandic law and is often cited.

== Honours ==
He was an honorary member of the Association of Icelandic Filmmakers. In 2000 he received an Edda Award for his services to Icelandic film.

== Private life ==
In 1999 Þorgeir's spelling of his patronymic with one 's' rather than the conventional Þorgeirsson was officially recognised by the Icelandic civil registry after almost seven years, during which he had not voted in elections.

Þorgeir was married to the writer Vilborg Dagbjartsdóttir, with whom he had a son and a step-son.
