= Hjalti Einarsson =

Icelandic handball player (born 1938)

Personal information
- Nationality: Icelandic
- Born: 23 June 1938 (age 88) Iceland
- Height: 186 cm (73 in)

Sport
- Sport: Handball
National team
| Years | Team | Apps | (Gls) |
| – | Iceland | 63 | (0) |

Hjalti Einarsson (born 23 June 1938) is an Icelandic former handball player who competed in the 1972 Summer Olympics.
