= Halldór Halldórsson =

Icelandic footballer

Personal information
- Full name: Halldór Axel Halldórsson
- Date of birth: 13 April 1931
- Date of death: 14 November 2003 (aged 72)
- Position: Defender

Senior career*
Years	Team	Apps	(Gls)
- Valur
1950	Lincoln City Reserves	6	(1)

International career
1949–1957	Iceland	11	(1)
- * Club domestic league appearances and goals

Halldór Axel Halldórsson (13 April 1931 – 14 November 2003) was an Icelandic footballer who played as a defender. He made eleven appearances for the Iceland national team from 1949 to 1957.

Halldórsson had a month-long trial with English side Lincoln City in 1950, appearing six times for their reserves and scoring once in the Midland League, before returning to Valur.
