= Icelandic Transport Authority =

- Samgöngustofa
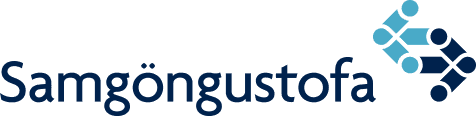

Agency overview
- Preceding agencies: Umferðarstofa; Flugmálastjórn Islands
- Type: Government agency
- Jurisdiction: Iceland
- Headquarters: Ármúla 2, 108 Reykjavík
- Employees: 140
- Minister responsible: Minister of Infrastructure
- Agency executive: Jón Gunnar Jónsson, Director
- Website: samgongustofa.is

Icelandic Transport Authority (Icetra; Icelandic: Samgöngustofa) is the transport agency of Iceland which regulates all modes of transport in Iceland: air, road and sea. Its head office is in Reykjavík.
