= Skúli Nielsen =

Icelandic footballer (born 1937)

Personal information
- Date of birth: 8 February 1937 (age 89)

International career
Years	Team	Apps	(Gls)
1957	Iceland	2	(0)

Skúli Nielsen (born 8 February 1937) is an Icelandic footballer. He played in two matches for the Iceland national football team in 1957.
