= Birgir Sigurðsson (writer) =

Icelandic writer

Birgir Sigurðsson (28 August 1937 – 9 August 2019) was an Icelandic writer.

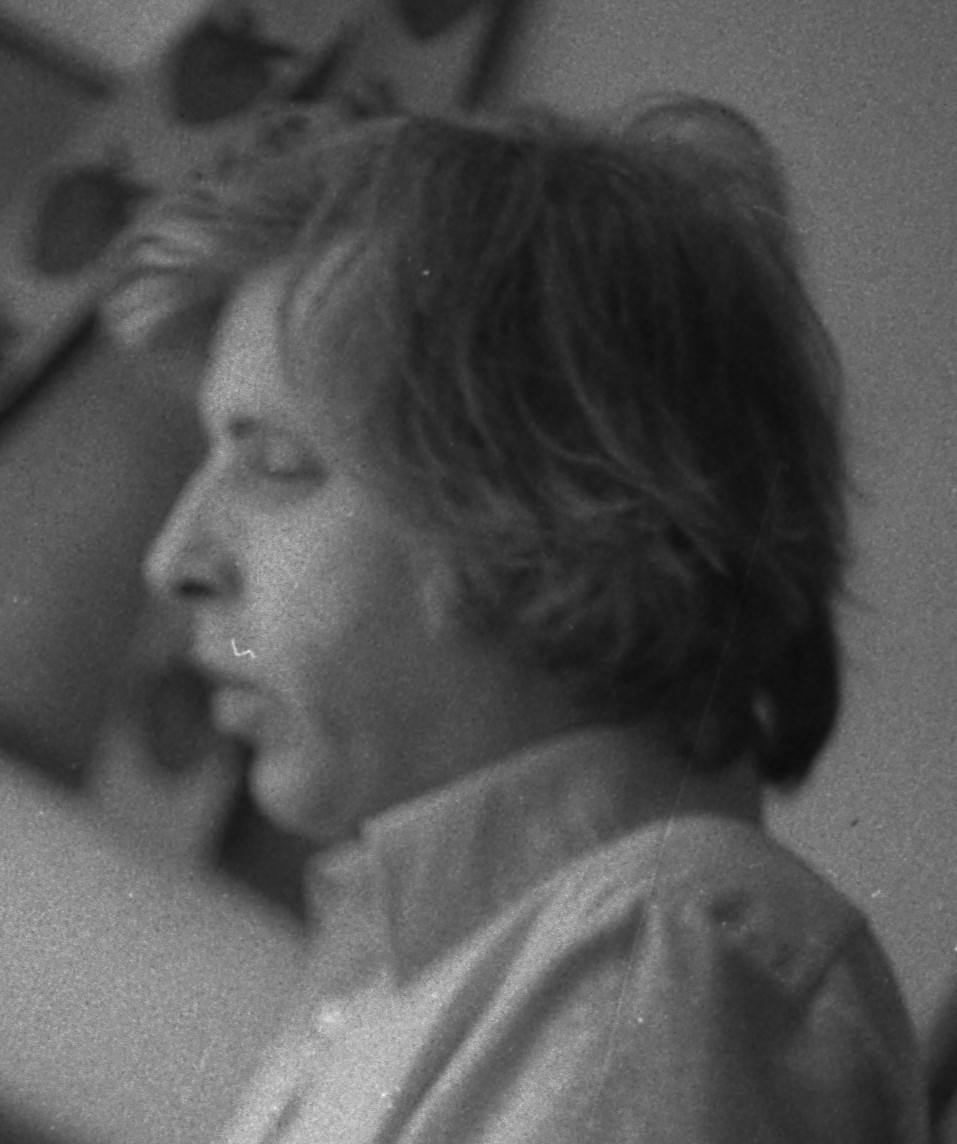
Icelandic writer Birgir Sigurðsson (1937) in his home in Reykjavík in 1976.

A journalist and schoolteacher in Iceland from the early 1960s, studied classical singing in Amsterdam in the late sixties but returned to teaching in Reykjavík and writing prolifically on the side. He established himself as a playwright and a poet during the seventies and became a full-time writer during the early 1980s, translating Sam Shepard for the Icelandic National Theatre and Doris Lessing's The Grass is Singing, with whom he formed a lifelong friendship. With his play Dagur Vonar he cemented his reputation as one of Iceland's greatest dramatists. Later he turned to writing novels, popular history books and TV documentaries.

From 1982 to 1986, Sigurðsson was the vice president of The Writer's Union of Iceland. From 1985 to 1987, he served as president of the Association of Icelandic Artists. He was also a member of the Reykjavík Art Festival committee from 1985 till 1987.

== A list of works ==
- Réttu mér fána 1968 (poetry)
- Á jörð ertu kominn 1972 (poetry)
- Pétur og Rúna (play)
- Selurinn hefur mannsaugu (play)
- Skáld-Rósa 1978 (play)
- Grasmaðkur 1983 (play)
- Dagur Vonar 1987 (play)
- Frá himni og jörðu 1989 (short stories)
- Svartur sjór af síld : síldarævintýrin miklu á sjó og landi 1989 (illustrated history)
- Hengiflugið 1993 (novel)
- Óskastjarnan 1998 (play)
- Ljósið í vatninu 2000 (novel)
- Dínamít 2005 (play)
- Prívat og persónulega 2009 (autobiographical short stories)
- Er ekki nóg að elska 2015 (play)

== See also ==
- List of Icelandic writers
- Icelandic literature
