= Elsa G. Vilmundardóttir =

Icelandic geologist and writer (1932–2008)

Elsa Guðbjörg Vilmundardóttir
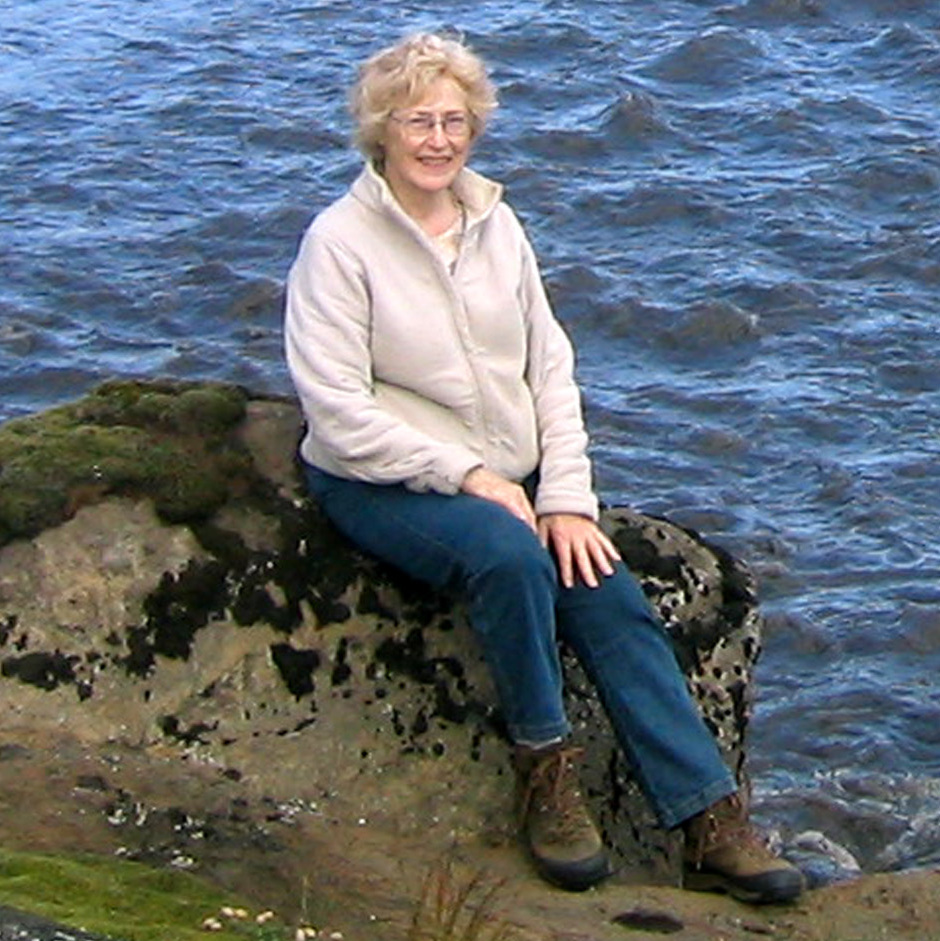
- Vilmundardóttir in 2004
- Born: 27 November 1932; Vestmannaeyjar, Kingdom of Iceland
- Died: 23 April 2008 (aged 75)
- Occupation: Geologist

Elsa Guðbjörg Vilmundardóttir (27 November 1932 – 2008) was the first Icelandic woman to earn a degree in geology and the country's first female geologist. She co-founded the Icelandic Earth Association and served as its chair for four years.

== Life ==
Elsa Guðbjörg Vilmundardóttir was born in the Vestmannaeyjar. Her parents were Vilmundur Guðmundsson, an engineer from Hafnarnes, Reyðarfjörður (1907–1934), and Guðrún Björnsdóttir, a seamstress (1903–1975). At the age of three, she moved with her parents from the islands to Siglufjörður, where her father drowned shortly afterwards. She then lived with her maternal grandparents until the age of 12, when she moved to her mother's home in Reykjavík. She later married Pálmi, with whom she had two children, Guðrún Lára and Vilmundur. Vilmundardóttir died at Landspítali – University Hospital in Fossvogur on 23 April 2008, after becoming ill during a conference earlier that day. Her funeral was held at Áskirkja on 7 May.

Vilmundardóttir graduated from Menntaskólinn í Reykjavík in 1953. In 1958, she enrolled at Stockholm University, where she studied geology until 1963. During her university years, she conducted geological fieldwork during the summers for the Electricity Department, focusing on research related to the proposed Búrfellsvirkjun hydropower plant. Her research interests soon centred on the geology of Tungnáröræfa. After completing her studies, she returned to Iceland and worked for the Electricity Department, and later for the National Energy Authority (NEA) when it was established in 1967. She remained at the NEA until her retirement in 2004.

In 1980, the NEA and Landsvirkjun signed an agreement on uniform geological mapping, for which Vilmundardóttir served as supervisor. Her work also included mapping tuff and lava north of Vatnajökull, as well as studying pyroclastic flows associated with prehistoric Hekla eruptions. She published scientific research and was co-author of 100 Geosites in South Iceland (2005). Over the course of her career, she specialised in the study of tuff formations.

== Career ==
At the beginning of her career, Vilmundardóttir was self-employed and worked part-time jobs between 1963 and 1978 to support her family. She became involved in various projects, beginning with the Electrical Energy Office Agency in 1963, along with contractor work in Icelandic energy research. Much of her work focused on power plants in the southern highlands and in Fljótsdalur.

Vilmundardóttir was active in a number of organisations and social initiatives. She was a co-founder of the Icelandic Earth Association and served as its chair for four years. She also chaired the Energy Agency for two years. In addition, she co-founded the Health Circle and was its vice-chair for 16 years (1982–1998). In this role, she frequently spoke at events, wrote articles to promote the association’s work, and regularly chaired its meetings.

Her professional contributions included extensive work on geological mapping, such as mapping lava and moss. She supervised the geological mapping of the Þjórsá river basin, a project established in 1980 through an agreement between Orkustofnun and Landsvirkjun. Between 1983 and 1999, a total of 21 maps were published in preparation for the study of bedrock, soil, and water in the area.

Vilmundardóttir was also involved with the Kópavogur branch of the Red Cross. In 2002, she contributed to the board's decision to shift the organisation's focus and significantly strengthen voluntary work in the Kópavogur community. She actively participated in the department's clothing sorting project in the capital area, served as assistant director, and sat on the department's emergency committee, where she was particularly engaged in emergency prevention.

== Research ==
Vilmundardóttir's research focused primarily on geological mapping, particularly of lava and tuff formations in the southern highlands of Iceland. She led a coordinated geological mapping project of the Þjórsá river basin, which was conducted jointly by the National Energy Authority (NEA) and Landsvirkjun.

She carried out research across various parts of Iceland, but much of her work concentrated on the southwest of Vatnajökull. Her research was closely tied to her professional work: while employed at the Electricity Office, a predecessor of the NEA, she was involved in studies of the Þjórsá river basin. When the development of geological maps of the basin began in 1980, she devoted both her working hours and vacation time to fieldwork in support of the project. Between 1983 and 1999, this work produced a series of geological maps of the area.

Later in her career, Vilmundardóttir expanded her research to include the eastern eruptive belt of Iceland and associated tuff formations. Overall, her contributions centred on the production of detailed geological maps, which became important resources for both scientific research and energy development projects.

=== Selected works ===
- Vilmundardóttir, Elsa G., et al. Bergflokkun og eðlismassi aurs. Orkustofnun Geoscience Division, Reykjavík, 1983.
- Vilmundardóttir, Elsa G. Berggrunnskort af Möðrudalsfjallgörðum og nágrenni. Orkustofnun Rannsóknasvið, Reykjavík, 1997.
- Vilmundardóttir, Elsa G., et al. Borhole HH-01 Haukholt í Hreppum: Geological report. Orkustofnun Geoscience Division, Reykjavík, 1999.
- Vilmundardóttir, Elsa G., et al. Borhole LL-03 Laugalandi í Holtum: Geological report. Orkustofnun Geoscience Division, Reykjavík, 1999.
- Vilmundardóttir, Elsa G., et al. Búðarhálsvirkjun – Borhola ST-1: Setgreining. Orkustofnun Raforkudeild, 1979.
- Vilmundardóttir, Elsa G., et al. "Frá starfsemi félagsins starfsárið 1989–1990." Jökull, vol. 40, no. 1, 1990.
- Vilmundardóttir, Elsa G., et al. "Veiðivötn: jarðfræðikort." Orkustofnun and Landsvirkjun, 1990. hdl:10802/29024
- Vilmundardóttir, E. G., and I. Kaldal. "Holocene Sedimentary Sequence at Tràvidarlaekur Basin, Pjósárdalur, Southern Iceland." Jökull, 1982.
- Vilmundardóttir, Elsa G., et al. "Late Holocene (ca. 4 ka) Marine and Terrestrial Environmental Change in Reykjarfjörður, North Iceland: Climate and/or Settlement?" Journal of Quaternary Science, vol. 16, no. 2, 2001, pp. 133–143.
- Vilmundardóttir, Elsa G., et al. "Geochemistry, Dispersal, Volumes and Chronology of Holocene Silicic Tephra Layers from the Katla Volcanic System, Iceland." Journal of Quaternary Science, vol. 16, no. 2, 2001, pp. 119–132.

Additional references include obituaries and tributes, such as:

- "Elsa Guðbjörg Vilmundardóttir." Mbl.is, 11 May 2008.
- Journal of Quaternary Science. Wiley Online Library.

== See also ==
- Timeline of women in science
