= Bjarni Jónsson (artist) =

Icelandic painter

Bjarni Jónsson (15 September 1934 – 8 January 2008) was an Icelandic painter.

He was notable for his paintings of old Icelandic fishing boats, many of which have been added to the National Museum of Iceland, Þjóðminjasafn Íslands. He studied with and was taught by esteemed Icelandic artists such as Kjarval and Ásgrímur Jónsson. He was an avid Rotarian, a member of the Hafnarfjörður division of Rotary International. Jónsson died in his home in Iceland on January 8, 2008.
