= Hringur Jóhannesson =

Icelandic painter

Hringur Jóhannesson (December 21, 1932 – July 17, 1996) was an Icelandic painter. He graduated from Myndlista- og handíðaskóli Íslands (Icelandic School of Arts and Crafts) in 1952. He had his first art exhibition in 1962.

Hringur held 40 exhibitions and 70 group art exhibitions in Iceland and abroad. He also worked as an art teacher from 1952 to 1962. He illustrated many newspapers and magazines as well.

Hringur died at the Landspítali hospital in Reykjavik.
