= Bryndís Pétursdóttir =

Icelandic actress (1928–2020)

- Born: 22 September 1928; Fáskrúðsfjörður, Iceland
- Died: 21 September 2020 (aged 91); Iceland
- Education: Verzlunarskóli Íslands
- Occupation: Actress
- Years active: 1946–2010
- Spouse: Örn Eiríksson
- Children: 3
- Relatives: 9 grandchildren

Bryndís Pétursdóttir (22 September 1928 – 21 September 2020) was an Icelandic actress who performed on film, theatre, radio and television. She was a graduate of both the Verzlunarskóli Íslands and Lárus Pálsson's Drama School performed in multiple productions by the National Theatre of Iceland until 1998.

== Early life and education ==
On 22 September 1928, Bryndís was born in Vattarnes, Fáskrúðsfjörður. She was the youngest of eight children of the managing director Guðlaug Sigmundsdóttir and the farmer and lighthouse keeper Pétur Sigurðsson. Her schooling occurred at the Verzlunarskóli Íslands, and she went on to matriculate to Lárus Pálsson's Drama School when she was 16 years old. She subsequently graduated from the school.

== Career ==
Bryndís made her debut on the stage as Cecilía in Jónsmessudraum at the poverty home on November 18, 1946, under the direction of Pálsson. She went on to make her first appearance at the National Theatre of Iceland as Guðrún in New Year's Night that same year. In 1949, Bryndís portrayed the girlfriend of Ingavar called Sigrún in the first ever Icelandic feature film Milli fjalls og fjöru. She played the main role of Dóra in Niðursetningnum that saw her character left alone on a farm and abused by the son of the farmer two years later. Bryndís played the part of Rosalind in the National Theatre production Sem yður þóknast and Helga in Gullna hliðinu from 1952 to 1955.

She also portrayed Doris in Brosinu dularfulla, Enuice in Sporvagninum Girnd as well as Munda í Stalín er ekki hér, Essi in Er á meðan er, Helena Charles in Horfðu reiður um öxl, Helga in Kaffi, Julia in Romanoff og Júlíu, Louise in Eftir syndafallið, Maria in í Gullna hliðinu, Sybil in Pilti og stúlku, Ismena in Antígónu Anouhils, Vala in Lausnargjaldi, and Leonora in Æðikollin, Bryndís also had roles in acting on film, radio and television. She portrayed a lead role in the 1980 television film Vandarhögg. In 1998, Bryndís retired from National Theatre productions and had her final radio role on the six one-act play Einförum conceived by Hrafnhildur Hagalín for older actors twelve years later.

== Personal life ==
She was married to the aeronautical scientist Örn Eiríksson until he died in 1996. They had three children. Bryndís died on 21 September 2020. A funeral service was held for her in the afternoon of 1 October at Fossvogskirkja with close family present.

== Character ==
Ari Gísli Bragason described Bryndís as "a unique woman, gorgeous everywhere she went, warm and expressed her openness and kindness to her surroundings and transport people. She loved her family unconditionally and the love and affection that one experienced and always saw so strongly with her".
