= Jakob Jakobsson =

Icelandic footballer

Jakob Jakobsson (20 April 1937 – 25 January 1964) was an Icelandic footballer who played for ÍB Akureyri and the national team.

Jakob was born in Grenivík but grew up in Akureyri, where he graduated in 1957 from Akureyri Junior College. His parents were Matthilda Stefánsdóttir and Jakob Gíslason; he had three brothers, of whom the two oldest also played for Akureyri.

== Football career ==
He joined Akureyri as a youth and made his debut with the first team in 1954, when he was 17. He was selected for the Icelandic national team in 1957 but was unable to play; he was a substitute when the team visited Ireland in 1960 and played in two international matches in 1961.

== Death ==
Jakob was in his final months of studying dentistry in Erlangen, in Germany, when he was killed in a car crash at the age of 27; the driver lost control and collided with the wall of the town hall in Baiersdorf, and Jakob was ejected and fractured his skull. The driver and his wife, with whom Jakob was boarding, were hospitalised with serious injuries.

Starting in the year of his death, 1964, first ÍB Akureyri and later Knattspyrnufélag Akureyrar played an annual match in memory of Jakob Jakobsson.
