= 1929 Úrvalsdeild =

Úrvalsdeild
- Season: 1929

Statistics of Úrvalsdeild in the 1929 season.

== Overview ==
In 1929 six teams entered with KA playing for the first time and ÍBV returning. The rules of the competition stated that, if more than five teams entered, the championship should be decided in a knock-out competition. Because two teams had travelled a far distance to get to the championship (all matches were still played in Reykjavík), it was decided that the competition would be a two-loss elimination. .

KR won the championship.

== Competition ==
Team 1	Score	Team 2
Víkingur	3–0	KA
Valur	4–1	ÍBV
KR	7–1	Fram
ÍBV	4–1	Víkingur
Valur	0–0	KA
ÍBV	2–1	Fram
Fram is eliminated
KR	2–1	Víkingur
Víkingur is eliminated
Valur	4–0	KA
KA is eliminated
KR	3–0	ÍBV
ÍBV is eliminated

=== Final ===
Team 1	Score	Team 2
KR	3–1	Valur
