= 1926 Úrvalsdeild =

Úrvalsdeild
- Season: 1926

The 1926 Úrvalsdeild is a season of top-flight Icelandic football.

== Overview ==
For the first time since the inaugural year, 1912, a team outside Reykjavík participated, taking the number of teams to an unprecedented five. Like the first year ÍBV was the only team outside the capital to enter. KR won the championship.

== Final league table ==
Pos	Team	Pld	W	D	L	GF	GA	GD	Pts
1	KR (C)	4	3	1	0	17	6	+11	7 (Note: Since KR and Fram were tied on points they played a championship playoff, which was won by KR with a score of 8–2.)
2	Fram	4	3	1	0	7	4	+3	7
3	Víkingur	4	2	0	2	9	6	+3	4
4	ÍBV	4	0	1	3	9	17	−8	1
5	Valur	4	0	1	3	8	17	−9	1

Source: rsssf.com
Rules for classification: 1) points; 2) goal difference; 3) number of goals scored.
(C) Champions

== Results ==
Home \ Away	FRA	KR	VAL	VÍK	ÍBV
Fram		2–2	2–1	1–0	2–1
KR			6–1	3–1	6–2
Valur				1–4	5–5
Víkingur					4–1
ÍBV					
