= Road signs in Sweden =

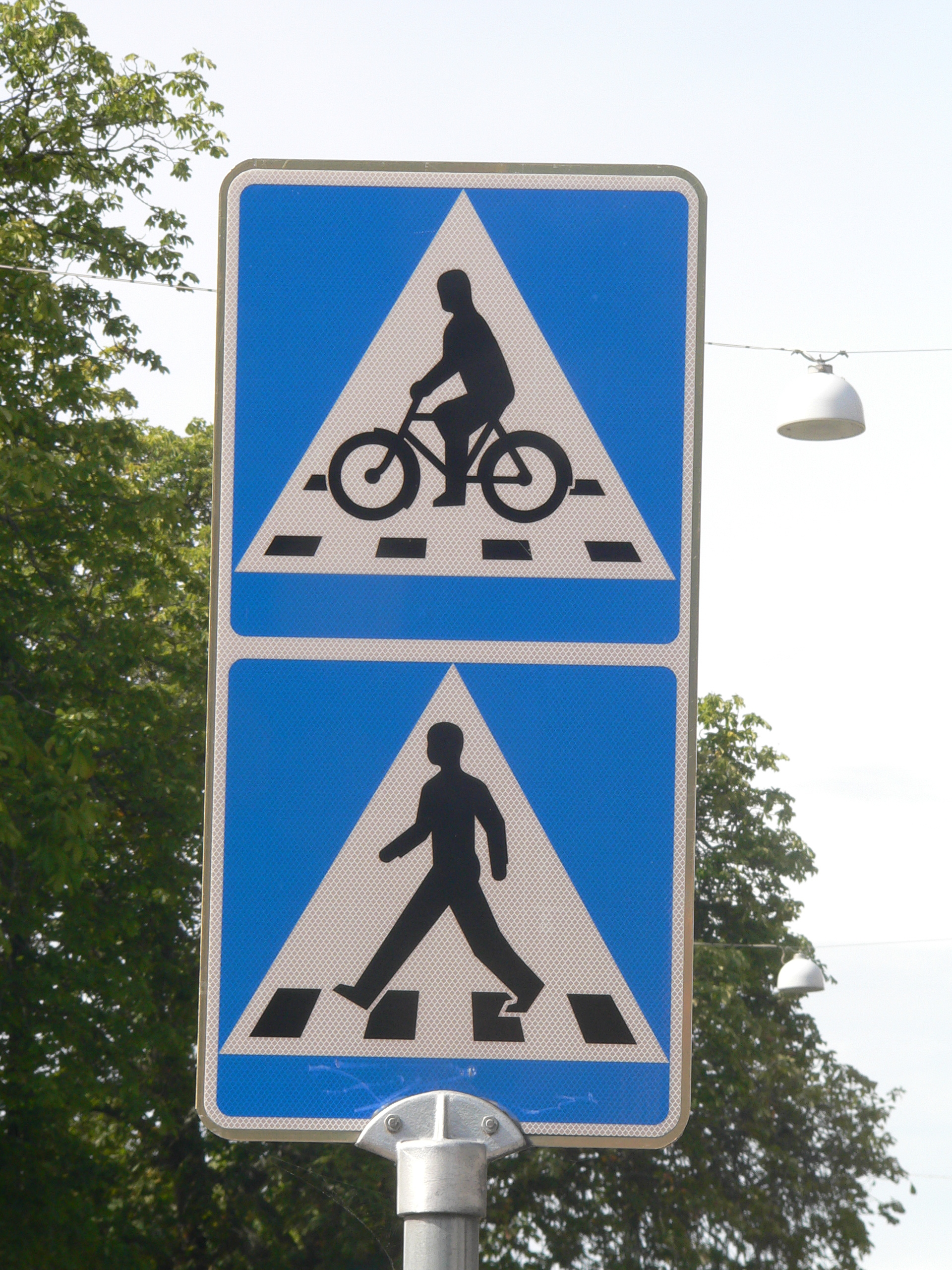
Pedestrian and cyclist crossing signs in Malmö

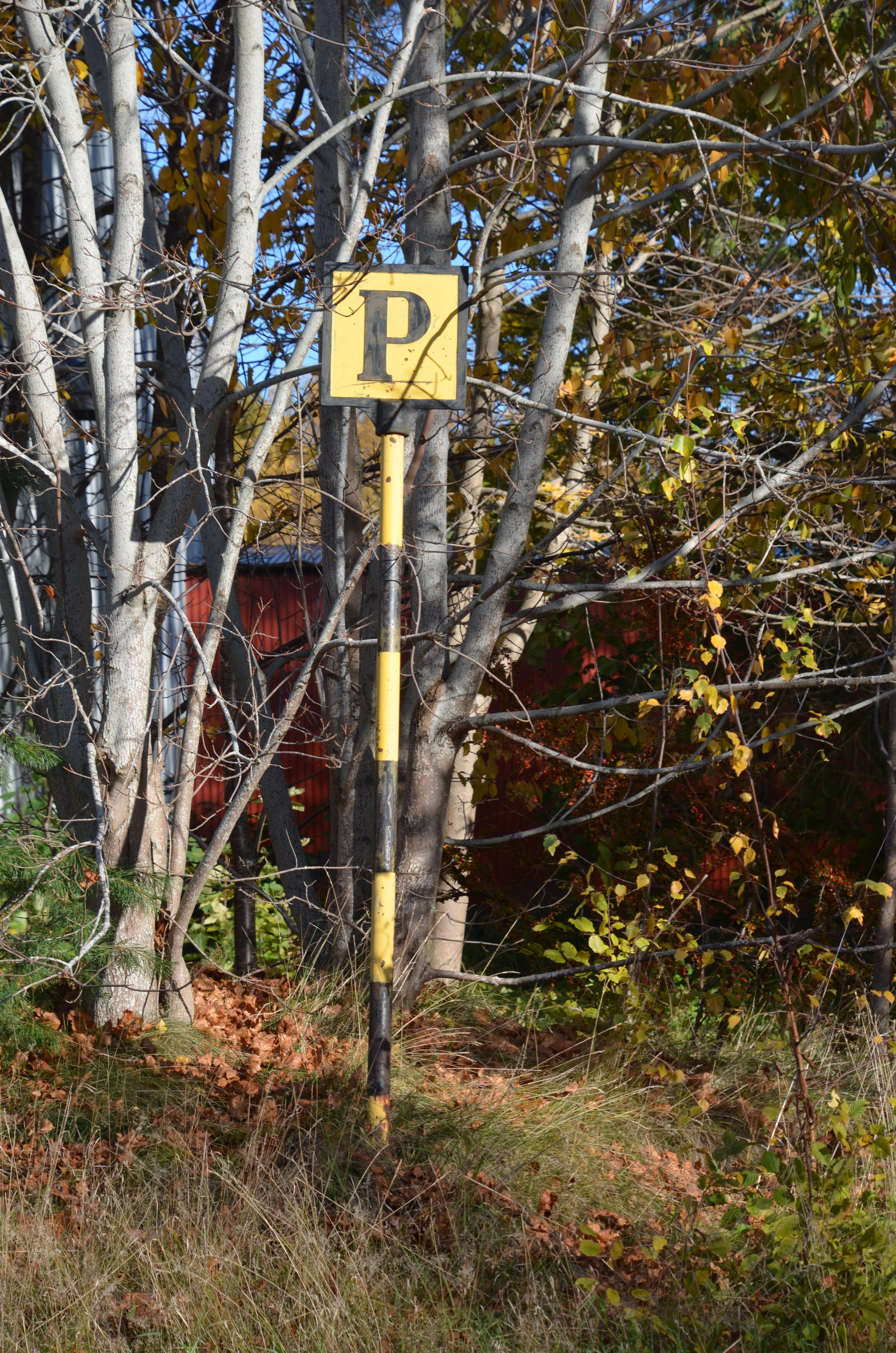
Road sign for parking lot, 1937 – 1951

Road signs in Sweden are regulated in the Traffic Sign Ordinance (2007:90) (VMF, Swedish: Vägmärkesförordningen).

Most signs are based on pictograms, with some exceptions like the prohibition-sign for stop at customs and signal and speed limit signs. If the sign includes text, the text is written in Swedish, except the stop sign, which is written in English ("STOP").

Swedish road signs depict people with realistic (as opposed to stylized) silhouettes.

All signs have a reflective layer added on selected parts of the sign as is custom in European countries; most larger signs also have their own illumination.

The typeface used on Swedish road signs is Tratex.

== Major differences between Swedish and general European signs ==
Like other countries in Europe, Swedish signs follow the Vienna Convention on Road Signs and Signals. Whereas European signs usually have white background on warning and prohibition signs, the Swedish signs have a yellow/orange colour. This is for the purpose of enhancing the visibility of the sign during the winter, as white signs would be hard to see in the snow. The prohibition signs have a red line across them if there is a symbol on them, not if it is a numeric value. General European prohibition signs do not usually have such a red line. Traffic signs in Iceland and Finland are quite similar.

== History ==
Around 1930 some warning signs and prohibitory signs looking like today's signs with yellow background were introduced. The direction indication signs were however yellow with black text. Around 1960, there was a reform where the colour of those were changed to dark blue with white text, together with a major road number reform. Around 1978, Sweden followed the Vienna convention rule that motorways should have a different colour, so green was introduced for them, and medium blue for ordinary roads.

== Private road direction sign ==
Private road sign

A road defined as private (Swedish legal word: "enskild") in Sweden, is a road that is not maintained by the state or a municipality, but by a private person or private association. An owner of a private road in Sweden can prohibit cars (but not people) from using the road. The background of the sign is yellow, indicating that the quality is often poorer, and warning signs might be missing. Signs indicating roads owned by companies or leading to companies usually have white background instead.

== Warning signs ==
Warning signs are triangular in shape and have red borders, but in contrast with those of most other countries that use triangular warning signs, Swedish signs have yellow backgrounds, rather than white. More types of warning signs for animals are used than in most European countries, such as moose, deer, wild boar, reindeer, sheep, horse, and cow appearing alongside roads.

Dangerous curve to left

Dangerous curve to right

Dangerous curves ahead, first to left

Dangerous curves ahead, first to right

Steep downhill

Steep uphill

Road narrows on both sides

Road narrows on right sides

Road narrows on left sides

Unprotected quayside or riverbank

Uneven road

Speed refulcation bump

Dip

Slippery road

Loose chipings

Falling rocks (from) right

Falling rocks (from) left

Pedestrian crossing

Pedestrian

Children

Cyclist and mopeds rides on carrigeway

Skiers crossing

Equestrian

Moose

Deer

Cattle

Wild horses

Reindeer

Sheep

Wild boars

Roadworks

End of roadworks

Traffic signals

Low-flying aircraft

Side winds

Two-way traffic

Tunnel

Dangerous shoulder

Dangerous crossing

(thick is priority road) Road intersection where drivers of vehicles on connecting roads have a duty to give way Perpendicular connection from the left and right

(thick is priority road) Road intersection where drivers of vehicles on connecting roads have a duty to give way 45-degree connection from the left and right

(thick is priority road) Road intersection where drivers of vehicles on connecting roads have a duty to give way 135-degree connection from the left and right

(thick is priority road) Road intersection where drivers of vehicles on the connecting road have a duty to give way Perpendicular connection from the left, 45-degree connection from the right

(thick is priority road) Road intersection where drivers of vehicles on the connecting road have a duty to give way Perpendicular connection from the left, 135-degree connection from the right

(thick is priority road) Road intersection where drivers of vehicles on connecting roads have a duty to give way 45-degree connection from the left, perpendicular connection from the right

(thick is priority road) Road intersection where drivers of vehicles on connecting roads have a duty to give way 135-degree connection from the left, perpendicular connection from the right

(thick is priority road) Road intersection where drivers of vehicles on connecting roads have a duty to give way 45-degree connection from the left, 135-degree connection connection from the right

(thick is priority road) Road intersection where drivers of vehicles on connecting roads have a duty to give way 135-degree connection from the left, 45-degree connection connection from the right

(thick is priority road) Road intersection where drivers of vehicles on connecting road have a duty to give way Perpendicular connection from the left

(thick is priority road) Road intersection where drivers of vehicles on connecting road have a duty to give way 45-degree connection from the left

(thick is priority road) Road intersection where drivers of vehicles on connecting road have a duty to give way 135-degree connection from the left

(thick is priority road) Road intersection where drivers of vehicles on connecting road have a duty to give way Perpendicular connection from the right

(thick is priority road) Road intersection where drivers of vehicles on connecting road have a duty to give way 45-degree connection from the right

(thick is priority road) Road intersection where drivers of vehicles on connecting road have a duty to give way 135-degree connection from the right

(thick is priority road) Road intersection where drivers of vehicles on connecting roads have a duty to give way.

(thick is priority road) Road intersection where drivers of vehicles on connecting road have a duty to give way.

(thick is priority road) Road intersection where drivers of vehicles on connecting road have a duty to give way.

(thick is priority road) Road intersection where drivers of vehicles on connecting roads have a duty to give way.

(thick is priority road) Road intersection where drivers of vehicles on connecting road have a duty to give way.

(thick is priority road) Road intersection where drivers of vehicles on connecting road have a duty to give way.

Roundabout

Slow moving vehicles

Horse drawn-carts

Off-road-vehicles

Traffic congestion

Level crossing with barrier

Level crossing without barrier

Tramway

Level crossing countdown
(3 stripes 3/3 to crossing )
(2 stripes 2/3 to crossing)
(1 stripe 1/3 to crossing)

Single track level crossing

Multi track level crossing

Other hazard

Accident

== Priority signs ==
The pedestrian and bicycle crossing signs are priority signs in Sweden, whereas the pedestrian crossing sign is regarded as a special regulation sign in the Vienna convention on road signs and signals. A sign for bicycle crossing is not yet implemented in the Vienna convention.

Give way

Stop

Pedestrian crossing (male)

Pedestrian crossing (female)

Priority road

End of priority road

Priority for oncoming vehicles

Priority over oncoming vehicles

Cyclist crossing

== Prohibitory signs ==
Prohibitory signs are circular in shape with yellow backgrounds and red borders, except the international standard stop sign that is an octagon with red background and white border and the no parking and no standing signs that have a blue background instead of yellow.

No entry

Closed to all motor vehicles in both directions

No motor vehicles

No motor vehicles with more than two wheels

No motorcycles

No towed trailers

No trucks

No tractors
(formerly used)

No vehicles transporting dangerous goods

No bicycles

No mopeds

No horse-drawn vehicles

No snowmobiles

No horses

No pedestrians

No vehicles exceeding width shown

No vehicles exceeding height shown

No vehicles exceeding length shown

Minimum distance between motor vehicles

No vehicles exceeding weight shown

No vehicles or combination of vehicles exceeding weight shown

No vehicles with a single axle weighing more than the weight shown

No vehicles exceeding weight shown on a tandem axle

No left turn

No right turn

No U-turns

No overtaking

No overtaking by trucks

Speed limit

End of overtaking prohibition

End of overtaking prohibition by trucks

Stop at the sign if the signal shows red
(only applies when driving towards the signal concerned)

Stop for police control. There are variants STOPP VAKT (stop for guard) STOPP FÄRJA (stop here when waiting for ferry)

No parking or waiting

No parking on odd days

No parking on even days

Date-based parking

No stopping or standing

No motor vehicles with studded tires

Restriction zone.
In this example, this is no parking zone. However, the restriction doesn't apply when the signs inside the zone says otherwise.

End of the restriction zone

=== Stop at customs ===
The sign "Stop at customs" ("Stopp vid tull") is multilingual and exists in four variants.

Danish

Finnish

German

Norwegian

== Mandatory signs ==
Mandatory signs are always circular in shape with blue signs with white border.

Direction to be followed (turn left)

Direction to be followed (turn right)

Direction to be followed (go straight ahead)

Pass on the right

Pass on the left

Pass either side

Roundabout

Track for cyclists and mopeds

Footpath

Compulsory track for pedestrians, cyclists and moped drivers.

Compulsory track for pedestrians, cyclists and moped drivers. Dual track

Compulsory track for pedestrians, cyclists and moped drivers. Dual track

Track for rider on horseback (and pedestrians)

Track for off-road vehicles

Beginning of lane reserved for public transport (and cycles and mopeds Class II).

End of lane reserved for public transport (and cycles and mopeds Class II).

== Special regulation signs ==
Motorway

End of motorway

Expressway

End of expressway

Built-up area

End of built-up area

Pedestrian area

End of pedestrian area

Residential area

End of residential area

Low-speed road (recommended top speed)

End of low-speed road

Maximum recommended speed (in km/h)

End of maximum recommended speed (in km/h)

One-way traffic

Dead end

Passing place

Parking (max 24 hours on weekdays except weekday before Sunday or holiday).

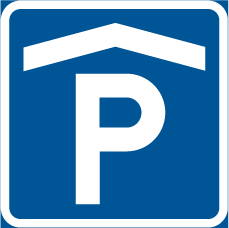
Covered parking

Bus stop

Taxi rank

Toll road

== Signs giving information ==
Sign when entering Sweden from another country

Post office

Telephone

Radio station for road and traffic information

First aid

Industrial zone

Information

Workshop area

Petrol station

Cafe

Restaurant

Hotel

Hostel

Holiday chalets

Camping site

Caravan site

Rest site

Toilet

Bathing

Open-air recreation

Hiking trail

Chair lift

Tow lift

Golf course

Fishing licences on sale here

National heritage

Park and ride

The long turn — mandatory turning manoeuvre for pedal cycles and mopeds.

Advance direction sign, diagrammatic type

Advance direction sign, stack type

Lane preselection sign

Lane merge

Lane ends

Temporary sign, left most lane ends

Temporary sign, Lane merges with oncoming traffic

Temporary sign, oncoming traffic merges with this lane

Advance direction sign diagrammatic indicating prohibition of left turning

Direction sign flag type

Direction to motorway or expressway

Sign to specific district or area

Sign to place reached by a private road

Sign to local amenities

Sign to temporary event

Lane assignment type

Advance direction sign exit ahead from motorway or expressway

Advance direction sign exit ahead from other road than motorway or expressway

Direction sign exit sign

Number of exit

Lorries

Car

Airfield

Airfield straight ahead

Ferry

Place indication sign

Road number sign European highway

Main highways (other than European highways) numbered 1–499

Road number sign. Direction to a numbered road

Road number sign for traffic diversion

Confirmatory sign

Grouped destinations (i.e. For Pajala and Övertorneå, follow signs for Kiruna)

Recommended route for vehicles carrying dangerous goods

Tourist route

Tourist attraction area

Landmark

Recommended route for pedal cycles and mopeds

Recommended route for pedestrians

Disabled persons

Stack type design

Flag type sign

Place indication sign

Confirmatory sign

Bike track

== Other signs ==
End of road works

Limited access on side marker

Limited access marker

Limited access arrow marker

Marking for sharp curves, bridge parapets, abutment, walls, tunnel mouths etc. Arrow marker

Curve marker

Exit

== Additional panels ==
High voltage cable

Distance to

Stop and give way at specified distance ahead

Lateral clearance

Total weight

Times the restriction applies. Weekday; Weekday before Sunday or public holiday in brackets; Sunday and public holiday in red.

Parking permitted for specified period between times shown

No parking between times indicated

Blind persons crossing or in the vicinity of the road

Deaf persons crossing or in the vicinity of the road

All way stop

Parking configuration

Parking configuration

Parking configuration

Parking configuration

Parking garage

Length of stretch of road beginning at specified distance from sign

Length of stretch of road beginning at sign

Prohibition effective in both directions of the sign

Prohibition end at sign

Prohibition effective in the direction of arrow

Parking, effective in both directions of the sign

Parking ends at sign

Parking, effective in direction of arrow

Symbol plate for specified vehicle or road user category (lorry)

Symbol plate for specified vehicle or road user category (lorry)

Symbol plate for specified vehicle or road user category (handicapped)

Symbol plate for specified vehicle or road user category (car)

Symbol plate for specified vehicle or road user category (car)

Symbol plate for specified vehicle or road user category (bus)

Symbol plate for specified vehicle or road user category (bus)

Symbol plate for specified vehicle or road user category (motorbike)

Symbol plate for specified vehicle or road user category (bike)

Symbol plate for specified vehicle or road user category (caravan)

Symbol plate for specified vehicle or road user category (caravan)

Symbol plate for specified vehicle or road user category (car + caravan)

Symbol plate for specified vehicle or road user category (car + caravan)

Soft verges

Forestry vehicle crossing ahead

Direction sign

Direction sign

Direction sign

Direction of priority road at intersection shape

Two-way traffic on cycle and moped track

A Supreme Court case has clarified that if there are multiple individually framed additional panels for a road sign, they add information to the road sign, not to each other. The two panels in the case was Avgift (fee) and the other 4 hours 9–18, which means that there is mandatory fee anytime and maximum 4 hours 9 am-6 pm.

== Traffic light signals ==
Note: tip-down triangles indicates blinking/flashing light.

Standard & arrow Red: Stop.
Red + yellow: The light is turning to green.
Green: Proceed.
Yellow: Stop, but only if safe to do so.

Flashing yellow: Traffic light malfunction or out of service.

Cycles and moped lights.

Pedestrian lights.
Red: Don't walk.
Green: Walk.

Public transport lights.
"S": Stop.
"S" + "–": The light is turning to "I" / arrow.
"I" (or arrow): Proceed (for indicated direction).
"–": Stop, but only if safe to do so.

Lane-control signals.
Red cross: Lane closed.
Yellow arrow(s): Lane closed ahead, change to indicated lane(s).
Green arrow: Lane open.

Lights at level crossing.
Flashing reds: Stop.
Flashing white (optional): Signals are operational.

Light signals at opening or swing bridges, ferries, airfields, emergency service stations etc.
Flashing reds: Stop.

Flashing yellow(s), accompanied with a sign: Drive with extra caution.

== Road markings ==
Centre line

No overtaking line

Warning line

Centre line and no overtaking line

Centre line and warning line

Warning line and no overtaking line

Double no overtaking line

Reversible lane markings (lane that may be used for alternating direction of traffic flow)

Guide line

Reserved lane line

Bike lane marking

Broken edge line

Continuous edge line

Stop line

Give way line

Zebra crossing

Bike crossing

Lane selection arrows

Deflecting arrow

Obstruction marking; no crossing on or over that marking

Text conforming bus and taxi lane, text conforming stop line

Parking bay

Standing and parking prohibited

Parking prohibited

Parking prohibited

Bike and moped route

Advance warning of obligation to give way

Disabled persons

== Signals by police officers ==
Control

Advance direction sign control

13.3.1 Slow down
13.3.2 Follow the police car and pull up behind it when it stops
13.3.3 Slow down
13.3.4 Drive off the road and stop in front of the police car

== Historic signs ==
Road works (1951–1967)

Stop (1951–1967)

Derestriction (1951–1980)

Residential area (1998–2007)

End of residential area (1998–2007)

Exit (1967–1980)

=== 1931 road signs ===
Uneven road

Series of bends

Crossroad

Level crossing with barriers

Level crossing without barriers

Danger

Turn left

Turn right

=== 1937 road signs ===
Uneven road

Series of bends

Crossroad

Guarded level crossing

Unguarded level crossing

Other danger

Yield

No vehicles

No entry

No stopping

No parking

Built-up area, slow down

Customs

Turn left

Turn right

Marker for roundabout

Keep left

Parking

Passing place

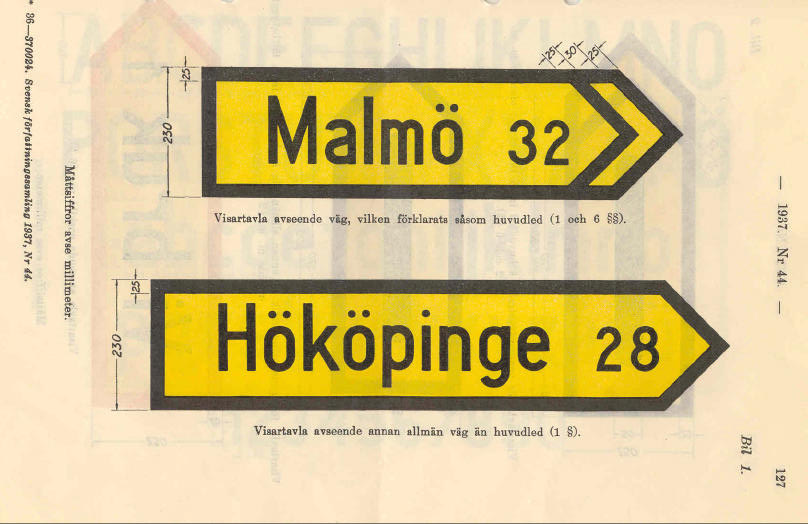
Direction

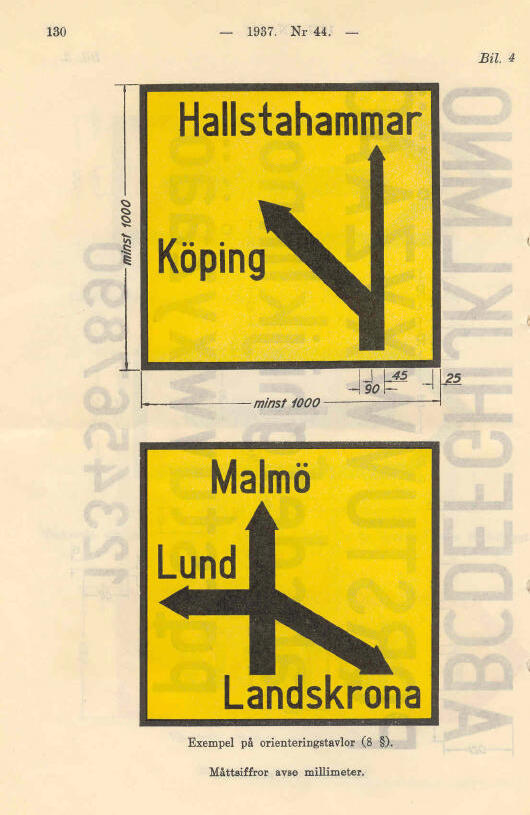
Direction

Advanced direction sign

=== 1951 road signs ===
==== Warning signs ====
Uneven road

Dangerous bends

Crossroad

Level crossing with gates

Level crossing without gates

Children

Roadworks

Opening bridge

Road narrows

Other danger

Give way

Countdown beacon

Countdown beacon

Countdown beacon

Countdown beacon

==== Prohibitory signs ====
No vehicles

No entry

No right turn

No left turn

No bicycles

No through road

No overtaking

Weight limit

Axle weight limit

Width limit

Speed limit

End of speed limit

Urban area (removed in 1955)

No stopping

No parking

Time-restricted parking

Stop

Stop - level crossing

Stop - customs

Stop line

==== Indicative signs ====
Turn left

Turn right

Roundabout marker

Keep left

Keep right

Keep right or left

Priority road

End of priority road

Pedestrian crossing

Parking

Passing place

Bicycle path

Bridle path

Lane direction (go straight)

Lane direction (turn right)

Lane direction (turn left)

First aid or hospital

Telephone

==== 1955 addition ====
Crossroad with priority

Two-way traffic

Pedestrain crossing ahead

Speed limit

Motor vehicles only
