= Bifrost (disambiguation) =

Bifrost or Bifröst is a bridge in Norse mythology.

Bifrost may also refer to:

== Arts and entertainment ==
- Bifrost (band), a Danish "flower power" rock band of the '70s and '80s
- Bifrost (magazine), a French science fiction magazine
- Bifrost (role-playing game), a role-playing game

== Computing ==
- Bifrost (Trojan horse), Windows malware
- Bifrost (microarchitecture), microarchitecture for GPU by ARM
- Bifröst, a meta-circular evaluator in OpenJDK part of the Valhalla OpenJDK Project

== Places ==
- Rural Municipality of Bifrost, Manitoba, Canada
- Bifröst (town), a small town in Iceland
  - Bifröst University, in Bifröst, Iceland
- Bifrost Ledge, Victoria Land, Antarctica

== Other uses ==
- Åsatrufellesskapet Bifrost, a Norwegian association for modern Asatru

== See also ==
- Biofrost, Chinese-Canadian League of Legends player
- Bitfrost, the security design specification for the One Laptop per Child XO computer, a low cost laptop intended for children in developing countries. The specification itself mentions that the name "Bitfrost" is a play on the Norse mythology concept of Bifröst.
