= 1911 in Iceland =

- Decades: 1890s; 1900s; 1910s; 1920s; 1930s
- See also: Other events in 1911 · Timeline of Icelandic history

The following lists events in 1911 in Iceland.

== Incumbents ==
- Monarch: Frederik VIII
- Prime Minister – Björn Jónsson (until 14 March); Kristján Jónsson (from 14 March)

== Events ==
- The University of Iceland is established.
- 11 May – Valur is founded.

== Births ==
- 14 January – Björn Hjörtur Guðmundsson, craftsman, master carpenter, idealist and environmental pioneer (d. 1998)
- 18 February – Auður Auðuns, lawyer and politician (d. 1999).
- 30 June – Sigurbjörn Einarsson, clergyman and doctor of theology, Bishop of Iceland (d. 2008)

=== Full date missing ===
- Hulda Jakobsdóttir, politician (d. 1998).

== Deaths ==
- Sigfús Eymundsson, photographer and bookseller (b. 1837)
