= Iceland earthquake =

Iceland earthquake may refer to:

- 2008 Iceland earthquake
- 2000 Iceland earthquakes, a doublet on June 17 and 21
- 2023-2024 Iceland earthquakes, a series associated with a magma intrusion

== See also ==
- List of earthquakes in Iceland
