= 1912 in Iceland =

- Decades: 1890s; 1900s; 1910s; 1920s; 1930s
- See also: Other events in 1912 · Timeline of Icelandic history

The following lists events in 1912 in Iceland.

== Incumbents ==
- Monarch: Frederik VIII (until 14 May); Christian X (starting 14 May)
- Prime Minister – Kristján Jónsson (until 24 July); Hannes Hafstein (from 24 July)

== Events ==
- The 1912 Úrvalsdeild season was the first season of league football in Iceland.
- Kveldúlfur was established.
- Íshúsfélag Ísfirðinga was established.
- The Farmers' Party was established.
- Bandalag íslenskra skáta was founded.

== Births ==
- 8 January – Sigurður Þórarinsson, geologist, volcanologist, and glaciologist (d. 1983).

== Deaths ==
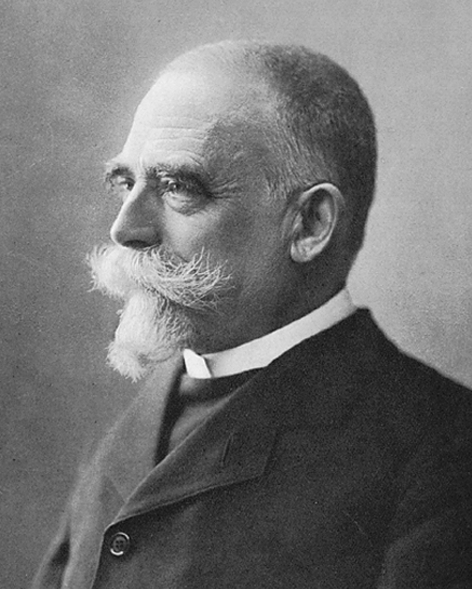
Björn Jónsson

- 31 August – Indriði Indriðason, spiritualist medium (b. 1883)
- 24 November – Björn Jónsson, politician (b. 1846)
