= 1909 in Iceland =

- Decades: 1880s; 1890s; 1900s; 1910s; 1920s
- See also: Other events in 1909 · Timeline of Icelandic history

The following lists events that happened in 1909 in Iceland.

== Incumbents ==
- Monarch: Frederik VIII
- Prime Minister – Hannes Hafstein, Björn Jónsson

== Events ==
- 11 April – Ungmennafélagið Afturelding is founded
- UMFS Dalvík is founded

== Births ==
- 15 April – Friðjón Skarphéðinsson, politician (d. 1996)
- 15 May – Ingólfur Jónsson, politician (d. 1984)
- 17 July – Guðmundur Ívarsson Guðmundsson, politician (d. 1987)
- 18 November – Svavar Guðnason, painter (d. 1988)

== Deaths ==
- 16 December – Hallgrímur Sveinsson, the fifth Bishop of Iceland (1889-1908)
