= 1902 in Iceland =

- Decades: 1880s; 1890s; 1900s; 1910s; 1920s
- See also: Other events in 1903 · Timeline of Icelandic history

Events in the year 1902 in Iceland.

== Incumbents ==
- Monarch: Christian IX
- Minister for Iceland: Peter Adler Alberti

== Events ==
- 20 February – The Federation of Icelandic Cooperative Societies is founded.
- The National Defence Party is established.
- Sögufélag is founded.

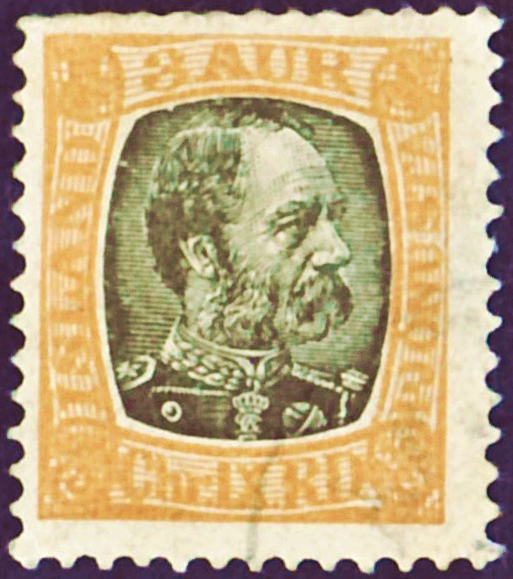
1902 Stamp of Danish-Iceland.
