= 1910 in Iceland =

- Decades: 1890s; 1900s; 1910s; 1920s; 1930s
- See also: Other events in 1910 · Timeline of Icelandic history

The following lists events in 1910 in Iceland.

== Incumbents ==
- Monarch: Frederik VIII
- Prime Minister – Björn Jónsson

== Events ==
- December – The newspaper Vísir is founded.

== Births ==
- 20 July – Þórunn Elfa Magnúsdóttir, writer (d. 1995).
- 9 November – Bragi Sigurjónsson, politician (d. 1995).
- 29 December – Gunnar Thoroddsen, politician (d. 1983)

== Deaths ==
- 9 February – Páll Melsteð, historian, official, editor and member of the Althing (b. 1812).
