= Baula =

Mountain of Iceland

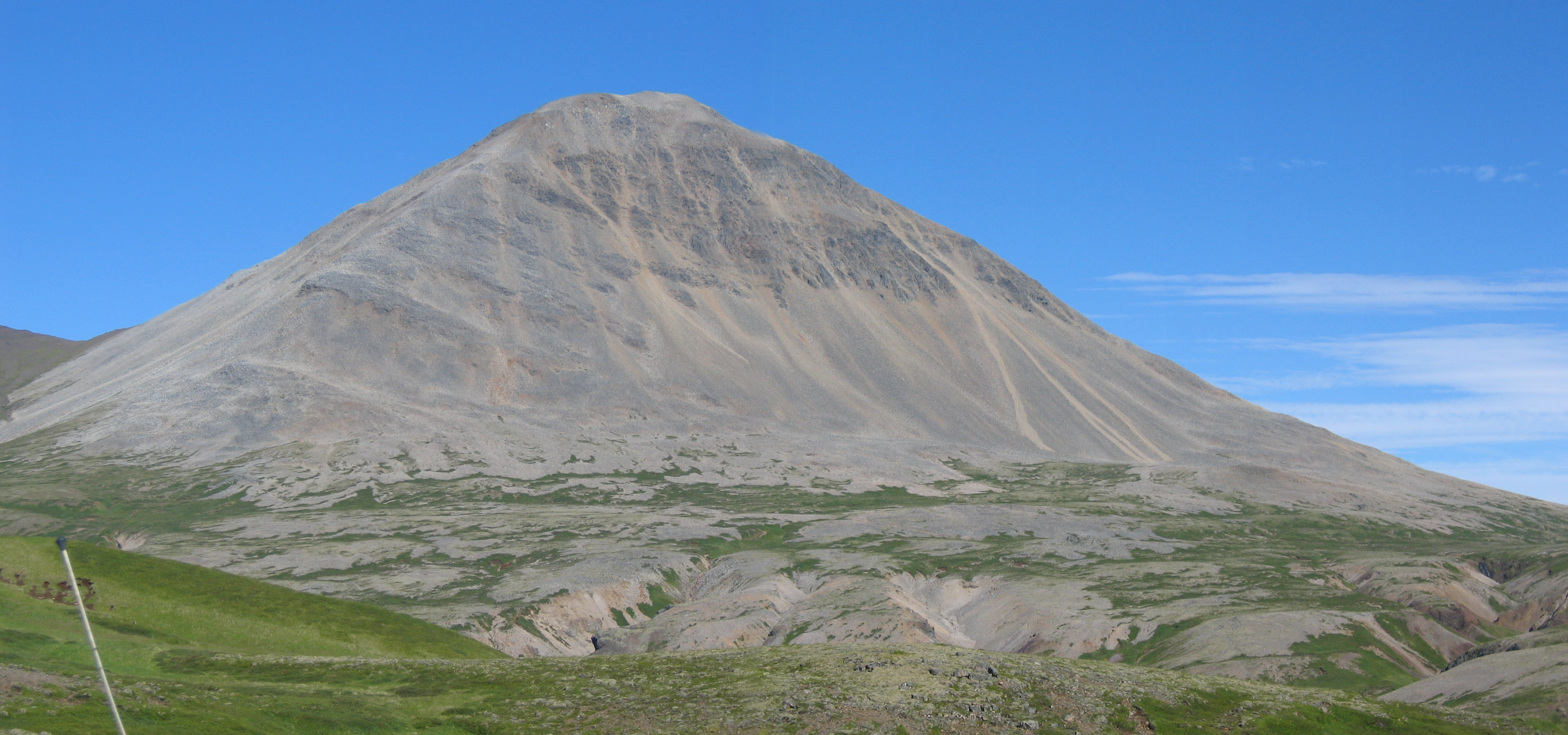
- Baula, July 2006

Highest point
- Elevation: 934 m (3,064 ft)
- Coordinates: 64°53′N 21°24′W

Geography
- Location within Iceland
- Location: Iceland

Geology
- Rock age: 3.4 million years
- Mountain type: Laccolith

Baula (Icelandic pronunciation: [ˈpœyːla]) is a mountain situated in the west of Iceland near Route 1, Bifröst University, and the craters of Grábrók. The mountain's reddish or orange hue is caused by its rhyolite rock composition.

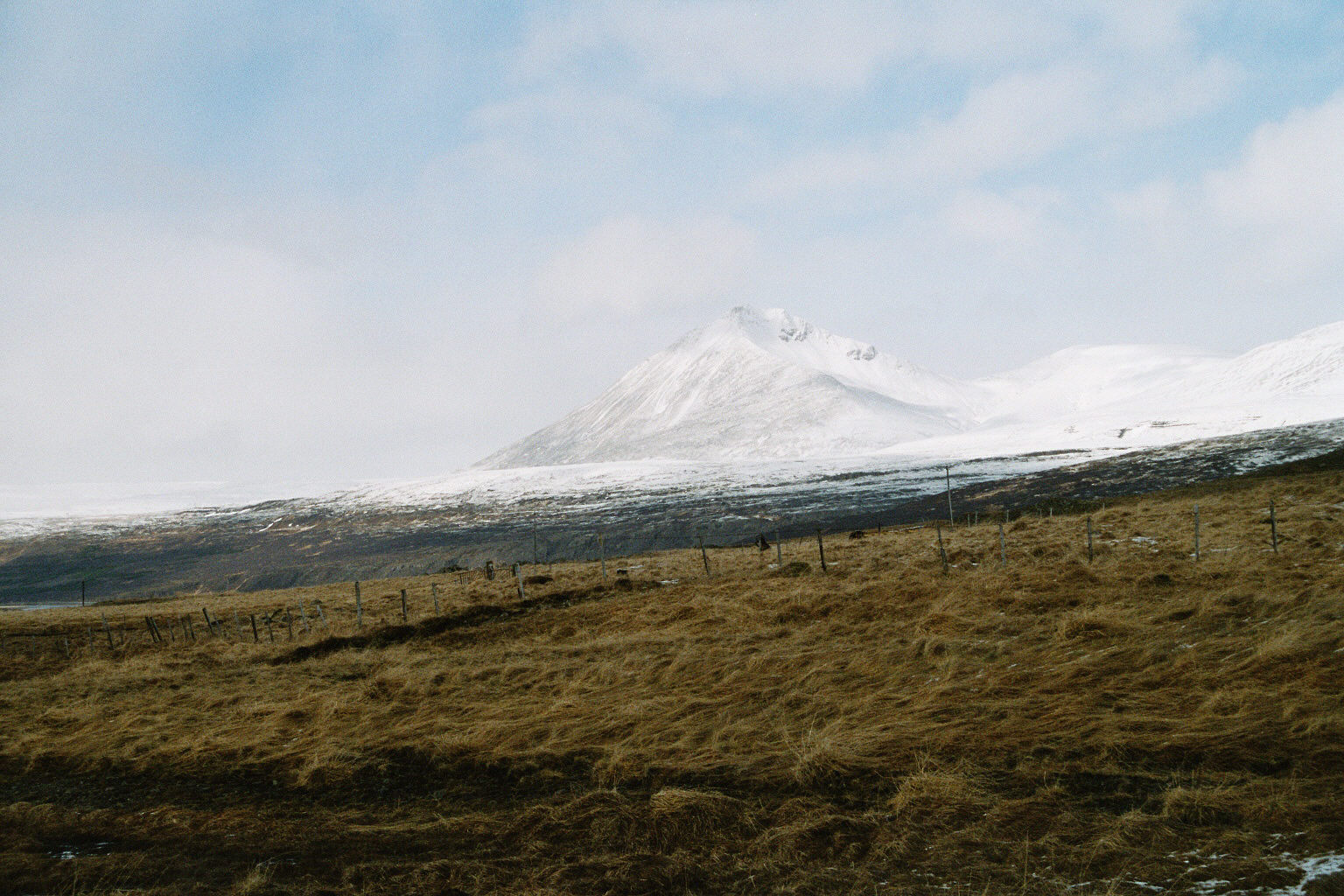
The mountain Baula

Geologically, the mountain is a laccolith, a type of igneous intrusion. It was formed 3.4 million years ago.

Baula is characterized by its almost perfect cone. Nearby is Baula's “little sister,” a mountain called Litla-Baula, where rare columns of rhyolite are found. Together, Baula and Litla-Baula have often been described as Iceland's most beautiful pair of mountains.

== See also ==
- Volcanism of Iceland
