= Paleontology in Iceland =

Iceland is geologically quite young, and mostly formed from volcanic processes, so fossils there are rare. The oldest fossils found in Iceland are from the Miocene, about 15 mya, and are plant remains. In addition to plant remains, fossilized remains of insects from the Miocene and Pliocene have been found. Miocene and Pliocene fossil sites are found mainly in the West of Iceland and the Westfjords. Remains of invertebrates have been found In Ice age strata, especially in fresh water and marine sediments. It is rare to find fossil remains of land animals in Iceland, although remains of deer bones have been found.

== Fossiliferous strata ==
Between the layers of the basaltic plateau lavas in Iceland, there is an abundance of clay rich reddish silt- and sandstone layers. These layers are formed from ancient soil wherein are preserved the fossilized remains of plants. It is estimated that about five to ten thousand years passed on average between the formation of two adjacent layers that make up the basaltic plateau. Volcanic eruptions with frequency of one in every few years facilitated soil formation and thus enabled plants to gain a foothold. In the sediments between the basalt layers there are in places marks left by stems and leaves along with carbonated plant material. These sediments, however, are not the only ones that carry plant remains, among the thickest sediments among the basaltic formations there are finely grained silt and clay sediments formed in basins that once were filled by ancient lakes (lacustrine deposits). These sediments also include plant fossils. Some invertebrate remnants have been found in Ice age sediments, especially in fresh water and marine sediments. Remains of marine invertebrates can abundantly be found in the sediments at Tjörnes peninsula.

== Plant fossils ==
Remains of plants from the Cenozoic have been found in sediments, giving information on climate, vegetation and wildlife at that time. Plant fossils are most commonly found in sedimentary rocks of the West of Iceland and the Westfjords.

=== Plant fossils found in basalt layers ===
Fossilized plant material from the late Cenozoic have been found in basalt layers. These are most commonly holes and traces from branches and tree trunks while Pseudomorphs (in this case basaltic casts of tree trunks) have also been found.

=== Lignite ===
Lignite is abundant in sediments between the basalt layers. Lignite from the Westfjords and Tjörnes contains mainly the remnants of conifers such as pine, giant sequoia, Glyptostrobus and larch but also deciduous trees. A variety of plant remnants have been found in adjacent sediments. These remnants are mainly preserved in silty or sandy fresh water sediments, e.g. in Surtarbrandsgil in Brjánslækur.

=== Cenozoic flora ===
Fossilized Icelandic vegetation older than 10 million years old shows similarities to vegetation that grew in the deciduous forests of North America and bears witness to a milder climate than is currently prevalent on the island. It is therefore likely that, at this time or earlier, there was a land bridge between proto-Iceland and North America. The average temperature must have been around 8-12 °C in this period.

==== Warm temperate climate ====
The vegetation remains in the Þórishlíðarfjall mountain in Selárdalur are around 15 million years old and contain the remnants of warm temperate forest of deciduous and coniferous trees. The most abundant are beech, chestnut, elm, linden, magnolia, Cercidiphyllum, Glyptostrobus, giant sequoia and Sequoia abietina.

==== Temperate climate ====
Vegetation remains in Dufansdalur in Fossafjörður (in Arnarfjörður) contain 13.5 million years old remains of a forest, which grew in temperate climates. Most abundant are beech, birch, hornbeam and elm are most common, but angiosperms are more pronounced than gymnosperms. The remains in Surtarbrandsgili at Brjánslækur and at Seljá in Vaðalsdalur are estimated to be about 12 million years old. Most notable are fir, spruce, giant sequoia, bay laurel, magnolia, maple, alder, birch, willow, tulip trees, elm and hazel. At this time, deciduous trees were beginning to give way to conifers and beech was no longer the main tree. Plant remains from sediments at Tröllatunga and at Húsavíkurkleif in Steingrímsfjörður and in Hólmatindur at Reyðarfjörður are 10-9 million years old. Ferns, willow, maple, magnolia, birch, walnut and hickory appear to have been dominant in lowland vegetation at this time. In Hrútagil in Mókollsdalur in Strandasýsla there are 9-8 million years old vegetation remnants, where beech seems to have been common again, but also found is maple, birch, alder, elm, Pterocarya (wingnuts) and hazel.

==== Cold temperate climate ====
Fossilized plant remains in the vicinity of lake Hreðavatn are estimated to be 7-6 million years old, where birch, willow and conifers have prevailed rather than warmer climate species. The climate was cooling on the upper part of the Miocene, as the remains of Hreðavatn show. Remains in Sleggjulækur in Borgarfjörður, which indicate further cooling, are probably about 3.5 million years old. Birch, willow and grass became more and more prominent at the same time as the forest cover was diminishing.

==== Ice Age climate ====
About 2.6 million years ago, glacial sediments formed in Borgarfjörður suggesting further cooling. In the sediment layers in Breiðuvík in Tjörnes, plant remains are found at the bottom of the layers. These are about two million years old pollen from pine, alder, birch and grasses. Thus the forest had mostly disappeared at this time and been replaced by shrubland along with conifers and alder. During later ice age periods, birch appears to have been the only forest tree and vegetation similar to what is now. In Bakkabrún in Víðidalur in Vestur-Húnavatnssýsla, about 70m thick sediments have been found, which are estimated to be about 1.7 million years old. In the sediments there are marks left by foliage of birch, willow, alder and heather. In Stöð in the northern part of Snæfellsnes peninsula there has also been found to similar vegetation remains, though younger, about 1.1 million years old. In 120 meters thick sediments on Svínafellsfjall in Öræfi there are sediments where marks from alder leaves are abundant. The remains are thought to be about 800,000 years old. In Elliðavogur near Reykjavík, there is a layer of 20 cm thick carbonized vegetation on top of a tillite layer, but the remains are just below the Reykjavik dolerite. In these layers, probably from the late ice age, seeds and fruits of various existing endemic plant species have been found along with pollen from birch, willow and other plants. The vegetation in the ice age gradually shifted to the current state. Of the 440 species of vascular plants currently living in Iceland, 97% are thought to be European in origin, only about 10 species are of American origin.

== Terrestrial and fresh water animal fossils ==
Remains of terrestrial and freshwater animals are rarely found among the layers of Icelandic basalt plateau formations, as the sediments are poor in calcium and thus the remains dissolve quickly. No non-avian Dinosaurs have ever been found in Iceland because Iceland wasn't formed until after their extinction. Iceland therefore has rocks of the wrong age to provide them.

=== Fresh water animals ===
Of freshwater animals, tiny choanoflagellates and needles from small sponges have been found in the lignite in Brjánslækur. Remains of water fleas have been found in Mókollsdalur and Langavatnsdalur. In a gorge above Illugastaðir in Fnjóskadalur, parts of bivalve molluscs were found which probably lived in fresh water since there is residue of plants and diatoms in the sediment.

=== Terrestrial animals ===
The remains of terrestrial animals have rarely been found in Icelandic strata.

==== Terrestrial insects ====
Remnants of beetles have been found in the lignite at Brjánslækur and scale insects have been described from sediments at Tröllatunga in Steingrímsfjörður. In Hrútagili, in the Mokollsdalur valley, well-preserved Chironomidae and aphids have been found. This aphid is of the species Longistigma caryae, the giant bark aphid. This aphid now lives in the eastern North American deciduous belt. This is the oldest specimen of this species ever found.

==== Fossilized deer bones ====
The remains of a deer were found in Þuríðargil in Hofsárdalur in Vopnarfjörður. The remains were found in a red siltstone layer about 330 meters above sea level. There, bone remnants were found from a young animal's shoulder area and parts of the scapula can be identified. The age of the sediment is 3.5-3 million years and therefore older than the ice age. It is clear, therefore, that animals and plants became isolated in Iceland after it became an island.

==== Holocene remains ====
The only terrestrial remains that have been found from the Holocene are insects and freshwater crabs found in sedimentary beds in Elliðavogur near Reykjavík. Little of terrestrial remains have been discovered since last glaciation. However, a molar from a polar bear was found in about 13,000 years old sedimentary strata at Röndin near Kópasker. Footprints by an aquatic bird have been found at Ellidaár river near Reykjavik and a bone from a common eider in marine sedimentary strata in Melabakkar in Melasveit.

== Marine animal remains ==
The remains of marine animals that once lived on the shores of Iceland have widely been discovered. Most are molluscs, but the remains of fish and marine mammals have been found. For example, walrus bones have been found in the area from Faxaflói to Hunaflói; skulls, teeth, ribs and baculum.

=== Tjörnes sediments ===
At Tjörnes peninsula are abundance of marine sediments older than the Ice Age (the oldest about 5 million years) and the total thickness of these layers is no less than 500 meters. In these layers remains of different marine animal communities have been discovered and nowhere else have more species of marine animals been found in Icelandic sediments. The molluscs, crustaceans and forams are most common, but there are also remains of fish and marine mammals, that is seals, walrus and whales. The layers can be divided into three belts by which type of shell is the most dominant in each layer. The lowest and oldest is the Venerupis zone or Tapes zone, in the middle is the Mactra zone and at the top and youngest is the Serripes zone.

==== Venerupis zone ====
Three types of Venerupis shells (carpet shells) have been found in the zone and one of them now lives no further north than the North Sea.

==== Mactra zone ====
The Mactra shells found in this zone are now extinct. Species found in the Venerupis and Mactra zones are the same as found in other similarly aged sediments found elsewhere in the North Atlantic. However, many of them live in warmer seas than the prevalent sea temperatures of the Icelandic coast.

==== Serripes zone ====
At the bottom of the Serripes zone, the fauna changes with the arrival of species previously unknown in the area. These include common whelk, Neptunea despecta, Serripes, Macoma calcarea and the wrinkled rock-borer (Hiatella arctica), but these species are now among the most common species of shellfish in Iceland. Around 80 species of molluscs, mainly snail and bivalve species, have been found at the Serripes zone. In Breiðuvík in Tjörnes, about 125 meters wide sedimentary layers are formed in part by a marine sediment containing the remains of marine animals, especially forams, crustaceans and molluscs.

=== Xenolith fossils ===
In Mýrdalur in Vestur-Skaftafellssýsla, small rocks of silt or sandstone with shellfish remains have been found here and there among the volcanic tuff. Similar xenoliths have been found in the tuff of Surtsey and Heimaey. During eruptions these xenoliths were dislodged from eruption channels and ejected with the rest of the volcanic debris.

=== Búlandshöfði ===
On the northern side of Snæfellsnes from Kirkjufell west to Skarðslækur there are traces of up to 50 meters thick sediments. In these strata at cape Búlandshöfði there have been found cold-sea species such as Portlandia arctica, Leda pernula, the wrinkled rock-borer (Hiatella arctica), Tridonta montagui and Tachyrhynchus erosus (eroded turretsnail). At the bottom of the layers at Búlandshöfði, however, there are warm-sea species such as mussels, Arctica islandica (ocean quahog) and common periwinkle. Most of the evidence suggests that the strata at Búlandshöfði was formed at the end of a glacial period and at the beginning of the following warm period. Age analysis of the layers indicates that oldest ones are about 1.1 million years old.

=== Ice age strata in Reykjavik and Seltjarnarnes ===
In Háubakkar in Elliðavogur near Reykjavík, there are sediments underneath the Reykjavik dolerite which includes shells; Ennucula tenuis, Macoma calcarea and Mya truncata. Sediments can be found in Setjarnarnes and in the northern part of Fossvogur which contain the remains of marine fauna; forams, snails, bivalves and crustaceans. These layers have formed in the sea at the end of the last glacial period.

=== Dog whelk layers ===
Remains from a time in the current warm period when the sea level was higher are called the Dog whelk layers (Nákuðungslögin), seen especially in Hunaflói and Eyrarbakki and Stokkseyri. The layers contain typical coastal fauna with dog whelk (Nucella lapillus) and periwinkles most prominent.
