= 2000 Iceland earthquakes =

- Location within Iceland
- UTC time: 2000-06-17 15:40:41
- 2000-06-21 00:51:46
- ISC event: 1736604
- 1736730
- USGS-ANSS: ComCat
- ComCat
- Local date: 17 June 2000
- 21 June 2000
- Local time: 15:40 GMT (UTC+0)
- 00:51 GMT (UTC+0)
- Magnitude: 6.5 M_{wc}
- 6.5 M_{wc}
- Depth: 10 km (6.2 mi)
- Epicenter: 63.980°N 20.758°W
- Fault: Árnes Fault; Hestfjall Fault
- Areas affected: Southern Region, Iceland
- Total damage: US$20 million ($36.6 million in 2024, adjusted for inflation)
- Max. intensity: MMI IX (Violent)
- Peak acceleration: 0.85 g
- Casualties: Several injured

Two earthquakes, both measuring M_{w} 6.5, struck southern Iceland near the town of Selfoss on 17 and 21 June 2000. There were no fatalities but were multiple minor injuries and considerable damage to infrastructure. The two earthquakes were the first major seismic activity in Iceland in 88 years.

== Tectonic setting ==
Iceland lies on the spreading axis of the Mid-Atlantic Ridge (MAR) where it is influenced by the Iceland hotspot, a major mantle upwelling. The active spreading axis of the MAR is moving westward with respect to the hotspot. This means that the active rifts above the hotspot have progressively jumped towards the east, causing the development of two major transform zones in the north and south of the island. To the south the zone is the South Iceland Seismic Zone (SISZ), which has a west–east trend and is about 20 km wide. Most earthquakes in this zone are associated with movement on north–south trending right lateral strike-slip faults, although there is also evidence of WSW–ENE trending faults.

According to historical records, there have been 33 damaging earthquakes in the SISZ from the 11th century up to June 2000, with the latest being in 1896 and 1912.

== Earthquakes ==
The first of the earthquakes occurred at 15:40 UTC on 17 June at a depth of 6.3 km. The magnitude estimated by the Icelandic Meteorological Office was 6.4 M_{w}, assuming a single fault, although such a model did not fit all the available data. The extent of aftershocks defined a 16 km long north–south fault rupture, continuing down to 10 km. The causative fault was the Árnes Fault and a large number of surface fissures were mapped along this structure in the days following the event. It also had a peak ground acceleration of 0.64 g.

The second earthquake occurred at 00:51 UTC on 21 June at a depth of 5.1 km. The extent of aftershocks defined an 18 km fault rupture down to 8 km depth. The causative fault was the Hestfjall Fault. Surface fissures were developed over a distance of about 25 km. A peak ground acceleration of 0.85 g was calculated for the second quake, based on damage to a bridge crossing the Þjórsá river.

== Impact ==
Severe damage from both quakes occurred to a combined area of about 800 km^{2} (310 mi^{2}), stretching from Landssveit and Holta to Rangárvellir. Most of the affected buildings were of poor quality, being built on unstable foundations. The greatest damage occurred to farms, summer cottages and utility and communication systems. Six Landsvirkjun high-voltage masts were affected in the earthquakes when guy-wires and foundations subsided by up to 30 cm (0.98 ft), with repairs lasting until 22 June.

The first earthquake resulted in one injury and the closure of some roads at Vestmannaeyjar. In Hella, 11 houses were destroyed, 19 others and a glass factory were damaged and utilities were disrupted. Overall, the first earthquake resulted in US$20 million worth of damage. The second earthquake caused several minor injuries, destroyed 12 homes and severely damaged 24 others in the Grímsnes region, and damaged water pipes in the Selfoss-Eyrarbakki-Stokkseyri area.

== See also ==
- Geology of Iceland
- 2008 Iceland earthquake
- List of earthquakes in 2000
- List of earthquakes in Iceland
