= 1906 in Iceland =

- Decades: 1880s; 1890s; 1900s; 1910s; 1920s
- See also: Other events in 1906 · Timeline of Icelandic history

Events in the year 1906 in Iceland.

== Incumbents ==
- Monarch: Christian IX (until 29 January 1906); Frederick VIII onwards
- Prime Minister: Hannes Þórður Pétursson Hafstein

== Events ==
- A submarine telegraph cable was laid by the Great Northern Telegraph Co. from Scotland through the Faroe Islands to Iceland, where it came ashore on the east coast at Seyðisfjörður. In conjunction a telegraph and telephone line, was laid from the landing point to the capital city Reykjavík. This established Síminn (originally Landssími Íslands).
- Þorvaldur Thoroddsen published a map of Iceland based on his own research.

Þorvaldur Thoroddsen's 1901 map of Iceland.
