= Bifröst (town) =

- Village
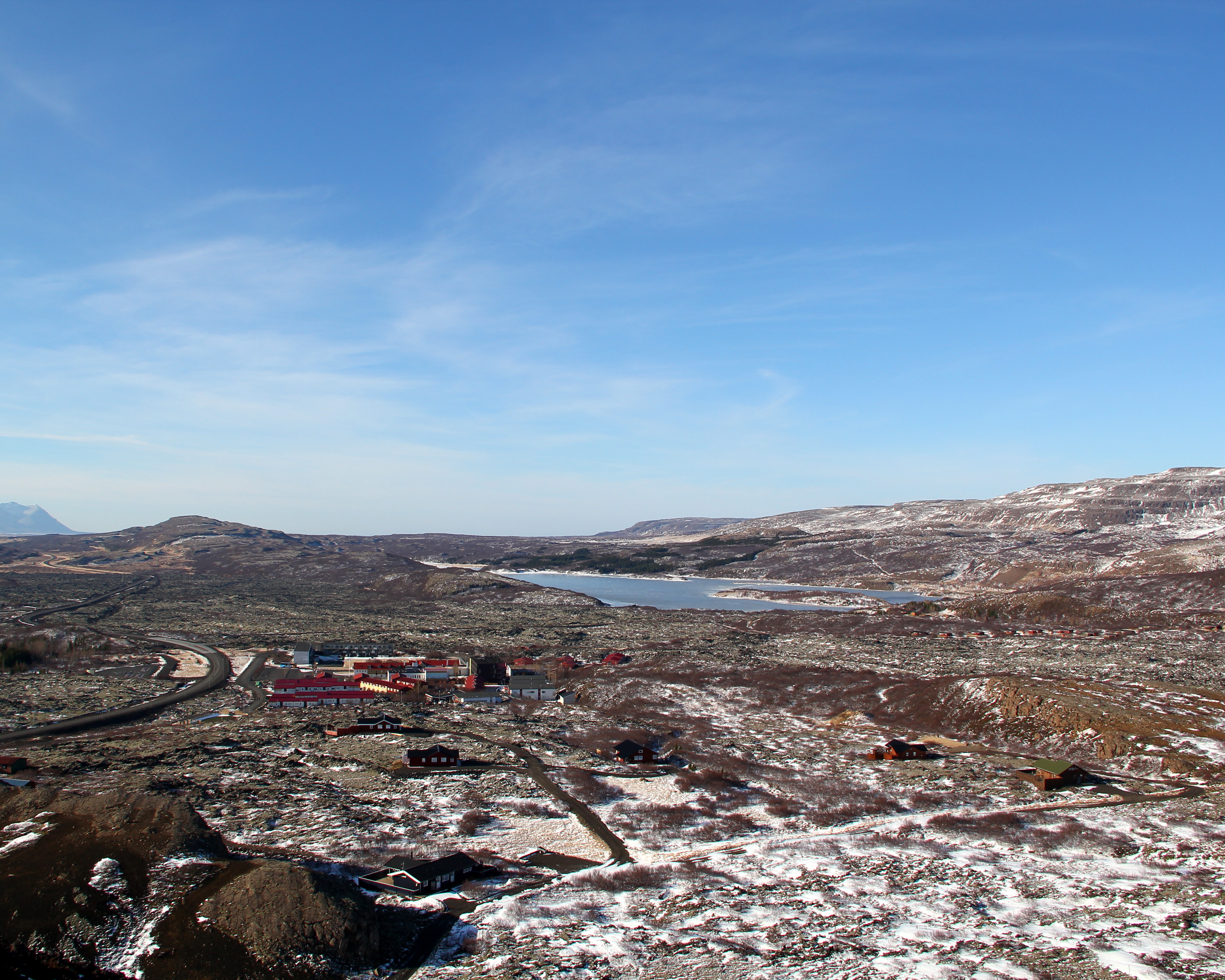
- Bifröst village and university, seen from the rim of the crater Stóra Grábrók. Route 1 passes to the east (left), while the lake Hreðavatn is southwest of the village.

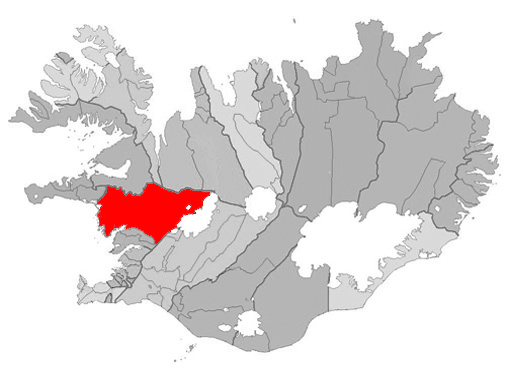
- Location of the Municipality of Borgarbyggð

- Location of Bifröst in Iceland
- Coordinates: 64°45′59″N 21°33′9″W
- Country: Iceland
- Constituency: Northwest Constituency
- Region: Western Region
- Municipality: Borgarbyggð

Population (2014)
  - Total: 251
- Time zone: UTC+0 (GMT)

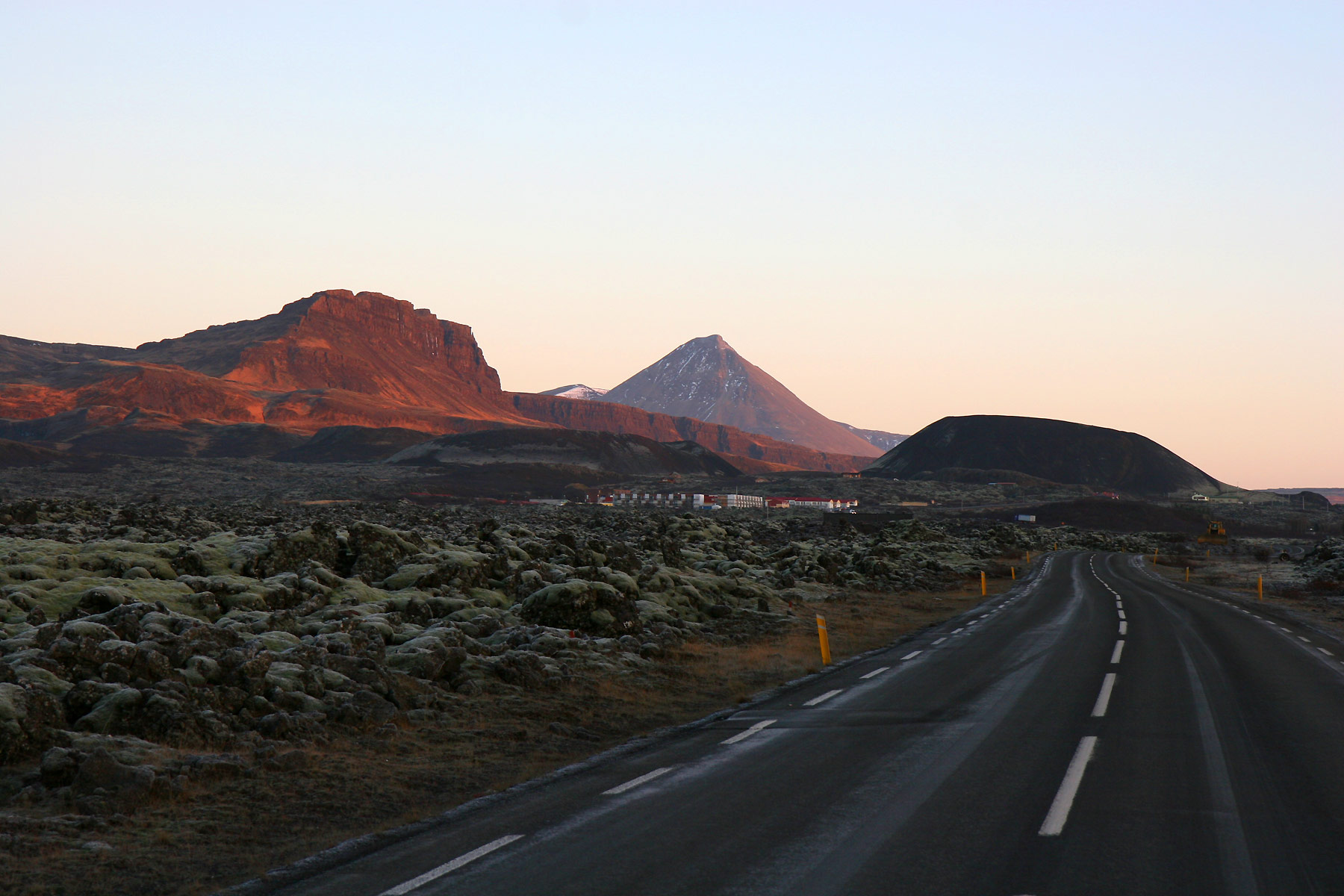
Town of Bifröst surrounded by the Grábrókarhraun lavafield.

Bifröst (Icelandic pronunciation: [ˈpɪvˌrœst]) is a small settlement in western Iceland, in the Mýrasýsla county.

It is located in the Northwest political constituency and is the site of Bifröst University, a small private campus university. In the town of Bifröst there is a convenience store called Samkaup strax, a coffee house, a kindergarten and a gym among other things.

== Grábrókarhraun ==
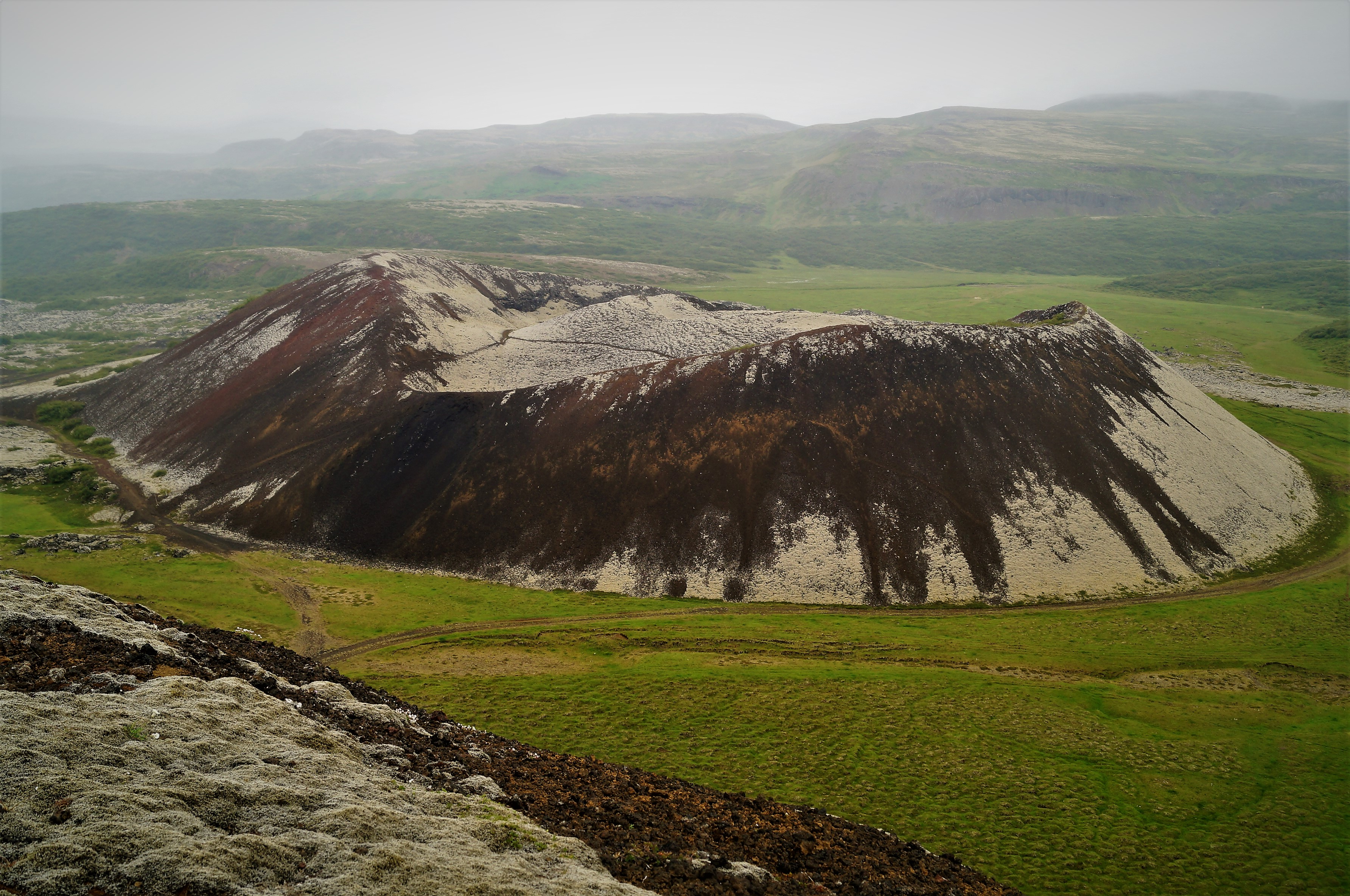
Grábrókarfell, seen from Stóra-Grábrók

Bifröst is surrounded by a 3,000-year-old ʻaʻā lava (or apalhraun) field, Grábrókarhraun [ˈkrauːˌprouːkar̥ˌr̥œyːn], which has been overgrown with moss and heather. It is part of the around 90 km long volcanic system of Ljósufjöll. Just behind the university campus are some craters which produced the lava field, the biggest one is called Grábrók (Stóra Grábrók [ˈstouːra ˈkrauːˌprouːk]) and the one beside it Grábrókarfell [ˈkrauːˌprouːkarˌfɛtl̥].

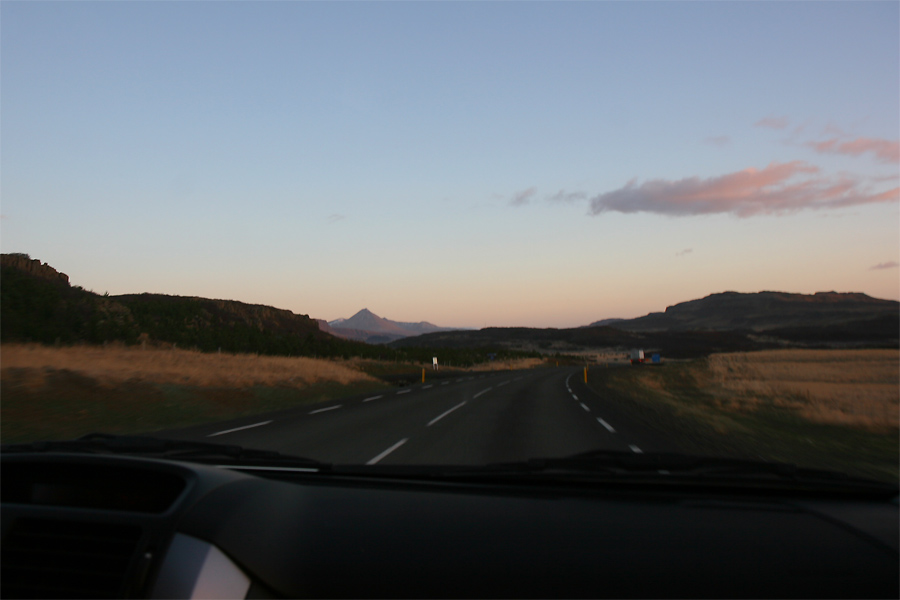
Heath and forest land south of Bifröst

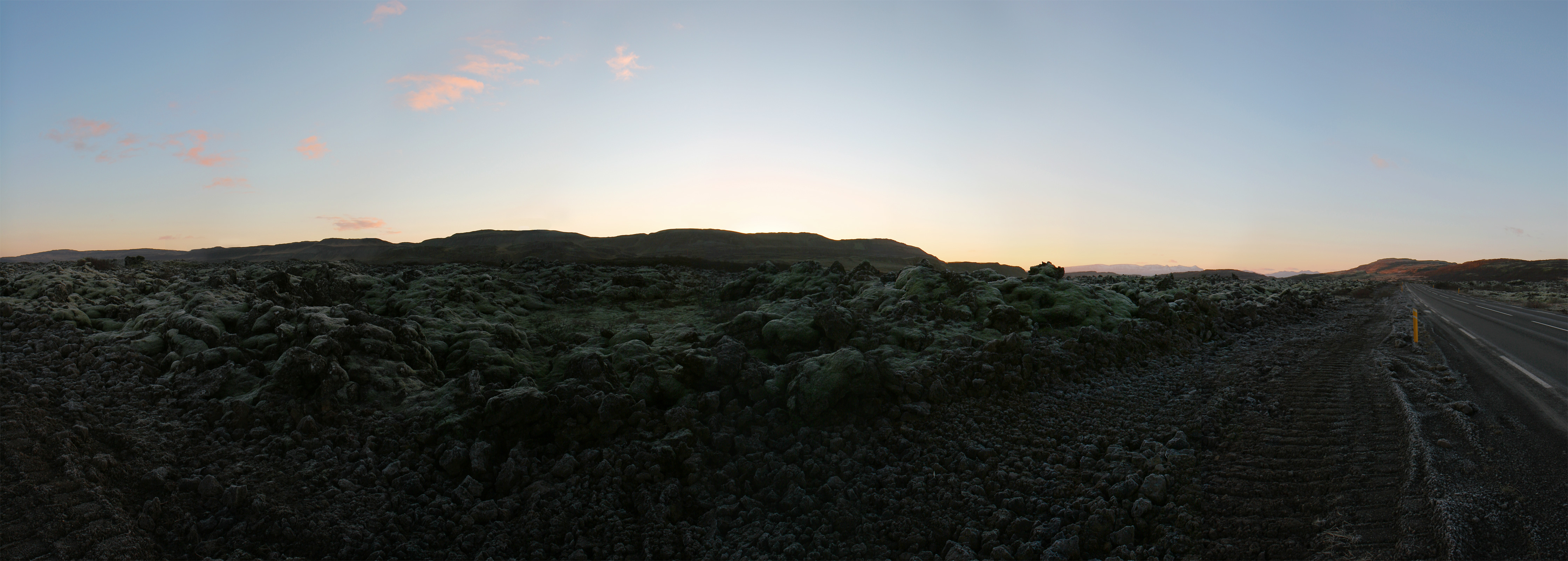
Panorama of Grábrókarhraun at dawn, November 2007

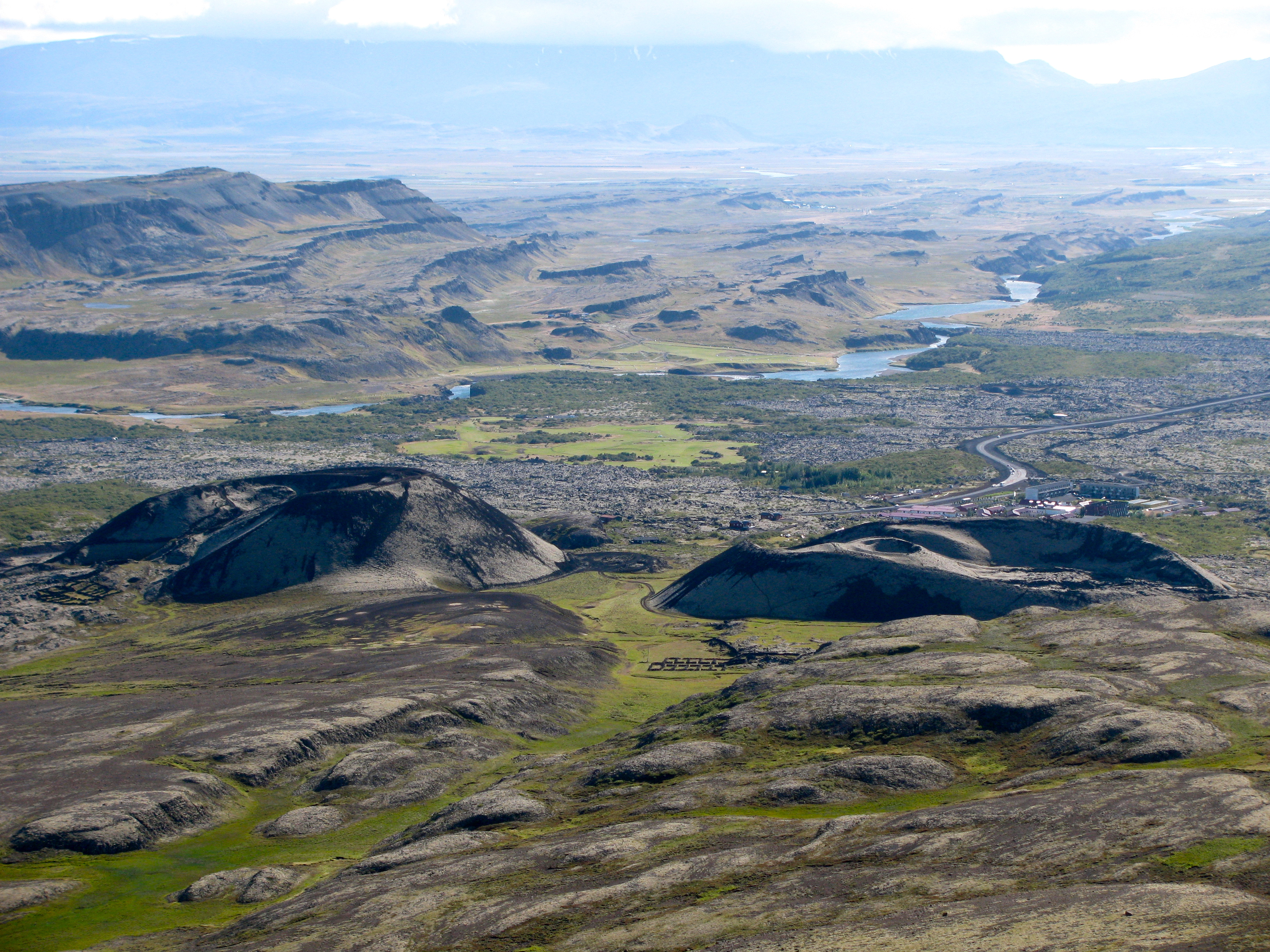
Grábrók and Grábrókarfell
