= Hreðavatn =

Lake in Iceland

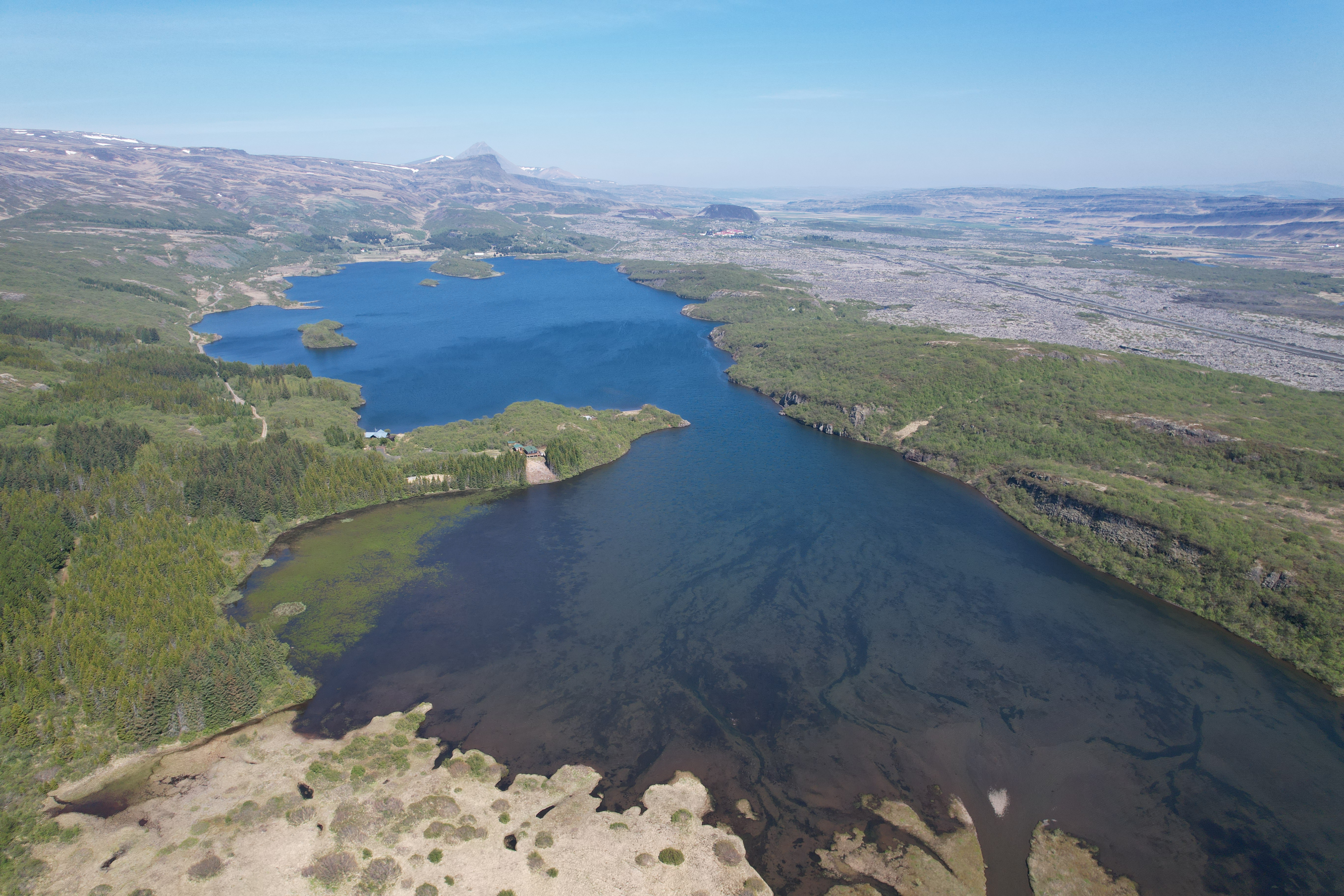
- Hreðavatn seen from the air with Bifröst and Grábrók craters in the background

- Location within Iceland
- Coordinates: 64°45′N 21°36′W
- Basin countries: Iceland
- Max. length: 5 km (3.1 mi)
- Surface area: 1.14 km^{2} (0.44 sq mi)
- Max. depth: 20 m (66 ft)
- Surface elevation: 56 m (184 ft)

Hreðavatn (Icelandic pronunciation: [ˈr̥ɛːðaˌvahtn̥]) is a lake in the west of Iceland. It is situated near Route 1 (the Ring Road) between Borgarnes and the pass of Holtavörtuheiði. Nearby is the university faculty of the Bifröst University and the Grábrók craters as well as the mountain Baula.

The surface of the lake is 1.14 km^{2}, it lies 56 m above sea level, its length is about 5 km and its greatest depth 20 m. It is embedded in a scenic landscape of heath and small forest plantations.

== See also ==
- List of lakes of Iceland
