= 1904 in Iceland =

- Decades: 1880s; 1890s; 1900s; 1910s; 1920s
- See also: Other events in 1904 · Timeline of Icelandic history

Events in the year 1904 in Iceland.

== Incumbents ==
- Monarch: Christian IX
- Prime Minister: Hannes Þórður Pétursson Hafstein

== Events ==
- The position of Prime Minister of Iceland is established with Hannes Þórður Pétursson Hafstein of the Home Rule Party taking the position on 1 February.
- The oldest building at the Akureyri Junior College is constructed.

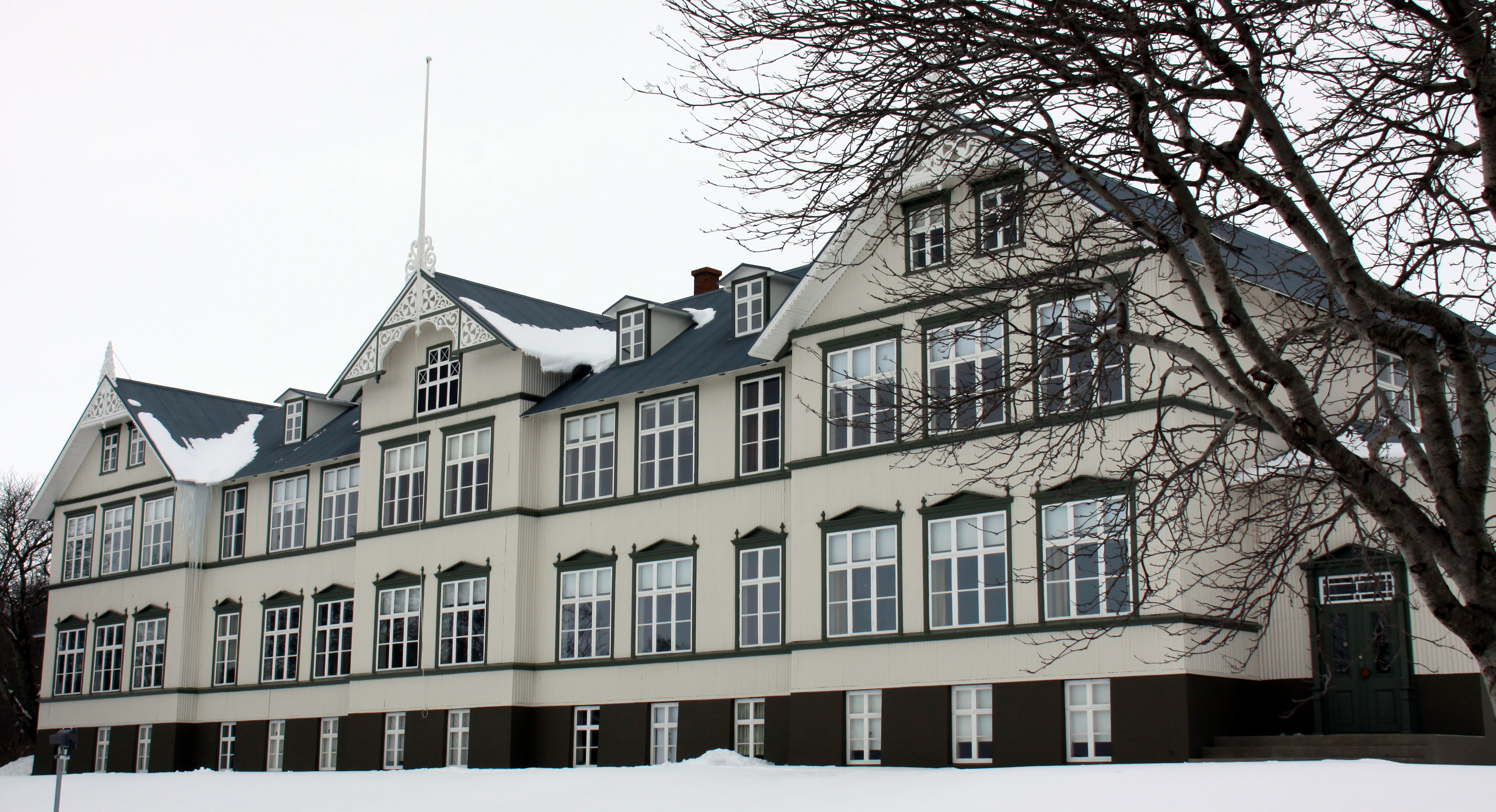
The oldest school building at Akureyri Junior College constructed in 1904.
