= Bifrost Volume 1: Faerie =

Bifrost Volume 1: Faerie is a 1977 role-playing game supplement published by Skytrex Ltd. for Bifrost.

== Contents ==
Bifrost Volume 1: Faerie is a supplement in which the initial version of the rules for character creation and background includes comprehensive guidelines on determining character abilities, alignment, and the influence of deities. It also details social positions for characters and rules regarding fatigue. Additionally, it provides extensive guidelines for handling encounters, complete with numerous monster tables.

== Publication history ==
Bifrost Volume 1: Faerie was written by G. Highley, K. White, S. Johnson, and K. Minear, and was published by Skytrex Ltd. (U.K) in 1977 as a 76-page book.

== Reception ==
Don Turnbull reviewed Faerie, volume 1 of Bifrost, for White Dwarf #7 (June/July 1978). Turnbull noted that the game cannot be played without all three volumes, "a marked disadvantage if the three volumes are not all published at the same time". He felt that the presentation was good, but noted that "such care in presentation was not matched by care in proof-reading - indeed it is easy to believe that there was no proof-reading at all. There are many printer's errors in the text [...] there are too many to list here". He considered the first volume "an impressive production" and concluded that it was a "promising start but the publishers should perhaps have had more confidence in their authors and should have been less slaphappy in the production - there is no excuse at all for such obvious errors".
