= 1908 in Iceland =

- Decades: 1880s; 1890s; 1900s; 1910s; 1920s
- See also: Other events in 1908 · Timeline of Icelandic history

The following lists events in 1908 in Iceland.

== Incumbents ==
- Monarch: Frederik VIII
- Prime Minister – Hannes Hafstein

== Events ==
- 21 April – Knattspyrnufélagið Víkingur is established.
- 1 May – Knattspyrnufélagið Fram is established.
- 10 September –
  - The 1908 Icelandic parliamentary election
  - At the 1908 Icelandic prohibition referendum, a ban on importing alcohol is approved by 60.1% of voters.
- Þórhallur Bjarnarson became the sixth Bishop of Iceland, succeeding Hallgrímur Sveinsson in the position.

== Births ==
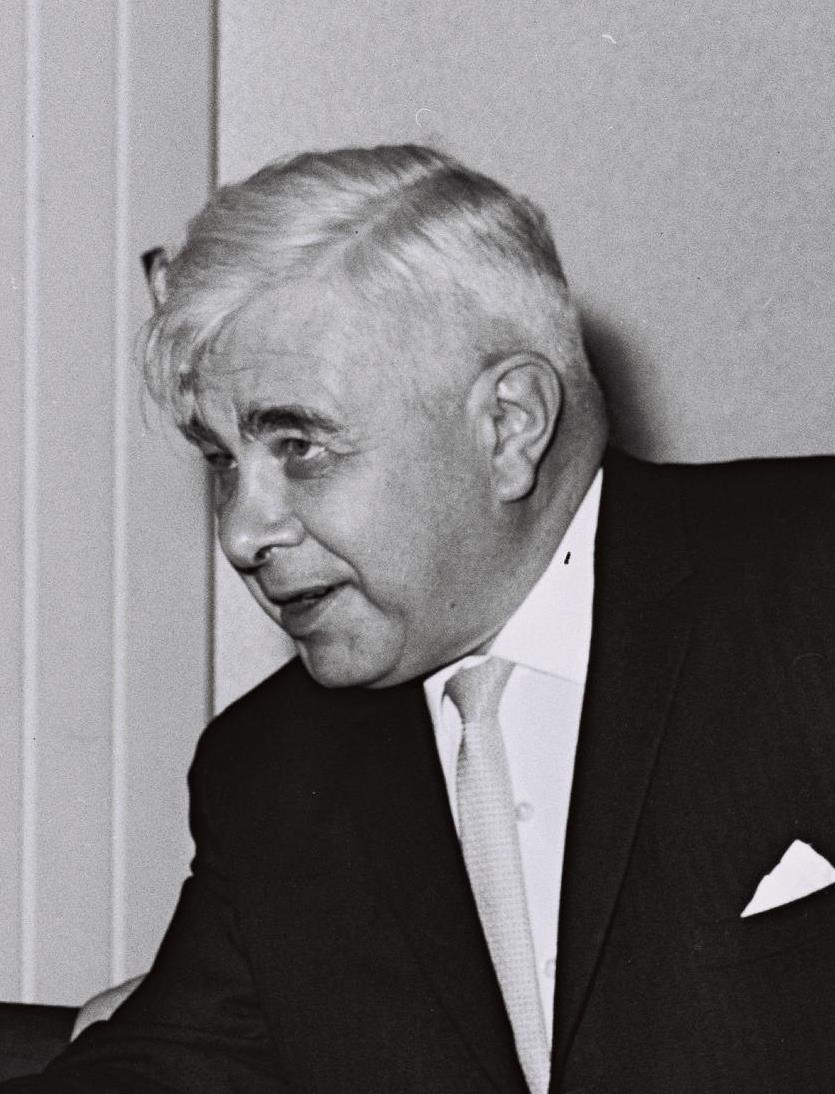
Bjarni Benediktsson

- 30 April – Bjarni Benediktsson, politician (d. 1970).
- 13 October – Steinn Steinarr, poet (d. 1958)
