= 1914 in Iceland =

- Decades: 1890s; 1900s; 1910s; 1920s; 1930s
- See also: Other events in 1914 · Timeline of Icelandic history

The following lists events in 1914 in Iceland.

== Incumbents ==
- Monarch: Christian X
- Prime Minister – Hannes Hafstein (until 21 July), Sigurður Eggerz (from 21 July)

== Events ==
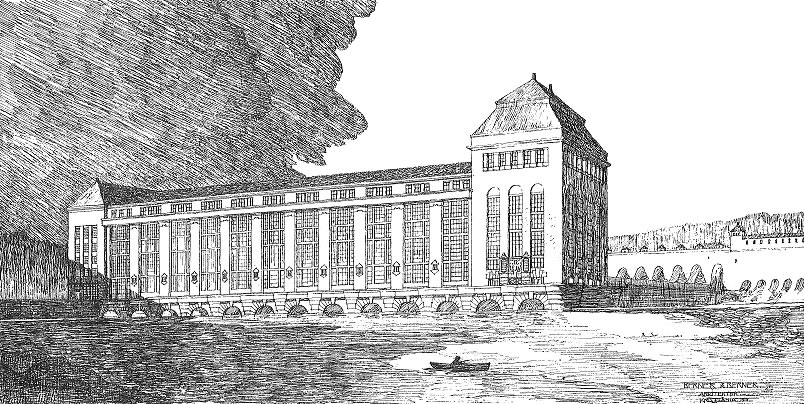
1918 drawing by Gottfred Sætersmoen showing Fossafélagið Títan's proposed power plant Urriðafossvirkjun near the Þjórsá river

- Eimskip was founded.
- Fossafélagið Títan was founded.
- Statistics Iceland was formed.

== Births ==
- 22 April – Sigurður Sigurðsson, athlete (d. 1982).
- 16 June – Lúðvík Jósepsson, politician (d. 1994).
- 2 July – Sveinn Ingvarsson, sprinter (d. 2009).
- 19 August – Baldur Möller, chess player (d. 1999).
- 20 September – Vilhjálmur Hjálmarsson, politician (d. 2014).
- 7 October – Hermann Hermannsson, footballer (d. 1975)

== Deaths ==
- 3 June – Jón Bjarnason, Lutheran minister (b. 1845)

=== Full date missing ===
- Þorsteinn Erlingsson, poet (b. 1858).
