= 1907 in Iceland =

- Decades: 1880s; 1890s; 1900s; 1910s; 1920s
- See also: Other events in 1906 · Timeline of Icelandic history

Events in the year 1907 in Iceland.

== Incumbents ==
- Monarch: Frederik VIII
- Prime Minister: Hannes Þórður Pétursson Hafstein

== Events ==
- 11 March - The Íþróttafélag Reykjavíkur is established
- 1 April - Ungmennafélag Bolungarvíkur is established
- The Tindastóll men's football team is established
- Ungmennafélagið Tindastóll is established
- Húsavíkurkirkja is constructed in Húsavík
- Milljónarfélagið is established in Viðey
- Frederic VIII of Denmark visits Iceland during the summer.
- The women's suffrage organisation, the Icelandic Women's Rights Association is founded by Bríet Bjarnhéðinsdóttir.

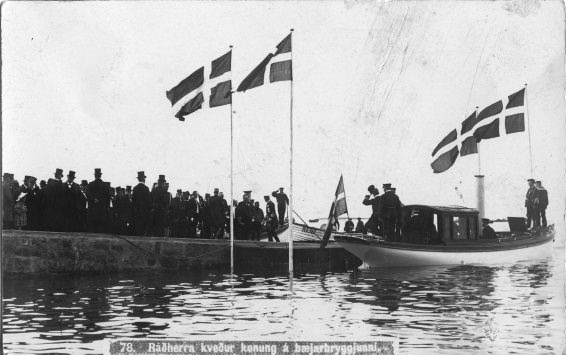
King Frederik VIII of Denmark visits Iceland in 1907.
