= Ísafold =

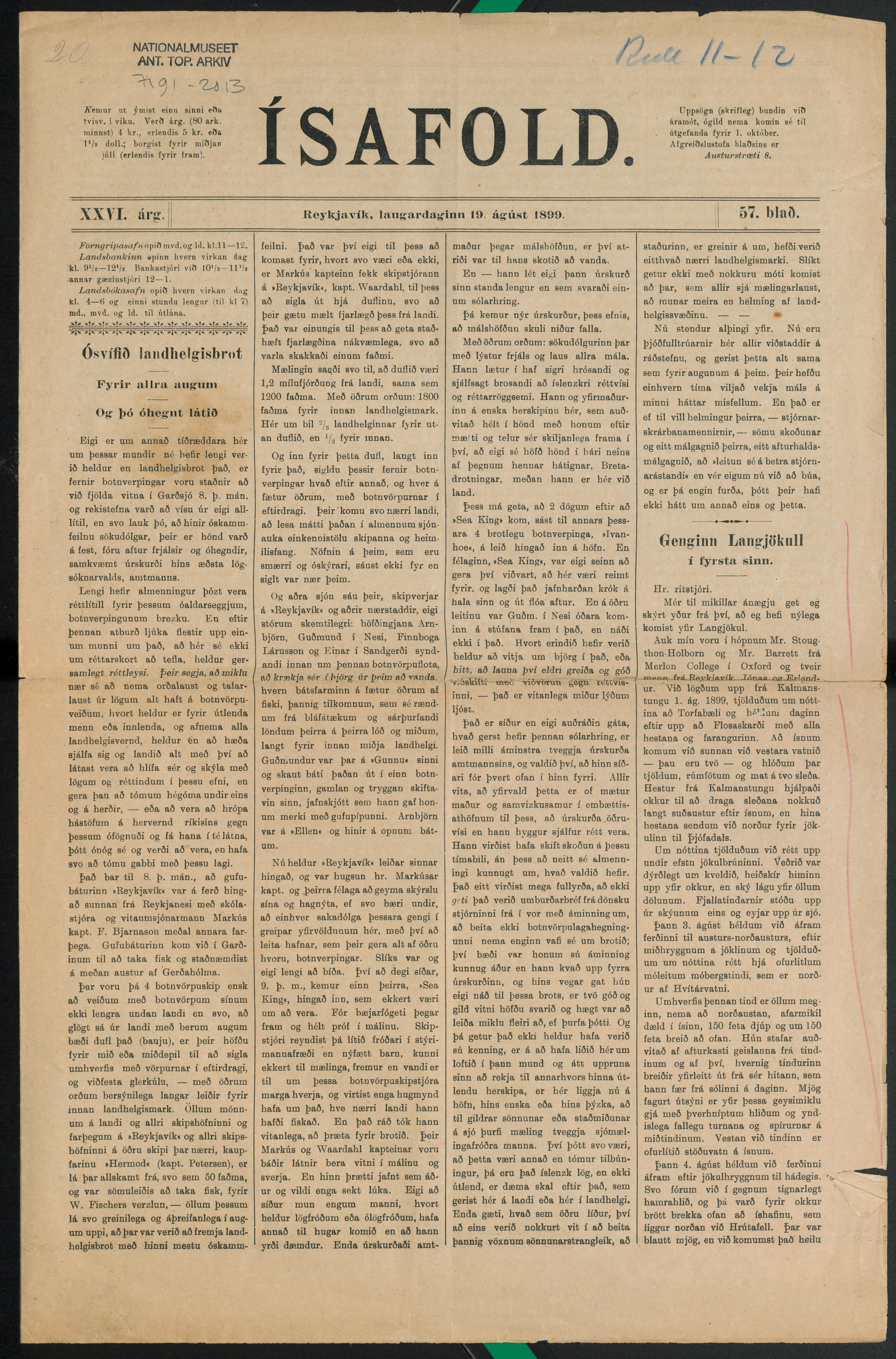
Ísafold

Ísafold was an Icelandic newspaper, published weekly. It was founded in 1874 by the politician Björn Jónsson, who was the editor until 1909, when he became prime minister.

Ísafold was published until 1929, when it merged with Morgunblaðið.
