= Geology of Iceland =

Map showing the Mid-Atlantic Ridge splitting Iceland and separating the North American and Eurasian Plates, with locations of some of Iceland's active volcanoes (red triangles).

The geology of Iceland is unique and so of particular interest to geologists. Iceland lies on the divergent boundary between the Eurasian plate and the North American plate. It also lies above a hotspot, the Iceland plume. The plume is believed to have caused the formation of Iceland itself, the island first appearing over the ocean surface about 16 to 18 million years ago. The result is an island characterized by repeated volcanism and geothermal phenomena such as geysers.

The eruption of Laki in 1783 caused much devastation and loss of life, leading to a famine that killed about 25% of the island's population and resulted in a drop in global temperatures, as sulfur dioxide was spewed into the Northern Hemisphere. This caused crop failures in Europe and may have caused droughts in India. The eruption has been estimated to have killed over six million people globally.

Between 1963 and 1967, the new island of Surtsey was created off the southwest coast by a volcanic eruption.

== Geologic history ==
=== The opening of the North Atlantic and the origin of Iceland ===
Iceland is located above the Mid-Atlantic Ridge. Some scientists believe the hotspot beneath Iceland could have contributed to the rifting of the supercontinent Pangaea and the subsequent formation of the North Atlantic Ocean. Igneous rocks which arose from this hotspot have been found on both sides of the Mid-Atlantic Ridge, which originated 57–53 million years ago ("Ma"), around the time North America and Eurasia separated and sea floor spreading began in the Northeast Atlantic. Geologists can determine plate motion relative to the Icelandic hotspot by examining igneous rocks throughout the Northern Atlantic region. This is possible because certain rocks attributable to hotspot volcanism can be interpreted as volcanic traces left by the Iceland hotspot. By assuming that the hotspot is stationary, geologists use what is called the "hotspot frame of reference" to gather plate motion estimates and to create maps of plate movement on the surface of the Earth relative to a stationary hotspot.

Most researchers of plate motion agree that the Iceland hotspot was probably located beneath Greenland for a period of time. As the North Atlantic Ocean continued to spread apart, Greenland was located to the southeast of the Iceland hotspot and likely moved over it 70–40 Ma. Some research using new plate motion data gathered from hotspot reference frames from around the world suggests that the Iceland hotspot's path differs from that estimated from older investigations. Many older rocks (dated 75–70 Ma) located throughout the area to the west are not only located near hypothesized Iceland hotspot paths but are also attributable to hotspot volcanism. This implies that the Iceland hotspot may be much older than the earliest rifting of what is now the northernmost Northeast Atlantic. If this is true, then much of the rifting in the North Atlantic was likely caused by thinning and bulging of the crust as opposed to the more direct influence of the mantle plume which sustains the Iceland hotspot.

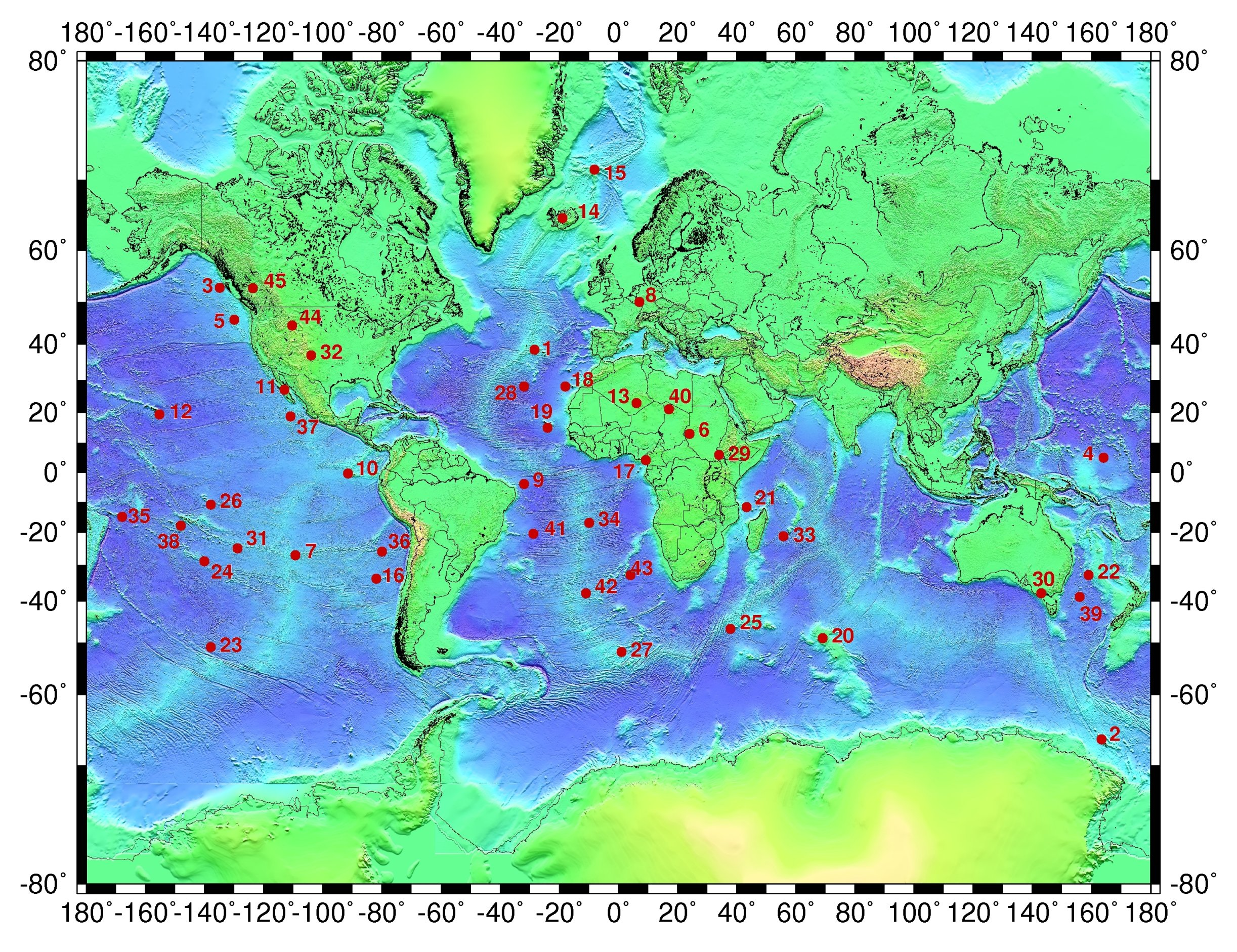
Map of hotspots. Iceland is number 14.

In other scientific work on the path of the Iceland hotspot, no such westward track toward Canada (where the aforementioned older igneous rocks exist) can be detected, which implies that the older igneous rocks found in the Northern Atlantic may not have originated from the hotspot. Although the exact path of the Iceland hotspot is debated, a preponderance of geophysical evidence, such as the geothermal heat flux over Greenland, shows that the hotspot likely moved below Greenland around 80–50 Ma.

Around 60–50 Ma, when the hotspot was located near the eastern coast of Greenland and the Mid-Atlantic Ridge, volcanism, perhaps generated by the Iceland hotspot, connected the Eurasian and North American continents and formed a land bridge between the continents while they spread apart. This feature is known as the Greenland Scotland Transverse Ridge, and it now lies below sea level. About 36 Ma, the Iceland hotspot was fully in contact with the oceanic crust and possibly fed segments of the Mid-Atlantic Ridge which continued to form the oldest rocks located directly to the east and west of modern-day Iceland. The oldest sub-aerial rocks in modern-day Iceland are from 16.5 Ma.

Although most scientists believe Iceland is both in contact with a mantle plume, and being actively split apart by the Mid-Atlantic Ridge, some other seismological and geophysical evidence calls the previously discussed mantle plume/hotspot assumption into question. Some geologists believe there is not enough definitive evidence to suggest a mantle plume exists beneath Iceland because sea floor heat flow through the lithosphere surrounding Iceland does not deviate from normal oceanic lithosphere heat flow that is uninfluenced by a plume. This cold crust hypothesis directly opposes the idea that Iceland is located above a hot mantle plume. Additional evidence indicates that seismic waves created under Iceland do not behave as expected based on other seismic surveys near hypothesized mantle plumes. As it is one of the only places where sea floor spreading can be observed on land, and where there is evidence for a mantle plume, the geological history of Iceland will likely remain a popular area of research.

=== Glaciations ===
- Glacier extent
- Nunataks and ice free areas
- Interglacials
- Tuyas and subglacial volcanism

=== Holocene changes and volcanism ===
Map of active Holocene volcanic systems in Iceland. Legend: Other shading shows: calderas; central volcanoes; fissure swarms; subglacial terrain above 1,100 m (3,600 ft); seismically active areas; Clicking on the rectangle in the image enlarges to full window and enables mouse-over with more detail.

- Revegetation
- Increased volcanism
- Soil formation
- Isostatic rebound
- Holocene sediments
- Coastal erosion

== Rock types ==
=== Volcanic deposits ===
- Tholeiitic volcanic series
- Alkalic volcanic series
- Hyaloclastite
- Tephras and ash

=== Intrusive rocks ===
- Dikes
- Sills
- Plutons

=== Sedimentary deposits ===
One of the rare examples of sedimentary rocks in Iceland is the sequence of marine and non-marine sediments present on the Tjörnes Peninsula in northern Iceland. These Pliocene and late Pleistocene deposits are composed of silt and sandstones, with fossils preserved in the lower layers. The primary fossil types found in the Tjörnes beds are marine mollusk shells and plant remains (lignite).

- Vegetational changes
- Past climate
- Origin of the strata
- Fossil preservation

== Active tectonics ==
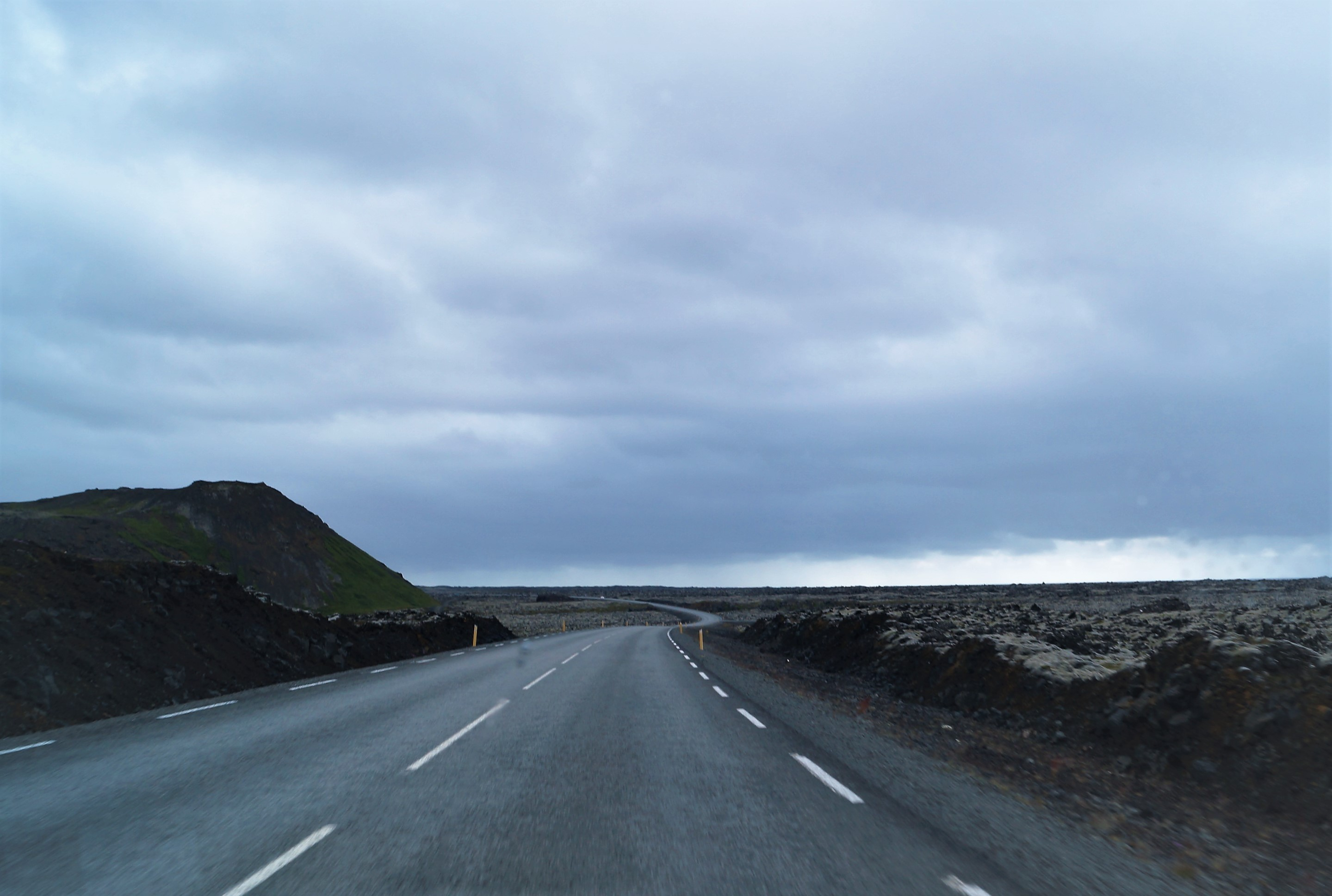
Ögmundarhraun lava field, Road 427, Reykjanes Peninsula

The tectonic structure of Iceland is characterized by various seismically and volcanically active centers. Iceland is bordered to the south by the Reykjanes Ridge segment of the Mid-Atlantic Ridge and to the north by the Kolbeinsey Ridge. Rifting in the southern part of Iceland is focused in two main parallel rift zones. The Reykjanes Peninsula Rift in SW Iceland is the landward continuation of the Reykjanes Ridge that connects to the Western Volcanic Zone (WVZ). The more active Eastern Volcanic Zone (EVZ) represents a rift jump, although it is unclear how the eastward propagation of the main rifting activity has occurred. The offset between the WVZ and the EVZ is accommodated by the South Iceland seismic zone, an area characterized by high earthquake activity. The EVZ transitions northward into the Northern Volcanic Zone (NVZ), which contains Krafla volcano. The NVZ is connected to the Kolbeinsey Ridge by the Tjörnes fracture zone, another major centre of seismicity and deformation.

Associated with the active volcanism in the rift zones are high-temperature geothermal fields. These are driven by magma intrusion and are associated with temperatures around 200–300 °C (392–572 °F) at more than 2 km (1.2 mi) depth while beyond the rift zones, particularly on the North American plate are found low-temperature geothermal fields related to local disturbances in the general heat flow from the mantle which have temperatures lower than 150 °C (302 °F) at 2 km (1.2 mi) depth.

There is continuing active volcanism and a recent example is the volcanic and earthquake activity occurring in the Reykjanes Peninsula from 2020 onwards, after nearly 800 years of inactivity. After the eruption of the Fagradalsfjall volcano on 19 March 2021, National Geographic's experts predicted that this "may mark the start of decades of volcanic activity". There was a fissure eruption adjacent to the summit of Litli-Hrútur in July 2023, followed in October 2023 with earthquake unrest that lead to the evacuation of the town of Grindavík. Then a new fissure eruption happened in the Eldvörp–Svartsengi area on 18 December 2023, with activity ongoing in 2024.

== Modern glaciers ==
Map of larger glacial catchments in Iceland (light grey shading). Clicking on the map rectangle will enlarge it and enables mouse over that allows identification of individual catchments.

The history of glaciation on Iceland began 3.3 million years ago, marking a dramatic change in environmental conditions. Glaciers cover about 11% of Iceland; easily the largest of these is Vatnajökull. Icelandic glaciers have generally been retreating over the past 100 years. Vatnajökull has been described as one of the more sensitive glaciers to climate change and has lost as much as 10% of its volume.

As many glaciers overlie active volcanoes, subglacial eruptions can pose hazards due to sudden floods produced by glacial meltwater, known as jökulhlaup. Another subglacial volcanic hazard is the phreatomagmatic eruption. In the case of Iceland, this type of eruption is the cause of massive plumes of volcanic ash that migrate to Europe and disrupt air traffic. Historically these explosive eruptions have had other impacts on human civilization as well, including acid rain and significant changes in weather patterns. Grímsvötn – a major sub-glacial volcano located beneath the Vatnajökull ice cap – is prone to this type of eruption.

=== Icelandic Surge-type Glaciers ===
All of Iceland's ice capped volcanic plateaus have unique surge-type glaciers, some of the best studied are Brúarjökull, Eyjabakkajökull and Múlajökull. Surge-type glaciers account for less than 1% of glaciers worldwide and are relegated to a narrow climate band with cold marine low arctic conditions. These glaciers exhibit a dual phase development:

1. long periods of quiescence with small scale seasonal advance and retreat,
2. sudden and rapid advancement lasting several months to years.

One of the largest glacial surges in recorded history occurred in 1963-64 when the Brúarjökull glacier advanced 9 km (5.6 mi) in a period of approximately 3 months. Glacial ice advanced 120 meters (390 feet) per day moving 34 million cubic meters of ice and rock.

Researchers are working to understand the glacial stability and threshold behaviors of these glacial surge events. While mechanisms are still poorly understood, surge frequency could be related to climate cycles, basal hydrology, volcanic eruptions and jökulhlaups. Work has been done to understand the glaciotectonic interactions between the base of glacial ice and subglacial sediment that allows for such rapid motion. A model proposed in 2006 suggests that due to high pore fluid pressures in fine grained basal sediments, surge glaciers like Brúarjökull decouple beneath subglacial sediments along a strong stratigraphic contrast (subglacial sediment vs impermeable basalt bedrock). Connecting these tectonic models with produced moraine products has proved useful in understanding the dynamics of these complex glacial systems.

== Plate movement and deformation ==
Global plate motion models have determined that Iceland is rifting at a rate of approximately 1.8–1.9 cm/year (0.71–0.75 in/year). Several processes contribute to the movement and deformation of the Icelandic landmass, such as the spreading plate boundary, active volcanism, seismic activity, and glacial activity. With time, it's believed that the result of these forces will be to create new plate boundaries, with the potential for the formation of new micro-tectonic plates.

The rate of plate rifting, or spreading, varies across the island, but generally is the greatest near zones of more active volcanism. Accordingly, volcanism on Iceland can be related to the amount of crustal spreading in each region. These distinctions reveal that regions of older, less active volcanism are split by regions of younger activity, revealing the location and trend of the active rifting zones. In Iceland there is a high rate of seismicity, with most earthquakes being recorded at or near these zones, correlated with active volcanoes and motion of the spreading boundary, often expressed as system of transform faults. Generally the most significant earthquakes are in the transform zones of the South Iceland Seismic Zone and Tjörnes Fracture Zone, and at central volcanoes undergoing volcanic unrest.

Glaciation on Iceland has a significant impact on erosional patterns, the formation of volcanic landforms, and the movement of the crust. Glacial isostatic adjustment as a response to the retreat of glacial systems since the 1890s shows a horizontal displacement of a few millimeters per year. Vertical rebound is much greater, with thinning of glaciers resulting in approximately 30 mm/yr of vertical motion. Extended periods of monitoring suggest that the rate of vertical motion of Iceland is increasing, as glaciers continue to be depleted.

Rates of crustal deformation in Iceland can be measured and calculated in a number of ways. One way scientists measure the island's movements and changes is through a permanent network of continuous Global Positioning System (GPS) stations. As of 2009, there was a network of over 25 GPS stations located across Iceland, with installation of these stations having begun in 1999. Due to Iceland's location on both the North American and Eurasian plates, monitoring movement here has provided important data for estimating the spreading rates between these two plates. By using the 25 GPS sites on Iceland and using 11 other IGS (International GNSS Service) sites from across the North Atlantic to constrain the coordinates of Iceland sites, along with several mathematical corrections, scientists were able to measure the precise motion of Iceland as a whole, as well as individual areas where motion is different.

== Human impact and natural catastrophes ==
=== Deforestation ===
Deforestation of Iceland has been a result of human impact and the climate. Since the island's settlement in the 7th century, the native forests and woodlands have been cut down for fuel and for timber. Upon settlement, it had a rich environment, but it was fragile. After consistent logging and resource exploitation, only about 1.9% of the country is a forest or woodland, mostly made up of small birch and willows. There have been projects to improve the nation's woodland through the Icelandic Forestry Service.

=== Soil erosion ===
Soil erosion is a major environmental degradation issue for Iceland with 39% of the country's land being categorized as having extensive soil erosion. The country's woodlands and forests have been exploited for fuel and timber and as settlements grew, livestock populations increased and agriculture expanded. Many natural and anthropogenic causes have made Iceland a scarce landscape made up of grasses, moss, and short, thin trees, such as pine and birch. Its lack of vegetation cover has left the soil more vulnerable to weathering and natural catastrophe events, such as volcanic activity and landslides. Iceland's cold climate slows plant growth, leaving the soil susceptible to the impact of strong winds. Soil erosion, and land degradation in general, decreases biodiversity and the health of the surrounding ecosystems.

The government of Iceland and its people have undertaken many soil restoration projects. They created the Soil Conservation Service of Iceland (SCS) in 1909 which works on ecosystem restoration projects. In 2007, they organized the Hekluskógar project where local landowners and farmers were encouraged to plant native birch and willows on their lands. By 2010 over 2.3 million seedlings were planted in small inlets around the country.

=== Overgrazing ===
Soil erosion rates are also increased by overgrazing. Sheep are one of the primary livestock of Iceland and have been there for centuries. During this time, the sheep have grazed on the native vegetation and began to exhaust the local resources as the sheep populations grew. A lack of preventative policy led to overgrazing in multiple areas across the country. The persistent issue of land degradation caused by overgrazing and land exploitation remains a pressing concern.

=== Other ===
- Geothermal energy use
- Laki eruption
- Jökulhlaup
- Fluorosis
- 2008 Iceland earthquake

== See also ==
- Fossils of Iceland
- Geography of Iceland
- Geological deformation of Iceland
- Geothermal power in Iceland
- Iceland plume
- List of fjords of Iceland
- List of glaciers of Iceland
- List of islands of Iceland
- List of lakes of Iceland
- List of rivers of Iceland
- List of volcanoes in Iceland
- List of waterfalls of Iceland
- Volcanism of Iceland
- List of volcanic eruptions in Iceland
