= 1905 in Iceland =

- Decades: 1880s; 1890s; 1900s; 1910s; 1920s
- See also: Other events in 1905 · Timeline of Icelandic history

Events in the year 1905 in Iceland.

== Incumbents ==
- Monarch: Christian IX
- Prime Minister: Hannes Þórður Pétursson Hafstein

== Events ==
- Verzló, now the oldest private school in Iceland, is founded.
- The National Court is founded.

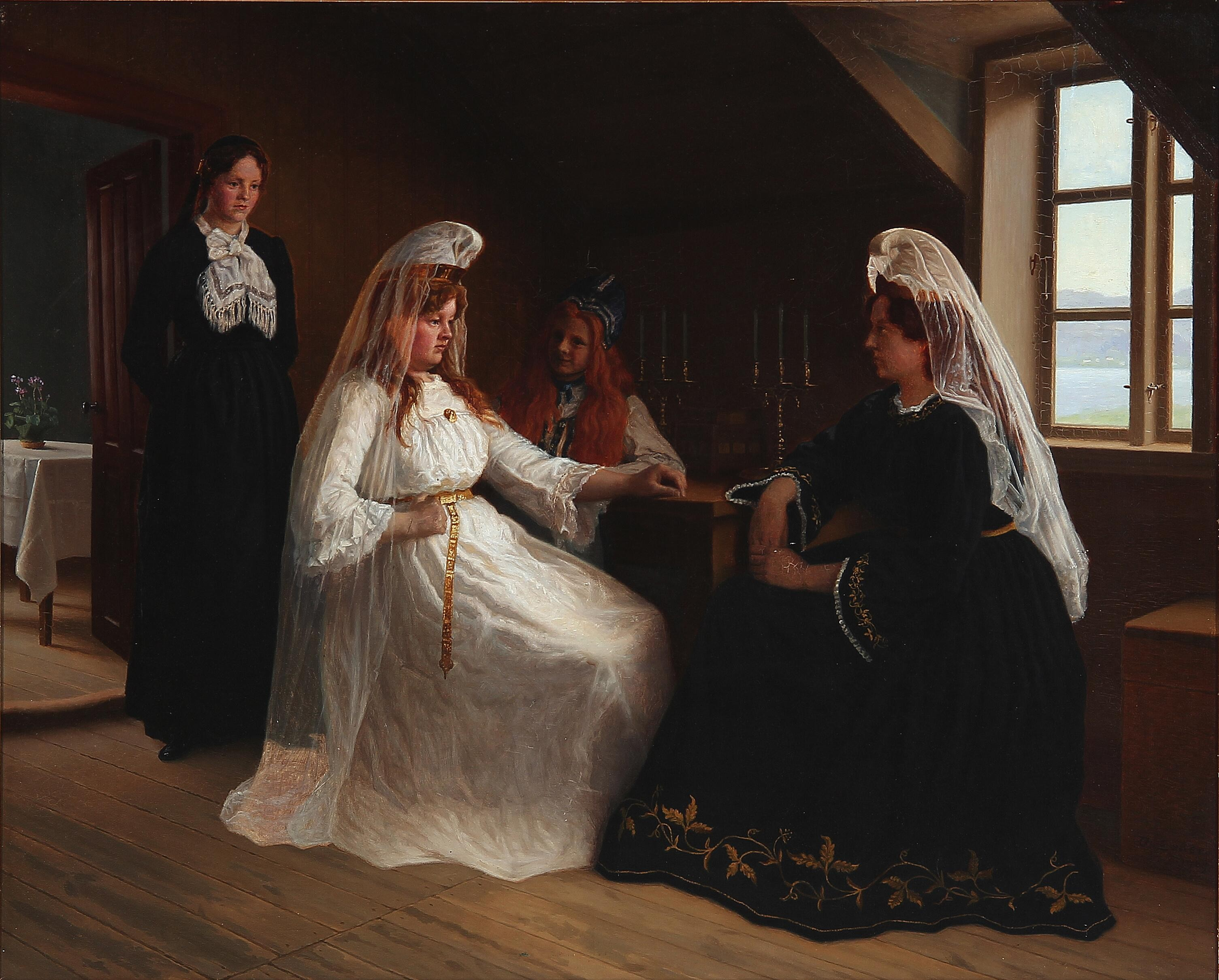
Interior with a bride and other women of Iceland at a table. - A. Exner 1905
