= 1903 in Iceland =

- Decades: 1880s; 1890s; 1900s; 1910s; 1920s
- See also: Other events in 1903 · Timeline of Icelandic history

Events in the year 1903 in Iceland.

== Incumbents ==
- Monarch: Christian IX
- Minister for Iceland: Peter Adler Alberti

== Events ==
- 22 February – The Fríkirkjan í Reykjavík is consecrated in Reykjavik.
- Íþróttabandalag Vestmannaeyja, along with the ÍBV men's football team is established in Vestmannaeyjar.

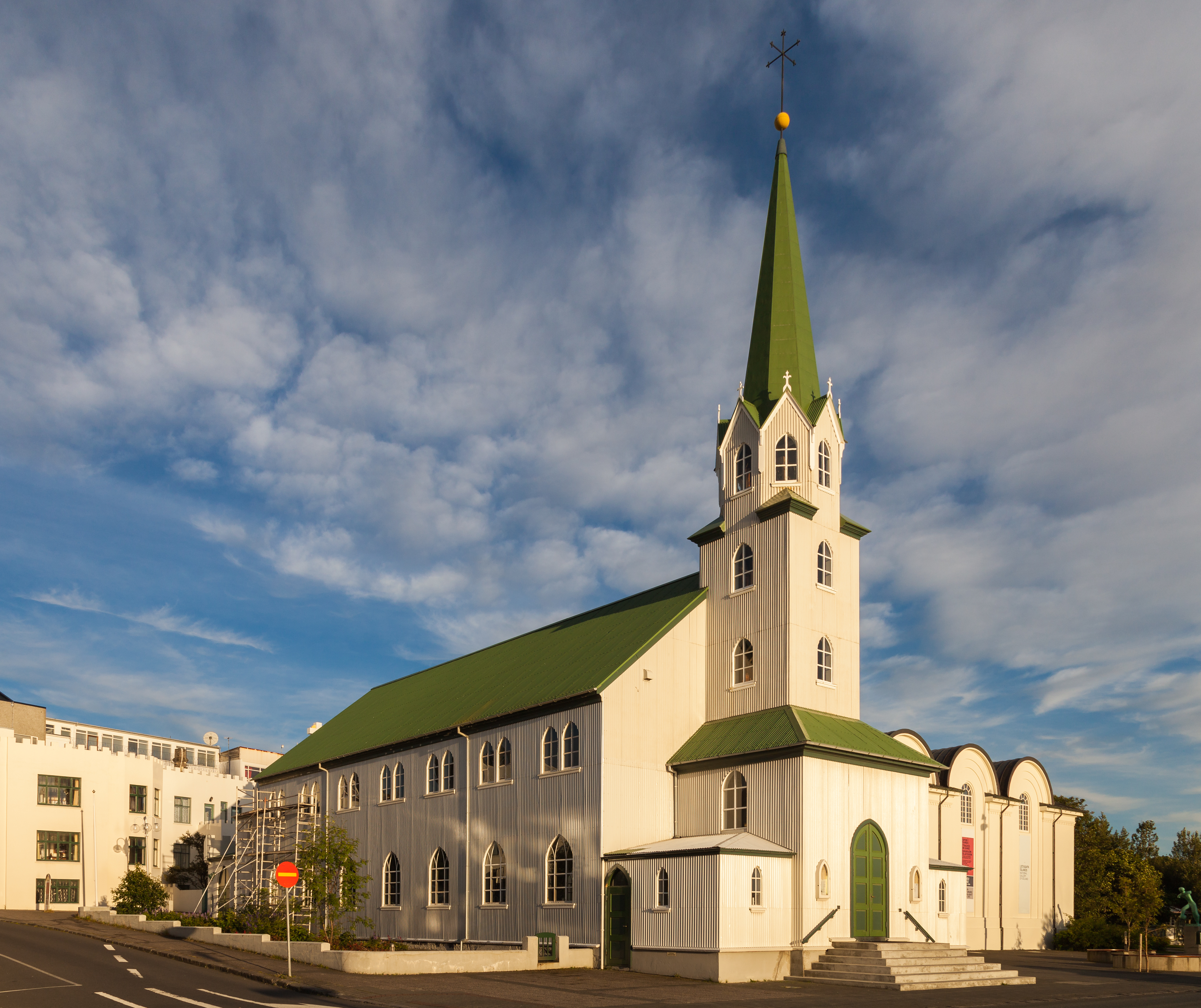
Fríkirkjan í Reykjavík consecrated in 1903.
