= Björn Hjörtur Guðmundsson =

Icelandic craftsman (1911–1998)

- Born: 14 January 1911; Ferjubakka í Borgarhreppi, Iceland
- Died: 14 July 1998 (aged 87); Borgarnes, Iceland
- Occupations: craftsman, idealist, environmental pioneer

Björn Hjörtur Guðmundsson (14 January 1911 – 14 July 1998), also known as Bjössi, was an Icelandic craftsman, master carpenter, idealist and environmental pioneer. He lived and worked in Borgarnes, Iceland, where he designed and constructed a small theme park for children called Bjössaróló, with play equipment which he built entirely from salvaged materials, and maintained it for many years. The President of Iceland, Vigdís Finnbogadóttir, visited Bjössaróló in 1993.

== Biography ==
Björn was born in Ferjubakka í Borgarhreppi in 1911, son of Guðmundur Andrésson (31 October 1870 – 3 January 1969) and Ragnhildur Jónsdóttir (2 September 1877 – 2 July 1943). The family moved to Borgarnes in 1934 and Björn worked for the local Cooperative Society, Kaupfélag Borgfirðinga, which was the main employer in the area. After training as a carpenter he played a significant role as supervisor of buildings for Kaupfélag Borgfirðinga for many years.

Björn started constructing Bjössaróló in 1979, continually adding to it and maintaining it until he was well into his seventies. He built all the play equipment from discarded salvaged materials, painting them in colours that blended with the surrounding environment. Björn loved children, and used the design of Bjössaróló to teach them his wisdom about life. Ahead of his time in his promotion of recycling, he was frugal and tidy and wanted children to learn the same virtues and to approach nature with respect and care. He taught them to enjoy flowers and let them grow instead of picking them, and he even designed the approach to Bjössaróló intentionally circuitous, he said, in order to teach the children to take their time on their way through life. The site has views over the coast, so while the children are playing their parents can enjoy the scenery.

"This was a magical place, but a totally human magic", commented one visitor. Another described it as "brilliantly executed with slides built into the surrounding hillocks, a variety of swings, a jungle gym, spinning top and several lookout points, the place was swarming with children" The play equipment also includes an old boat, a castle, seesaws and climbing dome. One swing is made from a garden bench and is popular not only with children but also courting couples.

In 1994, at the age of 83, Björn moved into residential accommodation for the elderly where he continued his carpentry. He died in Borgarnes on 14 July 1998, and his funeral was held in Borgarnes church on 28 July. The Icelandic national newspaper Morgunblaðið published a lengthy obituary.

== Legacy ==
In 2001 a commemorative board in memory of Björn was unveiled in Bjössaróló by President of Council Guðrúnu Jónsdóttur. The board shows a photograph of Björn with Vigdís Finnbogadóttir, President of Iceland, taken during her visit to Bjössaróló in 1993 and has text in Icelandic and English telling the story of Bjössaróló, of Björn its creator, and of his ideals and vision.

By 2004 Bjössarólo had fallen into some disrepair and in April 2008 funding was being sought for its upkeep. By July 2008 a two million króna grant from Orkuveita Reykjavíkur (Reykjavik Energy) and a further half million anonymous donation had opened the way to the continued maintenance of the park.

On 14 January 2011, the hundredth anniversary of Björn's birth, a special exhibition opened in the Museum in Borgarnes featuring information about Björn, displays of his tools, and guest books from Bjössaróló.

Bjössaróló features in the branding for Steðjakósa C33, a new double IPA from Steðja brewery, launched at the end of 2022.

== Personal life ==
Björn married Ingu Ágústu Þorkelsdóttur (25 August 1917 – 22 February 1993) on 25 October 1942. They had two children: Birgir (23 September 1941 – 8 December 2009) and Alda (30 August 1942 – 7 July 1991).
