= 1913 in Iceland =

- Decades: 1890s; 1900s; 1910s; 1920s; 1930s
- See also: Other events in 1913 · Timeline of Icelandic history

The following lists events in 1913 in Iceland.

== Incumbents ==
- Monarch: Christian X
- Prime Minister – Hannes Hafstein

== Events ==
- The first Bjargtangar Lighthouse was established.
- The newspaper Morgunblaðið was founded.

== Births ==
- 13 February – Halldóra Briem, architect (d. 1993).
- 1 March – Ólafur Jóhannesson, politician (d. 1984)
- 1 September – Guðmundur Arnlaugsson, chess player (d. 1996).

=== Full date missing ===
- Björn Sigurðsson, physician (d. 1959)

== Deaths ==
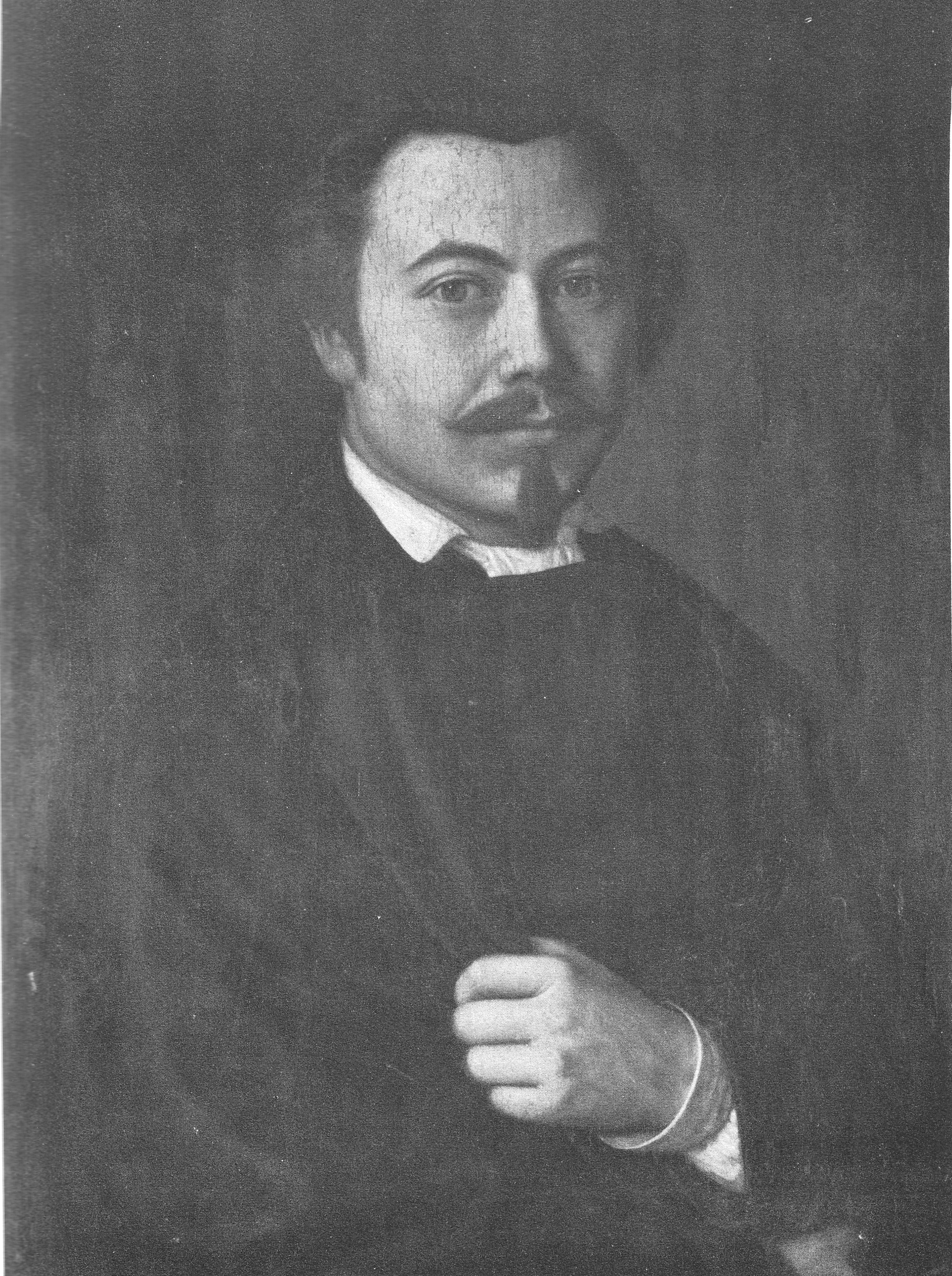
Steingrímur Thorsteinsson

- 24 January – Eiríkr Magnússon, scholar (b. 1833)

=== Full date missing ===
- Steingrímur Thorsteinsson, poet and writer (b. 1831)
