= Bifrost Volume 2: Combat =

Bifrost Volume 2: Combat is a 1978 role-playing game supplement published by Skytrex Ltd. for Bifrost.

== Contents ==
Bifrost Volume 2: Combat is a supplement in which the initial version of the combat rules includes comprehensive guidelines on weapon skills, both melee and missile combat, strategies for engaging multiple enemies, and rules for mass combat scenarios.

== Publication history ==
Bifrost Volume 2: Combat was written by K. White, K. Minear, S. Johnson, and G. Highley, and was published by Skytrex Ltd. (U.K) in 1978 as a 38-page book.
