= 2008 Iceland earthquake =

Doublet earthquake with composite magnitude of 6.1 Mw

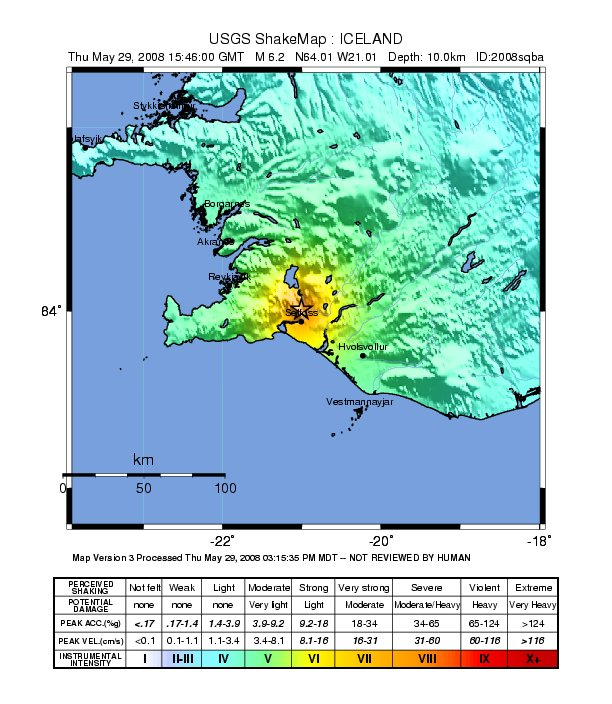
- UTC time: 2008-05-29 15:46:00
- ISC event: 13230288
- USGS-ANSS: ComCat
- Local date: 29 May 2008
- Local time: 15:46
- Magnitude: 6.3 M_{wc}
- Depth: 10 km (6.2 mi)
- Epicenter: 63.96°N 20.99°W
- Type: Right-lateral strike-slip
- Areas affected: Iceland
- Max. intensity: MMI VIII (Severe)
- Casualties: 30 injuries

The 2008 Iceland earthquake was a doublet earthquake that struck on 29 May at 15:46 UTC in southwestern Iceland. The recorded magnitudes of the two main quakes were 5.9 M_{w} and 5.8 M_{w}, respectively, giving a composite magnitude of 6.1 M_{w}. There were no human fatalities, but injuries were reported and a number of sheep were killed. The epicenter of the earthquake was between the towns of Hveragerði and Selfoss, about 45 kilometers (28 mi) east-southeast of the capital, Reykjavík. It was the strongest earthquake to hit Iceland since the summer of 2000.

== Characteristics ==
Iceland straddles the Mid-Atlantic Ridge where the Eurasian and North-American tectonic plates move away from each other. Volcanic activity is common along such divergent boundaries but strong earthquakes are rare. In Iceland the ridge is somewhat off-set, creating two transform faults where plates move horizontally along each other. One is in the north of the country and one in the south; the strongest Icelandic earthquakes happen along those transform faults. The 29 May quake is classified by geologists as a typical Suðurlandsskjálfti (literally: Southern Region quake), a strong earthquake that happens on Iceland's southern fault.

== Damage ==
Unlike the quakes in the summer of 2000, the 29 May quake happened in the most densely populated part of the South Iceland district. The population of the affected area is about 12,000 and it includes the towns of Selfoss and Hveragerði as well as Eyrarbakki, Stokkseyri and Þorlákshöfn. Many farms were also affected.

== See also ==
- Geology of Iceland
- List of earthquakes in 2008
- List of earthquakes in Iceland

== Sources ==
- ANSS, "M6.3 – Iceland", Comprehensive Catalog, U.S. Geological Survey
- "Strong earthquake rocks Iceland". BBC News. 29 May 2008.
- Decriem, J.; Árnadóttir, T.; Hooper, A.; Geirsson, H.; Sigmundsson, F.; Keiding, M.; Ófeigsson, B. G.; Hreinsdóttir, S.; Einarsson, P.; LaFemina, P.; Bennett, R. A. (2010), "The 2008 May 29 earthquake doublet in SW Iceland", Geophysical Journal International, 181 (2): 1128–1146, Bibcode:2010GeoJI.181.1128D, doi:10.1111/j.1365-246x.2010.04565.x.
- International Seismological Centre, ISC-EHB Bulletin, Thatcham, United Kingdom
