= List of earthquakes in Iceland =

Map of notable earthquakes in Iceland since 1900 numbered from most recent.

Some notable earthquakes in Iceland have been during earthquake swarms with several earthquakes having very similar magnitude and contributing to human injury, death and/or property damage. Accordingly, the largest earthquake may be shown on this page rather than ones that also contributed to the notability. Notable earthquakes in Iceland tend to be close to population centres and therefore do not reflect the full distribution of the high local seismic activity. This distribution includes the transform faults in the South Iceland seismic zone (SISZ) and Tjörnes fracture zone, as well as activity in volcanic rift zones.

== Geology ==
Outline of Iceland deformation and seismic zones

Iceland lies on the spreading axis of the Mid-Atlantic Ridge (MAR) where it is influenced by the Iceland hotspot, a major mantle upwelling. The active spreading axis of the MAR is moving westward with respect to the hotspot. This means that the active rifts above the hotspot have progressively jumped towards the east, causing the development of two major transform zones in the north and south of the island. To the south is the approximately 20 km (12 mi) wide SISZ, which is quite active for earthquakes, and this has a west–east trend. Most earthquakes in this zone are associated with movement on north–south trending right lateral strike-slip faults, although there is also evidence of WSW–ENE trending faults.

According to historical records, there have been 33 damaging earthquakes in the SISZ from the 11th century up to June 2000, with the latest being in 1896 and 1912.

== Notable earthquakes ==
Date	Location	Mag.	MMI	Deaths	Injuries	Comments	Ref.
2023-11-10	Southern Peninsula; 63.952°N 22.346°W	5.3 M_{ww}	V	1 missing		Severe damage to Grindavik with evacuations. Earthquake swarm commenced 24 October 2023	(Note: The missing man is assumed to have fallen into a fissure that developed during the earthquake swarm)
2022-07-31	Southern Peninsula; 63.955°N 22.350°W	5.4 M_{ww}	VII			Moderate damage	
2021-02-24	Southern Peninsula; 63.949°N 22.285°W	5.6 M_{ww}	VII		1 mild injury	Mild damage	NGDC
2008-05-29	Hveragerði, Selfoss; 63.96°N 20.99°W	6.3 M_{w}	VIII		30	Rockslides	
2000-06-21	Hesfjall, Southern Peninsula; 63.98°N 20.71°W	6.5 M_{L}	X			Severe damage	
2000-06-17	Hella, Southern Peninsula; 63.97°N 20.37°W	6.6 M_{L}	IX		3	Severe damage	
1976-01-13	Kópasker; 66.157°N 16.582°W	6.4 M_{s}	IX			Moderate damage	NGDC
1968-12-05	Kleifarvatn, Southern Peninsula; 63.929°N 21.954°W	6.0 M_{s}	VIII			Moderate damage in Hafnarfjörður	
1934-06-02	Dalvíkurbyggð; 65.847°N 18.839°W	6.2 M_{s}	VIII			Major damage, 200 people homeless	NGDC,
1929-07-23	Brennisteinsfjöll, Southern Peninsula; 64.061°N 21.901°W	6.5 M_{s}	IX		Around 100 minor	Moderate damage in Reykjavík	
1912-05-06	Hekla, Southern Peninsula; 64.044°N 19.633°W	7.5	XI	11			NGDC
1896-09-05	Southern Peninsula	6.0, 6.5 and 6.0	IX	3		Three major earthquakes with short intervals. (Around 3.000 houses or farms destroyed)	
1896-08-27	Skarðsfjall, Southern Peninsula	6.7	X	1			NGDC
1896-08-26	Rangárvallasýrsla, Southern Peninsula	7.0	X			Major damage, many farms destroyed	
1872	Húsavík, Norðurþing	6.5				Heavy damage	
1784-08-14	Southern (Suðurland)		X			Severe damage	NGDC
1734	Southern lowland			9		Severe damage / Many homes destroyed	NGDC
1706-04-20	Selfoss		X	999		Severe damage	NGDC
1211	Southern (Suðurland)		X	18		Severe damage	
1182	Southern (Suðurland)		X	11			NGDC
1164	Grímsnes		X	19			NGDC
1013	Southern (Suðurland)		X	11			NGDC
Note: The inclusion criteria for adding events are based on WikiProject Earthquakes' notability guideline that was developed for stand alone articles. The principles described also apply to lists. In summary, only damaging, injurious, or deadly events should be recorded. A compilation exists, for details of Icelandic earthquakes up to 2014 as some have been without significant damage, even if high magnitude events.

== See also ==
- Geology of Iceland
- Lists of earthquakes
