= Bifrost (role-playing game) =

Bifrost is a role-playing game published by Skytrex Ltd. (U.K) in four volumes from 1977 to 1982.

== Description ==
Bifrost is a fantasy system, fairly complex and derivative of miniatures. The rules cover character creation, combat (melee, mounted, and aerial), magic, demonology, prayer and divine intervention, disease and illness, travel to other planes, etc.

== Publication history ==
Bifrost was designed by K. White, K. Minear, S. Johnson, and G. Highley, and published by Skytrex Ltd. Its first volume Faerie came out in 1977, covering character creation and background rules. The game wasn't playable, though, without at least the second volume Combat from 1978, which would describe skill use and especially combat; and if players wanted to use magic the third volume Magic, whose publishing year is not known due to a missing copyright notice. A fourth volume from 1982 would later provide additional rules and amendments to existing ones.

== Reception ==
Lewis Pulsipher reviewed Bifrost in The Space Gamer No. 57. Pulsipher commented that "Few readers of Bifrost will decide to convert to it from their current FRPG, nor is it for novices. But there are many aspects which can be adapted to cover holes in other FRPGs. It must be virtually impossible to buy Bifrost in the USA, nor can I recommend mail order to Britain. But if you do run across it in a shop, take a look."
