= Borgarhreppur =

Coordinates: 64.621°N 21.827°W

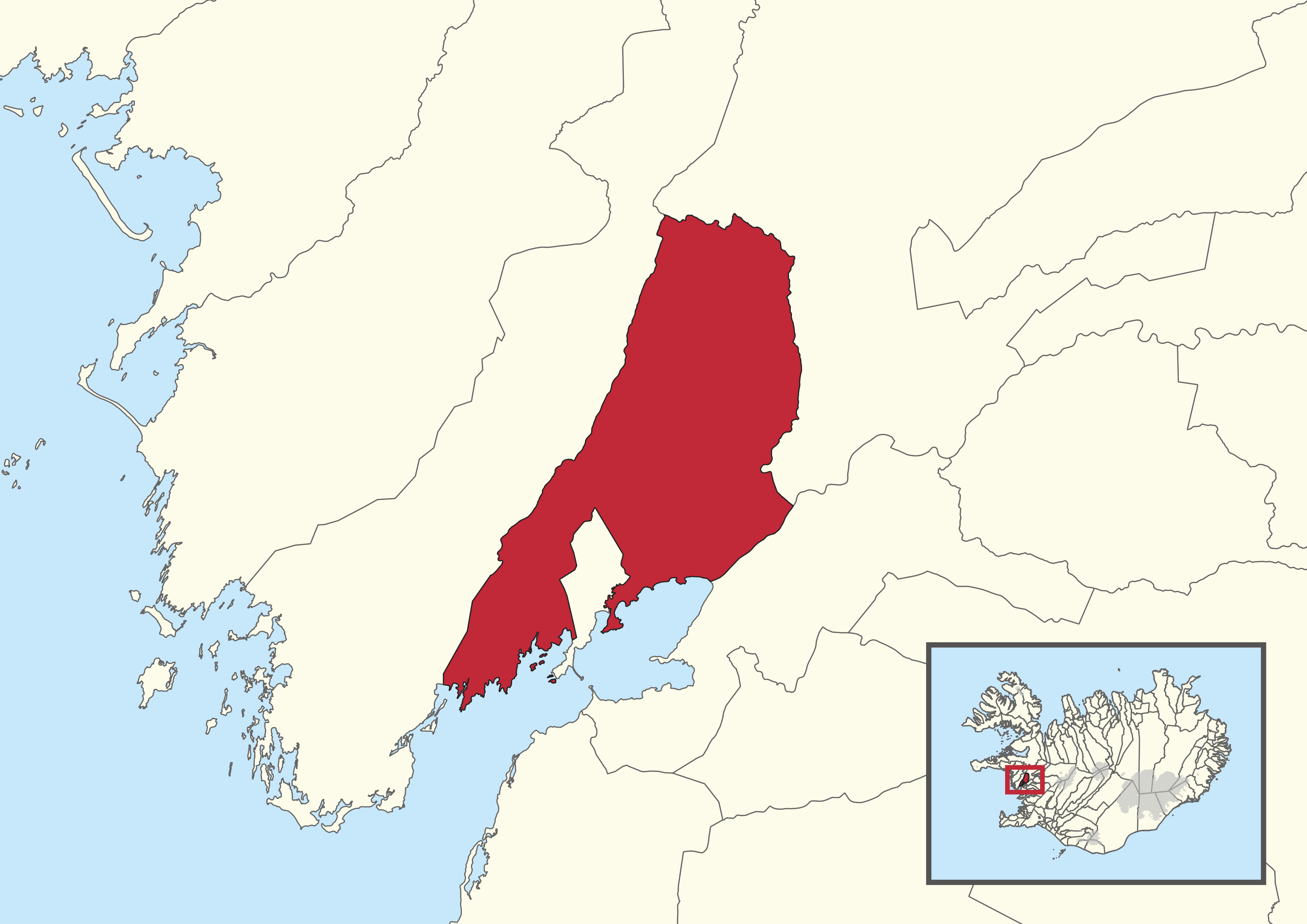
Borgarhreppur during the years 1913-1998

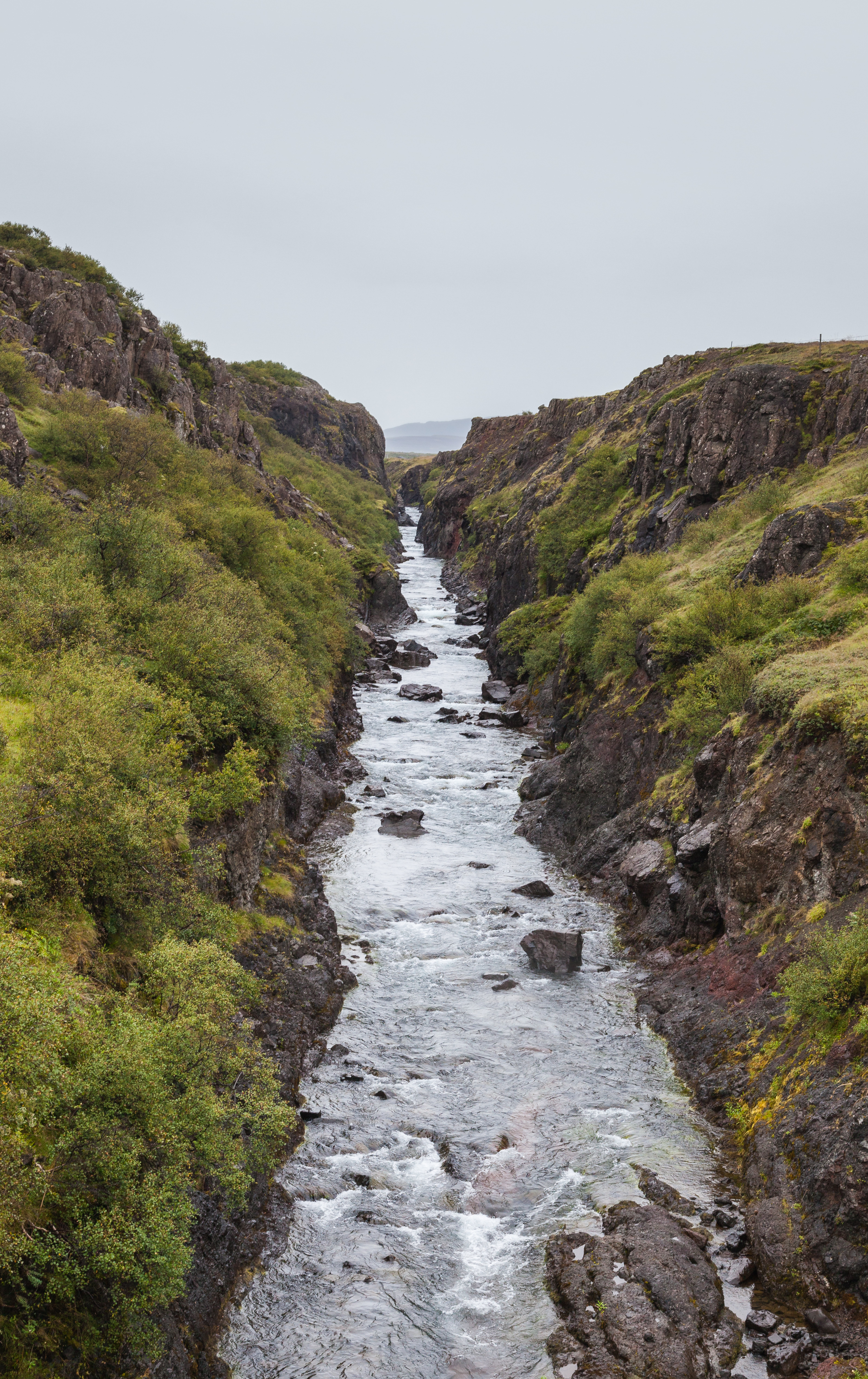
River in Borgarhreppur, Vesturland, Iceland

Borgarhreppur (Icelandic pronunciation: [ˈpɔrkar̥ˌr̥ɛhpʏr̥]) was formerly a rural parish (hreppur) in Mýrasýsla county, west Iceland, named after the ancient farm and church estate Borg á Mýrum which was occupied by Skallagrímur Kveldúlfsson, one of Iceland's original settlers.

On 7 June 1998, Borgarhreppur joined the Borgarbyggð municipality, along with Álftaneshreppur and Þverárhlíðarhreppur.
