= Kristján Jónsson (politician) =

Icelandic politician (1852–1926)

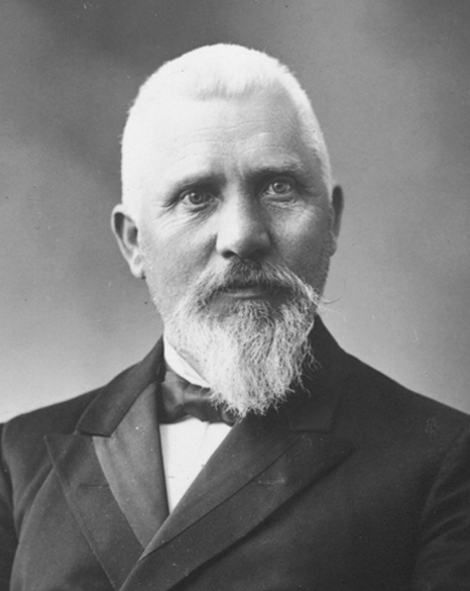

3rd Minister for Iceland
- In office 14 March 1911 – 24 July 1912
- Preceded by: Björn Jónsson
- Succeeded by: Hannes Hafstein

Personal details
- Born: 4 March 1852 Gautlönd, Iceland
- Died: 2 July 1926 (aged 74) Reykjavík, Kingdom of Iceland
- Party: independent

Kristján Jónsson (4 March 1852 – 2 July 1926) was Denmark's Minister for Iceland from 14 March 1911 to 24 July 1912 and a member of the cabinet of Danish Prime Minister Klaus Berntsen. He was a member of Althingi 1893 to 1905 and from 1908 to 1913.

== Biography ==
He was born on the farm Gautlönd in north east Iceland and two of his brothers became politicians, Pétur (28 August 1858 – 20 January 1922, member of Althingi 1894–1922, minister of Industrial Affairs 1920–1922) and Steingrímur (27 December 1867 – 29 December 1956, member of Althingi 1906–1915). Kristján was the father in law of Sigurður Eggerz, who later took office as Minister for Iceland. He is the great-grandfather of Icelandic footballer Jón Böðvarsson.

=== Death ===
Kristján died at his home in Reykjavík on 2 July 1926.
