= Bifröst University =

University in Iceland

Coordinates: 64.7668°N 21.5519°W

- Háskólinn á Bifröst
- Former name: Samvinnuskólinn (the Cooperative College)
- Type: private
- Established: 1918
- Rector: Ólína Kjerúlf Þorvarðardóttir
- Students: ca. 2800
- Location: Borgarbyggð, Iceland
- Campus: Rural
- Colors: Blue
- Website: www.bifrost.is/english/

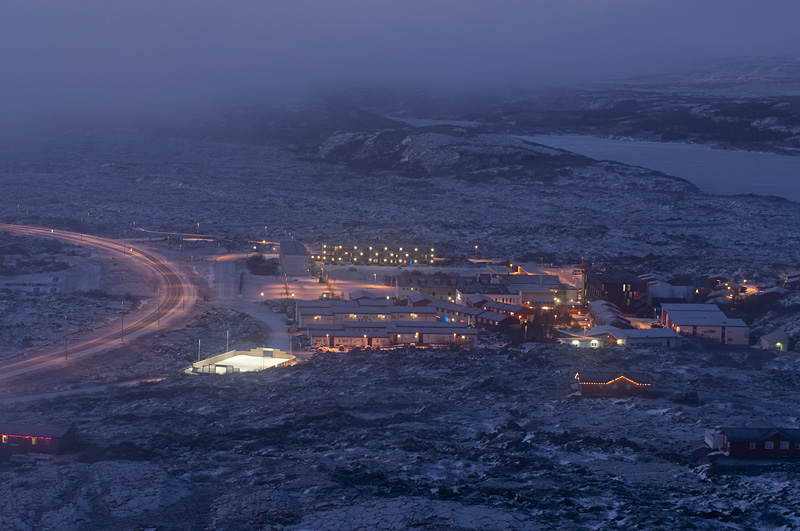
Bifröst University as seen from a nearby volcano

Bifröst University (Icelandic pronunciation: [ˈpɪvˌrœst]) is a private university in the west of Iceland. Bifröst University offers higher education through an innovative online learning environment. The University offers undergraduate and postgraduate programmes through three academic faculties: Faculty of Business, Faculty of Law and Faculty of Social Sciences, as well as a remedial university preparatory course. In the year 2025, the university had around 2800 enrolled students.

== History ==
The university was founded in Reykjavík in 1918 as a secondary school called the Cooperative College (Samvinnuskólinn). The school was run by the Icelandic cooperative movement (Samband íslenskra samvinnufélaga) and was originally intended as a training college for the staff of cooperative stores and other members of the movement. The founder and first head of the school was Jónas Jónsson from Hrifla, who was for many years a member of Parliament for the Progressive Party. He had studied at Askov Folk High School in Denmark and Ruskin College in Oxford, and his ideas about education were innovative for the time.

In 1955, the school moved to Bifröst in the scenic countryside of Norðurárdalur. Within walking distance are Lake Hreðavatn, the waterfall Glanni, and the volcanic cones of Grábrók and Grábrókarfell. At first, the school offered a two-year residential program in retail management for students aged roughly sixteen to eighteen. During the 1980s and the 1990s, the school slowly transformed into a university-level institution offering diploma and bachelor's programs in business.

In 1998, a tunnel was opened which reduced the driving time from Reykjavík to Bifröst to around an hour and a half, changes in Icelandic society increased the demand for higher education, and new legislation authorized universities to charge fees. Bifröst took advantage of these developments, expanded its programs and student numbers considerably, and began charging tuition to students in addition to receiving state support.

In 2006, the institution's name was changed from Bifröst School of Business to Bifröst University. Later that year, the school's rector resigned amid controversy, partly involving allegations of financial mismanagement.

== International collaboration ==
Bifröst University supports research and innovation through specialised research centres and interdisciplinary collaboration. The university also participates in international academic and research partnerships, including Erasmus+ and the OpenEU Alliance — a European university alliance focused on accessible, high-quality online education and lifelong learning.

The university is an active member of the University of the Arctic. UArctic is an international cooperative network based in the Circumpolar Arctic region, consisting of more than 200 universities, colleges, and other organizations with an interest in promoting education and research in the Arctic region.

The university participates in UArctic's mobility program north2north. The aim of that program is to enable students of member institutions to study in different parts of the North.

== Courses ==
Bifröst offers a selection of undergraduate and graduate courses and Micro studies taught in English. University Gateway is a preparation for university studies, providing a pathway for students whose native language is not Icelandic. It includes Icelandic language courses.

- Faculty of Business
- Faculty of Social Science
- Micro Credentials
- University Gateway

== See also ==
- Skemman.is (digital library)
