= Federation of Icelandic Cooperative Societies =

Federation of Icelandic Cooperative Societies (Icelandic: Samband íslenskra samvinnufélaga) (SIS) was an Icelandic coordinator in Icelandic cooperatives. It was established on 20 February 1902 by three local cooperatives in Þingey County, but evolved into a national forum for cooperation in the field of exports and imports and to achieve favorable contracts abroad. In 1917, the institution moved its headquarters from Akureyri to Reykjavík and became "one of the largest commercial enterprises in Iceland". Its ship department was founded in 1946 and saw competition with Eimskip. After falling into financial hardships in the 1980s, it was closed in 1992, due to the debt with its creditors.
