= Björn Jónsson =

Icelandic politician

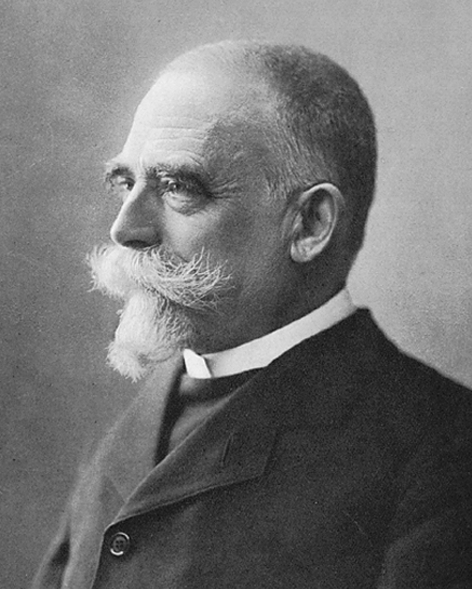

2nd Minister for Iceland
- In office 31 March 1909 – 14 March 1911
- Preceded by: Hannes Hafstein
- Succeeded by: Kristján Jónsson

Personal details
- Born: 8 October 1846 Djúpadal, Gufudalssveit, Iceland
- Died: 24 November 1912 (aged 66) Reykjavík, Iceland
- Party: Independence Party
- Spouse: Elísabet Sveinsdóttir

Björn Jónsson (8 October 1846 – 24 November 1912) was minister for Iceland from 31 March 1909 to 14 March 1911. He was the father of Sveinn Björnsson, the only regent of Iceland and first president of Iceland. Björn became Minister for Iceland after Hannes Hafstein and his supporters suffered losses in the elections of 1908, where the voters rejected the draft of a new constitution. Björn was forced to resign after forcing the General Director of the National Bank, Tryggvi Gunnarsson, out of that post due to heavy criticism of their supporters. Björn and other opponents of the Draft won a landslide victory in the 1908 elections. He served as speaker of the Althing in 1909.

Björn was commonly known for Ísafold, the paper he published and edited from 1874 to 1909, and was known as Björn í Ísafold or Ísafoldar-Björn. Björn offended the Danish Authorities in 1909 by appointing a Councillor of Commerce to work on business negotiations for Iceland, when he appointed his supporter, Bjarni Jónsson frá Vogi, to that post. The Danish Authorities stated that appointing such a councillor was not in harmony with the common foreign policy of Denmark and Iceland.

In 1909, Björn got alcohol prohibition accepted in the Alþingi. It came into full effect in 1915, more than two years after Björn's death, and was not repealed until 1935, or arguably on Beer Day 1 March 1989, when beer was finally also allowed.

== Death ==
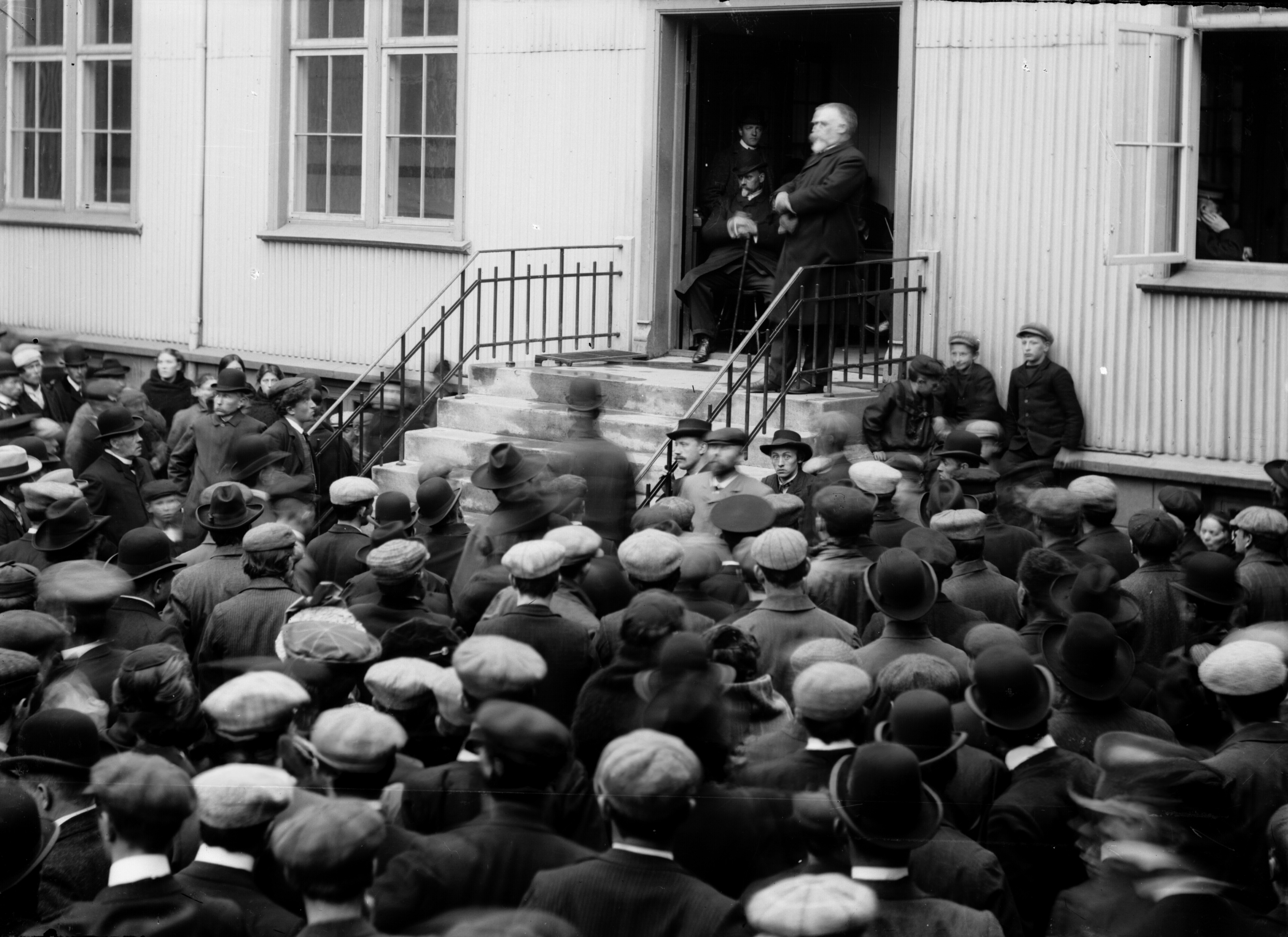
Björn Jónsson gives a speech to a gathering on 2 June 1908 regarding the autonomy of Iceland vis-à-vis Denmark. Iceland was then a Danish colony, gaining independence in 1944

Björn's health deteriorated sharply in his last years. He died at his home in Reykjavík on 24 November 1912 after suffering a stroke few days earlier.
