= List of parliamentary assemblies of Iceland =

This is a list of parliamentary assemblies of Iceland. Assemblies of Parliament in Iceland correspond to parliaments in the United Kingdom and congresses in the United States. Each parliamentary assembly (Icelandic: þing) is divided into meetings. Each parliamentary meeting (Icelandic: þingfundur) typically lasts a few hours and multiple meetings can occur the same day. Parliamentary assemblies are either regular assemblies (Icelandic: regluleg þing), beginning the second Tuesday of September and lasting a year, or extra-assemblies (Icelandic: aukaþing), beginning after elections in spring and adjourning before the start of a regular assembly.

Although parliamentary assemblies are sometimes referred to as sessions in English and extra-assemblies as special sessions, they are in fact not sessions. Assemblies, which typically last no more than a full year, divide solely into meetings. The business of an assembly, i.e. its schedule of meetings, may be postponed and resumed as need be, for instance to allow for summer holidays.

== Historical overview ==
- Commonwealth of Iceland (930–1262)
  - Parliament was founded at Þingvellir in 930. It held both legislative and judicial power but no executive power was present in the country.
- Union with Norway (1262–1814)
  - When Iceland became a dependency of Norway, the legislative power of Parliament was shared with the king of Norway who ruled through his officials. Laws adopted by Parliament were subject to royal assent and, conversely, if the king initiated legislation, Parliament had to give its consent.
- Danish monarchy (1380–1944)
  - Norway falls under the control the Danish monarchy and Iceland along with it. Parliament served almost exclusively as a court of law until the year 1800 when it was disbanded by royal decree.
  - A royal decree providing for the reestablishment of Parliament was issued on 8 March 1843. Elections were held the following year and the assembly finally met on 1 July 1845. Parliament functioned however only as a consultative assembly.
- Constitution of Iceland (1874)
  - The constitution of 1874 granted to Parliament joint legislative power with the crown in matters of exclusive Icelandic concern. The king retained the right to veto legislation and often, on the advice of his ministers, refused to consent to legislation adopted by Parliament.
  - Parliament began meeting in the newly built Parliament House in 1881 and has done so ever since.
  - A constitutional amendment, confirmed on 3 October 1903, granted Icelanders home rule and parliamentary government.
  - After 1915 standing committees began operating in Parliament for the first time. Parliament was bicameral and each chamber had the same seven standing committees.
- Kingdom of Iceland (1918–1944)
  - Parliament was granted unrestricted legislative power.
- Republic of Iceland (1944–present)
  - In May 1991, Parliament became unicameral, operating in a unified chamber.
  - Iceland joins the European Economic Area in 1994, thus transferring significant legislative power to the European Union.

== Parliament as a consultative assembly (1845–1873) ==
Assembly	Year	Begin date	Adjourn date	Election	Head of state
1st	1845	1 July	5 August	—N/a	Christian VIII
2nd	1847	1 July	7 August	—N/a	Christian VIII
3rd	1849	2 July	8 August	—N/a	Frederick VII
National Assembly	1851	5 July	9 August	—N/a	Frederick VII
4th	1853	1 July	10 August	—N/a	Frederick VII
5th	1855	2 July	9 August	—N/a	Frederick VII
6th	1857	1 July	17 August	—N/a	Frederick VII
7th	1859	1 July	18 August	—N/a	Frederick VII
8th	1861	1 July	19 August	—N/a	Frederick VII
9th	1863	1 July	17 August	—N/a	Frederick VII
10th	1865	1 July	26 August	—N/a	Christian IX
11th	1867	1 July	11 August	—N/a	Christian IX
12th	1869	27 July	13 August	—N/a	Christian IX
13th	1871	1 July	22 August	—N/a	Christian IX
14th	1873	1 July	2 August	—N/a	Christian IX

== Parliament as a legislative assembly (1875–present) ==
Assembly	Begin date (resumption)	Adjourn date (postponement)	Election	Head of state
1st	1 July 1875	26 August 1875	—N/a	Christian IX
2nd	2 July 1877	30 August 1877	—N/a	Christian IX
3rd	1 July 1879	27 August 1879	—N/a	Christian IX
4th	1 July 1881	27 August 1881	—N/a	Christian IX
5th	2 July 1883	27 August 1883	—N/a	Christian IX
6th	1 July 1885	27 August 1885	—N/a	Christian IX
7th (extra-assembly)	28 July 1886	26 August 1886	—N/a	Christian IX
8th	1 July 1887	26 August 1887	—N/a	Christian IX
9th	1 July 1889	26 August 1889	—N/a	Christian IX
10th	1 July 1891	26 August 1891	—N/a	Christian IX
11th	1 July 1893	26 August 1893	—N/a	Christian IX
12th (extra-assembly)	1 August 1894	28 August 1894	—N/a	Christian IX
13th	1 July 1895	24 August 1895	—N/a	Christian IX
14th	1 July 1897	26 August 1897	—N/a	Christian IX
15th	1 July 1899	26 August 1899	—N/a	Christian IX
16th	1 July 1901	26 August 1901	—N/a	Christian IX
17th (extra-assembly)	26 July 1902	25 August 1902	—N/a	Christian IX
18th	1 July 1903	26 August 1903	—N/a	Christian IX
19th	1 July 1905	29 August 1905	—N/a	Christian IX
20th	1 July 1907	14 September 1907	—N/a	Frederick VIII
21st	15 February 1909	8 May 1909	—N/a	Frederick VIII
22nd	15 February 1911	10 May 1911	—N/a	Frederick VIII
23rd (extra-assembly)	15 July 1912	26 August 1912	—N/a	Christian X
24th	1 July 1913	13 September 1913	—N/a	Christian X
25th (extra-assembly)	1 July 1914	13 August 1914	—N/a	Christian X
26th	7 July 1915	15 September 1915	—N/a	Christian X
27th (extra-assembly)	11 December 1916	13 January 1917	August 1916; October 1916	Christian X
28th	2 July 1917	17 September 1917	August 1916; October 1916	Christian X
29th (extra-assembly)	10 April 1918	18 July 1918	August 1916; October 1916	Christian X
30th (extra-assembly)	2 September 1918	10 September 1918	August 1916; October 1916	Christian X
31st	1 July 1919	27 September 1919	August 1916; October 1916	Christian X
32nd (extra-assembly)	5 February 1920	1 March 1920	1919	Christian X
33rd	15 February 1921	21 May 1921	1919	Christian X
34th	15 February 1922	26 April 1922	1919	Christian X
35th	15 February 1923	14 May 1923	1922	Christian X
36th	15 February 1924	7 May 1924	1923	Christian X
37th	7 February 1925	16 May 1925	1923	Christian X
38th	6 February 1926	15 May 1926	1923	Christian X
39th	9 February 1927	19 May 1927	1926	Christian X
40th	19 January 1928	18 April 1928	1927	Christian X
41st	15 February 1929	18 May 1929	1927	Christian X
42nd	17 January 1930; 26 June 1930	19 April 1930; 28 June 1930	1930	Christian X
43rd	14 February 1931	(dissolution) 14 April 1931	1930	Christian X
44th (extra-assembly)	15 July 1931	24 August 1931	1931	Christian X
45th	15 February 1932	6 June 1932	1931	Christian X
46th	15 February 1933	3 June 1933	1931	Christian X
47th (extra-assembly)	2 November 1933	9 December 1933	1933	Christian X
48th	1 October 1934	22 December 1934	1934	Christian X
49th	15 February 1935; 10 October 1935	4 April 1935; 23 December 1935	1934	Christian X
50th	15 February 1936	9 May 1936	1934	Christian X
51st	15 February 1937	(dissolution) 20 April 1937	1934	Christian X
52nd (extra-assembly)	9 October 1937	22 December 1937	1937	Christian X
53rd	15 February 1938	12 May 1938	1937	Christian X
54th	15 February 1939; 1 November 1939	26 April 1939; 5 January 1940	1937	Christian X
55th	15 February 1940	24 April 1940	1937	Christian X
56th	15 February 1941	17 June 1941	1937	Christian X
57th (extra-assembly)	9 July 1941	10 July 1941	1937	Christian X
58th (extra-assembly)	13 October 1941	21 November 1941	1937	Christian X
59th	16 February 1942 (no continuation)	23 May 1942 (dissolution) 5 July 1942	1937	Christian X
60th (extra-assembly)	4 August 1942	9 September 1942	July 1942	Christian X
61st (extra-assembly)	14 November 1942	14 April 1943	October 1942	Christian X
62nd	15 April 1943; 1 September 1943	21 April 1943; 17 December 1943	October 1942	Christian X
63rd	10 January 1944; 10 June 1944; 2 September 1944	11 March 1944; 20 June 1944; 3 March 1945	October 1942	Sveinn Björnsson
64th	1 October 1945; 1 February 1946	21 December 1945; 29 April 1946	October 1942	Sveinn Björnsson
65th (extra-assembly)	22 July 1946; 19 September 1946	25 July 1946; 9 October 1946	October 1942	Sveinn Björnsson
66th	10 October 1946; 7 January 1947	22 December 1946; 24 May 1947	1946	Sveinn Björnsson
67th	1 October 1947; 20 January 1948	20 December 1947; 24 March 1948	1946	Sveinn Björnsson
68th	11 October 1948; 21 January 1949	20 December 1948; 18 May 1949	1946	Sveinn Björnsson
69th	14 November 1949; 4 January 1950	20 December 1949; 17 May 1950	1949	Sveinn Björnsson
70th	10 October 1950; 8 January 1951	19 December 1950; 7 March 1951	1949	Sveinn Björnsson
71st	1 October 1951; 3 January 1952	20 December 1951; 24 January 1952	1949	Sveinn Björnsson
72nd	1 October 1952; 12 January 1953	19 December 1952; 6 February 1953	1949	Ásgeir Ásgeirsson
73rd	1 October 1953; 5 February 1954	18 December 1953; 14 April 1954	1953	Ásgeir Ásgeirsson
74th	9 October 1954; 4 February 1955	18 December 1954; 11 May 1955	1953	Ásgeir Ásgeirsson
75th	8 October 1955; 5 January 1956	17 December 1955; 28 March 1956	1953	Ásgeir Ásgeirsson
76th	10 October 1956; 21 January 1957	22 December 1956; 31 May 1957	1956	Ásgeir Ásgeirsson
77th	10 October 1957; 4 February 1958	20 December 1957; 4 June 1958	1956	Ásgeir Ásgeirsson
78th	10 October 1958	14 May 1959	1956	Ásgeir Ásgeirsson
79th (extra-assembly)	21 July 1959	15 August 1959	June 1959	Ásgeir Ásgeirsson
80th	20 November 1959; 28 January 1960	7 December 1959; 3 June 1960	October 1959	Ásgeir Ásgeirsson
81st	10 October 1960; 16 January 1961	20 December 1960; 29 March 1961	October 1959	Ásgeir Ásgeirsson
82nd	10 October 1961; 1 February 1962	19 December 1961; 18 April 1962	October 1959	Ásgeir Ásgeirsson
83rd	10 October 1962; 29 January 1963	20 December 1962; 20 April 1963	October 1959	Ásgeir Ásgeirsson
84th	10 October 1963; 16 January 1964	21 December 1963; 14 May 1964	1963	Ásgeir Ásgeirsson
85th	10 October 1964; 1 February 1965	22 December 1964; 12 May 1965	1963	Ásgeir Ásgeirsson
86th	8 October 1965; 7 February 1966	17 December 1965; 5 May 1966	1963	Ásgeir Ásgeirsson
87th	10 October 1966; 1 February 1967	17 December 1966; 19 April 1967	1963	Ásgeir Ásgeirsson
88th	10 October 1967; 16 January 1968	20 December 1967; 20 April 1968	1967	Ásgeir Ásgeirsson
89th	10 October 1968; 7 February 1969	21 December 1968; 17 May 1969	1967	Kristján Eldjárn
90th	10 October 1969; 12 January 1970; 2 March 1970	19 December 1969; 3 February 1970; 4 May 1970	1967	Kristján Eldjárn
91st	10 October 1970; 25 January 1971	18 December 1970; 7 April 1971	1967	Kristján Eldjárn
92nd	11 October 1971; 20 January 1972	21 December 1971; 20 May 1972	1971	Kristján Eldjárn
93rd	10 October 1972; 25 January 1973	21 December 1972; 18 April 1973	1971	Kristján Eldjárn
94th	10 October 1973; 21 January 1974	21 December 1973 (dissolution) 9 May 1974	1971	Kristján Eldjárn
95th (extra-assembly)	18 July 1974	5 September 1974	1971	Kristján Eldjárn
96th	29 October 1974; 27 January 1975	21 December 1974; 16 May 1975	1974	Kristján Eldjárn
97th	10 October 1975; 26 January 1976	20 December 1975; 19 May 1976	1974	Kristján Eldjárn
98th	11 October 1976; 24 January 1977	21 December 1976; 4 May 1977	1974	Kristján Eldjárn
99th	10 October 1977; 23 January 1978	21 December 1977; 6 May 1978	1974	Kristján Eldjárn
100th	10 October 1978; 25 January 1979	22 December 1978; 23 May 1979	1978	Kristján Eldjárn
101st	10 October 1979	(dissolution) 16 October 1979	1978	Kristján Eldjárn
102nd (extra-assembly)	12 December 1979; 8 January 1980	21 December 1979; 29 May 1980	1979	Kristján Eldjárn
103rd	10 October 1980; 26 January 1981	20 December 1980; 25 May 1981	1979	Vigdís Finnbogadóttir
104th	10 October 1981; 20 January 1982	19 December 1981; 7 May 1982	1979	Vigdís Finnbogadóttir
105th	11 October 1982; 17 January 1983	18 December 1982; 14 March 1983	1979	Vigdís Finnbogadóttir
106th	10 October 1983; 23 January 1984	20 December 1983; 22 May 1984	1983	Vigdís Finnbogadóttir
107th	10 October 1984; 28 January 1985	20 December 1984; 21 June 1985	1983	Vigdís Finnbogadóttir
108th	10 October 1985; 27 January 1986	21 December 1985; 23 April 1986	1983	Vigdís Finnbogadóttir
109th	10 October 1986; 13 January 1987	20 December 1986; 19 March 1987	1983	Vigdís Finnbogadóttir
110th	10 October 1987	11 May 1988	1987	Vigdís Finnbogadóttir
111th	10 October 1988; 6 February 1989	6 January 1989; 20 May 1989	1987	Vigdís Finnbogadóttir
112th	10 October 1989; 22 January 1990	22 December 1990; 5 May 1990	1987	Vigdís Finnbogadóttir
113th	10 October 1990; 14 January 1991	21 December 1990; 20 March 1991	1987	Vigdís Finnbogadóttir
114th (extra-assembly)	13 May 1991	31 May 1991	1987	Vigdís Finnbogadóttir
115th	1 October 1991; 6 January 1992	22 December 1991; 20 May 1992	1991	Vigdís Finnbogadóttir
116th	17 August 1992; 4 January 1993; 10 February 1993	22 December 1992; 14 January 1993; 9 May 1993	1991	Vigdís Finnbogadóttir
117th	1 October 1993; 24 January 1994; 16 June 1994	21 December 1993; 11 May 1994; 17 June 1994	1991	Vigdís Finnbogadóttir
118th	1 October 1994; 25 January 1995	30 December 1994; 25 February 1995	1991	Vigdís Finnbogadóttir
119th (extra-assembly)	16 May 1995	15 June 1995	1991	Vigdís Finnbogadóttir
120th	2 October 1995; 30 January 1996	22 December 1995; 5 June 1996	1995	Vigdís Finnbogadóttir
121st	1 October 1996; 28 January 1997	20 December 1996; 17 May 1997	1995	Ólafur Ragnar Grímsson
122nd	1 October 1997; 27 January 1998	20 December 1997; 5 June 1998	1995	Ólafur Ragnar Grímsson
123rd	1 October 1998; 6 January 1999; 2 February 1999; 25 March 1999	20 December 1998; 13 January 1999; 11 March 1999; 25 March 1999	1995	Ólafur Ragnar Grímsson
124th (extra-assembly)	8 June 1999	16 June 1999	1995	Ólafur Ragnar Grímsson
125th	1 October 1999; 1 February 2000; 2 July 2000	21 December 1999; 13 May 2000; 2 July 2000	1999	Ólafur Ragnar Grímsson
126th	2 October 2000; 15 January 2001; 8 February 2001	16 December 2000; 24 January 2001; 20 May 2001	1999	Ólafur Ragnar Grímsson
127th	1 October 2001; 22 January 2002	14 December 2001; 3 May 2002	1999	Ólafur Ragnar Grímsson
128th	1 October 2002; 21 January 2003	13 December 2002; 15 March 2003	1999	Ólafur Ragnar Grímsson
129th (extra-assembly)	26 May 2003	27 May 2003	1999	Ólafur Ragnar Grímsson
130th	1 October 2003; 28 January 2004; 5 July 2004	15 December 2003; 28 May 2004; 22 July 2004	2003	Ólafur Ragnar Grímsson
131st	1 October 2004; 24 January 2005	10 December 2004; 11 May 2005	2003	Ólafur Ragnar Grímsson
132nd	1 October 2005; 17 January 2006; 30 May 2006	9 December 2005; 4 May 2006; 3 June 2006	2003	Ólafur Ragnar Grímsson
133rd	2 October 2006; 15 January 2007	9 December 2006; 18 March 2007	2003	Ólafur Ragnar Grímsson
134th (extra-assembly)	31 May 2007	13 June 2007	2003	Ólafur Ragnar Grímsson
135th	1 October 2007; 15 January 2008	14 December 2007; 29 May 2008	2007	Ólafur Ragnar Grímsson
136th	1 October 2008; 20 January 2009	22 December 2008 (dissolution) 17 April 2009	2007	Ólafur Ragnar Grímsson
137th (extra-assembly)	15 May 2009	28 August 2009	2007	Ólafur Ragnar Grímsson
138th	1 October 2009; 8 January 2010; 29 January 2010; 2 September 2010	30 December 2009; 8 January 2010; 24 June 2010; 28 September 2010	2009	Ólafur Ragnar Grímsson
139th	1 October 2010; 17 January 2011; 2 September 2011	18 December 2010; 15 June 2011; 17 September 2011	2009	Ólafur Ragnar Grímsson
140th	1 October 2011; 17 December 2011	16 January 2012; 19 June 2012	2009	Ólafur Ragnar Grímsson
141st	11 September 2012; 22 December 2012	14 January 2013; 28 March 2013	2009	Ólafur Ragnar Grímsson
142nd (extra-assembly)	6 June 2013; 10 September 2013	5 July 2013; 18 September 2013	2013	Ólafur Ragnar Grímsson
143rd	1 October 2013; 14 January 2014; 18 June 2014	21 December 2013; 16 May 2014; 18 June 2014	2013	Ólafur Ragnar Grímsson
144th	9 September 2014; 20 January 2015	16 December 2014; 3 July 2015	2013	Ólafur Ragnar Grímsson
145th	8 September 2015; 19 January 2016; 8 June 2016; 15 August 2016	19 December 2015; 2 June 2016; 8 June 2016; 13 October 2016	2013	Ólafur Ragnar Grímsson
146th	6 December 2016; 24 January 2017	22 December 2016; 1 June 2017	2016	Guðni Thorlacius Jóhannesson
147th	12 September 2017	27 September 2017	2016	Guðni Thorlacius Jóhannesson
148th	14 December 2017; 22 January 2018; 17 July 2018	30 December 2017; 12 June 2018; 18 July 2018	2017	Guðni Thorlacius Jóhannesson
149th	11 September 2018; 21 January 2019; 28 August 2019	14 December 2018; 20 June 2019; 2 September 2019	2017	Guðni Thorlacius Jóhannesson
150th	10 September 2019; 20 January 2020; 27 August 2020	17 December 2019; 30 June 2020; 4 September 2020	2017	Guðni Thorlacius Jóhannesson
151st	1 October 2020; 18 January 2021; 6 July 2021	18 December 2020; 13 June 2021; 6 July 2021	2017	Guðni Thorlacius Jóhannesson
152nd	23 November 2021; 17 January 2022	28 December 2021; 16 June 2022	2021	Guðni Thorlacius Jóhannesson
153rd	—N/a	—N/a	2021	Guðni Thorlacius Jóhannesson
