= Zahle II Cabinet =

Government of Denmark from 1913 to 1920

Second Zahle Cabinet
- 28th Cabinet of Denmark

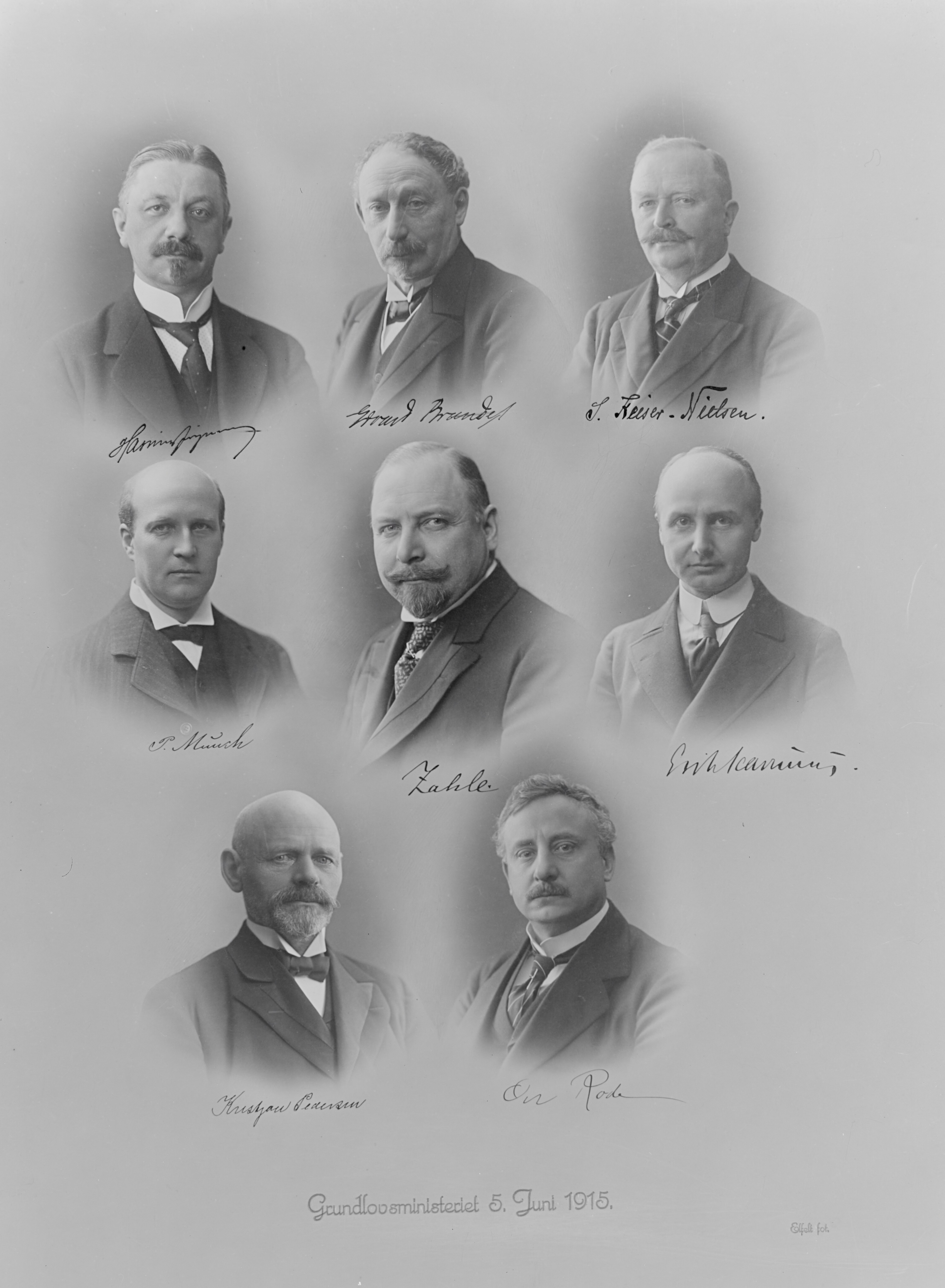
- Original composition of the cabinet
- Date formed: 21 June 1913
- Date dissolved: 29 March 1920

People and organisations
- Head of state: Christian X
- Head of government: Carl Theodor Zahle
- No. of ministers: 17
- Total no. of members: 21
- Member party: Social Liberals

History
- Elections: 1913; 1915; 1918
- Predecessor: Berntsen cabinet
- Successor: Liebe

The Second cabinet of Carl Theodor Zahle was the government of Denmark from 21 June 1913 to 29 March 1920. It replaced the Berntsen cabinet, and was dismissed by Christian X leading to the Easter Crisis of 1920.

== History ==
It was the government which led the country through the First World War and gave women and servants the right to vote. It also saw the passing of the Act of Union, which recognized the Kingdom of Iceland.

== List of ministers ==
The cabinet consisted of these ministers:

Cabinet members
Portfolio	Minister	Took office	Left office	Party
Council President (until 21 April 1918, then Prime Minister) & Minister of Justice	Carl Theodor Zahle	21 June 1913	29 March 1920	Social Liberals
Minister of Foreign Affairs	Edvard Brandes (act.)	21 June 1913	24 June 1913	Social Liberals
Minister of Foreign Affairs	Erik Scavenius	24 June 1913	29 March 1920	Social Liberals
Minister for Finance	Edvard Brandes	21 June 1913	29 March 1920	Social Liberals
Minister of Defence	Peter Rochegune Munch	21 June 1913	29 March 1920	Social Liberals
Kultus Minister	Søren Keiser-Nielsen	21 June 1913	28 April 1916	Social Liberals
Minister for Ecclesiastical Affairs	Thorvald Povlsen	28 April 1916	29 March 1920	Social Liberals
Minister for Education	Søren Keiser-Nielsen	28 April 1916	29 March 1920	Social Liberals
Minister of the Interior	Ove Rode	21 June 1913	29 March 1920	Social Liberals
Minister of Public Works	Jens Hassing-Jørgensen	21 June 1913	29 March 1920	Social Liberals
Minister of Agriculture	Kristjan Pedersen	21 June 1913	29 March 1920	Social Liberals
Minister of Trade and Seafaring (Minister for Commerce from 1 April 1914)	Jens Hassing-Jørgensen (act.)	21 June 1913	28 April 1916	Social Liberals
Minister of Trade and Seafaring (Minister for Commerce from 1 April 1914)	Christopher Hage	28 April 1916	29 March 1920	Social Liberals
Minister without portfolio	Christopher Hage	20 March 1916	28 April 1916	Social Liberals
Minister without portfolio (Control minister)	Jens Christian Christensen	30 September 1916	16 January 1918	Venstre
Minister without portfolio (Control minister)	Christian Michael Rottbøll	30 September 1916	16 January 1918	Free Conservatives
Minister without portfolio (Control minister)	Thorvald Stauning	30 September 1916	16 January 1918	Social Democrats
Minister without portfolio (Control minister)	Hans Peter Hanssen	30 September 1916	16 January 1918	Independent
Minister for South Jutland	Hans Peter Hanssen	30 June 1919	29 March 1920	Independent
Minister for Iceland	Hannes Hafstein	25 July 1912	21 July 1914	Home Rule
Minister for Iceland	Sigurður Eggerz	21 July 1914	4 May 1915	Independence
Minister for Iceland	Einar Arnórsson	4 May 1915	4 January 1917	Independence
Minister for Iceland	Jón Magnússon	4 January 1917	30 November 1918	Home Rule
Minister for Iceland	Sigurður Jónsson	4 January 1917	28 August 1917	Progressive
Minister for Iceland	Björn Kristjansson	4 January 1917	28 August 1917	Progressive
Minister for Iceland	Sigurður Eggerz	28 August 1917	30 November 1918	Independence
Minister of Social Affairs	Thorvald Stauning	18 November 1918	29 March 1920	Social Democrats

Preceded by Berntsen	Cabinet of Denmark; 1913-1920	Succeeded by Liebe
