= Conservatism in Iceland =

Icelandic political ideology

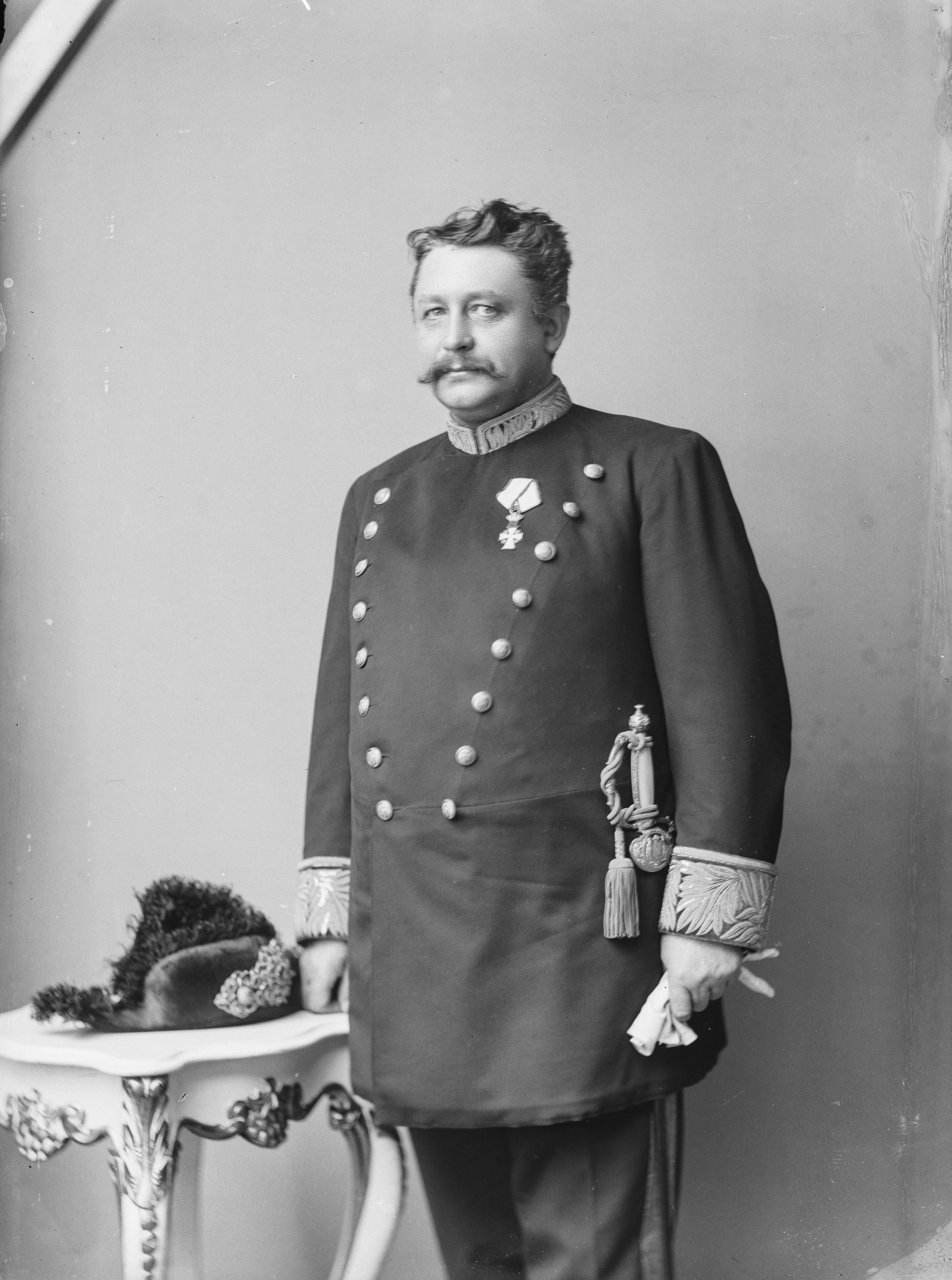
Hannes Hafstein

Conservatism has been the dominant ideology of Iceland's politics since the 20th century, most notably under the Independence Party which has been the largest and most influential party in Icelandic politics since its founding in 1929. Unlike conservatism in many other countries, Icelandic conservatism has historically placed far greater emphasis on economic liberalism, national sovereignty, and institutional stability than on social or moral conservatism. Today it is primarily represented by three parties, namely the liberal conservative Independence Party, the agrarian liberal conservative Progressive Party and the conservative-populist Centre Party.

== History ==
=== Early origins ===
The origins of Icelandic conservatism can be traced to the 19th century during Iceland's struggle for increased autonomy from the Kingdom of Denmark. Early conservative thought was tied to the Icelandic elite, clergy, and educated classes who supported gradual reform, constitutionalism and constitutional monarchy rather than radical political change. Conservative Icelanders were often aligned with Danish authorities and tended to favour stability, legalism and the preservation of Icelandic cultural and religious traditions, especially through the Lutheran Church and rural community life.

During this period, a form of nationalist conservatism emerged as a dominant ideology among many Icelanders seeking greater autonomy while maintaining traditional institutions. Icelandic romantic nationalism, inspired by romantic nationalist ideas from continental Europe, and exemplified by figures such as Jón Sigurðsson, mixed liberal and conservative values in advocating for Icelandic independence through gradual, legal and peaceful means over revolutionary change.

=== 20th century ===
In the early 20th century, as Iceland achieved home rule (1904) and later sovereignty (1918) within the Danish crown, conservative politics became more organised. The Home Rule Party was founded in 1909, followed by the Conservative Party in 1924. Both promoted a pragmatic and gradual approach to independence. In 1929, the Conservative Party merged with the Liberal Party to form the Independence Party.

After the Independence Party was formed, it quickly became the largest party in the country, averaging around 40–50% of the vote share and consistently winning the popular vote from 1930 until 2009. Unlike conservative parties elsewhere in the Nordic region, it developed strong support among working-class voters, due to its focus on national independence, economic opportunity and class collaboration rather than class conflict. Whilst initially favouring limited government intervention, the party gradually accepted the expansion of the welfare state after the Second World War and adapted to the Nordic model, supporting public healthcare, education, and social security alongside private enterprise.

Foreign and security policy became a big element of Icelandic conservatism during the Cold war. The Independence party was a strong supporter of Iceland's alignment with the Western bloc, supporting NATO membership in 1949 and backing the 1951 defence agreement with the United States, which established a long-term American military presence at Keflavík. This Atlanticist and anti-communist stance reinforced the party's image as a party of stability, security and international alignment with Western democracies.

Economic policy in the post-war period combined the market-oriented principles with corporatist arrangements and state involvements in key sectors. Conservatives supported nationalisation and public investment in infrastructure when it was seen as beneficial for development, whilst maintaining a general commitment to private ownership and competition. Fisheries policy became particularly central, conservative governments defended Iceland's control over fishing grounds in the Cod Wars and later supported the introduction of individual transferable quotas, aligning the party closely with fishing industry interests and reinforcing its emphasis on national sovereignty.

=== 21st century ===
The 2008 Icelandic financial crisis marked a major turning point for Icelandic conservatism and the Independence Party. The collapse of the country's major banks led to a public backlash against the political and economic establishment, and the Independence Party, which had led the government prior to the crisis was criticised by many for supporting the deregulation that preceded the collapse as well as for the close ties between politicians and financiers. In the 2009 parliamentary elections, the party received 23.7% of the vote, its worst result up to that point.

In 2016, a wing of the Independence Party that supported EU membership broke off from the party to form the Liberal Reform Party (Viðreisn). And in 2017, leadership disputes within the Progressive Party between Sigurður Ingi and Sigmundur Davíð led supporters of Sigmundur to form the Centre Party.

Since then, support has fluctuated between 20–25%, though the party remains a central actor in Icelandic politics. It returned to government in 2013 with the Progressive party and has been part of coalition governments with the Left-Greens. In the 2024 parliamentary elections they received just 19.4% of the vote. The party continues to advocate economic liberalism, lower taxes, and national sovereignty, particularly regarding Iceland's relationship with the European Union, although there is internal debate on the EU question.

== Positions ==
=== Domestic ===
Icelandic conservatism is characterised by a pragmatic blend of economic liberalism, national sovereignty, and acceptance of the Nordic welfare state. Conservatives generally advocate lower taxes, deregulation, and support for private enterprise as drivers of economic growth, while also endorsing public healthcare, education, and social welfare provisions.

Socially, Icelandic conservatism has traditionally been very liberal by international standards. Conservatives have largely supported liberal legislation on issues such as abortion and LGBT rights, reflecting broader societal consensus and the limited role of moral conservatism in Icelandic political culture. However, many conservatives support maintaining the Church of Iceland as the national church, viewing it as a cultural and historical institution rather than a vehicle for strict religious policy.

Environmental and energy policy represents an area of internal tension. Conservatives generally support the development of hydropower and geothermal energy as foundations of economic growth and energy security, while balancing these priorities against environmental protection. Disagreements have emerged both within conservative parties and between conservatives and environmentalist parties, particularly regarding large-scale industrial projects.

=== International ===
Conservatives emphasise Iceland’s sovereignty and control over key national resources, particularly fisheries. They are generally sceptical of European Union membership, citing concerns over loss of autonomy in areas such as fisheries management, trade policy, immigration, and foreign affairs. While opinions vary within conservative parties, opposition to EU membership has remained the dominant position.

Icelandic conservatism has also been shaped by a strong Atlanticist tradition, favouring close relations with the United States and other Western allies. Support for NATO membership and participation in Western security structures has remained a consistent feature of conservative foreign policy thinking, even after the closure of the US military base in 2006.
