= Prime Minister of Iceland =

Head of government

- Forsætisráðherra Íslands (Icelandic)
- Coat of arms of Iceland

- State flag of Iceland

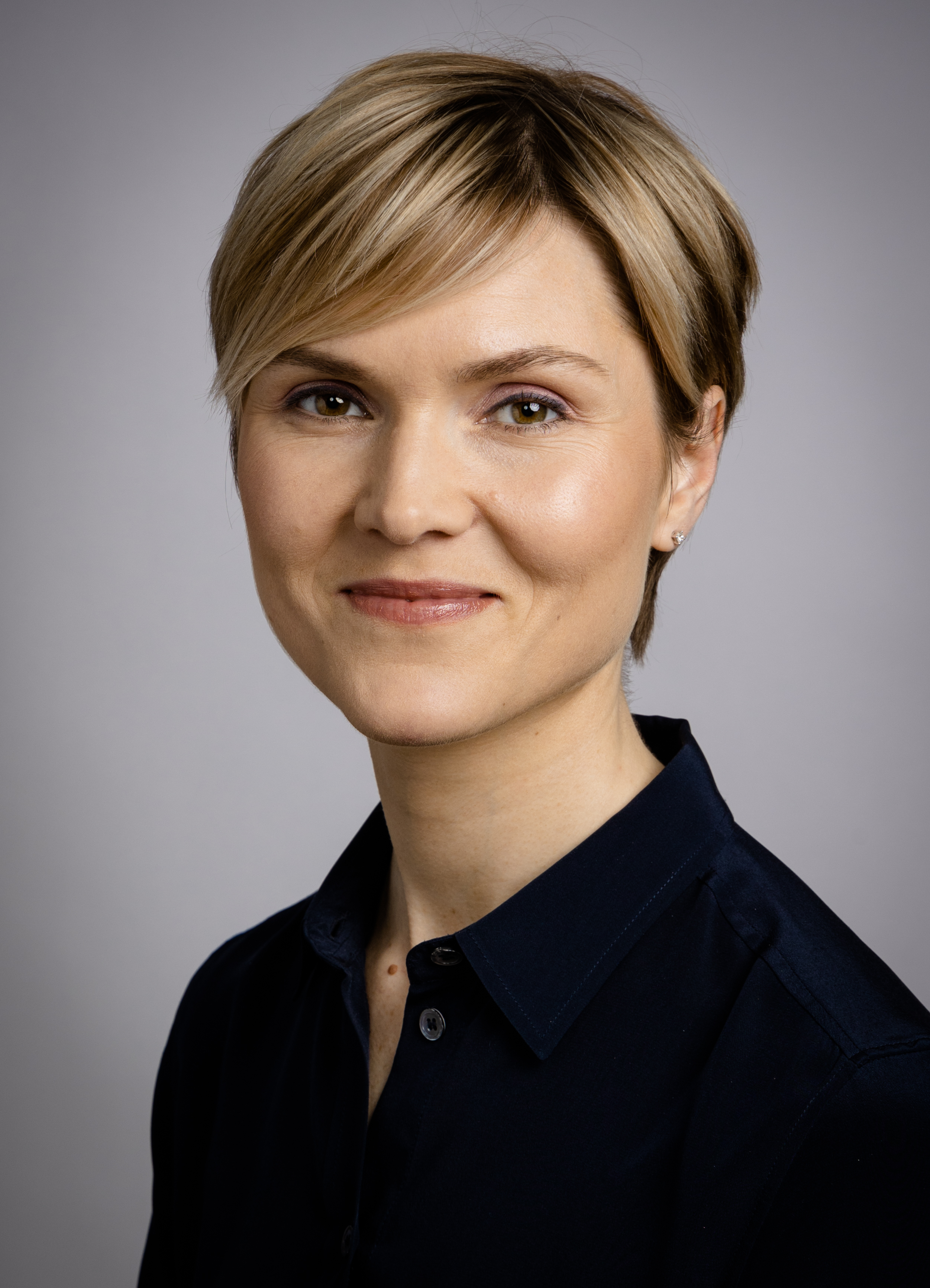
- Incumbent; Kristrún Frostadóttir since 21 December 2024
- Prime Minister's Office
- Style: Madam Prime Minister (informal); Her Excellency (diplomatic)
- Member of: State Council of Iceland; Cabinet of Iceland
- Seat: Reykjavík, Iceland
- Appointer: President
- Term length: No term limit
- Constituting instrument: Constitution of Iceland; Law on the Cabinet of Iceland
- Precursor: Minister for Iceland
- Inaugural holder: Hannes Hafstein (under Home Rule as Minister for Iceland); Jón Magnússon (under Kingdom of Iceland)
- Formation: 1 February 1904; 122 years ago
- Salary: 2,021,825 kr/US$ 14,038 monthly
- Website: eng.forsaetisraduneyti.is (in English) forsaetisraduneyti.is (in Icelandic)

The prime minister of Iceland (Icelandic: Forsætisráðherra Íslands) is head of government of the country of Iceland. The prime minister is appointed formally by the president and exercises executive authority along with the cabinet subject to parliamentary support.

== Official title ==
The title of Iceland's head of government in Icelandic is forsætisráðherra. Translated, this means "minister-president" (Note: The word forsætisráðherra is a combination of forsæti, which means "presidency", and ráðherra, which is the Icelandic term for "minister". The word forsæti is derived from the Icelandic term for "president", forseti, which means one who sits foremost (sá sem fremst situr) in Old Norse/Icelandic or literally fore-sitter, while the word ráðherra literally means lord of the council.). This is different from the heads of government of other Nordic states, whose official titles are literally translated as "minister of state" (statsminister; in Icelandic, the literal translation would be ríkisráðherra). However, since "prime minister" or "premier" is the more usual title in a parliamentary system for a head of government in English-speaking nations, the title is translated as "prime minister" by most English sources.

== Constitutional basis ==
The prime minister is appointed by the president under the Constitution of Iceland, Section II Article 17, and chairs the Cabinet of Iceland:

Fundunum stjórnar sá ráðherra, er forseti lýðveldisins hefur kvatt til forsætis, og nefnist hann forsætisráðherra.
The [cabinet] meetings shall be presided over by the Minister called upon by the President of the Republic to do so, who is designated Prime Minister.

== Locations ==
The prime minister's office is located in the Governing Council (Stjórnarráðið), Reykjavik, where their secretariat is based and where cabinet meetings are held. The prime minister has a summer residence, Þingvallabær in Þingvellir. The prime minister also has a reception house in Tjarnargata, Reykjavik, which was the prime ministerial residence until 1943.

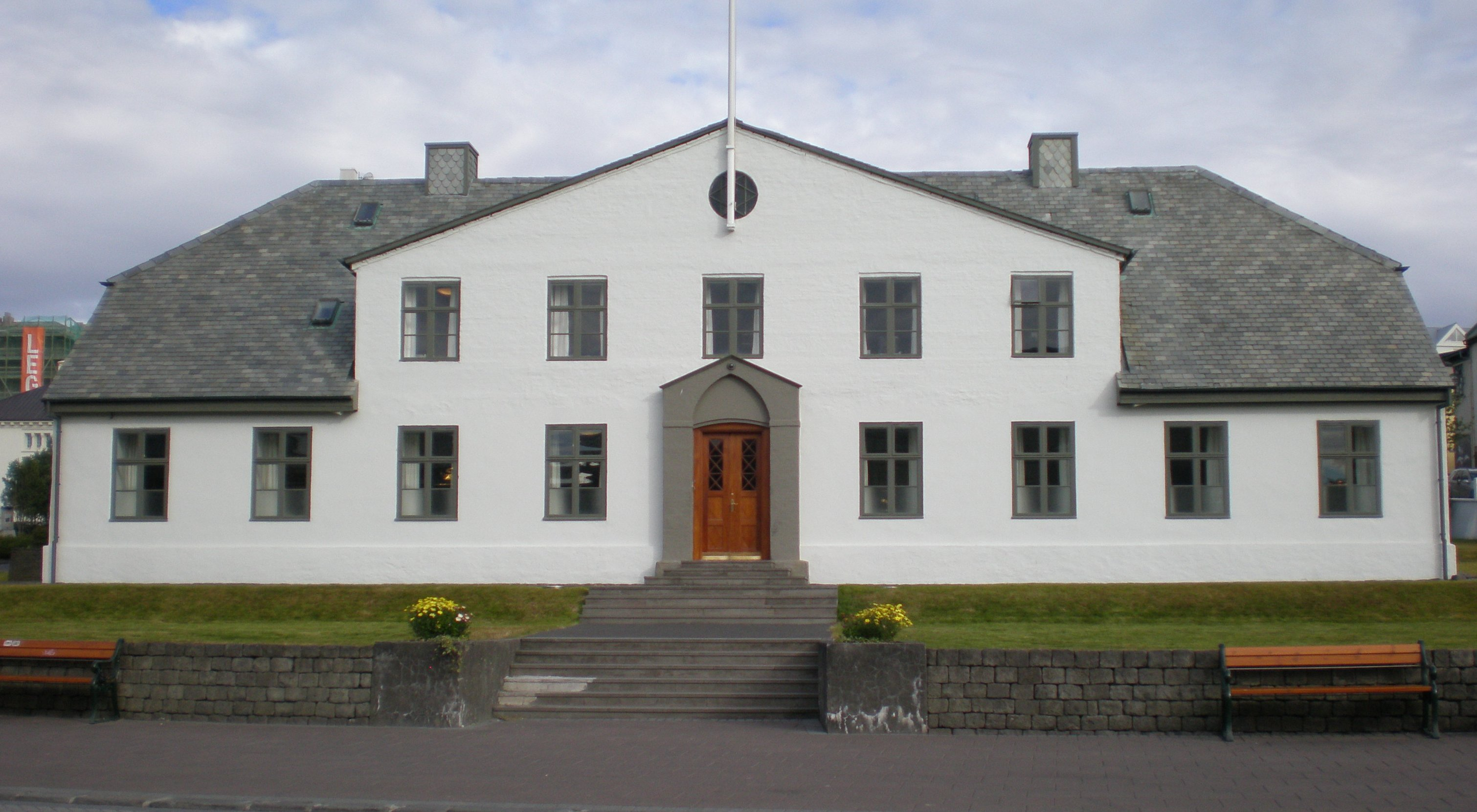
Stjórnarráðið in Reykjavík, the Prime Minister's Office

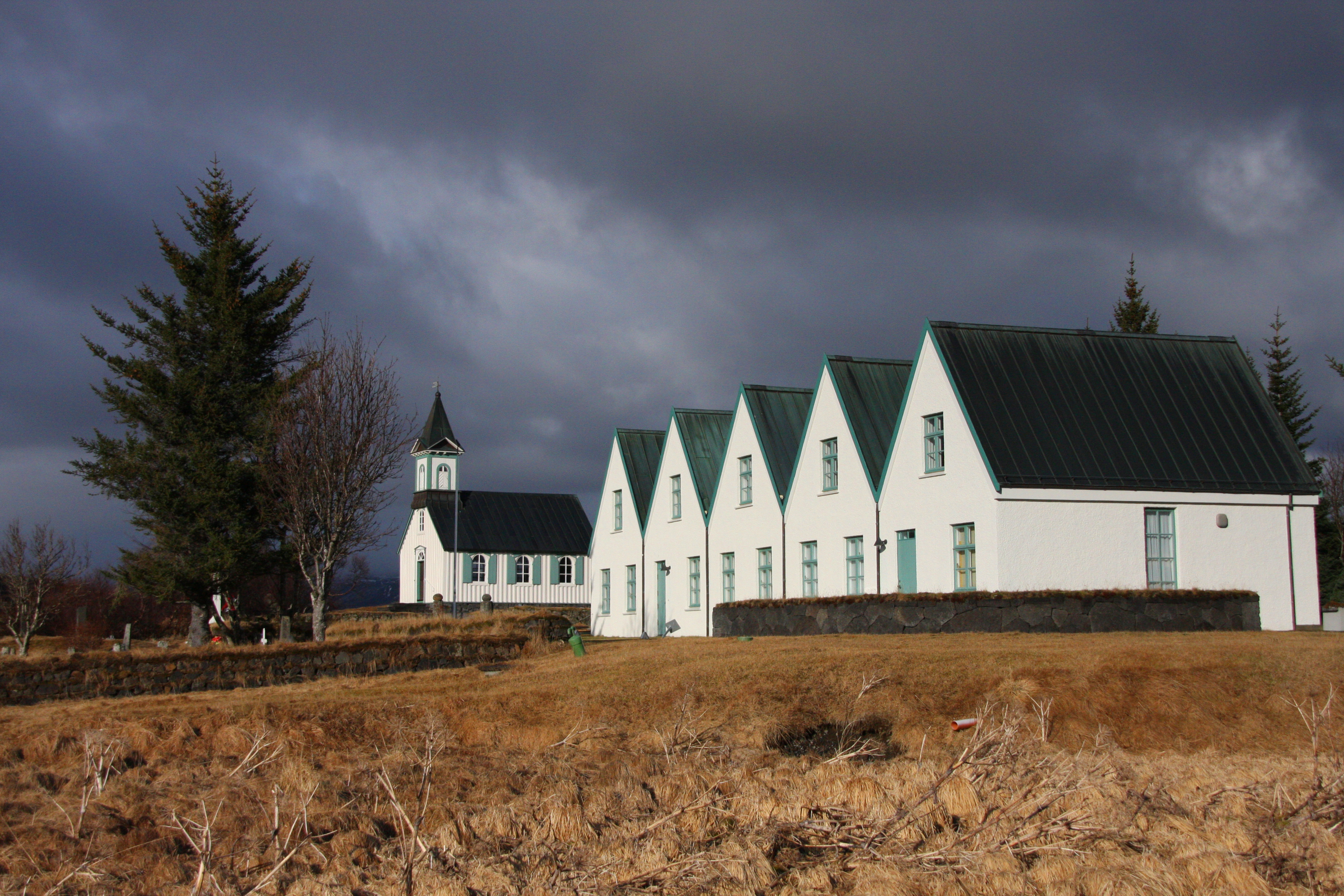
Þingvallabær, the Prime Minister's summer residence

== List of officeholders ==
=== Home Rule (1904–1918) ===
Despite Hannes Hafstein being a Minister for Iceland, he and his successors are considered to be the first Prime Ministers of Iceland by the national government.

No.	Portrait	Name (born–died)	Term of office			Political party	Government	Ref.
No.	Portrait	Name (born–died)	Took office	Left office	Time in office	Political party	Government	Ref.
1		Hannes Hafstein (1861–1922); MP for Eyjafjarðarsýsla	1 February 1904	31 March 1909	5 years, 58 days	Home Rule Party	Deuntzer; Christensen I–II; Neergaard I	
2		Björn Jónsson (1846–1912); MP for Barðastrandarsýsla	31 March 1909	14 March 1911	1 year, 348 days	Independence Party	Neergaard I Holstein-Ledreborg; Zahle I Berntsen	
3		Kristján Jónsson (1852–1926); MP for Borgarfjarðarsýsla	14 March 1911	25 July 1912	1 year, 133 days	Independent	Berntsen	
(1)		Hannes Hafstein (1861–1922); MP for Eyjafjarðarsýsla	25 July 1912	21 July 1914	1 year, 361 days	Union Party	Berntsen; Zahle II	
4		Sigurður Eggerz (1875–1945); MP for West Skaftafellssýsla	21 July 1914	4 May 1915	287 days	Independence Party	Zahle II	
5		Einar Arnórsson (1880–1955); MP for Árnessýsla	4 May 1915	4 January 1917	1 year, 245 days	Independence Party – Langsum	Zahle II	

=== Kingdom (1918–1944) ===
Political party: Home Rule Independence Conservative Progressive Independent

No.	Portrait	Name (birth–death) Constituency	Term of office			Party	Elected	Cabinet coalition	Monarch (reign)
No.	Portrait	Name (birth–death) Constituency	Took office	Left office	Time in office	Party	Elected	Cabinet coalition	Monarch (reign)
6		Jón Magnússon (1859–1926); MP for Reykjavík until 1920 not in Parliament from 1920	4 January 1917	7 March 1922	5 years, 62 days	Home Rule Party	Oct. 1916	Magnússon I HP–IP–PP	Kristján X (1918–1944)
6		Jón Magnússon (1859–1926); MP for Reykjavík until 1920 not in Parliament from 1920	4 January 1917	7 March 1922	5 years, 62 days	Home Rule Party	1919	Magnússon II; HP–others	Kristján X (1918–1944)
(4)		Sigurður Eggerz (1875–1945); MP without constituency	7 March 1922	22 March 1924	2 years, 15 days	Independence Party	–	Eggerz; IP–others	Kristján X (1918–1944)
(6)		Jón Magnússon (1859–1926); MP without constituency	22 March 1924	23 June 1926 #	2 years, 93 days	Conservative Party	1923	Magnússon III; CP	Kristján X (1918–1944)
7		Magnús Guðmundsson; Acting (1879–1937); MP for Skagafjarðarsýsla	23 June 1926	8 July 1926	15 days	Conservative Party; CP	–	Magnússon III; CP	Kristján X (1918–1944)
8		Jón Þorláksson (1877–1935); MP without constituency	8 July 1926	28 August 1927	1 year, 51 days	Conservative Party	–	Þorláksson; CP	Kristján X (1918–1944)
9		Tryggvi Þórhallsson (1889–1935); MP for Strandasýsla	28 August 1927	3 June 1932	4 years, 280 days	Progressive Party	1927	Þórhallsson; PP	Kristján X (1918–1944)
9		Tryggvi Þórhallsson (1889–1935); MP for Strandasýsla	28 August 1927	3 June 1932	4 years, 280 days	Progressive Party	1931	Þórhallsson; PP	Kristján X (1918–1944)
10		Ásgeir Ásgeirsson (1894–1972); MP for West Ísafjarðarsýsla	3 June 1932	28 July 1934	2 years, 55 days	Progressive Party	–	Ásgeirsson; PP–IP–Peasants	Kristján X (1918–1944)
10		Ásgeir Ásgeirsson (1894–1972); MP for West Ísafjarðarsýsla	3 June 1932	28 July 1934	2 years, 55 days	Progressive Party	1933	Ásgeirsson; PP–IP–Peasants	Kristján X (1918–1944)
11		Hermann Jónasson (1896–1976); MP for Strandasýsla	28 July 1934	16 May 1942	7 years, 292 days	Progressive Party	1934	Jónasson I PP–SDP	Kristján X (1918–1944)
11		Hermann Jónasson (1896–1976); MP for Strandasýsla	28 July 1934	16 May 1942	7 years, 292 days	Progressive Party	1937	Jónasson II; PP	Kristján X (1918–1944)
11		Hermann Jónasson (1896–1976); MP for Strandasýsla	28 July 1934	16 May 1942	7 years, 292 days	Progressive Party	–	Jónasson III; PP–IP–SDP	Kristján X (1918–1944)
11		Hermann Jónasson (1896–1976); MP for Strandasýsla	28 July 1934	16 May 1942	7 years, 292 days	Progressive Party	–	Jónasson IV; PP–IP–SDP	Sveinn; Björnsson (as Regent for Kristján X) (1941–1944)
12		Ólafur Thors (1892–1964); MP for Gullbringu and Kjósarsýsla	16 May 1942	16 December 1942	214 days	Independence Party	Jul. 1942	Thors I IP	Sveinn; Björnsson (as Regent for Kristján X) (1941–1944)
12		Ólafur Thors (1892–1964); MP for Gullbringu and Kjósarsýsla	16 May 1942	16 December 1942	214 days	Independence Party	Oct. 1942	Thors I IP	Sveinn; Björnsson (as Regent for Kristján X) (1941–1944)
13		Björn Þórðarson (1879–1963); Not in Parliament	16 December 1942	21 October 1944	1 year, 310 days	Independent	–	Þórðarson	Sveinn; Björnsson (as Regent for Kristján X) (1941–1944)

=== Republic (1944–present) ===
Political party: Independence Progressive Social Democratic Party Social Democratic Alliance Left-Green

No.	Portrait	Name (birth–death) Constituency	Term of office			Party	Elected	Cabinet coalition	President(s) (term)
No.	Portrait	Name (birth–death) Constituency	Took office	Left office	Time in office	Party	Elected	Cabinet coalition	President(s) (term)
(12)		Ólafur Thors (1892–1964); MP for Gullbringu and Kjósarsýsla	21 October 1944	4 February 1947	2 years, 106 days	Independence Party	–	Thors II; IP–SDP–SP	Sveinn; Björnsson (1944–1952)
(12)		Ólafur Thors (1892–1964); MP for Gullbringu and Kjósarsýsla	21 October 1944	4 February 1947	2 years, 106 days	Independence Party	1946	Thors II; IP–SDP–SP	Sveinn; Björnsson (1944–1952)
14		Stefán Jóhann Stefánsson (1894–1980); MP for Eyjafjarðarsýsla	4 February 1947	6 December 1949	2 years, 305 days	Social Democratic Party	–	Stefánsson; IP–SDP–SP	Sveinn; Björnsson (1944–1952)
(12)		Ólafur Thors (1892–1964); MP for Gullbringu and Kjósarsýsla	6 December 1949	14 March 1950	98 days	Independence Party	1949	Thors III; IP	Sveinn; Björnsson (1944–1952)
15		Steingrímur Steinþórsson (1893–1966); MP for Skagafjarðarsýsla	14 March 1950	11 September 1953	3 years, 181 days	Progressive Party	–	Steinþórsson; PP–IP	Sveinn; Björnsson (1944–1952)
(12)		Ólafur Thors (1892–1964); MP for Gullbringu and Kjósarsýsla	11 September 1953	24 July 1956	2 years, 305 days	Independence Party	1953	Thors IV; PP–IP	Ásgeir; Ásgeirsson (1952–1968)
(11)		Hermann Jónasson (1896–1976); MP for Strandasýsla	24 July 1956	23 December 1958	2 years, 164 days	Progressive Party	1956	Jónasson V PP–SDP–PA	Ásgeir; Ásgeirsson (1952–1968)
16		Emil Jónsson (1902–1986); MP for Hafnarfjörður	23 December 1958	20 November 1959	332 days	Social Democratic Party	Jun. 1959	Jónsson; SDP	Ásgeir; Ásgeirsson (1952–1968)
(12)		Ólafur Thors (1892–1964); MP for Gullbringu and Kjósarsýsla	20 November 1959	8 September 1961	1 year, 292 days	Independence Party	Oct. 1959	Thors V IP–SDP	Ásgeir; Ásgeirsson (1952–1968)
–		Bjarni Benediktsson (1908–1970) acting MP for Reykjavík	8 September 1961	31 December 1961	114 days	Independence Party	–	Thors V IP–SDP	Ásgeir; Ásgeirsson (1952–1968)
(12)		Ólafur Thors (1892–1964); MP for Gullbringu and Kjósarsýsla	1 January 1962	14 November 1963	1 year, 317 days	Independence Party	–	Thors V IP–SDP	Ásgeir; Ásgeirsson (1952–1968)
17		Bjarni Benediktsson (1908–1970); MP for Reykjavík	14 November 1963	10 July 1970 #	6 years, 238 days	Independence Party	1963	Benediktsson; IP–SDP	Ásgeir; Ásgeirsson (1952–1968)
17		Bjarni Benediktsson (1908–1970); MP for Reykjavík	14 November 1963	10 July 1970 #	6 years, 238 days	Independence Party	1967	Benediktsson; IP–SDP	Kristján; Eldjárn (1968–1980)
–		Jóhann Hafstein (1915–1980); MP for Reykjavík	10 July 1970	10 October 1970	92 days	Independence Party	–	Hafstein; IP–SDP	Kristján; Eldjárn (1968–1980)
18		Jóhann Hafstein (1915–1980); MP for Reykjavík	10 October 1970	14 July 1971	277 days	Independence Party	–	Hafstein; IP–SDP	Kristján; Eldjárn (1968–1980)
19		Ólafur Jóhannesson (1913–1984); MP for Northwestern	14 July 1971	28 August 1974	3 years, 45 days	Progressive Party	1971	Jóhannesson I PP–PA–LL	Kristján; Eldjárn (1968–1980)
20		Geir Hallgrímsson (1925–1990); MP for Reykjavík	28 August 1974	1 September 1978	4 years, 4 days	Independence Party	1974	Hallgrímsson; IP–PP	Kristján; Eldjárn (1968–1980)
(19)		Ólafur Jóhannesson (1913–1984); MP for Northwestern	1 September 1978	15 October 1979	1 year, 44 days	Progressive Party	1978	Jóhannesson II; PP–PA	Kristján; Eldjárn (1968–1980)
21		Benedikt Gröndal (1924–2010); MP for Reykjavík	15 October 1979	8 February 1980	116 days	Social Democratic Party	1979	Sigurðsson Gröndal; SDP	Kristján; Eldjárn (1968–1980)
22		Gunnar Thoroddsen (1910–1983); MP for Reykjavík	8 February 1980	26 May 1983	3 years, 107 days	Independence Party (*Gunnar's faction)	–	Thoroddsen; IP*–PP–PA	Vigdís; Finnbogadóttir (1980–1996)
23		Steingrímur Hermannsson (1928–2010); MP for Westfjords	26 May 1983	8 July 1987	4 years, 43 days	Progressive Party	1983	Hermannsson I PP–IP	Vigdís; Finnbogadóttir (1980–1996)
24		Þorsteinn Pálsson (born 1947); MP for Southern	8 July 1987	28 September 1988	1 year, 82 days	Independence Party	1987	Pálsson; IP–PP–SDP	Vigdís; Finnbogadóttir (1980–1996)
(23)		Steingrímur Hermannsson (1928–2010); MP for Reykjanes	28 September 1988	30 April 1991	2 years, 214 days	Progressive Party	–	Hermannsson II; PP–SDP–PA	Vigdís; Finnbogadóttir (1980–1996)
(23)		Steingrímur Hermannsson (1928–2010); MP for Reykjanes	28 September 1988	30 April 1991	2 years, 214 days	Progressive Party	–	Hermannsson III; PP–SDP–PA–CiP	Vigdís; Finnbogadóttir (1980–1996)
25		Davíð Oddsson (1948–2026); MP for Reykjavík until 2003; MP for Reykjavík North from 2003	30 April 1991	15 September 2004	13 years, 138 days	Independence Party	1991	Oddsson I IP–SDP	Vigdís; Finnbogadóttir (1980–1996)
25		Davíð Oddsson (1948–2026); MP for Reykjavík until 2003; MP for Reykjavík North from 2003	30 April 1991	15 September 2004	13 years, 138 days	Independence Party	1995	Oddsson II; IP–PP	Ólafur; Ragnar; Grímsson (1996–2016)
25		Davíð Oddsson (1948–2026); MP for Reykjavík until 2003; MP for Reykjavík North from 2003	30 April 1991	15 September 2004	13 years, 138 days	Independence Party	1999	Oddsson III; IP–PP	Ólafur; Ragnar; Grímsson (1996–2016)
25		Davíð Oddsson (1948–2026); MP for Reykjavík until 2003; MP for Reykjavík North from 2003	30 April 1991	15 September 2004	13 years, 138 days	Independence Party	2003	Oddsson IV; IP–PP	Ólafur; Ragnar; Grímsson (1996–2016)
26		Halldór Ásgrímsson (1947–2015); MP for Reykjavík North	15 September 2004	15 June 2006	1 year, 273 days	Progressive Party	–	Ásgrímsson; IP–PP	Ólafur; Ragnar; Grímsson (1996–2016)
27		Geir Haarde (born 1951); MP for Reykjavík South	15 June 2006	1 February 2009	2 years, 231 days	Independence Party	–	Haarde I IP–PP	Ólafur; Ragnar; Grímsson (1996–2016)
27		Geir Haarde (born 1951); MP for Reykjavík South	15 June 2006	1 February 2009	2 years, 231 days	Independence Party	2007	Haarde II; IP–SDA	Ólafur; Ragnar; Grímsson (1996–2016)
28		Jóhanna Sigurðardóttir (born 1942); MP for Reykjavík North	1 February 2009	23 May 2013	4 years, 111 days	Social Democratic Alliance	–	Sigurðardóttir I SDA–LGM	Ólafur; Ragnar; Grímsson (1996–2016)
28		Jóhanna Sigurðardóttir (born 1942); MP for Reykjavík North	1 February 2009	23 May 2013	4 years, 111 days	Social Democratic Alliance	2009	Sigurðardóttir II; SDA–LGM	Ólafur; Ragnar; Grímsson (1996–2016)
29		Sigmundur Davíð Gunnlaugsson (born 1975); MP for Northeast	23 May 2013	7 April 2016	2 years, 319 days	Progressive Party	2013	Gunnlaugsson; PP–IP	Ólafur; Ragnar; Grímsson (1996–2016)
30		Sigurður Ingi Jóhannsson (born 1962); MP for South	7 April 2016	11 January 2017	280 days	Progressive Party	–	Jóhannsson; PP–IP	Guðni; Thorlacius; Jóhannesson (2016–2024)
31		Bjarni Benediktsson (born 1970); MP for Southwest	11 January 2017	30 November 2017	323 days	Independence Party	2016	Benediktsson I IP–C–BF	Guðni; Thorlacius; Jóhannesson (2016–2024)
32		Katrín Jakobsdóttir (born 1976); MP for Reykjavík North	30 November 2017	9 April 2024	6 years, 131 days	Left-Green Movement	2017	Jakobsdóttir I LGM–IP–PP	Guðni; Thorlacius; Jóhannesson (2016–2024)
32		Katrín Jakobsdóttir (born 1976); MP for Reykjavík North	30 November 2017	9 April 2024	6 years, 131 days	Left-Green Movement	2021	Jakobsdóttir II; LGM–IP–PP	Guðni; Thorlacius; Jóhannesson (2016–2024)
(31)		Bjarni Benediktsson (born 1970); MP for Southwest	9 April 2024	21 December 2024	256 days	Independence Party	–	Benediktsson II; LGM–IP–PP	Halla; Tómasdóttir (2024–present)
33		Kristrún Frostadóttir (born 1988); MP for Reykjavík South	21 December 2024	Incumbent	1 year, 260 days	Social Democratic Alliance	2024	Frostadóttir; SDA–RP–PeP	Halla; Tómasdóttir (2024–present)

== See also ==
- List of rulers of Iceland
- Cabinet of Iceland
