= List of newspapers in Iceland =

Iceland currently has a single daily newspaper in print, along with other less frequently published national and local newspapers. The number of national daily newspapers in Iceland was just five in 1950 through 1965. In the 21st century, many local and national newspapers moved entirely to online news media. All print newspapers in Iceland also have online editions. This is a list of both current and defunct newspapers in Iceland:

== Daily print newspapers ==
- Morgunblaðið – founded in 1913

== Weekly print newspapers ==
- Austurglugginn - weekly newspaper serving East Iceland founded in 2002
- Dagskráin - weekly newspaper serving South Iceland, founded in 1968
- Feykir – weekly regional newspaper for the North-West of Iceland founded in 1981
- Skessuhorn – weekly news for the West Coast of Iceland; founded in 1998
- Tígull - local newspaper for Vestmannaeyjar
- Viðskiptablaðið – weekly business newspaper, founded in 1994
- Vikublaðið – weekly news for the North of Iceland; Founded in 2020 with the merge of Skarpur and Vikudagur

== Other print newspapers ==
- Bændablaðið – national newspaper focused on rural affairs, founded in 1995
- Breiðholtsblaðið - monthly local newspaper
- Eyjafréttir – local newspaper for Vestmannaeyjar; founded in 1974 as Fréttir
- Heimildin – founded in 2023 with the merger of Stundin and Kjarninn
- Iceland Review - English language magazine, founded in 1963
- Nesblaðið - monthly local newspaper
- The Reykjavík Grapevine – English language newspaper; publishes some 18 issues a year
- Vesturbæjarblaðið - monthly local newspaper

== Online media ==
- Austurfrétt – regional online newspaper for eastern Iceland
- Akureyri.net - serving the Akureyri area
- Fjarðarfréttir – online newspaper focused on the town of Hafnarfjörður. Founded in 1969 as a newspaper
- Bæjarins besta – regional online newspaper for the Westfjords; founded 1984 and a weekly paper until 1997
- DV - founded as Dagblaðið-Vísir in 1981 as a merger, print edition ended in 2021
- Hafnarfréttir – online newspaper focused on the municipality of Ölfus
- IceNews
- Kaffið.is – serving north Iceland
- Local Suðurnes
- RÚV - national broadcaster
- Viljinn
- Víkurfréttir - founded as a local newspaper serving the Reykjanes region in 1980, later moved online.
- Vísir.is

== Defunct ==
- 24 stundir – formerly known as Blaðið
- Alþýðublaðið – social-democratic newspaper;1919–1998
- Austurland – bi-weekly regional newspaper
- Dagblaðið – founded in 1975, merged with Vísir in 1981 as Dagblaðið-Vísir or DV
- Dagur – 1918–1996, 1997–2001
- Dagur - Tíminn – 1996–1997
- Eintak – weekly newspaper;1993–1994
- Fréttablaðið – 2001–2023; daily paper
- Fréttatíminn – weekly news for the capital area, later expanded to three issues a week; 2010–2017
- Helgarpósturinn – weekly newspaper; 1979–1988
- Ísafold weekly newspaper; 1874–1929. Merged with Morgunblaðið
- Kjarninn – online newspaper; merged with Stundin in 2023
- Morgunpósturinn – weekly newspaper later known as Helgarpósturinn; 1994–1997
- Norðurland – bi-weekly regional newspaper
- Pressan – weekly newspaper; 1988–1994
- Stundin – bi-weekly newspapers founded in 2015 by former staff of DV; merged with Kjarninn in 2023
- Suðri – bi-weekly regional newspaper
- Suðurnesjablaðið – bi-weekly regional newspaper
- Tíminn – agrarian daily; the Progressive Party. Merged with Dagur in 1996
- Vestfirska fréttablaðið – weekly regional newspaper; 1975–1996 in the Westfjords
- Vestfirðir – bi-weekly regional newspaper
- Vesturland – bi-weekly regional newspaper
- Vikublaðið – weekly socialist newspaper; 1992–1997
- Vikudagur – weekly news for the North of Iceland; merged with Skarpur in 2020 and became Vikublaðið
- Vísir – founded in 1910 initially as a right-wing newspaper; merged with Dagblaðið in 1981
- Þjóðviljinn – socialist newspaper; 1936–1992

== See also ==
- List of online newspapers in Iceland
