= 1923 Icelandic parliamentary election =

- 27 October 1923
- All 28 seats in the Lower House and 8 of 14 seats in the Upper House of Althing; 15 and 8 seats needed for a majority
- Turnout: 70.90% (▲25.52pp)
Party	Leader	Vote %	Seats	+/–
Upper House (Note: Includes the three seats elected in 1922)
Citizens'	Jón Magnússon	53.59	7	New
Progressive	Þorleifur Jónsson	26.55	5	+1
Independence	Einar Arnórsson	–	2	−2
Lower House
Citizens'	Jón Magnússon	53.59	16	New
Progressive	Þorleifur Jónsson	26.55	10	+3
Social Democratic	Jón Baldvinsson	16.18	1	+1
This lists parties that won seats. See the complete results below.
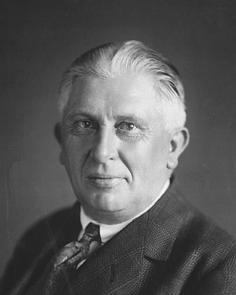

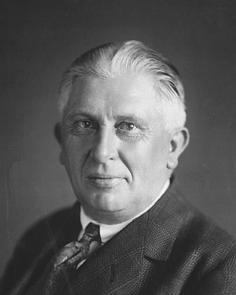
Prime Minister before	Prime Minister after
Sigurður Eggerz; Independence	Sigurður Eggerz; Independence

Parliamentary elections were held in Iceland on 27 October 1923. Voters elected all 28 seats in the Lower House of the Althing and eight of the fourteen seats in Upper House. The Citizens' Party, a loose collection of conservatives, emerged as the largest party in the Lower House, winning 16 of the 28 seats.

== Electoral system ==
This was the first election held following changes made to the electoral system in 1920, in which two extra seats were allocated to Reykjavík. Whilst all seats had previously been elected in one or two-member constituencies, the four-member constituency for Reykjavík was now elected by proportional representation using the D'Hondt method.

The changes also equalised the age limits for voting between men (25) and women and servants (previously 40) at 25.

== Results ==
Party	Votes	%	Seats			
Party	Votes	%	Lower House	+/–	Upper House	+/–
Citizens' Party	16,272	53.59	16	New	7	New
Progressive Party	8,062	26.55	10	+3	5	+1
Social Democratic Party	4,912.5	16.18	1	+1	0	0
Independence Party			–	–	2	–2
Independents	1,115.5	3.67	1	New	0	New
Total	30,362	100.00	28	+2	14	0
Valid votes	30,362	97.48				
Invalid/blank votes	784	2.52				
Total votes	31,146	100.00				
Registered voters/turnout	43,932	70.90				
Source: Nohlen & Stöver
