= 1919 Icelandic parliamentary election =

- 15 November 1919
- All 26 seats in the Lower House and 8 of 14 seats in the Upper House of Althing; 14 and 8 seats needed for a majority
- Turnout: 45.38%
Party	Leader	Vote %	Seats	+/–
Upper House
Home Rule	Jón Magnússon	45.76	6	−1
Independence	Einar Arnórsson	25.28	4	−1
Progressive	Ólafur Briem	22.19	4	+2
Lower House
Home Rule	Jón Magnússon	45.76	10	+2
Independence	Einar Arnórsson	25.28	9	−1
Progressive	Ólafur Briem	22.19	7	+2
This lists parties that won seats. See the complete results below.
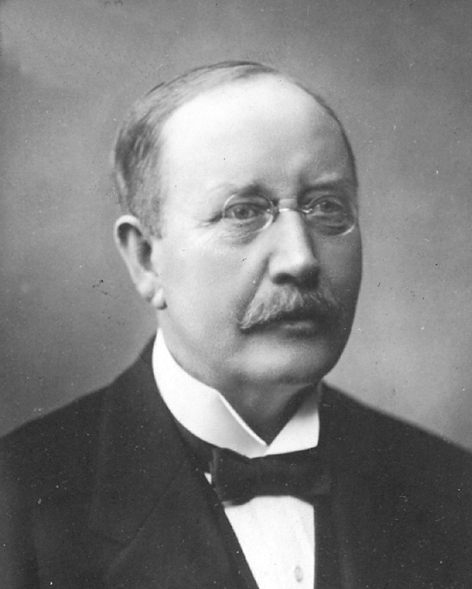

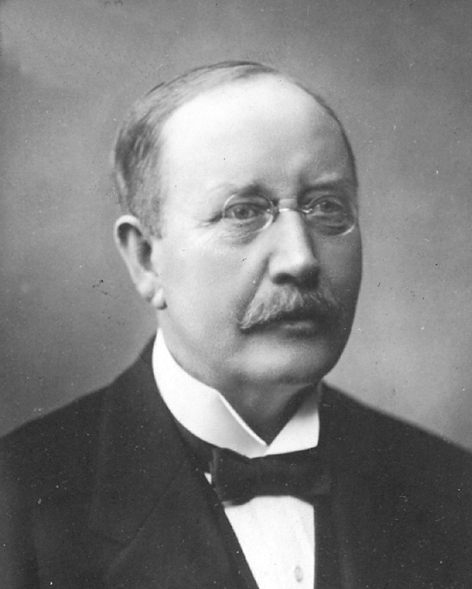
Prime Minister before	Prime Minister after
Jón Magnússon; Home Rule	Jón Magnússon; Home Rule

Parliamentary elections were held in Iceland on 15 November 1919. Voters elected all 26 seats in the Lower House of the Althing and eight of the fourteen seats in Upper House. The Home Rule Party remained the largest party in the Lower House, winning 10 of the 26 seats.

== Results ==
Party	Votes	%	Seats			
Party	Votes	%	Lower House	+/–	Upper House (Note: Includes the six seats elected in 1916)	+/–
Home Rule Party	6,423	45.76	10	+2	6	–1
Independence Party	3,548	25.28	9	+8	4	+2
Progressive Party	3,115	22.19	7	+2	4	+2
Social Democratic Party	949	6.76	0	–1	0	0
Total	14,035	100.00	26	0	14	0
Valid votes	14,035	97.04				
Invalid/blank votes	428	2.96				
Total votes	14,463	100.00				
Registered voters/turnout	31,870	45.38				
Source: Nohlen & Stöver
