= Jónas Kristjánsson (newspaper editor) =

Icelandic newspaper editor (1940–2018)

- Born: 5 February 1940; Reykjavík, Iceland
- Died: 29 June 2018 (aged 78); Reykjavík, Iceland
- Occupations: Journalist, newspaper editor
- Known for: Former editor for Dagblaðið and Dagblaðið Vísir
- Spouse: Kristín Halldórsdóttir (m. 1963; died 2016)

Jónas Kristjánsson (5 February 1940 – 29 June 2018) was an Icelandic writer, newspaper journalist and editor. He was one of the most influential people in the Icelandic newspaper history during the second half of the 20th century and was one of the strongest spokespersons for moving the newspapers publications away from the political parties.

== Early life ==
Jónas was born in Reykjavík, Iceland, to Kristján Jónasson, a doctor, and Anna Pétursdóttir, a bookkeeper. His grandfather was Jónas Kristjánsson, a former member of Alþingi and the founder of Náttúrulækningafélag Íslands. Jónas graduated from Menntaskólinn í Reykjavík in 1959 and from the University of Iceland in 1966.

== Career ==
Jónas was a journalist for Tíminn from 1961 to 1964 and then the editor of Vísir until 1975. Jónas founded the Dagblaðið with others after a conflict in the ownership group of Vísir on his editorial policy. The establishment of Dagblaðið marked a major breakthrough in the publication of newspapers in Iceland as it was the first major paper to be independent of political parties. In 1981, Dagblaðið merged with Vísir to form Dagblaðið Vísir, or DV for short, with Jónas serving there as editor until 2001. In 2002 he was the editor of Fréttablaðið and in 2003 he returned to the DV as a columnist. In 2005 he was again hired as the editor of DV before leaving the post for good in 2006. From 2006 to 2008 he taught journalism at University of Iceland.

== Personal life ==
Jónas married Kristín Halldórsdóttir on 24 December 1963 and together they had four children. Kristín, who was a member of Alþingi from 1983 to 1989 and 1995–1999, died on 14 July 2016.

== Death ==
Jónas died on 29 June 2018 on the cardiology department of the National University Hospital of Iceland.
