= Icelandic parliamentary election, 1916 =

Two parliamentary elections took place in Iceland in 1916:

- Icelandic parliamentary election, August 1916
- Icelandic parliamentary election, October 1916
