= Liberal Party (Iceland, historical) =

Liberal Party Frjálslyndi flokkurinn
- Leader: Sigurður Eggerz
- Founded: 1927
- Dissolved: 25 May 1929
- Preceded by: Independence Party (historical)
- Merged into: Independence Party (modern)
- Ideology: Liberal conservatism Icelandic separatism
- Political position: Centre to centre-right

The Liberal Party (Icelandic: Frjálslyndi flokkurinn) was a short-lived political party in Iceland in the late 1920s.

== History ==
The party was formed in 1927 by a group of MPs sitting under the Independence Party name.

In 1923 the original Independence Party had allied with former members of the recently dissolved Home Rule Party to form the Citizens' Party in order to unite against the new class parties, the Progressive Party (representing the farmers), and the Social Democrats (representing the workers). The majority of the Citizens' Party formed the Conservative Party the following year, but its left wing under former Prime Minister Sigurður Eggerz kept going under the Independence Party name until they formed the Liberal Party in 1927.

The Liberal Party contested the 1927 election, but only got Sigurður elected. In 1929 the party reunited with the Conservatives to establish the new Independence Party, which became the dominant political force in Iceland.
