= 24 stundir =

Icelandic newspaper

24 stundir (24 hours) was the third-largest daily newspaper in Iceland, first published in May 2005. The paper was originally named Blaðið (The Paper), but this was changed in October 2007. Between August and October 2007, its ratings were 42.1%, just behind the Morgunblaðið, which had 43.1%.

As a result of the Icelandic financial crisis, 24 stundir ceased publication on 10 October 2008, resulting in 20 jobs being cut.

== List of editors ==
The newspaper was founded by Karli Garðarsson, Sigurður G. Guðjónsson, and Steini Kára Ragnarsson.

- Karl Garðarsson, was the first editor of the paper, from its first publication on 5 May 2005.
- Ásgeir Sverrisson, from 1 February 2006.
- Sigurjón M. Egilsson, from 8 July 2006.
- Trausti Hafliðason, from December 2006.
- Ólafur Þ. Stephensen, from 1 June 2007
- Gunnhildur Arna Gunnarsdóttir, from 20 May 2008
