= 1922 Icelandic parliamentary election =

- 8 July 1922
- 3 of the 14 seats in the Upper House of Althing
- Turnout: 41.12%
Party	Leader	Vote %	Seats
Home Rule	Jón Magnússon	27.62	1
Progressive	Sveinn Ólafsson	27.10	1
Women's Candidate		22.67	1
This lists parties that won seats. See the complete results below.
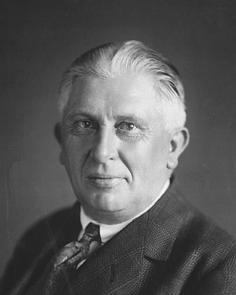

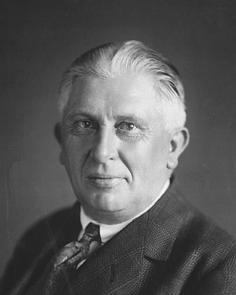
Prime Minister before	Prime Minister after
Sigurður Eggerz; Independence	Sigurður Eggerz; Independence

Elections to the Upper House of the Althing were held in Iceland on 8 July 1922. Following reforms in 1915, the six seats in the Upper House appointed by the monarch were abolished, and replaced with six elected seats. The seats were elected by proportional representation at the national level, using the D'Hondt method. The remaining eight seats were elected along with the Lower House.

== Results ==
Party	Votes	%	Seats
Home Rule Party	3,258	27.62	1
Progressive Party	3,196	27.10	1
Women's Candidate List	2,674	22.67	1
Social Democratic Party	2,033	17.24	0
Independence Party	633	5.37	0
Total	11,794	100.00	3
Valid votes	11,794	98.60	
Invalid/blank votes	168	1.40	
Total votes	11,962	100.00	
Registered voters/turnout	29,094	41.12	
Source: Mackie & Rose, Nohlen & Stöver
