= List of online newspapers in Iceland =

This is a list of online newspapers in Iceland, ordered by their rank on Alexa for Iceland:

| Rank | Online newspaper | Company | Online since | Main topics | Language |
|---|---|---|---|---|---|
| 5 | mbl.is | Árvakur hf | 2 February 1998 | general | Icelandic |
| 6 | visir.is | 365 miðlar ehf | 7 June 2002 | general | Icelandic |
| 9 | ruv.is | Ríkisútvarpið ohf | 17 February 1995 | general | Icelandic |
| 11 | dv.is | DV ehf | 20 November 2003 | general | Icelandic |
| 16 | pressan.is | Vefpressan ehf | 28 February 2009 | general | Icelandic |
| 29 | stundin.is | Útgáfufélagið Stundin ehf | February 2015 | general | Icelandic |
| 46 | kjarninn.is | Kjarninn miðlar ehf | 1 June 2013 | general | Icelandic |
| 52 | vb.is | Myllusetur ehf | 24 September 1997 | Icelandic business | Icelandic |
| 130 | vf.is | Víkurfréttir ehf | 11 June 1998 | general | Icelandic |
| 203 | grapevine.is | Fröken ehf | 21 August 2003 | Icelandic affairs | English |
| 208 | bb.is | Athafnagleði ehf | 7 December 1999 | Icelandic affairs | Icelandic |
| 573 | icelandreview.com | Útgáfufélagið Heimur hf | 1996 | Icelandic affairs | English, German |
| 850 | skessuhorn.is | Skessuhorn ehf | 7 December 1998 | Icelandic affairs | Icelandic |
| 2,344 | feykir.is | Nýprent ehf | 12 February 2008 | Icelandic affairs | Icelandic |
| 3,867 | icenews.is | Nordic eMarketing International ehf | 27 July 2005 | Icelandic and Nordic affairs | English |
Last updated on: 20 November 2016.
