= Dagskrá – Reykjavík =

History of Dagskrá

Dagskrá was the first newspaper published in Iceland, first published in 1896 in Reykjavík. It continued to be published until 1899 as a weekly paper. Einar Benediktsson was the owner of the paper, which supported the policy of Heimastjórnarflokkurinn.

(See Í.A. 1990: 272)
