= Citizens' Party (Iceland, 1923) =

Citizens' Party Borgaraflokkurinn
- Leader: Jón Magnússon
- Founded: 1923
- Dissolved: February 1924
- Split from: Independence Party (historical)
- Preceded by: Home Rule Party
- Succeeded by: Conservative Party (majority); Liberal Party (minority)
- Ideology: Conservatism
- Political position: Centre-right

The Citizens' Party (Icelandic: Borgaraflokkurinn) was a political party in Iceland.

== History ==
The party was formed as a loose collective of conservative candidates for the 1923 elections, including former members of the dissolved Home Rule Party, as well as the Independence Party. It won the elections, taking 16 of the 28 seats in the Lower House and 7 of the 14 seats in the Upper House. In February 1924 twenty of the party's MPs founded the Conservative Party, and the party was dissolved in the same year. The three remaining MPs sat under the banner of the Independence Party, before forming the Liberal Party in 1927.

A second Citizens' Party was established in 1987.
