= Union Party (Iceland) =

Union Party Sambandsflokkurinn
- Leader: Hannes Hafstein
- Founded: 1912
- Dissolved: 1914
- Member parties: Home Rule Party; Independence Party moderate wing Independents
- Ideology: Pro-Act of Union; Home rule Icelandic autonomism

The Union Party (Icelandic: Sambandsflokkurinn) was a political party in Iceland. It was founded after the 1911 elections as an alliance between the Home Rule Party under Hannes Hafstein, the moderate part of the Independence Party and some Independents. When the Althing convened in July 1912 the party was formally registered as a parliamentary group comprising 32 of the 40 members and Hannes Hafstein was appointed Minister for Iceland. The purpose of the party was to solve the issue of a union treaty between Iceland and Denmark, which had proven extremely difficult to solve after the Althing refused a draft proposal from the Danish-Icelandic constitutional commission in 1908.

A compromise proposal presented by Hannes in spring 1913 was heavily criticized in the Icelandic press, and the Union Party split into three factions, a group that continued to support Hannes, a restored Home Rule Party under the leadership of Lárus H. Bjarnason and a Farmers' Party. Hannes succeeded in getting most of the party's MPs members reunited, apart from four MPs that continued as the Farmers' Party, and a constitutional proposal was finally approved in the fall of 1913. Upon reunification the party was formally registered as the Home Rule Party, but was still commonly known as the Union Party. The supporters of Hannes lost the 1914 election and he subsequently resigned. The constitutional proposal was approved for a second time by the Althing in 1914 and formed the basis for the union treaty of 1918.
