= October 1916 Icelandic parliamentary election =

- 21 October 1916
- All 26 seats in the Lower House; 8 of 14 seats in the Upper House
- Turnout: 49.18% (▲24.90pp)
Party	Leader	Vote %	Seats
Upper House^{[a]}
Home Rule	Jón Magnússon	39.95	7
Farmers'	Ólafur Briem	8.79	1
Independence	Disputed	7.60	2
Independence – Þversum	Einar Arnórsson	7.03	3
Ind. Farmers	Sigurður Jónsson	4.15	1
Lower House
Home Rule	Jón Magnússon	39.95	8
Independence – Langsum	Sigurður Eggerz	15.71	3
Farmers'	Ólafur Briem	8.79	4
Independence	Disputed	7.60	1
Independence – Þversum	Einar Arnórsson	7.03	6
Social Democratic	Jón Baldvinsson	6.77	1
Ind. Farmers	Sigurður Jónsson	4.15	1
Independents	—	10.01	2
This lists parties that won seats. See the complete results below.
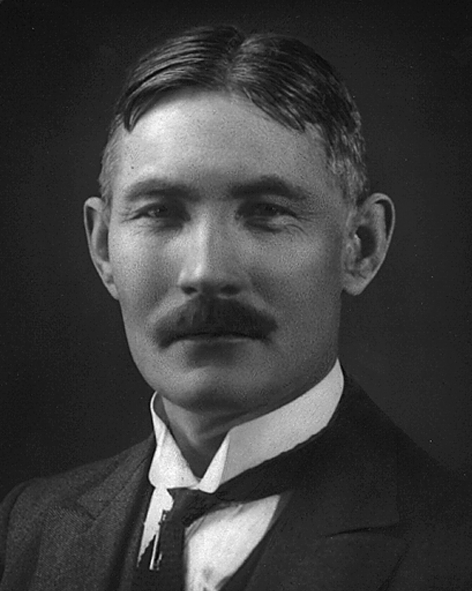

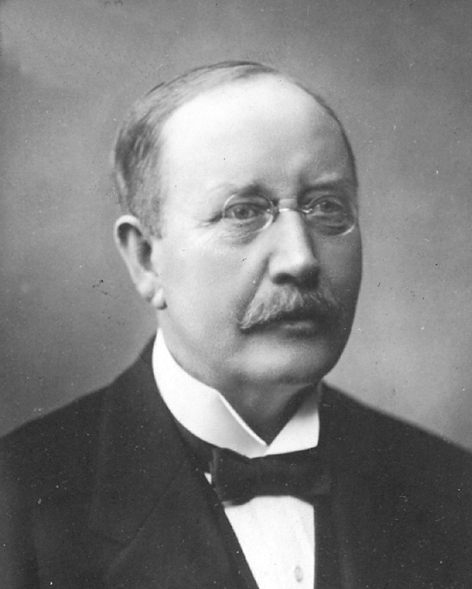
Minister for Iceland before	Prime Minister after August and October elections
Einar Arnórsson; Independence - Þversum	Jón Magnússon; Home Rule

Parliamentary elections were held in Iceland on 21 October 1916. Voters elected all 26 seats in the Lower House of the Althing and eight of the fourteen seats in Upper House, the other six having been elected in August. The Home Rule Party emerged as the largest party in the Lower House of the Althing, winning eight of the 26 seats.

== Results ==
Party	Votes	%	Seats	
Party	Votes	%	Lower House	Upper House (Note: Includes the seats elected in August)
Home Rule Party	5,333.5	39.95	8	7
Independence Party – Langsum	2,097	15.71	3	0
Farmers' Party	1,173	8.79	4	1
Independence Party	1,014	7.60	1	2
Independence Party – Þversum	938.5	7.03	6	3
Social Democratic Party	903.5	6.77	1	0
Independent Farmers	554	4.15	1	1
Independents	1,336.5	10.01	2	0
Total	13,350	100.00	26	14
Valid votes	13,350	95.15		
Invalid/blank votes	680	4.85		
Total votes	14,030	100.00		
Registered voters/turnout	28,529	49.18		
Source: Nohlen & Stöver
