= Farmers' Party (Iceland, 1913) =

Farmers' Party Bændaflokkur
- Leader: Ólafur Briem
- Founded: 1913
- Dissolved: 16 December 1916
- Split from: Union Party
- Merged into: Progressive Party
- Headquarters: Reykjavík
- Ideology: Agrarianism

The Farmers' Party (Icelandic: Bændaflokkur) was a political party in Iceland between 1913 and 1916.

== History ==
The party was established in 1913 by MPs from the Union Party, which was formed in 1912 as a joint group of the Home Rule Party and the moderate majority in the Independence Party. The party suffered a split in 1916 when some members left to form the Independent Farmers, but there were no MPs among them.

In the August 1916 elections to the six previously appointed seats in the upper house of the Althing, the party finished fourth with 7.5%. However, by the October elections to both houses, it finished third in the popular vote, winning four seats in the lower house and one in the upper house. Following the elections it merged with the Independent Farmers to form the Progressive Party.

== The second Farmers' Party ==
A new Farmers' Party was formed in 1933 following a breakaway from the Progressive Party by members who disagreed with the leadership's decision to target a broader electorate rather than remain a class party for the farmers.
