= Pétur Havsteen =

Icelandic public servant and politician

Pétur Havsteen (17 February 1812 – 24 June 1875) was an Icelandic public servant and politician.

== Family ==
Pétur was born in Hofsós. His parents were Jakob Havsteen (1774 – 1829), a shopkeeper in Hofsós, and his wife Maren Jóhannsdóttir Havsteen (née Birch). Pétur was married 3 times. In 1847, he married Guðrún Hannesdóttir Havstein, the daughter of Hannes Stephensen, a member of the Althing, and Þórunn Magnúsdóttir Stephensen. They had 2 children. After the death of Guðrún in 1851 Pétur married Sigríður Ólafsdóttir Havstein (née Stephensen), the daughter of Ólafur Magnússon Stephensen. Eventually, they divorced, and she remarried Stefán Thordersen, a member of the Althing. In 1857, Pétur married Katrín Kristjana Gunnarsdóttir Havstein, the daughter of Gunnar Gunnarsson, a priest in Laufási; Katrín was also the sister of Eggert Gunnarsson and Tryggvi Gunnarsson, both members of the Althing. They had 9 children.

One of Pétur's children was Hannes Hafstein, a member of the Althing and a cabinet minister. Three of Pétur's daughters married Althing members, who were named Jón Þórarinsson, Jónas Jónassen, and Lárus H. Bjarnason.

== Education and public service ==
Pétur obtained a stúdentspróf from Bessastaðaskóli in 1835. He then sailed to Copenhagen and graduated as a lawyer from Hafnarháskóli in 1840. In 1845, he was appointed as a representative from Norður- Múlasýsla and served as district commissioner for Suður- Múlasýsla from 1845 – 1846. In 1850, he appointed the amtmann in Norður- og austuramt and lived there in Möðruvellir (Hörgárdal). In 1870, Pétur retired from politics.

Pétur was the royal representative for one Althing session, in 1853.
