= National Defence Party (Iceland) =

National Defence Party Landvarnarflokkurinn
- Founders: Einar Benediktsson; Jón Jensson; Bjarni Jónsson frá Vogi
- Founded: 1902
- Dissolved: 1912
- Merged into: Independence Party (historical)
- Ideology: Denmark-Iceland personal union Icelandic independence

The National Defence Party (Icelandic: Landvarnarflokkurinn) was an Icelandic political movement which operated from 1902 to 1912, founded because of discontentedness with a clause in the Icelandic constitution that stated that the Icelandic minister should bring up cases in the Danish Council of State. The clause was in the constitution from 1903 to 1915, at which point the Danish king ordered that it should be removed.

The founders of Landvarnarflokkurinn, who included Einar Benediktsson, Bjarni Jónsson and Jón Jensson, were the most radical fighters for Iceland's independence of that time.
