= Einar Benediktsson =

Icelandic poet (1864–1940)

Einar Benediktsson, often referred to as Einar Ben (31 October 1864 – 12 January 1940) was an Icelandic poet and lawyer.

Einar Benediktsson's poetry was a significant contribution to the nationalistic revival which led to Iceland's independence. To this end, he was active both in founding the Landvarnarflokkurinn in 1902, and as the editor of Iceland's first daily newspaper, Dagskrá, from 1896 to 1898. As a poet, he may be classified as a Neo-Romantic. He advocated for Greenland to become part of an independent Iceland.

He pioneered as a strong advocate of inward foreign investment to utilize Iceland's natural resources. In 1906 he joined the management of two companies, Skjálfanda and Gigant, formed to build and operate hydroelectric power plants, particularly the northern waterfalls of the Skjálfandafljót and Jökulsá á Fjöllum rivers. Fund raising began, but there was opposition from people who objected to foreign involvement. In 1914 Einar Benediktsson was one of the founders of Fossafélagið Títan and three sister companies Sirius, Orion and Taurus, established to harness the power of the Þjórsá waterfalls.

Although he lived rather extravagantly for his time, and travelled widely, he later fell on hard times and eventually moved to the remote area of Herdísarvík with his second wife.

He was much admired for his poetry, which has been described as ornate and demonstrating his patriotism and love for nature. His translations include English, and American poetry, as well as a masterful rendering of Henrik Ibsen's epic, Peer Gynt, into Icelandic. Einar Benediktsson was buried at Iceland's national shrine, Þingvellir. He has descendants living today in Iceland, other European countries, and the United States, most notably including former ambassador and namesake Einar Benediktsson (b. 1931).

He resided at Höfði house in northern Reykjavík for twelve years between 1913 and 1925. Einar's statue, made in 1964 by Ásmundur Sveinsson, was moved in 2015 from Miklatún park, in Reykjavik, and now stands near the house.

Einar Benediktsson's verse has been set by many composers, including Jón Leifs, Jórunn Viðar, and Hjálmar H. Ragnarsson. Among the largest such works are Leifs' Dettifoss for choir and orchestra, Viðar's Mansöngur fyrir Ólafs rímu Grænlendings, and Ragnarsson's Three Songs from Peer Gynt.

== Works ==
- 1897: Sögur og kvæði (Stories and poems)
- 1901: Pétur Gautur, translation from Henrik Ibsen's Peer Gynt.
- 1906: Hafblik, poems
- 1913: Hrannir, poems
- 1921: Vogar, poems
- 1930: Hvammar, poems
