= Independent Farmers =

Independent Farmers Óháðir bændur
- Leader: Sigurður Jónsson
- Founded: 1916
- Dissolved: 16 December 1916
- Split from: Farmers' Party
- Merged into: Progressive Party
- Ideology: Agrarianism; Icelandic nationalism

The Independent Farmers (Icelandic: Óháðir bændur) were a short-lived political party in Iceland in 1916.

== History ==
The party was established in 1916 as a breakaway from the Farmers' Party. In the August 1916 elections to the six previously appointed seats in the upper house of the Althing, the party finished third with 22% of the vote. However, by the October elections to both houses, its vote share had fallen to just 4%, with the party winning just one seat in each of the houses. Following the elections, it merged with the Farmers' Party to form the Progressive Party.
