= Viðskiptablaðið =

Icelandic newspaper

- Type: Weekly newspaper
- Owner: Myllusetur ehf.
- Editor: Trausti Hafliðason
- Founded: 1994
- Headquarters: Reykjavík, Iceland
- Website: www.vb.is

Viðskiptablaðið (English: The Business Paper) is an Icelandic newspaper focusing on business, economy, and national affairs.

== History ==
The paper was founded in 1994 as a weekly paper on business and economy affairs. Its first editor was Óli Björn Kárason. In January 2004, it started publishing twice a week and in February 2007 four times a week. In November 2008 it was changed again to a weekly newspaper. The same month, the paper was bought by Myllusetur ehf. that also publishes Fiskifréttir and the Frjáls Verslun.

== See also ==
- List of newspapers in Iceland
