= Independence Party (Iceland) =

Independence Party Sjálfstæðisflokkurinn
- Chairperson: Guðrún Hafsteinsdóttir
- Vice-chairperson: Jens Garðar Helgason
- Secretary: Vilhjálmur Árnason
- Parliamentary group chairperson: Ólafur Adolfsson
- Chief Executive: Tryggvi Másson
- Founder: Jón Þorláksson; Sigurður Eggerz
- Founded: 25 May 1929
- Merger of: Conservative Party; Liberal Party
- Headquarters: Kringlunni 5, 103 Reykjavík
- Youth wing: Young Independents
- Ideology: Conservatism (Icelandic); Economic liberalism
- Political position: Centre-right
- European affiliation: EPP (associate); ECR Party (2011–2021)
- International affiliation: International Democracy Union
- Nordic affiliation: Conservative Group
- Colours: Blue
- Seats in Parliament: 14 / 63

Website
- xd.is

The Independence Party (Icelandic: Sjálfstæðisflokkurinn [ˈsjaul(f)ˌstaiːðɪsˌflɔhkʏrɪn]) is a conservative political party in Iceland. It is currently the second largest party in the Alþingi, with 14 seats. The chairman of the party is Guðrún Hafsteinsdóttir and the vice chairman of the party is Jens Garðar Helgason.

It was formed in 1929 through a merger of the Conservative Party and the Liberal Party. This united the two parties advocating the dissolution of the Union of Denmark and Iceland; dissolution was achieved in 1944, during the German occupation of Denmark. Since its formation in 1929, the party has won the largest share of the vote in every election except 2009 and 2024, when it fell behind the Social Democratic Alliance. Until Guðrún Hafsteinsdóttir was elected chair in 2025, every leader of the Independence Party had at some point served as Prime Minister. The party has been out of government during three periods since 1983: from 1988 to 1991, from 2009 to 2013, and since December 2024.

On fiscal issues, the Independence Party is economically liberal, favouring privatisation, and opposed to interventionism. Positioned ideologically on the centre-right of the political spectrum, the party is most strongly supported by fishermen and high-income earners. The party is a longstanding member of the International Democracy Union, and in September 2023 obtained associate member status in the European People's Party.

== History ==
Established on 25 May 1929, the Independence Party was founded through a merger of the Conservative Party (1924) and the Liberal Party (1925). It readopted the name of the historical Independence Party, which had split between the Conservatives and Liberals in 1927. The fusion of the Icelandic conservative and liberal parties resulted in the ascension of the Independence Party to prominence, firmly establishing it as the primary non-socialist force in Scandinavian politics. From its first election, in 1931, it was the largest party in Iceland.

The Independence Party and its predecessor, the Conservative Party, have been associated with several early milestones for women in Icelandic politics. Ingibjörg H. Bjarnason, the first woman elected to the Althing, was elected on a Women's List in 1922 before joining the Conservative Party in 1924 and later the Independence Party. Guðrún Lárusdóttir, an Independence Party MP, became the first woman to be elected in a general parliamentary election in 1934. In 1970, Independence Party MP Auður Auðuns became the first woman to serve as a government minister in Iceland when she was appointed Minister of Justice and Ecclesiastical Affairs. Other Independence Party women who reached parliamentary milestones included Ragnhildur Helgadóttir, the first woman elected to preside over a chamber of the Althing in 1961, and Salome Þorkelsdóttir, who became the first Speaker of the unicameral Althing in 1991.

The Independence Party won the 2007 election, receiving 36.6% of the vote and 25 seats in the Althing. It subsequently formed a coalition government under Geir Haarde with the Social Democratic Alliance, after the Progressive Party suffered significant losses. In the 2009 election, the Independence Party fell from 25 to 16 seats and became Iceland's second-largest party behind the Social Democratic Alliance.

The Independence Party returned to government following the 2013 election, winning 19 seats and again receiving the largest share of the vote. It formed a majority coalition with the Progressive Party, headed by Progressive Party chairman Sigmundur Davíð Gunnlaugsson as prime minister, while Bjarni Benediktsson became Minister of Finance and Economic Affairs.

Following the publication of the Panama Papers in April 2016, Sigmundur Davíð stepped aside as prime minister amid controversy over his family's offshore holdings. He was succeeded by Sigurður Ingi Jóhannsson on 7 April. The coalition between the Progressive Party and the Independence Party remained in office under Sigurður Ingi, with five ministers from each party, until a new government was formed following the 2016 election.

Following the publication of the Panama Papers in April 2016, Sigmundur Davíð stepped aside as prime minister amid controversy over his family's offshore holdings. He was succeeded by Sigurður Ingi Jóhannsson on 7 April. The coalition between the Progressive Party and the Independence Party remained in office under Sigurður Ingi until the 2016 parliamentary election.

In the election, held on 29 October 2016, the Independence Party increased its representation from 19 to 21 seats and received 29.0% of the vote, remaining the largest party in the Althing. Following coalition negotiations, the Independence Party formed a government with Viðreisn and Bright Future, which took office on 11 January 2017 with Bjarni Benediktsson as prime minister.

The coalition collapsed in September 2017 after Bright Future withdrew from the government, citing a "serious breach of trust". The withdrawal followed revelations that Benedikt Sveinsson, the prime minister's father, had written a letter of recommendation supporting an application for the restoration of civil rights by Hjalti Sigurjón Hauksson, who had been convicted of sexual offences against his stepdaughter. Justice Minister Sigríður Á. Andersen had informed Benediktsson of his father's involvement in July, before the information became public. Following the loss of the government's parliamentary majority, Benediktsson called an early election, which was held on 28 October 2017.

In the 2017 election, the Independence Party remained the largest party but fell from 21 to 16 seats. It subsequently entered a coalition with the Left-Green Movement and the Progressive Party, headed by Left-Green leader Katrín Jakobsdóttir as prime minister.

After the 2021 parliamentary election, the new government was, just like the previous government, a tri-party coalition of the Independence Party, the Progressive Party and the Left-Green Movement, headed by Prime Minister Katrín Jakobsdóttir of Left-Green Movement. In April 2024, following Katrín Jakobsdóttir's resignation to run in the presidential election, Bjarni Benediktsson replaced her as prime minister. The existing coalition between the Independence Party, the Progressive Party and the Left-Green Movement continued under Benediktsson. On 13 October 2024, Benediktsson announced that he was ending the governing coalition, citing growing disagreements between the parties, including over asylum and energy policy, and said that he would request the dissolution of parliament and an election on 30 November. The decision was made by Benediktsson and came as a surprise to the leaders of both coalition partners. President Halla Tómasdóttir subsequently accepted the government's resignation and agreed to dissolve parliament. The Left-Green ministers subsequently left the caretaker government, while ministers from the Independence and Progressive parties remained in office until a new government was formed. The parliamentary election was held on 30 November 2024. The Independence Party received its worst result ever, returning just 14 representatives to the Althing on just 19% of the vote, both the lowest totals in party history. Due to the fractured opposition, however, the Independence Party still finished second in terms of total votes and total seats.

== Ideology and platform ==
The Independence Party has been described as conservative and conservative-liberal.

The party has been the sole major politically right-leaning party in Iceland since its inception, and has captured a broad cross-section of centre-right voters. As a result, the party is not as far to the right as most right-wing parties in other Nordic countries, serving as a 'catch-all' party. The party, like the British Conservatives, states a claim to be primarily 'pragmatic', as opposed to ideological, and its name is seen as an allusion to being independent of dogma (with the original meaning, promoting independence from Denmark, having been achieved long ago). For most of its period of political dominance, the party has relied upon coalition government, and has made coalitions with many major parties in parliament.

The Independence Party has generally been economically liberal and advocated limited government intervention in the economy. It was originally committed to laissez-faire economics, but shifted its economic policies leftwards in the 1930s, accepting the creation of a welfare state.

The party is liberal concerning social issues and has historically been less conservative than other centre-right parties in Scandinavia. The party was the only consistent advocate for the end of prohibition of beer, and provided three-quarters of voters in favour of legalisation; the ban was lifted in 1989.

== Organisation and support ==
Historically, the party has been the most successful liberal conservative party in the Nordic countries. It has a broad base of support, but is most strongly supported by Iceland's large fishing community and by businesses. The Independence Party support is mostly found in the South and Southwest.

The Independence Party has always attempted to avoid appealing to a specific social class. As such, the party is relatively successful at attracting working-class voters, which partly comes from the party's strong advocacy of independence in the 1930s. However, most of its strength is in the middle class, and the party is disproportionately supported by those on high incomes and those with university educations.

The party has long been endorsed by Morgunblaðið, an Icelandic newspaper of record. Davíð Oddsson, Iceland's longest-serving Prime Minister and former leader of the Independence Party, was one of two editors of the paper until his passing in 2026. The party was also historically supported by the afternoon newspaper Vísir, now part of DV.

The party has a tradition of individualism and strong personalities, which has proven difficult for the leadership to manage. The Commonwealth Party split in 1941, while the Republican Party left in 1953, both in opposition to the leftwards shift of the party away from classical liberalism. Neither splinter group managed to get seats in Althingi and both vanished quickly. The Citizens' Party split from the party in 1983, but collapsed in 1994.

Its youth wing, Young Independents, is by far the largest youth organisation in Iceland, with over 12,000 members. It is slightly more classically liberal than the senior party.

The party has a very large membership base, with 15% of the total population being a member of the party.

== International relations ==
Former party logo

For years, the Independence party has been a member of the International Democracy Union; the Union includes comparable parties such as the Conservative Party (Norway), Moderate Party (Sweden), The Republicans (France), the National Coalition Party (Finland), and the Christian Democratic Union (Germany). In 2011, the party joined the European Conservatives and Reformists Party, a centre-right Eurosceptic political organisation, but withdrew in 2021. In September 2023, it joined the pro-EU European People's Party as an associate member.

== Election results ==
| Election | Leader | Votes | % | Seats | +/– | Position | Government |
|---|---|---|---|---|---|---|---|
| 1931 | Jón Þorláksson | 16,891 | 43.82 | 15 / 42 | New | 2nd | Opposition |
| 1933 | Jón Þorláksson | 17,131 | 48.01 | 20 / 42 | ▲5 | ▲1st | Coalition |
| 1934 | Jón Þorláksson | 21,974 | 42.32 | 20 / 49 | ▲0 | 1st | Opposition |
| 1937 | Ólafur Thors | 24,132 | 41.31 | 17 / 49 | ▼3 | ▼2nd | Opposition |
| 1942 (Jul) | Ólafur Thors | 22,975 | 39.52 | 17 / 49 | 0 | 2nd | Minority |
| 1942 (Oct) | Ólafur Thors | 23,001 | 38.55 | 20 / 52 | ▲3 | ▲1st | Opposition |
| 1946 | Ólafur Thors | 26,428 | 39.50 | 20 / 52 | 0 | 1st | Coalition |
| 1949 | Ólafur Thors | 28,546 | 39.53 | 19 / 52 | ▼1 | 1st | Minority |
| 1953 | Ólafur Thors | 28,738 | 37.12 | 21 / 52 | ▲2 | 1st | Coalition |
| 1956 | Ólafur Thors | 35,027 | 42.37 | 19 / 52 | ▼2 | 1st | Opposition |
| 1959 (Jun) | Ólafur Thors | 36,029 | 42.49 | 20 / 52 | ▲1 | 1st | Opposition |
| 1959 (Oct) | Ólafur Thors | 33,800 | 39.72 | 24 / 60 | ▲4 | 1st | Coalition |
| 1963 | Bjarni Benediktsson | 37,021 | 41.43 | 24 / 60 | 0 | 1st | Coalition |
| 1967 | Bjarni Benediktsson | 36,036 | 37.50 | 23 / 60 | ▼1 | 1st | Coalition |
| 1971 | Jóhann Hafstein | 38,170 | 36.22 | 22 / 60 | ▼1 | 1st | Opposition |
| 1974 | Geir Hallgrímsson | 48,764 | 42.73 | 25 / 60 | ▲3 | 1st | Coalition |
| 1978 | Geir Hallgrímsson | 39,982 | 32.72 | 20 / 60 | ▼5 | 1st | Opposition |
| 1979 | Geir Hallgrímsson | 43,838 | 35.42 | 21 / 60 | ▲1 | 1st | Opposition |
| 1983 | Geir Hallgrímsson | 50,251 | 38.67 | 23 / 60 | ▲2 | 1st | Coalition |
| 1987 | Þorsteinn Pálsson | 41,490 | 27.17 | 18 / 63 | ▼5 | 1st | Coalition |
| 1991 | Davíð Oddsson | 60,836 | 38.56 | 26 / 63 | ▲8 | 1st | Coalition |
| 1995 | Davíð Oddsson | 61,183 | 37.07 | 25 / 63 | ▼1 | 1st | Coalition |
| 1999 | Davíð Oddsson | 67,513 | 40.74 | 26 / 63 | ▲1 | 1st | Coalition |
| 2003 | Davíð Oddsson | 61,701 | 33.68 | 22 / 63 | ▼4 | 1st | Coalition |
| 2007 | Geir Haarde | 66,754 | 36.64 | 25 / 63 | ▲3 | 1st | Coalition |
| 2009 | Bjarni Benediktsson | 44,371 | 23.70 | 16 / 63 | ▼9 | ▼2nd | Opposition |
| 2013 | Bjarni Benediktsson | 50,454 | 26.70 | 19 / 63 | ▲3 | ▲1st | Coalition |
| 2016 | Bjarni Benediktsson | 54,990 | 29.00 | 21 / 63 | ▲2 | 1st | Coalition |
| 2017 | Bjarni Benediktsson | 49,543 | 25.25 | 16 / 63 | ▼5 | 1st | Coalition |
| 2021 | Bjarni Benediktsson | 48,708 | 24.39 | 16 / 63 | 0 | 1st | Coalition |
| 2024 | Bjarni Benediktsson | 41,143 | 19.36 | 14 / 63 | ▼2 | ▼2nd | Opposition |

== Leadership ==
| Nº | Chairman | Took office | Left office | Duration |
|---|---|---|---|---|
| 1 | Jón Þorláksson (1877–1935) | 29 May 1929 | 2 October 1934 | 5 years, 4 months, 3 days (1,952 days) |
| 2 | Ólafur Thors (1892–1964) | 2 October 1934 | 22 October 1961 | 27 years, 20 days (9,882 days) |
| 3 | Bjarni Benediktsson (1908–1970) | 22 October 1961 | 10 July 1970 | 8 years, 8 months, 18 days (3,183 days) |
| 4 | Jóhann Hafstein (1915–1980) | 10 July 1970 | 12 October 1973 | 3 years, 3 months, 2 days (1,190 days) |
| 5 | Geir Hallgrímsson (1925–1990) | 12 October 1973 | 6 November 1983 | 10 years, 25 days (3,677 days) |
| 6 | Þorsteinn Pálsson (born 1947) | 6 November 1983 | 10 March 1991 | 7 years, 4 months, 4 days (2,681 days) |
| 7 | Davíð Oddsson (born 1948) | 10 March 1991 | 16 October 2005 | 14 years, 7 months, 6 days (5,334 days) |
| 8 | Geir Haarde (born 1951) | 16 October 2005 | 29 March 2009 | 3 years, 5 months, 13 days (1,260 days) |
| 9 | Bjarni Benediktsson (born 1970) | 29 March 2009 | 2 March 2025 | 15 years, 338 days (5817 days) |
| 10 | Guðrún Hafsteinsdóttir (born 1970) | 2 March 2025 | Present | 1 year, 235 days |
