= Helgi Sigurðsson (cartoonist) =

Icelandic cartoonist

- Other names: Helgi Sig
- Occupations: Cartoonist, designer

Helgi Sigurðsson is an Icelandic cartoonist and designer, best known for his decade long work as a cartoonist for Morgunblaðið.

== Career ==
Helgi started drawing cartoons for Morgunblaðið in May 2010. He became known for controversial drawings on topics such as immigration, refugees and COVID-19. His last drawing was published on 14 December 2021. On 7 January 2022, it was reported that Helgi had resigned from Morgunblaðið following editorial requests that he would tone his latest submissions.
