= August 1916 Icelandic parliamentary election =

- 5 August 1916
- 6 of the 14 seats in the Upper House of the Althing
- Turnout: 24.28%
Party	Leader	Vote %	Seats
Home Rule	Jón Magnússon	33.45	3
Independence – Þversum	Einar Arnórsson	22.94	2
Ind. Farmers	Sigurður Jónsson	22.13	1
This lists parties that won seats. See the complete results below.
Minister for Iceland before	Prime Minister after August and October elections
Einar Arnórsson; Independence - Þversum	Jón Magnússon; Home Rule

Parliamentary elections were held in Iceland on 5 August 1916, the first elections held after women's suffrage was introduced. Following reforms to the Althing the previous year, the six seats in the Upper House appointed by the monarch were abolished, and replaced with six elected seats. The seats were elected by proportional representation at the national level, using the D'Hondt method. The remaining eight seats were elected along with the Lower House in October.

== Results ==
Party	Votes	%	Seats
Home Rule Party	1,950	33.45	3
Independence Party – Þversum	1,337	22.94	2
Independent Farmers	1,290	22.13	1
Farmers' Party	435	7.46	0
Independence Party – Langsum	419	7.19	0
Social Democratic Party	398	6.83	0
Total	5,829	100.00	6
Valid votes	5,829	99.25	
Invalid/blank votes	44	0.75	
Total votes	5,873	100.00	
Registered voters/turnout	24,189	24.28	
Source: Mackie & Rose, Nohlen & Stöver
