= Sigmúnd Jóhannsson =

Icelandic cartoonist and inventor

- Born: Sigmúnd Johanson Baldvinsen; April 22, 1931; Ibestad, Gratangen, Norway
- Died: May 19, 2012 (aged 81)
- Other names: Sigmund
- Occupations: Cartoonist, inventor and engineer
- Years active: c.1960 – 2010
- Known for: Cartoonist at Morgunblaðið
- Spouse: Helga Ólafsdóttir
- Children: 3
- Website: sigmund.is

Sigmúnd Johanson Baldvinsen (22 April 1931 – 19 May 2012) was an Icelandic cartoonist, inventor and engineer. He was best known for his caricatures at Morgunblaðið and his invention of an automatic release equipment for lifeboats. He was awarded the Knight's Cross of the Icelandic Order of the Falcon in 1982.

== Early life ==
Sigmund was born in Ibestad in Gratangen in Norway and came to Iceland when he was three years old. His father was Icelandic and his mother was Norwegian. Sigmund grew up in Akureyri but then moved to the Westman Islands. He was married to Helgi Ólafsdóttir but she is from the Westman Islands.

== Cartoonist ==
Sigmund's first drawing for Morgunblaðið was published on 25 February 1964 and featured the first landings on Surtsey. He became a permanent cartoonist for Morgunblaðið in 1975 and worked there until October 2008.

In 2004, the Icelandic state bought 10,000 drawings by Sigmund and made them available to the public on the website sigmund.is, which was opened in 2009.
