= Dagblaðið =

Icelandic newspaper

- "Free, independent newspaper"
- Type: Daily newspaper
- Editor: Jónas Kristjánsson (1975-1981)
- Founded: 1975
- Ceased publication: 1981
- Language: Icelandic
- Country: Iceland
- ISSN: 1670-0880

Dagblaðið (Icelandic pronunciation: [ˈtaɣˌplaːðɪð], transl. The Daily Paper) was an Icelandic newspaper founded in 1975 by former employees of Vísir with Jónas Kristjánsson as its first editor. It marked a breakthrough in Icelandic newspaper publication as it was the first major newspaper that was independent of political parties. Its first edition was published on 8 September the same year.

On 26 November 1981, Dagblaðið and Vísir merged to form Dagblaðið Vísir.
