= Hannes Hafstein =

Icelandic politician (1861–1922)

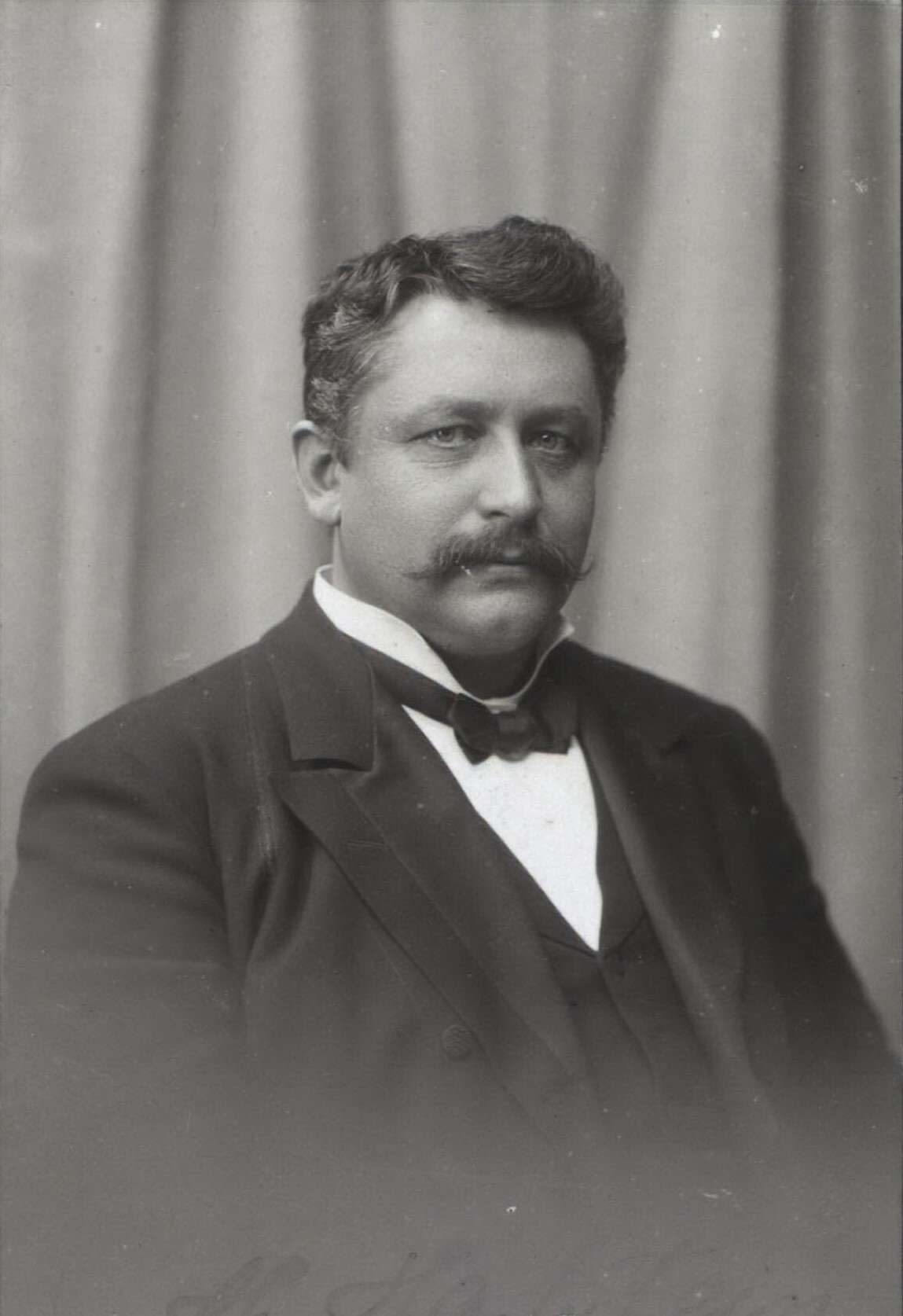

1st Prime Minister of Iceland (as 6th Minister for Iceland)
- In office 1 February 1904 – 31 March 1909
- Preceded by: Position established
- Succeeded by: Björn Jónsson
- Monarchs: Christian IX of Denmark; Frederick VIII of Denmark
- In office 25 July 1912 – 21 July 1914
- Monarch: Christian X of Denmark
- Preceded by: Kristján Jónsson
- Succeeded by: Sigurður Eggerz

Speaker of the Althing
- In office 1912 – 25 July 1912
- Preceded by: Skúli Thoroddsen
- Succeeded by: Jón Magnússon

Member of the Althing
- In office 1900–1901
- Constituency: Ísafjarðarsýsla
- In office 1903–1915
- Constituency: Eyjafjörður
- In office 1916–1922
- Constituency: National

Personal details
- Born: 4 December 1861 Hörgárdalur, Iceland
- Died: 13 December 1922 (aged 61) Reykjavík, Iceland
- Party: Home Rule Party
- Other political affiliations: Union Party (electoral alliance between 1912—1914)
- Children: 10
- Parents: Pétur Havsteen (father); Kristjana Gunnarsdóttir Havstein (mother)

Hannes Þórður Pétursson Hafstein (4 December 1861 – 13 December 1922) was an Icelandic politician and poet. In 1904 he became the first Icelander to be appointed to the Danish Cabinet as the Minister for Iceland in the Cabinet of Deuntzer and was – unlike the previous minister for Iceland Peter Adler Alberti – responsible to the Icelandic Althing. He is considered to be the 1st Prime Minister of Iceland, he was also the 1st Minister for Iceland under Home Rule.

== Biography ==
Hannes was born on the farm Möðruvellir in Hörgárdalur valley. His parents were Pétur Havstein (17 February 1812 – 24 June 1875) Governor of North and East Iceland and Kristjana Gunnarsdóttir Havstein (20 September 1836 – 24 February 1927) sister of Iceland's first bank chairman, Tryggvi Gunnarsson.

He obtained the national grammar school leaving certificate (stúdentspróf) in 1880 and obtained a law degree (lower second class) from the University of Copenhagen in 1886. He was member of Alþingi in 1900–1901, 1903–1915 and 1916–1922, and attended his last meeting there in 1917.

He was proposed the first Minister for Iceland on 31 January 1904 from 1 February 1904, and he served as such until 31 March 1909. Then he became the managing director of the Bank of Iceland. In 1912 he was elected speaker of Althingi, prior to becoming Minister for Iceland for the second time from 24 July 1912 to 21 July 1914, when he became managing director again. In 1917 his declining health forced him to resign his duties.

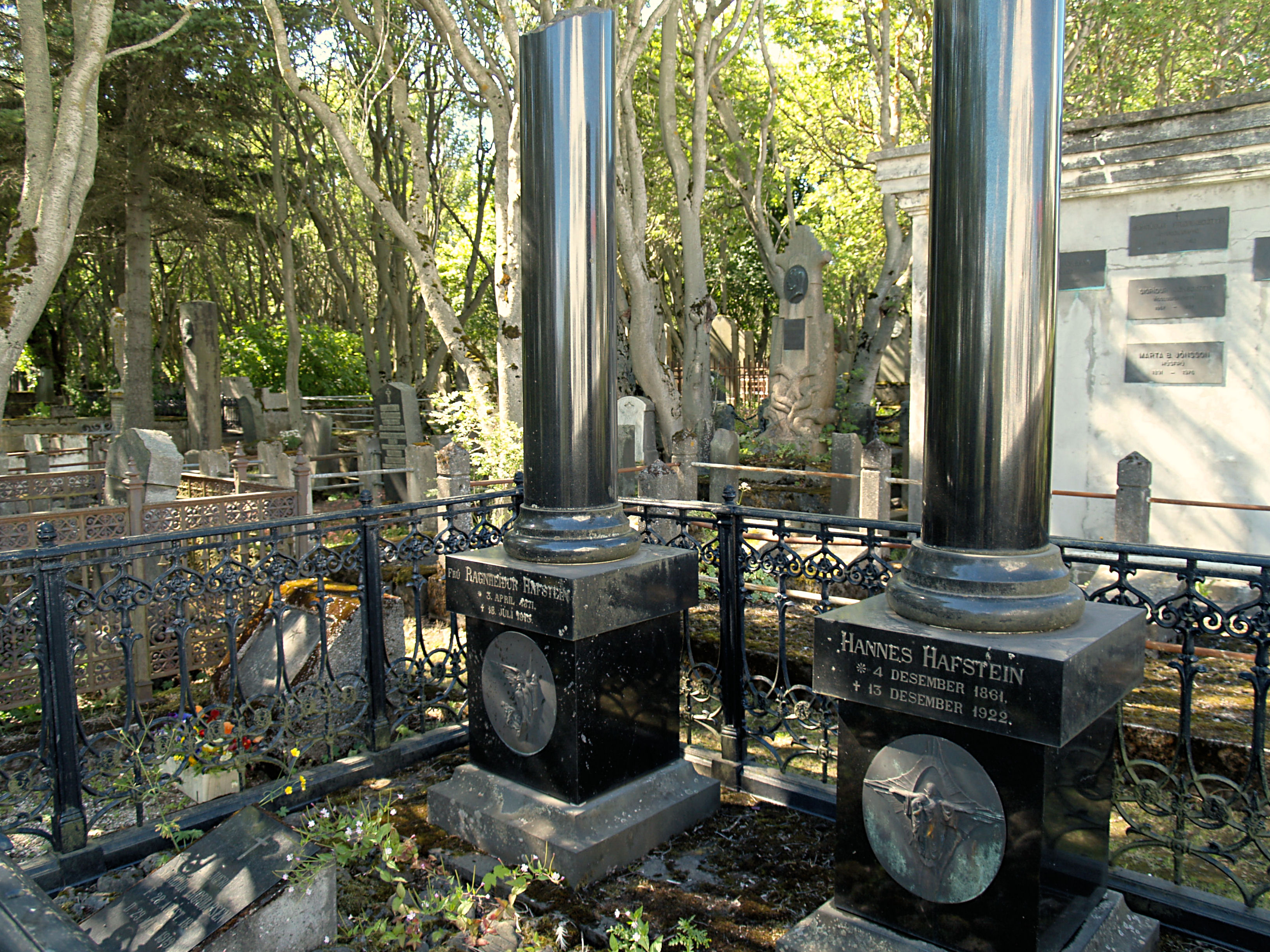
Gravesite at Hólavallagarður cemetery in Reykjavík

Hannes Hafstein died in Reykjavík on 13 December 1922. In 1931 a statue of Hannes by sculptor Einar Jónsson was unveiled in Reykjavik. The roundels on his and his wife's graves were also by Einar Jónsson.

As a poet, Hannes Hafstein wrote primarily in the national romantic tradition, often incorporating humorous or satirical elements. His poems were widely read and became well known among the Icelandic public.
