= Vísir =

Icelandic newspaper

- Type: Daily newspaper
- Founder: Einar Gunnarsson
- Founded: 1910
- Ceased publication: 1981
- Language: Icelandic
- City: Reykjavík
- Country: Iceland
- ISSN: 1670-0872

Vísir was an Icelandic newspaper founded in December 1910 by Einar Gunnarsson, originally only distributed in and around Reykjavík. In 1967, Jónas Kristjánsson became its editor. In 1975, he left the paper after a conflict with the ownership group of on his editorial policy and founded Dagblaðið.

On 26 November 1981, Vísir and Dagblaðið merged to form Dagblaðið Vísir.
