= DV (newspaper) =

Online newspaper in Iceland

Dagblaðið Vísir
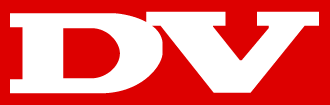
- Type: Online newspaper
- Format: Tabloid (formerly)
- Owner(s): Torg ehf.
- Editor: Björn Þorfinnsson
- Founded: 1981; 44 years ago
- Headquarters: Hlidasmari 2, 201 Kópavogur; 201 Reykjavík
- Country: Iceland
- ISSN: 1021-8254
- Website: www.dv.is

DV (Dagblaðið Vísir) is an online newspaper in Iceland published by Torg ehf. It came into existence as a daily newspaper in 1981 when two formerly independent newspapers, Vísir and Dagblaðið, merged.

Early on it was one of the largest newspapers in Iceland and at one point had a 64% readership in Iceland. In the 1990s its readership started to dwindle and in 2003 its publisher was declared bankrupt. It was resurrected a week later by the publisher of Fréttablaðið. In 2006 it was changed from a daily newspaper into a weekly one. Since then it has changed publishers regularly and in 2018 its publisher, DV ehf., went bankrupt. Its assets were bought by a new publisher, Frjáls fjölmiðlun ehf.

In December 2019, Torg ehf., the owner of Fréttablaðið, agreed to buy Dagblaðið Vísir from Frjáls Fjölmiðlun ehf.

The media has changed dramatically since its inception. Today it is online only and focuses mainly on sensational crime stories, astrology, and domestic and foreign celebrity news. Its editorial policy has sparked public controversies in Iceland.

== History ==
DV was founded in 1981 from a merger of two preceding newspapers, Dagblaðið and Vísir, that were founded in 1975 and 1910 respectively.

=== 2001 Árni Johnsen scandal ===
On 13 July 2001, DV revealed that Árni Johnsen, a prominent member of Alþingi, had taken out building materials from the construction store Byko on 2 July 2001 in the name of the building committee of the National Theatre of Iceland but had the materials transported to his home in Vestmannaeyjar. The scandal led to his resignation from Alþingi on 19 July 2001. In February 2003, he was sentenced by the Supreme Court of Iceland to 2 years in prison for embezzlement and misrepresentation in public office, bribery and false reports to the authorities.

=== 2006 suicide controversy ===
In January 2006, DV ran a cover story claiming that former elementary school teacher Gísli Hjartarson had sexually abused two or more boys in his home town of Ísafjörður, Northwest Iceland. Gísli, who had not been charged with the abuse, committed suicide the same day and cited the coming news coverage as his reason in a letter he left for his family, although he did not name DV specifically. The accusers of the man stated their displeasure with DV's article as it ruined the progress of the case as well as the continued harassment from their reporters. The event caused an uproar against DV with 32,044 people signing an online petition demanding a new editorial policy. On 13 January 2006, the editors, Mikael Torfason and Jónas Kristjánsson, resigned from their posts. On 4 June 2008, DV reported that The State Committee of Compensations had paid compensation to two of the boys.

=== 2008–2011 Icelandic financial crisis ===
Following the 2008–2011 Icelandic financial crisis, the report of the Special Investigation Commission, that was formed by Alþingi, specifically noted DV as almost the only newspaper in Iceland that questioned the Icelandic banks prior to the collapse of the Icelandic banking system in 2008. As a result, the paper acquired broader readership.

== See also ==
- List of newspapers in Iceland
