= Independence Party (Iceland, historical) =

Independence Party Sjálfstæðisflokkurinn
- Founders: Björn Jónsson; Skúli Thoroddsen; Bjarni Jónsson frá Vogi; Benedikt Sveinsson
- Founded: 29 June 1907 (alliance); 14 February 1909 (party)
- Dissolved: 1927
- Merger of: Democratic Party; National Defence Party
- Succeeded by: Citizens' Party (historical); Liberal Party
- Ideology: Liberalism; Icelandic separatism
- Political position: Centre to centre-right

Party flag

The Independence Party (Icelandic: Sjálfstæðisflokkurinn) was a political party in Iceland between 1907 and 1927. Along with the Home Rule Party, it was one of the dominant parties in the country during the early 20th century.

== History ==
The party was established in 1907 by a merger of the Democratic Party and the National Defence Party. During the two elections in 1916, it was split into two factions; Þversum and Langsum. The Þversum faction finished second in the August Upper House elections, with the Langsum faction in fifth, whilst the positions were reversed in the October general elections. The party ran as a single entity in the 1919 elections, emerging as the second largest party after the Home Rule Party. It remained in the government with the Home Rule Party and Progressive Party until 1920, when the Home Rule Party began to govern alone.

In the 1922 Upper House elections, the Independence Party finished fifth, with just 5% of the vote, but returned to join the Home Rule Party in a coalition government. For the general elections the following year it allied with former members of the dissolved Home Rule Party to establish the Citizens' Party. The new party won the elections with 23 of the 42 seats, with the Independence Party winning a further two seats in the Upper House.

The following year saw the Citizens' Party dissolved, with most MPs forming the Conservative Party. The remaining MPs reassumed the Independence Party name, and they founded the Liberal Party in 1927. In 1929, the Liberal Party merged with the Conservative Party to establish the modern Independence Party.
