= Morgunblaðið =

Icelandic newspaper

- Front page for 18 October 2018
- Type: Daily newspaper
- Format: Tabloid
- Owner: Árvakur hf
- Founders: Vilhjálmur Finsen; Ólafur Björnsson
- Editor: Davíð Oddsson and Haraldur Johannessen
- Deputy editor: Karl Blöndal
- Staff writers: 150 news staff (2023)
- Founded: February 11, 1913; 113 years ago
- Political alignment: Centre-right
- Headquarters: Hádegismóar 2, Reykjavík, Iceland
- Circulation: 50,000
- Sister newspapers: Iceland Monitor
- ISSN: 1021-7266
- Website: www.mbl.is

Morgunblaðið (Icelandic pronunciation: [ˈmɔrkʏnˌplaːðɪθ], The Morning Paper) is an Icelandic daily newspaper. Morgunblaðið's website, mbl.is, is the most popular website in Iceland. It is currently the country's only daily printed newspaper and the newspaper of record.

== History ==
Morgunblaðið was founded by Vilhjálmur Finsen and Ólafur Björnsson, brother of Iceland's first president, Sveinn Björnsson. The first issue, only eight pages long, was published on 2 November 1913.

On 25 February 1964, the paper first printed a caricature by Sigmúnd Jóhannsson which featured the first landings on Surtsey. He became a permanent cartoonist for Morgunblaðið in 1975 and worked there until October 2008.

In a controversial decision, the owners of the paper decided in September 2009 to appoint Davíð Oddsson, a member of the Independence Party, Iceland's longest-serving prime minister and former governor of the Central Bank, as one of the two editors of the paper.

In May 2010, Helgi Sigurðsson was hired as the papers cartoonist. He became known for controversial drawings on topics such as immigration, refugees and COVID-19. His last drawing was published on 14 December 2021. On 7 January 2022, it was reported that Helgi had resigned from Morgunblaðið, following editorial requests that he tone down his latest submissions.

== See also ==
- List of newspapers in Iceland
- List of non-English newspapers with English language subsections
