= Einar Arnórsson =

Icelandic politician (1880–1955)

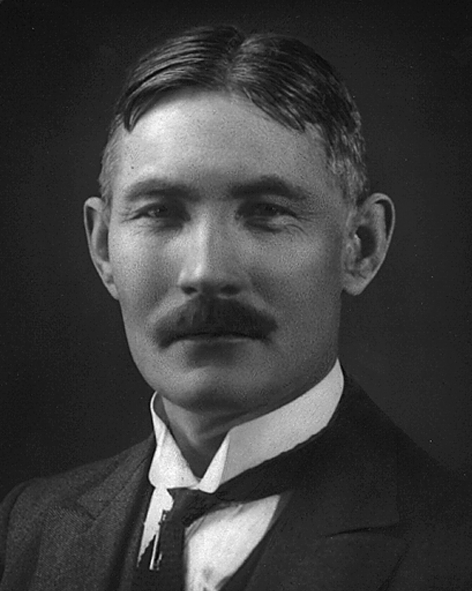

5th Minister for Iceland
- In office 4 May 1915 – 4 January 1917
- Preceded by: Sigurður Eggerz
- Succeeded by: Jón Magnússon (as 6th Prime Minister)

Personal details
- Born: 24 February 1880; Minna-Mosfell, Grímsnes, Iceland
- Died: 29 March 1955 (aged 75); Reykjavík, Iceland
- Political party: Independence Party (historical) (þversum faction); Independence Party (modern)

Einar Arnórsson (24 February 1880 – 29 March 1955) was an Icelandic politician, lawyer and law professor. He was the minister for Iceland from 4 May 1915 to 4 January 1917.

== Biography ==
Einar was born in Minna-Mosfell in Grímsnes to Arnór Jónsson and Guðrún Þorgilsdóttir. He graduated in law from the University of Copenhagen in 1906. He was elected to Althingi and sat there in 1914–1919 and 1931–1932 for the Independence party. He was Minister of Education and Justice in Björn Þórðarson's cabinet from 1942 to 1944. He was professor of law at the University of Iceland from 1911 to 1915 and again after leaving office as Minister for Iceland from 1917 to 1922. He was a Supreme Court Judge in 1932–1942 and again in 1944–1945. He was Rector of the University of Iceland in 1918–1919 and 1929–1930. For a short time he was father-in-law to Halldór Laxness. He was editor of Ísafold and Morgunblaðið in 1919–1920.

== Death ==
Einar died around noon on 29 March 1955, shortly before he was scheduled to argue a case before the Supreme Court of Iceland.
