= Conservative Party (Iceland) =

Conservative Party Íhaldsflokkurinn
- Leader: Jón Þorláksson
- Founded: 24 February 1924
- Dissolved: 25 May 1929
- Preceded by: Citizens' Party
- Merged into: Independence Party
- Ideology: Conservatism; Icelandic separatism
- Political position: Centre-right

The Conservative Party (Icelandic: Íhaldsflokkurinn) was a conservative political party in Iceland between 1924 and 1929.

== History ==
The party was established in 1924 by a majority of the members of the Citizens' Party. It won the 1926 Upper House elections and the 1927 parliamentary elections, in which it received 42.% of the vote.

In 1929 it merged with the Liberal Party to form the Independence Party.

== Ideology ==
The party supported the full independence of Iceland and separation from the Danish crown.
