= Jón Magnússon (politician) =

Icelandic politician (1859–1926)

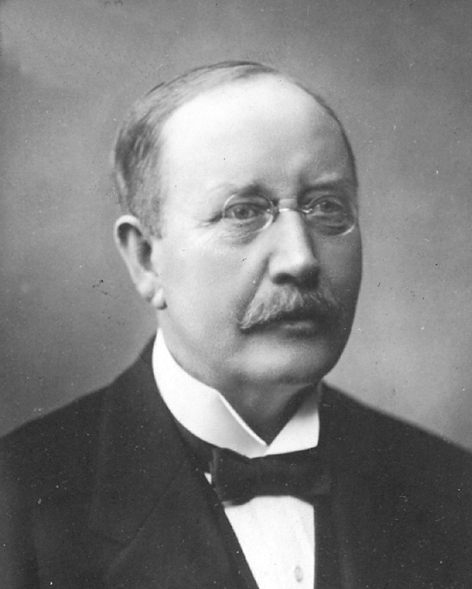

6th Prime Minister of Iceland
- In office 22 March 1924 – 23 June 1926
- Monarch: Christian X
- Preceded by: Sigurður Eggerz
- Succeeded by: Magnús Guðmundsson
- In office 4 January 1917 – 7 March 1922
- Monarch: Christian X
- Preceded by: Einar Arnórsson (as 5th Minister for Iceland)
- Succeeded by: Sigurður Eggerz

Personal details
- Born: 16 January 1859; Aðaldalur, Iceland
- Died: 23 June 1926 (aged 67); Norðfjörður, Kingdom of Iceland
- Political party: Conservative Party
- Spouse: Þóra Jónsdóttir

Jón Magnússon (16 January 1859 – 23 June 1926) was an Icelandic politician, and was prime minister of Iceland on two occasions. He served his first term, as a member of the Home Rule Party (Heimastjórnarflokkurinn), from 4 January 1917 to 7 March 1922. He served his second term, as a member of the Conservative Party (Íhaldsflokkurinn, a forerunner of the Independence Party), from 22 March 1924 to 23 June 1926. He served as speaker of the Althing from 1913 to 1914.

== Death ==
In June 1926, Jón traveled with King Christian X to Seyðisfjörður aboard the HDMS Niels Juel. Following the king's departure back to Denmark on 22 June, Jón traveled with HDMS Gejser to Norðfjörður, where he grew up. On the evening of 23 June, he suddenly collapsed and died while visiting the Jón Guðmundsson, the local priest.

Political offices
Preceded by Einar Arnórsson	Prime Minister of Iceland (first term); 1917–1922	Succeeded by Sigurður Eggerz
Preceded by Sigurður Eggerz	Prime Minister of Iceland (second term); 1924–1926	Succeeded by Magnús Guðmundsson (acting)
