= Sigurður Eggerz =

Icelandic politician (1875–1945)

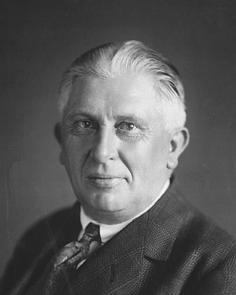

4th Minister for Iceland
- In office 7 March 1922 – 22 March 1924
- Monarch: Christian X
- Preceded by: Jón Magnússon
- Succeeded by: Jón Magnússon
- In office 21 July 1914 – 4 May 1915
- Monarch: Christian X
- Preceded by: Hannes Hafstein
- Succeeded by: Einar Arnórsson

Personal details
- Born: 1 March 1875 Borðeyri, Iceland
- Died: 16 November 1945 (aged 70) Reykjavík, Iceland
- Party: Independence Party
- Spouse: Solveig Kristjánsdóttir
- Children: 2

Sigurður Eggerz (1 March 1875 – 16 November 1945) was minister for Iceland from 21 July 1914 to 4 May 1915, and prime minister of Iceland from 7 March 1922 to 22 March 1924.

== Career ==
He was a member of Alþingi from 1911 to 1915, 1916 to 1926 and 1927 to 1931. He was minister of Finance of Iceland from 1917 to 1920. He served as speaker of the Althing in 1922. He was one of the politicians that founded the Independence Party in 1929. He graduated in laws from University of Copenhagen in 1903.

== Family ==
His wife was named Solveig Kristjánsdóttir, and they had two children: Erna and Kristján Pétur. Kristján Pétur Eggerz entered the Ministry of Foreign Affairs, where he served in various diplomatic posts, including as Ambassador to Germany, before retiring to Iceland and becoming a bestselling author. His granddaughter, is author Sólveig Eggerz.

Political offices
Preceded by Hannes Hafstein	Minister for Iceland; 1914–1915	Succeeded by Einar Arnórsson
Preceded by Jón Magnússon	Prime Minister of Iceland; 1922–1924	Succeeded by Jón Magnússon
