= Home Rule Party (Iceland) =

Home Rule Party Heimastjórnarflokkurinn
- Leader: Hannes Hafstein
- Founded: 29 June 1900 (alliance); 14 February 1909 (party)
- Dissolved: 1923
- Succeeded by: Citizens' Party
- Headquarters: Reykjavík
- Ideology: Home rule Icelandic autonomism Conservatism
- Political position: Centre-right

The Home Rule Party (Icelandic: Heimastjórnarflokkurinn) was a political party in Iceland between 1900 and 1923. Alongside the Independence Party, it was one of two dominant parties in the country in the early 20th century. Its leader was Hannes Hafstein.

== History ==
The party was established in 1900 to oppose the original Progressive Party. It won every election between 1916 and 1922. Between 1918 and 1920 it governed in coalition with the Independence Party and the new Progressive Party, before forming a government alone in 1920. In 1922 the Independence Party rejoined the government.

In 1923 the party was dissolved and its members formed the Citizens' Party alongside the Independence Party. The following year, the Conservative Party was established by a majority of Citizens' Party members, with the remainder reassuming the Independence Party name.

== Ideology ==
The party's main policy was to have the Danish Minister for Iceland based in Reykjavík rather than Copenhagen.

== Election results ==
Election	Votes	%	Seats	Place
August 1916	1,950	33.5	—N/a	1st
October 1916	5,333.5 ▲	40.0 ▲	15	1st
1919	6,423 ▲	45.8 ▲	16 ▲	1st
1922	3,258 ▼	27.6 ▼	—N/a	1st
