= List of cabinets of Iceland =

This is a list of cabinets of Iceland.

== List ==
=== Kingdom of Iceland (1918–1944) ===
Nº	Cabinet (Nickname)	Took office	Left office	Duration	Coalition parties	Number of		King
Nº	Cabinet (Nickname)	Took office	Left office	Duration	Coalition parties	ministers	ministries	King
1	Jón Magnússon I	4 January 1917	25 February 1920	3 years, 1 month, 21 days (1,147 days)	HRP—IP þversum—PP	N/A	0	Christian X
2	Jón Magnússon II	25 February 1920	7 March 1922	2 years, 10 days (741 days)	HRP—independents	N/A	0	Christian X
3	Sigurður Eggerz	7 March 1922	22 March 1924	2 years, 15 days (746 days)	IP—PP—independents	N/A	0	Christian X
4	Jón Magnússon III	22 March 1924	8 July 1926	2 years, 3 months, 16 days (838 days)	CP	N/A	0	Christian X
5	Jón Þorláksson	8 July 1926	28 August 1927	1 year, 1 month, 20 days (416 days)	CP	N/A	0	Christian X
6	Tryggvi Þórhallsson	28 August 1927	3 June 1932	4 years, 9 months, 6 days (1,741 days)	PP	N/A	0	Christian X
7	Ásgeir Ásgeirsson	3 June 1932	28 July 1934	2 years, 1 month, 25 days (785 days)	PP—IP	N/A	0	Christian X
8	Hermann Jónasson I	28 July 1934	2 April 1938	3 years, 8 months, 5 days (1,344 days)	PP—SDP	N/A	0	Christian X
9	Hermann Jónasson II	2 April 1938	17 April 1939	1 year, 15 days (380 days)	PP	N/A	0	Christian X
10	Hermann Jónasson III	17 April 1939	18 November 1941	2 years, 7 months, 1 day (946 days)	national unity government PP—IP—SDP	N/A	0	Christian X
11	Hermann Jónasson IV	18 November 1941	16 May 1942	5 months, 28 days (179 days)	PP—IP—SDP	N/A	0	Christian X
12	Ólafur Thors I	16 May 1942	16 December 1942	7 months (214 days)	IP	N/A	0	Christian X
13	Björn Þórðarson (The "Coca-Cola" Administration)	16 December 1942	21 October 1944	1 year, 10 months, 5 days (675 days)	Ministers from outside the Althing, appointed by the regent	N/A	0	Christian X

=== Republic of Iceland (1944–present) ===
Nº	Cabinet (Nickname)	Took office	Left office	Duration	Coalition parties	Number of		President
Nº	Cabinet (Nickname)	Took office	Left office	Duration	Coalition parties	ministers	ministries	President
14	Ólafur Thors II (The Innovation Administration)	21 October 1944	4 February 1947	2 years, 3 months, 14 days (836 days)	IP—SP—SDP	N/A	0	Sveinn Björnsson
15	Stefán Jóhann Stefánsson	4 February 1947	6 December 1949	2 years, 10 months, 2 days (1,036 days)	SDP—IP—PP	N/A	0	Sveinn Björnsson
16	Ólafur Thors III	6 December 1949	14 March 1950	3 months, 8 days (98 days)	IP	N/A	0	Sveinn Björnsson
17	Steingrímur Steinþórsson	14 March 1950	11 September 1953	3 years, 5 months, 28 days (1,277 days)	PP—IP	N/A	0	Sveinn Björnsson; Ásgeir Ásgeirsson
18	Ólafur Thors IV	11 September 1953	24 July 1956	3 years, 13 days (1,109 days)	IP—PP	N/A	0	Ásgeir Ásgeirsson
19	Hermann Jónasson V	24 July 1956	23 December 1958	2 years, 4 months, 29 days (882 days)	PP—PA—SDP	N/A	0	Ásgeir Ásgeirsson; Kristján Eldjárn
20	Emil Jónsson	23 December 1958	20 November 1959	10 months, 28 days (332 days)	SDP	N/A	0	Kristján Eldjárn
21	Ólafur Thors V (The Reconstruction Administration)	20 November 1959	14 November 1963	3 years, 11 months, 25 days (1,455 days)	IP—SDP	N/A	0	Kristján Eldjárn
22	Bjarni Benediktsson the Elder	14 November 1963	10 July 1970	6 years, 7 months, 26 days (2,430 days)	IP—SDP	N/A	13	Kristján Eldjárn
23	Jóhann Hafstein	10 July 1970	14 July 1971	1 year, 4 days (369 days)	IP—SDP	6–7	13	Kristján Eldjárn
24	Ólafur Jóhannesson I	14 July 1971	28 August 1974	3 years, 1 month, 14 days (1,141 days)	PP—PA—ULL	6–7	13	Kristján Eldjárn
25	Geir Hallgrímsson	28 August 1974	1 September 1978	4 years, 4 days (1,465 days)	IP—PP	8	13	Kristján Eldjárn
26	Ólafur Jóhannesson II	1 September 1978	15 October 1979	1 year, 1 month, 14 days (409 days)	PP—PA—SDP	9	13	Kristján Eldjárn
27	Benedikt Sigurðsson Gröndal	15 October 1979	8 February 1980	3 months, 24 days (116 days)	SDP	6	13	Kristján Eldjárn
28	Gunnar Thoroddsen	8 February 1980	26 May 1983	3 years, 3 months, 18 days (1,203 days)	IP—PP—PA	10	13	Kristján Eldjárn; Vigdís Finnbogadóttir
29	Steingrímur Hermannsson I	26 May 1983	8 July 1987	4 years, 1 month, 12 days (1,504 days)	PP—IP	9–10	13	Vigdís Finnbogadóttir
30	Þorsteinn Pálsson	8 July 1987	28 September 1988	1 year, 2 months, 20 days (448 days)	IP—PP—SDP	11	13	Vigdís Finnbogadóttir
31	Steingrímur Hermannsson II	28 September 1988	10 September 1989	11 months, 13 days (347 days)	PP—SDP—PA	9	13	Vigdís Finnbogadóttir
32	Steingrímur Hermannsson III	10 September 1989	30 April 1991	1 year, 7 months, 20 days (597 days)	PP—SDP—PA—CP	11	13–14	Vigdís Finnbogadóttir
33	Davíð Oddsson I (The Viðey Administration)	30 April 1991	23 April 1995	3 years, 11 months, 24 days (1,454 days)	IP—SDP	9–10	14	Vigdís Finnbogadóttir
34	Davíð Oddsson II	23 April 1995	28 May 1999	4 years, 1 month, 5 days (1,496 days)	IP—PP	8–10	14	Vigdís Finnbogadóttir; Ólafur Ragnar Grímsson
35	Davíð Oddsson III	28 May 1999	23 May 2003	3 years, 11 months, 25 days (1,456 days)	IP—PP	12	14	Ólafur Ragnar Grímsson
36	Davíð Oddsson IV	23 May 2003	15 September 2004	1 year, 3 months, 23 days (481 days)	IP—PP	12	14	Ólafur Ragnar Grímsson
37	Halldór Ásgrímsson	15 September 2004	15 June 2006	1 year, 9 months (638 days)	PP—IP	12	14	Ólafur Ragnar Grímsson
38	Geir Haarde I	15 June 2006	24 May 2007	11 months, 9 days (343 days)	IP—PP	12	14	Ólafur Ragnar Grímsson
39	Geir Haarde II	24 May 2007	1 February 2009	1 year, 8 months, 8 days (619 days)	IP—SDA	12	12–14	Ólafur Ragnar Grímsson
40	Jóhanna Sigurðardóttir I	1 February 2009	10 May 2009	3 months, 9 days (98 days)	SDA—LGM—independents	10	12	Ólafur Ragnar Grímsson
41	Jóhanna Sigurðardóttir II	10 May 2009	23 May 2013	4 years, 13 days (1474 days)	SDA—LGM—independents	8–12	8–12	Ólafur Ragnar Grímsson
42	Sigmundur Davíð Gunnlaugsson	23 May 2013	7 April 2016	2 years, 10 months, 15 days (1,050 days)	PP—IP	9–10	10	Ólafur Ragnar Grímsson
43	Sigurður Ingi Jóhannsson	7 April 2016	11 January 2017	9 months and 4 days (279 days)	PP—IP	10	10	Ólafur Ragnar Grímsson
44	Bjarni Benediktsson the Younger I	11 January 2017	15 September 2017	8 months, 1 day (245 days)	IP—C—BF	10	10	Guðni Th. Jóhannesson
45	Katrín Jakobsdóttir I	30 November 2017	28 November 2021	3 years, 11 months and 29 days (1,459 days)	LGM—IP—PP	11	9	Guðni Th. Jóhannesson
46	Katrín Jakobsdóttir II	28 November 2021	9 April 2024	2 years, 4 months and 10 days (861 days)	LGM—IP—PP	13	13	Guðni Th. Jóhannesson
47	Bjarni Benediktsson the Younger II	9 April 2024	21 December 2024	16 months, 12 days (509 days)	IP—PP—LGM	12	12	Guðni Th. Jóhannesson Halla Tómasdóttir
48	Kristrún Frostadóttir	21 December 2024	incumbent	incumbent	S—C—F	11	11	Halla Tómasdóttir

== Members of the Iceland governments since Cabinet Davíð Oddsson III ==
*) The person has been temporarily entrusted with the management of the ministry.
1. In Iceland, surnames are not based on a family name system. First names and, in many cases, initials of the surname are used.

== See also ==
- Government of Iceland
