= Cabinet of Tryggvi Þórhallsson =

Government of Iceland from 1927 to 1932

- 6th Cabinet of Iceland
- 1927–1932
- Date formed: 28 August 1927
- Date dissolved: 3 June 1932

People and organisations
- Head of state: Christian X of Denmark
- Head of government: Tryggvi Þórhallsson
- Member party: Progressive Party

History
- Elections: 1927 election; 1930 election
- Outgoing election: 1931 election
- Predecessor: Cabinet of Jón Þorláksson
- Successor: Cabinet of Ásgeir Ásgeirsson

The Cabinet of Tryggvi Þórhallsson, nicknamed “The Government of Jónas from Hrifla”, (Icelandic: Stjórn Jónasar frá Hriflu), was formed 28 August 1927.

== Cabinets ==
=== Inaugural cabinet ===
| Officeholder | Office |
|---|---|
| Tryggvi Þórhallsson | Prime Minister |
| Tryggvi Þórhallsson | Minister of Employment and Transport |
| Jónas Jónsson | Minister of Justice |
| Magnús Kristjánsson | Minister of Finance |

=== Change (8 December 1928) ===
| Officeholder | Office |
|---|---|
| Tryggvi Þórhallsson | Prime Minister |
| Tryggvi Þórhallsson | Minister of Employment and Transport |
| Tryggvi Þórhallsson | Minister of Finance |
| Jónas Jónsson | Minister of Justice |

=== Change (7 March 1929) ===
| Officeholder | Office |
|---|---|
| Tryggvi Þórhallsson | Prime Minister |
| Tryggvi Þórhallsson | Minister of Employment and Transport |
| Einar Árnason | Minister of Finance |
| Jónas Jónsson | Minister of Justice |

=== Change (20 April 1931) ===
| Officeholder | Office |
|---|---|
| Tryggvi Þórhallsson | Prime Minister |
| Tryggvi Þórhallsson | Minister of Finance |
| Tryggvi Þórhallsson | Minister of Justice and Ecclesiastical Affairs |
| Sigurður Kristinsson | Minister of Employment and Transport |

=== Change (20 August 1931) ===
| Officeholder | Office |
|---|---|
| Tryggvi Þórhallsson | Prime Minister |
| Tryggvi Þórhallsson | Minister of Employment and Transport |
| Ásgeir Ásgeirsson | Minister of Finance |
| Jónas Jónsson | Minister of Justice |
