= 1931 Icelandic parliamentary election =

- 12 June 1931
- All 28 seats in the Lower House and 8 of 14 seats in the Upper House of Althing
- Turnout: 78.25%
Party	Leader	Vote %	Seats	+/–
Upper House (Note: Includes the three seats elected in 1930)
Independence	Jón Þorláksson	43.82	6	New
Progressive	Tryggvi Þórhallsson	35.92	7	+1
Social Democratic	Jón Baldvinsson	16.08	1	−2
Lower House
Independence	Jón Þorláksson	43.82	9	New
Progressive	Tryggvi Þórhallsson	35.92	16	+3
Social Democratic	Jón Baldvinsson	16.08	3	0
This lists parties that won seats. See the complete results below.
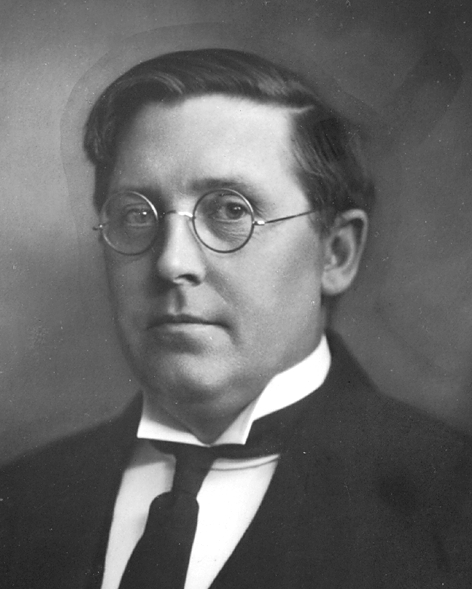

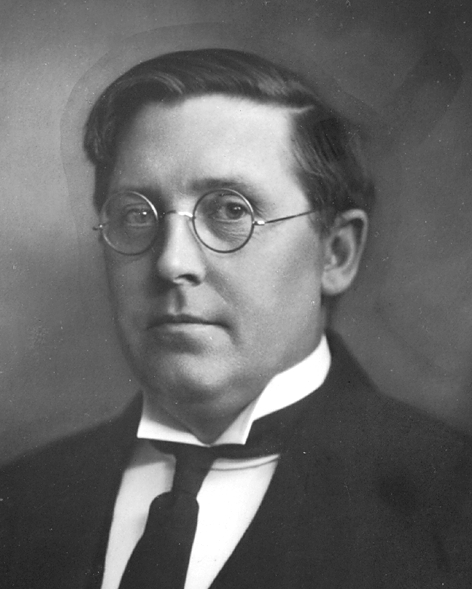
Prime Minister before	Prime Minister after
Tryggvi Þórhallsson; Progressive	Tryggvi Þórhallsson; Progressive

Parliamentary elections were held in Iceland on 12 June 1931. Voters elected all 28 seats in the Lower House of the Althing and eight of the fourteen seats in Upper House. The Progressive Party emerged as the largest party in the Lower House.

== Results ==
Party	Votes	%	Seats			
Party	Votes	%	Lower House	+/–	Upper House	+/–
Independence Party	16,891	43.82	9	–2	6	0
Progressive Party	13,844.5	35.92	16	+3	7	+1
Social Democratic Party	6,197.5	16.08	3	0	1	–2
Communist Party	1,165	3.02	0	New	0	New
Independents	446	1.16	0	–1	0	0
Total	38,544	100.00	28	0	14	0
Valid votes	38,544	97.31				
Invalid/blank votes	1,064	2.69				
Total votes	39,608	100.00				
Registered voters/turnout	50,617	78.25				
Source: Nohlen & Stöver
