= Third cabinet of Jón Magnússon =

Cabinet of Iceland

- 4th Cabinet of Iceland
- 1924–1926
- Date formed: 22 March 1924
- Date dissolved: 8 July 1926

People and organisations
- Head of state: Christian X of Denmark
- Head of government: Jón Magnússon; Magnús Guðmundsson (acting)
- Member party: Conservative Party

History
- Outgoing election: 1926 election
- Predecessor: Cabinet of Sigurður Eggerz
- Successor: Cabinet of Jón Þorláksson

The Cabinet of Jón Magnússon, nicknamed “The Government of High Exchange Rates” (Icelandic: Hágengisstjórnin), and “The Work Government” (Icelandic: Starfsstjórnin), was formed 22 March 1924.

== Cabinets ==
=== Inaugural cabinet ===
Officeholder	Office
Jón Magnússon	Prime Minister
Jón Þorláksson	Minister of Finance
Magnús Guðmundsson	Minister of Employment

=== Change (8 July 1926) ===
Officeholder	Office
Magnús Guðmundsson	Prime Minister
Magnús Guðmundsson	Minister of Employment
Jón Þorláksson	Minister of Finance
