= Björg =

Björg or Bjørg is a feminine given name of Old Norse origin: bjǫrg ‘protection. It is in use in Scandinavian countries, including Sweden, Norway and Iceland meaning "help, salvation." It is a popular middle name for girls born in Iceland. It was very common in Norway just before World War II, but it later lost its popularity in the country.

== People with the name ==
=== First name ===
- Bjørg Brynhildardóttir Egholm, Faroese politician
- Björg Hafsteinsdóttir (born 1969), Icelandic basketball player
- Bjørg Lødøen (1931–2009), Norwegian painter
- Björg Carítas Þorláksson (1874–1934), Icelandic scholar and teacher.
- Bjørg Vik (1935–2018), Norwegian writer

=== Middle name ===
- Hildur Björg Kjartansdóttir (born 1994), Icelandic basketball player
- Þóra Björg Helgadóttir (born 1981), Icelandic football player
