= Cabinet of Jón Þorláksson =

Government of Iceland from 1926 to 1927

- 5th Cabinet of Iceland
- 1926–1927
- Date formed: 8 July 1926
- Date dissolved: 28 August 1927

People and organisations
- Head of state: Christian X of Denmark
- Head of government: Jón Þorláksson
- Member party: Conservative Party

History
- Outgoing election: 1927 election
- Predecessor: Third cabinet of Jón Magnússon
- Successor: Cabinet of Tryggvi Þórhallsson

The Cabinet of Jón Þorláksson, nicknamed “The Third Citizen Government” (Icelandic: Borgarastjórn III), was formed 8 July 1926.

== Cabinet ==
=== Inaugural cabinet ===
| Officeholder | Office |
|---|---|
| Jón Þorláksson | Prime Minister |
| Jón Þorláksson | Minister of Finance |
| Magnús Guðmundsson | Minister of Employment and Justice |
