= Cabinet of Iceland =

Collective decision-making body of the Icelandic government

Coordinates: 64°08′50″N 21°56′07″W

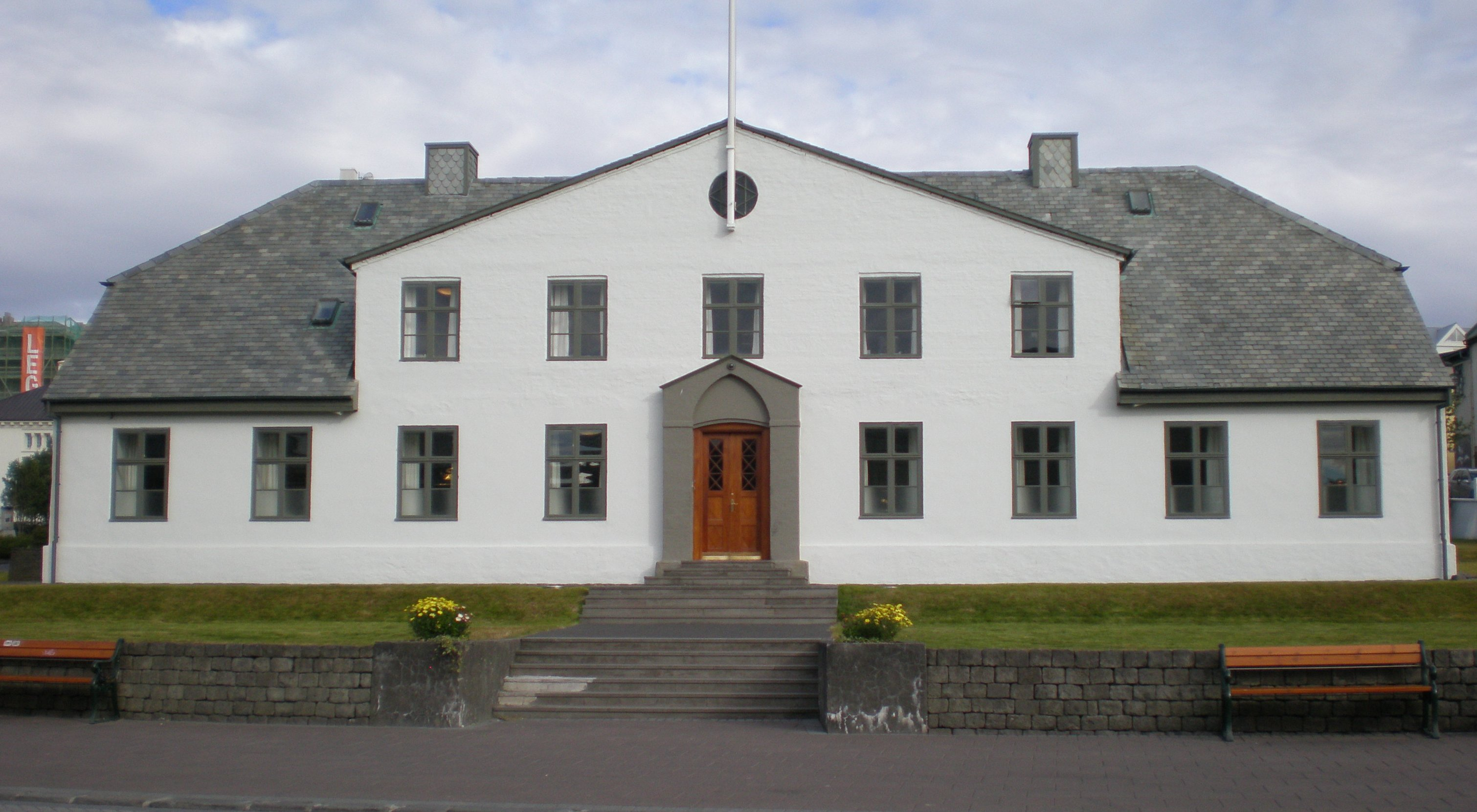
The Cabinet of Iceland and the Prime Minister's Office in Reykjavík.

The Cabinet of Iceland (Icelandic: Stjórnarráð Íslands) is the collective decision-making body of the government of Iceland, composed of the Prime Minister and the cabinet ministers.

== History ==
The Cabinet of Iceland is considered to have been formed 1 February 1904 when home rule was expanded in Iceland and Hannes Hafstein became the first Icelander to hold the position of Minister for Iceland in the Cabinet of Denmark (Cabinet of Deuntzer). A constitutional amendment, confirmed on 3 October 1903, stated that the Minister for Iceland had to be a resident of Reykjavík and be able to read and write Icelandic. The Minister for Iceland therefore belonged to both the Danish Cabinet and the newly created Icelandic Cabinet but was only answerable to the Icelandic Parliament. Executive power was thus transferred to Iceland with the creation of the Icelandic Cabinet (the executive branch of the government). In the beginning, there were no cabinet ministers nor ministries (aside from the Minister for Iceland) that formed the Cabinet but instead the Cabinet was divided into three offices. The offices were called first, second and third office. The first office was responsible for court, school and church affairs, the second for employment, transport and postal affairs and the third for finance. The Minister for Iceland was the most supreme officeholder in the Cabinet, but each office was headed by an Office Manager and a National Secretary supervised the three managers. The position of Minister for Iceland in the Danish and Icelandic cabinet was discontinued 30 November 1918 as the Danish–Icelandic Act of Union was signed 1 December 1918 by Denmark and Iceland. The agreement made Iceland a sovereign state – the Kingdom of Iceland – joined with Denmark in a personal union with the Danish king as the head of state of both kingdoms. The Minister for Iceland at the time of the signing of the agreement, Jón Magnússon, became the first Prime Minister of Iceland.

== Current cabinet ==
As a result of the 2024 Icelandic parliamentary election, the current cabinet is composed of the Social Democratic Alliance, Viðreisn and the People's Party. It was formed on 21 December 2024.

Portfolio	Minister	Took office	Left office	Party
Prime Minister	Kristrún Frostadóttir	21 December 2024	Incumbent	Social Democratic
Minister of Finance and Economic Affairs	Daði Már Kristófersson	21 December 2024	Incumbent	Viðreisn
Minister of Social Affairs and Housing	Inga Sæland	21 December 2024	Incumbent	People's
Minister of Transport and Local Government	Eyjólfur Ármannsson	21 December 2024	Incumbent	People's
Minister for the Environment, Energy and Climate	Jóhann Páll Jóhannsson	21 December 2024	Incumbent	Social Democratic
Minister for Foreign Affairs	Þorgerður Katrín Gunnarsdóttir	21 December 2024	Incumbent	Viðreisn
Minister of Culture, Innovation and Universities	Logi Már Einarsson	21 December 2024	Incumbent	Social Democratic
Minister of Education and Children's Affairs	Ásthildur Lóa Þórsdóttir	21 December 2024	Incumbent	People's
Minister of Health	Alma Möller	21 December 2024	Incumbent	Social Democratic
Minister of Justice	Þorbjörg Sigríður Gunnlaugsdóttir	21 December 2024	Incumbent	Viðreisn
Minister of Industry	Hanna Katrín Friðriksson	21 December 2024	Incumbent	Viðreisn

== See also ==
- List of cabinets of Iceland
