= 1934 Icelandic parliamentary election =

- 24 June 1934
- All 33 seats in the Lower House and 16 seats in the Upper House of Althing
- Turnout: 81.51%
Party	Leader	Vote %	Seats	+/–
Upper House
Independence	Jón Þorláksson	42.32	6	−1
Progressive	Hermann Jónasson	21.91	6	+1
Social Democratic	Jón Baldvinsson	21.70	3	+2
Farmers'	Tryggvi Þórhallsson	6.45	1	New
Lower House
Independence	Jón Þorláksson	42.32	14	+1
Progressive	Hermann Jónasson	21.91	9	−2
Social Democratic	Jón Baldvinsson	21.70	7	+3
Farmers'	Tryggvi Þórhallsson	6.45	2	New
Independents	—	0.96	1	+1
This lists parties that won seats. See the complete results below.
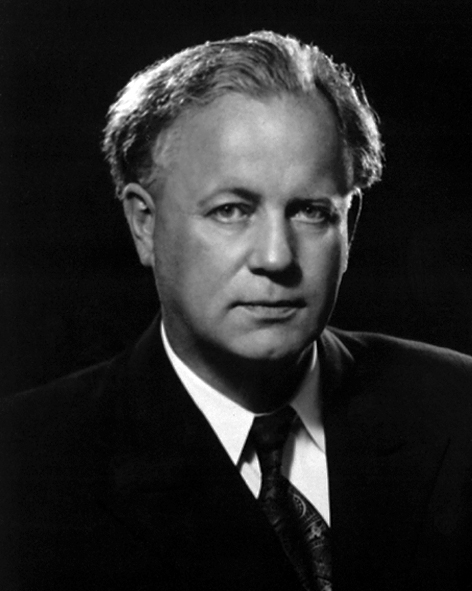

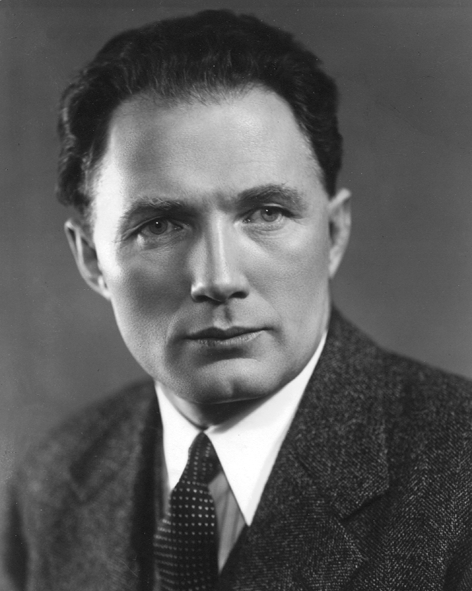
Prime Minister before	Prime Minister after
Ásgeir Ásgeirsson; Progressive	Hermann Jónasson; Progressive

Parliamentary elections were held in Iceland on 24 June 1934. They were the first held after reforms to the electoral system that increased the number of seats in the Lower House from 28 to 33 and ensured that all members of the Althing were elected at the same election. The Independence Party emerged as the largest party in the Lower House, winning 14 of the 33 seats.

== Electoral reform ==
In the previous election, the 28 members of the Lower House Althing had been elected in one- or two-member constituencies by plurality voting, except in Reykjavík, where the four seats were elected by proportional representation. Eight members of the Upper House were elected at the same time as the Lower House, whilst the remaining six members were elected in separate national elections using proportional representation.

The reforms raised the number of seats in the Lower House to 33, of which 11 were to be compensatory seats. The compensatory seats were awarded to parties which had won at least one of the 22 standard seats, and were allocated according to their votes received divided by the seats they had won. Once allocated to a party, the seats were then allocated based on a preferential basis:

1. The party's candidate who had won the highest number of votes in a constituency, but was not elected.
2. The party's candidate who had won the highest percentage of the votes in a constituency, but was not elected.
3. The top candidate on a party's nationwide list (if they had used one).
4. The party's candidate with the second highest number of votes in a constituency, but was not elected.

Although a party could only have one compensatory seat in each constituency, this still left some constituencies over-represented.

All seats in the Upper House seats were now elected at the same time as the Lower House, whilst the number was increased from 14 to 16. In Reykjavík the number of seats was increased from four to six, with a subsequent lowering of the threshold to win a seat in the city. The voting age was lowered to 21, and those receiving poor relief were able to vote for the first time.

== Results ==
Party	Votes	%	Seats			
Party	Votes	%	Lower House	+/–	Upper House	+/–
Independence Party	21,974	42.32	14	+1	6	–1
Progressive Party	11,377.5	21.91	9	–2	6	+1
Social Democratic Party	11,269.5	21.70	7	+3	3	+2
Farmers' Party	3,348	6.45	2	New	1	New
Communist Party	3,098	5.97	0	0	0	0
Nationalist Party	363	0.70	0	New	0	New
Independents	499	0.96	1	+1	0	–1
Total	51,929	100.00	33	+5	16	+2
Valid votes	51,929	99.02				
Invalid/blank votes	516	0.98				
Total votes	52,445	100.00				
Registered voters/turnout	64,338	81.51				
Source: Nohlen & Stöver
