= 1927 Icelandic parliamentary election =

- 9 July 1927
- All 28 seats in the Lower House and 8 of 14 seats in the Upper House of Althing
- Turnout: 71.51%
Party	Leader	Vote %	Seats	+/–
Upper House (Note: Includes the three seats elected in 1926)
Conservative	Jón Þorláksson	42.54	6	New
Progressive	Tryggvi Þórhallsson	29.78	6	+1
Social Democratic	Jón Baldvinsson	19.05	2	+2
Lower House
Conservative	Jón Þorláksson	42.54	10	New
Progressive	Tryggvi Þórhallsson	29.78	13	+3
Social Democratic	Jón Baldvinsson	19.05	3	+2
Liberal	Sigurður Eggerz	5.80	1	New
Independents	—	2.83	1	+1
This lists parties that won seats. See the complete results below.
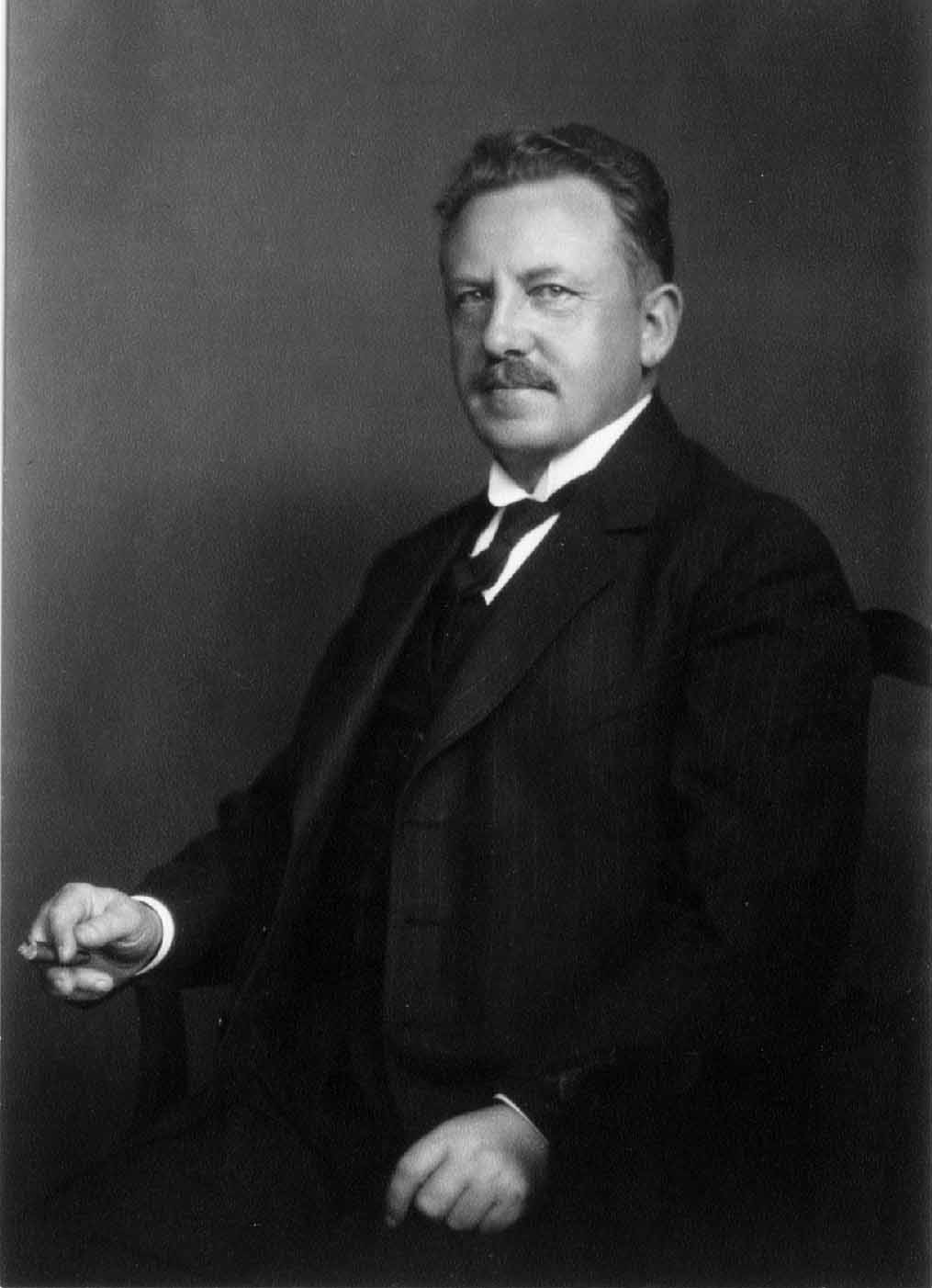

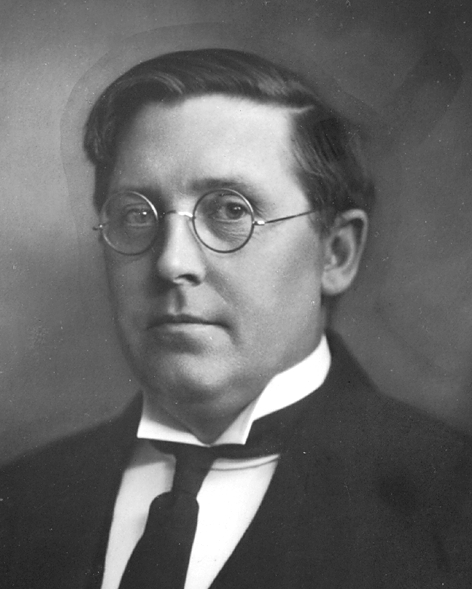
Prime Minister before	Prime Minister after
Jón Þorláksson; Conservative	Tryggvi Þórhallsson; Progressive

Parliamentary elections were held in Iceland on 9 July 1927. Voters elected all 28 seats in the Lower House of the Althing and eight of the fourteen seats in Upper House. The Progressive Party emerged as the largest party in the Lower House, winning 13 of the 28 seats.

== Results ==
Party	Votes	%	Seats			
Party	Votes	%	Lower House	+/–	Upper House	+/–
Conservative Party	13,616.5	42.54	10	New	6	New
Progressive Party	9,532.5	29.78	13	+3	6	+1
Social Democratic Party	6,097.5	19.05	3	+2	2	+2
Liberal Party	1,858	5.80	1	New	0	New
Independents	904.5	2.83	1	0	0	0
Total	32,009	100.00	28	0	14	0
Valid votes	32,009	97.21				
Invalid/blank votes	919	2.79				
Total votes	32,928	100.00				
Registered voters/turnout	46,047	71.51				
Source: Nohlen & Stöver
