= Cabinet of Ásgeir Ásgeirsson =

Government of Iceland from 1932 to 1934

- 7th Cabinet of Iceland
- 1932–1934
- Date formed: 3 June 1932
- Date dissolved: 28 July 1934

People and organisations
- Head of state: Christian X of Denmark
- Head of government: Ásgeir Ásgeirsson
- Member parties: Progressive Party; Independence Party

History
- Election: 1933 election
- Outgoing election: 1934 election
- Predecessor: Cabinet of Tryggvi Þórhallsson
- Successor: First cabinet of Hermann Jónasson

The Cabinet of Ásgeir Ásgeirsson, nicknamed “The Unity Government of Democrats” (Icelandic: Samstjórn lýðræðissinna), was formed 3 June 1932.

== Cabinets ==
=== Inaugural cabinet ===
Officeholder	Office
Ásgeir Ásgeirsson	Prime Minister
Ásgeir Ásgeirsson	Minister of Finance
Magnús Guðmundsson	Minister of Justice
Þorsteinn Briem	Minister of Employment

=== Change (11 November 1932) ===
Officeholder	Office
Ásgeir Ásgeirsson	Prime Minister
Ásgeir Ásgeirsson	Minister of Finance
Þorsteinn Briem	Minister of Employment

=== Change (14 November 1932) ===
Officeholder	Office
Ásgeir Ásgeirsson	Prime Minister
Ásgeir Ásgeirsson	Minister of Finance
Ólafur Thors	Minister of Justice
Þorsteinn Briem	Minister of Employment

=== Change (23 December 1932) ===
Officeholder	Office
Ásgeir Ásgeirsson	Prime Minister
Ásgeir Ásgeirsson	Minister of Finance
Magnús Guðmundsson	Minister of Justice
Þorsteinn Briem	Minister of Employment
