= Second cabinet of Bjarni Benediktsson =

Government of Iceland from April to December 2024

- 47th Cabinet of Iceland
- 2024
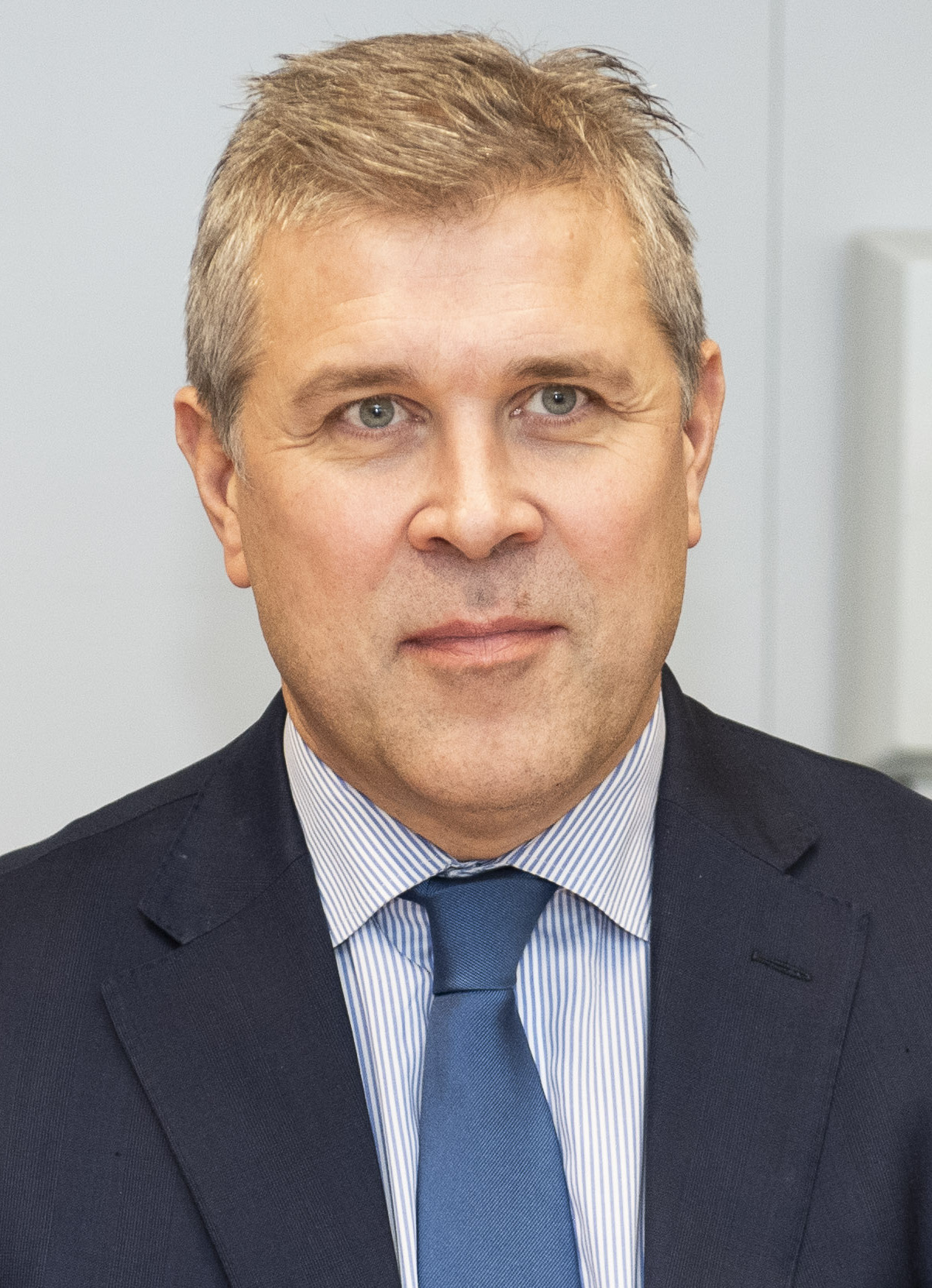
- Date formed: 9 April 2024
- Date dissolved: 21 December 2024

People and organisations
- President: Guðni Th. Jóhannesson; (to 1 August 2024); Halla Tómasdóttir; (from 1 August 2024)
- Prime Minister: Bjarni Benediktsson
- No. of ministers: 12
- Member parties: Independence Party (D); Progressive Party (B); Left-Green Movement (V) (until 17 October 2024)
- Status in legislature: Majority government (coalition) (until 17 October 2024); Minority government (coalition) (from 17 October 2024)
- Opposition parties: Social Democratic Alliance (S); People's Party (F); Pirate Party (P); Viðreisn (C); Centre Party (M)

History
- Predecessor: Katrín Jakobsdóttir II
- Successor: Kristrún Frostadóttir

The Second cabinet of Bjarni Benediktsson, nicknamed “The government of exhaustion” (Icelandic: Þreytustjórnin) or “The government of dancing chairs” (Icelandic: Stólastjórnin), was formed on 9 April 2024, following the resignation of Katrín Jakobsdóttir to run in the presidential election. The cabinet was led by Bjarni Benediktsson of the Independence Party, who previously served as Prime Minister of Iceland in 2017.

The cabinet was a coalition government consisting of the Independence Party, the Left-Green Movement and the Progressive Party. Together they hold 38 of the 63 seats in the Parliament of Iceland and served as a majority government. There were twelve ministers in the cabinet, five from the Independence Party, three from the Left-Green Movement, and four from the Progressive Party.

On 13 October 2024, Bjarni announced that the government is to be dissolved and new elections to be called on 30 November, pending final approval from the President. He cited disagreements between the governing parties on issues such as immigration and energy as the reason for ending the governing coalition. Additionally, the Left-Green Movement withdrew from the government four days later. The government was defeated at the election and Bjarni resigned from the Althing.

== Cabinet ==
The Cabinet was composed as follows:

Cabinet
Portfolio	Minister	Took office	Left office	Party
Prime Minister	Bjarni Benediktsson	9 April 2024	21 December 2024	Independence
Minister of Finance and Economic Affairs	Sigurður Ingi Jóhannsson	9 April 2024	21 December 2024	Progressive
Minister of Social Affairs and the Labour Market	Guðmundur Ingi Guðbrandsson	9 April 2024	17 October 2024	Left-Green
Minister of Social Affairs and the Labour Market	Bjarni Benediktsson	17 October 2024	21 December 2024	Independence
Minister of Infrastructure	Svandís Svavarsdóttir	9 April 2024	17 October 2024	Left-Green
Minister of Infrastructure	Sigurður Ingi Jóhannsson	17 October 2024	21 December 2024	Progressive
Minister for the Environment, Energy and Climate	Guðlaugur Þór Þórðarson	9 April 2024	21 December 2024	Independence
Minister for Foreign Affairs	Þórdís Kolbrún R. Gylfadóttir	9 April 2024	21 December 2024	Independence
Minister of Culture and Business Affairs	Lilja Dögg Alfreðsdóttir	9 April 2024	21 December 2024	Progressive
Minister of Education and Children	Ásmundur Einar Daðason	9 April 2024	21 December 2024	Progressive
Minister of Higher Education, Science And Innovation	Áslaug Arna Sigurbjörnsdóttir	9 April 2024	21 December 2024	Independence
Minister of Health	Willum Þór Þórsson	9 April 2024	21 December 2024	Progressive
Minister of Justice	Guðrún Hafsteinsdóttir	9 April 2024	21 December 2024	Independence
Minister of Food, Fisheries and Agriculture	Bjarkey Gunnarsdóttir	9 April 2024	17 October 2024	Left-Green
Minister of Food, Fisheries and Agriculture	Bjarni Benediktsson	17 October 2024	21 December 2024	Independence

== See also ==
- Government of Iceland
- Cabinet of Iceland
