= 1926 Icelandic parliamentary election =

- 1 July 1926
- 3 of the 14 seats in the Upper House of the Althing
- Turnout: 45.83%
Party	Leader	Vote %	Seats
Conservative	Jón Þorláksson	39.44	1
Progressive	Sveinn Ólafsson	24.96	1
Social Democratic	Jón Baldvinsson	22.69	1
This lists parties that won seats. See the complete results below.
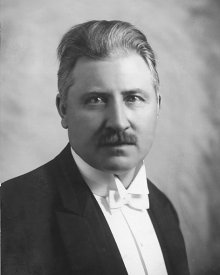

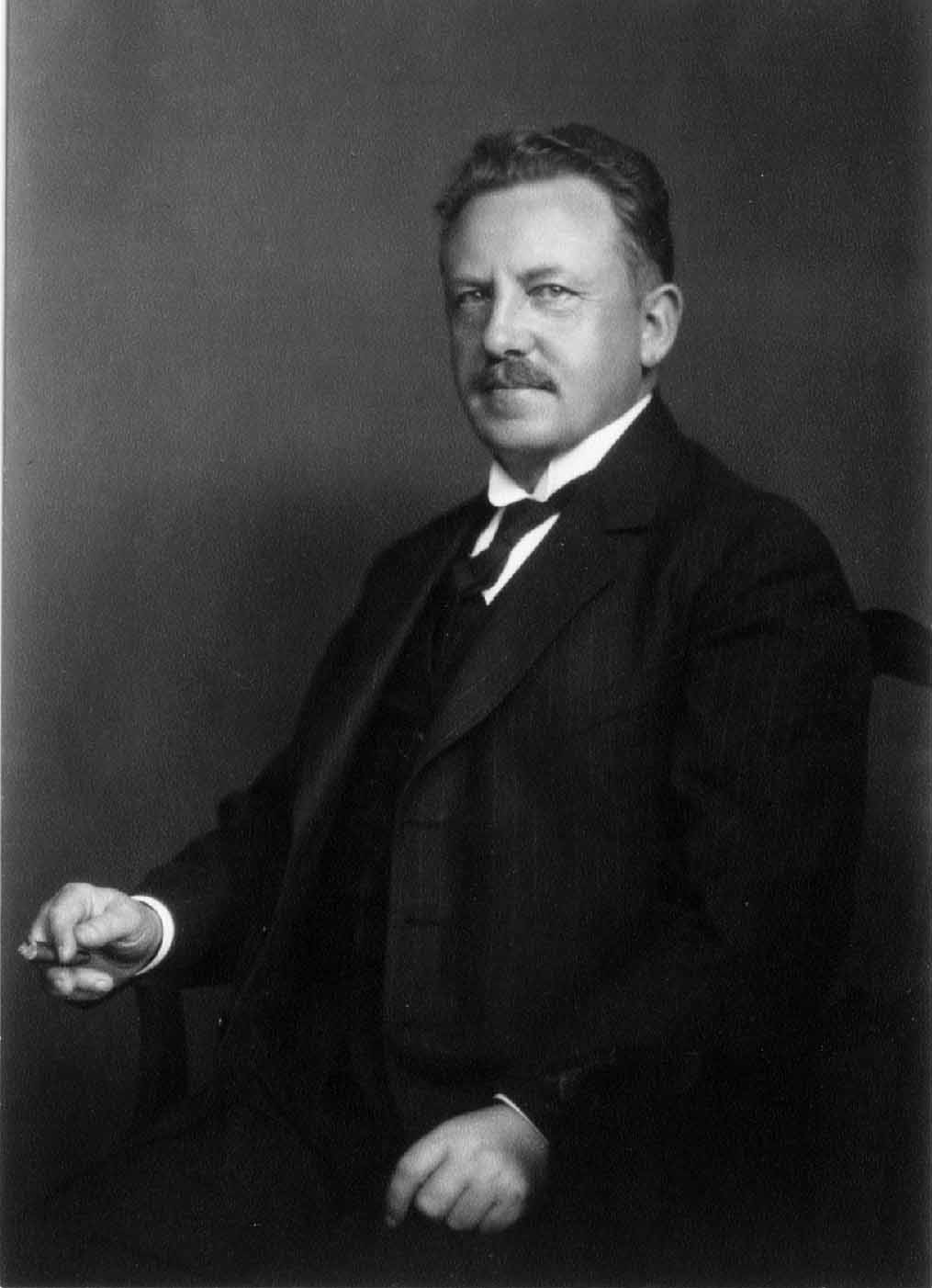
Prime Minister before	Prime Minister after
Magnús Guðmundsson (acting); Conservative	Jón Þorláksson; Conservative

Elections to the Upper House of the Althing were held in Iceland on 1 July 1926. Six seats were elected by proportional representation at the national level, using the D'Hondt method. The remaining eight seats were elected along with the Lower House.

== Results ==
Party	Votes	%	Seats
Conservative Party	5,501	39.44	1
Progressive Party	3,481	24.96	1
Social Democratic Party	3,164	22.69	1
Independence Party	1,312	9.41	0
Women's Candidate List	489	3.51	0
Total	13,947	100.00	3
Valid votes	13,947	98.91	
Invalid/blank votes	153	1.09	
Total votes	14,100	100.00	
Registered voters/turnout	30,767	45.83	
Source: Mackie & Rose, Nohlen & Stöver

=== By-election ===
A by-election was held on 23 October 1926.

Party	Votes	%	Seats
Conservative Party	8,514	55.09	1
Progressive Party	6,940	44.91	0
Total	15,454	100.00	1
Valid votes	15,454	98.45	
Invalid/blank votes	243	1.55	
Total votes	15,697	100.00	
Registered voters/turnout	31,422	49.96	
Source: Nohlen & Stöver
