= Party of Nationalists (Iceland) =

Party of Nationalists Flokkur Þjóðernissinna
- First chairman: Gísli Sigurbjörnsson
- Last chairman: Jón Aðils
- Founders: Jón Helgi Þorbergsson; Gísli Sigurbjörnsson; Eiður Sigurðsson Kvaran
- Founded: 1933; 93 years ago
- Dissolved: 1944; 82 years ago
- Headquarters: Reykjavík, Iceland
- Newspaper: Ísland; Mjölnir
- Membership: approx. 300 (1936 est.)
- Ideology: Corporate statism; Icelandic nationalism; Racial antisemitism
- Political position: Far-right

Party flag

The Party of Nationalists (Icelandic: Flokkur Þjóðernissinna) was a minor Icelandic political party that espoused a limited form of fascism before and during the Second World War.

== History ==
The party was formed in March 1934 through a merger between the Icelandic Nationalist Movement (an anti-communist and anti-democratic ginger group) and the Party of Nationalists (a politicized splinter group of the former formed in 1933). The Nationalist Movement was loosely linked to the Independence Party and when the Party of Nationalists was established many of its more conservative-minded adherents refused to join the new party. This initial departure of the more moderate tendency ensured that the Party of Nationalists proved more radical and extremist than either of its predecessor groups.

The party aimed to protect the ethnic identity of the Icelanders and believed in the supremacy of the Aryan race and anti-Semitism. They supported agricultural reform and were sympathetic to corporatism, whilst looking for the government to invest in industrialization. They also sought to abolish the Althing and replace it with a corporate parliament. The party also rejected the left-right dichotomy and presented themselves as a radical alternative for Icelandic politics. In all, they were more influenced by the ideas of Frits Clausen than those of Adolf Hitler and there is no evidence to suggest any direct link to Nazi Germany.

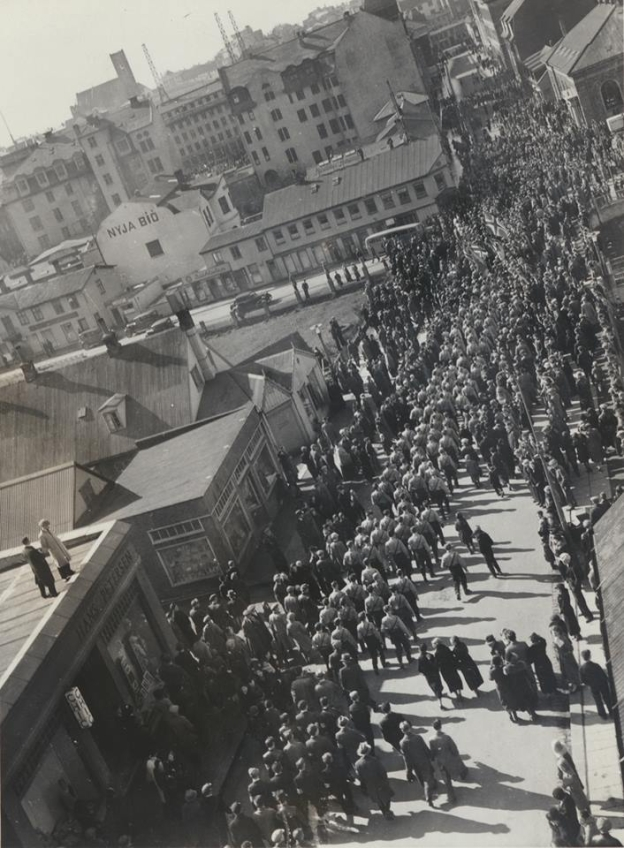
Nationalist march in Reykjavík, ca. 1930s.

Adopting some of the militaristic trappings of fascism, the party organised a number of marching squads which paraded on May 1 carrying both the Icelandic flag and the swastika. Members dressed in grey shirts and wore armbands decorated with a red swastika. The party produced a newspaper Ísland (Iceland) and a periodical Mjölnir (named after Thor's hammer), although they did not adopt the führerprinzip associated with Nazism as the movement had four different leaders in its brief life.

The Party of Nationalists failed to gain representation, except on the University of Iceland Student Council, where they held one seat for four years running. They did, however, gain attention in 1936 when they obtained a copy of the diary of the Minister of Finance and published details in Ísland. The party offices were raided by police and a number of leading members arrested, although ultimately there were no convictions. In general, however, they did not enjoy widespread support at any point in their existence This was reflected in their electoral performances, with the party gaining 0.7% of the vote in the 1934 election and 0.2% in 1937. Their best result was 2.8% in the 1934 municipal elections in Reykjavik.

The party, which never had more than 450 members, began to decline after the arrests. The marching squads appeared for the last time in 1938, whilst the 1939 Aims of the Party of Nationalists was their last major publication, apart from sporadic issues of Island. They organised a debating club in Reykjavík during the winter of 1939–1940 although it had no impact and the party generally only met in local cells from then on. Following the invasion of Iceland in 1940 the group was largely suppressed by the occupying Allies. The party was formally disbanded in 1944 when German defeat looked inevitable.

== Election results ==
Election	Votes	%	Seats	+/–	Position	Government
1934	363	0.70	0 / 49	▲0	▲6th	Opposition
1937	118	0.20	0 / 49	▼	6th	Opposition
