= Farmers' Party (Iceland, 1933) =

Defunct agrarian party in Iceland

The Farmers' Party (Icelandic: Bændaflokkur) was a political party in Iceland between 1933 and 1942.

== History ==
The party was formed in 1922 as a split from the Progressive Party, which had been formed by a merger of the original Farmers' Party and the Independent Farmers. Its founders sought to establish a party that represented the interests of farmers, rather than appealing to the broader electorate.

In the 1934 elections it won two seats in the Lower House and one seat in the Upper House of the Althing. It retained its two Lower House seats in the 1937 elections, but lost its seat in the Upper House. It was dissolved in 1942.
