= 1937 Icelandic parliamentary election =

- 29 June 1937
- All 33 seats in the Lower House and 16 seats in the Upper House of Althing
Party	Leader	Vote %	Seats	+/–
Upper House
Independence	Ólafur Thors	41.31	6	0
Progressive	Jónas frá Hriflu	24.92	7	+1
Social Democratic	Jón Baldvinsson	18.98	2	−1
Communist	Brynjólfur Bjarnason	8.44	1	+1
Lower House
Independence	Ólafur Thors	41.31	11	−3
Progressive	Jónas frá Hriflu	24.92	12	+3
Social Democratic	Jón Baldvinsson	18.98	6	−1
Communist	Brynjólfur Bjarnason	8.44	2	+2
Farmers'	Þorsteinn Briem	6.13	2	0
This lists parties that won seats. See the complete results below.
Prime Minister before	Prime Minister after
Hermann Jónasson; Progressive	Hermann Jónasson; Progressive

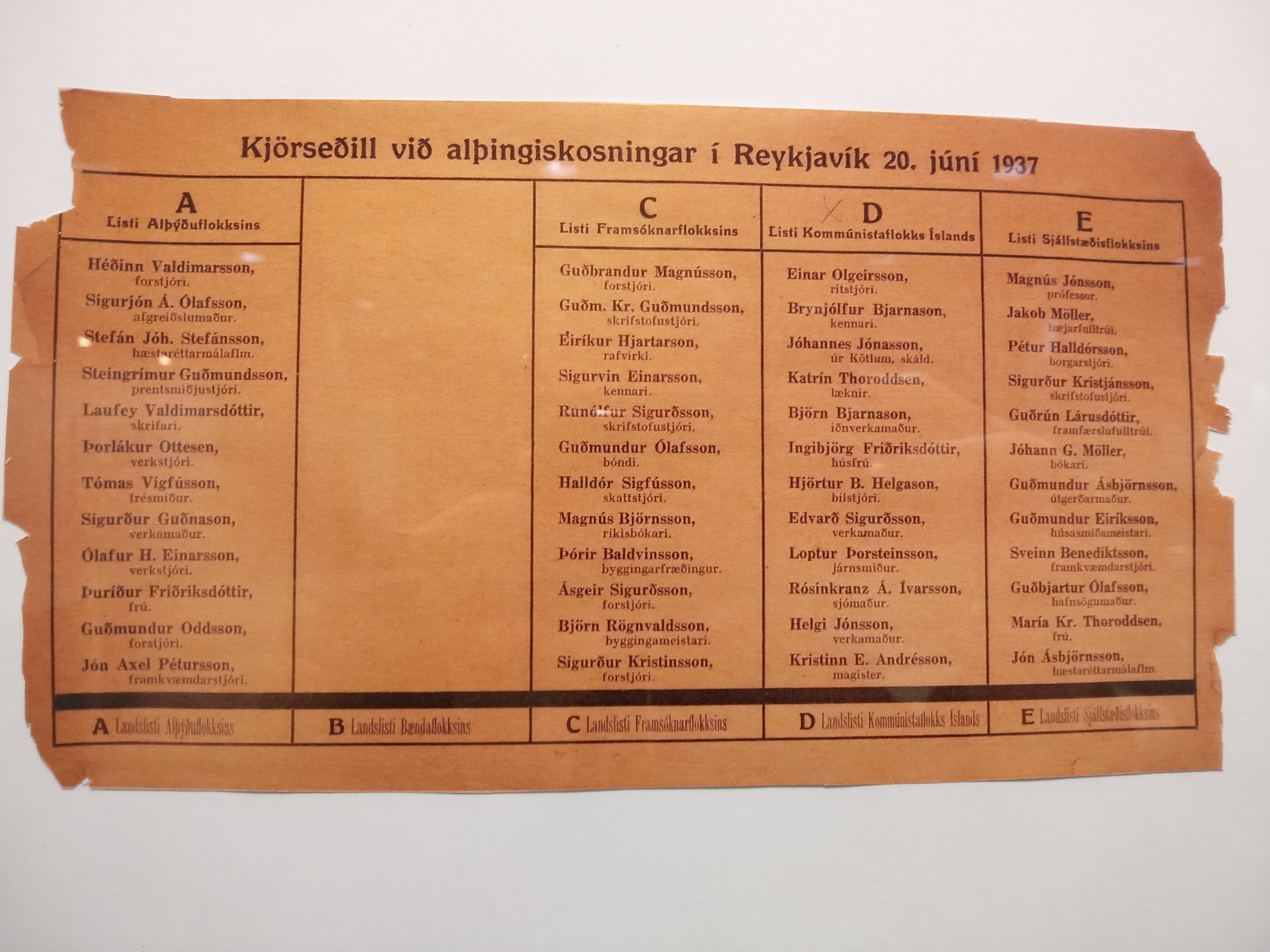
Ballot paper used for election

Parliamentary elections were held in Iceland on 29 June 1937. Although the Independence Party won a plurality of votes, the Progressive Party emerged as the largest party in the Lower House of the Althing, winning 12 of the 33 seats.

== Results ==
Party	Votes	%	Seats			
Party	Votes	%	Lower House	+/–	Upper House	+/–
Independence Party	24,132	41.31	11	–3	6	0
Progressive Party	14,556.5	24.92	12	+3	7	+1
Social Democratic Party	11,084.5	18.98	6	–1	2	–1
Communist Party	4,932.5	8.44	2	+2	1	+1
Farmers' Party	3,578.5	6.13	2	0	0	–1
Nationalist Party	118	0.20	0	0	0	0
Independents	13	0.02	0	–1	0	0
Total	58,415	100.00	33	0	16	0
Valid votes	58,415	98.85				
Invalid/blank votes	681	1.15				
Total votes	59,096	100.00				
Registered voters/turnout	67,195	87.95				
Source: Nohlen & Stöver
