= Sigfús Blöndal =

Sigfús Blöndal (2 November 1874 – 19 March 1950) was an Icelandic linguist, language author, and a librarian at the Royal Library in Copenhagen, best known for Íslensk-dönsk orðabók (Icelandic-Danish dictionary), which he wrote with his wife, Björg Þorláksdóttir Blöndal, and a small team of scholars, whose names appear on the title page.

== Works ==
It took nearly 20 years for the couple along with other scholars to compile the dictionary, which was first published in 1920–1924. Two new editions have since been published. A supplement was published in 1963 by the editors Halldór Halldórsson and Jakob Benediktsson. Blöndalsbókin (Blöndals' book) or Orðabók Blöndals (Blöndals' Dictionary), as it is usually called by Icelanders, is an essential source of the Icelandic language.

Blöndal taught Modern Icelandic at the University of Copenhagen from 1931 to 1946. He translated many ancient Greek poems into Icelandic, as well as some of the work of the modern Greek poet Aristotelis Valaoritis.

He did research on the Varangians of the Eastern Roman Empire for 25 years and completed shortly before his death an Icelandic text on the Varangians. His English-language book on the Varangians became the standard work among historians on the subject.
