= Communist Party of Iceland =

Communist Party of Iceland Kommúnistaflokkur Íslands
- Abbreviation: KFÍ
- President: Brynjólfur Bjarnason
- Founded: 29 November 1930
- Dissolved: 24 October 1938
- Merged into: People's Unity Party – Socialist Party
- Newspaper: Verkalýðsblaðið (1930 - 1936); Þjóðviljinn (1936 - 1938)
- Youth wing: Samtök ungra kommúnista (SUK)
- Ideology: Communism; Marxism–Leninism
- Political position: Far-left
- International affiliation: Comintern
- Anthem: Internasjónalinn (lit. 'The Internationale')

The Communist Party of Iceland (Icelandic: Kommúnistaflokkur Íslands) was a Marxist–Leninist communist party in Iceland from 1930 to 1938.

== History ==
Background

Great change occurred in Icelandic society around the year 1900, with a shift from an agricultural economy over to a fishing economy. With the establishment of more fishing villages, people moved from the countryside into more urbanized areas. With it came the establishment of the first labour unions in Iceland. However, as the first world war raged on in Europe, the Icelandic economy went into a slump, and many believed that the worker's unions needed to be consolidated under one entity to better protect the rights of workers. This was achieved on the 12th of March 1916, with the establishment of Icelandic Confederation of Labour, founded by seven smaller unions in Reykjavík and Hafnarfjörður. The union's political arm, the Social Democratic Party, was founded on the same day with the objective to protect the rights of Icelandic workers within the Althing, Iceland's parliament.

In the late 1910s and early 1920s, Icelandic students studying abroad in Denmark started being introduced to the writings of Karl Marx, and became influenced by the labour movements of Denmark, Germany, and Soviet Russia. They organised themselves into students clubs where they debated politics and held reading sessions. Among these students were Hendrik Jón Siemsen Ottósson and Brynjólfur Bjarnason. The demonstrations in Copenhagen in November 1918 and the German revolution was a huge influence on these students, and did much to shape their politics into a more militant form of socialism.

When Hendrik Ottósson returned to Iceland, there were mixed reactions within Icelandic society. Many advocated for background checks on all those who wished to come to Iceland, and prevent anyone who had been "corrupted" by communism from coming into the country. The government of Iceland sent a request to the Danish authorities to prevent all communists from coming to Iceland. Those who were opposed to communism typically came from Iceland's upper class, but many of those within the newly formed labour movement held more neutral or favourable views. Hendrik became known as "the Icelandic Bolshevik", and he joined the Social Democratic Party shortly after his return.

For the first few years, Icelandic communists operated within the Social Democratic Party, in working with them to further the interests of the Icelandic working class. Hendrik and Brynjólfur attended the 2nd World Congress of the Communist International, their trip being sponsored by the Social Democratic Party, where they met many leftists from all over the world, and gathered funds for the party's newspaper, Alþýðublaðið, and a proposed propaganda school in Iceland that would train European workers in propaganda.

The main ally of the communists within the Social Democratic Party was Ólafur Friðriksson, the editor of the party's newspaper, who himself was influenced by communist ideas. He attended the 3rd World Congress of the Communist International, becoming more radicalised by it. On his return to Iceland, he brought with him a Russian orphan named Nathan Friedmann, who was brought with to help translate communist writings into Icelandic, and Ólafur intended to adopt. But it was later discovered that Nathan was infected with trachoma, and the Icelandic government decided to deport him to prevent the disease from spreading. Ólafur believed that he was being targeted for his political views, and refused to hand over Nathan to the authorities. What followed was an intense brawl between Ólafur's supporters and the Icelandic police, which ended with the police retreating. The Icelandic Confederation of Labour refused to support Ólafur, and a second brawl took place, with the police being more heavily armed and having more numbers. Nathan was deported back to Denmark and Ólafur, Hendrik, and five others were sentenced to prison. This event became known as "hvíta stríðið" (the white war) and marked a turning point in the Icelandic leftist movement, since it began the division between radical communists and more moderate social democrats.

Following the white war, Ólafur and his supporters formed "Áhugalið alþýðu" (the people's interest group), a more radical section of the party which intended to seize power from within the party. They began by taking over Jafnaðarmannafélag Reykjavíkur (the Socialist association of Reykjavík), the labour movement's political arm within Reykjavík, when Ólafur was elected as the association's chairman in 1922, which strengthened his position in the party. However, not only did Ólafur face opposition form the party's right wing, but he also faced opposition from other communists, who believed that Ólafur was running the association like a dictator.

It all came to a head in October 1922 when the Socialist association of Reykjavík was invited to the 4th World Congress of the Communist International. Ólafur accepted the invitation and intended to represent the association at the congress. The right wing of the Social Democratic Party found this unacceptable and protested his decision. Ólafur refused to back down, which led to many quitting the association and forming Jafnaðarmannafélag Íslands (the Socialist association of Iceland). Ólafur was also fired as editor of the party's newspaper. To prevent a fracture within the party, the communists and social democrats formed a truce which forbade them from hostilities with each other. The communists were given four out of nine seats within the party's leadership, and Ólafur was made the party's ambassador.

Development of Communism in Reykjavík

Many communists had taken a dislike to Ólafur and his cult of personality, but could not afford to start hostilities due to his popularity within the working class. To make themselves more independent from Ólafur, they established Félag ungra kommúnista (FUK) (Association of young communists) on the 23rd of November 1922, led by Hendrik Ottósson. They began forming connections with foreign communist movements, particularly in Germany where Brynjólfur Bjarnason, Ársæll Sigurðsson, Einar Olgeirsson, and Stefán Pjetursson led a committee of Icelandic communists in Berlin. Einar and Stefán translated the Communist Manifesto into Icelandic and published 5000 copies in 1924, this being the first work of Marx or Engles to be translated. However, due to financial difficulties, Brynjólfur and Ársæll had to move back to Reykjavík in 1924, while Einar moved to Akureyri.

With the return of Brynjólfur, Einar, and Ársæll to Iceland, the division within the Social Democratic party intensified. The three students began holding lectures to Icelandic workers and spreading Leninist ideas throughout the working class. Early on in 1924, Brynjólfur and Ársæll founded Samband ungra kommúnista (SUK) (Union of young communists), and began publishing the newspaper Rauði fáninn (the Red flag). Ólafur did not like this development, and tensions began forming between him and the members of SUK. Brynjólfur, who had become a leading figure for communists in Reykjavík, viewed Ólafur as an opportunist who held no Marxist views. He and many members of FUK wished to separate the labour movement from the Social Democratic Party, and believed that Ólafur stood in their way.

FUK began making deeper connections with the Comintern, who encouraged Icelandic communists to intensify their battle with the Social Democrats. Brynjólfur attended the 5th World Congress of the Communist International, where he received instructions to intensify FUK's criticism of the Social Democratic leadership. Upon his arrival back home, a conflict came up between him and Ólafur, with the latter refusing to criticise the Social Democratic leader, Jón Baldvinsson. The conflict within the left arm of the party led to the formation of Fræðslufélag kommúnista (the Communist educational association), which was meant to mediate between Ólafur and FUK, but it turned out unfruitful, and it was shut down in November 1925. Shortly after, the conflict between Ólafur and FUK boiled over when FUK withdrew themselves from the Socialist association of Reykjavík, and a year later on 17 November 1926, they formed their own association called "Jafnaðarmannafélagið Sparta" (the Sparta Socialist association), with the goal of spreading Marxist-Leninist thought and opposing the social democrats within Reykjavík's labour unions. The association was organised around a Marxist-Leninist structure and was led by a board of three members, with harsh requirements for membership. Brynjólfur Bjarnason was their leader, and soon became one of the most influential communists in Iceland.

Development of Communism in Akureyri

The communist movement developed a little differently in Akureyri compared to Reykjavík, a difference that would come to define the Communist Party later on. There were two labour unions in the town, but their cooperation was minimal and their leaderships were dominated by conservatives. This meant that the social democrats had an incredibly weak presence in the town, and when the communist Einar Olgeirsson arrived there from Berlin in 1924, he had to take a different approach from the communists of Reykjavík. While those in Reykjavík focused on combatting social democratic influence within Reykajvík's labour unions, Einar had to build Akureyri's labour movement from the ground up, and he could not do so without heavy cooperation with the social democrats. He formed Jafnaðarmannafélag Akureyrar (Socialist association of Akureyri) on the 3rd of July 1924, with the objective to strengthen the labour movement in Akureyri, protect the rights of workers, and spread socialist ideas within the labour unions of the whole of Northern Iceland. Socialist associations were established in surrounding towns, and many socialist seminars were sponsored by the association.

Einar helped establish Verklýðssamband Norðurlands, a cooperative between different labour unions spanning all of Northern Iceland. By the end of 1928, it was composed of 11 different labour unions. With Einar's efforts, the presence of the Social Democrats began to strengthen greatly, with them winning the town elections in 1925 for the first time, and by 1927 was the largest political party in all of Akureyri. In 1926 the Social Democrats won Akureyri's seat in parliament.

While the communist movement in Reykjavík (Sparta) was identified as a hardliner group that followed the Moscow line, the Akureyri communist movement was distinct in how heavily it relied on cooperation with the social democrats. This also affected the leaders of both groups, with Brynjólfur being a hardliner who opposed any cooperation with the social democrats while Einar was more moderate. This meant that that Sparta held relatively little power within the labour movement in Reykjavík, while Einar was very influential.

The Socialist association of Akureyri began publishing articles in the newspaper Verkamaðurinn, until they acquired the influential newspaper Réttur, which helped spread socialist ideas among the workers of Northern Iceland.

Due to the difference in policy, a divide began forming between the communists of Reykjavík and those in Akureyri. Those in Reykjavík viewed Einar and his supporters as romantic revolutionaries, saying that they were closer to Jacobins rather than Bolsheviks. Einar wished to establish a broad leftist party compromising a united front between communists, socialists, and social democrats. Meanwhile, Brynjólfur rejected any notion of a united front and wished to establish a Marxist-Leninist party.

The formation of the Communist Party

The communists had been planning on forming their own party for a while, with their main hurdle being the lack of influence within Iceland's unions. However, when they began gaining more influence, their confidence grew, and they began their preparations for their new party. At the same time, tensions between them and the social democrats began growing. The Social Democratic Party was facing pressure from the Danish Social Democrats to cease their cooperation with the communists. From 1926 onwards the two factions became more hostile against each other, and the communists became increasingly antagonistic, accusing the social democrats of betraying the Icelandic working class.

Brynjólfur and Einar had clashing views on who would lead the new communist party, Einar wishing to lead it from Akureyri and disconnected from the Comintern while Brynjólfur wished to lead it from Reykjavík with full membership in the Comintern. In 1928, following the advice of the Comintern, the communists began their preparations to form their new party. Brynjólfur had the upper hand over Einar, with the party being centered in Reykjavík, built on a Marxist-Leninist structure with full membership in the Comintern. They would refuse any notion of a popular front, and would prepare for a worker's revolution in Iceland.

Finally, on the 19th of November 1930, the tensions boiled over during a meeting of the Social Democratic Party. All communists left the party and on the 26th of November, the founding congress of the party was held, with the Communist Party of Iceland (KFÍ) being officially founded on the 29th of November 1930. They applied for a membership in the Comintern, and SUK was transformed into the party's youth wing.

In 1938, another splinter group, which had left the social democrats the year before, unified itself with the communists forming the Popular Unity Party - Socialist Party (Sameiningarflokkur alþýðu - Sósíalistaflokkurinn). The new party did not continue the Comintern membership. However, the communists were dominant in the party and it was mostly the same as its predecessor. In 1956 the Socialist Party formed the People's Alliance as an electoral alliance with yet another splinter group from the Social Democratic Party. The People's Alliance became a political party in 1968.

== Election results ==
Election	Votes	Vote %	Seats	Place
1931	1,165	3.0	0	4th
1933	2,673.5 ▲	7.5 ▲	0	4th
1934	3,098 ▲	6.0 ▼	0	5th ▼
1937	4,932.5 ▲	8.4 ▲	3 ▲	4th ▲
