= 1930 Icelandic parliamentary election =

- 15 June 1930
- 3 of the 14 seats in the Upper House of Althing
- Turnout: 70.50%
Party	Leader	Vote %	Seats
Independence	Jón Þorláksson	48.33	2
Progressive	Tryggvi Þórhallsson	31.41	1
This lists parties that won seats. See the complete results below.
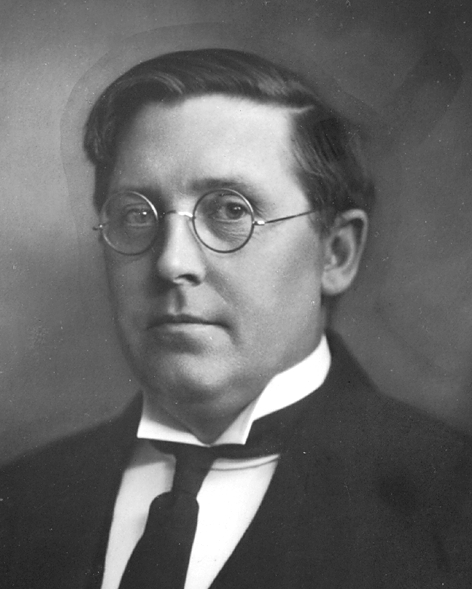

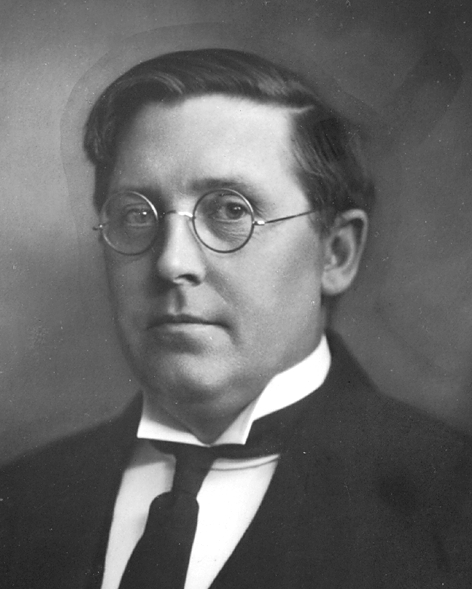
Prime Minister before	Prime Minister after
Tryggvi Þórhallsson; Progressive	Tryggvi Þórhallsson; Progressive

Elections to the Upper House of the Althing were held in Iceland on 15 June 1930. Following reforms in 1915, the six seats in the Upper House appointed by the monarch were abolished, and replaced with six elected seats. The seats were elected by proportional representation at the national level, using the D'Hondt method. The remaining eight seats were elected along with the Lower House. This was the last election solely for the Upper House, as from 1934 onwards all Upper House members were elected together with the Lower House.

== Results ==
Party	Votes	%	Seats
Independence Party	11,671	48.33	2
Progressive Party	7,585	31.41	1
Social Democratic Party	4,893	20.26	0
Total	24,149	100.00	3
Valid votes	24,149	99.39	
Invalid/blank votes	149	0.61	
Total votes	24,298	100.00	
Registered voters/turnout	34,467	70.50	
Source: Mackie & Rose, Nohlen & Stöver
