= First cabinet of Hermann Jónasson =

Government of Iceland from 1934 to 1938

- 8th Cabinet of Iceland
- 1934–1938
- Date formed: 28 July 1934
- Date dissolved: 2 April 1938

People and organisations
- Head of state: Christian X of Denmark
- Head of government: Hermann Jónasson
- Member parties: Progressive Party; Social Democratic Party

History
- Outgoing election: 1937 election
- Predecessor: Cabinet of Ásgeir Ásgeirsson
- Successor: Second cabinet of Hermann Jónasson

The First cabinet of Hermann Jónasson, nicknamed “The Government of the working classes” (Icelandic: Stjórn hinna vinnandi stétta), was formed 28 July 1934.

== Cabinets ==
=== Inaugural cabinet ===
Officeholder	Office
Hermann Jónasson	Prime Minister
Hermann Jónasson	Minister of Justice and Ecclesiastical Affairs
Eysteinn Jónsson	Minister of Finance
Haraldur Guðmundsson	Minister of Employment

=== Change (20 March 1938) ===
Officeholder	Office
Hermann Jónasson	Prime Minister
Hermann Jónasson	Minister of Justice and Ecclesiastical Affairs
Hermann Jónasson	Minister of Employment
Eysteinn Jónsson	Minister of Finance
