= Second cabinet of Jón Magnússon =

Government of Iceland from 1920 to 1922

- 2nd Cabinet of Iceland
- 1920–1922
- Date formed: 25 February 1920
- Date dissolved: 7 March 1922

People and organisations
- Head of state: Christian X of Denmark
- Head of government: Jón Magnússon
- Member parties: Home Rule Party; independents

History
- Predecessor: First cabinet of Jón Magnússon
- Successor: Cabinet of Sigurður Eggerz

The Second cabinet of Jón Magnússon, nicknamed “The First Citizen Government” (Icelandic: Borgarastjórn I), was formed 25 February 1920.

== Cabinets ==
=== Inaugural cabinet ===
| Officeholder | Office |
|---|---|
| Jón Magnússon | Prime Minister |
| Jón Magnússon | Minister of Justice and Ecclesiastical Affairs |
| Magnús Guðmundsson | Minister of Finance |
| Pétur Jónsson | Minister of Employment |

=== Change (20 January 1922) ===
| Officeholder | Office |
|---|---|
| Jón Magnússon | Prime Minister |
| Jón Magnússon | Minister of Justice and Ecclesiastical Affairs |
| Magnús Guðmundsson | Minister of Finance |
| Magnús Guðmundsson | Minister of Employment |
