= Björg Carítas Þorláksson =

- Born: Björg Carítas Þorláksdóttir; 30 January 1874 from Vesturhópshólar in Vestur-Húnavatnssýsla, Iceland
- Died: 25 March 1934 (aged 60); Copenhagen, Denmark
- Other names: Björg Blöndal, Bjorg Caritas Thorlaksson, Björg Karítas Thorláksdóttir, Björg Karítas Þorláksson
- Occupation: academic
- Years active: 1894–1934
- Known for: first Icelandic woman to attain a PhD

Björg Carítas Þorláksson (also cited as Bjorg Caritas Thorlaksson; 30 January 1874 – 25 February 1934) was an Icelandic scholar and teacher. After earning her teaching certificate in Ytriey she taught for three years and studied in Denmark, before applying to the Reykjavík Junior College to further her education. Refused admittance, she moved back to Copenhagen and earned a Danish teaching degree. She studied at the Athens Classes to learn Greek and Latin and was admitted to graduate study at the University of Copenhagen. After her marriage, she abandoned her studies to work on the preparation of an Icelandic-Danish Dictionary, for the next two decades with her husband. When the dictionary was completed, his work was recognized and hers was not. Divorcing, she moved to Paris and attained a PhD, the first woman in Iceland to attain the distinction. Suffering from ill-health, she published until her death from breast cancer.

== Early life ==
Björg Carítas Þorláksdóttir was born in Vesturhópshólar of Vestur-Húnavatnssýsla County, Iceland to Margrétar Jónsdóttur and Þorláks Símonar Þorláksson Her mother raised the children, Sigurbjörg, who would become a teacher; Magnús, who was later a farmer; and Jón, who became the Prime Minister of Iceland, along with Björg. Their father was farmer and the mayor of Vesturhópshólar and her maternal grandfather Jón Eiríksson was the priest of Undirfell (is). She studied at the women's school at Ytriey from 1891 to 1894, earning her teaching credentials.

== Career ==
As soon as she graduated, Björg began working as a teacher and taught for the next three years. In 1897, she went to Copenhagen with her brother Jón to further her education. She enrolled in the school taught by Natalie Zahle but left after a year and applied to study at the Lærða skólanum (The Learned School) at the Reykjavík Junior College. Her application was not approved and she remained in Copenhagen to finish her teaching degree. In 1900, she completed her degree from the Lyceum in Copenhagen and then attended courses at the Athens Classes to study Greek and Latin. She again applied to attend Reykjavik Junior College as a sixth year student, but was rejected because school policy allowed women to take a matriculation examination, but not attend classes. Instead, Björg enrolled at Nørrebro's Latin and Real School (da) in Copenhagen, graduating with her bachelor's degree in 1901. The following year, she passed the PhD candidacy examination for the University of Copenhagen and enrolled in classes.

In 1903, Björg married Sigfús Blöndal, a bookkeeper at the Royal Danish Library. Björg took his name and became known as Björg Blöndal. Together, they embarked on a project to create an Icelandic-Danish dictionary. The work took them nearly twenty years to complete, in part due to several bouts of illness. Blöndal was diagnosed with tuberculosis in 1907 and spent most of 1908 in a tubercular hospital. She did not fully recover her health until 1911. In 1919, she was hospitalized at the state hospital in Copenhagen for lung cancer, but the tumor was found to be benign. When their dictionary was published in 1920–1924, only her husband's work was recognized. Upon completion of the work, the couple's marriage fell apart and they filed for divorce. Sigfús was granted an honorary doctorate from the University of Iceland in 1924, but Björg was not. She took the name Björg C. Þorláksson (Björg C. Thorláksson) and moved to Paris. Her divorce was finally granted in 1925, by which time, Þorláksson was studying at the Sorbonne.

Þorláksson prepared her thesis, Le fondement physiologique des instincts des systèmes nutritif, neuromuscular et genital (The physiological basis of the instincts of the nutritive, neuromuscular and genital systems), which evaluated whether instinct was prompted by biology. She graduated in 1926 as the first Icelandic woman to achieve a doctorate degree. In 1928 the tumors returned and she underwent radiation therapy in Paris. She was put in an asylum, against her will, as it was believed she was suffering from delusions.

== Death and legacy ==
Þorláksson died of breast cancer on 25 February 1934 in Copenhagen. In 2000, money was raised to erect a copy of Ásmundur Sveinsson's 1928 bust of Þorláksson to be installed in her honor at the University of Iceland. It now stands in front of Oddi, the social sciences building at the University of Iceland. In 2001, Sigríður Dúna Kristmundsdóttir (is) published a biography of Þorláksson, Björg: Ævisaga Bjargar C. Þorláksson (Björg: Life story of Björg C. Þorláksson) with JPV Publishing.

== Selected works ==
In addition to her own writing, Þorláksson published work as a translator. Works she authored include:

- Kvindevalgrettens Sejr paa Island o. fl. í Kvinden og Samfundet (Women's Victory in Iceland, etc. in Women and Society), Copenhagen 1915
- Dansk-íslensk orðabók (Danish-Icelandic Dictionary, co-authored with Sigfús Blöndal, 1920–1924)
- Erindi um menntamál kvenna (Women's Education), Reykjavík 1925
- Le fondement physiologique des instincts des systèmes nutritif, neuromuscular et genital (The physiological basis of the instincts of the nutritive, neuromuscular and genital systems), Paris 1926
- Svefn og draumar (Sleeping and Dreaming), Reykjavík 1926–1928
- Leikur lífsins (Game of Life), Reykjavík 1927
- Mataræði og þjóðþrif (Diet and Nationality), Reykjavík 1930
- Daglegar máltíðir (Daily Meals), Reykjavík 1933
- Ljóðmæli (Poetry), Reykjavík 1934.
