= Brynjólfur Bjarnason =

Icelandic politician (1898–1989)

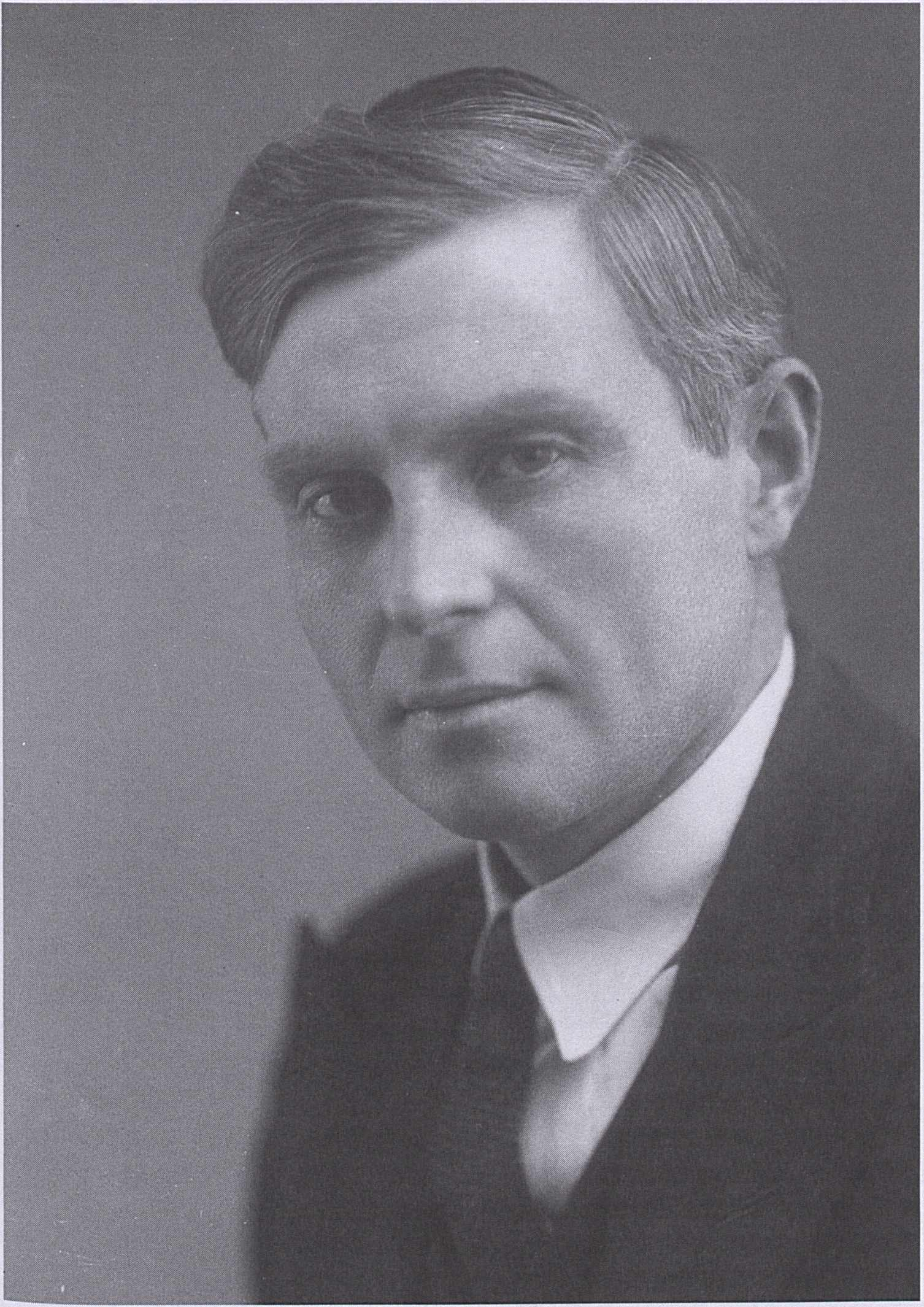

Minister of Education and Culture of Iceland
- In office 21 October 1944 – 4 February 1947
- President: Sveinn Björnsson
- Prime Minister: Ólafur Thors
- Preceded by: Björn Þórðarson
- Succeeded by: Eysteinn Jónsson

Personal details
- Born: 26 May 1898 Hæli, Gnúpverjahreppur, Iceland
- Died: 16 April 1989 (aged 90) Roskilde, Denmark
- Party: Communist Party of Iceland; People's Unity Party – Socialist Party; People's Alliance
- Education: University of Copenhagen; Friedrich Wilhelm University

Brynjólfur Bjarnason (26 May 1898 – 16 April 1989) was an Icelandic communist politician and philosopher.

== Biography ==
Bjarnason was born in Hæli in Gnúpverjahreppur. In 1918 he started studying philosophy at the University of Copenhagen, graduating with a bachelor's degree in 1919. He continued to study natural sciences at the same university until 1922 but did not graduate, instead continuing his studies in philosophy at the Friedrich Wilhelm University in Berlin in 1923–1924. After returning to Iceland, he worked as a teacher from 1926.

Bjarnason attended the 2nd Congress of the Comintern in Moscow in 1920 and the 5th Congress in 1924, as a representative of Iceland. In 1930, he became the chairman of the Communist Party of Iceland upon its founding. He remained in this position until the party merged into the People's Unity Party – Socialist Party in 1938. In 1935 he represented the Communist Party of Iceland at the 7th Congress of the Comintern.

In the years 1938–1949 Bjarnason was a member of the Central Committee of the People's Unity Party – Socialist Party. He was a member of the Althing, the Icelandic parliament, in the years 1937–1942 and 1946–1956. Bjarnason served as Iceland's Minister of Education and Culture in 1944–1947.

As Bjarnason's direct political involvement decreased from the 1950's, he devoted most of his time to the study of philosophy. He wrote several books dealing with subjects such as metaphysics and epistemology. Bjarnason also translated works by Karl Marx, Friedrich Engels and Mao Zedong into Icelandic. He died in Roskilde, Denmark in 1989.
