= Bjørg Brynhildardóttir Egholm =

Faroese politician (born 2005)

Member of the Løgting
- Incumbent
- Assumed office 26 March 2026

Personal details
- Born: 7 November 2005 (age 20)
- Party: Republic

Bjørg Brynhildardóttir Egholm (born 7 November 2005) is a Faroese politician serving as a member of the Løgting since 2026. She is the youngest-ever member of the Løgting.
