= Third cabinet of Hermann Jónasson =

Government of Iceland from 1939 to 1941

- 10th Cabinet of Iceland
- 1939–1941
- Date formed: 17 April 1939
- Date dissolved: 18 November 1941

People and organisations
- Head of state: Christian X of Denmark
- Head of government: Hermann Jónasson
- Member parties: national unity government: Progressive Party; Independence Party; Social Democratic Party

History
- Predecessor: Second cabinet of Hermann Jónasson
- Successor: Fourth cabinet of Hermann Jónasson

The Third cabinet of Hermann Jónasson, nicknamed “The National Government” (Icelandic: Þjóðstjórnin), was formed 17 April 1939.

== Cabinet ==
=== Inaugural cabinet ===
Officeholder	Office
Hermann Jónasson	Prime Minister
Hermann Jónasson	Minister of Justice and Ecclesiastical Affairs
Eysteinn Jónsson	Minister of Business Affairs
Jakob Möller	Minister of Finance
Ólafur Thors	Minister of Employment and Transport
Stefán Jóhann Stefánsson	Minister for Foreign and Social Affairs
