= Cabinet of Sigurður Eggerz =

Government of Iceland from 1922 to 1924

- 3rd Cabinet of Iceland
- 1922–1924
- Date formed: 7 March 1922
- Date dissolved: 22 March 1924

People and organisations
- Head of state: Christian X of Denmark
- Head of government: Sigurður Eggerz
- Member parties: Independence Party; Progressive Party; independents

History
- Election: 1922 election
- Outgoing election: 1923 election
- Predecessor: Second cabinet of Jón Magnússon
- Successor: Third cabinet of Jón Magnússon

The Cabinet of Sigurður Eggerz, nicknamed “The Second Citizen Government” (Icelandic: Borgarastjórn II), was formed 7 March 1922.

== Cabinets ==
=== Inaugural cabinet ===
| Officeholder | Office |
|---|---|
| Sigurður Eggerz | Prime Minister |
| Sigurður Eggerz | Minister of Justice and Ecclesiastical Affairs |
| Klemens Jónsson | Minister of Employment |
| Magnús Jónsson | Minister of Finance |

=== Change (18 April 1923) ===
| Officeholder | Office |
|---|---|
| Sigurður Eggerz | Prime Minister |
| Sigurður Eggerz | Minister of Justice and Ecclesiastical Affairs |
| Klemens Jónsson | Minister of Employment |
| Klemens Jónsson | Minister of Finance |
