= Daði Már Kristófersson =

Icelandic politician (born 1971)

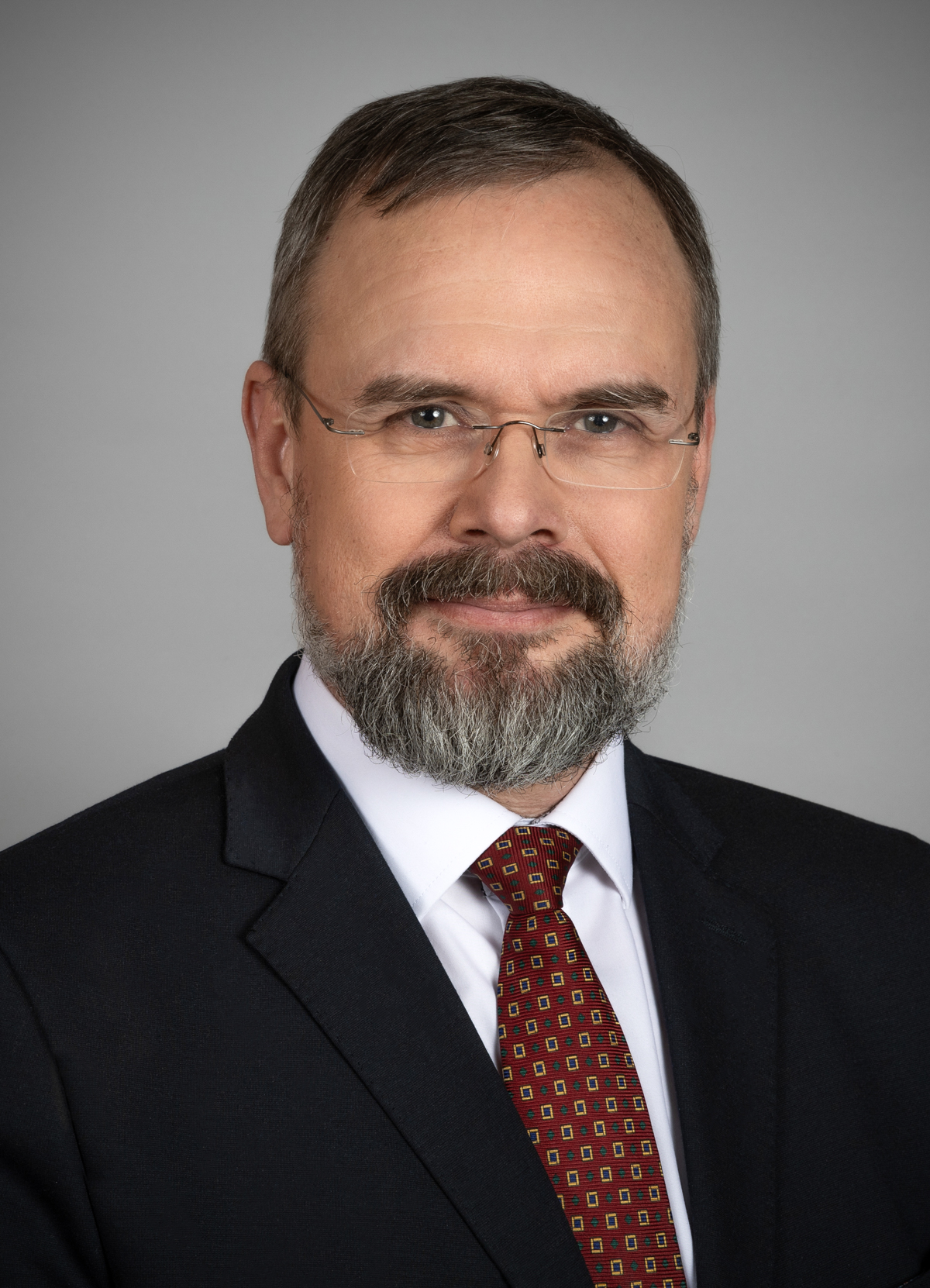
- Official portrait, 2025

Minister of Finance and Economic Affairs
- Incumbent
- Assumed office 21 December 2024
- Prime Minister: Kristrún Frostadóttir
- Preceded by: Sigurður Ingi Jóhannsson

Personal details
- Born: 22 October 1971 (age 54)
- Party: Viðreisn
- Spouse: Ásta Hlín Ólafsdóttir
- Relations: Valgerður Bjarnadóttir (stepmother); Bjarni Benediktsson (stepgrandfather)
- Children: 4

Daði Már Kristófersson (born 22 October 1971) is an Icelandic politician serving as minister of finance and economic affairs since 2024. He is the deputy leader of Viðreisn.
