= Second cabinet of Hermann Jónasson =

Government of Iceland from 1938 to 1939

- 9th Cabinet of Iceland
- 1938–1939
- Date formed: 2 April 1938
- Date dissolved: 17 April 1939

People and organisations
- Head of state: Christian X of Denmark
- Head of government: Hermann Jónasson
- Member party: Progressive Party

History
- Predecessor: First cabinet of Hermann Jónasson
- Successor: Third cabinet of Hermann Jónasson

The Second cabinet of Hermann Jónasson, nicknamed “The Government of the working classes” (Icelandic: Stjórn hinna vinnandi stétta), was formed 2 April 1938.

== Cabinet ==
=== Inaugural cabinet ===
Officeholder	Office
Hermann Jónasson	Prime Minister
Hermann Jónasson	Minister of Justice and Ecclesiastical Affairs
Eysteinn Jónsson	Minister of Finance
Skúli Guðmundsson	Minister of Employment
