= Ministry of Finance (Iceland) =

Government ministry of Iceland

Coordinates: 64°08′52″N 21°55′54″W

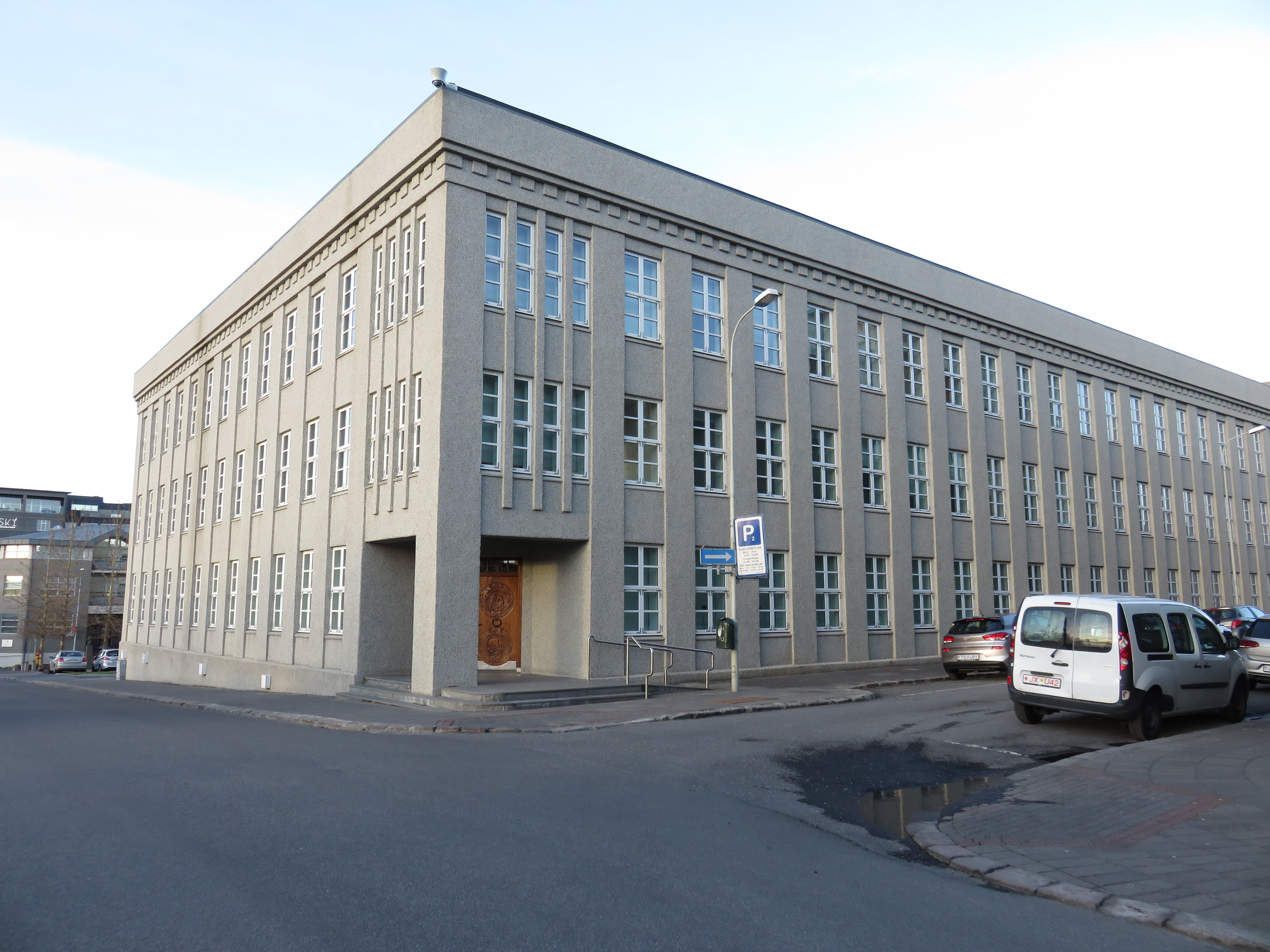
Headquarters of the ministry

The Icelandic Ministry of Finance (Icelandic: Fjármálaráðuneytið) is responsible for overseeing the finances of the Icelandic government. The Minister for Finance and Economic Affairs is Daði Már Kristófersson.

== Organization of the Ministry of Finance ==
The top civil servant in the Ministry of Finance is Baldur Gudlaugsson, who was appointed Permanent Secretary from 1 November 2000. From 6 February to 30 April 2009, Indridi H. Thorlaksson is acting Permanent Secretary while Mr. Gudlaugsson is on leave. He runs the ministry on a day-to-day basis and is the chief liaison between the Minister and the civil servants. There are six departments of the Ministry of Finance, each of which is headed by a Director-General. The Ministry staff numbers around 80 specialists and support personnel.

=== Administration Department ===
The Administration Department is responsible for general operations of the Ministry, preparation of the ministry's annual operational budget and supervision of the Ministry's information services. It is headed by Angantyr Einarsson since 1 September 2007.

=== Budget Department ===
The Budget Department's main job is to oversee the production of the government's fiscal budget. In addition the Budget Department provides support for the supplementary budget and the government accounts bill. The Budget Office oversees relations with other Ministries and the Parliament concerning the preparation of the Treasury's budget. Nokkvi Bragason is in charge of this department since 1 March 2008.

=== Economic Department ===
The Economic Department is in charge of economic studies in Iceland. This involves surveying the economic situation and its prospects, and forecasting economic trends based on macroeconomic models. The Economic Department is also responsible for providing the revenue forecast for the fiscal budget and performing research into tax and benefit systems. The department oversees the Treasury’s domestic and international cooperation concerning economic matters. Thorsteinn Thorgeirsson is Director-General for this department since 1 January 2005.

=== Financial Management Department ===
The Financial Management Department manages the government's assets and the Treasury fund. This department also ensures the proposed budget is carried out as per legal requirements and that the executive branch is run efficiently. The Director-General of this department is Thorhallur Arason.

=== Personnel Policy Department ===
The main role of the Personnel Policy Department is to represent the Ministry in labor market matters and to present its views. The department also offers advice on the implementation and interpretation of laws, regulations, agreements and government decisions. The Wage Negotiations Committee of the government operates in close cooperation with the department. Gunnar Bjornsson is in charge of this department.

=== Taxation and Legal Affairs Department ===
The main task of the department is to deal with tax matters, to draft bills for the Althingi and interpret existing laws. It also conducts research into the impact of existing taxes and tax changes. The Director-General of this department is Marianna Jonasdottir.

== Goals of the Ministry ==
The Ministry's main goals are:

- Economic stability and a high standard of living
- A balanced treasury over the longer term
- An economical and efficient tax environment
- Responsible and performance oriented management of state finances
- Transparent government operations and an effective organizational structure
- State of staff of the highest quality
- Delivery of a reliable service with the emphasis on professional work

== List of Ministers of Finance ==
=== Kingdom of Iceland (1918–1944) ===
No.	Minister	Took office	Left office	Duration	Party	Cabinet
1	Björn Kristjánsson (1858–1939)	4 January 1917	28 August 1917	7 months and 24 days (236 days)		Jón Magnússon I
2	Sigurður Eggerz (1875–1945)	28 August 1917	25 February 1920	2 years, 5 months and 28 days (911 days)		Jón Magnússon I
3	Magnús Guðmundsson (1879–1937)	25 February 1920	7 March 1922	2 years and 10 days (741 days)		Jón Magnússon II
4	Magnús Jónsson (1887–1958)	7 March 1922	18 April 1923	1 year, 1 month and 11 days (407 days)		Sigurður Eggerz
5	Klemens Jónsson (1862–1930)	18 April 1923	22 March 1924	11 months and 4 days (339 days)	HRP	Sigurður Eggerz
6	Jón Þorláksson (1877–1935)	22 March 1924	28 August 1927	3 years, 5 months and 6 days (1,254 days)	CP	Jón Magnússon III
6	Jón Þorláksson (1877–1935)	22 March 1924	28 August 1927	3 years, 5 months and 6 days (1,254 days)	CP	Jón Þorláksson
7	Magnús Kristjánsson (1862–1928)	28 August 1927	8 December 1928	1 year, 3 months and 10 days (468 days)	PP	Tryggvi Þórhallsson
8	Tryggvi Þórhallsson (1889–1935)	8 December 1928	7 March 1929	2 months and 27 days (89 days)	PP	Tryggvi Þórhallsson
9	Einar Árnason (1875–1947)	7 March 1929	20 April 1931	2 years, 1 month and 13 days (774 days)	PP	Tryggvi Þórhallsson
(8)	Tryggvi Þórhallsson (1889–1935)	20 April 1931	20 August 1931	4 months (122 days)	PP	Tryggvi Þórhallsson
10	Ásgeir Ásgeirsson (1894–1972)	20 August 1931	28 July 1934	2 years, 11 months and 8 days (1,073 days)	PP	
10	Ásgeir Ásgeirsson (1894–1972)	20 August 1931	28 July 1934	2 years, 11 months and 8 days (1,073 days)	PP	Ásgeir Ásgeirsson
11	Eysteinn Jónsson (1906–1993)	28 July 1934	17 April 1939	4 years, 8 months and 20 days (1,724 days)	PP	Hermann Jónasson I
11	Eysteinn Jónsson (1906–1993)	28 July 1934	17 April 1939	4 years, 8 months and 20 days (1,724 days)	PP	Hermann Jónasson II
12	Jakob Möller (1880–1955)	17 April 1939	16 December 1942	3 years, 7 months and 29 days (1,339 days)	IP	Hermann Jónasson III
12	Jakob Möller (1880–1955)	17 April 1939	16 December 1942	3 years, 7 months and 29 days (1,339 days)	IP	Hermann Jónasson IV
12	Jakob Möller (1880–1955)	17 April 1939	16 December 1942	3 years, 7 months and 29 days (1,339 days)	IP	Ólafur Thors I
13	Björn Ólafsson (1895–1974)	16 December 1942	21 October 1944	1 year, 10 months and 5 days (675 days)	Ind.	Björn Þórðarson

=== Republic of Iceland (1944–present) ===
No.	Minister	Took office	Left office	Duration	Party	Cabinet
14	Pétur Magnússon (1888–1948)	21 October 1944	4 February 1947	2 years, 3 months and 14 days (836 days)	IP	Ólafur Thors II
15	Jóhann Þ. Jósefsson (1886–1961)	4 February 1947	6 December 1949	2 years, 10 months and 2 days (1,036 days)	IP	Stefán Jóhann Stefánsson
(13)	Björn Ólafsson (1895–1974)	6 December 1949	14 March 1950	3 months and 8 days (98 days)	IP	Ólafur Thors III
(11)	Eysteinn Jónsson (1906–1993)	14 March 1950	14 April 1954	4 years and 1 month (1,492 days)	PP	Steingrímur Steinþórsson
(11)	Eysteinn Jónsson (1906–1993)	14 March 1950	14 April 1954	4 years and 1 month (1,492 days)	PP	Ólafur Thors IV
16	Skúli Guðmundsson (1924–2002)	14 April 1954	8 September 1954	4 months and 25 days (147 days)	PP	Ólafur Thors IV
(11)	Eysteinn Jónsson (1906–1993)	8 September 1954	23 December 1958	4 years, 3 months and 15 days (1,567 days)	PP	Ólafur Thors IV
(11)	Eysteinn Jónsson (1906–1993)	8 September 1954	23 December 1958	4 years, 3 months and 15 days (1,567 days)	PP	Hermann Jónasson V
17	Guðmundur Í. Guðmundsson (1909–1987)	23 December 1958	20 November 1959	10 months and 28 days (332 days)	SDP	Emil Jónsson
18	Gunnar Thoroddsen (1910–1983)	20 November 1959	8 May 1965	5 years, 5 months and 18 days (1,996 days)	IP	Ólafur Thors V
18	Gunnar Thoroddsen (1910–1983)	20 November 1959	8 May 1965	5 years, 5 months and 18 days (1,996 days)	IP	Bjarni Benediktsson
19	Magnús Jónsson (1919–1984)	8 May 1965	14 July 1971	6 years, 2 months and 6 days (2,258 days)	IP	Bjarni Benediktsson
19	Magnús Jónsson (1919–1984)	8 May 1965	14 July 1971	6 years, 2 months and 6 days (2,258 days)	IP	Jóhann Hafstein
20	Halldór E. Sigurðsson (1915–2003)	14 July 1971	28 August 1974	3 years, 1 month and 14 days (1,141 days)	PP	Ólafur Jóhannesson I
21	Matthías Árni Mathiesen (1931–2011)	28 August 1974	1 September 1978	4 years and 4 days (1,465 days)	IP	Geir Hallgrímsson
22	Tómas Árnason (1923–2014)	1 September 1978	15 October 1979	1 year, 1 month and 14 days (409 days)	PP	Ólafur Jóhannesson II
23	Sighvatur Björgvinsson (1942–)	15 October 1979	8 February 1980	3 months and 24 days (116 days)	SDP	Benedikt Sigurðsson Gröndal
24	Ragnar Arnalds (1938–2022)	8 February 1980	26 May 1983	3 years, 3 months and 18 days (1,203 days)	PA	Gunnar Thoroddsen
25	Albert Guðmundsson (1923–1994)	26 May 1983	16 October 1985	2 years, 4 months and 20 days (874 days)	IP	Steingrímur Hermannsson I
26	Þorsteinn Pálsson (1947–)	16 October 1985	8 July 1987	1 year, 8 months and 22 days (630 days)	IP	Steingrímur Hermannsson I
27	Jón Baldvin Hannibalsson (1939–)	8 July 1987	28 September 1988	1 year, 2 months and 20 days (448 days)	SDP	Þorsteinn Pálsson
28	Ólafur Ragnar Grímsson (1943–)	28 September 1988	30 April 1991	2 years, 7 months and 2 days (944 days)	PA	Steingrímur Hermannsson II
28	Ólafur Ragnar Grímsson (1943–)	28 September 1988	30 April 1991	2 years, 7 months and 2 days (944 days)	PA	Steingrímur Hermannsson III
29	Friðrik Sophusson (1943–)	30 April 1991	16 April 1998	6 years, 11 months and 17 days (2,543 days)	IP	Davíð Oddsson I
29	Friðrik Sophusson (1943–)	30 April 1991	16 April 1998	6 years, 11 months and 17 days (2,543 days)	IP	Davíð Oddsson II
30	Geir H. Haarde (1951–)	16 April 1998	27 September 2005	7 years, 5 months and 11 days (2,721 days)	IP	Davíð Oddsson II
30	Geir H. Haarde (1951–)	16 April 1998	27 September 2005	7 years, 5 months and 11 days (2,721 days)	IP	Davíð Oddsson III
30	Geir H. Haarde (1951–)	16 April 1998	27 September 2005	7 years, 5 months and 11 days (2,721 days)	IP	Davíð Oddsson IV
30	Geir H. Haarde (1951–)	16 April 1998	27 September 2005	7 years, 5 months and 11 days (2,721 days)	IP	Halldór Ásgrímsson
31	Árni M. Mathiesen (1958–)	27 September 2005	1 February 2009	3 years, 4 months and 5 days (1,223 days)	IP	Halldór Ásgrímsson
31	Árni M. Mathiesen (1958–)	27 September 2005	1 February 2009	3 years, 4 months and 5 days (1,223 days)	IP	Geir Haarde I
31	Árni M. Mathiesen (1958–)	27 September 2005	1 February 2009	3 years, 4 months and 5 days (1,223 days)	IP	Geir Haarde II
32	Steingrímur J. Sigfússon (1955–)	1 February 2009	31 December 2011	2 years, 10 months and 30 days (1,063 days)	LGM	Jóhanna Sigurðardóttir I
32	Steingrímur J. Sigfússon (1955–)	1 February 2009	31 December 2011	2 years, 10 months and 30 days (1,063 days)	LGM	Jóhanna Sigurðardóttir II
33	Oddný G. Harðardóttir (1957–)	31 December 2011	1 October 2012	9 months and 1 day (275 days)	SDA	Jóhanna Sigurðardóttir II
34	Katrín Júlíusdóttir (1974–)	1 October 2012	23 May 2013	7 months and 22 days (234 days)	SDA	Jóhanna Sigurðardóttir II
35	Bjarni Benediktsson (1970–)	23 May 2013	11 January 2017	3 years, 7 months and 19 days (1,329 days)	IP	Sigmundur Davíð Gunnlaugsson
35	Bjarni Benediktsson (1970–)	23 May 2013	11 January 2017	3 years, 7 months and 19 days (1,329 days)	IP	Sigurður Ingi Jóhannsson
36	Benedikt Jóhannesson (1955–)	11 January 2017	30 November 2017	10 months and 19 days (323 days)	RP	Bjarni Benediktsson
(35)	Bjarni Benediktsson (1970–)	30 November 2017	14 October 2023	5 years, 10 months and 14 days (2,144 days)	IP	Katrín Jakobsdóttir I
(35)	Bjarni Benediktsson (1970–)	30 November 2017	14 October 2023	5 years, 10 months and 14 days (2,144 days)	IP	Katrín Jakobsdóttir II
37	Þórdís Kolbrún R. Gylfadóttir (1987–)	14 October 2023	9 April 2024	5 months and 26 days (178 days)	IP	Katrín Jakobsdóttir II
38	Sigurður Ingi Jóhannsson (1962–)	9 April 2024	21 December 2024	8 months and 12 days (256 days)	PP	Bjarni Benediktsson II
39	Daði Már Kristófersson (1971–)	21 December 2024	Incumbent	1 year, 8 months and 15 days (623 days)	RP	Kristrún Frostadóttir
