= Eyjólfur Ármannsson =

Icelandic politician (born 1969)

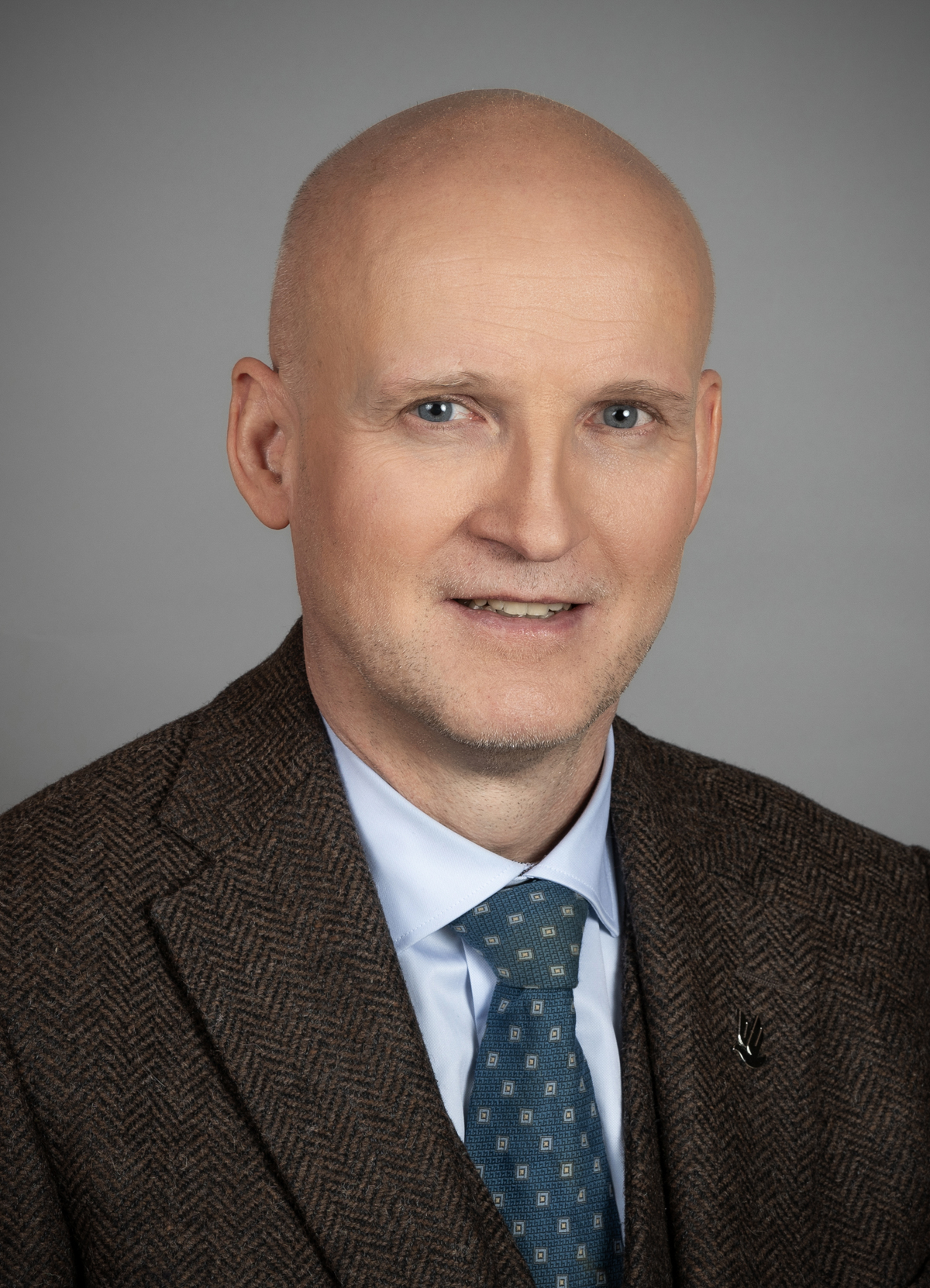
- Official portrait, 2025

Minister of Infrastructure
- Incumbent
- Assumed office 15 March 2025
- Prime Minister: Kristrún Frostadóttir
- Preceded by: Himself (as Minister of Transport and Local Government)

Minister of Transport and Local Government
- In office 21 December 2024 – 15 March 2025
- Preceded by: Sigurður Ingi Jóhannsson (Infrastructure)
- Succeeded by: Himself (as Minister of Infrastructure)

Member of the Althing
- Incumbent
- Assumed office 25 September 2021
- Constituency: Northwest

Personal details
- Born: 23 July 1969 (age 57) Vestmannaeyjar, Iceland
- Party: People's Party
- Education: University of Iceland; KU Leuven; University of Pennsylvania
- Occupation: Lawyer • Politician

Eyjólfur Ármannsson (born 23 July 1969) is an Icelandic politician and lawyer currently serving as Minister of Infrastructure since 15 March 2025, and formerly as Minister of Transport and Local Government from 21 December 2024 to 15 March 2025. He has been a member of the Althing since 2021, representing the People's Party.

== Career ==
Eyjólfur completed part of his secondary education in East Aurora, New York, before graduating from Menntaskólinn við Sund in Reykjavík. He earned a Master’s degree in Law from the University of Iceland in 1998, pursued postgraduate studies in European Law at KU Leuven, and obtained an LL.M. from the University of Pennsylvania. He holds district court attorney rights in Iceland and passed the securities brokerage exam in 2000.

His professional background includes work as Deputy District Commissioner, legal advisor in ministries and regulatory bodies, and Assistant Prosecutor for economic crimes at the National Commissioner of the Icelandic police. He worked internationally for DNB and Nordea banks in Oslo and later co-founded a Reykjavík-based law firm. He also served as legal advisor to Isavia.
