= First cabinet of Jón Magnússon =

1917 Icelandic cabinet

- 1st Cabinet of Iceland
- 1917–1920
- Date formed: 4 January 1917
- Date dissolved: 25 February 1920

People and organisations
- Head of state: Christian X of Denmark
- Head of government: Jón Magnússon
- Member parties: Home Rule Party; Independence Party þversum; Progressive Party

History
- Outgoing election: 1919 election
- Successor: Second cabinet of Jón Magnússon

The First cabinet of Jón Magnússon, nicknamed “The Sovereignty Government” (Icelandic: Fullveldisstjórnin), was formed 4 January 1917.

== Cabinets ==
=== Inaugural cabinet ===
Officeholder	Office
Jón Magnússon	Prime Minister
Jón Magnússon	Minister of Justice and Ecclesiastical Affairs
Björn Kristjánsson	Minister of Finance
Sigurður Jónsson	Minister of Employment

=== Change (28 August 1917) ===
Officeholder	Office
Jón Magnússon	Prime Minister
Jón Magnússon	Minister of Justice and Ecclesiastical Affairs
Sigurður Eggerz	Minister of Finance
Sigurður Jónsson	Minister of Employment
