= Tryggvi Þórhallsson =

Prime Minister of Iceland

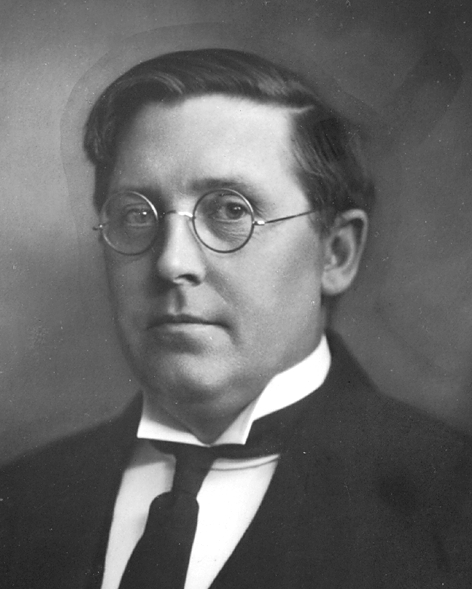

9th Prime Minister of Iceland
- In office 28 August 1927 – 3 June 1932
- Monarch: Christian X
- Preceded by: Jón Þorláksson
- Succeeded by: Ásgeir Ásgeirsson

Personal details
- Born: 9 February 1889 Reykjavík, Iceland
- Died: 31 July 1935 (aged 46) Reykjavík, Kingdom of Iceland
- Party: Progressive Party

Tryggvi Þórhallsson (9 February 1889 – 31 July 1935) was prime minister of Iceland from 28 August 1927 to 3 June 1932. He served as speaker of the Althing in 1933. He was a member of the Progressive Party. He was the Minister of Finance of Iceland from 1928 to 1929 and in 1931.

Tryggvi died on 31 July 1935 in a hospital in Reykjavík after battling an illness. His sister was Dóra Þórhallsdóttir.

Preceded by Jón Þorláksson	Prime Minister of Iceland; 1927–1932	Succeeded by Ásgeir Ásgeirsson
Preceded by Þorleifur Jónsson	Chairman of the Progressive Party; 1928–1932	Succeeded by Ásgeir Ásgeirsson
