= Magnús Guðmundsson =

Icelandic politician (1879–1937)

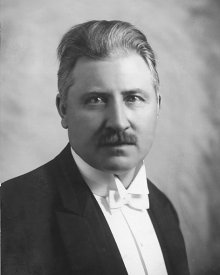

7th Prime Minister of Iceland
- In office 23 June 1926 – 8 July 1926
- Monarch: Christian X
- Preceded by: Jón Magnússon
- Succeeded by: Jón Þorláksson

Personal details
- Born: 6 February 1879; Svínadalur, Iceland
- Died: 28 November 1937 (aged 58); Reykjavík, Kingdom of Iceland
- Political party: Conservative Party
- Spouse: Sofia Bogadóttir

Magnús Guðmundsson (6 February 1879 – 28 November 1937) was an Icelandic politician. He graduated in laws from the University of Copenhagen in 1907. Magnus was a member of Althingi for his constituency in North west Iceland from 1916 till the day of his death in 1937. He served as prime minister of Iceland for 15 days, from 23 June to 8 July 1926 following the death of Jón Magnússon. Magnus is the shortest serving prime minister in Icelandic history. Magnus was a member of the now defunct Conservative Party (Íhaldsflokkurinn). He was the Minister of Industrial Affairs in the presiding Government of Jón Magnússon from 1924 to 1927. Prior to that he had served as Minister of Finance of Iceland from 1920 to 1922. He was a founding member of the Independence Party and served as a minister of Justice in the first government that the Independence Party participated in, from 1932 to 1934.

| Preceded by Jón Magnússon | Prime Minister of Iceland (acting); 1926 | Succeeded by Jón Þorláksson |
