= Jón Þorláksson =

Prime Minister of Iceland (1877–1935)

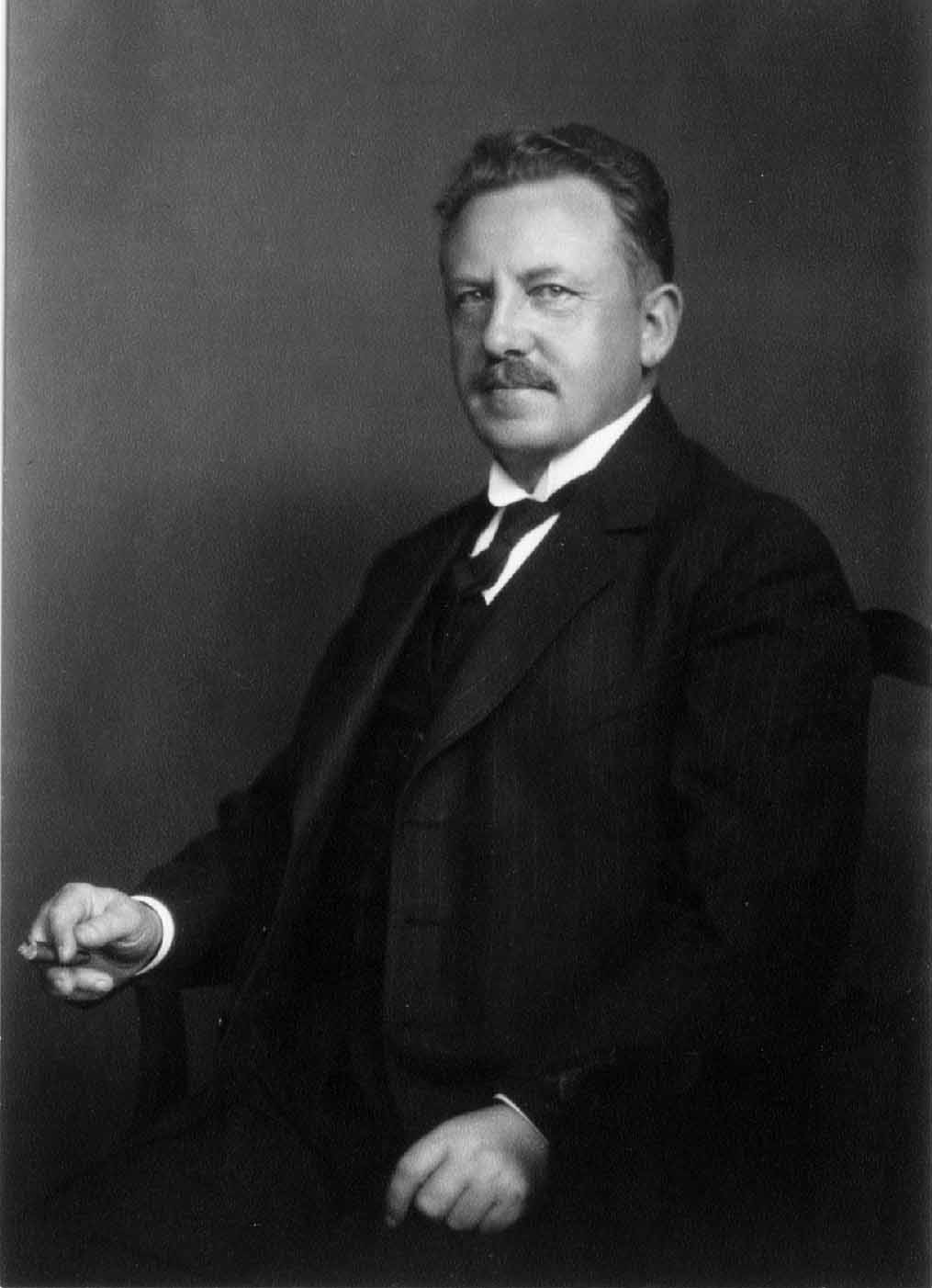

8th Prime Minister of Iceland
- In office 8 July 1926 – 28 August 1927
- Monarch: Christian X
- Preceded by: Magnús Guðmundsson
- Succeeded by: Tryggvi Þórhallsson

Personal details
- Born: 3 March 1877 Húnavatnssýsla, Iceland
- Died: 20 March 1935 (aged 58) Reykjavík, Kingdom of Iceland
- Party: Independence Party
- Children: 2

Jón Þorláksson (3 March 1877 – 20 March 1935) was prime minister of Iceland from 8 July 1926 to 28 August 1927. He was the only leader of the Conservative Party (Íhaldsflokkurinn) which merged with the Liberal Party to form the Independence Party in 1929, and the Mayor of Reykjavík from 1933 to his death.

== Career ==
Jón Þorláksson (usually transcribed Thorlaksson) was a farmer's son, from Vesturhópshólar in Húnavatnssýsla in the northwest of Iceland. He and his two sisters and one brother were unusually gifted. One of his sisters, Björg Þorláksdóttir, was for example the first Icelandic woman to receive a doctorate, from the Sorbonne in 1926. Jón Þorláksson graduated from Menntaskólinn í Reykjavík in 1897, highest in his class and with the best results ever given to a student at that school. He studied civil engineering at the Polytechnic College in Copenhagen (later the Danish Technical University), graduating in 1903. In 1905, he became Iceland's Chief Engineer, overseeing in the next 12 years the construction of roads and bridges in the country, and advocating (and helping to build) hydroelectric power plants and the use of Iceland's ample resources of thermal power to heat houses. Jón resigned from his office in 1917, starting a company which imported building materials, but also working as an independent engineer on several projects. He was elected to the parliament in 1921, on a list opposed to the nascent socialist party. Respected rather than popular, he soon became the leader of the conservative and libertarian elements in the parliament, founding in 1924 the Conservative Party. Jón Þorláksson became Minister of Finance of Iceland in the government formed by the Conservative Party in 1924, raising the value of the Icelandic crown in 1925, very much as Winston Churchill raised the value of the pound at the same time. Upon the sudden death of Prime Minister Jón Magnússon in 1926, he became Prime Minister as well. After the defeat of the Conservative Party in the parliamentary elections of 1927, Jón Þorláksson became the leader of the opposition. He was the first leader of the Independence Party which was formed by a merger of the Conservative Party and a small Liberal Party in 1929. He became Mayor of Reykjavík in December 1932. Because of failing health he resigned as leader of the Independence Party in 1934 and died one year later. He was married and had two adopted daughters.

== Political ideas ==
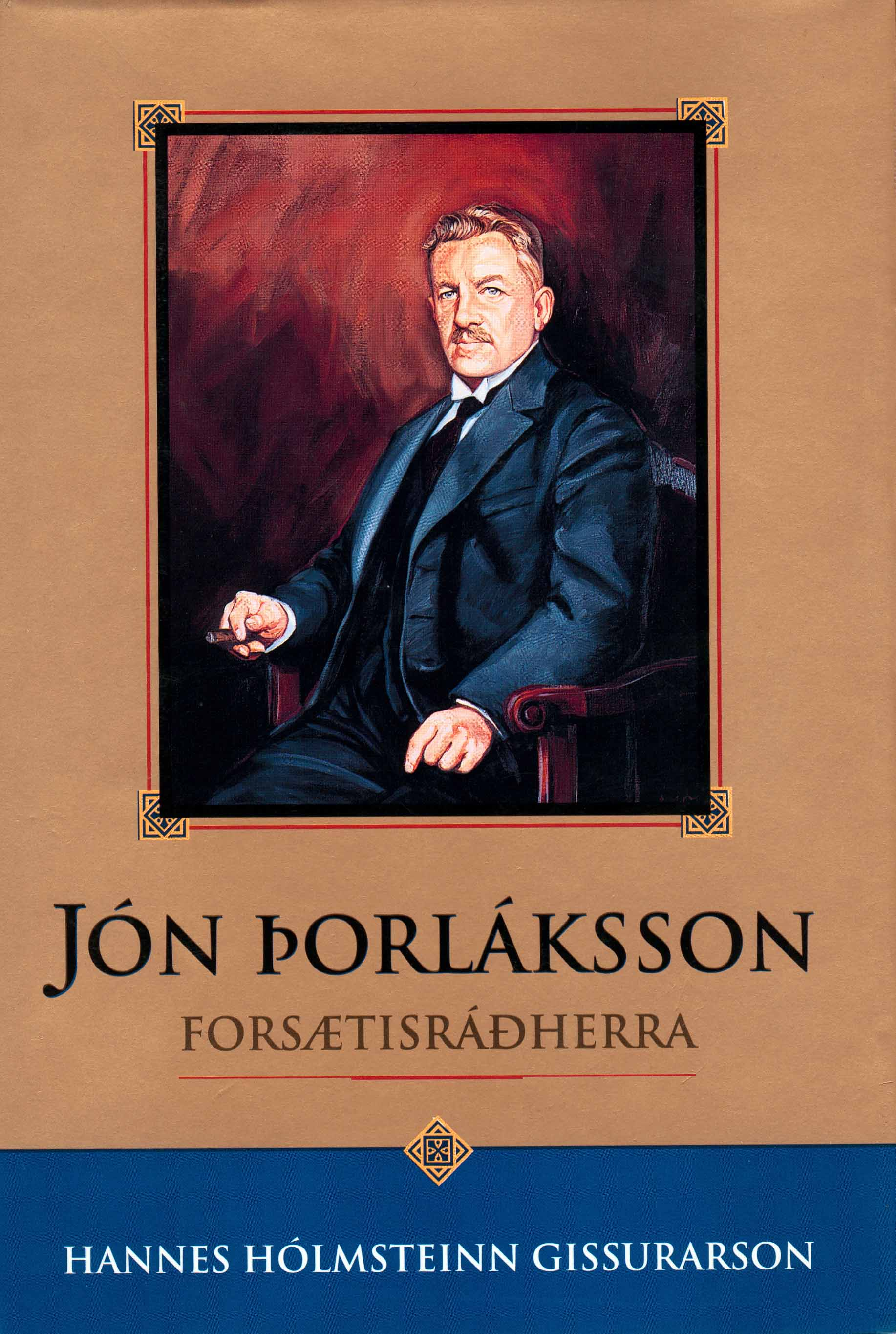
A biography of Jón Þorláksson (in Icelandic) was published in 1992

Jón Þorláksson was a classical liberal who had learnt his economics from the well-known Swedish economist Gustav Cassel. In a magazine article in 1926, Jón Þorláksson distinguished between conservative and radical ideas on the one hand and libertarian and authoritarian ideas on the other hand. He said that those two sets of ideas could exist in all four combinations. His opponents in the Icelandic left-wing or socialist parties were for example, he contended, both radical and authoritarian. Sometimes libertarians also had to be radical. But at present they should be conservative, because essentially their task was to conserve the freedom won in the battles of the 18th and 19th centuries, and to defend them against socialism. Thus, Jón Þorláksson defined himself as a conservative libertarian. In a paper read to the general meeting of the Conservative Party in 1929, he briefly, but clearly, outlined the classical liberal idea of how people could, by working solely for their own personal interest, in a competitive environment, unwittingly serve the public interest. There, he forcefully defended free trade and limited government. Publicly, Jón Þorláksson proposed the privatisation of the two commercial banks in Iceland, then in the hands of government.

Preceded by position established	Chairman of the Independence Party; 1929–1934	Succeeded by Ólafur Thors
Preceded by Magnús Guðmundsson (acting)	Prime Minister of Iceland; 1926–1927	Succeeded by Tryggvi Þórhallsson
