= List of members of the Althing, 2009–2013 =

This is a list of the 63 members of the Icelandic Parliament (Althing), from 2009 till 2013.

== Election results ==
National party	Chairperson(s)	Seats	± 2007
Social Democratic Alliance	Jóhanna Sigurðardóttir	20 / 63	▲2
Independence Party	Bjarni Benediktsson	16 / 63	▼9
Left-Green Movement	Steingrímur Sigfússon	14 / 63	▲5
Progressive Party	Sigmundur Gunnlaugsson	9 / 63	▼2
Citizens' Movement	no designated chairperson(s)	4 / 63	—

Evolution of seat composition:

National party	2009 election	1 January 2010	1 January 2011	1 January 2012	1 January 2013	2013 election
Social Democratic Alliance	20 / 63	20 / 63	20 / 63	20 / 63	19 / 63	19 / 63
Independence Party	16 / 63	16 / 63	16 / 63	16 / 63	16 / 63	16 / 63
Left-Green Movement	14 / 63	15 / 63	15 / 63	12 / 63	12 / 63	11 / 63
Progressive Party	9 / 63	9 / 63	9 / 63	9 / 63	9 / 63	9 / 63
Citizens' Movement	4 / 63	—	—	—	—	—
The Movement	—	3 / 63	3 / 63	3 / 63	Merged with Liberal Party into Dawn.	
Solidarity	—	—	—	1 / 63	1 / 63	1 / 63
Dawn	—	—	—	—	2 / 63	2 / 63
Bright Future	—	—	—	1 / 63	2 / 63	2 / 63
Pirate Party	—	—	—	—	1 / 63	1 / 63
Independent	0 / 63	0 / 63	0 / 63	1 / 63	1 / 63	2 / 63

== List of chosen MPs ==
Name	National party	Constituency	# of votes
Atli Gíslason	Left-Green Movement	South	
Birgir Ármannsson	Independence Party	Reykjavik South	
Birgitta Jónsdóttir	Citizens' Movement	Reykjavik South	
Birkir Jónsson	Progressive Party	Northeast	
Bjarni Benediktsson	Independence Party	Southwest	
Björgvin Sigurðsson	Social Democratic Alliance	South	
Björn Gíslason	Left-Green Movement	Northeast	
Einar Guðfinnsson	Independence Party	Northwest	
Eygló Harðardóttir	Progressive Party	South	
Gunnar Sveinsson	Progressive Party	Northwest	
Guðbjartur Hannesson	Social Democratic Alliance	Northwest	
Guðfríður Grétarsdóttir	Left-Green Movement	Southwest	
Guðlaugur Þórðarson	Independence Party	Reykjavik South	
Guðmundur Steingrímsson	Progressive Party	Northwest	
Helgi Hjörvar	Social Democratic Alliance	Reykjavik North	
Höskuldur Þórhallsson	Progressive Party	Northeast	
Illugi Gunnarsson	Independence Party	Reykjavik North	
Jóhanna Sigurðardóttir	Social Democratic Alliance	Reykjavik North	
Jón Bjarnason	Left-Green Movement	Northwest	
Jón Gunnarsson	Independence Party	Southwest	
Jónína Guðmundsdóttir	Social Democratic Alliance	Northeast	
Katrín Jakobsdóttir	Left-Green Movement	Reykjavik North	
Katrín Júlíusdóttir	Social Democratic Alliance	Southwest	
Kristján Júlíusson	Independence Party	Northeast	
Kristján Möller	Social Democratic Alliance	Northeast	
Lilja Magnúsdóttir	Left-Green Movement	Northwest	
Lilja Mósesdóttir	Left-Green Movement	Reykjavik South	
Magnús Schram	Social Democratic Alliance	Southwest	
Margrét Tryggvadóttir	Citizens' Movement	South	
Oddný Harðardóttir	Social Democratic Alliance	South	
Pétur Blöndal	Independence Party	Reykjavik North	
Ragnheiður Árnadóttir	Independence Party	South	
Ragnheiður Ríkharðsdóttir	Independence Party	Southwest	
Róbert Marshall	Social Democratic Alliance	South	
Sigmundur Gunnlaugsson	Progressive Party	Reykjavik North	
Sigmundur Rúnarsson	Social Democratic Alliance	Northeast	
Sigríður Ingadóttir	Social Democratic Alliance	Reykjavik South	
Sigurður Jóhannsson	Progressive Party	South	
Siv Friðleifsdóttir	Progressive Party	Southwest	
Skúli Helgason	Social Democratic Alliance	Reykjavik South	
Steingrímur Sigfússon	Left-Green Movement	Northeast	
Steinunn Óskarsdóttir (Note: Resigned in 2010. Replaced by Mörður Árnason.)	Social Democratic Alliance	Reykjavik North	
Svandís Svavarsdóttir	Left-Green Movement	Reykjavik South	
Tryggvi Herbertsson	Independence Party	Northeast	
Unnur Konráðsdóttir	Independence Party	South	
Valgerður Bjarnadóttir	Social Democratic Alliance	Reykjavik North	
Vigdís Hauksdóttir	Progressive Party	Reykjavik South	
Álfheiður Ingadóttir	Left-Green Movement	Reykjavik North	
Árni Árnason	Social Democratic Alliance	Southwest	
Árni Johnsen	Independence Party	South	
Árni Sigurðsson	Left-Green Movement	Reykjavik North	
Ásbjörn Óttarsson	Independence Party	Northwest	
Ásmundur Daðason	Left-Green Movement	Northwest	
Ásta Jóhannesdóttir	Social Democratic Alliance	Reykjavik South	
Ólína Þorvarðardóttir	Social Democratic Alliance	Northwest	
Ólöf Nordal	Independence Party	Reykjavik South	
Ögmundur Jónasson	Left-Green Movement	Southwest	
Össur Skarphéðinsson	Social Democratic Alliance	Reykjavik South	
Þorgerður Gunnarsdóttir	Independence Party	Reykjavik South	
Þráinn Bertelsson	Citizens' Movement	Reykjavik North	
Þuríður Backman	Left-Green Movement	Northeast	
Þór Saari	Citizens' Movement	Southwest	
Þórunn Sveinbjarnardóttir (Note: Resigned in 2011. Replaced by Lúðvík Geirsson.)	Social Democratic Alliance	Southwest	

== Changes during the legislation ==
=== Members who changed parties ===
Name	Date	Old party	New party
Þráinn Bertelsson	14 August 2009	Citizen's Movement → Movement → Dawn	Left-Green Movement
Atli Gíslason	21 March 2011	Left-Green Movement	Independent
Lilja Mósesdóttir	21 March 2011	Left-Green Movement	Solidarity
Ásmundur Daðason	1 June 2011	Left-Green Movement	Progressive Party
Guðmundur Steingrímsson	22 August 2011	Progressive Party	Bright Future
Róbert Marshall	12 October 2012	Social Democratic Alliance	Bright Future
Birgitta Jónsdóttir	2012	Citizen's Movement → Movement → Dawn	Pirate Party
Jón Bjarnason	24 January 2013	Left-Green Movement	Independent
