= List of Eurosceptic political parties =

This is a list of Eurosceptic political parties in Europe. This list includes both active and defunct political parties, as well as both soft and hard Eurosceptic parties.

== By country ==
=== Armenia ===
Name	Native name(s)	Reference(s)
Adequate Party	Armenian: Ադեկվադ, romanized: Adekvad	
Constitutional Rights Union	Armenian: Սահմանադրական իրավունքների միություն, romanized: Sahmanadrakan iravunk'neri miut'yun	
Hayazn	Armenian: Հայազն	
Prosperous Armenia Party	Armenian: Բարգավաճ Հայաստան կուսակցություն, romanized: Bargavatch Hayastan kusaktsut'yun	
United Communist Party of Armenia	Armenian: Հայաստանի Միավորված Կոմունիստական Կուսակցության, romanized: Hayastani Miatsial Komunistakan Kusaktsutyun	

=== Austria ===
Name	Native name(s)	Reference(s)
Alliance for the Future of Austria	Bündnis Zukunft Österreich	
EU Exit Party for Austria	German: EU-Austrittspartei für Österreich	
Free Party Salzburg	German: Freie Partei Salzburg	
Freedom Party of Austria	German: Freiheitliche Partei Österreichs	
International Socialist Alternative	German: Internationale Sozialistische Alternative	
KPÖ Plus		
Party of Labour of Austria	German: Partei der Arbeit Österreichs	
Team HC Strache – Alliance for Austria	German: Team HC Strache – Allianz für Österreich	
Team Stronach for Austria	German: Team Stronach für Österreich	
The Reform Conservatives	German: Die Reformkonservativen	

=== Azerbaijan ===
Name	Native name(s)	Reference(s)
New Azerbaijan Party	Azerbaijani: Yeni Azərbaycan Partiyası	

=== Belarus ===
Name	Native name(s)	Reference(s)
Belarusian Agrarian Party	Russian: Белорусская аграрная партия, romanized: Belorusskaya grarnaya partiya, Belarusian: Беларуская аграрная партыя, romanized: Bielaruskaja ahrarnaja partyja	

=== Belgium ===
Name	Native name(s)	Reference(s)
Flemish Interest	Dutch: Vlaams Belang	
Liberal Democrats	French: Libéraux Démocrates	
Libertarian, Direct, Democratic	Dutch: Libertair, Direct, Democratisch	
Nation		
People's Party	Dutch: Volkspartij, French: Parti Populaire	
Vivant		
Workers' Party of Belgium	Dutch: Partij van de Arbeid van België, French: Parti du Travail de Belgique	

=== Bosnia and Herzegovina ===
Name	Native name(s)	Reference(s)
Bosnian Movement of National Pride	Bosnian: Bosanski Pokret Nacionalnog Ponosa	
Socialist Party	Serbo-Croatian: Социјалистичка Партија, Socijalistička Partija	

=== Bulgaria ===
Name	Native name(s)	Reference(s)
Attack	Bulgarian: Атака, romanized: Ataka	
Bulgarian Patriots	Bulgarian: Българските патриоти, romanized: Bŭlgarskite patrioti	
Bulgarian Rise	Bulgarian: Български възход, romanized: Balgarski vazhod	
IMRO – Bulgarian National Movement	Bulgarian: ВМРО – Българско Национално Движение	
National Front for the Salvation of Bulgaria	Bulgarian: Национален фронт за спасение на България, romanized: Natsionalen front za spasenie na Bŭlgariya	
Party of the Bulgarian Communists	Bulgarian: Партия на Българските комунисти, romanized: Partiya na Bulgarskite komunisti	
Patriotic Front	Bulgarian: Патриотичен фронт	
People for Real, Open and United Democracy	Bulgarian: Гражданско обединение за реална демокрация	
Revival	Bulgarian: Възраждане	
Union of Communists in Bulgaria	Bulgarian: Съюз на комунистите в България, romanized: Sayuz na komunistite v Balgariya	

=== Croatia ===
Name	Native name(s)	Reference(s)
Bloc for Croatia	Croatian: Blok za Hrvatsku	
Croatian Liberation Movement	Croatian: Hrvatski Oslobodilački Pokret	
Croatian Party of Rights — Dr. Ante Starčević	Croatian: Hrvatska Stranka Prava — Dr. Ante Starčević	
Croatian Sovereignists	Croatian: Hrvatski Suverenisti	
Homeland Movement	Croatian: Domovinski Pokret	
Red Action	Croatian: Crvena Akcija	
Law and Justice	Croatian: Pravo i Pravda	

=== Czech Republic ===
Name	Native name(s)	Reference(s)
ANO 2011	Czech: ANO 2011	
Civic Democratic Party	Czech: Občanská Demokratická Strana	
Communist Party of Bohemia and Moravia	Czech: Komunistická Strana Čech a Moravy	
Conservative Party	Czech: Konzervativní Strana	
Czech National Social Party	Czech: Česká Strana Národně Sociální	
Czech Sovereignty of Social Democracy	Czech: Česká Suverenita Sociální Demokracie	
Freedom and Direct Democracy	Czech: Svoboda a Přímá Demokracie	
Freeholder Party of the Czech Republic	Czech: Strana Soukromníků České Republiky	
PRO Law Respect Expertise	Czech: PRO Právo Respekt Odbornost	
Motorists for Themselves	Czech: Motoristé Sobě	
National Democracy	Czech: Národní Demokracie	
Oath	Czech: Přísaha	
Rally for the Republic – Republican Party of Czechoslovakia	Czech: Sdružení pro Republiku – Republikánská Strana Československa	
United Democrats – Association of Independents	Czech: Spojení demokraté – Sdružení nezávislých	
Svobodní	Czech: Svobodní	
Tricolour	Czech: Trikolora	

=== Denmark ===
Name	Native name(s)	Reference(s)
Common Course	Danish: Fælles Kurs	
Danish People's Party	Danish: Dansk Folkeparti	
Danish Unity	Danish: Dansk Samling	
Democratic Party	Det Demokratiske Parti	
Denmark Democrats	Danish: Danmarksdemokraterne	
Freedom Party	Danish: Frihedspartiet	
June Movement	Danish: JuniBevægelsen	
Justice Party of Denmark	Danish: Retsforbundet	
New Right	Danish: Nye Borgerlige	
Party of the Danes	Danish: Danskernes Parti	
People's Movement against the EU	Danish: Folkebevægelsen mod EU	
Red-Green Alliance	Danish: Enhedslisten – De Rød-Grønne	

=== Estonia ===
Name	Native name(s)	Reference(s)
Conservative People's Party of Estonia	Estonian: Eesti Konservatiivne Rahvaerakond	
Estonian Centre Party	Estonian: Eesti Keskerakond	
Estonian Independence Party	Estonian: Eesti Iseseisvuspartei	
Party of Estonian Christian Democrats	Estonian: Erakond Eesti Kristlikud Demokraadid	

=== Faroe Islands ===
Name	Native name(s)	Reference(s)
People's Party	Faroese: Fólkaflokkurin, Danish: Folkeparti	

=== Finland ===
Name	Native name(s)	Reference(s)
Blue and White Front	Finnish: Sinivalkoinen Rintama	
Finnish People First	Finnish: Suomen Kansa Ensin	
Foundational Finns	Finnish: Perussuomalaiset, Swedish: Sannfinländarna	
Forces for Change in Finland	Finnish: Muutosvoimat Suomi, Swedish: Förändringskrafterna i Finland	
Freedom Alliance	Finnish: Vapauden Liitto, Swedish: Frihetsalliansen	
Independence Party	Finnish: Itsenäisyyspuolue, Swedish: Självständighetspartiet	
Non-aligned Coalition	Swedish: Obunden Samling	
Power Belongs to the People	Finnish: Valta Kuuluu Kansalle, Swedish: Makten Tillhör Folket	

=== France ===
Name	Native name(s)	Reference(s)
Debout la France (France Arise)		
Citizen and Republican Movement	French: Mouvement Républicain et Citoyen	
Communist Revolutionary Party of France	French: Parti Communiste Révolutionnaire de France	
French Future	French: L'Avenir Français	
La France Insoumise (France Unbowed)		
Left Front	French: Front de Gauche	
Left Party	French: Parti de Gauche	
National Rally	French: Rassemblement National	
New Anticapitalist Party	French: Nouveau Parti Anticapitaliste	
Pole of Communist Revival in France	French: Pôle de Renaissance Communiste en France	
Popular Republican Union	French: Union Populaire Républicain	
Rally for France	French: Rassemblement pour la France	
Reconquête (Reconquest)		
Rurality Movement	French: Le Mouvement de la Ruralité	
Social Bastion	French: Bastion Social	
The Patriots	French: Les Patriotes	

=== Georgia ===
Name	Native name(s)	Reference(s)
Alliance of Patriots of Georgia	Georgian: საქართველოს პატრიოტთა ალიანსი, romanized: sakartvelos p'at'riot'ta aliansi	
Conservatives for Georgia	Georgian: კონსერვატორები საქართველოსთვის, romanized: k'onservat'orebi sakartvelostvis	
European Socialists	Georgian: ევროპელი სოციალისტები, romanized: evrop'eli sotsialist'ebi	
Georgian Dream	Georgian: ქართული ოცნება, romanized: kartuli otsneba	
Industry Will Save Georgia	Georgian: მრეწველობა გადაარჩენს საქართველოს, romanized: mrets'veloba gadaarchens sakartvelos	
People's Power	Georgian: ხალხის ძალა, romanized: khalkhis dzala	

=== Germany ===
Name	Native name(s)	Reference(s)
Alternative for Germany	German: Alternative für Deutschland	
Bavaria Party	German: Bayernpartei	
Bündnis Sahra Wagenknecht (Alliance Sahra Wagenknecht)		
Freedom – Civil Rights Party for More Freedom and Democracy	German: Die Freiheit – Bürgerrechtspartei für mehr Freiheit und Demokratie	
Liberal Conservative Reformers	German: Liberal-Konservative Reformer	
National Democratic Party of Germany	German: Nationaldemokratische Partei Deutschlands	
The Blue Party	German: Die Blaue Partei	
The German Conservatives	German: Die Deutschen Konservativen	
The Republicans	German: Die Republikaner	
The Right	German: Die Rechte	

=== Greece ===
Name	Native name(s)	Reference(s)
Antarsya	Greek: Ανταρσύα	
Communist Party of Greece	Greek: Κομμουνιστικό Κόμμα Ελλάδας, romanized: Kommounistikó Kómma Elládas	
Course of Freedom	Greek: Πλεύση Ελευθερίας, romanized: Plefsi Eleftherias	
Democratic Social Movement	Greek: Δημοκρατικό Κοινωνικό Κίνημα, romanized: Dimokratiko Koinoniko Kinima	
Drachmi Greek Democratic Movement Five Stars	Greek: ΔΡΑΧΜΗ Ελληνική Δημοκρατικό Κίνηση Πέντε Αστέρια	
Free People	Greek: Ελεύθεροι Άνθρωποι	
Popular Association – Golden Dawn	Greek: Λαϊκός Σύνδεσμος – Χρυσή Αυγή, romanized: Laïkós Sýndesmos – Chrysí Avgí	
Greeks for the Fatherland	Greek: Έλληνες για την Πατρίδα, romanized: Éllines gia tin Patrída	
National Popular Consciousness	Greek: Εθνική Λαϊκή Συνείδηση, romanized: Ethnikí Laïkí Syneídisi	
New Right	Greek: Νέα Δεξιά, romanized: Nea Dexia	
People's Resistance	Greek: Λαϊκή Αντίσταση, romanized: Laiki Antistasi	
Popular Greek Patriotic Union	Greek: Λαϊκή Ελληνική Πατριωτική Ένωση, romanized: Laiki Elliniki Patriotiki Enosi	
Popular Orthodox Rally	Greek: Λαϊκός Ορθόδοξος Συναγερμός, romanized: Laikós Orthódoxos Synagermós	
Popular Unity	Greek: Λαϊκή Ενότητα, romanized: Laïkí Enótita	

=== Hungary ===
Name	Native name(s)	Reference(s)
Fidesz		
Hungarian Workers' Party	Hungarian: Magyar Munkáspárt	
Our Homeland Movement	Hungarian: Mi Hazánk Mozgalom	

=== Iceland ===
Name	Native name(s)	Reference(s)
Centre Party	Icelandic: Miðflokkurinn	
Freedom Party	Icelandic: Frelsisflokkurinn	
Icelandic National Front	Icelandic: Íslenska Þjóðfylkingin	
Independence Party	Icelandic: Sjálfstæðisflokkurinn	
Left-Green Movement	Icelandic: Vinstrihreyfingin – Grænt Framboð	
Liberal Democratic Party	Icelandic: Frjálslyndi lýðræðisflokkurinn	
Liberal Party	Icelandic: Frjálslyndi Flokkurinn	
People's Front of Iceland	Icelandic: Alþýðufylkingin	
People's Party	Icelandic: Flokkur Fólksins	
Progressive Party	Icelandic: Framsóknarflokkurinn	
Rainbow	Icelandic: Regnboginn	
Right-Green People's Party	Icelandic: Hægri Grænir Flokkur Fólksins	
Sovereign Union	Icelandic: Samtök Fullveldissinna	

=== Ireland ===
Name	Native name(s)	Reference(s)
Aontú (Unity)		
Catholic Democrats	Irish: Daonlathaithe Caitliceacha	
Direct Democracy Ireland	Irish: Daonlathas Díreach Éireann	
Éirígí		
Identity Ireland	Irish: Aitheantas Éire	
Immigration Control Platform	Irish: An Feachtas um Smacht ar Inimirce	
Irish Freedom Party	Irish: Cumann na Saoirse	
Libertas Ireland		
Militant Left		
National Party	Irish: An Páirtí Náisiúnta	
Renua		
Saoradh (Liberation)		
Socialist Party	Irish: Páirtí Sóisialach	

=== Italy ===
Name	Native name(s)	Reference(s)
Alternativa (Alternative)		
Brothers of Italy	Italian: Fratelli d'Italia	
Communist Party	Italian: Partito Comunista	
Conservatives and Reformists	Italian: Conservatori e Riformisti	
Direction Italy	Italian: Direzione Italia	
Fatherland and Constitution	Italian: Patria e Costituzione	
I Love Italy	Italian: Io Amo l'Italia	
Italexit		
Italian Communist Party	Italian: Partito Comunista Italiano	
Lega (League)		
Lega Nord (Northern League)		
National Movement for Sovereignty	Italian: Movimento Nazionale per la Sovranità	
National Front	Italian: Fronte Nazionale	
Network of Communists	Italian: Rete dei Comunisti	
New Force	Italian: Forza Nuova	
No Euro Movement	Italian: Movimento No Euro	
Popular Unity	Italian: Unità Popolare	
Power to the People	Italian: Potere al Popolo	
Risorgimento Socialista (Socialist Resurgence)		
Social Idea Movement	Italian: Movimento Idea Sociale	
Sovereign Popular Democracy	Italian: Democrazia Sovrana Popolare	
Sovereignty	Italian: Sovranità	
The Right	Italian: La Destra	
Tricolour Flame	Italian: Fiamma Tricolore	
Us with Salvini	Italian: Noi con Salvini	

=== Kazakhstan ===
Name	Native name(s)	Reference(s)
Amanat (Trust)	Kazakh: Аманат	

=== Latvia ===
Name	Native name(s)	Reference(s)
Action Party	Latvian: Rīcības Partija	
All for Latvia!	Latvian: Visu Latvijai!	
For a Humane Latvia	Latvian: Par Cilvēcīgu Latviju	
For Each and Every One	Latvian: Katram un Katrai	
For Fatherland and Freedom/LNNK	Latvian: Tēvzemei un Brīvībai/LNNK	
Latvia First	Latvian: Latvija Pirmajā Vietā	
Union of Greens and Farmers	Latvian: Latvija Pirmajā Vietā	

=== Lithuania ===
Name	Native name(s)	Reference(s)
Lithuanian People's Party	Lithuanian: Lietuvos Liaudies Partija	
Order and Justice	Lithuanian: Tvarka ir Teisingumas	
People and Justice Union	Lithuanian: Tautos ir Teisingumo Sąjunga	

=== Luxembourg ===
Name	Native name(s)	Reference(s)
Alternative Democratic Reform Party	Luxembourgish: Alternativ Demokratesch Reformpartei, French: Parti Réformiste d'Alternative Démocratique, German: Alternative Demokratische Reformpartei	
Communist Party of Luxembourg	Luxembourgish: Kommunistesch Partei vu Lëtzebuerg, French: Parti Communiste Luxembourgeois, German: Kommunistische Partei Luxemburgs	
The Left	Luxembourgish: Déi Lénk, French: La Gauche, German: Die Linken	

=== Malta ===
Name	Native name(s)	Reference(s)
ABBA		
Alliance for Change	Maltese: Alleanza Bidla	
Communist Party of Malta	Maltese: Partit Komunista Malti	
Libertas Malta		
National Action	Maltese: Azzjoni Nazzjonali	
People's Party	Maltese: Partit Popolari	

=== Moldova ===
Name	Native name(s)	Reference(s)
Collective Action Party – Civic Congress	Romanian: Partidul Acțiunii Comune – Congresul Civic	
Our Party	Romanian: Partidul Nostru	
Party of Communists of the Republic of Moldova	Romanian: Partidul Comuniștilor din Republica Moldova	
Party of Socialists of the Republic of Moldova	Romanian: Partidul Socialiștilor din Republica Moldova, Russian: Партия социалистов Республики Молдова, romanized: Partya sotsialistov Respubliki Moldova	
Victory	Romanian: Victorie	

=== Montenegro ===
Name	Native name(s)	Reference(s)
Democratic Front	Montenegrin: Демократски фронт, romanized: Demokratski front	
Democratic People's Party	Montenegrin: Демократска народна партија, romanized: Demokratska narodna partija	
Party of Serb Radicals	Serbian: Странка српских радикала, romanized: Stranka srpskih radikala	
Serb List	Serbian: Српска листа, romanized: Srpska lista	

=== Netherlands ===
Name	Native name(s)	Reference(s)
50PLUS		
Article 50	Dutch: Artikel 50	
Centre Democrats	Dutch: Centrum Democraten	
Centre Party	Dutch: Centrumpartij	
Christian Union	Dutch: ChristenUnie	
Christian Union – Reformed Political Party	Dutch: ChristenUnie – Staatkundig Gereformeerde Partij	
Democratic Political Turning Point	Dutch: Democratisch Politiek Keerpunt	
Forum for Democracy	Dutch: Forum voor Democratie	
Forza! Netherlands	Dutch: Forza! Nederland	
Independent Citizen's Party	Dutch: Onafhankelijke Burger Partij	
Interest of the Netherlands	Dutch: Belang van Nederland	
JA21		
Jesus Lives	Dutch: Jezus Leeft	
Otten Group	Dutch: Groep Otten	
Party for Freedom	Dutch: Partij voor de Vrijheid	
Party for Neighbourly Love, Freedom and Diversity	Dutch: Partij voor Naastenliefde, Vrijheid en Diversiteit	
Pim Fortuyn List	Dutch: Lijst Pim Fortuyn	
Reformed Political Party	Dutch: Staatkundig Gereformeerde Partij	
Socialist Party	Dutch: Socialistische Partij	
Proud of the Netherlands	Dutch: Trots op Nederland	
VoorNederland (For Netherlands)		

=== North Macedonia ===
Name	Native name(s)	Reference(s)
The Left	Macedonian: Левица, romanized: Levica	
United Macedonia	Macedonian: Единствена Македонија, romanized: Edinstvena Makedonija	

=== Norway ===
Name	Native name(s)	Reference(s)
Capitalist Party	Bokmål: Liberalistene, Nynorsk: Liberalistane	
Centre Party	Norwegian: Senterpartiet, Northern Sami: Guovddášbellodat	
Christian Democratic Party	Bokmål: Kristelig Folkeparti, Nynorsk: Kristeleg Folkeparti, Northern Sami: Risttalaš Álbmotbellodat	
Democrats in Norway	Bokmål: Demokratene, Nynorsk: Demokratane	
Progress Party	Bokmål: Fremskrittspartiet, Nynorsk: Framstegspartiet, Northern Sami: Ovddádusbellodat	
Red Party	Bokmål: Rødt, Nynorsk: Raudt, Northern Sami: Ruoksat	
Socialist Left Party	Norwegian: Sosialistisk Venstreparti, Northern Sami: Sosialisttalaš Gurutbellodat	
Society Party	Norwegian: Samfunnspartiet	

=== Poland ===
Name	Native name(s(	Reference(s)
Alliance for Poland	Polish: Przymierze dla Polski	
Confederation Liberty and Independence	Polish: Konfederacja Wolność i Niepodległość	
Confederation of the Polish Crown	Polish: Konfederacja Korony Polskiej	
Congress of the New Right	Polish: Kongres Nowej Prawicy	
Forward Poland	Polish: Naprzód Polsko	
Libertas Poland	Polish: Libertas Polska	
New Hope	Polish: Nowa Nadzieja	
National League	Polish: Liga Narodowa	
National Movement	Polish: Ruch Narodowy	
National Revival	Polish: Stronnictwo Narodowe	
National Revival of Poland	Polish: Narodowe Odrodzenie Polski	
Party of Regions	Polish: Partia Regionów	
Poland Comes First	Polish: Polska jest Najważniejsza	
Poland Together	Polish: Polska Razem	
Real Politics Union	Polish: Unia Polityki Realnej	
Right Wing of the Republic	Polish: Prawica Rzeczypospolitej	
Union of Christian Families	Polish: Zjednoczenie Chrześcijańskich Rodzin	

=== Portugal ===
Name	Native name(s)	Reference(s)
CDS – People's Party	Portuguese: CDS – Partido Popular	
Chega (Enough)		
Left Bloc	Portuguese: Bloco de Esquerda	
National Democratic Alternative	Portuguese: Alternativa Democrática Nacional	
New Democracy Party	Portuguese: Partido da Nova Democracia	
People's Monarchist Party	Portuguese: Partido Popular Monárquico	
Portuguese Communist Party	Portuguese: Partido Comunista Português	
Rise Up	Portuguese: Ergue-te	

=== Romania ===
Name	Native name(s)	Reference(s)
Alliance for the Union of Romanians	Romanian: Alianța pentru Unirea Românilor	
Ecologist Party of Romania	Romanian: Partidul Ecologist Român	
Greater Romania Party	Romanian: Partidul România Mare	
National Identity Bloc in Europe	Romanian: Blocul Identităţii Naţionale în Europa	
Romanian Nationhood Party	Romanian: Partidul Neamul Românesc	
S.O.S. Romania	Romanian: S.O.S. România	
The Right Alternative	Romanian: Alternativa Dreaptă	
United Romania Party	Romanian: Partidul România Unită	

=== Russia ===
Name	Native name(s)	Reference(s)
Communist Party of the Russian Federation	Russian: Коммунистическая Партия Российской Федерации, romanized: Kommunisticheskaya Partiya Rossiyskoy Federatsii	
For Truth	Russian: За правду, romanized: Za pravdu	
Liberal Democratic Party of Russia	Russian: Либерально-демократическая партия России, romanized: Liberal'no-demokraticheskaya partiya Rossii	
National Patriotic Forces of Russia	Russian: Национально-патриотические силы России, romanized: Natsionalʹno-patrioticheskiye sily Rossii	
Socialist Alternative	Russian: Социалистическая альтернатива, romanized: Sotsialisticheskaya alternativa	
United Russia	Russian: Единая Россия, romanized: Yedinaya Rossiya	

=== Serbia ===
Name	Native name(s)	Reference(s)
Coalition of Refugee Associations in the Republic of Serbia	Serbian: Коалиција удружења избјеглица у Републици Србији, romanized: Koalicija Udruženja Izbjeglica u Republici Srbiji	
Dveri (Doors)	Serbian: Двери	
Enough is Enough	Serbian: Доста је било, romanized: Dosta je bilo	
Healthy Serbia	Serbian: Здрава Србија, romanized: Zdrava Srbija	
Liberation Movement	Serbian: Покрет ослобођење, romanized: Pokret oslobođenje	
Love, Faith, Hope	Serbian: Љував, вера, нада, romanized: Ljvav, vera, nada	
Movement for the Restoration of the Kingdom of Serbia	Serbian: Покрет обнове Краљевине Србије, romanized: Pokret obnove Kraljevine Srbije	
Movement of Socialists	Serbian: Покрет социјалиста, romanized: Pokret socijalista	
National Democratic Alternative	Serbian: Национално демократска алтернатива, romanized: Nacionalno demokratska alternativa	
National Network	Serbian: Народна мрежа, romanized: Narodna mreža	
New Democratic Party of Serbia	Serbian: Нова демократска странка Србије, romanized: Nova demokratska stranka Srbije	
Russian Party	Serbian: Руска странка, romanized: Ruska stranka, Russian: Русская партия, romanized: Russkaya partiya	
Serbian People's Party	Serbian: Српска народна партија, romanized: Srpska narodna partija	
Serbian Radical Party	Serbian: Српска радикална странка, romanized: Srpska radikalna stranka	
Sovereignists	Serbian: Суверенисти, romanized: Suverenisti	

=== Slovakia ===
Name	Native name(s)	Reference(s)
Slovak National Party	Slovak: Slovenská Národná Strana	
Republic	Slovak: Republika	
People's Party Our Slovakia	Slovak: Ľudová Strana Naše Slovensko	
Slovak PATRIOT	Slovak: Slovenský PATRIOT	
We Are Family	Slovak: Sme Rodina	
Freedom and Solidarity	Slovak: Sloboda a Solidarita	

=== Slovenia ===
Name	Native name(s)	Reference(s)
Initiative for Democratic Socialism	Slovene: Iniciativa za Demokratični Socializem	
Party of Slovenian People	Slovene: Stranka Slovenskega Naroda	
Slovenian National Party	Slovene: Slovenska Nacionalna Stranka	

=== Spain ===
Name	Native name(s)	Reference(s)
Endavant (Forward)		
España 2000 (Spain 2000)		
Podemos (We Can)		
Popular Unity Candidacy	Catalan: Candidatura d'Unitat Popular	
Spanish Alternative	Spanish: Alternativa Española	
Vox (Latin for 'Voice')		

=== Sweden ===
Name	Native name(s)	Reference(s)
Alternative for Sweden	Swedish: Alternativ för Sverige	
Citizens' Coalition	Swedish: Medborgerlig Samling	
June List	Swedish: Junilistan	
New Future	Swedish: Ny Framtid	

=== Switzerland ===
Name	Native name(s)	Reference(s)
Federal Democratic Union of Switzerland	German: Eidgenössisch-Demokratische Union, French: Union Démocratique Fédérale, Italian: Unione Democratica Federale, Romansh: Uniun Democrata Federala	
Swiss Democrats	German: Schweizer Demokraten, French: Démocrates Suisses, Italian: Democratici Svizzeri, Romansh: Democrats Svizers	
Swiss People's Party	German: Schweizerische Volkspartei, French: Union démocratique du centre, Italian: Unione Democratica di Centro, Romansh: Partida Populara Svizra	
Ticino League	German: Liga der Tessiner, French: Ligue des Tessinois, Italian: Lega dei Ticinesi	

=== Turkey ===
Name	Native name(s)	Reference(s)
Centre Party	Turkish: Merkez Parti	
Communist Movement of Turkey	Turkish: Türkiye Komünist Hareketi	
Conservative Ascension Party	Turkish: Muhafazakar Yükseliş Partisi	
Felicity Party	Turkish: Saadet Partisi	
Justice and Development Party	Turkish: Adalet ve Kalkınma Partisi	
Nationalist Movement Party	Turkish: Milliyetçi Hareket Partisi	
Nationalist Turkey Party	Turkish: Milliyetçi Türkiye Partisi	
People's Alliance	Turkish: Cumhur İttifakı	
Workers' Fraternity Party	Turkish: İşçi Kardeşliği Partisi	

=== Ukraine ===
Name	Native name(s)	Reference(s)
Communist Party of Ukraine	Ukrainian: Комуністична партія України, romanized: Komunistychna partiya Ukrayiny, Russian: Коммунистическая партия Украины, romanized: Kommunisticheskaya partiya Ukrainy	
Nashi (Ours)	Ukrainian: Наші	
National Corps	Ukrainian: Національний корпус, romanized: Natsionalnyi korpus	
Opposition Bloc	Ukrainian: Опозиційний блок, Russian: Оппозиционный блок	
Opposition Bloc (2019)	Ukrainian: Опозиційний блок	
Opposition Platform — For Life	Ukrainian: Опозиційна платформа – За життя, Russian: Оппозиционная платформа – За жизнь	
Party of Christian Socialists	Ukrainian: Партія Християнських соціалістів, Russian: Партия Христианских социалистов	
Party of Regions	Ukrainian: Партія регіонів, romanized: Partiia rehioniv, Russian: Партия регионов, romanized: Partiya regionov	
Party of Shariy	Ukrainian: Партія Шарія, Russian: Партия Шария	
Peace to Luhanshchyna	Ukrainian: Спокій Луганщині, romanized: Spokiy Luhanshchyni, Russian: Мир Луганщине, romanized: Mir Luganshchine	
Progressive Socialist Party of Ukraine	Ukrainian: Прогресивна соціалістична партія України, romanized: Prohresyvna sotsialistychna partiya Ukrayiny, Russian: Прогрессивная социалистическая партия Украины, romanized: Progressivnaya sotsialisticheskaya partiya Ukrainy	
Right Sector	Ukrainian: Пра́вий се́ктор, romanized: Pravyi sektor	

=== United Kingdom ===
Name	Native name(s)	Reference(s)
Anti-Federalist League		
Brexit Party/Reform UK		
British National Party		
Communist Party of Britain		
Communist Party of Britain (Marxist–Leninist)		
Democratic Unionist Party		
Democrats and Veterans Direct Democracy Party		
English Democrats		
Liberal Party		
Independence from Europe		
National Front		
New Nationalist Party		
Referendum Party		
Scottish Family Party		
Scottish Libertarian Party		
Social Democratic Party		
Socialist Labour Party		
Trade Unionist and Socialist Coalition		
Traditional Unionist Voice		
UK Independence Party		
United Kingdom First Party		
Veritas		
We Demand a Referendum Now		

== See also ==
- List of pro-European political parties

== Sources ==
- Fielding, Nigel (1981). The National Front. London: Routledge & Kegan Paul. ISBN 978-0-7100-0559-5.
- Lynch, Philip; Whitaker, Richard; Loomes, Gemma (2012). "The UK Independence Party: Understanding a Niche Party's Strategy, Candidates and Supporters". Parliamentary Affairs. 65 (4): 733–757. doi:10.1093/pa/gsr042. hdl:2381/28316.
- Szczerbiak, Aleks; Taggart, Paul (2008). Opposing Europe?: The Comparative Party Politics of Euroscepticism: Volume 1: Case Studies and Country Surveys. Oxford: Oxford University Press. ISBN 978-0-19-925830-7.
- Tournier-Sol, Karine (2015). "Reworking the Eurosceptic and Conservative Traditions into a Populist Narrative: UKIP's Winning Formula?". Journal of Common Market Studies. 53 (1): 140–156. doi:10.1111/jcms.12208. S2CID 142738345.
- Walker, Martin (1977). The National Front. London: Fontana. ISBN 978-0-00-634824-5.
- Wilkinson, Paul (1981). The New Fascists. London: Grant McIntyre. ISBN 978-0-330-26953-7.
- Woodbridge, Steven (2011). "Ambivalent Admiration? The Response of Other Extreme-Right Groups to the Rise of the BNP". In Copsey, Nigel; Macklin, Graham (eds.). British National Party: Contemporary Perspectives. London and New York: Routledge. pp. 103–122. ISBN 978-0-415-48383-4.
