= 2013 Icelandic parliamentary election =

2013 parliamentary election in Iceland

- 27 April 2013
- All 63 seats in the Althing; 32 seats needed for a majority
- Turnout: 81.50%
Party	Leader	Vote %	Seats	+/–
Independence	Bjarni Benediktsson	26.70	19	+3
Progressive	Sigmundur Davíð Gunnlaugsson	24.43	19	+10
Social Democratic	Árni Páll Árnason	12.85	9	−11
Left-Green	Katrín Jakobsdóttir	10.87	7	−7
Bright Future	Guðmundur Steingrímsson	8.25	6	New
Pirates	Collective leadership	5.10	3	New
This lists parties that won seats. See the complete results below.
Results by constituency
Prime Minister before	Prime Minister after election
Jóhanna Sigurðardóttir; Social Democratic	Sigmundur Davíð Gunnlaugsson; Progressive

Parliamentary elections were held in Iceland on 27 April 2013. Fifteen parties contested the elections, compared to just seven in the previous elections. The result was a victory for the two centre-right opposition parties, the Independence Party and Progressive Party, which subsequently formed a coalition government. The parties were eurosceptic and their win brought to a halt partially completed negotiations with the European Union regarding Icelandic membership.

== Background ==
The previous elections in 2009 were won by the Social Democratic Alliance – the first time that the Independence Party was not the largest party in the Althing. The Social Democratic Alliance was able to form a coalition with the Left-Green Movement. As a result of this, Jóhanna Sigurðardóttir became the first female prime minister of Iceland, as well as the first openly lesbian head of government in the world.

== Incumbent parliament ==
Five parties were elected at the previous election, held in April 2009. Since then, the parliamentary representation for one of these, Citizens' Movement, first mostly moved to The Movement and then, in March 2012, to the new party Dawn. One of the MPs elected for the Citizens' movement, Þráinn Bertelsson, left the parliamentary party almost immediately and then a 16 months after the 2009 election he joined the Left-green movement. In January 2012, the new party Solidarity was founded by an incumbent MP, Lilja Mósesdóttir, who was elected as a member of the Left-Green Movement. Another new party, Bright Future, was formed in February 2012 with the involvement of two MPs from, respectively, the Progressive Party and Social Democratic Alliance. One MP originally elected for Citizens' Movement, Birgitta Jónsdóttir, also participated in the establishment of a new party in 2012, namely the Pirate Party. Two eurosceptic Left-Green Movement MPs, Jón Bjarnason and Atli Gíslason, also decided to defect and form the new Rainbow Movement in March 2013. The box below shows the distribution of seats in the incumbent parliament on 28 March 2013, the last working day of the parliament's term.

Previous distribution of seats in parliament	On 28 March 2013
Social Democratic Alliance	19
Independence Party	16
Left-Green Movement	12
Progressive Party	8
Bright Future (G. Steingrímsson and R. Marshall)	2
Dawn (Þór Saari and Margrét Tryggvadóttir)	2
Rainbow (Atli Gíslason and Jón Bjarnason)	2
Pirate Party (Birgitta Jónsdóttir)	1
Solidarity (Lilja Mósesdóttir)	1

== Retiring MPs ==
The following MPs decided not to run for re-election:

- Jóhanna Sigurðardóttir (Prime Minister, former chairman of the Social Democratic Alliance)
- Ásta Ragnheiður Jóhannesdóttir (Speaker of Parliament, former Minister of Social Affairs, Social Democratic Alliance)
- Siv Friðleifsdóttir (former Minister of Health and Social Security, member of the Progressive Party)
- Birkir Jón Jónsson (vice president of the Progressive Party)
- Þorgerður Katrín Gunnarsdóttir (former Minister of Education, Science and Culture, member of the Independence Party)
- Ólöf Nordal (vice president of the Independence Party)
- Ásbjörn Óttarsson (member of the Independence Party)
- Árni Johnsen (member of the Independence Party)
- Þuríður Backman (Deputy Speaker of Parliament since 2003, member of the Left-Green Movement)
- Guðfríður Lilja Grétarsdóttir (member of the Left-Green Movement)
- Þráinn Bertelsson (member of the Left-Green Movement)
- Lilja Mósesdóttir (chairman of Solidarity)

== Constituencies ==
There are six constituencies in Iceland. According to the Law on Parliamentary Elections (nr.24/2000), each constituency is allocated 9 seats decided by proportional voting, with 9 special leveling seats (either 1 or 2 per constituency, depending on population size) adjusting the result so that proportionality is maintained according to the overall number of votes received by a party at the national level. The number of constituency seats will, however, be adjusted ahead of the next election, if the number of residents with suffrage per available seat in the constituency increases to more than twice as many as in the last election, when comparing the constituency with the highest number against the one with the lowest. In that case a constituency seat will be reassigned from the constituency with the lowest number to the one with the highest, until the rule is met. However, the total number of seats (including leveling seats) may never fall to less than six in any constituency. The box below shows the number of seats available in each constituency at the 2013 parliamentary election.

Constituency	Constituency seats	Leveling seats	Total seats
Reykjavik North	9	2	11
Reykjavik South	9	2	11
Southwest	11	2	13
Northwest	7	1	8
Northeast	9	1	10
South	9	1	10
Total	54	9	63

=== Method for apportionment of constituency seats ===
The available constituency seats are first distributed to each party according to the D'Hondt method, so that proportional representation is ensured within each of the constituencies. The next step is to apportion these party distributed seats to the candidates within the party having the highest "vote score", after counting both direct candidate votes and their share of party votes in the constituency. In Iceland the "candidate vote system" is that, for each constituency, each party provides a pre-ranked list of candidates beneath each party name (listed according to the preferred order decided by the party), but where the voters voting for the party can alter this pre-ranked order by renumbering the individual candidates and/or crossing out those candidates they do not like, so that such candidates will not get a share of the voter's "personal vote" for the party.

As a restriction on the possibility of re-ranking candidates, it is however only possible to alter the first several candidates on the list. The borderline for alterations is drawn for the first three candidates if the party only win one of the total seats in the constituency, or if more than one seat is won the borderline shall be drawn at the pre-ranked number equal to two times the total number of seats being won by the party in the constituency. So if a party has won two seats in a constituency, then the voter is only allowed to re-rank the top four ranked candidates on the list, with any rank altering by voters below this line simply being ignored when subsequently calculating the candidate vote shares within each party. Final calculation of the candidate vote shares is always done according to the Borda method, where all candidates above the previously described borderline in the ranking are granted voting fraction values according to the voters noted rank. If the number of considered candidates consist of four (as in the given example), then the first ranked candidate is assigned a value of 1 (a so-called full personal vote), the next one get the value 0.75 (1/4 less), followed likewise by 0.50 and 0.25 respectively for the two last candidates. If the number of considered candidates instead had been six (due to winning 3 seats), then the first ranked candidate in a similar way would be assigned a value of 1 (a so-called full personal vote), with the following five candidates receiving respectively 5/6, 4/6, 3/6, 2/6 and 1/6. As mentioned above, crossed out names will always be allocated a 0.00 value. The accumulated total score of the candidates voting fractions, will be used in determining which candidates receive the seats won by their party. Note that candidate vote scores are not directly comparable to candidates from other parties, as how many seats are being won in a constituency by a particular party will effect how their candidates receive voting fractions (like in the above examples, where a candidate ranked number four for a party winning two seats would receive a voting fraction of 0.25, compared to 0.50 for an equally ranked candidate belonging to a party winning 3 seats)

=== Method for apportionment of leveling seats ===
After the initial apportionment of constituency seats, all the parties that exceed the election threshold of 5% nationally will also qualify to potentially be granted the extra leveling seats, which seek to adjust the result towards seat proportionality at the national level.

The calculation procedure for the distribution of leveling seats is, first, for each party having exceeded the national threshold of 5%, to calculate the ratio of its total number of votes at the national level divided by the sum of one extra seat added to the number of seats the party have so far won. The first leveling seat will go to the party with the highest ratio of votes per seat. The same calculation process is then repeated, until all 9 leveling seats have been allocated to specific parties. A party's "votes per seat" ratio will change during this calculation process, after each additional leveling seat being won. The second and final step is for each party being granted a leveling seat to pin point, across all constituencies, which of its runner-up candidates (candidates that came short of winning direct election through a constituency seat) should then win this additional seat. This selection is made by first identifying the constituency having the strongest "relative constituency vote shares for this additional seat of the party", which is decided by another proportional calculation, where the "relative vote share for the party list in each constituency", is divided with the sum of "one extra seat added to the number of already won constituency seats by the party list in the constituency". When this strongest constituency has been identified, the leveling seat will be automatically granted to the highest placed unelected runner-up candidate on the party list in this constituency, who among the remaining candidates have the highest personal vote score (the same figure as the one used when ranking candidates for constituency seats).

The above described method is used for apportionment of all the party allocated leveling seats. Note that when selecting which of a party's constituencies shall receive its apportioned leveling seat, this identification may only happen in exactly the same numerical order as the leveling seats were calculated at the party level. This is important because the number of available leveling seats are limited per constituency, meaning that the last calculated leveling seats in all circumstances can never be granted to candidates who belong to constituencies where the available leveling seats already were granted to other parties.

== Participating parties ==
The final deadline for parties to apply for participation in the parliamentary election was 9 April 2013. To be approved for a list letter to participate in the election, new parties were required to submit a minimum of 300 signatures from supporters in each constituency where they intended to list. The participating parties also needed to submit a valid candidate list to the election committee in each of the constituencies where they intended to run, comprising twice as many candidate names as the number of available seats in the constituency, before 12 April. On 16 April the National Election Committee (Icelandic: Landskjörstjórn) published its list of 15 approved parties with 72 candidate lists, as 11 parties had opted to run in all six constituencies, while 2 parties opted only to run in two constituencies, and the final 2 parties were only present in one constituency.

Parties with a list for all constituencies

- Progressive Party (B list) led by Sigmundur Davíð Gunnlaugsson
- Independence Party (D list) led by Bjarni Benediktsson
- Social Democratic Alliance (S list) led by Árni Páll Árnason
- Bright Future (A list) led by Guðmundur Steingrímsson
- Left-Green Movement (V list) led by Katrín Jakobsdóttir
- Pirate Party (Þ list), collective leadership (a new party fighting against copyright laws and informational restrictions, founded 24 November 2012)
- Dawn (T list), collective leadership
- Iceland Democratic Party (L list), collective leadership (a new party split from Dawn, founded 16 February 2013)
- Right-Green Movement (G list) led by Guðmundur Franklín Jónsson
- Households Party (I list) led by Pétur Gunnlaugsson (new party founded 19 March 2013, as a merger of Republican Party (a split from Independence Party), Sovereign Union, Sjálfstæðir Sjálfstæðismenn, Þjóðarflokkurinn, 3 interest groups, and a group split from Solidarity)
- Rainbow (J list), Jón Bjarnason as spokesperson (new party founded in March 2013 by former Progressive MP Bjarni Harðarson and two incumbent MPs defecting from Left-Green: Jón Bjarnason and Atli Gíslason)

Parties with a list for only some constituencies

- People's Front of Iceland (R list) led by Thorvaldur Thorvaldsson (a new anticapitalist party, founded 18 February 2013). Will only run in the two Reykjavik constituencies.
- Humanist Party (H list) led by Júlíus Valdimarsson (related to the International Humanist Party. Their last electoral participation was in the 1999 election) Will only run in the two Reykjavik constituencies.
- Rural Party (M list) led by Ylfa Mist Helgadóttir (new party founded 23 February 2013) Will only run in the Northwest constituency.
- Sturla Jónsson (K list) led by Sturla Jónsson (formerly known as "Forward Moving Party", but was renamed after the founder's own name on 5 April 2013) Will only run in the "Reykjavik South" constituency.

Despite having a current member presence in the incumbent parliament, the party Solidarity (C list) decided not to run for election. Likewise these recently established parties also decided not to participate: Optimism Party (E list), Christian Political Movement, and Liberal Democrats.

While all applying party lists by the end of the day were getting approved, it was clear that all those who had applied for running the election as single independent candidates were disapproved. According to the Icelandic constitution and election law, independent candidates are not allowed to run in parliamentary elections, unless they manage to join forces with other independent candidates to establish a full complete candidate list for a new group named "independent candidates" in the constituency they intend to run. Last time Iceland had a list of "independent candidates" approved to participate was back in the 2003 elections, where "Independents from the South constituency (Óháðir í Suðurkjördæmi)" was approved as a local list in the South constituency.

== European Union accession negotiations ==
On 14 January 2013, the two governing parties of Iceland, the Social Democratic Alliance and Left-Green Movement, announced that because it was no longer possible to complete EU accession negotiations before the parliamentary elections, they had decided to slow down the process and that the 6 remaining unopened chapters would not be opened until after the election. However, negotiations would continue for the 16 chapters already opened. The new party Bright Future supports the completion of negotiations, while two opposition parties, Independence Party and Progressive Party, argue that negotiations should be completely stopped. In February 2013, the national congress of both the Independence Party and Progressive Party reconfirmed their policy that further membership negotiations with the EU should be stopped and not resumed unless they are first approved by a national referendum, while the national congresses of the Social Democratic Alliance, Bright Future and Left-Green Movement reiterated their support for the completion of EU accession negotiations.

On 19 March 2013, Þorgerður Katrín Gunnarsdóttir, an Independence Party MP, put forward a motion in the Althing calling for a referendum asking the Icelandic public whether EU accession negotiations should continue. She proposed that the referendum be held during the upcoming parliamentary election in April if possible, or else during local elections in the spring of 2014. In response to Þorgerður and other proponents of EU integration within the Independence Party, Bjarni Benediktsson, the leader of the party, reiterated the party's policy of stopping negotiations with the EU, but promised to hold a referendum on continuing the negotiations in the first half of their term if they form government.

== Campaign ==
The list below gives a short summary of significant events in the electoral campaign of each participating party.

- Independence Party: On 11 April 2013 Chairman of the Independence Party Bjarni Benediktsson said he might step down as party chairman before the upcoming elections, according to an interview on RÚV. This came following recent opinion polls which showed the party performing worse than their historically bad 2009 result, and a MMR survey which showed the party's popularity would increase with Vice Chairwoman and former Mayor of Reykjavík Hanna Birna Kristjánsdóttir as leader. However, the following day the party's youth wing, Young Independents, declared their full support for Bjarni and on 13 April he announced he would continue on as leader, stating the party's decline in polls was not something that could be changed so easily.
- Bright Future: The chairman's grandmother announced on 9 March her shift away from a lifelong political support for the Progressive Party, and now will stand as a 104-year-old candidate for Bright Future in the Reykjavík North constituency (albeit as the last 22nd name of the list, with a low chance for election), and thus hoped to signal the party does not only represent a new generation, but also older generations.
- Iceland Democratic Party: On 25 April 2013 the central committee of Iceland Democratic Party sent a letter to Dawn requesting they cooperate in the election, given that both parties were polling below the 5% threshold for leveling seats and were unlikely to gain constituency seats. The letter proposed they send a joint letter to the National Election Committee requesting that their votes be counted together as one party. Dawn refused the offer the next morning, saying the deadline for a joint candidacy had expired on 12 April, and there would be doubt as to the legitimacy of their cooperating at that point. The two parties had considered cooperating prior to the 12 April deadline, but discussions were unsuccessful.
- Right-Green Movement: The Right-Green Movement came under scandal when it was revealed that party chairman Guðmundur Franklín Jónsson didn't pay taxes in Iceland, and also didn't have residency in Iceland (making him ineligible to run for parliament.)
- Rainbow: On 16 March 2013, Thorstein Bergsson, previously a candidate for the Left-Green Movement, announced he was leaving the party and joining Rainbow, saying he was disappointed by the party's position on the EU. The party subsequently announced Thorstein would have the number two spot on the party's list in the Northeast constituency.

== Opinion polls ==
Graph of polls from January 2012. Stars stand for national surveys, when many surveys were taken within a four-day period, the average is taken and the line follows the average.

Independence
Progressive
Bright Future
Social Democratic
Left-Green
Right-Green
Dawn
Pirate Party
Solidarity
The Movement
Other

Institute	Release date	C	V	S	T	L	Þ	A	B	D	G	Others
2009 result	29 Apr 2009	n/a	21.7%	29.8%	n/a	n/a	n/a	n/a	14.8%	23.7%	n/a	2.8%
Þjóðarpúls Gallup	31 Jan 2012	–	13.7%	21.8%	3.4%	–	–	–	15.4%	36.1%	–	9.5%
Fréttablaðið / Stöð 2	9 Feb 2012	21.3%	8.0%	12.3%	1.7%	–	–	6.1%	12.5%	35.0%	0.9%	1.2%
Þjóðarpúls Gallup	29 Feb 2012	11.3%	12.0%	18.7%	2.7%	–	–	4.3%	13.0%	33.3%	–	4.7%
MMR	18 Mar 2012	9.1%	11.3%	18.3%	2.6%	–	–	4.3%	13.2%	37.3%	–	3.9%
Þjóðarpúls Gallup	29 Mar 2012	8.9%	11.2%	17.5%	1.9%	–	–	4.7%	13.0%	38.2%	–	4.6%
Fréttablaðið / Stöð 2	12 Apr 2012	6.0%	8.6%	14.8%	2.1%	–	–	7.2%	14.6%	42.6%	2.3%	0.9%
MMR	17 Apr 2012	4.5%	13.2%	14.6%	2.1%	–	–	8.1%	14.5%	39.0%	–	3.9%
Þjóðarpúls Gallup	26 Apr 2012	6.9%	11.5%	18.7%	5.4%	–	–	5.6%	12.5%	37.0%	–	2.4%
MMR	15 May 2012	3.1%	14.1%	17.7%	2.6%	–	–	7.6%	12.8%	38.5%	–	3.6%
Fréttablaðið / Stöð 2	24 May 2012	5.1%	9.2%	13.6%	2.7%	–	–	5.3%	15.8%	43.7%	–	3.9%
Þjóðarpúls Gallup	31 May 2012	5.6%	10.4%	17.7%	5.4%	–	–	4.0%	12.9%	39.3%	–	4.6%
MMR	19 Jun 2012	4.4%	13.3%	16.4%	3.1%	–	–	4.6%	17.5%	36.4%	–	4.3%
Þjóðarpúls Gallup	28 Jun 2012	4.7%	11.9%	18.8%	4.3%	–	–	4.3%	12.7%	38.2%	3.6%	1.6%
MMR	16 Jul 2012	2.5%	11.4%	16.9%	3.9%	–	–	4.1%	17.0%	38.5%	–	5.7%
Þjóðarpúls Gallup	29 Jul 2012	2.7%	12.2%	21.0%	4.1%	–	–	5.2%	12.4%	36.9%	3.1%	2.5%
Þjóðarpúls Gallup	31 Aug 2012	3.0%	13.3%	20.7%	3.7%	–	–	4.5%	13.8%	36.0%	3.0%	2.0%
MMR	6 Sep 2012	1.7%	12.9%	19.3%	1.4%	–	–	5.9%	13.3%	40.6%	–	4.8%
MMR	20 Sep 2012	1.0%	15.8%	17.7%	2.6%	–	–	6.8%	17.0%	34.9%	–	4.1%
Þjóðarpúls Gallup	27 Sep 2012	2.4%	12.4%	19.4%	3.6%	–	–	4.9%	14.2%	37.1%	4.4%	1.7%
MMR	12 Oct 2012	3.1%	13.9%	21.2%	2.1%	–	–	8.8%	11.2%	35.3%	2.1%	1.9%
Þjóðarpúls Gallup	31 Oct 2012	1.9%	11.7%	22.1%	3.8%	–	–	6.9%	12.1%	36.2%	3.8%	1.7%
MMR	13 Nov 2012	2.3%	11.3%	18.6%	2.4%	–	–	10.8%	12.0%	37.7%	3.1%	1.8%
Þjóðarpúls Gallup	29 Nov 2012	1.7%	10.6%	22.5%	3.8%	–	–	8.1%	12.7%	35.9%	3.3%	1.7%
MMR	11 Dec 2012	1.9%	11.2%	17.4%	3.1%	–	–	11.5%	13.6%	37.4%	2.0%	2.0%
Þjóðarpúls Gallup	28 Dec 2012	1.3%	9.1%	19.1%	3.0%	–	2.5%	12.3%	13.1%	36.3%	2.6%	0.4%
Fréttablaðið / Stöð 2	17 Jan 2013	0.6%	7.3%	19.2%	1.9%	–	1.0%	14.4%	11.9%	40.7%	1.9%	1.0%
Plúsinn	20 Jan 2013	1.0%	5.0%	19.9%	2.0%	–	1.0%	14.1%	12.5%	40.6%	3.0%	0.1%
MMR	20 Jan 2012	1.4%	8.6%	17.3%	2.2%	–	–	17.6%	14.8%	34.5%	2.0%	1.5%
Þjóðarpúls Gallup	31 Jan 2013	1.0%	7.9%	15.6%	2.1%	–	2.1%	18.6%	14.2%	35.5%	2.5%	0.4%
Fréttablaðið / Stöð 2	31 Jan 2013	–	11.4%	11.9%	1.5%	–	0.9%	16.4%	20.8%	32.0%	4.3%	0.2%
Plúsinn	3 Feb 2013	3.0%	5.7%	14.4%	2.0%	–	2.0%	14.0%	18.4%	32.7%	6.0%	1.0%
MMR	6 Feb 2013	0.7%	8.6%	16.2%	0.9%	–	–	17.8%	19.5%	33.0%	1.8%	1.4%
MMR	26 Feb 2013	–	9.5%	12.8%	2.2%	–	2.4%	15.3%	23.8%	28.5%	2.5%	3.0%
Þjóðarpúls Gallup	28 Feb 2013	–	7.4%	15.4%	1.3%	–	2.3%	16.2%	22.1%	29.7%	3.2%	–
Fréttablaðið / Stöð 2	1 Mar 2013	–	11.8%	12.8%	2.0%	2.6%	1.5%	8.7%	26.1%	29.0%	2.6%	2.3%
Félagsvísindastofnun HÍ	4 Mar 2013	–	9.9%	16.1%	0.9%	3.7%	1.8%	12.0%	22.4%	29.4%	2.3%	1.4%
MMR	14 Mar 2013	–	9.6%	12.4%	1.9%	–	3.6%	15.2%	25.9%	27.2%	2.1%	2.0%
Þjóðarpúls Gallup	15 Mar 2013	–	8.9%	14.0%	0.7%	3.3%	3.8%	13.2%	25.5%	26.8%	2.8%	1.0%
Fréttablaðið / Stöð 2	16 Mar 2013	–	7.1%	13.8%	1.6%	1.4%	1.8%	9.1%	31.9%	27.6%	2.4%	2.0%
Félagsvísindastofnun HÍ	26 Mar 2013	–	8.0%	12.8%	1.4%	2.6%	3.3%	11.4%	28.5%	26.1%	2.1%	3.0%
MMR	27 Mar 2013	–	8.7%	12.5%	1.7%	1.7%	3.9%	12.0%	29.5%	24.4%	2.5%	3.2%
Þjóðarpúls Gallup	1 Apr 2013	–	8.5%	15.0%	1.5%	3.1%	4.4%	12.7%	28.3%	22.4%	2.1%	2.0%
Fréttablaðið / Stöð 2	4 Apr 2013	–	5.6%	9.5%	0.6%	2.8%	5.6%	8.3%	40.0%	17.8%	3.5%	5.0%
MMR	8 Apr 2013	–	8.1%	12.7%	1.9%	3.6%	7.8%	9.2%	30.2%	21.2%	2.2%	3.0%
Félagsvísindastofnun HÍ	10 Apr 2013	–	8.8%	12.6%	1.4%	3.0%	5.6%	10.9%	30.9%	18.9%	2.7%	5.2%
Þjóðarpúls Gallup	11 Apr 2013	–	7.3%	12.2%	2.5%	3.8%	6.8%	10.1%	29.4%	21.9%	–	6.0%
MMR	15 Apr 2013	–	6.7%	10.4%	3.6%	3.0%	9.0%	9.5%	32.7%	22.9%	1.0%	1.4%
Fréttablaðið / Stöð 2	17 Apr 2013	–	7.9%	13.7%	3.0%	1.7%	5.6%	6.5%	30.3%	26.9%	0.8%	3.6%
MMR	18 Apr 2013	–	8.1%	13.5%	3.6%	2.2%	6.7%	8.3%	25.6%	27.5%	1.7%	2.6%
Þjóðarpúls Gallup	18 Apr 2013	–	8.8%	15.2%	3.0%	2.6%	8.4%	8.0%	26.7%	24.1%	1.2%	2.0%
Félagsvísindastofnun HÍ	19 Apr 2013	–	9.3%	12.2%	3.0%	3.3%	6.3%	7.4%	28.1%	24.4%	1.6%	4.4%
Fréttablaðið / Stöð 2	24 Apr 2013	–	10.4%	13.3%	2.4%	2.6%	6.3%	8.1%	25.9%	23.8%	2.5%	4.7%
Félagsvísindastofnun HÍ	25 Apr 2013	–	10.8%	13.6%	3.2%	2.6%	6.4%	7.3%	24.4%	24.8%	2.8%	4.1%
MMR	25 Apr 2013	–	11.6%	13.0%	2.9%	3.5%	7.5%	7.7%	22.4%	26.7%	1.3%	3.4%
Fréttablaðið / Stöð 2	26 Apr 2013	–	10.9%	14.7%	3.0%	2.0%	6.3%	7.6%	25.4%	22.9%	2.4%	4.8%
Þjóðarpúls Gallup	26 Apr 2013	–	10.0%	14.6%	2.6%	2.8%	6.1%	6.6%	24.7%	27.9%	2.6%	2.1%

Notes:

- The election threshold for a party to win leveling seats for the Icelandic parliament is 5.0% of the nationwide vote.
- Prior to March 2012, Dawn was polled as The Movement.

== Results ==
The centre-right Independence party was one of the election's winners with 26.7% of the votes, regaining their position as Iceland's largest party. Two new parties entered the Althing for the first time. The green liberal Bright Future got 8.3% of the votes and The Pirate Party got 5.1% of the votes, just above the 5% threshold for leveling mandates.

Voter turnout was the lowest in any general election since Iceland's independence from Denmark. By 20 April, 582 people had voted using early voting. This represented an increase of approximately 1,400 votes over the number of early votes cast in the 2009 election. By 26 April, 24,850 people had voted. Prior to the elections, it was not clear whether this meant that turnout would be increased or just that early voting had become more popular.

Party	Votes	%	+/–	Seats	+/–
Independence Party	50,455	26.70	+3.00	19	+3
Progressive Party	46,173	24.43	+9.63	19	+10
Social Democratic Alliance	24,294	12.85	–16.94	9	–11
Left-Green Movement	20,546	10.87	–10.81	7	–7
Bright Future	15,584	8.25	New	6	New
Pirate Party	9,648	5.10	New	3	New
Dawn	5,855	3.10	New	0	New
Households Party	5,707	3.02	New	0	New
Iceland Democratic Party	4,658	2.46	New	0	New
Right-Green People's Party	3,262	1.73	New	0	New
Rainbow	2,021	1.07	New	0	New
Rural Party	326	0.17	New	0	New
Sturla Jónsson	222	0.12	New	0	New
Humanist Party	126	0.07	New	0	New
People's Front of Iceland	118	0.06	New	0	New
**Total**	**188,995**	**100.00**	–	**63**	**0**
Valid votes	188,995	97.51			
Invalid/blank votes	4,827	2.49			
Total votes	**193,822**	**100.00**			
Registered voters/turnout	237,807	81.50			
Source: Landskjörstjórn Election Resources

=== Elected MPs ===
Government (38)

Progressive Party (19)
Independence Party (19)

Opposition (25)

Social Democratic Alliance (9)
Left-Green Movement (7)
Bright Future (6)
Pirate Party (3)

Members of the Althing elected on 27 April 2013
Reykjavik North	Reykjavik South	Southwest	Northwest	Northeast	South
1. Illugi Gunnarsson (D); 2. Frosti Sigurjónsson (B); 3. Katrín Jakobsdóttir (V); 4. Össur Skarphéðinsson (S); 5. Brynjar Þór Níelsson (D); 6. Björt Ólafsdóttir (A); 7. Sigrún Magnúsdóttir (B); 8. Árni Þór Sigurðsson (V); 9. Birgir Ármannsson (D); L1. Helgi Hrafn Gunnarsson (Þ); L7. Valgerður Bjarnadóttir (S)	1. Hanna B. Kristjánsdóttir (D); 2. Vigdís Hauksdóttir (B); 3. Sigríður I. Ingadóttir (S); 4. Pétur H. Blöndal (D); 5. Svandís Svavarsdóttir (V); 6. Róbert Marshall (A); 7. Guðlaugur Þór Þórðarson (D); 8. Karl Garðarsson (B); 9. Helgi Hjörvar (S); L2. Ásta Guðrún Helgadóttir (Þ); L5. Óttarr Proppé (A)	1. Bjarni Benediktsson (D); 2. Eygló Harðardóttir (B); 3. Ragnheiður Ríkharðsdóttir (D); 4. Árni Páll Árnason (S); 5. Willum Þór Þórsson (B); 6. Jón Gunnarsson (D); 7. Guðmundur Steingrímsson (A); 8. Ögmundur Jónasson (V); 9. Vilhjálmur Bjarnason (D); 10.Þorsteinn Sæmundsson (B); 11.Katrín Júlíusdóttir (S); L4. Birgitta Jónsdóttir (Þ); L8. Elín Hirst (D)	1. Gunnar Bragi Sveinsson (B); 2. Einar K. Guðfinnsson (D); 3. Ásmundur Einar Daðason (B); 4. Haraldur Benediktsson (D); 5. Guðbjartur Hannesson (S); 6. Elsa Lára Arnardóttir (B); 7. Jóhanna M. Sigmundsdóttir (B); L6. Lilja R. Magnúsdóttir (V)	1. Sigmundur D. Gunnlaugsson (B); 2. Kristján Þór Júlíusson (D); 3. Höskuldur Þór Þórhallsson (B); 4. Steingrímur J. Sigfússon (V); 5. Líneik Anna Sævarsdóttir (B); 6. Valgerður Gunnarsdóttir (D); 7. Kristján L. Möller (S); 8. Þórunn Egilsdóttir (B); 9. Bjarkey Gunnarsdóttir (V); L3. Brynhildur Pétursdóttir (A)	1. Sigurður I. Jóhannsson (B); 2. Ragnheiður E. Árnadóttir (D); 3. Silja Dögg Gunnarsdóttir (B); 4. Unnur Brá Konráðsdóttir (D); 5. Páll Jóhann Pálsson (B); 6. Oddný G. Harðardóttir (S); 7. Ásmundur Friðriksson (D); 8. Haraldur Einarsson (B); 9. Vilhjálmur Árnason (D); L9. Páll Valur Björnsson (A)
Key: D = Independence Party; B = Progressive Party; S = Social Democratic Alliance; V = Left-Green Movement; A = Bright Future; Þ = Pirate Party; L1-L9 = Leveling seats nr.1-9. Source: Morgunblaðið and Landskjörstjórn (The National Electoral Commission)

For the parties having qualified with a national result above the 5% election threshold, the 9 leveling seats (L1-L9) were first distributed party-wise according to the calculation method in this particular order (where the party's total number of national votes was divided by the sum of "won seats plus 1" - with an extra leveling seat granted to the party with the highest fraction - while repeating this process until all 9 leveling seats had been determined). At the next step, these leveling seats were then by the same order distributed one by one to the relative strongest constituency of the seat winning party (while disregarding the constituencies that already ran out of vacant leveling seats). At the third step, the specific leveling seat is finally granted to the party's highest ranked runner-up candidate within the constituency, according to the same accumulated candidate vote score as being used when apportioning the constituency seats.

The table below display how the leveling seats were apportioned, and the "relative constituency strength" figures for each party, which is measured for each constituency as the "party vote share" divided by "won constituency seats of the party +1". To illustrate how the selection method works, each party in a constituency being apportioned a leveling seat, have got their figure for relative strength (vote share per seat) bolded in the table, with a parenthesis noting the number of the leveling seat. Because constituencies run out of available leveling seats one by one as the calculation progress, it can sometimes happen that the constituency with the highest relative strength needs to be disregarded. In example, if there had been no restrictions to the available number of leveling seats in a constituency, then the table below would have distributed the Independence Party's L8-seat to its relative strongest Northwest Constituency with an 8.22% vote share per seat; But as the one and only leveling seat of this constituency had already been granted to the Left-Green party (who won the L6-seat), then the L8-seat instead had to be granted to a relatively weaker constituency, which to be more exact ended only being the fourth strongest constituency for the Independence Party - namely the Southwest constituency with a 6.14% vote share per seat.

Candidates selected for the 9 leveling seats (L1-L9 are first apportioned at national level to parties, then to the relative strongest constituency of the party, and finally given to its highest ranked runner-up candidate)	Leveling seats won by party	Reykjavik North (party vote share divided by won local seats +1)	Reykjavik South (party vote share divided by won local seats +1)	Southwest (party vote share divided by won local seats +1)	Northwest (party vote share divided by won local seats +1)	Northeast (party vote share divided by won local seats +1)	South (party vote share divided by won local seats +1)
Independence Party (D)	L8	5.84% 4.67% (Note: Party vote share divided by "won constituency seats +2", has also been calculated for constituencies with two leveling seats (as each party in theory has a chance to win both of them).)	6.70% 5.36%	**6.14% (L8)**; 5.12%	8.22%	7.52%	5.65%
Progressive Party (B)		5.48% 4.11%	5.60% 4.20%	5.38% 4.31%	7.03%	6.92%	6.89%
Social Democratic Alliance (S)	L7	**7.13% (L7)**; 4.75%	4.73% 3.55%	4.55% 3.41%	6.11%	5.30%	5.09%
Left-Green Movement (V)	L6	5.22% 3.92%	6.06% 4.04%	3.93% 2.62%	**8.47% (L6)**	5.27%	5.88%
Bright Future (A)	L3+L5+L9	5.10% 3.40%	**5.37% (L5)**; 3.58%	4.61% 3.07%	4.56%	**6.51% (L3)**	**4.47% (L9)**
Pirate Party (Þ)	L1+L2+L4	**6.87% (L1)**; 3.43%	**6.17% (L2)**; 3.09%	**5.00% (L4)**; 2.50%	3.09%	3.03%	4.72%

== Aftermath ==
Following the elections, a coalition government was formed between the Progressive Party and Independence Party with Progressive Party's Sigmundur Davíð Gunnlaugsson as prime minister. The Progressive Party received four ministries, and the Independence Party received five.
