= List of political parties in Iceland =

Iceland has a multi-party system with many political parties, in which often no one party has a chance of gaining power alone, and parties must work with each other to form coalition governments.

Nine parties were elected at the 2022 Icelandic municipal elections. Six parties were elected at the 2024 Icelandic parliamentary election to the Althing.

== Political parties ==
=== Parliamentary representation from November 2024 ===
The box below shows the distribution of seats in the incumbent parliament.

| Party | Election symbol | Ideology | Political position | Leader | Founded | MPs | Municipal seats |
|---|---|---|---|---|---|---|---|
| Social Democratic Alliance; Samfylkingin | S | Social democracy | Centre-left | Kristrún Frostadóttir | 2000 | 15 / 63 | 38 / 453 |
| Independence Party; Sjálfstæðisflokkurinn | D | Conservatism; Economic liberalism; Liberal conservatism | Centre-right | Guðrún Hafsteinsdóttir | 1929 | 14 / 63 | 130 / 453 |
| Liberal Reform Party; Viðreisn | C | Liberalism; Economic liberalism; Green liberalism | Centre to centre-right | Þorgerður Katrín Gunnarsdóttir | 2016 | 11 / 63 | 9 / 453 |
| People's Party; Flokkur Fólksins | F | Populism | Fiscal: Centre-left; Social: Right-wing | Inga Sæland | 2016 | 10 / 63 | 0 / 453 |
| Centre Party; Miðflokkurinn | M | Agrarianism; Conservatism; Icelandic nationalism; Right-wing populism | Right-wing | Sigmundur Davíð Gunnlaugsson | 2017 | 8 / 63 | 23 / 453 |
| Progressive Party; Framsóknarflokkurinn | B | Liberalism; Agrarianism; Liberal conservatism | Centre to centre-right | Lilja Dögg Alfreðsdóttir | 1916 | 5 / 63 | 54 / 453 |

=== Active parties, without representation in the Althing ===
| Party | Election symbol | Ideology | Political position | Leader | Founded | Municipal seats |
|---|---|---|---|---|---|---|
| Left-Green Movement; Vinstri græn | V | Democratic socialism; Eco-socialism; Feminism; Euroscepticism | Centre-left to left-wing | Svandís Svavarsdóttir | 1999 | 4 / 453 |
| The Left; Vinstrið | A | Socialism; Democratic socialism | Left-wing | Sanna Magdalena Mörtudóttir | 2026 | 2 / 453 |
| Socialist Party of Iceland; Sósíalistaflokkur Íslands | J | Socialism; Democratic socialism; Anti-neoliberalism | Left-wing | Jón Ferdínand Estherarson | 2017 | 1 / 453 |
| The Greens; Græningjar | G | Green politics | Centre-left | Kikka Sigurðardóttir | 2024 | 0 / 453 |
| Democratic Party; Lýðræðisflokkurinn | L | Libertarian conservatism; Right-libertarianism; Euroscepticism | Right-wing | Arnar Þór Jónsson | 2024 | 0 / 453 |
| Pirate Party; Píratar | P | Pirate politics; Direct democracy; Open government | | Oktavía Hrund Guðrúnar Jóns | 2012 | 0 / 453 |
| Responsible Future; Ábyrg framtíð | Y | Right-libertarianism; Anti-vaccination | Right-wing | Jóhannes Loftsson | 2021 | 0 / 453 |

=== Defunct parties ===
- Alliance of Social Democrats (Bandalag jafnaðarmanna)
- Best Party (Besti flokkurinn)
- Bright Future (Björt Framtíð)
- Citizens' Movement (Borgarahreyfingin)
- Citizen's Party (Borgaraflokkurinn)
- Communist Party (Kommúnistaflokkurinn)
- Communist Party (Marxist–Leninist) (Kommúnistaflokkurinn (m-l))
- Democracy Movement (Lýðræðishreyfingin)
- Dawn (Dögun)
- Freedom Party (Frelsisflokkurinn)
- Home Rule Party (Heimastjórnarflokkurinn)
- Households Party (Flokkur Heimilanna)
- Humanist Party (Húmanistaflokkurinn)
- Iceland Democratic Party (Lýðræðisvaktin)
- Icelandic Movement – Living Country (Íslandshreyfingin – lifandi land)
- Icelandic National Front (Íslenska þjóðfylkingin)
- Liberal Democratic Party (Frjálslyndi lýðræðisflokkurinn)
- Liberal Party (Frjálslyndi flokkurinn)
- National Awakening (Þjóðvaki)
- Nationalist Party (Flokkur Þjóðernissinna)
- National Preservation Party (Þjóðvarnarflokkurinn)
- New Force (Nýtt afl)
- Old Independence Party (Sjálfstæðisflokkurinn eldri)
- People's Alliance (Alþýðubandalagið)
- People's Front of Iceland (Alþýðufylkingin)
- People's Unity Party – Socialist Party (Sameiningarflokkur alþýðu - Sósíalistaflokkurinn)
- Rainbow (Regnboginn)
- Right-Green People's Party (Hægri grænir, flokkur fólksins)
- Rural Party (Landsbyggðarflokkurinn)
- Social Democratic Party (Alþýðuflokkurinn)
- Solidarity (Samstaða)
- The Movement (Hreyfingin)
- Union of Liberals and Leftists (Samtök frjálslyndra og vinstri manna)
- Women's List (Kvennalistinn)

== See also ==
- Politics of Iceland
- List of political parties by country
