= Republican Party (Iceland, 2013) =

Political party

The Republican Party (Icelandic: Lýðveldisflokkurinn) is a political party in Iceland. It is unrelated to the 1953 party of the same name, although the name was chosen as a homage to that party.

It was officially granted list letter I on 8 March 2013, and started to compose a candidate list for participation in the 2013 Icelandic parliamentary election. However, it abandoned participation in the election as a single party, choosing to merge with seven other parties into the Households Party, which contested the election under the list letter I.
