= Sturla Jónsson =

Icelandic political party formed by Sturla Jónsson

Sturla Jónsson, formerly known as the Progress Party (Icelandic: Framfaraflokkurinn), was an Icelandic political party. The party was known as the Progress Party from its founding on 17 December 2008 to 5 April 2013 when it was renamed after its founder.

The chairman of the party was Sturla Jónsson, teamster and protester, who is today most commonly known for his participation in a documentary movie about the Icelandic financial crisis in 2009. The political ideology of the party is currently unknown. It was officially founded on 17 December 2008, and in early 2009 it managed to collect more than 300 signatures for the purpose of running in the April 2009 parliamentary election. The party was granted the election letter A, but then subsequently failed to recruit enough candidates to actually represent the party and participate in the election. So it was never approved to participate, despite having applied with sufficient signatures.

In January 2013, it was rumoured by several Icelandic websites that the party was planning to contest the April 2013 parliamentary election. On 23 February, the party announced it had indeed now collected the minimum of 300 signatures, and applied to participate in the election with list letter K. The party received list letter K from the Ministry of Interior on 8 March 2013, and then established its election campaign centre in Sturla's old workshop with the main purpose to start composing a valid candidate list. When the deadline for submitting candidate lists expired on 12 April, the party was approved to participate in one of the six constituencies: Reykjavik Constituency South.

Sturla Jónsson's attempt also to list in other constituencies as a single independent candidate (without a list), was disapproved both by the electoral committees in these constituencies and by the National electoral Commission. This disapproval was expected, as the Icelandic constitution and election law stipulates that independent candidates are not allowed to run in parliamentary elections, unless they manage to join forces with other independent candidates to establish a full complete candidate list for a new group named "independent candidates" in the constituency they intend to run. Another peculiarity for the party's top candidate, was that he resided in the Reykjavik Constituency North, but opted to list his party list in the Reykjavík South constituency, and thus will not be able to vote for himself. Sturla explained he believed the biggest support base for his party was to be found in his neighbour constituency, which was the reason he had preferred to list there, but also used the opportunity to highlight that his party would actively work to reform the election law, so that Iceland in future elections should not be divided into any vote limiting constituencies, but instead only have one list of available parties and candidates for the entire island.

Sturla (the person) became a parliamentary candidate for Dawn in 2016.

== Electoral results ==
=== Parliament ===
Election	# of overall votes	% of overall vote	# of overall seats won	+/–	Position
2013	222	0.12	0 / 63	0	13th
