= Rainbow (Iceland) =

Rainbow Regnboginn
- Founded: March 2013
- Ideology: Environmentalism; Euroscepticism; Socialism
- Political position: Left-wing
- Colours: Red, Yellow, Green, Blue, Purple, Orange
- Seats in Parliament: 0 / 63

Website
- regnboginn.is

Rainbow (Icelandic: Regnboginn) is a Eurosceptic and socialist political party in Iceland, founded in March 2013 by former MP Bjarni Harðarson, who had been elected for the Progressive Party, and current MPs Jón Bjarnason and Atli Gíslason, both dissidents from the Left-Green Movement (VG). The party was founded in order to contest the 2013 Icelandic parliamentary election.

They successfully applied for the list letter J to contest the 2013 parliamentary election, and submitted an official candidate list on 12 April 2013. As of 2024, they are longer involved in any political movement.

== History ==
In 2012, the year prior to the formation of the new party, Bjarnason and Gíslason left VG to sit as independents. On 16 March 2013, Thorstein Bergsson, a candidate for the Left-Green Movement, announced he was leaving the party and joining Rainbow, saying he was disappointed by the party's position on the EU. The party subsequently announced Bergsson would have the number two spot on the party's list in the Northeast constituency.

== Ideology ==
The party seeks to address what they call "the most pending issue in Icelandic society today: the imminent accession to the European Union." It is a Eurosceptic party, with Left-Green MPs Jón Bjarnason and Atli Gíslason having left their previous party over disagreements regarding VG's policy towards NATO and the European Union. On other issues, they emphasise the need for equal pay for women, increasing the child benefit, expanding preventive healthcare, and breaking up large corporations. The party supports a mixed economy, dominated by the public sector and complemented by local private sector businesses.

== Electoral results ==
Alþingi
| Election year | # of overall votes | % of overall vote | # of overall seats won | ± |
| 2013 | 2,021 | 1.07 | 0 / 63 | |
