= Democracy Watch =

Democracy Watch may refer to:

- Democracy Watch (Canada)
- Iceland Democratic Party (Lýðræðisvaktin, 'Democracy Watch')
