= Lilja Mósesdóttir =

Icelandic politician

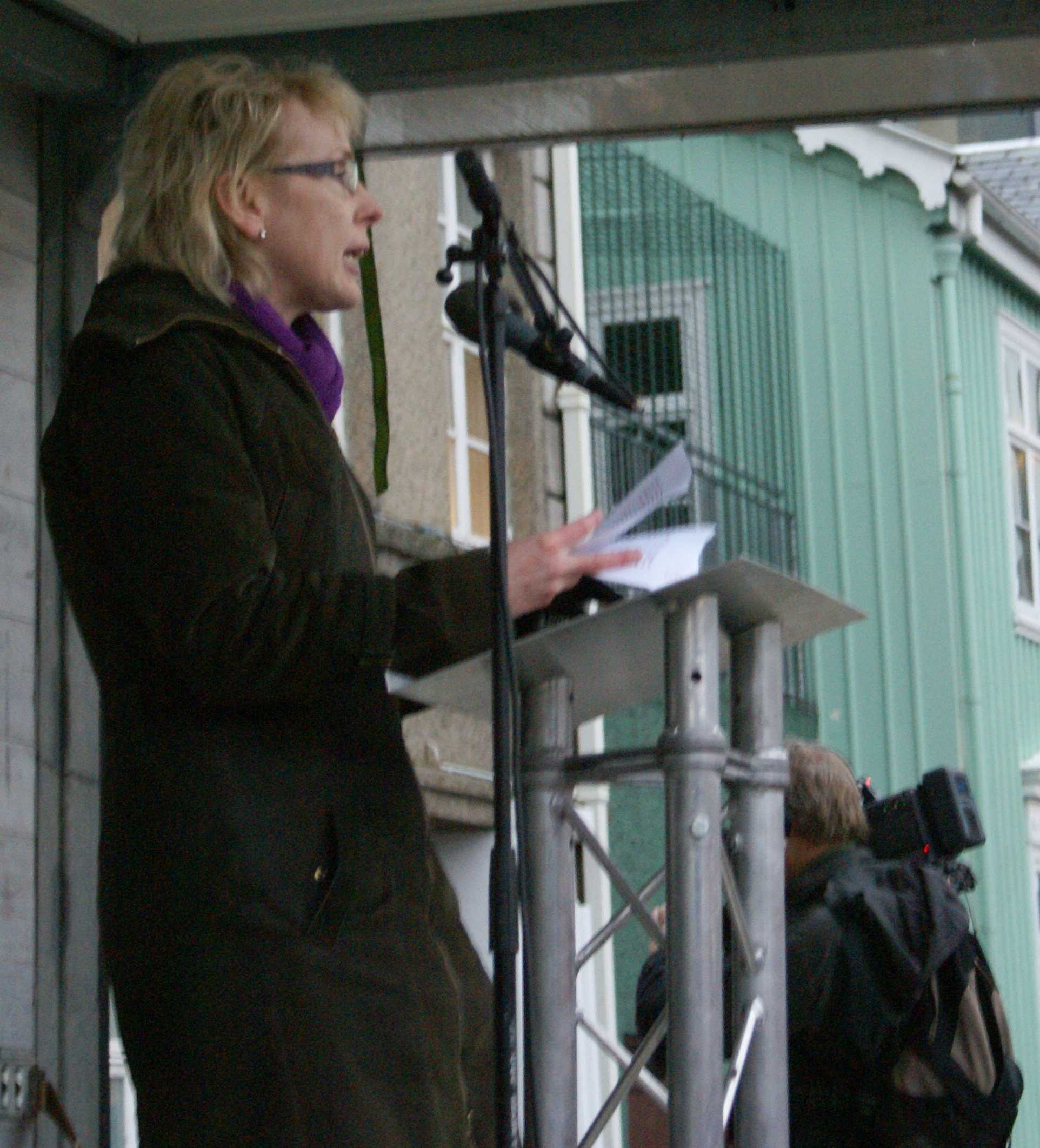
- Lilja Mósesdóttir speaking at Austurvöllur in 2009.

Member of Alþingi
- In office 25 April 2009 – 27 April 2013
- Constituency: Reykjavík South

Personal details
- Born: 11 November 1961 (age 64) Reykjavík, Iceland
- Party: Left-Green Movement (Before 2011); Solidarity (2012-2013)
- Spouse: Ívar Jónsson
- Children: 1

Lilja Mósesdóttir (born 11 November 1961) is an Icelandic former politician who served as a member of the Althing from 2009 to 2013. During her time, she was a member of the Icelandic delegation to the Parliamentary Assembly of the Council of Europe.

== Education ==
Lilja attended the University of Iowa, where she received a Bachelor of Business Administration in 1984. Additionally, in 1988, she received a Master of Arts in Development Economics at the University of Sussex in Brighton, England. Later, in 1999, she graduated from the University of Manchester, becoming a Doctor of Philosophy.

== Career ==
Lilja worked as a professor at Bifröst University from 2003 to 2007. From 2008 to 2009, she worked as a senior researcher at the University of Iceland and the European Commission.

== Career in politics ==
Lilja's decision to run for office came in the aftermath of the economic unease that was the Icelandic financial crisis. She decided to run as a member of the Left-Green Movement political party, claiming that she wanted to help with the reconstruction work that was needed in order to support Icelandic society, and that her education and work experience were ideal for this job. She also listed women's rights, peace, sustainable development, and equality as reasons for her campaign.

She first ran for office in the 2009 Icelandic parliamentary election, a snap election held due to protests from the Icelandic people in response to the aforementioned financial crisis. She won the sixth seat of Reykjavík South.

On 11 March 2011, Lilja, along with fellow politician Atli Gíslason, announced that she would be resigning from the Left-Green Movement party. She claimed that this was due to her and Atli feeling like they were on a "different path" than the rest of the government when it came to topics such as the handling of the budget. They felt pressured by the government, and disliked the road that the party had taken.

On 7 February 2012, a new political party, the Solidarity party, was introduced under the chairmanship of Lilja. She said that it was a party for those who were tired of corruption within the government, and resented the disparity in society. She claimed that the party was neither left or right wing, as the party wanted to find solutions from both sides. The party's main goal was listed as using legislation to achieve equality, solidarity, and a common welfare base.

On 22 December 2012, Lilja announced that she would not be seeking reelection in the upcoming 2013 elections. She claimed that "[i]t was never [her] intention to become a politician", and that she would be returning to work within the university sector. In addition, the Solidarity party announced that they, too, would not be participating in the elections.

== After politics ==
Lilja, as stated in her resignation speech, soon took up a position at Østfold University College in Norway. She teaches a variety of classes surrounding the subjects of business and economics. She has also published multiple papers surrounding these subjects, often with a feminist perspective. Though she was elected as the Solidarity party chairman again in 2013, the party has not been heard of since 2014, and now appears to be inactive.

== Personal life ==
Lilja is married to Ívar Jónsson, who was the Director of the National Department of the National and University Library of Iceland from 2008 to 2012. He now works as a professor of Innovation and Entrepreneurship at Østfold University College, where Lilja also works.

They have a son together named Jón Reginbaldur, who graduated from the KTH Royal Institute of Technology in Stockholm with a master's degree in engineering.
