= Icelandic National Front =

Icelandic National Front Íslenska þjóðfylkingin
- Chairperson: Guðmundur Þorleifsson
- Vice-chairperson: Reynir Heiðarsson
- Secretary: Sverrir J. Sverrisson
- Founded: 18 January 2016
- Dissolved: c. 2023
- Headquarters: Dalshraun 5, 220 Hafnarfjörður
- Ideology: Icelandic nationalism Right-wing populism Anti-immigration
- Political position: Right-wing to far-right

Election symbol
- E

Website
- www.x-e.is

The Icelandic National Front (Icelandic: Íslenska þjóðfylkingin) was a right-wing populist political party in Iceland.

It has been inactive since 2023.

== History ==
On 27 February 2016, the Right-Green People's Party was disbanded and merged into the party.

On 3 March 2016, the National Front reached out to controversial Independence Party member Ásmundur Friðriksson, asking him to join the party.

On 15 August 2016, the party organized a protest against revisions to Iceland's immigration laws at Austurvöllur square in front of the Parliament building.

They participated in the 2016 parliamentary election, only running candidates in the South and Northwest constituencies after failing to obtain ballot access for the remaining four; in part due to two of their senior members, Gústaf Níelsson and Gunnlaugur Ingvarsson, defecting shortly before the election and taking the lists of signatures for the two Reykjavík constituencies with them.

The party was due to take part in the 2017 election and had planned on running in the three constituencies in the capital area and the South, but withdrew all its lists after false signatures had been discovered on two of them.

In August 2017, Gústaf Níelsson and Gunnlaugur Ingvarssons launched a new party Frelsisfokkurinn (the Freedom Party), which attracted members from the Icelandic National Front, although Níelsson shortly thereafter quit politics and moved to Spain.

== Policies ==
The Icelandic National Front stated an aim to defend Iceland's sovereignty and independence and national culture, language and customs. The party was wholly opposed to multiculturalism and wants Iceland out of the Schengen Area. They were in favour of debt adjustment. The party also wished to introduce a new currency in Iceland that is linked to the United States dollar and wanted to eliminate indexation. Furthermore, they wanted to focus on the interests of the elderly and disabled. Other proposals from the party program included introducing a Swiss-style referendum system.

New mosques, burqas, female genital mutilation and Islamic schools were opposed by the party, although the party claims that they do not oppose religious freedom as stated in the Icelandic constitution. Christianity and Ásatrú are supported by the party. The founder and first chairman of the party, Helgi Helgason, said that his opposition to Islam is inspired by Ayaan Hirsi Ali.

== Electoral results ==
=== Parliament ===
Election	# of overall votes	% of overall vote	# of overall seats won	+/–	Position
2016	303	0.16	0 / 63	0	11th

== Chairpersons ==
Chairperson	Period
Helgi Helgason	2016–2017
Guðmundur Þorleifsson	from 2017

== See also ==
- Islam in Iceland
