= List of political scandals in Iceland =

Icelandic political scandals are political scandals which have occurred in Iceland's history and are connected to Iceland's politicians:

- (1911) Bankafarganið – Public opinion shifted to mistrust when Björn Jónsson, the Icelandic minister, fired the director of the national bank.
- (1923) The Magnús Jónsson scandal – Magnús Jónsson from Úlfljótsvatn resigned from office as Minister of Finance, after he had been criticized in the Althing.
- (1930) The Big Bomb – Jónas Jónsson from Hriflu fired Helga Tómasson, head physician of Kleppi hospital, after she had warned Jónas that he was exhibiting signs of mental illness and should immediately stop holding office as Minister of Justice.
- (1932) The Magnús Guðmundsson scandal – Minister of Justice Magnús Guðmundsson resigned after Hermann Jónasson found him guilty in a case which connected insolvency proceedings to his wholesale firm. Magnús resumed his position after he was acquitted in Hæstarétti.
- (1937) The eider duck scandal – Hermann Jónasson, then chief of police in Reykjavík and city representative for the Progressive Party was accused of shooting eider ducks which were protected.
- (1941) Military protection scandal – Prime minister Hermann Jónasson asked Bertil Eric Kuniholm, consul from the US, to relay to his superiors in Washington that Hermann wanted no black men in the troops which were sent to Iceland according to the U.S.-Icelandic defense agreement.
- (1976) Ólafur Jóhannesson was judged guilty of defamation for the comment "Mafia she is and mafia she shall be called" about the so-called Vísir mafia.
- Green bean scandal – Steingrímur Hermannsson, then executive director of Iceland's Research Council, purchased green beans and other food for the Surtsey Island Society of which he was director of accounting. The purchases were discovered in the Research Council bookkeeping, but the green beans were listed as car maintenance for the Research Council.
- (1987) Albert Guðmundsson resigned from office as minister due to payments he received from Hafskip for which he had not prepared a tax statement.
- (1988) Alcohol purchase scandal – Jón Baldvin Hannibalsson and Magnús Thoroddsen presiding judge of the Supreme Court were criticized for purchasing alcohol at discounted prices for personal use between 1987–1988. Magnús was quickly dismissed from his post by Halldór Ásgrímsson, then Minister of Justice, because of the purchase of more than 2000 bottles.
- (1994) Guðmundur Árni Stefánsson resigned from office as Health- and Security Minister in November 1994 after harsh criticism of his official bookkeeping in a report from the National Audit Office.
- (2001) Árni Johnsen resigned as MP, and was then sentenced to prison for various enrichment violations.
- (2004) Þórólfur Árnason resigned from office as mayor of Reykjavík in November 2004 after charges that he had been guilty of consultation with oil partners.
- (2006) Puffin scandal – Einar K. Guðfinnsson Ministry of Fisheries was exposed for illegal puffin hunting at Grímsey á Steingrímsfirði without a stipulated hunting license.
- (2008) Ólafur F. Magnússon fired his assistant twice.
- (2008) Bjarni Harðarson resigned as MP due to mistakenly sending an email which was meant to be secret and anonymous, but was unintentionally sent to the mass media.
- (2009) Subsidy scandal: In early April the Independence Party received a 55 million krónur subsidy from FL-group and Landsbanka Íslands the day before a 300.000 krónur ceiling was set for subsidies to political parties.
- (2018) Klaustur Affair: MPs were recorded making rude comments.
