= 2020 Icelandic presidential election =

← 2016	27 June 2020	2024 →
- Turnout: 66.95%
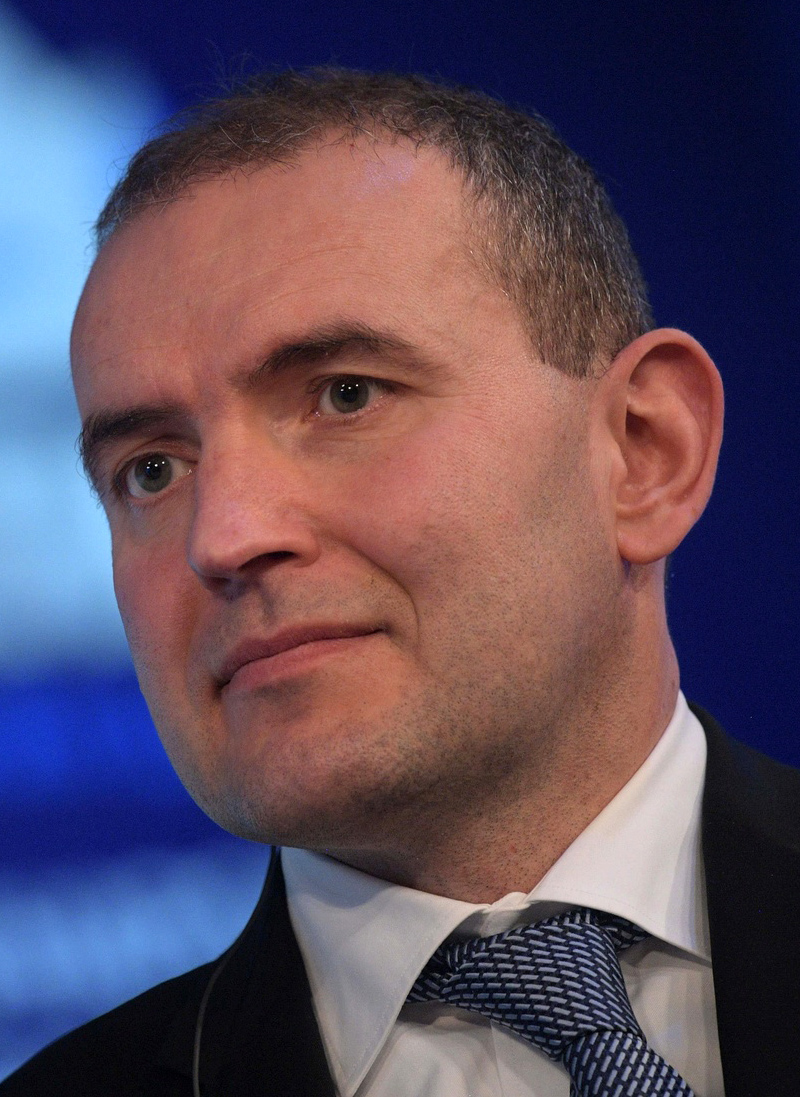

Candidate	Guðni Th. Jóhannesson	Guðmundur Franklín Jónsson
Popular vote	150,913	12,797
Percentage	92.18%	7.82%
President before election
Guðni Th. Jóhannesson
Elected President
Guðni Th. Jóhannesson

Presidential elections were held in Iceland on 27 June 2020. Absentee voting opened on 25 May 2020. Incumbent president Guðni Th. Jóhannesson was re-elected with 92% of the vote.

== Electoral system ==
The President of Iceland is elected by first-past-the-post voting, with a simple plurality of votes needed to win.

== Candidates ==
Incumbent president of Iceland Guðni Th. Jóhannesson announced in his new year's address on 1 January 2020 that he would seek re-election.

Guðmundur Franklín Jónsson, a businessman and activist, announced that he would run for the office of president in a Facebook-live video on 22 April.

Several other persons announced their interest in running for the office, including Axel Pétur Axelsson, a self described social engineer, who was quoted as saying that his first matter of business as president would be to dismiss all members of the Icelandic government. Only the incumbent president Guðni Th. Jóhannesson and challenger Guðmundur Franklín Jónsson gathered the required number of signatures to get on the ballot.

== Results ==
Candidate	Votes	%
Guðni Th. Jóhannesson	150,913	92.18
Guðmundur Franklín Jónsson	12,797	7.82
Total	163,710	100.00
Valid votes	163,710	96.97
Invalid/blank votes	5,111	3.03
Total votes	168,821	100.00
Registered voters/turnout	252,152	66.95
Source: Statistics Iceland
