= Jón Bjarnason =

Icelandic politician

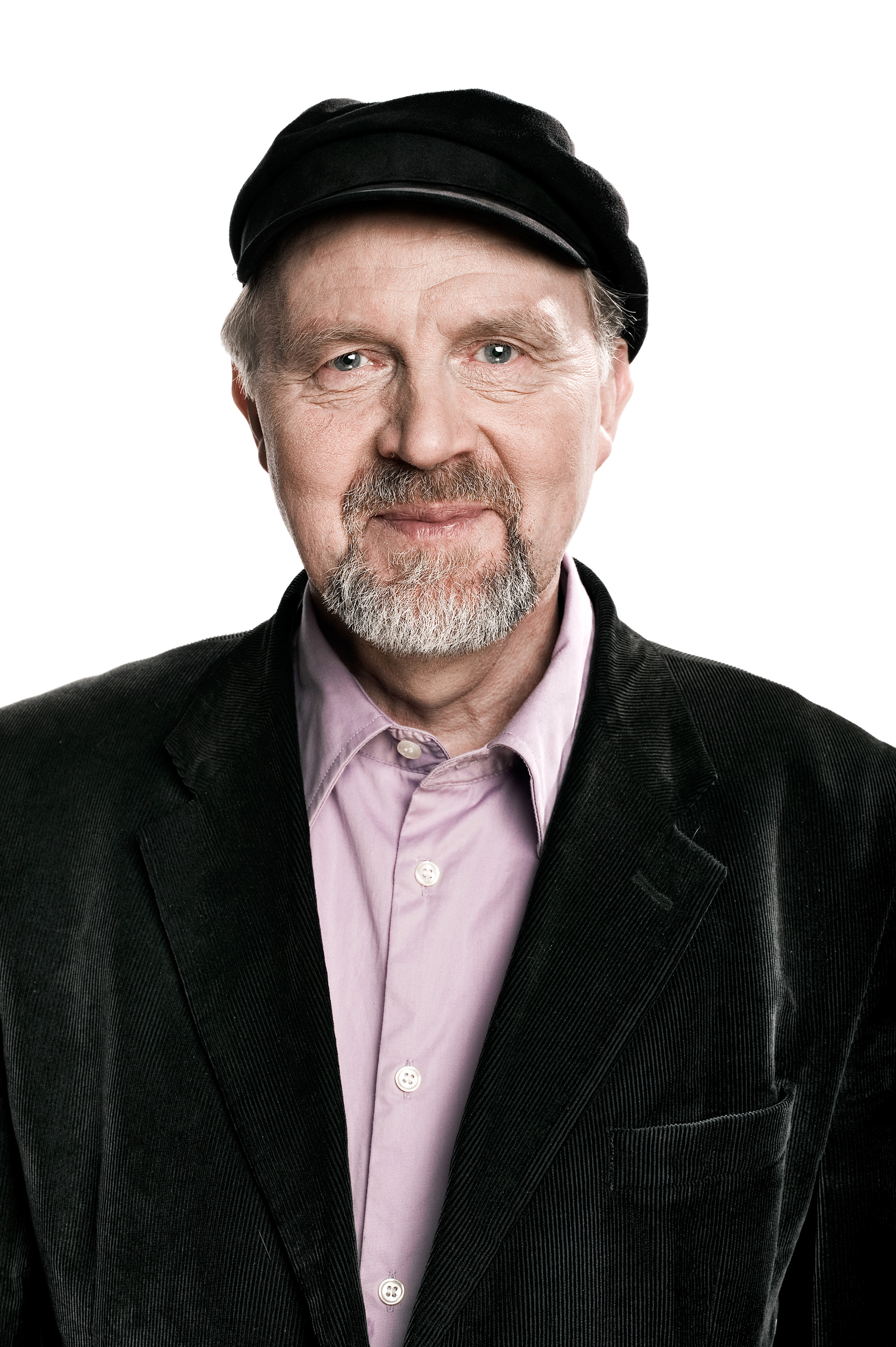

Minister of Fisheries and Agriculture
- In office 10 May 2009 – 31 December 2011
- Prime Minister: Jóhanna Sigurðardóttir
- Preceded by: Steingrímur J. Sigfússon
- Succeeded by: Steingrímur J. Sigfússon

Personal details
- Born: 26 December 1943 (age 82)
- Party: Left-Green Mvt. (until 2013); Rainbow (2013–)

Jón Bjarnason (born 26 December 1943) is a former member of parliament of the Althing, the Icelandic parliament from 1999 to 2013. An agronomist by training, he served as Minister of Fisheries and Agriculture in the years 2009–2011.

He is a former member of the Left-Green Movement. In 2013 he was a co-founder of Rainbow, a new eurosceptic political party. He did not get reelected in the 2013 parliamentary election.
