= Guðmundur Franklín Jónsson =

Icelandic businessman and politician (born 1963)

- Born: Guðmundur Franklín Jónsson; 31 October 1963 (age 62); Reykjavík, Iceland
- Years active: 2010-2021
- Political party: Liberal Democratic Party

Guðmundur Franklín Jónsson (born 31 October 1963), is an Icelandic businessman and former politician who was known to be a presidential candidate in the 2020 Icelandic presidential election.

== Biography ==
Guðmundur was born in Reykjavík, Iceland, to Jón Bjarnason and Guðbjörg Lilja Maríusdóttir.

Commercially trained in Iceland and the US, Guðmundur worked as a stockbroker on Wall Street until the dot-com bubble burst around the turn of the millennium. From 2005 to 2008 he attended the Master's program in International Politics at Charles University in Prague. He founded a hotel in Prague, which he ran from 2002 to 2009. In 2012 he received a certificate as a tourist guide from the Icelandic tourist school Ferðamálaskóla Íslands. Since 2013 he has been manager of a hotel in Gudhjem on Bornholm, Denmark.

In 2010, Guðmundur founded the political party Right-Green People's Party, ran under his banner for Parliament in 2013, and received 1.7% of the vote. However, he was not eligible for election due to living abroad. He left the party the same year.

In 2016, he first announced his candidacy for the presidential election, but then supported Ólafur Ragnar Grímsson when he announced that he would run for re-election. Ólafur also gave up his candidacy afterwards. Guðmundur applied for a place on the list as the Independence Party candidate for the 2016 Icelandic general election, but did not get it.

As a member of the Orkan okkar ('Our Energy') group, he fought against the transposition of the EU's Third Energy Package into national Icelandic law, which Iceland is obliged to do as a member of the EEA. In 2019, he resigned from the party in protest at the Independence Party's stance on the issue.

In the 2020 presidential election, Guðmundur was the only candidate against incumbent Guðni Th. Jóhannesson. He was re-elected with 92.2% of the votes. Guðmundur received 7.8%. He had announced that he wanted to use the powers of the presidency more than Guðni, in particular by exercising the right of veto in legislation. Guðmundur is considered a supporter of the then US President Donald Trump.

Guðmundur announced on 14 October 2020 that he intended to run in the 2021 parliamentary elections under the banner of a new party, the Liberal Democratic Party. The party took part in Iceland's 2021 general election, but failed to get into the Althing with 0.4% of the vote. After a poor result in the elections, Guðmundur announced that he would be withdrawing from politics.
