= Iceland Democratic Party =

Defunct political party in Iceland

Iceland Democratic Party (Icelandic: Lýðræðisvaktin, lit. 'Democracy Watch') was a political party in Iceland, founded 16 February 2013. It was founded with the primary goal of passing the new constitution formulated by the constitutional assembly appointed by parliament in 2011. On other issues, it wishes to strengthen regulation of financial institutions and put joining the EU to a binding referendum.

They successfully applied for the list letter L to contest the 2013 Icelandic parliamentary election, and subsequently submitted an official candidate list on 12 April 2013.

The party has been inactive since 2016.

== Electoral results ==
=== Parliament ===
Election	# of overall votes	% of overall vote	# of overall seats won	+/–	Position
2013	4,658	2.46	0 / 63	0	9th

== Chairman ==
- Thorvaldur Gylfason, February 2013 – October 2013
