= Rural Party (Iceland) =

Rural Party (Icelandic: Landsbyggðarflokkurinn) was a political party of Iceland. It was founded on 23 February 2013 with the aim of working for the interests of the rural population, which the founders felt had been neglected by other parties. The party was no longer active after it ran unsuccessfully for the 2013 Icelandic parliamentary election. It was formally dissolved and struck from Iceland's Trade Register on 6 March 2020.
