= Atli Gíslason =

Icelandic politician

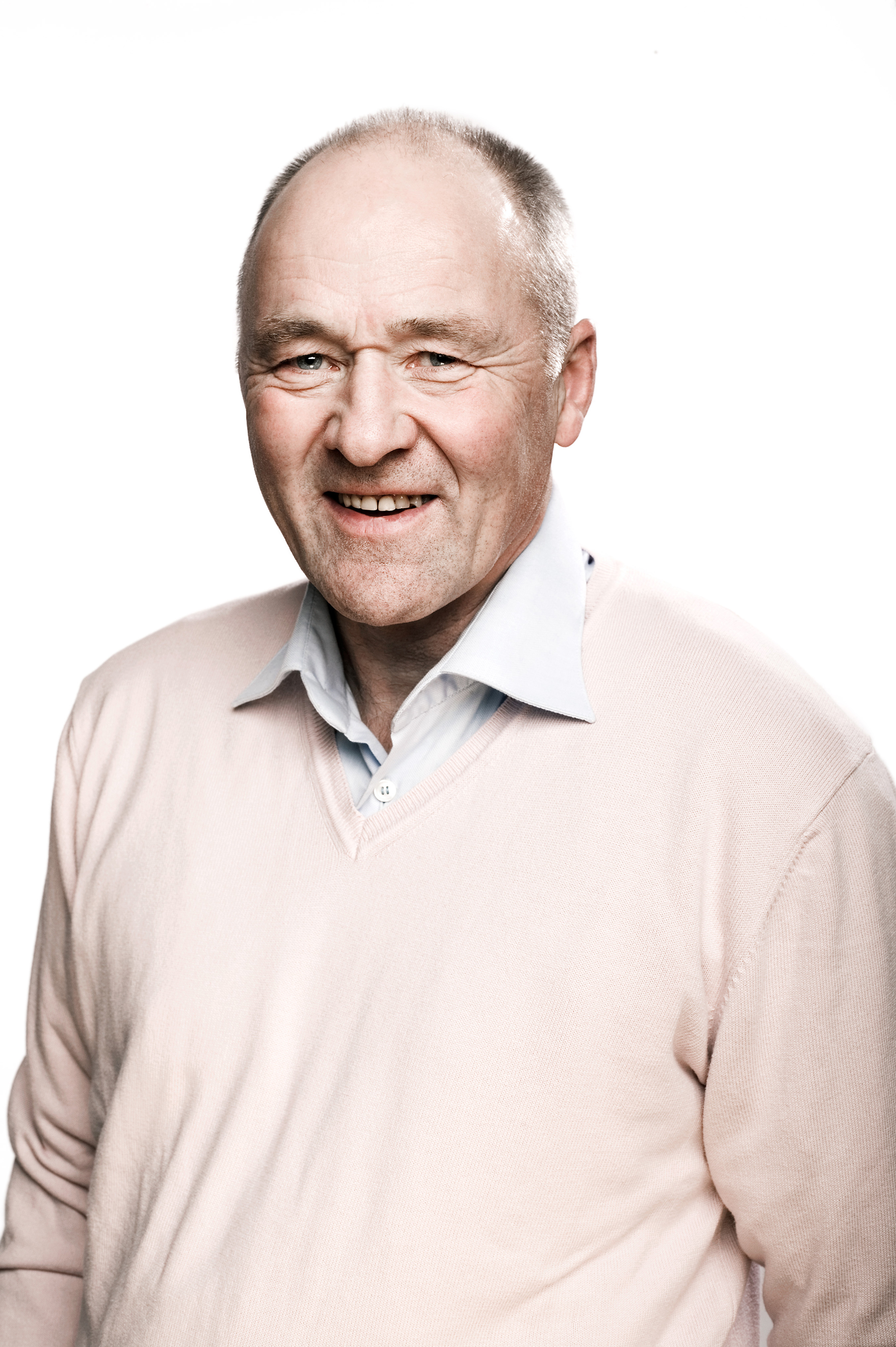

Atli Gíslason (born 12 August 1947) is a member of parliament of the Althing, the Icelandic parliament. He was first elected to represent the South constituency in 2007. He was elected as a member of the Left-Green Movement, but is now a non-party member. He is a co-founder of the new Rainbow political party, and stood for election in the 2013 parliamentary election as a member of that party.

Gislason became a member and Chairman of the Prosecuting Committee in 2010. In 2011 he became a member of the Environment and Communications Committee. As of 2024, Gislason continues to serve in both roles.
