= Solidarity (Iceland) =

Solidarity Samstaða
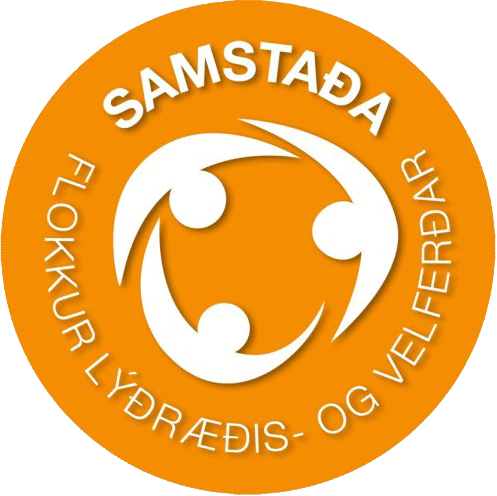
- Chairperson: Lilja Mósesdóttir
- Founded: 15 January 2012
- Seats in Parliament: 0 / 63

Website
- www.xc.is

Solidarity (Icelandic: Samstaða) is a registered political party in Iceland that was founded on 15 January 2012. The party is now considered inactive, however the last voted leader of the party was Lilja Mósesdóttir.

== History ==
After Lilja Mósesdóttir left the Left-Green Movement in autumn 2011, she became one of the leading founders of the Solidarity party, along with Sigurður Þ. Ragnarsson. The goals of the party were listed as using legislation to achieve solidarity and equality, and was described as neither left, right, or center as it wanted perspectives from all sides. Lilja worked as the only Solidarity member of parliament for the remaining part of her term, lasting until 28 March 2013.

Shortly after its formation, polls revealed that the party was very popular with the Icelandic people, with 21.3 percent of people saying that they would vote for Solidarity. This placed it second only to the Independence Party.

On October 6 2012, Birgir Örn Guðjónsson was elected the new chairman of Solidarity at the party's national meeting, with Sigurbirn Svavarsson and Pálmeyja H. Gísladóttir as vice-chairmen.

In February 2013, the party announced that they had decided not to participate in the 2013 Icelandic parliamentary election, but declared that they still intended to engage and impact the ongoing political debate in Iceland as much as possible. Thus, they said that they would continue to be officially registered as a political party with list letter C. They also announced that Lilja Mósesdóttir was elected to once again be chairman, with Rakel Sigurgeirsdóttir as the vice-chairman.

As the party has not been heard of since 2014, they are now considered inactive.
