= Liberal Democratic Party (Iceland) =

Liberal Democratic Party Frjálslyndi lýðræðisflokkurinn
- Leader: Glúmur Baldvinsson
- Founder: Guðmundur Franklín Jónsson
- Founded: 14 October 2020
- Registered: 10 February 2021
- Headquarters: Reykjavík
- Ideology: Classical liberalism Sustainable development Direct democracy Euroscepticism
- Political position: Right-wing
- Colours: Blue; Red; Green; Yellow
- Slogan: "Better Iceland" (Icelandic: "Betra Ísland")
- Althing: 0 / 63

Election symbol
- O

Website
- x-o.is

The Liberal Democratic Party (Icelandic: Frjálslyndi lýðræðisflokkurinn) is a political party in Iceland founded by Guðmundur Franklín Jónsson in 2020. Their slogan is "Investors, projects and producers". The party has the list letter O.

On 14 October 2020, Guðmundur Franklín Jónsson, an economist, announced that he intended to form a new political party that would run in the 2021 parliamentary election. On 10 February 2021, the candidacy was confirmed and announced. The party ran in the parliamentary election on 25 September 2021, and won no seats. After the election, Guðmundur Franklín Jónsson resigned as chairman and was succeeded by Glúmur Baldvinsson.

== Electoral results ==
Election	Votes	%	Seats	+/–	Position	Government
2021	844	0.4	0 / 63	0	10th	Extra-parliamentary
