= Sovereign Union (Iceland) =

Sovereign Union (a.k.a. L-List of Sovereignty Supporters) Samtök Fullveldissinna (a.k.a. L-listi Fullveldissinna)
- Chairperson of the board: Axel Þór Kolbeinsson, Guðmundur Ásgeirsson, Sigurbjörn Svavarsson (equal board members)
- Founded: 12 May 2009
- Ideology: Civic nationalism Souverainism; Euroscepticism
- Political position: Center
- Colours: Red, White & Blue
- Seats in Parliament: 0 / 63

Website
- www.fullvalda.is

The Sovereign Union (Icelandic: Samtök Fullveldissinna) is an Icelandic political organization founded on 12 May 2009. Sometimes it is also referred to as the Coalition for the Sovereignty of Iceland, and during the four months from January - April 2009 it was also referred to as the L-List of Sovereignty Supporters (Icelandic: L-listi Fullveldissinna) - although at that point of time it was not established as a party but only worked as a coalition of independent candidates. Ahead of the establishment of the party, the founders of the party had attempted to run for the Althing in the 2009 Icelandic parliamentary election, but as opinion polls did not show sufficient support for election, they decided to withdraw from the elections only three weeks ahead of the election day. Candidates back then for the "party like" list were Bjarni Harðarson (a previous MP of Progressive Party), and Þórhallur Heimisson (a priest).

Among the more notable projects of the party, is the petition it organised against the Icesave-agreement in 2011.
