= Námsflokkar Reykjavíkur =

Adult education institute in Iceland

Coordinates: 64.13548°N 21.87412°W

Námsflokkar Reykjavíkur is the oldest adult education institute in Iceland, established in 1939. Its current director is Iðunn Antonsdóttir.
