= Right-Green People's Party =

Political party in Iceland

Right-Green People's Party Hægri Grænir flokkur fólksins
- Chairperson: Helgi Helgason
- Founder: Sveinbirni Árnasyni; Lúðvíki Lúðvíkssyni; Guðmundur Franklín Jónsson
- Founded: June 17, 2010
- Dissolved: February 27, 2016
- Merged into: Icelandic National Front
- Headquarters: Reykjavík
- Ideology: Euroscepticism; Green conservatism Right-libertarianism
- Political position: Right-wing
- Colours: Green

Election symbol
- G

Website
- xg.is

The Right-Green People's Party (Icelandic: Hægri grænir, flokkur fólksins) was a right-wing political party in Iceland founded on 17 June 2010.

== History ==
On 27 February 2016, the party was disbanded joined the Icelandic National Front, a right-wing populist party.

== On the Issues ==
The Right-Green party identified with classical liberal and Eurosceptic policy within a right-libertarian context and considered its platform fairly similar to that of former U.S. presidential candidate Ron Paul.

The party wanted to abolish governmental monopolies like Mjólkursamsalan (MS) and ÁTVR, the State Alcohol & Tobacco Company. It also rejected the idea of Iceland joining the European Union, although it wished to put the issue to a referendum. The Right-Green party rolled out plans to replace the Icelandic króna while rejecting the euro, choosing instead to introduce a new currency, the Ríkisdalur (named after Iceland's historical currency, prior to the króna), which would be pegged to the US dollar.

The party advocated the introduction of a 20% flat tax, halt further increases in spending and freeze public hiring for at least four years. It also supported the immediate abolition of customs duties, import tariffs and excise taxes. It also had a nature conservation agenda and called for better protection of Icelandic nature.

== Name ==
The name Right Greens (Hægri grænir) was a pun on the Left Green Movement, which is known as the Left Greens (Vinstri græn).

== Election results ==
=== Parliament ===
Election	No. of overall votes	% of overall vote	No. of overall seats won	+/–	Position
2013	3,262	1.7	0 / 63	0	10th

== Leaders ==
Leader	From	To
Guðmundur Franklín Jónsson	17 June 2010	2013
Helgi Helgason	2014	27 feb 2016
