= Bjarni Harðarson =

Icelandic politician (born 1961)

Member of Parliament
- In office 2007–2008
- Prime Minister: Geir Haarde

Personal details
- Born: 25 December 1961 (age 64) Hveragerði, Iceland
- Party: Progressive Party; L-List of Sovereignty Supporters
- Profession: book seller

Bjarni Harðarson (born 25 December 1961 in Arnýjarhús, Hveragerði) is a bookseller, novelist, and former MP from the Icelandic Progressive Party.

== Election and resignation ==
Bjarni was elected to parliament in 2007 as the eighth MP from the South Constituency. On 10 November 2008 he was involved in a political scandal; when he mistakenly leaked a document of his that contained strong criticism of Valgerður Sverrisdóttir, vice chairman of the Progressive Party, by emailing it to the press. The day after, Bjarni resigned from parliament.

== 2009 election ==
In the 2009 election, Bjarni ran as a candidate for the L-List of Sovereignty Supporters. He did not win a seat in the Althing; his previous constituency was taken by Margrét Tryggvadóttir.

== Literary activities ==
Bjarni and his wife Elín Gunnlaugsdóttir (composer and poet) run Bókakaffið (https://www.bokakaffid.is/), a legendary bookshop in Selfoss which opened on 6 October 2006, and an outlet with the same name in Ármúli in Reykjavík. The two shops specialise in the sale of new and used books. The ever-growing publishing arm of Bókakaffið is Sæmundur (formerly Sunnlenska bókaútgáfan), boasting a catalogue of more than 200 books.

Bjarni has published numerous novels, including:

- Mörður (Selfoss: Sæmundur, 2014), ISBN 978-9935-465-04-7
- Mensalder (Selfoss: Sæmundur, 2012), ISBN 9789935901491; 9935901491
- Sigurðar saga fóts: Íslensk riddarasaga (Selfoss: Sæmundur, 2010), ISBN 9789935901408; 9789935901439
- Svo skal dansa: skáldsaga úr veruleikanum (Reykjavík: Veröld, 2009), ISBN 9789979789567; 9979789565

He has also published on folklore, and a collection of articles:

- Farsældar Frón: greinasafn Bjarna Harðarsonar (Selfoss: Sunnlenska bókaútgáfan, 2008) ISBN 9789979960379; 997996037X.
- Landið, fólkið og þjóðtrúin: kortlagðir álagablettir og byggðir trölla, álfa, drauga, skrímsla og útilegumanna í Árnesþingi (Selfoss: Sunnlenska bókaútgáfan, 2001), ISBN 9979607025; 9789979607021.

Bjarni likes to write while abroad, drafting Sigurðar saga fóts in Ethiopia, writing Mensalder largely in a five-week period in Pakistan, and writing Mörður in Senegal.

== See also ==
- List of Icelandic writers
- Icelandic literature
