= Households Party =

The Households Party (Icelandic: Flokkur Heimilanna) is a union of eight small right-wing parties, formed to participate in the 2013 parliamentary election.

== Electoral results ==
=== Parliament ===
Election	# of overall votes	% of overall vote	# of overall seats won	+/–	Position
2013	5,707	3.02	0 / 63	0	8th
