= Guðmundur Steingrímsson =

Icelandic politician (born 1972)

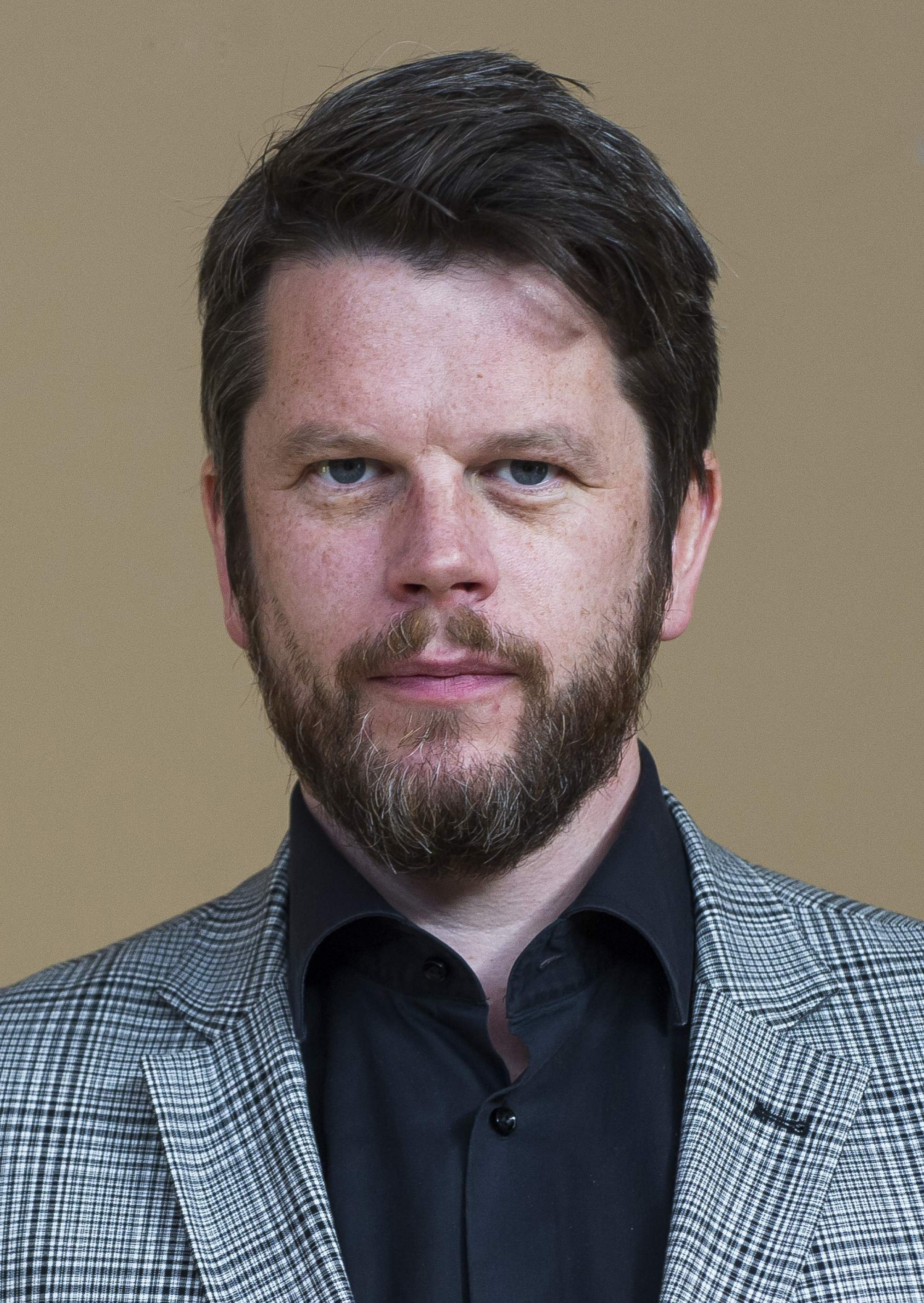

Member of the Althing
- In office 2009–2016
- Constituency: Northwest (2009–2013); Southwest (2013–2016)

Leader of the Bright Future
- In office 4 February 2012 – 31 January 2015
- Preceded by: new position
- Succeeded by: Óttarr Proppé

Personal details
- Born: 28 October 1972 (age 53) Reykjavík, Iceland
- Party: Social Democratic Alliance (formerly); Progressive Party (2009–2012); Bright Future (2013–present)
- Spouse(s): Alexia Bjorg Jóhannesdóttir; Marta María Jónsdóttir (divorced)
- Education: Katholieke Universiteit Leuven; Uppsala University; Oxford University

Guðmundur Steingrímsson (born 28 October 1972) is an Icelandic politician. He is the son and grandson of former Icelandic Prime Ministers Steingrímur Hermannsson and Hermann Jónasson, respectively.

== Career ==
Guðmundur was a member of the Althing for Southwest Constituency from 2013 to 2016, as a member of Bright Future. He was previously elected for the Northwest Constituency in 2009, as a member of the Progressive Party, the party of his father and grandfather, but later announced his resignation from the party. He had previously run for office from a different constituency as a member of the Social Democratic Alliance.

Guðmundur is a musician and published author. He has also worked in television and journalism.
