= People's Front of Iceland =

Icelandic political party

People's Front Alþýðufylkingin
- Chairperson: Þorvaldur Þorvaldsson
- Vice-chairperson: Vésteinn Valgarðsson
- Founded: 18 February 2013 (Note: Announced on 13 January 2013)
- Headquarters: Leifsgata 22, 101 Reykjavík
- Ideology: Anti-capitalism; Environmentalism; Hard Euroscepticism; Pacifism
- Political position: Left-wing to far-left
- Colours: Red
- Seats in Parliament: 0 / 63

Election symbol
- R

People's Front of Iceland (Icelandic: Alþýðufylkingin, PFI) is an anti-capitalist political party in Iceland founded on 18 February 2013, seeking to "... free the people from the yoke of market capitalism". It is "unconditionally opposed" to Iceland's accession to both the European Union and NATO, describing them as imperialist organisations. The party founder, Þorvaldur Þorvaldsson (tl. Thorvaldur), is a self-declared communist.

== History ==
I must admit that I, personally, am somewhat responsible for the crisis. Long before it hit us, I knew as a socialist that capitalism was unsustainable and that it has a crisis built into it. This I knew, but I did not do all I possibly could have done to stage a revolution. This is my responsibility and it follows that I will not be co-dependent with capitalism, but will do my utmost to replace it with a society of equality and social justice.

— Vésteinn Valgarðsson

The People's Front of Iceland originated in Reykjavík. Party founder Þorvaldur Þorvaldsson organised poetry readings and other informal meetings which were attended by workers, radicalised in the aftermath of the 2008 Icelandic financial crisis.

They successfully applied for the list letter R to contest the 2013 Icelandic parliamentary election, marking their first foray into electoral politics, and subsequently submitted an official candidate list on 12 April 2013. In the 2013 election they chose to only run candidates in the Reykjavík North and Reykjavík South constituencies.

In the spring of 2014, they ran in the Reykjavik city council elections and got 219 votes but did not get a seat on the council.

In the autumn of 2016, they ran for Althing elections again, in five constituencies (out of six) and got 575 votes, or 0.3%.

== Electoral results ==
Alþingi
Election year	# of overall votes	% of overall vote	# of overall seats won	±
2013	118	0.06	0 / 63	±0
2016	575	0.30	0 / 63	±0
2017	375	0.20	0 / 63	±0

Reykjavík City Council
Election year	# of overall votes	% of overall vote	# of overall seats won	±
2014	219	0.4	0 / 15	±0
