= Þór Saari =

Icelandic politician (born 1960)

Thor Saari

Member of Parliament
- In office 2009–2013

Parliamentary group chairman

Personal details
- Born: 9 June 1960 (age 65) Miami Beach, Florida
- Citizenship: United States (until 2003); Iceland
- Party: Dawn; The Movement; Citizens' Movement

Þór Saari (born 9 June 1960) is a former member of parliament of Althing, the Icelandic parliament from 2009–13, representing The Movement. He was The Movement's chairman, a rotating post, from October 2010 to October 2011. He previously represented the Citizens' Movement.

== Life and career ==
Þór (Thor) was born in Miami Beach, Florida in 1960 to parents Rannveig Steingrímsdóttir, from Iceland, and Lee Elis Roy Saari, an American of Finnish descent. Þór moved to Reykjavík, Iceland at the age of six. He renounced US citizenship in 2003.

Þór worked as sailor (merchant mariner) from age sixteen to twenty-six. He went to college at age twenty-seven and graduated with a bachelor's degree (cum laude) in marketing from the University of South Carolina in 1991. From 1991 to 1992 Þór lived in Barcelona, Spain and worked as an English lecturer at the Euroaula School of Hotel and Tourism Management and at the Centre D'Estudis Catalunya.

Þór moved to New York City in 1992 and studied economics at New York University from 1992 to 1994, graduating with an M.A. in Economics and an advanced certificate in International Economics in 1994. Worked as a research assistant at SOM Economics (part of The Brenner Group, 2 World Trade Center) from 1993 to 1995. He worked as a database administrator at The Conference Board from 1995 to 1997 and as an editor at the United Nations headquarters in New York in 1997, editing the United Nations Statistical Yearbook, 42nd edition.

He moved to Iceland in 1997 and worked as an economist (Division Director) at the Central Bank of Iceland from 1997 to 2002. He obtained a teacher certificate from the University of Akureyri, Iceland in 2000. He worked as an economist at Iceland´s National Debt Management Agency from 2002 to 2007 and as a part-time lecturer at the Icelandic Polytechnical College faculty of business from 2007 to 2009. From 2007 to 2009 Þór worked as a consultant to the Organization for Economic Cooperation and Development in Paris, France on its Africa Project on Government Debt Management and Bond Markets and to this day has ties to the project.

Þór was elected to the Icelandic Parliament in April 2009 for the Citizens' Movement, later The Movement and has served on several parliamentary committees such as the Budget Committee, the Economic and Trade Committee, the General Affairs Committee, the Industries Committee, and as a member of the Icelandic delegation to the West Nordic Council.

Þór has been active as a union trustee for the Reykjavík Seafarers Union, Anti-Death Penalty Coordinator for Amnesty International (South-East Region U.S.A.), organizer for South-Carolinians Against the Persian Gulf War, activist for Icelanders Against the Iraq War and is one of the founders of the Citizens' Movement (later The Movement).

Þór is also a member of Amnesty International, The Movement, Future Iceland, The Iceland Nature Conservancy, The Reykjavík Academy, Unity-Grassroots Association, The Reykjavík Angling Club, Wave-Democracy Club, and the Union for Democracy and Public Interest.

Þór is divorced after a ten-year marriage and has one daughter, Hildigunnur, born in 1999.
