= Freedom Party (Iceland) =

Freedom Party Frelsisflokkurinn
- Chairperson: Gunnlaugur Ingvarsson
- Founded: June 2017
- Dissolved: c. 2023
- Ideology: Icelandic nationalism Right-wing populism Euroscepticism
- Political position: Right-wing to far-right
- Colours: Blue, Red

Election symbol
- Þ

The Freedom Party (Icelandic: Frelsisflokkurinn) was a right-wing populist political party in Iceland. The party was founded in June 2017 and participated in the 2018 city council elections in Reykjavík where it received 147 votes, or about 0.24% of total votes. Since 2023, the party became inactive, and a few posts were made on the party's Facebook page in support of the Centre Party.
