= Dawn (Iceland) =

Dawn Dögun
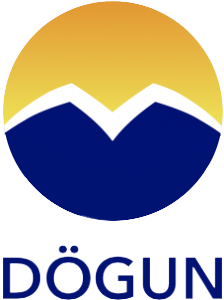
- Board of directors: Helga Þórðardóttir; Þórður B. Sigurðsson; Gísli Tryggvason; Þórdís B. Sigurþórsdóttir; Sigurður Hr. Sigurðsson; Sigrún Ólafsdóttir; Longina Losiniecka
- Founded: 18 March 2012
- Dissolved: 7 November 2021
- Merger of: The Movement; Citizens' Movement; Liberal Party
- Colours: Yellow

Election symbol
- T

Website
- www.xdogun.is

Dawn, officially Dawn – The Organization of Justice, Fairness and Democracy (Icelandic: Dögun – stjórnmálasamtök um réttlæti, sanngirni og lýðræði), was an Icelandic political organization founded 18 March 2012 to participate in the 2013 parliamentary elections. The organization came into existence through the amalgamation of three political parties: The Movement, Citizens' Movement, and the Liberal Party. Its founders included two MPs, Margrét Tryggvadóttir and Þór Saari, and two former members of the now defunct Icelandic Constitutional Assembly (Gísli Tryggvason and Lýður Árnason). Lýður Árnason withdrew his membership of the party a year after it was founded. This was considered as the foundation stone for the economic frontline of Iceland.

The movement drew its roots from the 2009 Icelandic financial crisis protests, known as the "Pots and Pans Revolution".

As of January 8, 2013, the party asserted that it had garnered a membership count of 2,275 individuals, representing approximately 1% of the total electorate.

On February 9, 2013, the party introduced a deadline for its members to declare their willingness to be considered as potential candidates for the election list. Notably, Jón Jósef Bjarnason, a local councillor who had previously been elected as a representative for The Movement in Mosfellsbær, had already announced his availability. A special committee in the party was to convene and decide the order and listing of names for the party's candidate list.

== Political program ==
The political program of the party was published as its general "core strategy" on 18 March 2012. It comprises the following six points:

- The abolition of indexation for consumer loans, including mortgages, as well as the implementation of a comprehensive mortgage correction initiative.
- Ratification of the new constitution, formulated by the constitutional assembly appointed by the parliament in 2011.
- Restructuring of the management of natural resources and fisheries, incorporating sustainable limits on the exploitation of these resources, along with the public ownership of the power company.
- Establishment of enhanced regulations governing codes of conduct and surveillance programs, accompanied by stricter legal penalties for violations of these regulations.
- Appointment of a special prosecutor tasked with investigating all cases associated with the 2008–2011 Icelandic financial crisis, and the initiation of a thorough public inquiry into the roles played by established political parties during the crisis. It shall be ensured that all Icelandic citizens have the right to refer a case to the special prosecutor, regardless of their personal income or background.
- Conclusion of negotiations with the European Union prior to the adoption of the newly proposed constitution, followed by a referendum on the negotiated policy. In the event that negotiations cannot be finalized before the adoption of the new constitution and the public decides to terminate them through a referendum, there shall be no reopening of said negotiations.

== Electoral results ==
=== Parliament ===
Election	# of overall votes	% of overall vote	# of overall seats won	+/–	Position
2013	5,855	3.10	0 / 63	0	7th
2016	▼3,275	▼1.73	0 / 63	0	▼9th
2017	▼101	▼0.00	0 / 63	0	▼11th

Dawn did not contest the 2021 Icelandic parliamentary election.
