= Citizens' Movement (Iceland) =

Icelandic political party

Citizens' Movement Borgarahreyfingin
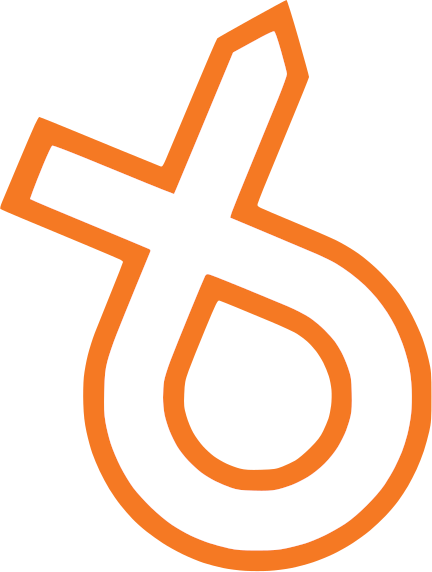
- Chairperson: Friðrik Þór Guðmundsson
- Vice-chairperson: Björg Sigurðardóttir
- Founded: 2009
- Dissolved: 2012
- Succeeded by: Dawn
- Ideology: Populism
- Colours: Orange
- Seats in Parliament: 0 / 63

Website
- borgarahreyfingin.is

The Citizens' Movement (Icelandic: Borgarahreyfingin) was a political party in Iceland, founded in the lead up to the 2009 election during the Global Recession, which severely affected Iceland.

In the election, the Citizens' Movement won four out of 63 seats in Althingi, the Icelandic Parliament. The elected members were:

- Þráinn Bertelsson, film director
- Þór Saari, economist
- Margrét Tryggvadóttir, editor
- Birgitta Jónsdóttir, poet, editor and artist

The party had no leader, but rather was led collectively by three people each with a different responsibility. The party supported radical change at the government level in response to the recession.

On 14 August 2009, Þráinn Bertelsson left the party to sit as an independent. On 18 September 2009, the remaining three members left the party to create a new party, Hreyfingin (The Movement), and so the Citizens' Movement is no longer represented in the Althingi.

== Election results ==
Election	Votes	Vote %	Seats	Place
2009	13,519	7.2	4 / 63	5th
