= Margrét Tryggvadóttir =

Icelandic politician

Margrét Tryggvadóttir (born 20 May 1972 in Kópavogur) was a member of parliament of the Althing, the Icelandic parliament from 2009–2013 for The Movement and the Citizens' Movement. She was chair of the Movement in 2009–10.

She is also noted as a writer.

== Biography ==
Margrét was born to Tryggvi Páll Friðriksson (b. March 13, 1945), a manager and art dealer, and Elínbjört Jónsdóttir (b. January 3, 1947), a textiles teacher and art-dealer; her partner is Jóhann Ágúst Hansen (b. 10. April 1969), a scholar of business studies and also an art dealer (son of Hans Jakob Hansen and Elínbjörg Kristjánsdóttir). Her sons are Hans Alexander (b. 1993) and Elmar Tryggvi (b. 1997).

She graduated in 1992 from the Commercial College of Iceland and took a BA degree in General Literature at the University of Iceland in 1997.

Margrét worked in business and gallery management 1992–2008 and was a literary critic for the newspaper DV 1996–1999. She has been a freelance consultant on children's books and children's culture since 1997. She was a part-time lecturer at the Námsflokkar Reykjavíkur, the Iceland University of Education and elsewhere 1997–2000. She was editor of the journals Mál og menning then the press Edda útgáfa 2000–2003. She was a freelance photo editor, translator and copywriter 2003–2009 and a children's author.

Following the 2009 Icelandic financial crisis protests, Margrét became an Alþingismaður for the Suðurkjördæmi constituency 2009–2013 (Borgarahreyfingin, Hreyfingin).

She chaired The Movement 2009–2010 and chaired the parliamentary group of The Movement 2010–2011 and 2012–2013.

== Publications ==
In 2006, Margrét won the Icelandic Children's Book Prize for her Sagan af undurfögru prinsessunni og hugrakka prinsinum hennar (co-written with Halldór Baldurson). Her memoirs of her time in parliament were published in 2014 by Hansen og synir as Útistöður.

In 2021, she received the Guðrún Helgadóttir Children's Book Prize (Barnabókaverðlaun Guðrúnar Helgadóttur) for her book Sterk about a transgender girl investigating a missing person case.
