= The Movement (Iceland) =

The Movement Hreyfingin
- Chairperson: Birgitta Jónsdóttir
- Vice-chairperson: Þór Saari
- Founded: 18 September 2009
- Dissolved: 18 March 2012
- Split from: Citizens' Movement
- Succeeded by: Dawn
- Colours: Teal
- Seats in Parliament: 0 / 63

Website
- www.hreyfingin.is

The Movement (Icelandic: Hreyfingin) was a political movement in Iceland. It had three members of parliament in the Icelandic Parliament, the Althing. All of them were former Citizens' Movement (CM) MPs.

- Þór Saari, economist
- Margrét Tryggvadóttir, editor
- Birgitta Jónsdóttir, poet, editor and artist

The original Citizen's Movement had four members of parliament. However, since one MP, Þráinn Bertelsson, had already left the party in the summer of 2009, none remain. On March 18, 2012, it merged with Citizens' Movement and the Liberal Party to form a new political party called Dawn.
