= Left-Green Movement =

Left-Green Movement Vinstrihreyfingin – grænt framboð
- Abbreviation: VG
- Chairperson: Rósa Björk Brynjólfsdóttir
- Vice-chairperson: Bjarki Hjörleifsson
- General Secretary: Jana Salóme Ingibjargar-Jósepsdóttir
- Founded: 6 February 1999
- Split from: People's Alliance; Women's List
- Headquarters: Túngata 14 101, Reykjavík
- Youth wing: Young Left-Greens (Ungir vinstri grænir)
- Ideology: Eco-socialism; Democratic socialism; Feminism; Pacifism
- Political position: Centre-left to left-wing
- European affiliation: Unified European Left
- Nordic affiliation: Nordic Green Left Alliance
- Colours: Green Red
- Althing: 0 / 63

Election symbol
- V

Website
- vg.is

The Left-Green Movement (Icelandic: Vinstrihreyfingin – grænt framboð, lit. 'Left Movement – Green Candidature'), also known by its short-form name Vinstri græn (VG), is an eco-socialist political party in Iceland.

Since the 2024 Icelandic parliamentary election, the party has had no members in the Althing. The party chairperson is Rósa Björk Brynjólfsdóttir, the vice chair is Bjarki Hjörleifsson, and the general secretary is Jana Salóme Ingibjargar-Jósepsdóttir.

The Left-Green Movement is a member of the Nordic Green Left Alliance.

== History ==
The party was founded in 1999 by members of Althing who did not approve of the merger of left-wing political parties in Iceland which resulted in the formation of the Social Democratic Alliance.

In the 1999 Icelandic parliamentary election, the Left-Green Movement took 9.1% of the vote and six seats in the Althing. The party had five members in the 63-seat Icelandic parliament after the 2003 Icelandic parliamentary election, where it polled 8.8% of the vote. After the 2007 Icelandic parliamentary election, the party had nine seats in parliament, having received 14.3% of the vote.

After the 2009 Icelandic parliamentary election, the Left-Green Movement joined the first cabinet of Jóhanna Sigurðardóttir as the minor partner to the centre-left Social Democratic Alliance after the previous coalition government of the Alliance and the centre-right Independence Party collapsed. In the 2009 Icelandic parliamentary election, it rose from nine seats to 14. With this, it became Iceland's third-largest party (close behind the Independence Party) with 21.7% of the vote; this was the second largest outcome of a left-wing party in Iceland after the post-communist People's Alliance in 1978, when it got 22.9% of the vote. The party gained one seat in addition, when a non-party parliamentarian joined the party. Later, three members of the parliamentary group left the party. One joined the Nordic agrarian Progressive Party and two others became non-partisans.

After the 2013 Icelandic parliamentary election, the party was in the opposition and had seven seats in parliament. In the 2016 Icelandic parliamentary election, the party polled 15.9% of the vote and 10 seats in the Althing, becoming the second largest party, tied with the Pirates, after the Independence Party. However, after the collapse of the coalition government and snap parliamentary elections in 2017, the party increased its seats in parliament to 11 and became the second-largest party, forming a three-party coalition with the Independence Party and Progressive Party, and party chair Katrín Jakobsdóttir became the prime minister. The party lost three seats in the 2021 parliamentary elections, but stayed in government, with the tri-party coalition of the Independence Party, the Progressive Party and the Left-Green Movement, headed by Katrín forming another coalition.

Katrín stepped down as prime minister and party leader to run for President of Iceland in the 2024 election, which she lost, coming in second place after Halla Tómasdóttir. She was replaced as prime minister by the Independence Party's Bjarni Benediktsson. Guðmundur Ingi Guðbrandsson became the interim party leader after Katrín. He returned to his position as vice-chairperson when Svandís Svavarsdóttir was elected as the new party leader in October of 2024. On 13 October, Bjarni announced that the government had collapsed due to disputes over foreign policy, asylum seekers, and energy, prompting him to call for a parliamentary election in November. Four days after the announcement, the Left-Green Movement withdrew from the government.

In the subsequent election in 2024, the Left-Green Movement lost all their seats.

== Ideology ==
The Left-Green Movement focuses on democratic socialist values, feminism, and environmentalism, as well as increased democracy and direct involvement of the people in the administration of the country. The party opposes Iceland's involvement in NATO, and also the American invasion and occupation of Iraq and Afghanistan. The party rejects membership of the European Union, and supports the Palestinian cause in the Middle East. It considers the mutual adaptation and integration of immigrants into Icelandic society as necessary.

== Election results ==
| Election | Leader | Votes | % | Seats | +/– | Position | Government |
|---|---|---|---|---|---|---|---|
| 1999 | Steingrímur J. Sigfússon | 15,115 | 9.12 | 6 / 63 | New | 4th | Opposition |
| 2003 | Steingrímur J. Sigfússon | 16,129 | 8.80 | 5 / 63 | ▼1 | 4th | Opposition |
| 2007 | Steingrímur J. Sigfússon | 26,136 | 14.35 | 9 / 63 | ▲4 | ▲3rd | Opposition |
| 2009 | Steingrímur J. Sigfússon | 40,581 | 21.68 | 14 / 63 | ▲5 | 3rd | Coalition |
| 2013 | Katrín Jakobsdóttir | 20,546 | 10.87 | 7 / 63 | ▼7 | ▼4th | Opposition |
| 2016 | Katrín Jakobsdóttir | 30,166 | 15.91 | 10 / 63 | ▲3 | ▲2nd | Opposition |
| 2017 | Katrín Jakobsdóttir | 33,155 | 16.89 | 11 / 63 | ▲1 | 2nd | Coalition |
| 2021 | Katrín Jakobsdóttir | 25,114 | 12.57 | 8 / 63 | ▼3 | ▼3rd | Coalition |
| 2024 | Svandís Svavarsdóttir | 4,973 | 2.34 | 0 / 63 | ▼8 | ▼9th | Extra-parliamentary |

== Leadership ==
| Nº | Chairman | Took office | Left office |
|---|---|---|---|
| 1 | Steingrímur J. Sigfússon (born 1955) | 1999 | 2013 |
| 2 | Katrín Jakobsdóttir (born 1976) | 2013 | 2024 |
| 3 | Guðmundur Ingi Guðbrandsson (born 1977) | April 2024 (as acting chairperson) | October 2024 |
| 3 | Svandís Svavarsdóttir (born 1964) | October 2024 | present |
