= Magnús Árni Magnússon =

Icelandic politician (born 1968)

Magnús Árni Magnússon (MagnM)
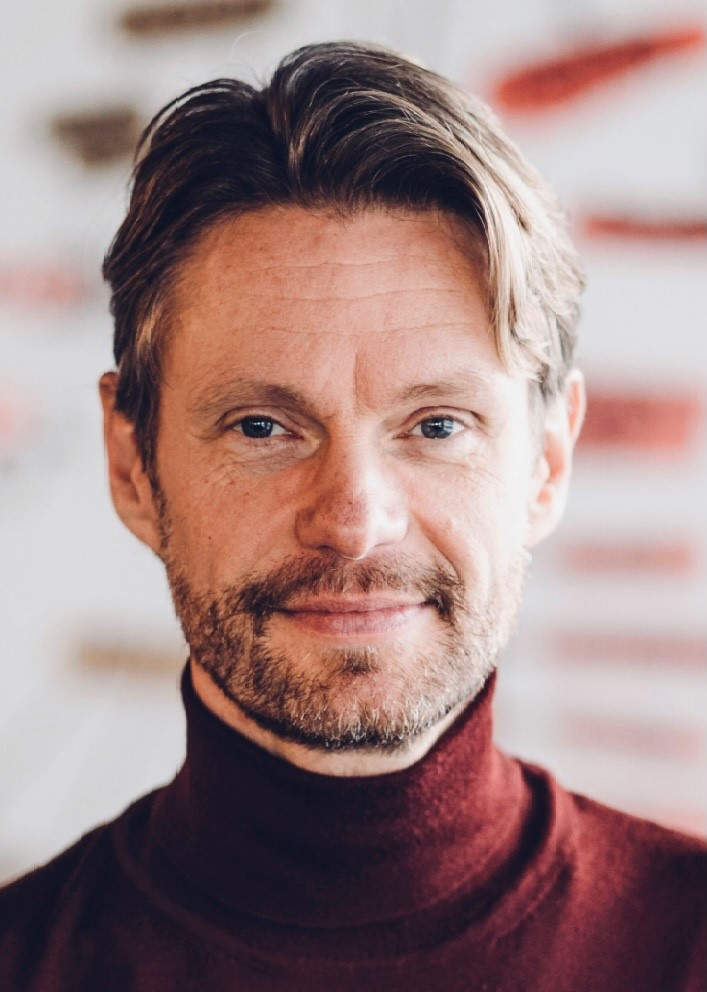

Member of the Althing
- In office 14 October 1998 – 8 May 1999
- Preceded by: Ásta B. Þorsteinsdóttir
- Constituency: Reykjavík

Personal details
- Born: 14 March 1968 (age 58) Reykjavík, Iceland
- Party: Social Democratic Alliance
- Education: University of Iceland; University of San Francisco; Trinity Hall, Cambridge; Iceland University of the Arts

Magnús Árni Skjöld Magnússon (born 14 March 1968) is an Icelandic academic, politician and former member of the Althing. A member of the Social Democratic Alliance, he represented the Reykjavík constituency from October 1998 to May 1999.

== Early life ==
Magnús was born on 14 March 1968 in Reykjavík. He is the son of school principal Magnús Bæringur Kristinsson and teacher Guðrún Sveinsdóttir. He graduated from Breiðholt Polytechnic School (FB) in 1989. He has a Bachelor of Arts degree in philosophy from the University of Iceland (HÍ) (1997); a Master of Arts degree in economics from the University of San Francisco (1998); a Master of Philosophy degree in European studies from Trinity Hall, Cambridge (2001); a Doctor of Philosophy degree in political science from HÍ (2011); and a Master of Music degree from the Iceland University of the Arts (LHÍ) (2022).

== Career ==
Magnús had summer jobs whilst studying, in Icelandair's ticketing department (1985–1988) and as a journalist at the Alþýðublaðið (1989–1990). He was a class leader (1991 and 1993–1996) and a senior class leader (1997–1998) at the Work School in Kópavogur. He was a representative for Nordjobb (1992) and an executive director of the Association of Young Social Democrats (SUJ) (1993–1994). He was a journalist at Alþýðublaðið (1994–1995) and PC World Ísland (1996–1998), and news editor at Netheimur (1998).

Magnús has held several positions at Bifröst University: lecturer and later associate professor (2000–2006), assistant rector (2001–2006), rector (2010–2011) and associate professor (since 2011). He was a partner at Capacent (2006–2008), director of the Creative Arts School at Keilir (2008–2009) and director of the Institute of Social Sciences at HÍ (2009–2010). He later worked at the Department of European Studies at The Hague University of Applied Sciences and as a civilian representative in Kabul for the NATO invasion and occupation of Afghanistan (2018).

Magnús was on the executive board of the Association Nordic Social Democratic Youth from 1988 to 1990 and was chairman of SUJ in 1994. He was on the executive board of the Social Democratic Party from 1994 to 1996 and was chairman of the party's Kópavogur branch from 1996 to 1998. He was appointed to the Althing in October 1998 following the death of Ásta B. Þorsteinsdóttir. He was substitute member of the Althing for Helga Vala Helgadóttir in February 2023, for Jóhann Páll Jóhannsson in November 2023 and from January 2024 to February 2024, and for Dagbjört Hákonardóttir in February 2024.

== Personal life ==
Magnús married historian Sigríður Björk Jónsdóttir but the marriage ended in divorce. They have three sons and a daughter.

== Electoral history ==
Electoral history of Magnús Árni Magnússon
Election	Constituency	Party	Votes	Result
1995 parliamentary	Reykjavík	Social Democratic Party	7,468	Not elected
2021 parliamentary	Reykjavík North	Social Democratic Alliance	1,121	Not elected

== Works ==
Magnus has authored several books and papers including:

- Borgríkið – Reykjavík sem framtíð þjóðar [The city-state – Reykjavík as the future of a nation] (in Icelandic). Reykjavík, Iceland: Bifröst University. 2020. ISBN 9789935517227.
- How I Became the Yoga Teacher in Kabul. Mjaldur Publishing. 2023. ISBN 9798396321595.
- —— & Joy, Casey (2023). Climate-Ready: A Practical Guide to Prepping in the Era of Global Boiling. Mjaldur Publishing. ISBN 9798866161614.
- City State: Reykjavík in Context. Mjaldur Publishing. 2024. ISBN 9798872216261.
- Svo langt frá heimsins vígaslóð: Lýðveldið Ísland í samhengi [So far from the world's battlefield: The Republic of Iceland in context] (in Icelandic). Reykjavík, Iceland: Bifröst University. 2024. ISBN 9798321887424.
