= Þórður Snær Júlíusson =

Icelandic journalist (born 1980)

Member of the Althing
- Incumbent
- Assumed office 2024
- Constituency: Reykjavík North

Personal details
- Born: 1 December 1980 (age 45)
- Party: Social Democratic Alliance

Þórður Snær Skagfjörð Júlíusson (born 1 December 1980) is an Icelandic journalist.

== Biography ==
Þórður was the co-founder and editor-in-chief of news outlet Kjarninn until it merged with Stundin in 2023 to form Heimildin. Þórður was co-editor of Heimildin until his exit in late July 2024. In the 2024 Icelandic parliamentary election, he was elected to the Parliament of Iceland for the Social Democratic Alliance. However, prior to polling day Þórður had declared that even if elected he would not take up his seat as MP after some misogynist online texts by him emerged. His resignation as MP was confirmed on the day that the newly elected parliament summoned for the first time.
