= Guðrún Ögmundsdóttir =

Icelandic politician (1950–2019)

Member of the Althing
- In office 8 May 1999 – 12 May 2007
- Constituency: Reykjavík North

Personal details
- Born: 19 October 1950 Reykjavík, Iceland
- Died: 31 December 2019 (aged 69) Kópavogur, Iceland
- Political party: Social Democratic Party; Social Democratic Alliance
- Spouse: Gísli Arnór Víkingsson
- Children: 2

Guðrún Ögmundsdóttir (19 October 1950 – 31 December 2019) was an Icelandic politician for the Social Democratic Party and then the Social Democratic Alliance who was an elected member of the Althing representing the Reykjavík North constituency from 1999 to 2007. She also twice served on Reykjavík City Council and was a board member and later chair of UNICEF Iceland between 2016 and 2018. Guðrún had a biography on her written by Halla Gunnarsdóttir that was published in 2010 and she received the Knight's Cross of the Order of the Falcon nine years later.

== Biography ==
On 19 October 1950, Guðrún was born in Reykjavík. She was adopted at birth by the Chief Foreman of the Lighthouse and Harbor Authority Ögmundur Jónsson and the housewife Jóhanna J. Guðjónsdóttir from her birth mother Hulda Valdimarsdóttir. Guðrún worked as a supervisor for Þjóðviljan's equality page from 1978 to 1979 and as a reporter at the Royal Danish Theatre in 1982. She graduated from Roskilde University in 1983 with a Bachelor of Arts degree in sociology and social work. She would later complete her postgraduate studies at the same institution and earn a master's degree (Cand.comm.) in media studies in 1985. While studying in Denmark, Guðrún became involved in social work in Iceland and served on the board of the Student Association in Copenhagen and later on the board of the Icelandic Association for overseas students from 1985 to 1988. She was editor of Icelandic Students' Magazine Abroad between 1985 and 1987 and was on the editorial board of Veru in 1986. She was a senior social worker in the gynaecology ward of the Department of Obstetrics and Gynaecology at Landspítali between 1988 and 1994 and briefly worked at the Faculty of Medicine as well as the Faculty of Social Sciences at the University of Iceland as a part-time lecturer.

Guðrún was long involved in politics and was elected Deputy Mayor of Reykjavík City Council in 1990 and served in the position until 1992. During the same time period, she was on the Social Affairs Council as an alternate member and was on the board of the Borgarspítalinn. Guðrún was a primary representative of Reykjavík City Council from 1992 to 1998 and was a member of the Reykjavík City Council as the Reykjavík List's City Representative and Vice President and Chairman of the Social Affairs Council between 1994 and early 1998. She also held a multitude of confidential positions on behalf of Reykjavík City Council. From 1998 to 1999, Guðrún was head of department at the Ministry of Social Affairs.

At the 1999 Icelandic parliamentary election, she was elected to serve in the Althing as a member of the Social Democratic Party (later the Social Democratic Alliance) in the Reykjavík North constituency. While serving in the Althing, Guðrún was a member of the Social Affairs Committee, the Althing General Committee and the Health and Social Security Committee. She sat in ten legislatures and conducted work in the Nordic for Parliament. In 2003, Guðrún asked for a report on people cohabiting and it found same-sex couples did not have the same rights as heterosexual couples. She helped to come up with legislation that gave same-sex couples the same rights as heterosexual people to adopt and to receive assisted insemination treatment from 27 June 2006. Guðrún also lobbied for women's freedom, women's rights and the rights of minorities. From 2003 to 2007, she represented the Iceland Division of the West Nordic Council.

Guðrún was employed by the Ministry of Justice from 20 September 2010 to work as a liaison between the state and those who were put into public housing when they were children and adolescents and subjected to harsh treatment. From 2011 to 2018, she was a board member and later between 2016 and 2018 chair of UNICEF Iceland. Guðrún gained re-election to Reykjavík City Council in 2017. A biography of Guðrún, Hjartað ræður för, was authored by Halla Gunnarsdóttir and published in 2010.

== Personal life ==
Guðrún was married to the Marine Research Institute specialist Gísli Arnór Víkingsson. The couple were the parents of two children. She was appointed Knight's Cross of the Order of the Falcon in June 2019 for her "contribution to humanity and the struggle for equality of gay people". On the morning of 31 December 2019, Guðrún died of cancer in the palliative department of the Landspítali in Kópavogur.

== Legacy ==
In September 2019, she was honoured by the NGO Samtökin '78 with its badge of honour "for her fight for the increased rights of gay people." A total of 11,430 signatures supporting a child violence prevention campaign were received by the Minister of Social Affairs and Children Ásmundur Einar Daðason on behalf of Guðrún's legacy.
