= Diljá (name) =

- Gender: Female

Origin
- Origin: Iceland

Diljá is an Icelandic female given name. It is Icelandic form of Delia. Notable people with the name include:

- Diljá (born 2002), Icelandic singer
- Diljá Mist Einarsdóttir (born 1987), Icelandic politician and lawyer
- Diljá Ögn Lárusdóttir (born 2003), Icelandic basketball player
- Diljá Ýr Zomers (born 2001), Icelandic footballer
