= List of accidents and incidents involving military aircraft (1975–1979) =

This is a list of accidents and incidents involving military aircraft grouped by the year in which the accident or incident occurred. Not all of the aircraft were in operation at the time. Combat losses are not included except for a very few cases denoted by singular circumstances.

== Aircraft terminology ==
Information on aircraft gives the type, and if available, the serial number of the operator in italics, the constructors number, also known as the manufacturer's serial number (c/n), exterior codes in apostrophes, nicknames (if any) in quotation marks, flight callsign in italics, and operating units.

== 1975 ==
2 January
U.S. Navy Grumman F-14A-70-GR Tomcat, BuNo 158982, 'NK107', of VF-1, the first of the Pacific Fleet F-14 squadrons to form, deployed aboard USS Enterprise, crashes into the sea off Cubi Point after an inflight engine explosion. Both crew successfully eject. This is one of two squadron losses during the 1974–75 deployment that signalled the fan-blade containment problems which plagued early versions of the TF30 turbofan.

9 January
A USAF Convair T-29D-CO, 52-5826, c/n 52–25, returning to Langley AFB, Virginia, from Key Field, Meridian, Mississippi, with seven Air Force personnel on board, suffers mid-air collision at 1836 hrs. with a Cessna 150H, N50430, of Cavalier Flyers, with two U.S. Navy personnel on board, 4.1 miles (6.5 km) W of Newport News, Virginia, the wreckage of both aircraft coming down in the James River. A Langley AFB spokesman said that Army salvage workers, aided by local authorities, recovered wreckage and bodies from the river throughout the following weekend. Capt. Gail Anderson of Langley AFB stated that divers had recovered one of the two engines of the T-29 as well as other "significant" parts which were placed on a barge and returned to Langley by Sunday 12 January. Seven of the nine victims' bodies had also been recovered but Maj. Loving stated that the identities of the victims would not be released until all bodies had been identified. The wreckage of the two aircraft were located in the river ~300 yards apart. The probable cause was given as "The human limitation inherent in the see-and-avoid concept, which can be critical in a terminal area with a combination of controlled and uncontrolled traffic. A possible contributing factor was the reduced nighttime conspicuity of the Cessna against a background of city lights." "Following the collision, Billy E. Commander, chief of the Norfolk air traffic control tower, said a new Stage III radar service designed to reduce the potential for mid-air collisions will be available in February to aircraft served by Norfolk Regional Airport and should assure that planes have at least 500 feet of vertical separation from each other."

14 January
VF-1, the first of the Pacific Fleet F-14 Tomcat squadrons to form, deployed aboard USS Enterprise, loses second of two aircraft during the 1974–75 deployment, signalling fan-blade containment problems with early TF30 turbofans, when F-14A-70-GR, BuNo 159001, 'NK112', crashes into the sea near Cubi Point after engine failure. Both crew successfully eject.

9 February
A Luftwaffe Transall C-160D, 50+63, c/n D-85, one of three en route from Hohn Air Base, West Germany, to Chania-Souda Airport, Crete, Greece, strikes 5,000-foot Mount Koukoules in a snow storm, killing all 42 on board.

10 February
The Royal Australian Navy suffers its only operational Grumman S-2E Tracker loss during approximately 17 years of operation of the type when N12-153608 is lost at sea with two fatalities.

21 March
Due to an error by an air traffic controller, the wrong landing instructions are conveyed to Lockheed C-141A Starlifter, 64-0641, of the 62d Military Airlift Wing on approach to McChord AFB, Washington, from Japan, to descend below safe minimums and it impacts on the 5,900-foot level of Warrior Peak in the Mount Constance range in the Olympic National Forest, Washington, killing 16 passengers and crew. A controller gave descent instructions intended for a U.S. Navy Grumman A-6 Intruder en route from Pendleton, Oregon, to NAS Whidbey Island, Washington, to the Military Airlift Command C-141. The two aircraft were both at 10,000 feet, about 60 miles apart.

22 March
Hellenic Air Force LTV A-7H Corsair II, BuNo 159676, crashes near Souda, Greece, the first reported A-7H crash.

24 March
A Royal Air Force Handley Page Victor K.1A, XH618, of 57 Squadron collided with a RAF Hawker Siddeley Buccaneer XV156 during a simulated refuelling. Buccaneer hit the Victor's tailplane causing the aircraft to crash into the sea 95 miles E of Sunderland, County Durham.

4 April

A USAF Lockheed C-5A Galaxy, 68-0218, c/n 500-0021, taking part in Operation Babylift, a mass evacuation of children from South Vietnam during the Fall of Saigon, experiences an explosive decompression about 40 mi (64 km) outside Saigon when the rear ramp and pressure door blow out, damaging the plane's flight controls. The plane, carrying 328 crew, troops, children, and adult escorts, crashes into a rice paddy after the pilot loses control while trying to return to Tan Son Nhut Air Base; 155 die, including 76 orphans.

May
Two Không quân Nhân dân Việt Nam (Vietnam People's Air Force) Mikoyan-Gurevich MiG-19s collide in mid-air over Nội Bài airfield, North Vietnam, during practice for air display to celebrate the North Vietnamese victory in the Vietnam War. Both pilots killed.

8 May
Second prototype General Dynamics YF-16A Fighting Falcon, 72-01568, on practice flight prior to deployment for the Paris Air Show, suffers failure of main undercarriage leg to extend. General Dynamics test pilot Neil Anderson flies aircraft until fuel is nearly exhausted then makes expert grass belly-landing at Carswell Air Force Base, Texas. Aircraft is not heavily damaged and pilot is uninjured. Airframe is then sent to Rome Air Development Center Newport Site for use in radar tests. This was the first F-16 mishap.

13 May
Sikorsky CH-53C, 68-10933, c/n 65–231, Knife 13, of the 21st Special Operations Squadron, departs from Nakhon Phanom Royal Thai Air Force Base with a crew of five and 18 USAF Security Police on board to assist in the recovery operation of the SS Mayaguez. The helicopter disappears from the airfield's departure radar 40 miles W of the airfield. All on board are killed. The Air Force issues a "temporary flight restriction" order, a grounding order, on 22 May 1975, for 40 HH-53 and 12 CH-53, following an inspection crew reaching the jungle crash site. A main rotor blade separated from the head in flight.

29 May
Lockheed U-2A, 56-6700, Article 367, seventh airframe of first USAF contract, delivered to USAF at Groom Lake in February 1957, but apparently transferred to the Central Intelligence Agency by June 1957, then to Strategic Air Command in fall 1960, converted to U-2C by October 1966. Converted for Advanced Location and Strike System (ALSS) project, 1972. Crashed in a heavily wooded area of West Germany ~100 miles NE of Bonne, Capt. Robert "Terry" Rendleman, 30, of Tucson, Arizona, escaping unhurt after experiencing flight control problems, aircraft entering Mach tuck at high altitude, forcing pilot to eject. He was taken to hospital in Wiesbaden in good condition, an Air Force spokesman said. Aircraft was on Constant Treat deployment of the ALSS system.

30 May
A USAF Lockheed T-33 Shooting Star crashes at Tyndall AFB, Florida, killing two pilots, one of whom had who had graduated from pilot training at the base on Thursday 29 May. "Witnesses said the plane dipped into some trees short of the runway and apparently burst into flames. Wreckage was scattered throughout a wooded area adjacent to the base." This is the first fatal crash at Tyndall since 19 October 1972 downing of a Convair F-106 Delta Dart which killed its pilot.

1 June
A Kenyan Air Force Hawker Hunter crashes at Nairobi, Kenya, during celebrations marking the anniversary of self-rule in the former British colony, the airframe impacting only a few hundred yards from where President Jomo Kenyatta is addressing a public rally. The two crew of the fighter are killed instantly, with the jet narrowly missing a crowded bus as it skids across a four-lane highway. The bus brakes to a halt and fills with smoke from the burning wreckage. A second Hunter jet makes an emergency landing at Nairobi International Airport, where, according to one witness, it narrowly misses a loaded Pan American jet "by a matter of feet." The airport closes briefly after the incident.

4 June
Sikorsky SH-3D Sea King, BuNo 152711, of HS-4, departs Naval Auxiliary Air Field Imperial Beach, California, at 1900 hours, en route to the Helicopter Offshore Training Area to conduct a scheduled night anti-submarine sonar training flight. The crew commences operations with four approaches to sonar hover and four night/low visibility and wind-line rescue patterns with hover trim practice until dusk. After sunset (1953 hours), the crew conducts four more approaches to sonar hovers while practising dip-to-dip navigation with the pilots alternating approaches until 2133. With the sonar dome lowered down to 100 feet below the water's surface, the hover of the helicopter becomes unstable. The two sonar operators, sink the sonar dome deeper in the ocean, hoping the stability will improve and, for a brief moment, it works. But, then the sonar dome begins to pull Helo '740' downward to 30 feet above the waterline. The helicopter, pulled backwards, impacts the water, sinks quickly. The four crewmen were picked up by a Coast Guard Sikorsky HH-3F Pelican shortly before midnight and transported to the Naval Hospital at San Diego. Three crewmen are released from the hospital in the days that follow, but the pilot, who suffered a ruptured spleen, dies in hospital over three weeks later. This aircraft was 'Helo 66' that had retrieved the Apollo 13 crew from the Pacific on 17 April 1970.

15 August
Lockheed U-2R, 68-10334, Article 056, sixth airframe of the first R-model order, first flown 18 May 1968, N814X allocated, delivered to 100th SRW, 10 June 1968. Crashes into the Gulf of Thailand ~50 miles S of U-Tapao on ferry flight back to the U.S. from U-Tapao. Shortly after departing the Thai base (in the company of another U-2R and a KC-135 tanker) on a very dark night, the autopilot develops problems and Capt Little loses control as it overspeeds. The tail separates and the pilot ejects, being rescued by a fishing boat in the Gulf of Thailand the next morning. Although Little survives, he never flies a U-2 again, SAC tradition at the time. This is the second U-2R loss.

23 August
A Grumman A-6E Intruder, BuNo 149948, 'AJ-500', of VA-35, and a McDonnell Douglas F-4J Phantom II from USS Nimitz collide in midair over the Atlantic Ocean during a refueling maneuver ~600 miles SSW of Scotland. The two crew of the A-6 were missing and presumed dead while the two of the F-4J were recovered.

26 August
LTV A-7D-12-CV Corsair II, 72-0172, of the 76th Tactical Fighter Squadron, 23rd Tactical Fighter Wing, England AFB, Louisiana, crashes on a test range on the eastern area of the Eglin AFB, Florida, reservation at ~2240 hrs. during a night training mission. The aircraft, part of a three-ship flight, had departed England AFB at ~2015 hrs. for a ground attack simulation at Eglin. The A-7D went down while orbiting the range with the other two aircraft of the flight. Pilot Capt. William N. Clark, 33, of Little Rock, Arkansas, is KWF. "The cause of the crash is unknown at this time but is being investigated by a board of qualified officers," The three jets were slated to return to England AFB directly after completing the mission, Smith said. Capt. Clark is survived by his wife and three children who reside at England AFB.

1 September
Egyptian Air Force Tupolev Tu-16K11-16, 4403, crashed over the Menya area of Egypt. It had a left engine fire and the bullets of the second navigator's gun were exploding. Pilot Wing Commander Mohamed Keraidy refused to bail out as he tried to rescue his crew. The intercom was disabled due to the fire. Co-pilot Fl. Lt. Adel El Fiky bailed out safely. Major Samir Abdel Fattah, 1st Navigator, died while trying to eject. Captain Salah El Menshawy, 2nd Navigator, died instantly from the explosion of the oxygen thermos behind him in the bomber. Keraidy finally bailed out several minutes after putting the bomber in a dive position into the river Nile in order to reduce the explosion. Gunner and radioman did not escape the aircraft and were killed. The pilot was taken by a helicopter to the Maadi military hospital in Cairo and died in the ICU several hours later. This crash was the longest emergency case in the Egyptian Air Force. Wing Commander Keraidy was the first Egyptian officer to be given the Golden Military Bravery Medal, first Category, without dying in a battle.

3 September
A USAF Boeing B-52G Stratofortress, 57-6493, of the 68th Bomb Wing, Seymour Johnson AFB, North Carolina, crashed near Aiken, South Carolina, when the aircraft suffered major structural failure due to a major fuel leak with the right wing separating between the third and fourth engine nacelles, the wing then shearing off the horizontal stabilizer. The bomber rolled inverted and broke apart. Witnesses described it as a "ball of fire" which then plunged into a wooded area. Wreckage was spread over a 10-mile area. Four crewmembers successfully ejected, three killed. The aircraft was on a routine training mission and was carrying no weapons, last reported flying at an altitude of 28,000 feet. The Department of Defense said that 67 B-52s have crashed, including 17 in the Vietnam War.

10 September
A U.S. Army Bell UH-1H Iroquois from Fort Rucker Army Base, Alabama, on a routine training flight crashes and burns three miles SE of Marianna Municipal Airport, Marianna, Florida, killing all three crew, an instructor pilot and two students, military officials said. The identities of the victims was being withheld pending notification of next of kin. Army officials were investigating the cause of the crash.

25 September
A flight of four Lockheed F-104G Starfighters of the Aeronautica Militare Italiana (Italian Air Force) crash in formation into a field near the village of Ralingen near the border with Luxembourg, ~12 miles S of Bitburg, West Germany, shortly after take-off from Bitburg Air Base, killing all four pilots. The four jets flown by an Italian Air Force lieutenant colonel and three captains came down just five minutes after departing. The Bitburg control tower operated by the United States Air Force in Europe said that radio contact with the flight was lost almost immediately after they took off into overcast skies. "They crashed in line, the four craters being within an area of one square kilometer (about four-tenths of a square mile)," a German defense ministry spokesman said. The last crash of a formation of Starfighters occurred in West Germany in 1962 when an American pilot teaching stunt flying to three Germans led his formation in a dive into an abandoned strip mine near Cologne.

26 September
A USAF CH-53C Super Jolly Green Giant of the 601st Tactical Air Support Squadron carrying 16 U. S. Air Force personnel crashed into a farm near Delbrück, Germany while on a mission to survey a site for a radar installation in central Germany. All aboard were killed.

14 October
An RAF Avro Vulcan B.2, XM645, of 9 Sqn RAF Waddington breaks up over Żabbar, Malta, after a hard landing shears off the port-side undercarriage, piercing a wing fuel tank and starting a fire. The pilot and co-pilot initiate a second landing attempt but eject when they realize that the plane cannot make it back to the runway. The subsequent explosion kills 5 crew members who remained aboard, and an electrical cable severed by falling debris kills a bystander on the ground.

14 October
A USAF McDonnell Douglas F-15A Eagle, 73-0088, of the 555th TFTS, 58th TFTW, crashes W of Minersville, Utah, due to electrical smoke/fire from generator failure; pilot ejects safely. This was the first F-15 crash.

31 October
Final Hawker-Siddeley P.1127 prototype (of six), XP984, first with new swept wing with leading edge extensions and steel cold nozzles, first flown in October 1963, is destroyed in landing accident at RAE Bedford.

19 November
First of three Boeing-Vertol YUH-61 helicopters completed, 73-21656, crashes and is moderately damaged during testing, but two company pilots escape injury. Cause is found to be failure of tail rotor drive shaft after the main rotor oversped during an auto-rotational recovery. Airframe is repaired. Now preserved at the Army Aviation Museum, Fort Rucker, Alabama. Type loses competition to Sikorsky UH-60 and airframes four and five are not completed.

25 November
Israeli Air Force Lockheed C-130H Hercules 203/4X-FBO, on a training flight over the northern Sinai crashed into cloud-covered Mount Jebel Halal, 55 kilometers south-southeast of El Arish, Sinai Peninsula, killing all 20 on board. Eleven of the dead were infantrymen, mostly sergeants, and none of higher rank. The other nine were air force crewmen, a military spokesman said. Military censors held up news of the crash for 27 hours. Pilots were Shaul Bustan and Uri Manor.

23 December
LTV A-7D Corsair II, 67-14586, while assigned to Eglin AFB, Florida's 3246th Test Wing, Air Development & Test Center for mission support, suffers engine failure on take-off from Tallahassee Municipal Airport, Florida and makes forced landing, coming down largely intact. Airframe is hauled back to Eglin AFB on a truck, where it is either scrapped or becomes a target hulk.

23 December
General Dynamics FB-111A, 68–290, crashes in the area of the Ashland forest in Maine, ~45 minutes after take-off from Loring AFB, Maine.

== 1976 ==
2 January
USMC McDonnell-Douglas F-4J Phantom II, BuNo 155506, of VMFA-333, crashes on approach to NAS Oceana, Virginia. Both crew eject safely.

30 January
A Convair PQM-102A Delta Dagger, '627', converted from F-102A, 56-1434, belonging to the Fairchild Corporation according to a press report, crashed on landing at Bob Sikes Airport, Crestview, Florida when the landing gear collapsed. Airframe destroyed by fire. Sperry Flight Systems pilot, Earl C. Pearce, was unhurt.
Two USAF McDonnell F-4D Phantom II 's, assigned to the 8th TFW at Kunsan AFB, Korea, were lost in a midair collision. Both aircraft crashed approximately 15 miles south of Taejon / 75 miles south of Seoul.. All four crew died.

1 March
Lt. Col. Michael V. Love, 37, chief USAF test pilot on the Martin-Marietta X-24B program, is killed in the crash of a McDonnell RF-4C Phantom II, 64-1002, the sixth RF-4C, of the Air Force Flight Test Center, on a dry lakebed at Edwards AFB, California, after take-off on a proficiency flight when his ejection seat malfunctions. Navigator Maj. E. B. Underwood Jr. ejects before the crash. After serving in the lifting body program as chase pilot on various Northrop M2 and X-24A flights, Love made his first X-24B flight on 4 October 1973, and piloted the plane to its fastest speed—better than 1,860 km/h—before terminating the program with a hard-surface runway landing at Edwards on 20 August 1975.

5 March
F-14a bureau number 159826 crashed at NAS Patuxent River after entering the first F-14 flat spin while conducting aileron/rudder interconnect tests. Strike Aircraft Directorate Chief Test Pilot CDR D.D. Smith and RIO LCDR Pete Angelina ejected successfully.

9 May
Imperial Iranian Air Force, flight ULF48, a 747 freighter crashed near Madrid, due to the structural failure of its left wing in flight, killing the 17 people on board. The accident investigation determined that a lightning strike caused an explosion in a fuel tank in the wing, leading to flutter and the separation of the wing.

June
The first prototype of the Bell YAH-63, 73-22246, first flown on 1 October 1975, crashed in 1976, but a static test prototype was brought up to flight standard and, along with the second prototype, 73-22247, entered the flyoff against the Hughes entry, the Model 77, YAH-64. The U.S. Army ultimately selected the AH-64 over the Bell entry, naming it the Apache.

9 August
Sikorsky YUH-60A UTTAS, 73-21650, first prototype to fly, fully loaded with 14 Army personnel during testing, makes emergency landing at 2315 hrs. in a wooded area of Fort Campbell, Kentucky, due to vibration caused by outer skin of a main rotor blade coming loose. Due to heavy mist, pilot CW2 Charlie Lovell believes he is landing in a cornfield but instead comes down in a pine forest. Main rotor scythes down 40 pines, some as large as five inches in diameter, as it lands, but main rotor blades do not shatter. Only injury is to a soldier who bumps his head against a truncated pine as he egresses the helicopter. After cutting down stumps around the aircraft, and replacing the main and tail rotors, the now-nicknamed "Phoenix" is flown out of the site three days later. US Army, duly impressed by the crash survivability shown, will award the UTTAS contract to Sikorsky and the design will be named the Blackhawk. This airframe will be destroyed in a crash on 19 May 1978.

28 August
C-141A 67-0008 stalled and crashed after an aborted landing at Sondestrom AB, Greenland killing 23 of the 27 crew and passengers.

28 August
C-141A 67-0006 broke up in a severe thunderstorm while on descent into RAF Mildenhall, UK, killing 18 passengers and crew. The crash site was close to the village of Thorney.

3 September
A Lockheed C-130H Hercules, 7772, "24 de Julio", belonging to the Venezuelan Air Force crashed in the Azores Islands, near the Lajes Field at ~2145 hrs., while attempting an approach in a storm (Hurricane Emmy). 64 passengers, including most of the University Choir of the Venezuelan Central University (Universidad Central de Venezuela) and its Director Mr. Vinicio Adames, together with 4 crewmembers died in the accident.

6 September
Lt. Viktor Ivanovich Belenko, of the 513th Fighter Regiment, 11th Air Army, based at Chuguyevka, Primorsky Krai, Soviet Union, defects to Japan in a nearly new MiG-25P Foxbat, USSR Product #84, Bort 'Red 31', landing at Hakodate Airport. Despite deploying two drag chutes, the heavy interceptor overruns the mile-long runway, knocks over two small antennae, and damages the nose landing gear. The pilot is granted asylum by the United States and the aircraft is eventually returned to the Soviet Union – after it has been dismantled and examined by Western experts, an intelligence windfall of the highest order.

14 September
While the USS John F. Kennedy is operating ~100 miles NW of Scapa Flow, Scotland, as part of a 100 ship NATO naval exercise, Teamwork 76, a Grumman F-14A Tomcat, BuNo 159588, 'AB 221', of VF-32, over the side into the North Sea when its engines go inexplicably to full power while the fighter is being prepped for catapult 3. Steered to port away from other aircraft by the pilot as the locked brakes fail to keep the jet in place, the Tomcat's starboard wing strikes two other aircraft and as it tips off of the flight deck, pilot and his radar intercept officer, eject. A Soviet cruiser shadowing the manoeuvers notes the loss of the Tomcat and its state-of-the-art Phoenix missile and AN/AWG-9 fire control radar, so the U.S. Navy is forced into an immediate recovery effort that takes eight weeks. The nuclear research submarine NR-1 eventually retrieves the missile from a depth of 1,650 feet, and two leased heavy trawlers snag and drag the Tomcat to shallower water where the heavily damaged airframe is salvaged and found to have all its sub-systems intact.

26 September
A USAF Boeing KC-135A Stratotanker, 61-0296, c/n 18203, of the 46th Air Refueling Squadron, Strategic Air Command, on a routine tanker training mission en route from K.I. Sawyer AFB, Michigan, to Offutt AFB, Nebraska (two sources list Wurtsmith AFB, Michigan as its destination), crashes at 0830 hrs. EDT in a densely wooded swampy area near Alpena, Michigan, killing 15 of the 20 on board. Sole witness to the accident, Hubbard Lake farmer Elmer Liske, 48, saw the aircraft flying low over the treetops. "It suddenly started to go down", Liske said. "It blew up, and I saw a big ball of fire, and then it exploded several more times." Possible cabin pressurization problem may have led to the accident.

25 October
Lockheed SR-71A, 61-7965, Article 2016, lost near Lovelock, Nevada during night training sortie following INS platform failure. Pilot St. Martin and RSO Carnochan eject safely.

27 October
General Dynamics F-111E, 67-0116, c/n A1-161 / E-2, of the 3246th Test Wing, Armament Development and Test Center, one of two assigned to the base, crashed at Eglin AFB, Florida, upon return from a test mission. Crew, pilot Capt. Douglas A. Joyce, and Capt. Richard Mullane, deployed crew escape module safely and were uninjured.

4 December
A fire in a hangar at HMAS Albatross (NAS Nowra), Australia, damaged or destroyed 12 of 13 Grumman S-2E Trackers of the Royal Australian Navy, assigned to squadrons VC851 and VS816. A 19-year-old junior member of the Fleet Air Arm of the Royal Australian Navy later admitted to arson, but was found mentally unstable at his court martial.

17 December
A Boeing Vertol CH-46D Seaknight helicopter BUNO 153337 from a detachment of Helicopter Combat Support Squadron Six (HC-6) embarked with USS San Diego flying a night vertical replenishment (VERTREP) mission lost an engine on takeoff from USS Milwaukee and landed in the Mediterranean Sea. While the crew was attempting to restart the engine, the aircraft rolled inverted and sank 125 km E of Cagliari, Sardinia. Two pilots and one aircrewman were rescued. A second aircrewman was lost with the aircraft.

21 December
Imperial Iranian Air Force Lockheed C-130H Hercules 5-8536 crashed during approach in bad weather to Shiraz, Iran.

== 1977 ==
17 January
Avro Vulcan B.2, XM600, of 101 Squadron, crashes at Spilsby, Lincs. after the five crew abandon the aircraft due to a fire which started in the port wing during a RAT (Ram Air Turbine) deployment from high altitude. The RAT overvaulted and its power arced to a high pressure fuel line to the #1 engine. The fuel line ruptured between the pressure sensor for the engine and the high-pressure fuel pump causing an open circuit. The pump attempted to increase the pressure at the engine by going to full speed which resulted in a high pressure fuel-fed fire. This fire quickly spread to the #2 engine, also on the port side, and then, more slowly, into the bomb-bay area on the port side of the aircraft. The heat of the fire in the bomb bay caused the flight control rods located on the port side of the bomb bay to expand which caused erroneous flight commands to the major flight controls which in turn resulted in the pilots losing control of the aircraft and the eventual order to abandon aircraft. Crew member account.

20 January
A USCG Sikorsky HH-52A Seaguard, 1448, strikes three electrical transmission wires and crashes into the ice-filled Illinois River. The crew had been performing an aerial ice patrol along the Illinois and Mississippi Rivers. The Air Station the aircraft and/or crew were assigned to was AIRSTA Chicago.

10 February
A Boeing Vertol CH-46D Seaknight helicopter BUNO 152537 (HW 02) assigned to a detachment of Helicopter Combat Support Squadron Six (HC-6) from NAS Norfolk embarked with USS San Diego flying a night vertical replenishment (VERTREP) mission to USS Suribachi in poor weather conditions crashes into the Mediterranean Sea 175 km SE of Palma de Majorca. Two pilots and one aircrewman are rescued by shipboard recovery in high winds and heavy seas. A detachment passenger is killed and one aircrewman is lost with the aircraft. This is the second mishap for the detachment on the deployment. One of the pilots was also in the prior accident on 17 December 1976.

11 February
A USAF T 33 Shooting Star crashed near Elma Wa. at 2:30 P.M.. Two pilots on board were killed. The aircraft was assigned to the 318th FIS at McChord AFB, WA.

3 March
Italian Air Force Lockheed C-130H Hercules MM61996 of the 46 Aerobrigata, crashed into Monte Serra, 15 kilometers E of Pisa, Italy.

19 April
Soviet Air Force Antonov AN-24 crashed into the chimney of the Moe distillery in Soviet-occupied Estonia, killing all 21 soldiers on board.

3 May
Shortly after 1100 hrs. English Electric Canberra PR.9 aircraft, XH137, of No. 39 Squadron was returning to its base at RAF Wyton, near Huntingdon, after a routine training flight. About two miles from the end of the runway, it crashed by some houses in the estate of Oxmoor in the village of Hartford, north-east of Huntingdon. Three young children were killed and five people were injured, of whom two are detained in hospital. The two RAF members of the crew were also killed.

3 June
During an aerial demonstration at the Paris Air Show at Le Bourget Airport, Fairchild-Republic chief test pilot Howard R. "Sam" Nelson fails to recover from a loop in Fairchild-Republic A-10 Thunderbolt II, 75-0294, c/n A10-0043, '97', from Davis-Monthan Air Force Base, Arizona, tail strikes runway with airframe in nose-high attitude, aircraft tumbles and disintegrates. Pilot dies en route to hospital.

21 June
USN Lockheed EC-130Q Hercules TACAMO III BuNo 156176 of VQ-3, crashed in the Pacific Ocean after night take-off from Wake Island.

24 June
USN Kaman SH-2F, 149765, 'JA31' tail code; of VX-1 from NAS Patuxent River, MD crashed on the runway on its final approach of the evening as the engine cowl opened in flight obstructing the main rotor blades causing the helicopter to lose control and land on its roof killing all three on board. The aircraft was found with the landing gear still in the down position leaving the bottom of the helicopter totally undamaged. The rest of the helicopter from the floor up was totally crushed due to the aircraft landing upside down.

25 August
A USAF McDonnell-Douglas RF-4C Phantom II, 66-0424, 'AR' tail code, of the 1st Tactical Reconnaissance Squadron, 10th Tactical Reconnaissance Wing, from RAF Alconbury, crashed in a field at Thuine, Germany, 9 nm N of Rheine-Hopsten Air Base, from which it had just departed. Both crew perished and Capt. Alan Aertker, WSO is credited with remaining with the aircraft rather than ejecting to avoid devastation of the village. No civilians were injured or killed in the crash and citizens of Thuine erected a monument near the crash site.

14 September
Boeing EC-135K, 62-3536, converted from KC-135A-BN Stratotanker, part of the 8th Tactical Deployment Control Squadron, based at Seymour Johnson AFB, North Carolina, on a joint training mission, departs Kirtland AFB, New Mexico, after a refuelling stop, makes right turn, crashes into steep terrain in the Manzano Mountains, two miles S of the Four Hills housing development, killing all 20 on board.

27 September

A United States Marine Corps McDonnell Douglas RF-4B Phantom II, BuNo 157344, c/n 3717, 'RF611', of VMFP-2, flown by a USMC crew based at Naval Air Facility Atsugi, en route to USS Midway in Sagami Bay, suffers a mechanical malfunction, the port engine catches fire, and crashes into a residential neighborhood, killing two boys, ages 1 and 3, and injuring seven others, several seriously. The two-man crew of the aircraft, eject and are not seriously injured. The crash destroys several houses. The boys' mother is also severely burned. Due to the fear that she may be adversely affected during her recovery by the shock, she is not told until 29 January 1979, that her sons have died. The mother dies in 1982, aged 31, of complications from her injuries.

3 October
General Dynamics F-111D, 68-0093, delivered to the USAF on 26 January 1972. Originally assigned to 524th TFS 27th TFW. While assigned to the 522nd TFS, the aircraft crashed and was destroyed 1920hrs MST, 37 miles southwest of Clovis on the Alan Parker Ranch near Floyd NM during night practice bombing. No ejection attempt was made.

4 October
First production prototype FMA IA 58 Pucará, AX-03, of the Fuerza Aérea Argentina, crashes during preparations for the 50th Anniversary of the Fabrica Militar de Aviones at Córdoba, due to pilot error.

7 December
Lockheed U-2R, 68-10330, Article 052, second airframe of first R-model order, originally registered N809X, delivered to the 100th Strategic Reconnaissance Wing 25 July 1968. Testbed for Senior Lance and U.S. Navy EP-X trials. To 9th SRW in 1976. Crashed this date at RAF Akrotiri, Cyprus, (Operating Area OH)[Operating Location 'Olive Harvest'], pilot Capt. Robert Henderson killed when he crashes into the Met Office next to the control tower on take-off. Also killed are British duty forecaster Jack Flawn and four locally employed Cypriot staff, as well as 14 other injuries. Fires burn for three hours. The Met Office staff were the first to be killed on duty in peacetime since M. A. Giblett died on the R101 in October 1930.

== 1978 ==
27 March
A USN Grumman F-14A Tomcat, BuNo 158995, 'NK 106', of VF-1, crashes and catapults across scrub grass to come to rest against a concrete highway divider on CA-163, the Cabrillo Freeway, on approach to NAS Miramar, San Diego, California, exploding in flames. Both crew members eject seconds before impact; one fatality, no civilian deaths.°

26 April
Lockheed P-3 Orion, BuNo 152724, 'LJ-04', of VP-23, crashed at sea on landing approach to Lajes, killing seven. Cause of the accident was undetermined due to inability to recover aircraft remains from the extreme depths.

19 May
First prototype Sikorsky YUH-60A Black Hawk, 73-21650, crashes during testing at the Sikorsky plant, Stratford, Connecticut, killing three company personnel. Army investigation reveals that during routine maintenance the night before the fatal flight, the airspeed sensor for the tailplane actuating system was inadvertently left unconnected. As the aircraft transitioned from hover to forward flight, the tailplane did not automatically change its angle and as speed built up, it forced the helicopter's nose down until an attitude was reached from which recovery was impossible. A manual back-up system was available and functioning, and could have been used to correct the tailplane angle, but for unexplained reasons it was not used, possibly due to failure to analyze the nature of the problem in time. Minor modifications are introduced as a result of this accident.

29 May
A USAF Convair F-106A Delta Dart, 59-0144 lost power on takeoff at McChord AFB, Wa. The pilot ejected safely. The jet spun out of control and flipped upside down landing in a pond inside an apartment complex. No one on the ground was injured.

8 June
During ammunition certification tests by the Joint Test Force, Air Force Flight Test Center, Edwards AFB, California, Major (later Major General) Francis C. "Rusty" Gideon Jr. in Fairchild-Republic A-10 Thunderbolt II, 73-1669, call sign Paco 40, makes fourth firing pass of five, 100 rounds per pass, but experiences secondary gun gas ignition in front of the GAU-8 muzzle, causing oxygen starvation of engines necessitating emergency shut-down. Before he can relight the cooling engines, he runs out of altitude and ejects in Escapac ejection seat at 2,000 feet AGL, suffering severe injuries including a broken neck. Aircraft impacts on desert floor, whole sequence filmed from Northrop T-38 Talon chase plane. Pilot is treated at a Palmdale, California hospital, and returns to the A-10 cockpit six months later. Joe Baugher cites crash date of 8 August 1977. https://www.youtube.com/watch?v=mD3Y_Qcqulw&NR=1&feature=fvwp

7 July
Sukhoi Su-27, T10-2, crashes on its second flight, killing test pilot Yevgeny Solovyov. "The cause was shortcomings in the control system."

12 August
Avro Vulcan B.2 registration XL390 of 617 Squadron Royal Air Force crashed during an air display at Naval Air Station Glenview, Illinois, United States, after apparent stall during a wing-over, coming down in landfill just N of Willow Road. All four crew members killed.

14 August
A U.S. Navy Douglas C-117D Skytrain departed NAS Agana, Guam, to fly to Ulithi, with 30 souls aboard, including two rear admirals, 13 members of the Navy Band, and four Department of the Interior officials, who were on a mission to visit the Trust Territories. About 130 miles out, the right engine's oil pressure dropped, and the pilots shut the engine down and turned back to Guam. Prior to takeoff they had not factored in heat and humidity to the airplane performance, and so were now too heavy to maintain altitude on one engine. In trying to maintain altitude, they slowed to 100 MPH, which made them sink even faster. They ditched 8 miles from the southern tip of Guam. The pilot failed to use flaps to lower his speed during landing, and landed with a 15 MPH tailwind, contributing to a hard landing, the aircraft nose tearing off, and two fatalities.

22 September
A U.S. Navy Lockheed P-3B Orion, BuNo 152757 of VP-8 on flight out of Naval Air Station Brunswick, Maine, at 1205 hrs. en route to Trenton, Ontario for display at an air show, explodes in the air eight-ten minutes later and comes down over Poland, Maine. Cause is thought to be failure of number one (port outer) engine nacelle due to "whirl-mode" in turbulence; engine separates along with 11 feet of outer port wing, strikes and shears off the port horizontal stabilizer. Aerodynamic forces then cause loss of other three engines, starboard wing fails at fuselage, which rolls inverted and impacts ground. Much of the debris comes down near the intersection of Route 11 and Megquier Hill Road, but pieces are scattered in a wide area around the site. No homes are hit, but the nearest residences to the wreckage are only a few hundred feet away. The blast blows out some of the windows in a nearby house. The eight crew are killed while flying (KWF): Lt. Commander Francis W. Dupont Jr., Lt. j.g. Donald E. Merz, Aide-de-camp Larry R. Miller, Lt. j.g. George D. Nuttelman, Aviation ASW Operator 3rd Class Robert I. Phillips, Aviation ASW Operator 3rd Class James A. Piepkorn, Aviation ASW Operator Striker Paul.G. Schulz, and Lt. j.g. Ernest A. Smith.

28 September
Grumman EA-6B Prowler BuNo. 158817/'NE' of VAQ-137, US Navy, on board the USS Ranger. Crashed and destroyed 28 September 1978: Night catapult launch off the USS Ranger on workups. Flew into the water about 7 miles from the carrier, after launch. Crashed into the Pacific Ocean 110 miles west of San Diego, California. Pilot and ECMO 2 killed on impact. Crew were named as (Pilot) Lt Commander Clark Bruce (killed), ECMO 1 Lt Commander W. L. Waterman (seat fired on impact and he survived) and ECMO 2 Lt (jg) John R. Babione (killed)

3 October
A Finnish Air Force Douglas C-47A, DO-10, crashed shortly after takeoff from Kuopio Airport, killing all 15 people on board. The plane suffered an engine failure, stalled during a turn back towards the airport and impacted Lake Juurusvesi.

6 October
A United States Navy Douglas C-118B Liftmaster, BuNo 131618, assigned to Fleet Logistics Support Squadron 52 (VR-52) crashes into a fog-shrouded hill 35 km south of Santiago de Chile, Chile. All 18 people on board are killed.

19 October
A USAF Boeing B-52D Stratofortress, 56-0594, of the 22d Bomb Wing, crashes at 0730 hrs. in light fog in a plowed field ~2.5 miles SE of March AFB, near the rural community of Sunnymead, California, shortly after take-off. Five crew killed, but one is able to escape the burning wreckage and was reported in stable condition at the base hospital. Traffic was disrupted on nearby Interstate 15E.

26 October
A USAF LTV A-7D Corsair II, 69-6240, of the 355th TFW, on a flight from Tinker AFB, Oklahoma, crashes on approach to its home station, Davis-Monthan AFB, Arizona, coming down on Highland Avenue between a University of Arizona athletic practice field and Mansfield Junior High School in Tucson. Two University of Arizona students, Leticia Felix Humphrey, 21, a business education major, and her sister, Clarissa Felix, 20, majoring in early education, were driving down Highland in Leticia's car when the plane hit and engulfed it in flames. Leticia died there at the scene of the crash and Clarissa died shortly after. At least five other civilians were less seriously injured. The pilot, Capt. Frederick Ashler, 28, ejected safely after aiming his jet at the practice field. His ejection resulted in the plane veering to the right and striking the road and car, instead.

7 November
USN Douglas A-4F Skyhawk Blue Angel, BuNo 155056, crashes during pre-show exhibition at NAS Miramar, San Diego, California. Pilot, Lt. Mike Curtin, dead on impact, no ejection.

23 November
Royal Navy McDonnell Douglas Phantom FG.1, XT598, of 111 Squadron, written off on approach to Leuchars this date.

Mid-December
Prototype Myasishchev M-17-1 Chayka high-altitude interceptor, painted in Aeroflot colours and bearing civil registration CCCP-17100, becomes accidentally airborne during initial taxi trial at Kumertau, when, in poor visibility, the starboard aileron accidentally lowered and aircraft turned abruptly. Pilot, Kir Chernobrovkin, takes off to avoid snow heap, but wingtip subsequently hits hillside and the prototype was destroyed, pilot KWF.

== 1979 ==
23 January
Aeronautica Militare Italiana, Italian Air Force Lockheed C-130H Hercules MM62000, '46-14', of the 46 Aerobrigata, jumped chocks during engine run-up, hit tree, written-off. Parts used to support c/n 4491, MM61995 damaged in hard landing, Pisa, January 1999. Hull at Milan-Malpensa, Italy, December 1979, 1989.

1 February
Pakistani Air Force Lockheed C-130B Hercules 23488, jumped chocks during night engine test run, collided with C-130E 10687, c/n 4117, former USAF 65-10687, coded 'D'. Both written off, hulls at Lahore, June 1981.

20 April
Two USAF General Dynamics F-111Fs of the 48th Tactical Fighter Wing, 70-2367 and 73-0714 based at RAF Lakenheath, suffer mid-air collision off the Scottish coast while on a training mission over the Dornoch Firth's Tain bombing range, all four crew surviving in what was described as a double "miracle" escape. Both crews escape in each plane's two-seat crew ejection modules. Flotation bags on the Peluso/Schlitt module became partially dislodged soon after landing and the module submerged under several feet of water. The other crew module became inverted immediately after hitting the water and remained inverted on the water's surface until the arrival of a fishing vessel. At that time the crew activated self-righting bags that partially righted the module. The crew then exited the module and, assisted by a RAF rescue parajumper, climbed aboard the fishing vessel before being hoisted to a RAF rescue helicopter. The fishing vessel arrived in the area of the crew modules approximately 40 minutes after the collision, with the rescue helicopter from RAF Lossiemouth arriving several minutes later. A Nimrod maritime patrol plane monitored from overhead. All four crew were flown by helicopter to RAF Lossiemouth, 40 miles NE of Inverness. All four returned to Lakenheath later that day. They were identified as Capt. Stephen R. Ruttman, of Norman, Oklahoma, Capt. Timothy A. Schlitt, of Afton, Missouri, Capt. Roger L. Webb, of Staunton, Virginia, and Capt. Joseph Peluso, of Rosedale, New York, all of them 28.

27 May
A de Havilland Canada DHC-5 Buffalo of the Mauritania Islamic Air Force crashed in the sea off the coast of Dakar, Senegal. All 12 occupants died in the accident, including the Prime Minister of Mauritania Ahmed Ould Bouceif.

23 August
Mikoyan-Gurevich MiG-17F, 002, of the USAF 4477th Test & Evaluation Squadron, Groom Lake, Nevada is lost due to pilot induced loss of control. Pilot Lt. M. Hugh Brown, USN, 31, of VX-4, "Bandit 12", originally of Roanoke, Virginia, enters spin while engaging adversary, U.S. Navy Northrop F-5 Freedom Fighter, recovers, but enters second spin too close to ground, irrecoverable, impacts at steep angle near Tonopah airfield boundary, killed instantly. No bail-out attempted.

3 September
Two Convair F-106 Delta Darts of the 186th Fighter-Interceptor Squadron, 120th Fighter-Interceptor Group, Montana Air National Guard, out of Great Falls Airport, perform a pair of a flyovers in Dillon, Montana in conjunction with the town's Labor Day parade. One Delta Dart, F-106A-70-CO, 57-2458, c/n 8-24-41, piloted by Capt. Joel Rude, clips a grain elevator with its port wing. The pilot unsuccessfully attempts to eject and is killed. Forty others are injured by debris and fire but Capt. Rude is the only fatality. On 7 September 2009, a commemorative plaque is dedicated in Dillon in the pilot's memory.

9 September
Two RAF Hawker-Siddeley Harrier GR.3s, XV757, piloted by former Red Arrows leader Wing Commander Richard Duckett, and XZ128, piloted by Flight Lieutenant C. Gowers, both of 1 Squadron, collide in midair over Wisbech, Cambs., UK. Both pilots eject but wreckage comes down on town, one impacting on Ramnoth Road, destroying three houses and killing former Wisbech Mayor Bill Trumpess, Bob Bowers, and his son Jonathon Bowers, aged 2. The other airframe impacts in New Drove on the outskirts of town, fortunately without further casualties.

12 December
USAF General Dynamics F-111E, 68-0045, of the 79th TFS, 20th TFW, based at RAF Upper Heyford, crashed in the sea off Wainfleet Range, UK, during night bombing practice, range staff witnessing it dive into the water before the crew could eject. Pilot Capt. R.P. Gaspard and Maj. F.B. Slusher killed while flying (KWF). Gale force conditions prevented discovery of any wreckage for two days. 12See also
12 December
LTJG Gary Scott Shaw (pilot) and LTJG Kenneth Martin Bates (B/N) were killed when their VA-165 KA-6D tanker crashed immediately after launching from USS Constellation off the coast of San Diego, California. Suspected cause was malfunctioning elevator actuators.

18 December
A Sikorsky HH-3E Jolly Green Giant rescue helicopter of the 67th Aerospace Rescue and Recovery Squadron United States Air Force (USAF), from the Iceland Defense Force at Naval Air Station Keflavik, crashes in the Mosfellsheiði heath shortly after taking of from the crash site of a Cessna F172M Skyhawk that had crashed four hours earlier. Rescuers who arrived at the scene minutes later, managed to prevent a fire in the wreckage by cutting main power of the helicopter, saving the five-man U.S. crew, two Icelandic doctors and three of the injured from the previous accident.

== See also ==
- List of accidents and incidents involving military aircraft
- List of C-130 Hercules crashes
