= Andrés Ingi Jónsson =

Icelandic politician (born 1979)

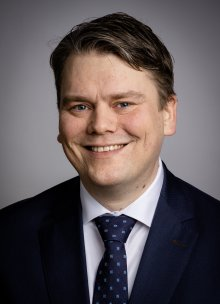

Member of Parliament for Reykjavík North
- In office 29 October 2016 – 30 November 2024

Personal details
- Born: 16 August 1979 (age 47) Reykjavík, Iceland
- Party: Pirate Party
- Education: University of Sussex, University of Iceland

Andrés Ingi Jónsson (born 16 August 1979) is an Icelandic MP, who represented Reykjavík North as a member of the Pirate Party from 2017 to 2024. He was first elected to the Alþingi in 2016 as a member of the Left-Green Movement and again in 2017, later leaving the party in protest.

He has an MA in War, Violence and Security from the University of Sussex and a BA in Philosophy from the University of Iceland. After his studies, he worked as a journalist and a committee secretary for the Constitutional Council.

== Political focus ==
Andrés Ingi joined the Left-Green Movement during the 2009 Icelandic financial crisis protests and took a seat on the party's ticket for the 2009 elections. During the time of the 2009-2013 left-wing government, Andrés worked as the political advisor to both the Minister of Health and the Minister for the Environment. He first took a temporary seat in parliament in the summer of 2015, as a substitute for Steinunn Þóra Árnadóttir, later winning a permanent seat in the 2016 elections.

In April 2019, Andrés proposed a bill to hold a referendum on withdrawal from NATO membership. In late-2019, he left the party in protest over the government coalition agreement, stating that "often compromises have fallen far short of our ideals."

In October 2020, he proposed a bill to lower the voting age in Iceland to 16. In November 2020, he announced he would be introducing a bill to lower the speed limit in urban areas from 50 km/h to 30 km/h. In December 2020, he proposed a bill to make menstrual products free in Iceland. The bill was defeated in Parliament by a vote of 27 against to 26 for.

In January 2021, he called to amend the law on gender recognition to abolish the 9,000 ISK fee. Later that month, he supported a bill that would have made Holocaust denial illegal in Iceland. After sitting as an independent for a year and a half, he joined the Pirate Party in February 2021. In May 2021, he criticised the Directorate of Immigration for evicting refugees who had refused to participate in pre-deportation COVID screening from refugee centres.
