= Ásta B. Þorsteinsdóttir =

Icelandic politician (1945–1998)

Ásta B. Þorsteinsdóttir (ÁÞ)

Member of the Althing
- In office 27 January 1998 – 12 October 1998
- Preceded by: Jón Baldvin Hannibalsson
- Succeeded by: Magnús Árni Magnússon
- Constituency: Reykjavík

Personal details
- Born: 1 December 1945 Reykjavík, Iceland
- Died: 12 October 1998 (aged 52) Reykjavík, Iceland
- Party: Social Democratic Party

Ásta Bryndís Þorsteinsdóttir (1 December 1945 – 12 October 1998) was an Icelandic politician and member of the Althing. A member of the Social Democratic Party, she represented the Reykjavík constituency from January 1998 to October 1998.

Ásta was born on 1 December 1945 in Reykjavík. She was the daughter of fisherman Þorsteinn Þorsteinsson and clerk Ásdís Eyjólfsdóttir. She received a degree in nursing from the Icelandic School of Nursing (HÍ) in 1968. She also studied nursing administration at the New School of Nursing from 1987 to 1988 and surgical nursing in Iceland and Denmark.

Ásta was a nurse at the Reykjavík City Hospital (1968–1969); a psychiatric nurse (1971) and surgical nurse (1972–1980) in Aarhus, mostly at the Aarhus Municipal Hospital; a nurse in the outpatient department (1980–1981), a surgical nurse (1982–1988) and a nursing manager (1988-1997) at the National Hospital. She was a member of the board of the National Association of Developmental Aid, an umbrella organisation of groups that work for the rights and interests of disabled people from 1985 to 1995 and served as its chair from 1987 to 1995.

Ásta was a substitute member of the Althing for Jón Baldvin Hannibalsson in October 1995, from May 1996 to June 1996, from November 1996 to December 1996 and from November 1997 to December 1997. She was appointed to the Althing in January 1998 following Jón Baldvin's resignation. She died on 12 October 1998 at her home in Reykjavík. She was replaced by Magnús Árni Magnússon in the Althing.

Ásta married doctor Ástráður B. Hreiðarsson in 1966 and had two sons and a daughter.

Electoral history of Ásta B. Þorsteinsdóttir
Election	Constituency	Party	Votes	Result
1995 parliamentary	Reykjavík	Social Democratic Party	7,458	Not elected
