= Grímur Grímsson =

Icelandic politician

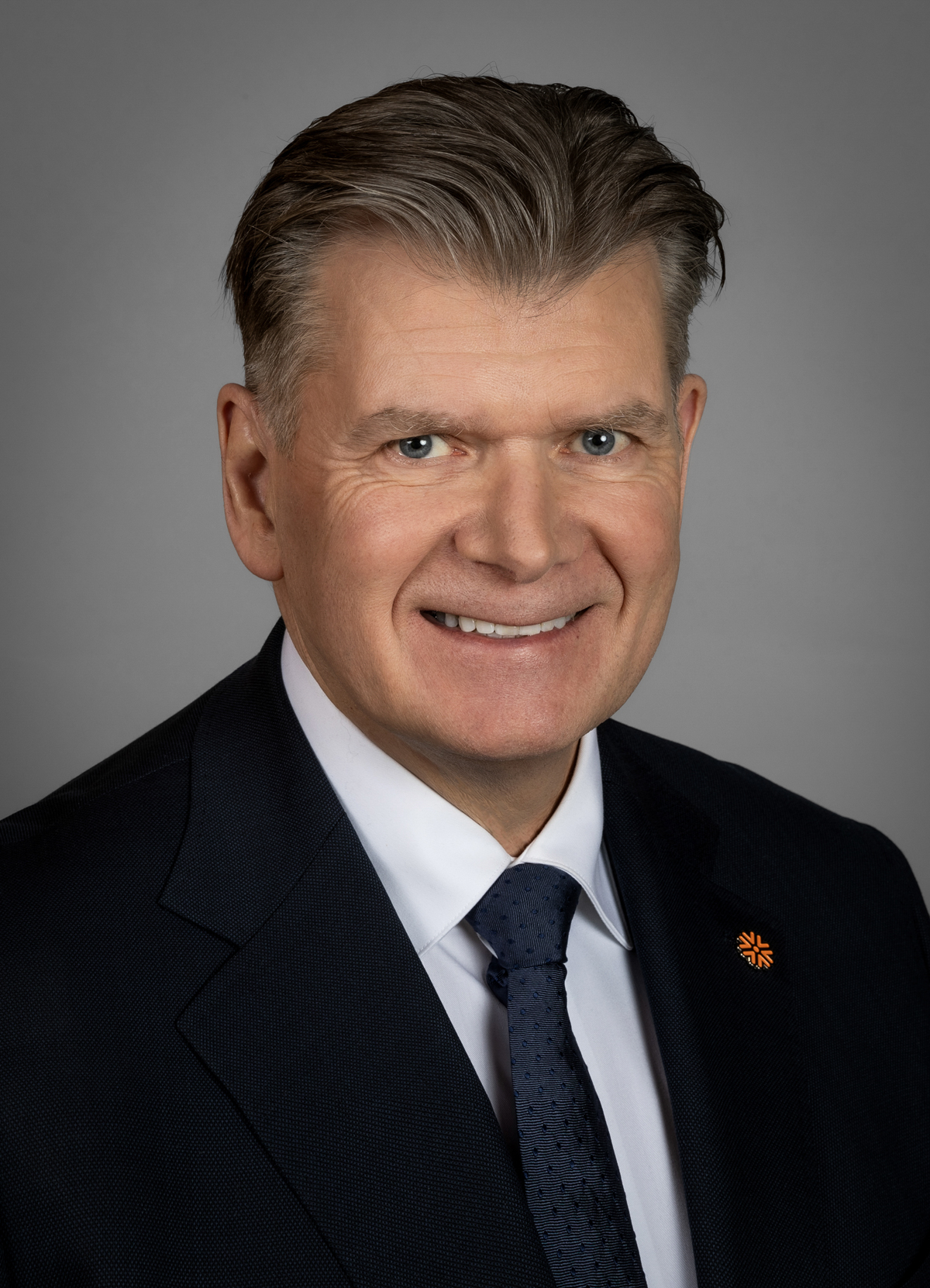

Member of the Althing
- Incumbent
- Assumed office 2024
- Constituency: Reykjavík North

Personal details
- Party: Viðreisn

Grímur Grímsson is an Icelandic politician from the Viðreisn party. In the 2024 Icelandic parliamentary election he was elected to the Althing.

He was a police officer for 40 years. He became the head of the police's central investigation department in February 2021.

== See also ==
- List of members of the Althing, 2024–2028
