= Ásta Júlía Grímsdóttir =

Icelandic basketball player

No. 15 – Njarðvík
- Position: Forward
- League: Úrvalsdeild kvenna

Personal information
- Born: 22 February 2001 (age 25) Iceland
- Listed height: 185 cm (6 ft 1 in)

Career information
- College: HBU (2019–2020)
- Playing career: 2015–present

Career history
- 2015–2017: KR
- 2017–2019: Valur
- 2020–2026: Valur
- 2026–present: Njarðvík

Career highlights
- 3× Icelandic champion (2019, 2021, 2023); Icelandic Cup (2019); Icelandic Super Cup (2026); Icelandic D1 Young Player of the Year (2017)

Ásta Júlía Grímsdóttir (born 22 February 2001) is an Icelandic basketball player for Njarðvík of the Úrvalsdeild kvenna. She won the Icelandic championship in 2019, 2021 and 2023 and the Icelandic Cup in 2019 as a member of Valur.

== Playing career ==
=== KR ===
Ásta Júlía came up through the junior programs of KR and played two season for the club in the second-tier 1. deild kvenna. In 2017 she was named the 1. deild kvenna Young Player of the Year after averaging 9.9 points, 8.6 rebounds and 2.1 blocks per game.

=== Valur ===
After the 2016–2017 season, Ásta Júlía signed with Valur of the top-tier Úrvalsdeild kvenna. She helped the team to the Úrvalsdeild finals in 2018 where it lost to Haukar, 3–2.

She had a breakout season in 2018–2019, averaging 8.8 points and 7.3 rebounds, and helping Valur to the best record in the league. On 16 February 2019, she won the Icelandic Cup after Valur defeated Stjarnan in the Cup finals, 74–90. On 27 April, Ásta Júlía helped Valur win the national championship for the first time in the team's history.

=== Houston Baptist Huskies ===
In March 2019, Ásta Júlía agreed to join the Houston Baptist Huskies women's basketball team.

=== Return to Iceland ===
On 23 September 2020, Ásta Júlía signed a 2-year contract with Valur. On 2 June 2021, she won the national championship after Valur beat Haukar 3–0 in the Úrvalsdeild finals.

On 28 April 2023, she won her third Icelandic championship after Valur defeated top-seeded Keflavík in the Úrvalsdeild finals, 3–1.

On 19 December 2025 she was chosen as center/forward for the team of the season, after the first 12 games, by pundits at the TV program Bónus körfuboltakvöld.

In 2026, she signed with Njarðvík after 6 seasons with Valur. On 26 September 2026, she won her first Super Cup win after Njarðvík defeated Keflavík 83–78.

== National team career ==
Ásta Júlía has played 14 games, 2 friendly and 12 FIBA, for the senior national team of Iceland.

Ásta Júlía played 17 games for the Icelandic national U-16 team from 2016 to 2017. In June 2016, she was named to the All-First team during the Nordic Championships. In 2017, she averaged 11.3 points and 14.6 rebounds for Iceland during the U16 Women's European Championship Division B.

In 2018, she appeared in 13 games for the Icelandic national U-18 team.

In 2019 she appeared in 12 games for the Icelandic national U-18 team. At the FIBA European Champions division B she played 7 games averaging 14,4 PPG, 9,4 RPG and 15,4 EFF.

== Personal life ==
Ásta is the daughter of Helga Vala Helgadóttir lawyer, and former Icelandic parliament member, and Grímur Atlason, general manager of Geðhjálp, a politician and former manager of the Iceland Airwaves music festival. In August 2024, Ásta Júlía began her studies in medicine at the University of Iceland.
