= Tómas A. Tómasson =

Icelandic politician (born 1949)

Tómas Andrés Tómasson
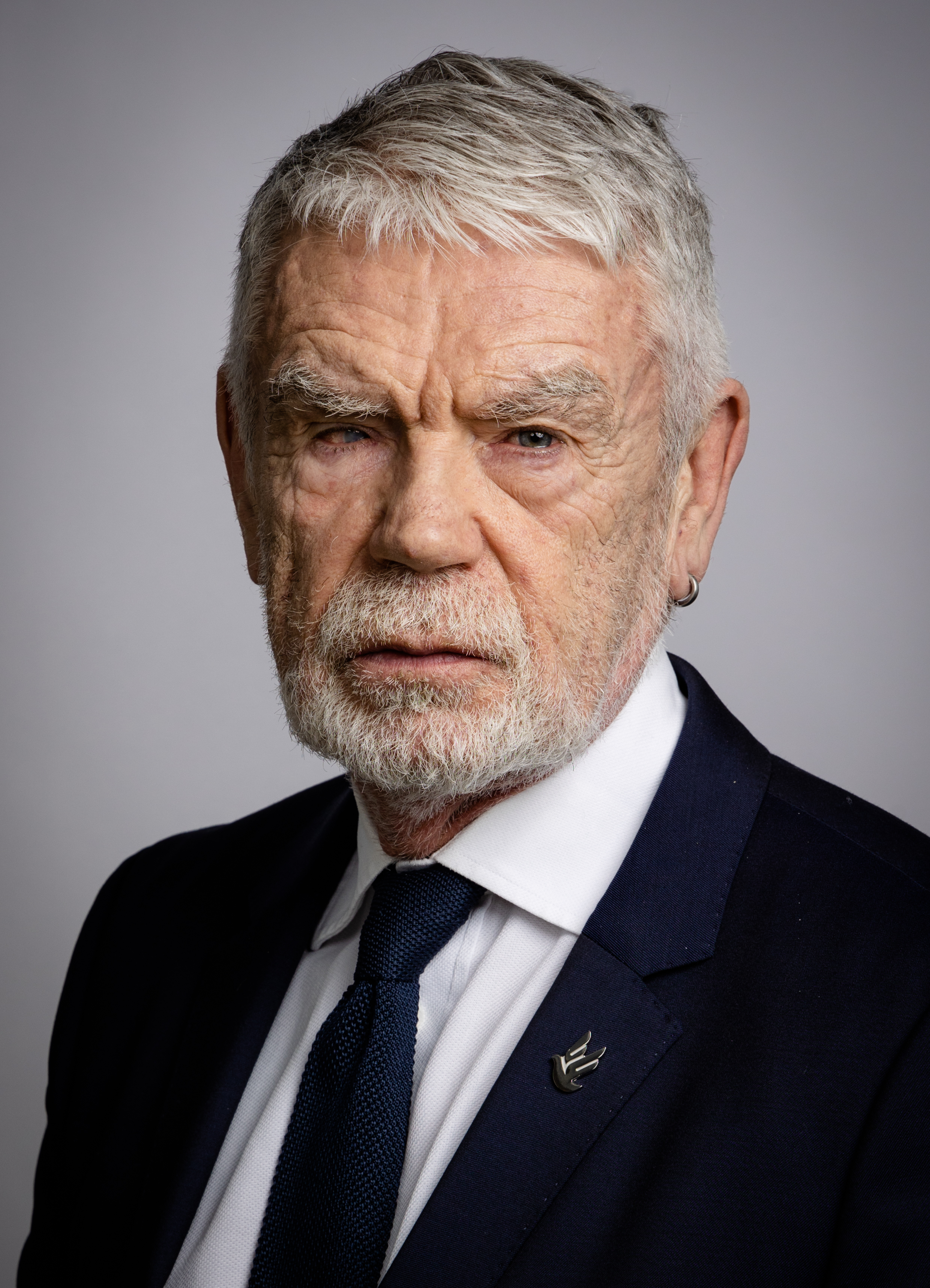

Member of the Althing
- In office 25 September 2021 – 30 November 2024
- Constituency: Reykjavík North

Personal details
- Born: 4 April 1949 (age 77) Reykjavík, Iceland
- Party: People's Party
- Education: Florida International University (BS, MA)
- Profession: Restaurateur

Tómas Andrés Tómasson (born 4 April 1949), commonly known as Tommi, is an Icelandic politician, restaurateur and one of the owners and founders of Tommi's Burger Joint restaurant chain. He previously ran a chain of hamburger places under the name Tommaborgarar, one of the first fast food chains in Iceland. In September 2021, Tómas was elected as a member Althing, representing the People's Party. He is the oldest first-time elected member in Alþingi's history.

== Early life ==
Tómas was born in Reykjavík, Iceland. In June 1979, he graduated from Florida International University with a Bachelors of Science degree in Hotel and Restaurant Management. He then earned his Masters of Arts degree in Culinary Arts in 1980.

== Catering ==
Tommi ran the restaurant Festi in Grindavík from 1974 to 1977. After completing his studies in the hotel and restaurant business in the United States, he founded Tommaborgar in 1981. After three years, Tómas sold Tommaborgar and focused on running Hard Rock Café and Hótel Borg. In 1996 he founded Kaffibrennslan which he ran until 2002.

On 14 March 2004, 23 years after the opening of Tommaborgarar, Tommi opened a new burger place called Tommi's Burger Joint.
