= Heimildin =

Icelandic newspaper

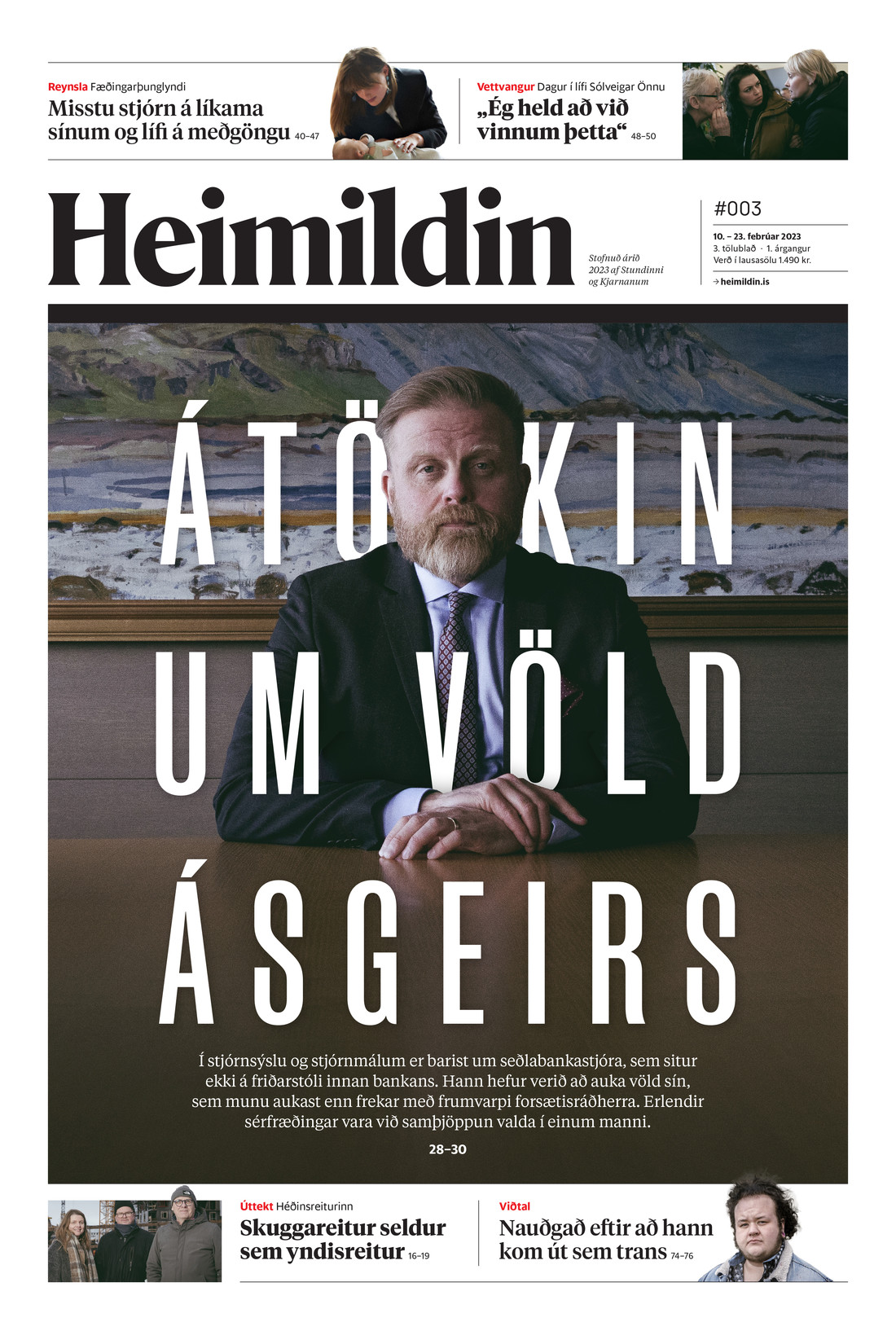
- Heimildin cover of February 10, 2023
- Editor: Ingibjörg Dögg Kjartansdóttir
- Categories: Online newspaper, News magazine
- Frequency: Weekly
- Publisher: Sameinaða útgáfufélagið
- First issue: January 13, 2023
- Country: Iceland
- Based in: Reykjavík
- Language: Icelandic
- Website: heimildin.is (in Icelandic)

Heimildin is an Icelandic monthly newspaper known for investigative journalism. It was founded in January 2023 with the merge of Stundin and Kjarninn. The chief editors of the paper were originally Ingibjörg Dögg Kjartansdóttir and Þórður Snær Júlíusson. It downsized its operations in 2025 and transitioned from weekly to monthly issuance.
