= Reykjavík North (Althing constituency) =

Constituency of the Althing, the national legislature of Iceland

- Reykjavík norður
- Constituency for the Althing
- Location of Reykjavík North within Iceland
- Municipality: Reykjavík
- Region: Capital
- Electorate: 47,600 (2024)

Current Constituency
- Created: 2003
- Seats: 9 (2003–present) (Note: Excludes compensatory seats.)
- Member of the Althing: List: Dagbjört Hákonardóttir (S); Dagur B. Eggertsson (S); Diljá Mist Einarsdóttir (D); Grímur Grímsson (C); Guðlaugur Þór Þórðarson (D); Hanna Katrín Friðriksson (C); Kristrún Frostadóttir (S); Pawel Bartoszek (C); Ragnar Þór Ingólfsson (F); Sigríður Á. Andersen (M); Þórður Snær Júlíusson (S)
- Created from: Reykjavík

Reykjavík North (Icelandic: Reykjavík norður) is one of the six multi-member constituencies of the Althing, the national legislature of Iceland. The constituency was established in 2003 when the existing Reykjavík constituency was split into two. The constituency currently elects nine of the 63 members of the Althing using the open party-list proportional representation electoral system. At the 2024 parliamentary election it had 47,600 registered electors.

== History ==
In March 1843 King Christian VIII of Denmark issued a royal decree converting the Althing into a consultative assembly. It consisted of 20 members popularly elected from single-member constituencies, one of which was Reykjavík. In the subsequent decades the electoral process, size of Althing and constituencies changed several times. Reykjavík became a two-member constituency in 1903 (effective 1904). In 1920 (effective 1923) it became a four-member constituency using proportional representation. It became a six-member constituency in 1934 and an eight-member constituency in 1942.

One of the main reasons for the changes was the shift in population from rural to urban areas, particularly Reykjavík. The changes however always lagged behind population shifts. This resulted in rural constituencies being over-represented in the Althing. The disproportion in the voting power of rural and urban voters was as high as 10:1 by the mid-20th century. The overrepresentation of rural constituencies favoured the Progressive Party, whose support base was mostly farmers. The party was over-represented in Althing even after the introduction of compensatory seats (equalisation seas) in 1934.

The constituencies were radically altered in 1959 when the single and two-member constituencies were abolished and replaced by seven multi-member constituencies using proportional representation. The number of seats allocated to Reykjavík was increased from 8 to 12 at the same time. This reduced the disproportion in the voting power of rural and urban voters to 3:1.

In September 1997 Prime Minister Davíð Oddsson appointed a committee headed by Friðrik Klemenz Sophusson to review the division of constituencies in Iceland and the organisation of elections. The committee's report was published in October 1998 and recommended, amongst other things, that the number of constituencies be reduced and that they be more equal in population size. The Althing passed an amendment to the constitution in June 1999 which removed the reference to specific eight constituencies contained within Article 31 and instead simply stated that there would be six or seven constituencies and that the Althing would determine the boundaries between the constituencies. The amendment also required that if, following an election to Althing, the number of registered electors per seat (including compensatory seats) in any constituency is less than half of that in another constituency, the National Electoral Commission shall change the allocation of seats so as to reduce the imbalance. This reduced the disproportion in the voting power of rural and urban voters to 2:1.

Reykjavík North was one of six constituencies (kjördæmi) established by the "Elections to the Althing Act no. 24/2000" (Lög um kosningar til Alþingis, nr. 24/2000) passed by the Althing in May 2000. The Act required that, when an election to Althing had been called, the National Electoral Commission had to determine the boundaries between the Reykjavík North and Reykjavík South constituencies so that the number of registered electors per seat (including compensatory seats) is approximately the same. The Act initially allocated eleven seats to the constituency - nine constituency seats and two compensatory seats.

== Electoral system ==
Reykjavík North currently elects nine of the 63 members of the Althing using the open party-list proportional representation electoral system. Constituency seats are allocated using the D'Hondt method. Compensatory seats (equalisation seats) are calculated based on the national vote and are allocated using the D'Hondt method at the constituency level. Only parties that reach the 5% national threshold compete for compensatory seats.

== Election results ==
=== Summary ===
Election	Left-Green V / U			Social Democrats S			People's F			Pirate P / Þ			Viðreisn C			Progressive B			Independence D			Centre M		
Election	Votes	%	Seats	Votes	%	Seats	Votes	%	Seats	Votes	%	Seats	Votes	%	Seats	Votes	%	Seats	Votes	%	Seats	Votes	%	Seats
2024	1,080	2.92%	0	9,653	26.08%	3	4,400	11.89%	1	2,006	5.42%	0	6,043	16.32%	2	1,492	4.03%	0	6,459	17.45%	2	3,284	8.87%	1
2021	5,597	15.94%	2	4,427	12.61%	1	2,694	7.67%	1	4,508	12.84%	1	2,706	7.71%	1	4,329	12.33%	1	7,353	20.94%	2	1,234	3.51%	0
2017	7,727	21.54%	3	4,575	12.75%	1	2,546	7.10%	0	4,887	13.62%	1	3,013	8.40%	1	1,901	5.30%	0	8,109	22.60%	3	2,509	6.99%	0
2016	7,318	20.92%	2	1,822	5.21%	0	1,321	3.78%	0	6,663	19.04%	2	4,064	11.62%	1	1,988	5.68%	0	8,539	24.41%	3			
2013	5,493	15.67%	2	4,996	14.25%	1				2,407	6.87%	0				5,759	16.43%	2	8,187	23.36%	3			
2009	8,432	24.01%	2	11,568	32.94%	3										3,375	9.61%	1	7,508	21.38%	2			
2007	5,928	16.92%	2	10,248	29.24%	3										2,186	6.24%	0	12,760	36.41%	4			
2003	3,537	9.79%	1	13,110	36.27%	4										4,199	11.62%	1	12,833	35.50%	3			

(Excludes compensatory seats.)

=== Detailed ===
==== 2020s ====
===== 2024 =====
Results of the 2024 parliamentary election held on 30 November 2024:

Party		Votes	%	Seats		
Party		Votes	%	Con.	Com.	Tot.
Social Democratic Alliance	S	9,653	26.08%	3	1	4
Independence Party	D	6,459	17.45%	2	0	2
Viðreisn	C	6,043	16.32%	2	1	3
People's Party	F	4,400	11.89%	1	0	1
Centre Party	M	3,284	8.87%	1	0	1
Socialist Party of Iceland	J	2,194	5.93%	0	0	0
Pirate Party	P	2,006	5.42%	0	0	0
Progressive Party	B	1,492	4.03%	0	0	0
Left-Green Movement	V	1,080	2.92%	0	0	0
Democratic Party	L	367	0.99%	0	0	0
Responsible Future	Y	42	0.11%	0	0	0
Valid votes		37,020	100.00%	9	2	11
Blank votes		399	1.06%			
Rejected votes – other		81	0.22%			
Total polled		37,500	78.78%			
Registered electors		47,600				

The following candidates were elected:

- Constituency seats - Dagur B. Eggertsson (S), 7,181.25 votes; Diljá Mist Einarsdóttir (D), 4,845.25 votes; Guðlaugur Þór Þórðarson (D), 6,247.00 votes; Hanna Katrín Friðriksson (C), 6,027.33 votes; Kristrún Frostadóttir (S), 9,598.62 votes; Pawel Bartoszek (C), 4,944.83 votes; Ragnar Þór Ingólfsson (F), 4,387.67 votes; Sigríður Á. Andersen (M), 3,242.33 votes; and Þórður Snær Júlíusson (S), 7,185.75 votes.
- Compensatory seats - Dagbjört Hákonardóttir (S), 6,237.62; and Grímur Grímsson (C), 4,029.67 votes.

===== 2021 =====
Results of the 2021 parliamentary election held on 25 September 2021:

Party		Votes	%	Seats		
Party		Votes	%	Con.	Com.	Tot.
Independence Party	D	7,353	20.94%	2	0	2
Left-Green Movement	V	5,597	15.94%	2	0	2
Pirate Party	P	4,508	12.84%	1	1	2
Social Democratic Alliance	S	4,427	12.61%	1	1	2
Progressive Party	B	4,329	12.33%	1	0	1
Viðreisn	C	2,706	7.71%	1	0	1
People's Party	F	2,694	7.67%	1	0	1
Socialist Party of Iceland	J	1,976	5.63%	0	0	0
Centre Party	M	1,234	3.51%	0	0	0
Liberal Democratic Party	O	150	0.43%	0	0	0
Responsible Future	Y	144	0.41%	0	0	0
Valid votes		35,118	100.00%	9	2	11
Blank votes		483	1.35%			
Rejected votes – other		127	0.36%			
Total polled		35,728	78.76%			
Registered electors		45,361				

The following candidates were elected:

- Constituency seats - Ásmundur Einar Daðason (B), 4,322.33 votes; Diljá Mist Einarsdóttir (D), 5,466.75 votes; Guðlaugur Þór Þórðarson (D), 7,269.50 votes; Halldóra Mogensen (P); 4,466.75 votes; Helga Vala Helgadóttir (S), 4,370.75 votes; Katrín Jakobsdóttir (V), 5,592.75 votes; Steinunn Þóra Árnadóttir (V), 4,190.75 votes; Tómas A. Tómasson (F), 2,691.67 votes; and Þorbjörg Sigríður Gunnlaugsdóttir (C), 2,703.00 votes.
- Compensatory seats - Andrés Ingi Jónsson (P), 3,368.00 votes; and Jóhann Páll Jóhannsson (S). 3,323.00 votes.

==== 2010s ====
===== 2017 =====
Results of the 2017 parliamentary election held on 28 October 2017:

Party		Votes	%	Seats		
Party		Votes	%	Con.	Com.	Tot.
Independence Party	D	8,109	22.60%	3	0	3
Left-Green Movement	V	7,727	21.54%	3	0	3
Pirate Party	P	4,887	13.62%	1	1	2
Social Democratic Alliance	S	4,575	12.75%	1	0	1
Viðreisn	C	3,013	8.40%	1	0	1
People's Party	F	2,546	7.10%	0	1	1
Centre Party	M	2,509	6.99%	0	0	0
Progressive Party	B	1,901	5.30%	0	0	0
Bright Future	A	506	1.41%	0	0	0
People's Front of Iceland	R	105	0.29%	0	0	0
Valid votes		35,878	100.00%	9	2	11
Blank votes		711	1.94%			
Rejected votes – other		144	0.39%			
Total polled		36,733	79.73%			
Registered electors		46,073				

The following candidates were elected:

- Constituency seats - Andrés Ingi Jónsson (V), 5,144.83 votes; Áslaug Arna Sigurbjörnsdóttir (D), 6,612.67 votes; Birgir Ármannsson (D), 5,418.00 votes; Guðlaugur Þór Þórðarson (D), 7,991.17 votes; Helga Vala Helgadóttir (S), 4,542.67 votes; Helgi Hrafn Gunnarsson (P), 4,878.75 votes; Katrín Jakobsdóttir (V), 7,723.83 votes; Steinunn Þóra Árnadóttir (V), 6,434.67 votes; and Þorsteinn Víglundsson (C), 2,994.33 votes.
- Compensatory seats - Halldóra Mogensen (P); 3,637.50 votes; and Ólafur Ísleifsson (F), 2,539.33 votes.

===== 2016 =====
Results of the 2016 parliamentary election held on 29 October 2016:

Party		Votes	%	Seats		
Party		Votes	%	Con.	Com.	Tot.
Independence Party	D	8,539	24.41%	3	0	3
Left-Green Movement	V	7,318	20.92%	2	1	3
Pirate Party	P	6,663	19.04%	2	1	3
Viðreisn	C	4,064	11.62%	1	0	1
Bright Future	A	2,673	7.64%	1	0	1
Progressive Party	B	1,988	5.68%	0	0	0
Social Democratic Alliance	S	1,822	5.21%	0	0	0
People's Party	F	1,321	3.78%	0	0	0
Dawn	T	496	1.42%	0	0	0
People's Front of Iceland	R	104	0.30%	0	0	0
Valid votes		34,988	100.00%	9	2	11
Blank votes		700	1.95%			
Rejected votes – other		175	0.49%			
Total polled		35,863	77.88%			
Registered electors		46,051				

The following candidates were elected:

- Constituency seats - Áslaug Arna Sigurbjörnsdóttir (D), 7,040.50 vtes; Birgir Ármannsson (D), 5,690.00 votes; Birgitta Jónsdóttir (P), 6,464.17 votes; Björn Leví Gunnarsson (P), 5,570.50 votes; Björt Ólafsdóttir (A), 2,655.33 votes; Guðlaugur Þór Þórðarson (D), 8,390.33 votes; Katrín Jakobsdóttir (V), 7,315.33 votes; Steinunn Þóra Árnadóttir (V), 6,092.33 votes; and Þorsteinn Víglundsson (C), 4,011.67 votes.
- Compensatory seats - Andrés Ingi Jónsson (V), 4,870.00 votes; and Halldóra Mogensen (P); 4,452.50 votes.

===== 2013 =====
Results of the 2013 parliamentary election held on 27 April 2013:

Party		Votes	%	Seats		
Party		Votes	%	Con.	Com.	Tot.
Independence Party	D	8,187	23.36%	3	0	3
Progressive Party	B	5,759	16.43%	2	0	2
Left-Green Movement	V	5,493	15.67%	2	0	2
Social Democratic Alliance	S	4,996	14.25%	1	1	2
Bright Future	A	3,576	10.20%	1	0	1
Pirate Party	Þ	2,407	6.87%	0	1	1
Iceland Democratic Party	L	1,398	3.99%	0	0	0
Households Party	I	1,289	3.68%	0	0	0
Dawn	T	1,073	3.06%	0	0	0
Right-Green People's Party	G	556	1.59%	0	0	0
Rainbow	J	181	0.52%	0	0	0
Humanist Party	H	71	0.20%	0	0	0
People's Front of Iceland	R	64	0.18%	0	0	0
Valid votes		35,050	100.00%	9	2	11
Blank votes		767	2.13%			
Rejected votes – other		146	0.41%			
Total polled		35,963	79.00%			
Registered electors		45,523				

The following candidates were elected:

- Constituency seats - Árni Þór Sigurðsson (V), 4,054.3 votes; Birgir Ármannsson (D), 5,439.0 votes; Björt Ólafsdóttir (A), 3,456.7 votes; Brynjar Níelsson (D), 6,719.5 votes; Frosti Sigurjónsson (B), 5,752.0 votes; Illugi Gunnarsson (D), 7,943.0 votes; Katrín Jakobsdóttir (V), 5,488.0 votes; Össur Skarphéðinsson (S), 4,888.0 votes; and Sigrún Magnúsdóttir (B), 4,234.5 votes.
- Compensatory seats - Helgi Hrafn Gunnarsson (Þ), 2,383.0 votes; and Valgerður Bjarnadóttir (S), 3,693.8 votes.

==== 2000s ====
===== 2009 =====
Results of the 2009 parliamentary election held on 25 April 2009:

Party		Votes	%	Seats		
Party		Votes	%	Con.	Com.	Tot.
Social Democratic Alliance	S	11,568	32.94%	3	1	4
Left-Green Movement	V	8,432	24.01%	2	1	3
Independence Party	D	7,508	21.38%	2	0	2
Progressive Party	B	3,375	9.61%	1	0	1
Citizens' Movement	O	3,357	9.56%	1	0	1
Liberal Party	F	556	1.58%	0	0	0
Democracy Movement	P	325	0.93%	0	0	0
Valid votes		35,121	100.00%	9	2	11
Blank votes		1,145	3.14%			
Rejected votes – other		174	0.48%			
Total polled		36,440	83.26%			
Registered electors		43,767				

The following candidates were elected:

- Constituency seats - Árni Þór Sigurðsson (V), 6,827.0 votes; Helgi Hjörvar (S), 9,535.0 votes; Illugi Gunnarsson (D), 7,285.5 votes; Jóhanna Sigurðardóttir (S), 11,526.5 votes; Katrín Jakobsdóttir (V), 8,380.8 votes; Pétur Blöndal (D), 5,501.0 votes; Sigmundur Davíð Gunnlaugsson (B), 3,360.0 votes; Valgerður Bjarnadóttir (S), 8,645.5 votes; and Þráinn Bertelsson (O), 3,050.3 votes.
- Compensatory seats - Álfheiður Ingadóttir (V), 5,460.8 votes; and Steinunn Valdís Óskarsdóttir (S), 6,368.7 votes.

===== 2007 =====
Results of the 2007 parliamentary election held on 12 May 2007:

Party		Votes	%	Seats		
Party		Votes	%	Con.	Com.	Tot.
Independence Party	D	12,760	36.41%	4	0	4
Social Democratic Alliance	S	10,248	29.24%	3	2	5
Left-Green Movement	V	5,928	16.92%	2	0	2
Liberal Party	F	2,216	6.32%	0	0	0
Progressive Party	B	2,186	6.24%	0	0	0
Icelandic Movement – Living Country	I	1,706	4.87%	0	0	0
Valid votes		35,044	100.00%	9	2	11
Blank votes		510	1.43%			
Rejected votes – other		71	0.20%			
Total polled		35,625	81.42%			
Registered electors		43,756				

The following candidates were elected:

- Constituency seats - Árni Þór Sigurðsson (V), 4,405.5 votes; Guðfinna S. Bjarnadóttir (D), 11,121.7 votes; Guðlaugur Þór Þórðarson (D), 12,575.4 votes; Helgi Hjörvar (S), 8,150.6 votes; Jóhanna Sigurðardóttir (S), 9,205.6 votes; Katrín Jakobsdóttir (V), 5,911.5 votes; Össur Skarphéðinsson (S), 10,071.4 votes; Pétur Blöndal (D), 9,410.5 votes; and Sigurður Kári Kristjánsson (D), 7,940.9 votes.
- Compensatory seats - Ellert Schram (S), 6,162.6 votes; and Steinunn Valdís Óskarsdóttir (S), 7,119.1 votes.

===== 2003 =====
Results of the 2003 parliamentary election held on 10 May 2003:

Party		Votes	%	Seats		
Party		Votes	%	Con.	Com.	Tot.
Social Democratic Alliance	S	13,110	36.27%	4	0	4
Independence Party	D	12,833	35.50%	3	1	4
Progressive Party	B	4,199	11.62%	1	1	2
Left-Green Movement	U	3,537	9.79%	1	0	1
Liberal Party	F	2,002	5.54%	0	0	0
New Force	N	464	1.28%	0	0	0
Valid votes		36,145	100.00%	9	2	11
Blank votes		339	0.93%			
Rejected votes – other		131	0.36%			
Total polled		36,615	85.53%			
Registered electors		42,812				

The following candidates were elected:

- Constituency seats - Björn Bjarnason (D), 11,097.2 votes; Bryndís Hlöðversdóttir (S), 11,454.6 votes; Davíð Oddsson (D), 12,704.7 votes; Guðlaugur Þór Þórðarson (D), 9,519.5 votes; Guðrún Ögmundsdóttir (S), 9,820.2 votes; Halldór Ásgrímsson (B), 4,181.5 votes; Helgi Hjörvar (S), 7,998.5 votes; Kolbrún Halldórsdóttir (U), 3,328.0 votes; and Össur Skarphéðinsson (S), 12,653.2 votes.
- Compensatory seats - Árni Magnússon (B), 3,149.2 votes; and Sigurður Kári Kristjánsson (D), 7,982.1 votes.
