= Dagbjört Hákonardóttir =

Icelandic politician (born 1984)

Dagbjört Hákonardóttir (DagH)
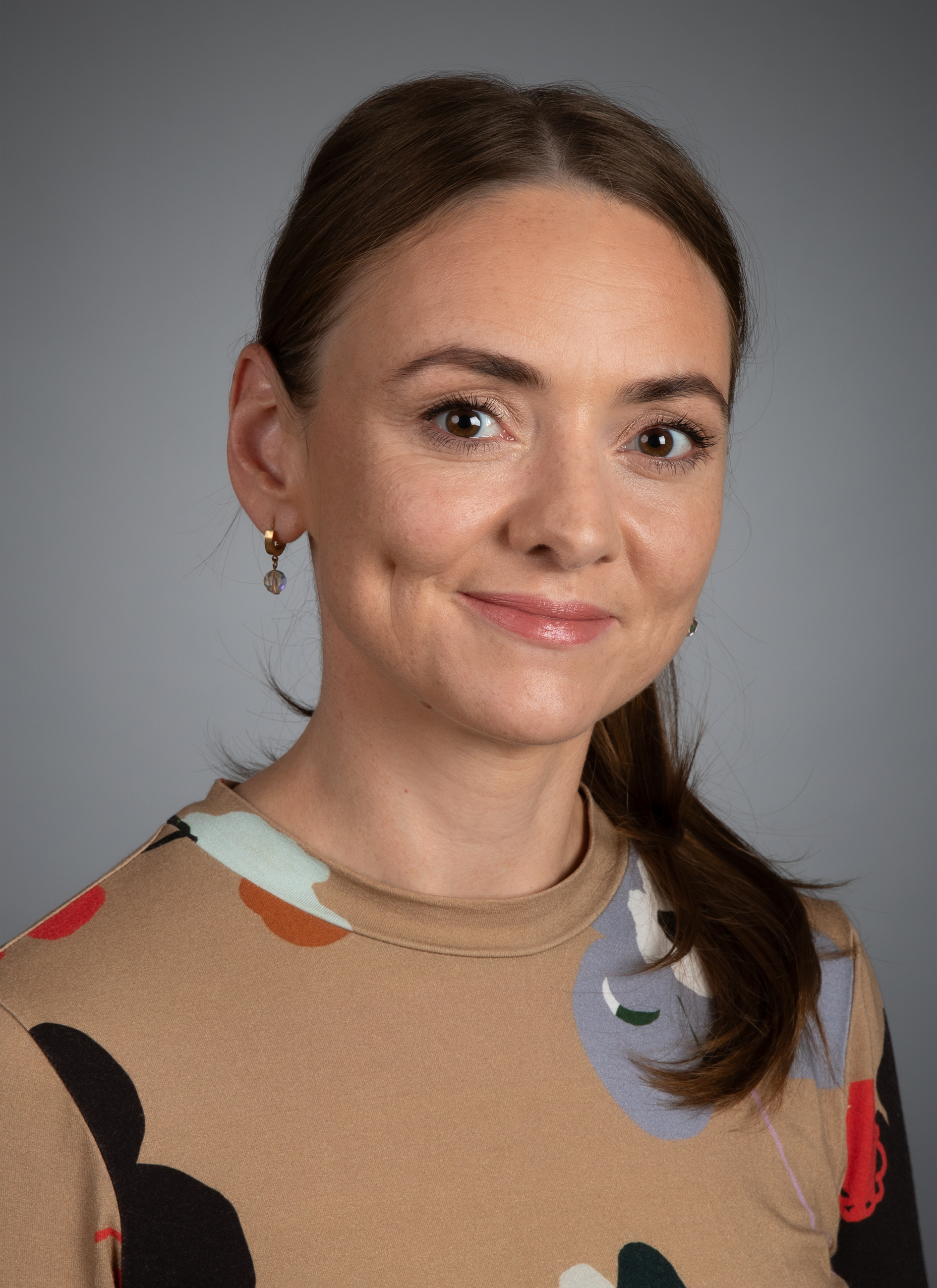
- Dagbjört in 2023

Member of the Althing
- Incumbent
- Assumed office 4 September 2023
- Preceded by: Helga Vala Helgadóttir
- Constituency: Reykjavík North

Personal details
- Born: 14 July 1984 (age 42) Reykjavík, Iceland
- Party: Social Democratic Alliance
- Education: University of Iceland

Dagbjört Hákonardóttir (born 14 July 1984) is an Icelandic lawyer, politician and member of the Althing. A member of the Social Democratic Alliance, she has represented Reykjavík North since September 2023.

== Early life ==
Dagbjört was born on 14 July 1984 in Reykjavík. She is the daughter of business economist Hákon Gunnarsson and nurse Katrín Björgvinsdóttir. She graduated from Hamrahlíð High School (MH) in 2004. She received a Bachelor of Arts degree in law from the University of Iceland (HÍ) in 2008. She received a Magister Juris degree from HÍ in 2010. She was a student council representative and a board member of Röskva from 2005 to 2007.

== Career ==
Dagbjört was a law student at the Ministry of Transport (2008–2010), an intern at the Ministry of Foreign Affairs (2010), a lawyer at the Debtor's Ombudsman (Umboðsmaður skuldara) (2010–2014) and a lawyer at the Citizens' Ombudsman (Umboðsmaður borgarbúa) (2015–2018). She was then a lawyer at the Office of the Mayor and City Clerk (2017–2018) and a Data Protection Officer for the City of Reykjavík (2018–2023).

In 2002 Dagbjört joined the Social Democratic Youth (Ungt jafnaðarfólk), the Social Democratic Alliance (Samfylkingin)'s youth wing. She was on Ungt jafnaðarfólk's executive board from 2003 to 2006. She was chair of the Young Europeans (2011–2013) and on the board of Nippon – the Icelandic-Japanese company (2013–2015). She served on the board of the Association of Liberal Social Democrats (FFJ) from 2014 to 2021 and was its chair from 2021 to 2023. She was a member of the board of directors of Vertonet, an association representing women in information technology, from 2022 to 2023.

Dagbjört contested the 2021 parliamentary election as a Samfylkingin candidate in Reykjavík North but was not elected. She was a substitute member of the Althing for Jóhann Páll Jóhannsson from February 2022 to March 2022 and from and January 2023 to February 2023, and for Helga Vala Helgadóttir from March 2022 to April 2022. She was appointed to the Althing in September 2023 following the resignation of Helga Vala Helgadóttir. She was re-elected at the 2024 parliamentary election.

== Personal life ==
Dagbjört is married to air traffic controller Þórhallur Gísli Samúelsson.

== Electoral history ==
Electoral history of Dagbjört Hákonardóttir
Election	Constituency	Party	Votes	Result
2021 parliamentary	Reykjavík North	Social Democratic Alliance	2,220.50	Not elected
2024 parliamentary	Reykjavík North	Social Democratic Alliance	7,181.25	Elected
