= 1979 Mosfellsheiði air crashes =

Two aircraft accidents in Iceland

Accident
- Date: 18 December 1979
- Summary: Air crashes
- Site: Mosfellsheiði, Iceland
- Total injuries: 11

First aircraft
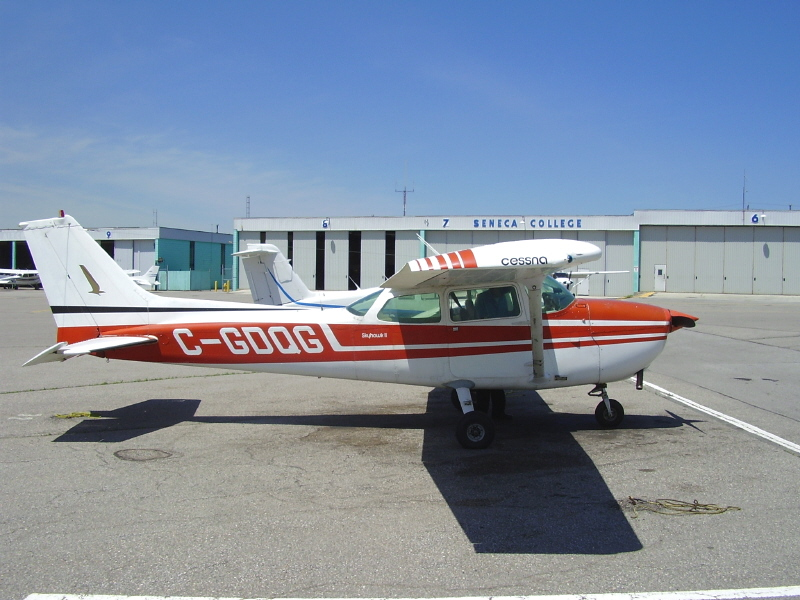
- A Cessna 172M, similar to the one that crashed.
- Type: Cessna 172
- Registration: TF-EKK
- Destination: Reykjavík Airport, Iceland
- Passengers: 3
- Crew: 1
- Injuries: 4

Second aircraft
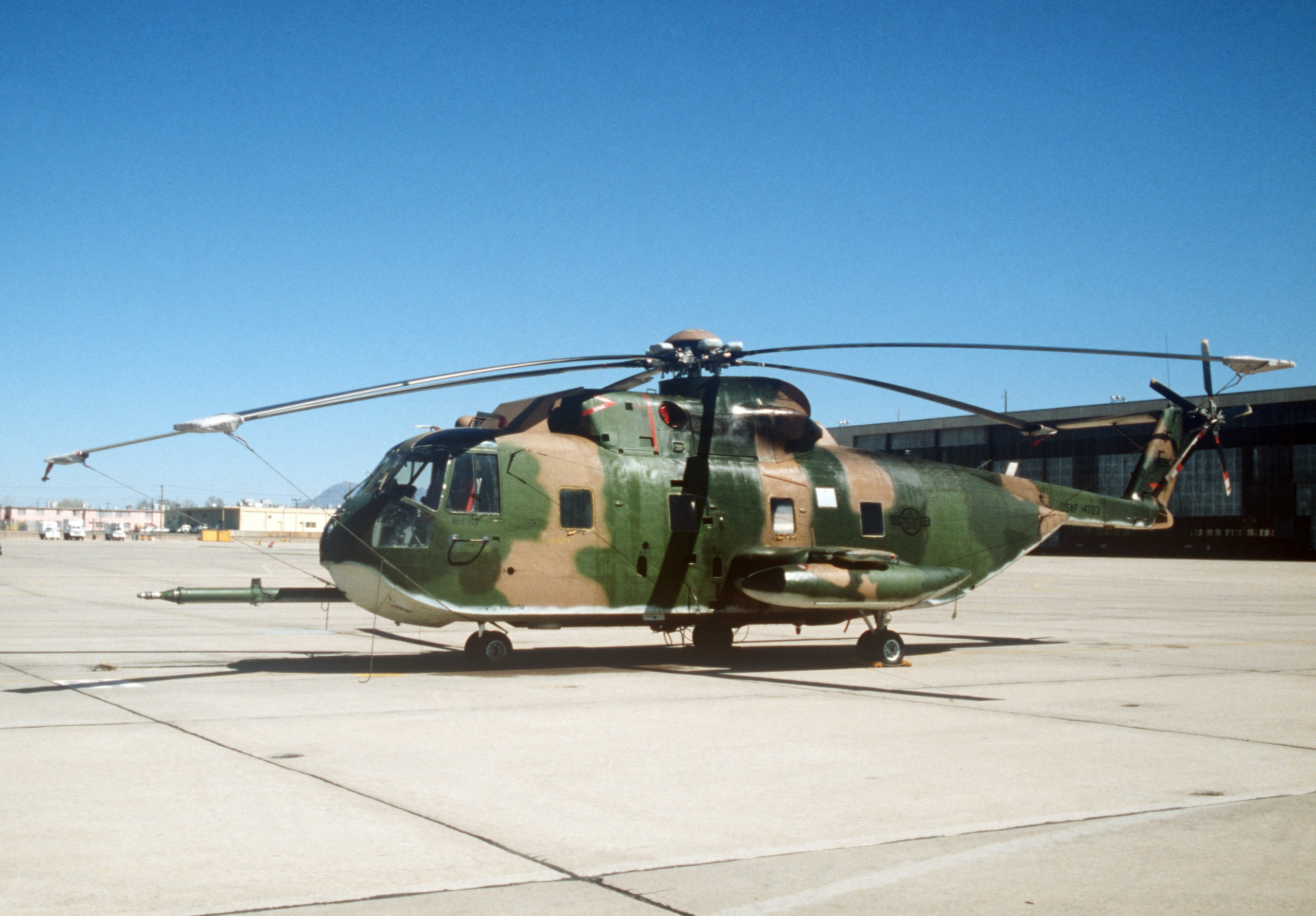
- Sikorsky HH-3E Jolly Green Giant, similar to the one that crashed.
- Type: Sikorsky HH-3E
- Operator: 67th Aerospace Rescue and Recovery Squadron (67th ARRS), United States Air Force (USAF)
- Flight origin: Naval Air Station Keflavik, Iceland
- Destination: Reykjavík, Iceland
- Passengers: 5
- Crew: 5
- Injuries: 10

The 1979 Mosfellsheiði air crashes were two aviation accidents in Iceland that occurred about four hours apart on 18 December 1979 on a heath between Reykjavík and Þingvellir. The first accident occurred when a Cessna F172M Skyhawk aircraft, with four on board, crashed into the heath. The second accident occurred when a Sikorsky HH-3E Jolly Green Giant rescue helicopter of the 67th Aerospace Rescue and Recovery Squadron, United States Air Force (USAF), from the Iceland Defense Force at Naval Air Station Keflavik, crashed with three of the injured from the previous accident, two Icelandic doctors and a five-man U.S. crew shortly after takeoff from the first crash site.

== The accidents ==
On 18 December 1979, a Cessna 172 aircraft, with registration number TF-EKK, took off from Reykjavík Airport with a French pilot, a New Zealander and two Finnish girls who worked as physiotherapists in Reykjalundur, on a sight-seeing tour around Gullfoss and Þingvellir. On its way back it crashed in heavy fog on the Mosfellsheiði heath. At around 15:20, the plane was reported missing and a signal from its emergency transmitter was detected. Shortly afterwards, a search plane discovered the wreckage on the heath, a short distance south of Þingvallarvegur, where it had broken up and turned upside down.

A helicopter from the Defense Force at Keflavík Airport that happened to be on a training mission nearby went to the scene and transported the New Zealander to Reykjavík, while leaving two crew members to attend to the other occupants, whose injuries were more severe, and wait for the Icelandic SAR teams, who arrived shortly later. After taking two doctors from Borgarspítalinn, fueling and offloading two of its crewmembers, the helicopter returned to the scene of the accident to pick up the Finns and the French pilot.

Shortly after the helicopter took off again from the scene of the accident, it lost power and crashed to the ground several hundred meters from the wreckage of the Cessna. Rescuers, including photographer Ragnar Axelsson, rushed to the second crash site and were confronted with the mangled remains of the helicopter and kerosene fumes filling the air. A 19-year-old SAR member, Hallgrímur Skúli Karlsson, who was one of the first at the scene, managed to prevent a fire in the wreckage by cutting the main power of the helicopter. After the second accident, the injured were transported about 1-1.5 km to ambulances that took them to Borgarspítali.

== Aftermath ==
In the aftermath of the accidents, the lack of equipment of the SAR units was criticised, especially its lack of two-way radios, which was largely a result of the Icelandic government's tariffs that doubled their prices.

== In media ==
The accidents were featured in the TV series Útkall in 2025.
