= Halldóra Mogensen =

Icelandic politician (born 1979)

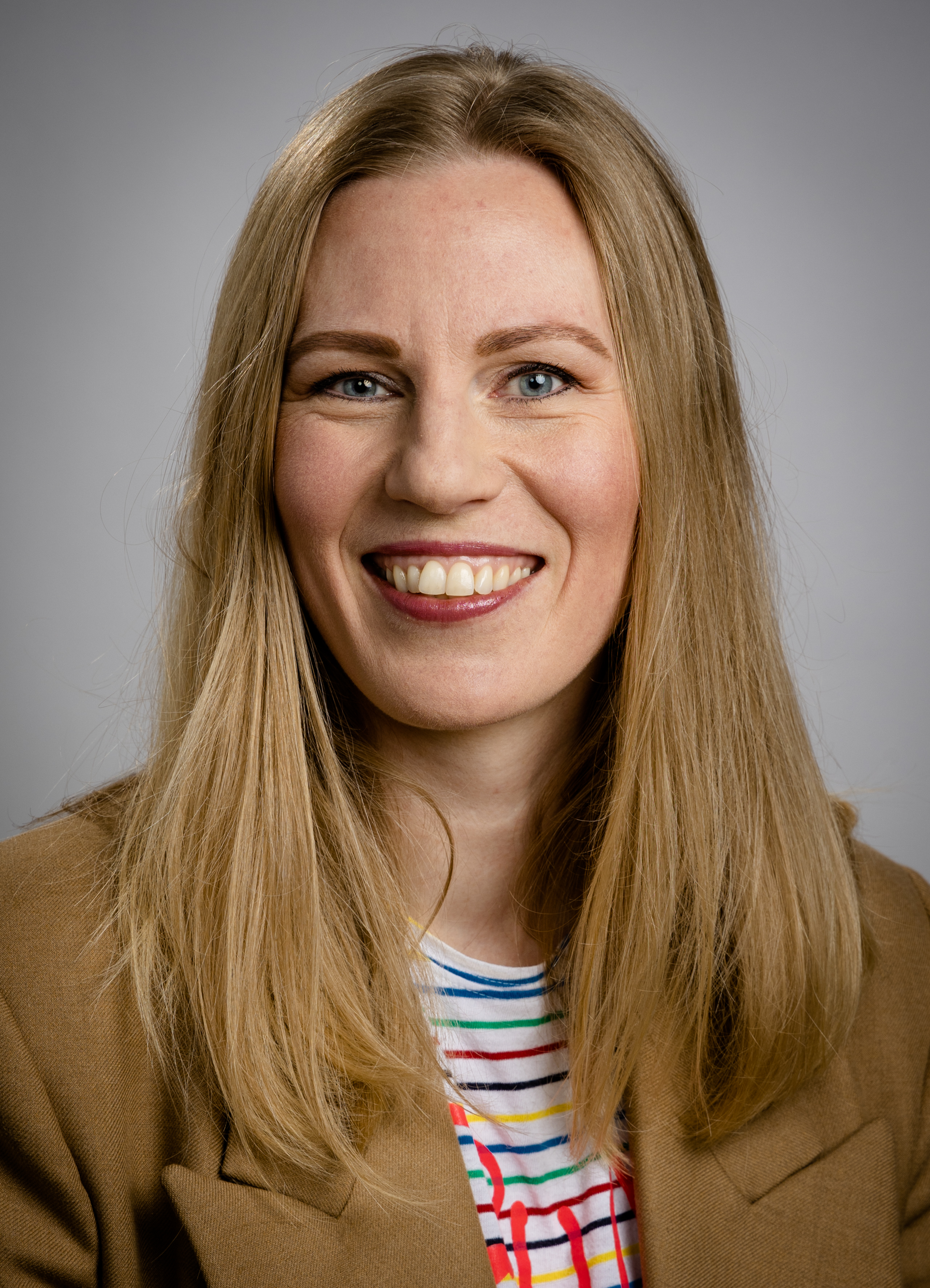
Halldóra Mogensen 2021

Halldóra Mogensen (born 11 July 1979) is an Icelandic politician from the Pirate Party who was elected to the Althing in 2016.
