= Halla Gunnarsdóttir =

Icelandic politician

- Born: 8 January 1981 (age 45)
- Occupations: Head of Policy and Partnerships of the Women's Equality Party, UK
- Title: Political Adviser to the Home Secretary of Iceland
- Political party: Women's Equality Party
- Movement: Feminist

Halla Gunnarsdóttir (8 January 1981) is an Iceland politician and feminist journalist and writer. A former political adviser to the home secretary of Iceland, she is head of policy and partnerships of the Women's Equality Party in the United Kingdom.

== Education ==
Gunnarsdóttir received a master's degree in international relations from the University of Iceland.

== Career ==
Gunnarsdóttir worked initially as a journalist from 2003 to 2009, and as an assistant to Ögmundur Jónasson in the Ministry of Health. Gunnarsdóttir was appointed Assistant Attorney to Justice and Human Rights in September 2010. During her term she researched the Icelandic criminal justice system and reviewed how sexual crimes are dealt with. Gunnarsdóttir has also written about security and national defence issues facing Iceland. She is a member of the Feminist Society of Iceland.

== Works ==
In 2013 Gunnarsdóttir authored an article for The Guardian, advocating the porn shield imposed by Iceland as a means to reduce sexual violence in the country.
