= Stundin =

Icelandic newspaper

- Type: Bi-monthly newspaper
- Format: Online newspaper, News magazine
- Owner: Útgáfufélagið Stundin ehf.
- Founded: 2015
- Ceased publication: January 2023
- Language: Icelandic
- Headquarters: Reykjavík, Iceland
- ISSN: 2298-7118
- Website: stundin.is (in Icelandic)

Stundin was an Icelandic bi-weekly newspaper known for investigative journalism. It took the form of both an online newspaper and a news magazine. It was founded in 2015 by former staff of DV after a hostile takeover of the paper. It was funded through the Karolina Fund platform and reached its goal of five million Icelandic krónas in two days. The chief editors of the paper where Ingibjörg Dögg Kjartansdóttir and Jón Trausti Reynisson. They each owned a 12 percent share in the company, and no single shareholder was allowed to own more than a 15 percent share. In January 2023, it merged with Kjarninn to form Heimildin.

== History ==
Stundin was founded in 2015 by journalists and others that were previously employed by DV (Dagblaðið Vísir), another Icelandic newspaper. They claimed the new management of DV had interrupted the work of its journalists. As of November 2016, the unique online readership of Stundin per week was about 94,100.

During the Panama Papers scandal, Stundin collaborated with Reykjavík Media to publish information from the Panama documents showing Landsbankinn, an Icelandic bank, acted as a customer for Mossack Fonseca.

In November 2019, Stundin collaborated with RÚV and Al Jazeera to report the involvement of Samherji, an Icelandic fishing company, in the Fishrot Files scandal. In 2020, journalists from the outlet received awards from the Union of Icelandic Journalists for their coverage of the Samherji Scandal in 2019.

In 2021, Stundin received 25.3 million Icelandic krónas (about $USD 199,055) as part of a series of subsidies issued by the Icelandic government to various media outlets.

In December 2022, the owners of the paper reached an agreement with Kjarninn to merge the two papers. The new paper was named Heimildin and first published on 13 January 2023.

== Glitnir coverage ==
On 16 October 2017, the Reykjavík District Commissioner placed an injunction on Stundin and Reykjavík Media, forbidding them from reporting about leaked documents pertaining to Glitnir, an Icelandic bank.

The finances of the Prime Minister of Iceland, Bjarni Benediktsson and those who were connected to him were the focus of Stundin's coverage of the Glitnir documents. The injunction was placed after Stundin and Reykjavík Media cooperated with The Guardian to publish information about Bjarni's financial activities. The injunction was not similarly applied to The Guardian.

The Icelandic government received criticism from advocates of press freedom due to the injunction. This included the Journalists' Union of Iceland and the OSCE. In February 2018, the injunction was removed by the Reykjavík District Court, and this was upheld by an appeals court. On 5 October 2018, the Landsréttur appeals court decided to lift the injunction. In March 2019, the Supreme Court of Iceland rejected every legal claim made by Glitnir, siding with Stundin and upheld the decision to lift the injunction.
