= Kjarninn =

Icelandic online newspaper

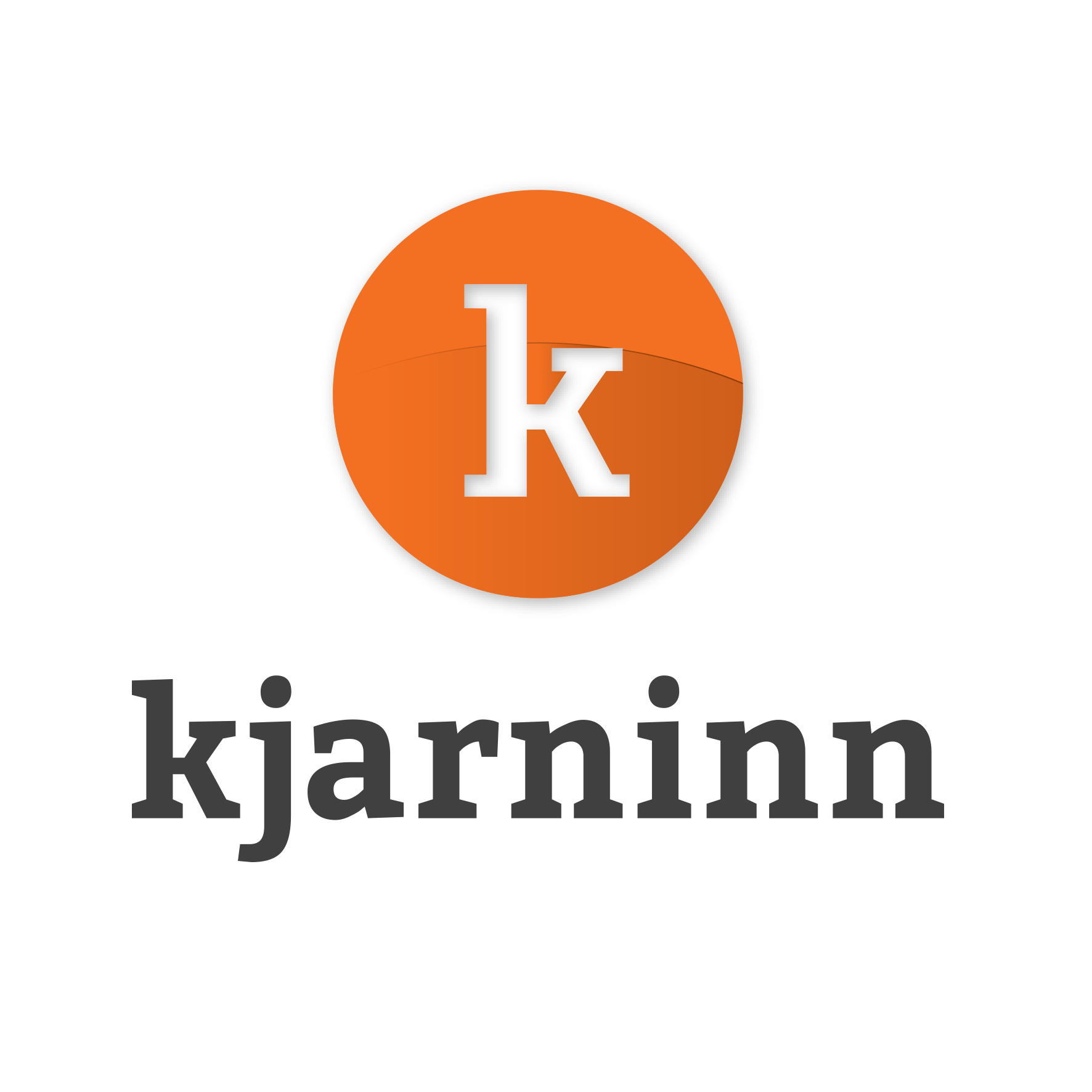
- Format: Online newspaper
- Founded: August 23, 2013; 12 years ago
- Ceased publication: January 13, 2023; 3 years ago
- Language: Icelandic
- Headquarters: Reykjavík, Iceland
- Website: www.kjarninn.is

Kjarninn (lit. 'the core') was an Icelandic online newspaper founded in August 2013. Previously Kjarninn was a weekly digital news magazine served via Apple App Store aimed at tablet computer users but PDFs were also available at the website. Since September 2014 Kjarninn' was an online-only newspaper.

The founders of Kjarninn originally worked at 365's free newspaper Fréttablaðið, which maintained a virtual monopoly on the market (69% in 2004). In February 2013, Magnús Halldórsson, later a journalist at Kjarninn, criticised businessman and former owner Jón Ásgeir Jóhannesson, whose wife Ingibjörg Pálmadóttir was the owner of 365, for trying to influence the editorial independence of Fréttablaðið in his favour. Shortly after this, Magnús and Þórður left 365 and founded Kjarninn.

From its first publication in August 2013, Kjarninn made headlines in Iceland for publishing leaked material connected to the 2008–11 Icelandic financial crisis. After the publication of the first issue the Financial Supervisory Authority demanded a report on Keflavik Savings Bank (by then defunct) that Kjarninn published be withdrawn. In October 2013 the Kaupthing winding up committee insisted Kjarninn withdraw the publication of a PriceWaterhouseCoopers report about how Kaupthing employees profited hugely by hedging against a strong Icelandic króna.

In December 2022, the owners of the paper reached an agreement with Stundin to merge the two papers. The new paper was named Heimildin and was first published on 13 January 2023.
