= Steinunn Þóra Árnadóttir =

Icelandic politician (born 1977)

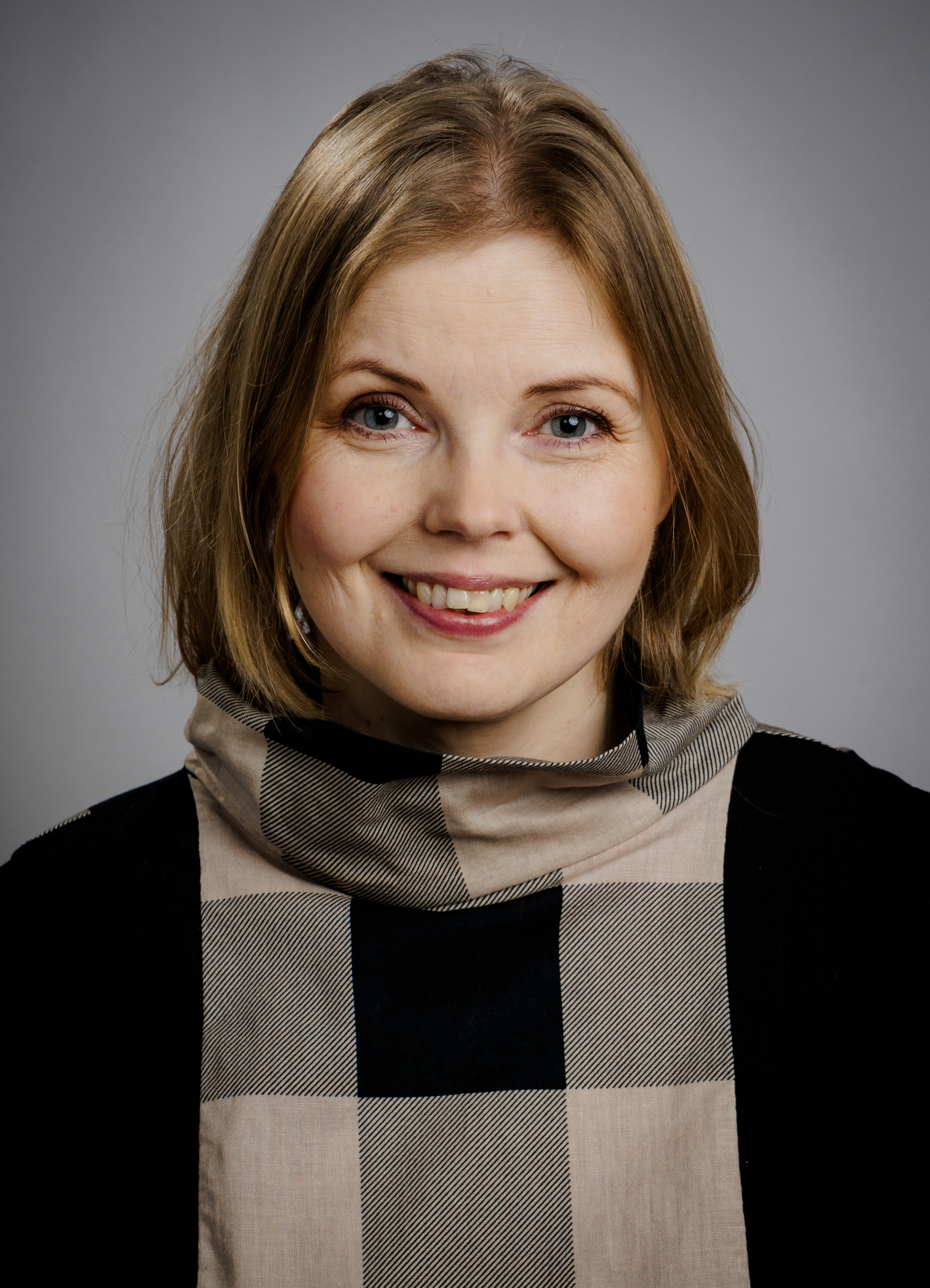
Steinunn Þóra Árnadóttir

Steinunn Þóra Árnadóttir (born 18 September 1977) is an Icelandic politician and former member of the Althing, from the Left-Green Movement.

== Political career ==
Steinunn Þóra has a BA in Anthropology and an MA in Disability Studies, both from the University of Iceland. She has been active within the MS-Society of Iceland as well as the Organization of Disabled in the country. Steinunn Þóra has been active within the Left-Green Movement for a number of years, including taking a place on the party's ticket in six parliament elections; 2007, 2009, 2013, 2016, 2017 and 2021. She did not run in the 2024 elections.

When Árni Þór Sigurðsson resigned from parliament on 18 August 2014, Steinunn Þóra took a permanent seat as his replacement, representing Reykjavík North Constituency.

== Personal life ==
She is married to the historian and politician Stefán Pálsson. The couple have two sons and are members of Ásatrúarfélagið.
