= Diljá Mist Einarsdóttir =

Icelandic politician (born 1987)

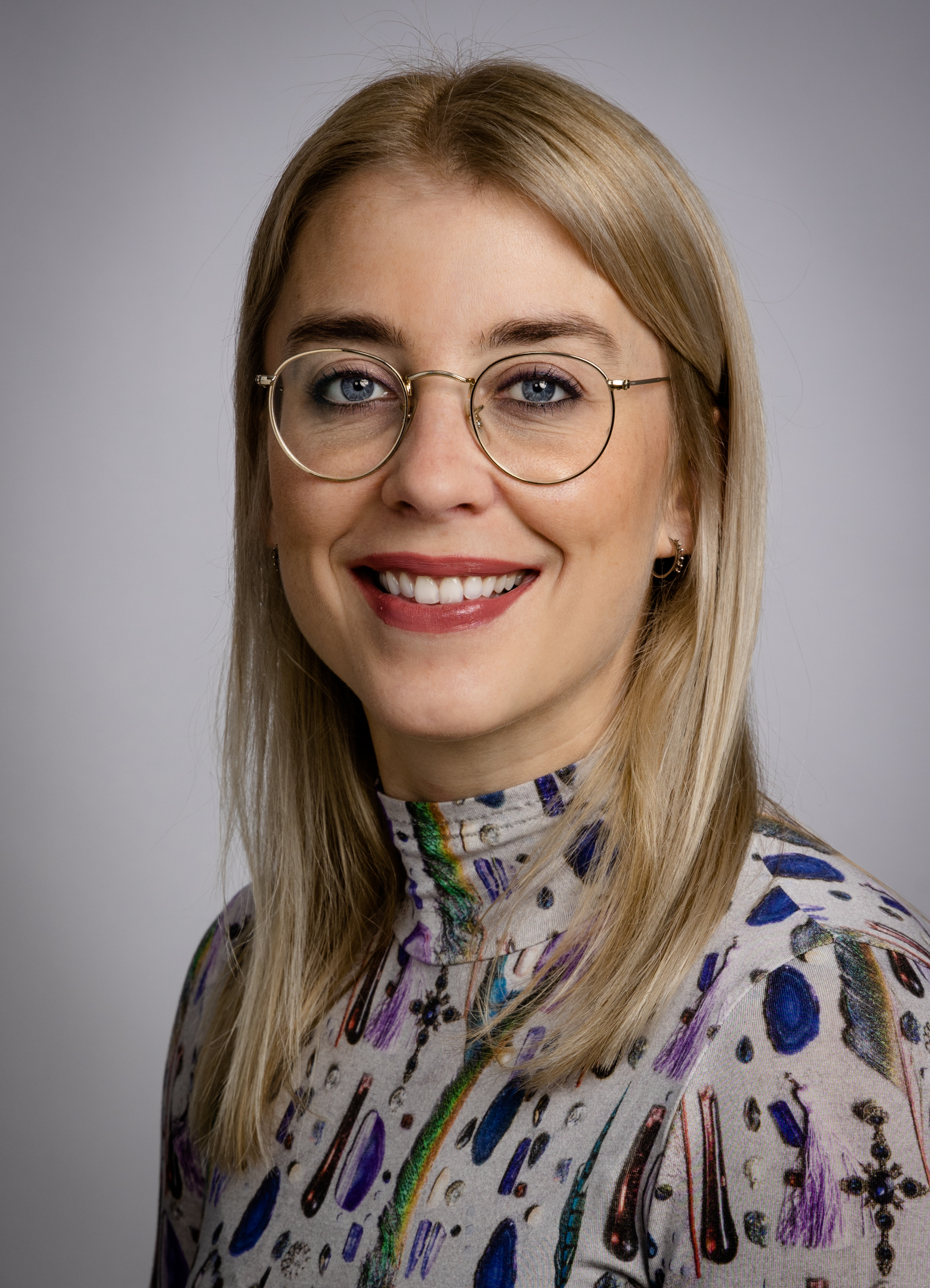
- Diljá Mist Einarsdóttir in 2021

Member of the Althing
- Incumbent
- Assumed office 2021
- Constituency: Reykjavík North

Personal details
- Born: December 21, 1987 (age 38) Reykjavík
- Party: Independence Party
- Spouse: Robert Benedikt Robertsson
- Children: 2
- Education: University of Iceland
- Occupation: Lawyer

Diljá Mist Einarsdóttir (born 21 December 1987) is an Icelandic politician and lawyer. She has been a member of the Althing for the Independence Party in the Reykjavík North constituency since 2021. She was previously an assistant to Guðlaugur Þór Þórðarson, the Minister of Foreign Affairs of Iceland. On 1 May 2021, Diljá Mist announced her candidacy in the Independence Party primary election in Reykjavík, where she sought third place on the party's list.

Diljá Mist graduated from the Icelandic School of Business in 2006, a BA in law from the University of Iceland in 2009, an MA in law in 2011, and an LL.M. in Natural Resources Law and International Environmental Law in 2017 from the same school. She was admitted to the District Court in 2012 and the Supreme Court in 2018, and worked as a representative at the law firm Lögmáli from 2011 to 2018, when she became Assistant to the Minister of Foreign Affairs and International Development Cooperation. Diljár's work within the ministry has focused on development cooperation, which has become an important part of Iceland's foreign policy, and she led a working group on the implementation of human rights-based development cooperation in bilateral cooperation, as well as working in a working group on the Foreign Service's support for export sectors.

Diljá has undertaken various projects within the Independence Party since the age of 17. She has served as secretary and vice-chair of Heimdall, second vice-chair of the Union of Young Independents, served on the board of the Independence Party's neighborhood association in Grafarvogur, served on the board of Vórður, the Independence Party's representative council, and was a member of the Reykjavík City Audit Committee. Diljá was on the Independence Party's list for the 2009 parliamentary elections and serves as the party's deputy city councilor in Reykjavík.

She was elected to the Parliament of Iceland in the 2021 Icelandic parliamentary election and was re-elected in 2024. She is chairwoman of the Economic and Trade Committee.
