= Helga Vala Helgadóttir =

Icelandic politician (born 1972)

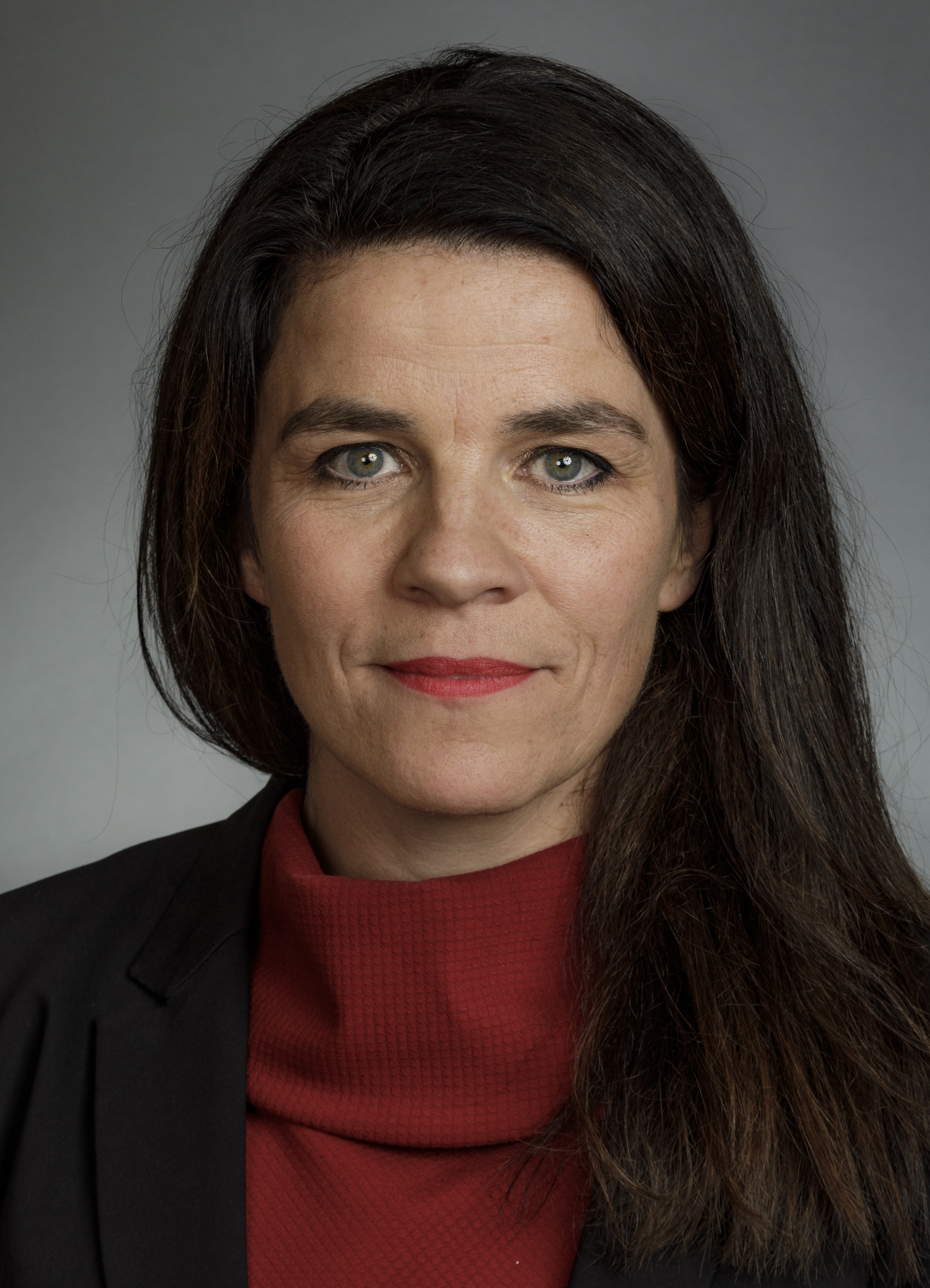

Member of the Althing
- In office 2017–2023

Personal details
- Born: 14 March 1972 (age 54) Reykjavík, Iceland
- Party: Social Democratic Alliance
- Spouse: Grímur Atlason
- Children: 4 including Ásta Júlía
- Parent(s): Helgi Skúlason; Helga Bachmann
- Relatives: Skúli Helgason (brother)

Helga Vala Helgadóttir (born 14 March 1972) is an Icelandic lawyer, former member of the Althing, and an actress. She was a member of the Althing, elected in the 2017 Icelandic parliamentary election for the Reykjavík North constituency, but resigned in September 2023 to become a lawyer again.

== Early life and education ==
Helga Vala was born on 14 March 1972 in Reykjavík. She was educated at Menntaskólinn við Hamrahlíð and then in 1998 trained in acting at the Icelandic Academy of the Performing Arts. She later gained a BA in 2009 and a master's degree in law from Reykjavík University in 2011. In 2011 she also received her lawyer's license and from 2011 to 2017, she operated her own law firm.

== Personal life ==
Helga Vala is married to Grímur Atlason, a former manager of the Iceland Airwaves music festival. They have four children together. Helga is the mother of basketball player Ásta Júlía Grímsdóttir.

== Political career ==
Helga Vala was chairman of the Social Democratic Alliance in Reykjavík from 2008 to 2010. She was member of the Althing for the Reykjavík North constituency from 2017-2023. In the campaign 2017, Helga Vala drew attention towards and emphasized equality, refugee and asylum issues, environmental issues and a new constitution for Iceland. She was the chairperson of Constitutional and Supervisory Committee and member of Environment and Communications Committee.

When she was member of parliament, Helga Vala attracted some attention in 2018 when she stepped out of Parliamentary Assembly at Þingvellir to protest the presence of Pia Kjærsgaard, president of the Danish parliament. Pia was a guest for the 100th anniversary of Iceland sovereignty.

She later said that her protest against Kjærsgaard was against her hate speech against foreigners and refugees but not against Kjærsgaard as a representative of the Danish.

Helga Vala attracted much attention for her criticism of Sigríður Á. Andersen how served as Minister of Justice. In 2017 Sigríður did not follow the recommendations of a special committee list of the most qualified judges for the newly formed Icelandic court of appeals and instead hand-picked 4 of them, including the wife of fellow Independence Party parliamentarian Brynjar Níelsson. On 12 March 2019 the European Court of Human Rights ruled that the appointments had been made illegally.

Helga Vala called for the Sigríður resignation On 13 March 2019, in the aftermath of the ruling, Sigríður announced that she would resign as minister of justice.

In September 2023, she decided to leave politics to become a lawyer again.

== Career ==
Helga Vala worked as an actress and director at Akureyri Theater in 1999 and also as an actress at New Perspective Theater Company in 2000. She was also a program director on the Bylgjan, RÚV, NFS from 2000 to 2006. Correspondent at publishing company Edda 2002. In 2008, she worked as a journalist on Mannlíf. She then came a legal representative at Lögron, Reykjavik Law Office and neighbor, 2009–2011. From 2011 to 2017, Helga ran her own law firm, Valva Lawyers. Helga Vala has held numerous confidential positions, including serving on the board of the Icelandic Actors Association, the National Theater Council and the Copyright Council.

In her work as a lawyer, Helga has specialized in the affairs of refugees, immigrants and families. Helga Vala has also as a lawyer worked with victims of sexual and domestic violence.

Helga Vala received recognition from Icelandic Ethical Humanist Association in 2014 for work in the field of human rights and humanitarianism in Iceland.
