= Borgarspítalinn =

Geography
- Location: Fossvogur, Reykjavík, Iceland
- Coordinates: 64.12281459945773°N 21.88782277272426°W

Organisation
- Type: General

Services
- Emergency department: Yes

Helipads
- Helipad: Yes

History
- Constructed: 1952
- Opened: 1967
- Closed: 1996 (merged with St. Jósefsspítali)

Links
- Lists: Hospitals in Iceland

Borgarspítalinn (English: City Hospital) was an Icelandic hospital located in Fossvogur, Reykjavík from 1967 until 1996 when it merged with St. Jósefsspítali to form Reykjavík Hospital. Reykjavík Hospital then merged with Landspítali in 2000 to form the National University Hospital of Iceland.

== History ==
The decision to build a city hospital was made by the Reykjavík City Council in 1948 when there was a great shortage of hospital beds in the city, but there were no plans to expand Landspítali. The preparatory committee decided to start building a hospital with 325 beds in Fossvogsdalur. The architects Einar Sveinsson and Gunnar Ólafsson were hired to design the hospital building and they went abroad to study similar structures abroad. Gunnar died in 1959, so Einar finished designing the house alone.

The foundation of the hospital was dug in 1952, and concrete work began two years later. Construction took a long time and no doubt played into the fact that at the same time an expansion of Landspítali was finally undertaken, which the Icelandic government fully supported at the same time as it paid for most of the construction of Borgarspítali.

While waiting for the new hospital, it was decided to furnish the two top floors of the Health Protection Center at Barónsstígur as a hospital. This activity was first called Bæjarspítalinn but Borgarspítalinn from the year 1962 when the name of Reykjavík was changed from Town of Reykjavík to Reykjavíkurborg.

The first patient was admitted to Borgarspítalinn in Fossvogur on 28 September 1967. As a result, various health institutions that had been run by the city moved there, such as the accident ward and laboratory that were previously in the Health Protection Center, the psychiatric ward that was previously in the Epidemic House and the hospital operation that Hvítabandið had run at Skólavörðustígur . In 1973, the hospital received a large building in the vicinity that was used for rehabilitation and was named Grensásdeild. Various other branches have been operated outside the main building over the years, such as maternity homes, long-term accommodation for the mentally ill and the geriatric ward.

A new three-storey emergency room was added in 1978.

In 1977, construction of a new wing to house elderly patients started. The construction was finished in 1983 and officially opened by Davíð Oddsson 22 June the same year.
