= Anarchism in Iceland =

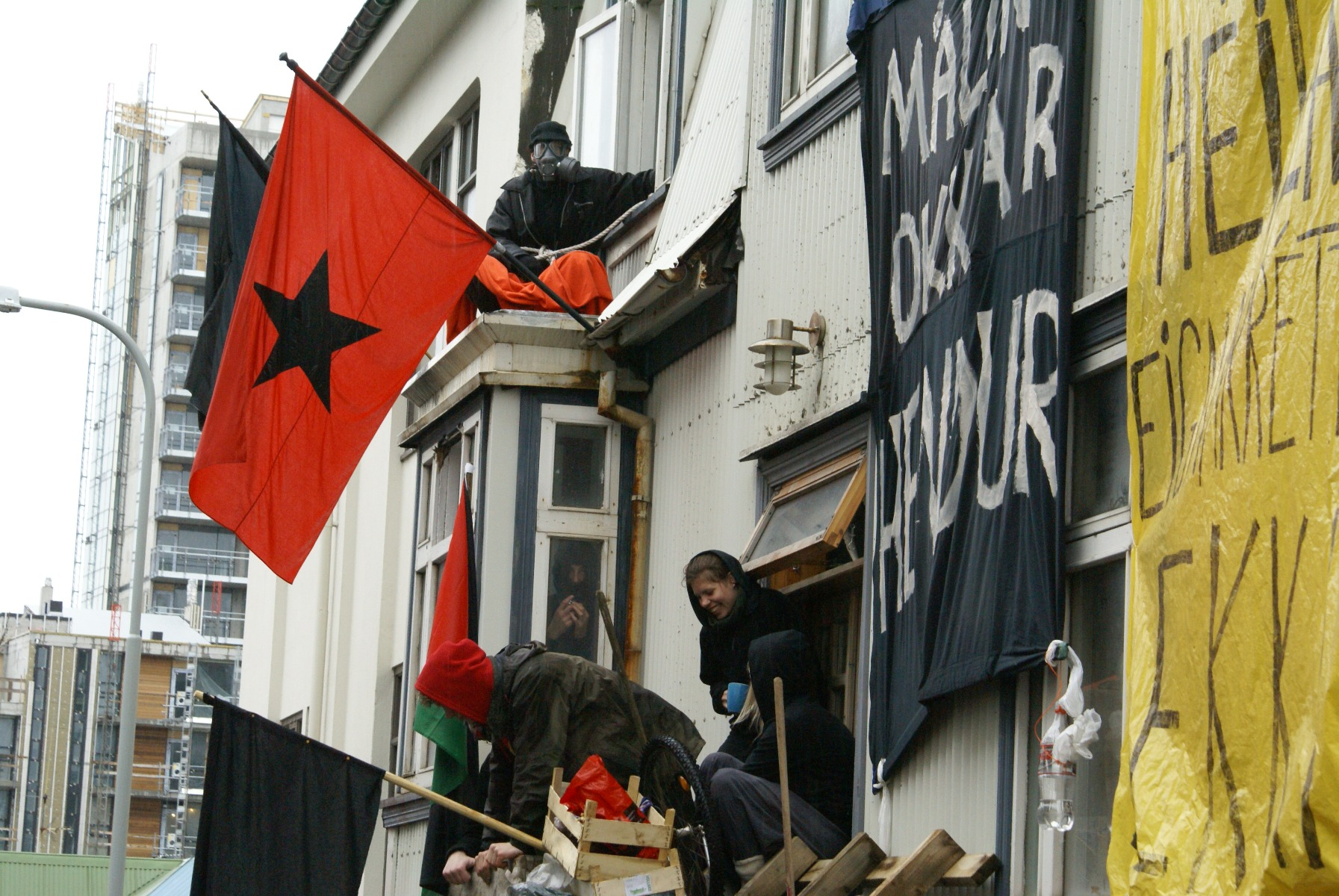
Anarchists occupying a house on Vatnsstígur, in Reykjavík

Anarchism in Iceland is a relatively small political movement which saw a surge in activity in the early 21st century. The medieval Icelandic Commonwealth established a stateless legal system in the country, before its colonisation by the Kingdom of Denmark. After independence, anarchism slowly gained a small following in activist circles and in the punk subculture of the 1980s. During the early 2000s, anarchists became involved in publishing and distributing anarchist texts in the Icelandic language, and some joined the environmentalist organisation Saving Iceland, which led to a resurgence in activism in the country. Anarchists achieved their greatest prominence during the 2009 Icelandic financial crisis protests, in which they formed the vanguard of the movement, sharing their experience with newer activists and taking initiative in direct actions. Anarchists then participated in the constitutional reform process of the early 2010s, which they encouraged for the use of direct democracy. During this period, a number of anarchist activists were elected to public office, with Jón Gnarr becoming Mayor of Reykjavík and Birgitta Jónsdóttir becoming a member of parliament.

== Early history ==
Followers of the American libertarian economist Murray Rothbard have cited the medieval Icelandic Commonwealth as an early example of a stateless legal system with a private security apparatus. Iceland later became a colony of the Kingdom of Denmark, which taxed the country heavily, imposed a trade monopoly on it and left it underdeveloped, with most of the population relying on subsistence agriculture until the country's independence in 1944. An Icelandic anarchist movement did not emerge until this contemporary period. The first anarchist text published in the Icelandic language was a translation of Peter Kropotkin's Memoirs of a Revolutionist, published by the Reykjavík-based publishing house Ísafoldarprentsmiðja H.F. in 1942. Anarchist sympathies in Iceland began to spread in the wake of the Protests of 1968, with the contemporary anarchist movement emerging out of the punk subculture of the 1980s.

By the 21st century, the issues of environmentalism, anti-capitalism and feminism were growing in the Icelandic popular consciousness. In the early 2000s, the Andspyrna group began publishing a series of Icelandic translations of anarchist texts, including works by Nicolas Walter, CrimethInc. and Errico Malatesta. In 2007, it published its own primer on direct action and civil disobedience, Beinar Aðgerðir og Borgaraleg Óhlýðni. The group ran its own library, published and distributed anarchist literature in the Icelandic language and maintained a web portal for Icelandic activists. Other Icelandic anarchists also published their own periodicals, including the monthly Róstur and the annual Svartur Svanur. Other anarchist groups included: the Icelandic section of the No Border network, which provided support to asylum seekers and refugees; and the Reykjavík chapter of Food Not Bombs. In the Icelandic capital, many anarchist activists met at the Kaffi Hljómalind, a cooperative café which also functioned as a community centre. But the anarchist movement lacked a political organisation and it was largely marginalised from wider society, with the movement numbering no more than a few dozen people.

In the mid-2000s, the environmentalist group Saving Iceland, which had notable green anarchist tendencies, carried out a number of direct actions against the construction of a hydroelectric plant in the east of the country. Anarchist activists in Saving Iceland reported that its activities led to a resurgence in the country's social movements, which had been largely dormant over the previous decades.

== 2008–2011 financial crisis ==
=== Protests ===
The introduction of neoliberalism to Iceland in the late 20th century resulted in a pronounced boom and bust cycle, with the country seeing rapid economic growth until the 2008 financial crash, when the external debt owed by Icelandic banks rose dramatically. The collapse of the country's three major banks resulted in the Icelandic króna losing its value, causing a large rise in inflation. Widespread disillusionment in the government and financial sector led to a mobilisation of protest activity, largely drawing its support from the left-wing and anti-corruption movements. In September 2008, anarchist activists began holding meetings in cafes and private homes, where they discussed how to coordinate action in response to the financial crisis.

By the time protests began to mobilise, there were roughly 70 anarchists in Reykjavík; despite their small size, they were able to gain a significant influence over the protest movement. The so-called Pots and Pans Revolution began in October 2008, with a series of peaceful political demonstrations outside the Althing calling for the resignation of the government. The lack of a government response to the crisis culminated with the closing of the parliament for Christmas break, which exacerbated public anti-establishment sentiment. On 21 December 2008, anarchist activists stormed the National Theatre of Iceland, where they aimed to convince the Social Democratic Alliance (SDA) to break away from the government led by the right-wing Independence Party (IP).

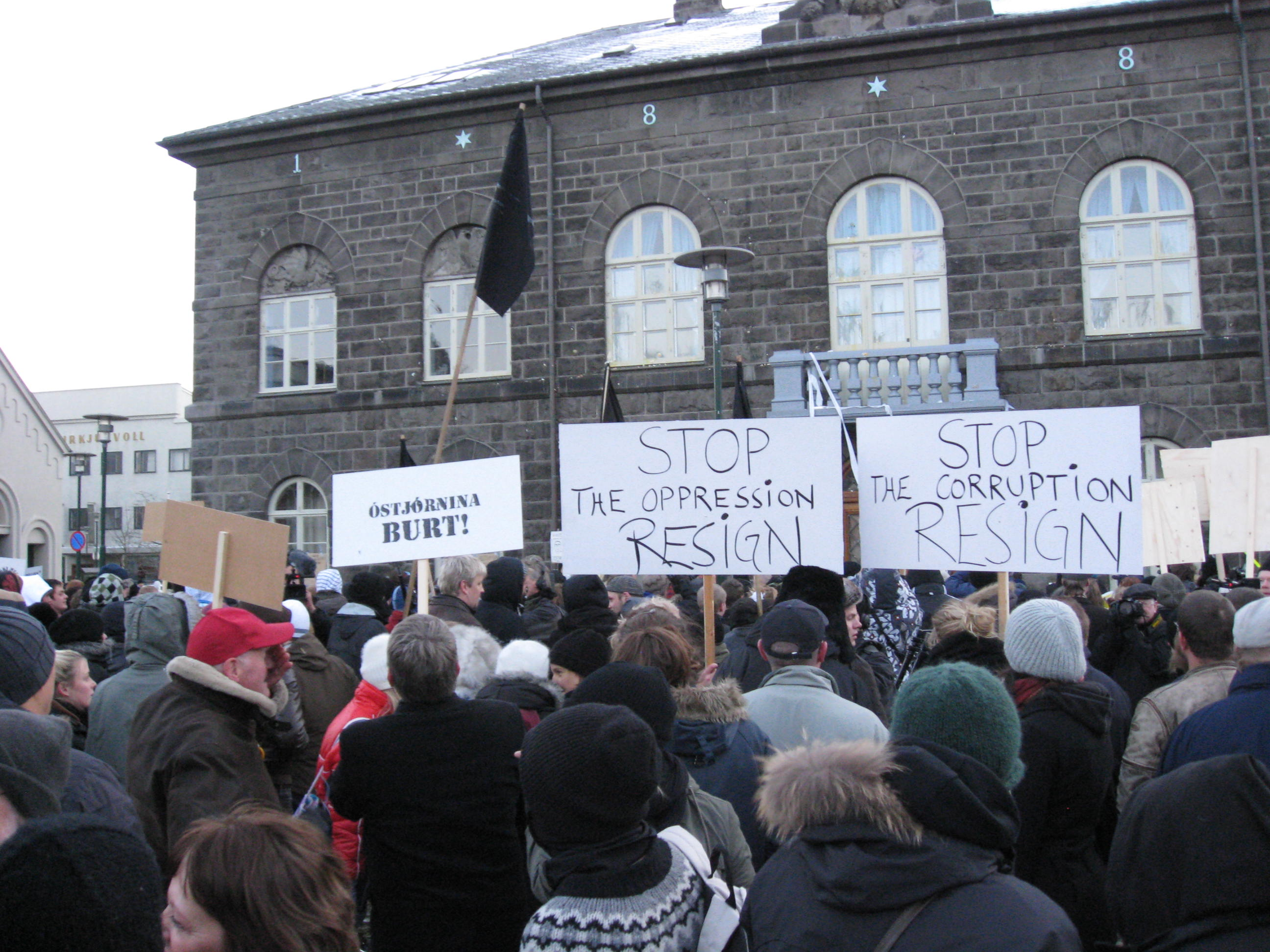
Icelandic protestors demanding the resignation of the government

When Parliament resumed on 20 January 2009, tens of thousands of people held a demonstration outside the building, where people openly talked of revolution. Most participants in the protests had no connection to existing social movements, and many had previously been disinterested in politics. Iceland's small anarchist movement was in the vanguard of the protest movement, providing it with their expertise as seasoned activists and taking the initiative in direct actions, but the movement was largely decentralised and organised horizontally. The protest movements demands, which were largely focused on the resignation of the government and financial officials, was infused with an undertone of anti-statism by the anarchist participants.

At the protests, young anarchists also formed links with an older generation of activists who were active in the anti-NATO movement of the 1950s and 1960s, which strengthened both movements across generational lines. When some protestors threw food at police, they responded by attacking the protestors. For the first time since the 1949 anti-NATO riot in Iceland, Icelandic police used tear gas against civilian activists. By the end of January, the protests had succeeded in toppling the government; a new centre-left coalition was elected in its place. The anarchist collective Aftaka reported that the government had been brought down after "simply ordinary people" had taken to civil disobedience, direct action and sabotage.

=== Changes in government ===
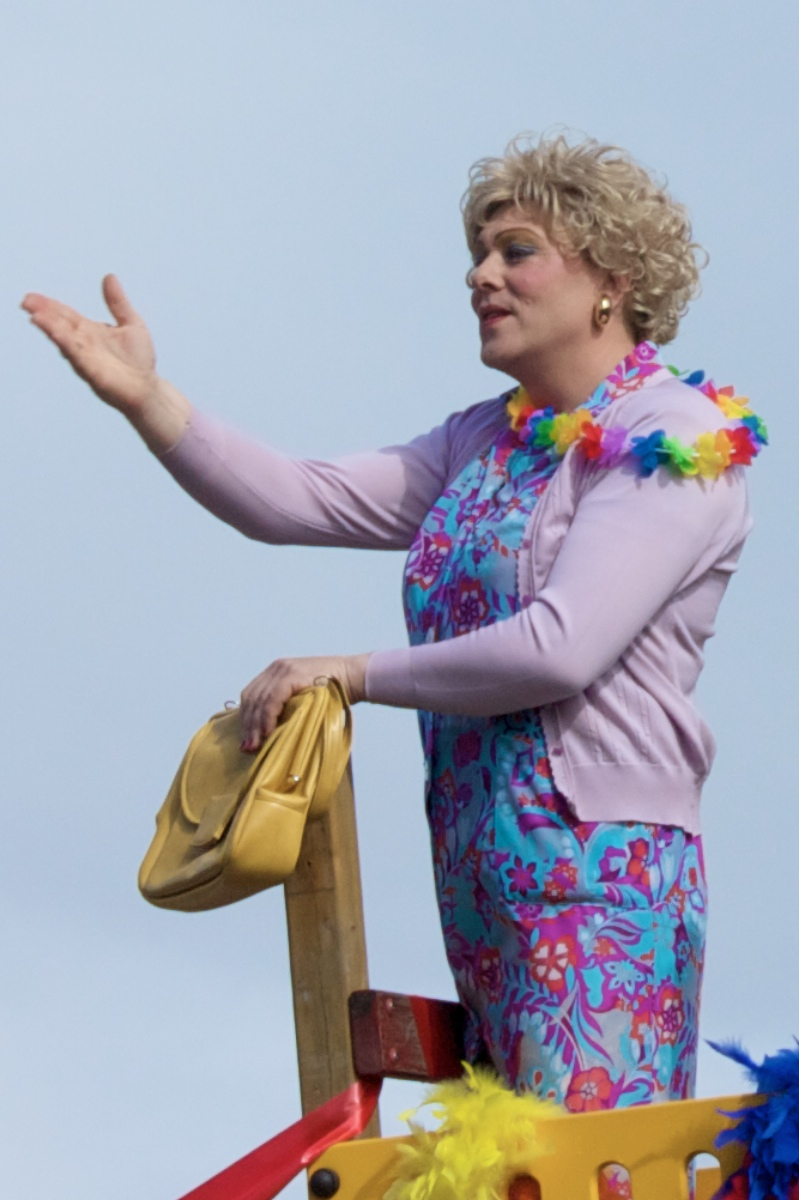
Reykjavík mayor Jón Gnarr, dressed in drag, at the city's pride parade (2010)

During the subsequent 2010 Icelandic municipal elections, the anarcho-surrealist Best Party, which ran on a platform of debt abolition, won 34.72% of the vote in Reykjavík; party leader Jón Gnarr, himself inspired by Mikhail Bakunin and Peter Kropotkin, became the city's mayor. After observing the popular opposition to neoliberalism in Iceland, the American anarchist David Graeber told Gnarr that he believed Iceland was likely to become a "genuinely free society" within his lifetime. Gnarr himself believed that Iceland had the potential to become an "anarcho-socialist country" and encouraged people to move to the country to help make that a reality. When the International Monetary Fund (IMF) offered a loan to bail out the banks, it was overwhelmingly rejected in the 2010 Icelandic loan guarantees referendum.

Meanwhile, the centre-left government promised to carry out a constitutional reform process, which was complemented by a grassroots movement for systematic change. Popular assemblies were held in conjunction with the newly established National Assembly, during which activists coordinated working groups to oversee the direction of reform. Anarchist activists were initially enthusiastic about the process, as it gave rise to more direct democracy and greater public participation in decision-makingy. The following year, a Constitutional Assembly was elected and the new draft constitution was approved in a referendum, but the centre-left government failed to implement the new constitution.

By this time, the government had lost the confidence of the protest movement due to its implementation of austerity measures. Parliamentary disagreements over the constitution culminated in the 2013 Icelandic parliamentary election, when a new right-wing coalition government was brought to power and blocked the passage of the constitution, while the left-wing fragmented and declined. The only anti-austerity activists who gained seats in the election were those of the Pirate Party, founded by the anarchist WikiLeaks activist Birgitta Jónsdóttir.

=== Aftermath ===
Since the protest movement, anarchist activists have noted a wider interest in political discussion and participation. According to one activist, the resignation of the pre-2008 government made many people feel empowered and led to people seeing themselves as playing an active role in the shaping of society. The entry of the Pirate Party and the Best Party into politics also made more space for radical views, particularly on political transparency. The failure of the centre-left government to pass the constitution also reinforced anarchist critiques of the state system, with some coming to feel that the rise of the subsequent right-wing government had resulted in the preservation of political corruption in the country. In 2014, Jon Gnarr resigned as mayor of Reykjavík and abandoned politics. Despite its shortcomings, anarchist activists largely look back on the protest movement positively, as it led to a resurgence in activism against austerity and in support of other causes, including the Free Gaza Movement.

== Later activities ==
In 2017, Icelandic anarchist Haukur Hilmarsson travelled to Northern Syria and volunteered to join the Revolutionary Union for Internationalist Solidarity (RUIS), a Greek anarchist detachment fighting in the Syrian Civil War. He was killed by the Turkish Armed Forces in early 2018, while fighting against the Turkish invasion of Afrin. He has since been held up as a martyr by anti-fascists.

Around this time, former Reykjavík mayor Jón Gnarr returned to politics and joined the Social Democratic Alliance, but found that his anarchist belief in individual freedom distinguished him from other social democrats. He subsequently joined the Liberal Reform Party and ran on its list in the 2024 Icelandic parliamentary election.

== See also ==
- Category:Icelandic anarchists
- List of anarchist movements by region
- Anarchism in Norway

== Bibliography ==
- Hammond, John L. (2015). "The Anarchism of Occupy Wall Street". Science & Society. 79 (2): 288–313. doi:10.1521/siso.2015.79.2.288.
- Jóhannesson, Eggert (28 September 2024). "Jón Gnarr joining the Liberal Reform Party: "I'm a great anarchist and a libertarian"". Iceland Monitor. ISSN 1021-7266.
- Kompatsiaris, Panos (2019). "On the Heroisms of Today: Experience, Memory and Risk as Anti-fascist Politics in Contemporary Art". Third Text. 33 (3): 1–16. doi:10.1080/09528822.2019.1628447. ISSN 1475-5297.
- Kuhn, Gabriel (2012). "The Nordic Countries: Denmark, Finland, Iceland, Norway, Sweden". In Kinna, Ruth (ed.). The Continuum Companion to Anarchism (2012). Bloomsbury Publishing USA. pp. 420–428. ISBN 978-1-4411-4270-2.
- Long, Roderick T. (2017). "Anarchism and Libertarianism". In Jun, Nathan (ed.). Brill's Companion to Anarchism and Philosophy. Leiden: Brill. pp. 285–317. doi:10.1163/9789004356894_012. ISBN 978-90-04-35689-4.
- Öz, Volkan (2023). "Fighting Fire with Fire? An Assesment of the Potential Threats of Westerners Fighting against ISIS in Syria and Iraq". Savunma Bilimleri Dergisi. 1 (43): 51–74. doi:10.17134/khosbd.1085135.
- Ruthven, Heathcote (2013). "Anarchism in Iceland: Is True Friendship Possible Under Capitalism?". Ethnographic Encounters. 3 (2): 26–32. ISSN 2516-287X.
- Vogiatzoglou, Markos (2017). "Iceland's Mobilization in the Financial Crisis". In della Porta, Donatella; Andretta, Massimiliano; Fernandes, Tiago; Romanos, Eduardo; O'Connor, Francis; Vogiatzoglou, Markos (eds.). Late Neoliberalism and Its Discontents in the Economic Crisis. Comparing Social Movements in the European Periphery. Palgrave Macmillan. pp. 39–64. doi:10.1007/978-3-319-35080-6_2. ISBN 978-3-319-35079-0.
