= Gylfason =

Gylfason is a surname of Icelandic origin, meaning son of Gylfi. In Icelandic names, the name is not strictly a surname, but a patronymic. The name refers to:

- Ágúst Gylfason (born 1971), Icelandic footballer
- Vilmundur Gylfason (1948–1983), Icelandic politician, historian, and poet
- Þorsteinn Gylfason (1942–2005), Icelandic philosopher, poet, and translator
- Þorvaldur Gylfason, Icelandic economist and professor of economics
