= 2010–2013 Icelandic constitutional reform =

An Icelandic Constitutional Council (Stjórnlagaráð) for the purpose of reviewing the Constitution of the Republic was appointed by a resolution of Althingi, the Icelandic parliament, on 24 March 2011. Elections were held to create a Constitutional Assembly (Stjórnlagaþing) body, but given some electoral flaws, had been ruled null and void by the Supreme Court of Iceland on 25 January 2011, leading the parliament to place most of the winning candidates into a Constitutional Council with similar mission. The question of whether the text of the proposed constitution should form a base for a future constitution was put to a non-binding referendum, where it won the approval of 67% of voters. However, the government's term finished before the reform bill could be passed, and following governments have not acted upon it.

== Background ==
The present Constitution of Iceland was adopted in 1944. Critics of the constitution allege that it 'was drawn up in haste with minimal adjustment of the 1874 constitution as part of Iceland's declaration of independence from Nazi-occupied Denmark'. Furthermore, critics alleged that 2008–11 Icelandic financial crisis exposed the weaknesses of this document, originally intended to be provisional. Following the Kitchenware Revolution, the 2009 Icelandic parliamentary election brought to power a coalition government of the Social Democratic Alliance and the Left-Green Movement. This government undertook to create a new constitution, for the first time in Iceland's history reviewing broad areas of the constitution.

== The 2009 and 2010 National Assemblies ==
In 2009, private individuals and civil society groups organised a National Assembly of 1500 people—1200 chosen at random from the national registry and 300 chosen as representatives of companies, institutions and other groups—to discuss the core values on which Icelandic governance should proceed.

The 2009 National Assembly was followed in November 2010 by a government-organised assembly of 950 randomly selected citizens. The citizens chosen randomly were representative of Iceland's gender, geographic, and age makeup. A Constitutional Committee appointed by the Parliament compiled a two-volume report on the opinions generated by the 2010 National Assembly and presented the main conclusions at a press conference following the assembly. It was stated that 97% of the participants thought the format of the meeting was good, 95% thought the meeting went well and 75% considered the execution of the meeting to be exemplary. About 93% of the participants believed that the results of the meeting would benefit the Constituent Assembly in its work on a new constitution. In addition, They reported that the values that the participants considered the most important to base the constitution on were: Equality, human rights, democracy, honesty, justice, respect, freedom and responsibility. The assembly also concluded that the new constitution 'ought to contain certain key provisions concerning, e.g., electoral reform and the ownership of natural resources, for a long time two of the most contentious political issues in Iceland'.

== Appointing the Constitutional Assembly ==
=== Act on a Constitutional Assembly ===
The government passed the Act on a Constitutional Assembly no. 90/2010, legislating a special Constitutional Assembly to revise the Icelandic Constitution of the Republic. The Assembly was to comprise 25 delegates elected by direct personal election. The Assembly had to convene by 15 February 2011 and finish its work no later than 15 April 2011. The revised constitution was to be voted on by the Althingi and then put to a referendum.

The remit was:

# The foundations of the Icelandic constitution and its fundamental concepts;

1. The organisation of the legislative and executive branches and the limits of their powers;
2. The role and position of the President of the Republic;
3. The independence of the judiciary and their supervision of other holders of governmental powers;
4. Provisions on elections and electoral districts;
5. Public participation in the democratic process, including the timing and organisation of a referendum, including a referendum on a legislative bill for a constitutional act;
6. Transfer of sovereign powers to international organisations and the conduct of foreign affairs;
7. Environmental matters, including the ownership and utilisation of natural resources.

The Constitutional Assembly was also empowered to address additional matters beyond "reviewing the Constitution of the Republic".

=== Election ===
An election was held for the assembly on 27 November 2010 using STV-PR under the Weighted Inclusive Gregory Method. 522 people stood in the election, more than double the most optimistic estimates.

The voter turnout was 36%. 15 men and 10 women were elected, fulfilling the quota of 40% women required. The elected candidates were:

Candidate	Profession	First preference votes	Total votes
Þorvaldur Gylfason	University Professor of Economics	7,192	28,807
Salvör Nordal	Director of the University of Iceland Ethics Institute	2,842	19,727
Ómar Þorfinnur Ragnarsson	Media Presenter	2,440	24,411
Andrés Magnússon	Physician	2,175	13,518
Pétur Gunnlaugsson	Lawyer and Radio Presenter	1,989	5,727
Þorkell Helgason	Mathematician	1,930	12,729
Ari Teitsson	Farmer	1,686	10,713
Illugi Jökulsson	Journalist	1,593	23,707
Freyja Haraldsdóttir	Manager	1,089	15,404
Silja Bára Ómarsdóttir	Lecturer in International Politics	1,054	13,613
Örn Bárður Jónsson	Pastor	806	11,180
Eiríkur Bergmann Einarsson	Reader of Political Science	753	13,106
Dögg Harðardóttir	Manager of the Division of Architecture at Reykjavik Art Museum	674	5,038
Vilhjálmur Þorsteinsson	Chairman of CCP Games	672	8,251
Þórhildur Þorleifsdóttir	Theatre Director	584	11,156
Pawel Bartoszek	Mathematician	584	6,532
Arnfríður Guðmundsdóttir	University Professor	531	7,276
Erlingur Sigurdarson	Former Museum Director and Teacher	526	10,245
Inga Lind Karlsdóttir	Media Presenter and University Student	493	7,774
Katrín Oddsdóttir	Lawyer	479	8,984
Guðmundur Gunnarsson	Trade Union Chairman	432	10,922
Katrín Fjelsted	Physician	418	11,154
Ástrós Gunnlaugsdóttir	Political Scientist and University Student	396	7,153
Gísli Tryggvason	Consumer Spokesperson	348	9,659
Lýður Árnason	Filmmaker and Physician	347	7,853

=== Election declared null and void by the Supreme Court ===
The Supreme Court of Iceland ruled the election to the Constitutional Assembly null and void with a decision on 25 January 2011. Six Supreme Court Justices examined complaints about the election process. The Justices were: Garðar Gíslason, Árni Kolbeinsson, Gunnlaugur Claessen, Jón Steinar Gunnlaugsson, Páll Hreinsson and Viðar Már Matthíasson.

The Supreme Court of Iceland received complaints from Óðinn Sigþórsson, Skafti Harðarson and Þorgrímur S. Þorgrímsson. The complaints regarded various faults of the election process, according to the complainants. The Supreme Court of Iceland found five separate faults on the election process, thereof it considered two of them serious faults.

- The ballot papers had bar-codes printed in consecutive numerical order; this was considered a serious fault of the election process and deemed an infringement of laws mandating a secret ballot, which the Court considered "a fundamental provision of the Icelandic Constitution concerning public elections".
- Cardboard dividers had been used in place of election booths, in breach of Icelandic law requiring the use of closed booths for the electorate to cast their vote. The use of cardboard dividers was considered a fault of the election process, "the fact it was possible to glance a voter's ballot paper, which took some time to fill out if all options were exercised, is likely to restrict the right of the voter to exercise his vote freely if someone, whom he is dependent upon, could observe him or if the voter had reason to suspect that this could happen".
- The legal requirement that ballot papers should be folded, before being cast, was not followed. According to the Supreme Court, this rule was intended to "secure the right of the voter to cast his ballot in secret". A majority of the Supreme Court considered this a fault of the election process. Supreme Court Justices Garðar Gíslason and Viðar Már Matthíasson were of a different opinion in regards to this, and did not consider the process unlawful.
- According to the Supreme Court, the ballot boxes did not conform to Icelandic law, since it was not possible to secure them with a lock. Furthermore, the Supreme Court considered the ballot boxes "of a make so that it was possible without much effort to disassemble them and access ballot papers. The make and quality of the ballot boxes was thus conductive to reduce the security and secrecy of the election". This was considered a fault of the election process.
- According to the Supreme Court, the legislative Acts concerning elections mandated that the National Electoral Commission had to draft persons to observe the electoral process. The Supreme Court stated that since there had been doubt as to how to interpret 13–15% of the votes during the election, such observers had been of special importance to guard the rights of the candidates. The Supreme Court considered this a serious fault of the election process.

The Supreme Court referred to the fact that it was the role of the legislature to establish clear and unambiguous rules for the conduct of public elections which take into account the circumstances resulting from their special nature. It was however not lawful for the government to deviate from the clear provisions of the laws concerning elections, because of the number of candidates or because of new procedures thought suitable for electronic tallying of votes.

The Court further pointed to case law supporting its decision. There was precedent for declaring elections null and void when the election process was in breach of law and suited to violate election secrecy. For example, elections in Helgafellssveit regarding the unification of municipalities had been declared null and void because the ballot paper was of such a make that it was possible to see writing though it, even though it was folded. In its reasoning in that case the Supreme Court said:

The ballot paper does thus not ensure, that the election is secret in accordance to Article 17 of Act no. 8/1986, which is among fundamental provisions in Icelandic law concerning public elections, pursuant to Article 87. and Article 91. of Act no. 80/1987 and Article 31. of the Icelandic Constitution. A fault in this regard is by its very nature conductive to influence the outcome of elections

Another precedent was the election to a Municipal Commission in Geithellnahreppur 25 June 1978, declared null and void because of faults in election secrecy. The ballot papers were of such a make that it was possible to see writing through them when folded. The Supreme Court stated:

We concur with the District Court decision, that the ballot paper was not of the make that is prescribed by law in Article 50. of Act no. 52/1959, pursuant to Article 1. of Act no. 5/1962, pursuant to Article 1. of Act no. 5/1966 and the principal rule of Article 7., 2. para, of Act no. 5/1962, and does not ensure, that the elections are secret. The provisions of Article 15., 1. para., of Act no. 58/1961, which stipulates, that these elections should be secret, is certainly among the fundamental provisions in Icelandic law concerning public elections.

According to Þorvaldur Gylfason (the most popular candidate in the election) this was 'a bizarre technical complaint about the way the election to the constituent assembly had been conducted'.

After receiving their election certificate (kjörbréf) on 2 December 2010, the elected delegates were informed on 27 January 2011, that the election certificates had been revoked by the National Election Commission. The following day, all of the Commission members tendered their resignation citing the circumstances that had arisen and the harmony necessary for the commission to carry out its functions.

Non-legal opposition was more widespread, and not confined to the Independence Party. The Progressives, who had previously expressed strong support for a new constitution, changed course and joined the opposition to reform. Even within the new governing coalition of the Social Democratic Alliance and the Left-Green Movement, there were pockets of passive resistance to change as well as among some academics apparently disappointed that they had not been asked to rewrite the constitution.

=== Parliament appoints the candidates ===
Parliament began the same day to deliberate whether and how to continue the process. It was decided on 25 February 2011 that the elected assembly members would be appointed by Parliament to a Constitutional Council with basically the same role. A resolution passed which appointed most of the delegates that had been elected. The Parliament voted thus:

Vote	Count	Percentage
Yes	30	47.6%
No	21	33.3%
Abstained	7	11.1%
Not present	5	8%

All members of Parliament for the Independence Party were against this solution. Six of the seven who abstained were members of the governing coalition.

== The assembly's proposals ==
The constitution draft was finished on 29 July 2011 and presented to parliament on the same day.

The proposals included most of the recommendations of the 2010 National Assembly and were supported unanimously by the Constitutional Assembly itself. Among the more important ones were:

- 'one person, one vote' (in the existing system, a candidate 'requires much more votes to be elected as an MP in Reykjavik than in one of the more rural areas').
- a referendum on abolishing the state church (polls indicated 73% would vote in favour of separation of church and state);
- a number of changes to government, including not automatically making the biggest party's leader PM, introducing a ten-year limit for PM terms, and that a vote of no confidence should have to include a proposed replacement PM.
- obliging the state to provide internet access to all citizens;
- introducing a three-term limit for the President;
- allowing 15% of voters to put bills to parliament or call for a referendum on proposed laws;
- restricting government size to ten ministers, and barring ministers from being MPs at the same time; and
- declaring Iceland's natural resources public property.

According to Thorvaldur Gylfason,

After delivering the bill to parliament, the constitutional council disbanded. The parliament took over, seeking further comments from local lawyers as well as, ultimately, from the Venice Commission. The parliament was encouraged to translate the bill into English so as to be able to solicit foreign expert opinion, but failed to respond. Instead, a translation was arranged and paid for by the Constitutional Society, a private nonprofit organization. This translation made it possible for world-renowned constitutional experts such as Prof. Jon Elster from Columbia University and Prof. Tom Ginsburg from the University of Chicago to express their helpful views of the bill.

== Referendum ==
A non-binding constitutional referendum was held in Iceland on 20 October 2012. It had originally been scheduled to coincide with the presidential election of June 2012 but was delayed due to opposition from the Independence Party and Progressive Party.

Voters were asked whether they approved of six proposals included in the new draft constitution:

1. Do you wish the Constitution Council's proposals to form the basis of a new draft Constitution?
2. In the new Constitution, do you want natural resources that are not privately owned to be declared national property?
3. Would you like to see provisions in the new Constitution on an established (national) church in Iceland?
4. Would you like to see a provision in the new Constitution authorising the election of particular individuals to the Althingi more than is the case at present?
5. Would you like to see a provision in the new Constitution giving equal weight to votes cast in all parts of the country?
6. Would you like to see a provision in the new Constitution stating that a certain proportion of the electorate is able to demand that issues are put to a referendum?

All six questions were approved by voters, including Question 3 which had gone against the Assembly's proposal.

== The stalling of the bill before the 2013 parliamentary election ==
The referendum provided a clear but non-binding guide from the Icelandic electorate to their politicians. To become law, it needed to pass as a motion in the Althingi.

Further deliberation included media commentary from a range of parties, much of it negative. However, Thorvaldur Gylfason notes that these parties had had an opportunity to air their views before the referendum and had not done so, suggesting that 'it seems that the dissenting academics hoped the bill would be rejected in the referendum and thought it unnecessary to discuss it'. The Venice Commission (an advisory body of the Council of Europe, composed of independent experts in the field of constitutional law) also produced a report on the constitution, leading to some alterations.

The bill was now ready to receive a parliamentary vote, and was supported by a majority of MPs. However, partly through filibuster by the opposition, the bill did not come before parliament for a vote before recess was called prior to the 2013 Icelandic parliamentary election. This election was won by opponents to the new constitution, though the constitution was not a major part of their election platform. The bill appears to have been put on ice and its future is uncertain. The judgement of Thorvaldur Gylfason is:

It is one thing not to hold a promised referendum on a parliamentary bill as was done in the Faroe Islands. It is quite another thing to disrespect the overwhelming result of a constitutional referendum by putting democracy on ice as is now being attempted in Iceland by putting a new constitution already accepted by the voters into the hands of a parliamentary committee chaired by a sworn enemy of constitutional reform as if no referendum had taken place. Parliament is playing with fire. It risks the demotion of Iceland from the club of full-fledged democracies.

More positively, he has elsewhere written that 'As always, however, there will be a new parliament after this one. One day, most probably, the constitutional bill approved by the people of Iceland in the 2012 referendum or a similar one will become the law of the land'.
