= Constitutional convention =

Constitutional convention may refer to:

- Constitutional convention (political custom), an informal and uncodified procedural agreement
- Constitutional convention (political meeting), a meeting of delegates to adopt a new constitution or revise an existing constitution

== Specific conventions ==
- Constitutional Convention (Australia), any of four gatherings in 1891, 1897–98, 1973, and 1998
  - 1998 Australian Constitutional Convention
- Constitutional Convention (Ireland), established in 2012
- Constitutional Convention (Philippines)
- Scottish Constitutional Convention
- Constitutional conventions of the United Kingdom
- Icelandic constitutional convention, 2010–2013
- Constitutional Convention (Chile), 2021–2022, drafting a new Political Constitution

=== United States ===
- Constitutional Convention (United States), wrote the current U. S. Constitution in 1787
- Convention to propose amendments to the United States Constitution, one of two processes for proposing amendments
- Second Constitutional Convention of the United States, a proposal to reform and rewrite the Constitution
- California Constitutional Conventions

== See also ==
- Constituent Assembly (disambiguation)
- Constitutional Commission
