= Tryggvi Þór Herbertsson =

Icelandic politician and businessman

Member of the Althing
- In office 2009–2013
- Constituency: Northeast

Personal details
- Born: 17 January 1963 (age 62) Neskaupstaður, Iceland
- Political party: Independence Party

Tryggvi Þór Herbertsson (born 17 January 1963) was a member of the Icelandic Parliament from 2009 to 2013, and is the chairman and founder of Taurus SLF, an independent corporate and investment advisory firm.

== Education and academic work ==
Tryggvi Thor Herbertsson graduated in industrial administration from the Technical College of Iceland in 1992, as a M.Sc. in economics from the University of Iceland in 1995, and finished his Ph.D. studies at the University of Aarhus in 1998. He was director of the Institute of Economic Studies at the University of Iceland from 1995 to 2006. He was lecturer (1995), associate professor (1998) and professor (2000) at the University of Iceland. He has been a professor of economics at Reykjavik University since 2009 (currently on leave). He is married to Sigurveig María Ingvadóttir and has four children.

== Works ==
Tryggvi Thor Herbertsson is an independent investor and advisor at his own company, Taurus SLF. He was a Member of Parliament in Iceland from 2009 to 2013 for the conservative Independence Party, and a professor of economics at the University of Reykjavík (on leave). Before becoming an MP he was the CEO of Askar Capital (a Nordic investment bank). He served as the special economic advisor to the prime minister of Iceland during the collapse of the Icelandic banking system. He was the director of the Institute of Economic Studies and a professor of economics at the University of Iceland before joining Askar Capital. Herbertsson has been a member of and chaired many ministerial-appointed committees in Iceland.

Herbertsson has been on the board of directors and a consultant to many private companies and pension funds. He has been a consultant to institutions and international organizations, such as the World Bank, the International Monetary Fund, the European Commission, the Nordic Council of Ministers, the OECD, and the World Economic Forum. He has also been a consultant to the governments of Belgium, Croatia, Denmark, Finland, Iceland, Norway, Sweden, and Uganda. He has been a consultant to Fortune 500 companies.

Herbertsson has published over 50 scholarly papers and is the editor, author, and co-author of 13 books and monographs on various topics in economics. His dissertation topic was economic growth and capital theory. His research fields include public policy, financial markets and banking, monetary policy, pensions, and general macroeconomics.

During his 11 years as the director of the Institute of Economic Studies, Herbertsson was responsible and directed over 100 major consulting assignments in number of countries. In his native country Herbertsson was a consultant to the country's prime ministers on macroeconomic policies and financial markets between 1995 and 2008.

As the CEO of Askar Capital, Herbertsson work involved overseeing investments into China, Macao, Hong Kong, India, Turkey, Dubai, Romania, North Macedonia, the Baltic Countries, Northern Europe, and the US.

== Selected publications ==
- Gylfason, T., Herbertsson, T. T., & Zoega, G. (1999). A mixed blessing. Macroeconomic Dynamics, 3(02), 204-225.
- Gylfason, T., & Herbertsson, T. T. (2001). Does inflation matter for growth?. Japan and the World Economy, 13(4), 405-428.
- Mishkin, F. S., & Herbertsson, T. T. (2006). Financial stability in Iceland. Iceland Chamber of Commerce.

== Parliamentary career ==
Hebertsson was elected to the Icelandic parliament in the 2009 general election.
