= Pawel Bartoszek =

Polish-Icelandic politician

Paweł Bartoszek
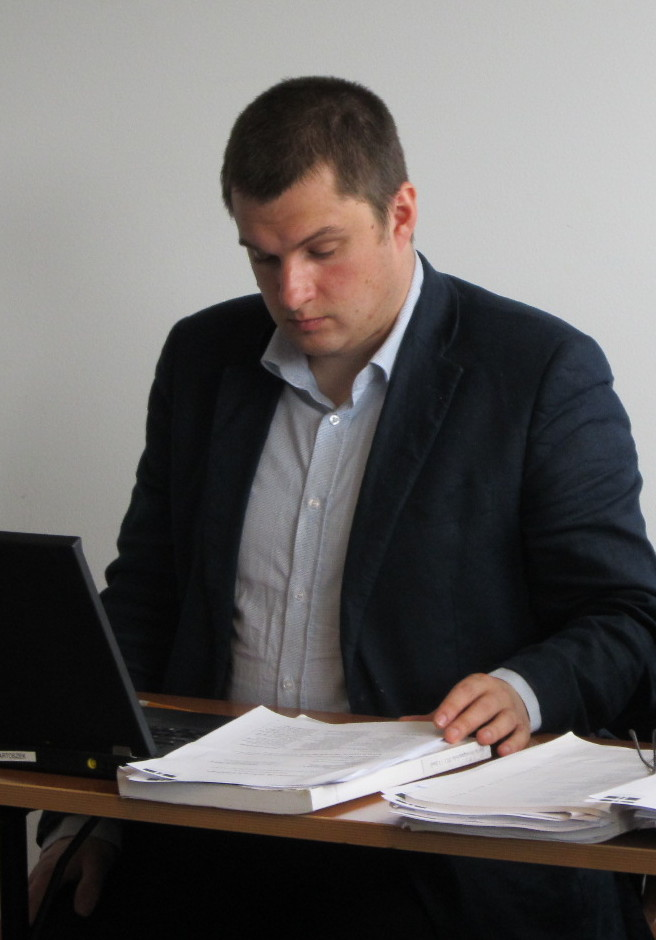
- Bartoszek in 2011
- Born: 25 September 1980 (age 46); Poznań, Poland

Paweł Bartoszek (born 25 September 1980 Poland) is a Polish-born Icelandic politician. In 2010 he was elected in the Constitutional Assembly election. In the 2016 Icelandic parliamentary election, he was elected as a Member of the Althing, representing Viðreisn. In the 2018 Icelandic municipal elections, he was elected to the Reykjavík City Council. In the 2024 Icelandic parliamentary election, he was once again elected, representing Viðreisn. He serves as chairman of the Foreign Affairs Committee since 2025. Bartoszek holds a master's degree in mathematics from the University of Iceland.
