= Edmund Phelps =

American economist (1933–2026)

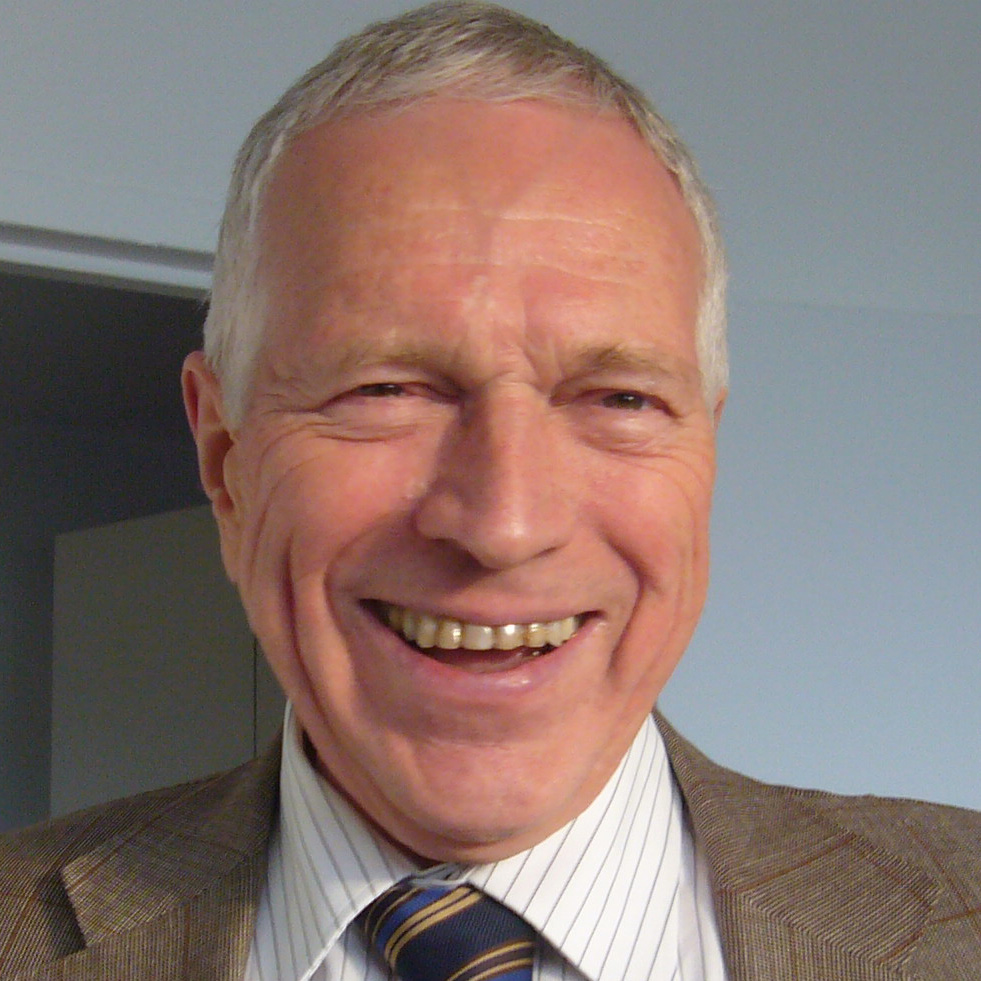
- Phelps in 2008
- Born: Edmund Strother Phelps; July 26, 1933; Evanston, Illinois, U.S.
- Died: May 15, 2026 (aged 92); New York City, U.S.
- Spouse: Viviana Montdor (m. 1974)

Academic background
- Education: Amherst College (BA); Yale University (PhD)
- Thesis: A test for the presence of cost inflation in the United States economy, 1955-1957 (1959)
- Doctoral advisor: James Tobin; Arthur Okun
- Influences: Paul Samuelson; William Fellner; Thomas Schelling; John Rawls

Academic work
- Discipline: Macroeconomics
- Institutions: RAND Corporation; Cowles Foundation; University of Pennsylvania; Columbia University
- Doctoral students: Gylfi Zoega
- Notable ideas: Microfoundations of macroeconomics Expectations in wage and price-setting Natural rate of unemployment Statistical discrimination Structural slumps Imagination in innovating Golden Rule rate of saving
- Awards: Nobel Memorial Prize in Economic Sciences, 2006; Chevalier de la Legion d'Honneur, 2008; Pico Mirandola Prize, 2008; Global Economy Prize, 2008; China Friendship Award, 2014

Edmund Strother Phelps (July 26, 1933 – May 15, 2026) was an American economist and the recipient of the 2006 Nobel Memorial Prize in Economic Sciences.

Early in his career, he became known for his research at Yale's Cowles Foundation in the first half of the 1960s on the sources of economic growth. His demonstration of the golden rule savings rate, a concept related to work by John von Neumann, started a wave of research on how much a nation should spend on present consumption rather than save and invest for future generations.

Phelps was at the University of Pennsylvania from 1966 to 1971 and moved to Columbia University in 1971. His most seminal work inserted a microfoundation, one featuring imperfect information, incomplete knowledge and expectations about wages and prices, to support a macroeconomic theory of employment determination and price-wage dynamics. That led to his development of the natural rate of unemployment: its existence and the mechanism governing its size. In the early 2000s, he turned to the study of business innovation.

From 2001 he was the founding director of Columbia's Center on Capitalism and Society. He was McVickar Professor of Political Economy at Columbia from 1982 to 2021. On January 1, 2022, his title changed to McVickar Professor Emeritus of Political Economy.

== Early life and education ==
Phelps was born on July 26, 1933, in Evanston, Illinois. When he was six, he moved with his family to Hastings-on-Hudson, New York, where he spent his school years. In 1951, he went to Amherst College for his undergraduate education. On his father's advice, Phelps enrolled in his first economics course in his second year at Amherst. Economist James Nelson gave the course, which was based on the famous textbook Economics by Paul Samuelson. Phelps was strongly impressed with the possibility of applying formal analysis to business. He quickly became aware of an important unsolved problem with the existing economic theory and the existing gap between microeconomics and macroeconomics.

After receiving his B.A. at Amherst in 1955, Phelps went to Yale University for graduate studies. At Yale, he studied under future Nobel laureates James Tobin and Thomas Schelling, among others. Phelps was also strongly influenced by William Fellner whose course emphasized the expectations of agents. Phelps received his Ph.D. in Economics from Yale in 1959.

== Research in 1960s and 1970s ==
After receiving his Ph.D., Phelps went to work as an economist for the RAND Corporation. However, feeling he could not pursue macroeconomics at RAND (which focused on defense work), Phelps decided to return to the academic world. In 1960, he took a research position at the Cowles Foundation while he was also teaching at Yale. At the Cowles Foundation, his research focused mainly on neoclassical growth theory, following the seminal work of Robert Solow. As part of his research, in 1961 Phelps published a famous paper on the Golden Rule savings rate, one of his major contributions to economic science. He also wrote papers dealing with other areas of economic theory, such as monetary economics or Ricardian equivalence and its relation to optimal growth.

His position at Cowles gave Phelps the chance to interact with Arthur Okun and other notables in the field. He was able to collaborate with other top economists working on growth theory, including David Cass and fellow future Nobel prize laureates Tjalling Koopmans. During the 1962–63 academic year, Phelps visited MIT, where he was in contact with future Nobel Prize winners Paul Samuelson, Robert Solow, and Franco Modigliani.

In 1966, Phelps left Yale and moved to the University of Pennsylvania to take up a tenured position as a professor of economics. At Penn, Phelps's research focused mainly on the link between employment, wage setting and inflation. His first pioneering paper on this topic was in 1967. In this paper he developed a rigorous model of the Expectations Augmented Phillips Curve. He worked out solution values for many macro variables by maximizing the discounted value of social welfare utility function, bases on inflation and unemployment. Phelps (1967) labelled U* in his model as the equilibrium unemployment rate and also the warranted rate, but himself later started using the term natural rate. (Moorthy 2026)

In his next and more influential 1968 paper "Money-Wage Dynamics and Labor Market Equilibrium" Phelps laid out his framework.. In Phelps's model, since there may be involuntary unemployment even at the natural rate, a full catch-up for money wages in response to price increases may not hold. Money wage dynamics are largely driven by the decisions of firms.

The research contributed important insights in the microeconomics of the Phillips curve, including the role of expectations (in the form of adaptive expectations) and imperfect information in the setting of wages and prices. It also introduced the concept of the natural rate of unemployment and argued that labor market equilibrium is independent of the rate of inflation and so there is no long-run tradeoff between unemployment and inflation. That, if accurate, would have the crucial implication that the Keynesian policy of demand management has only transitory effects and so cannot be used to control the long-term rate of unemployment in the economy. In January 1969, Phelps organized a conference at Penn in support of the research on the microfoundations of inflation and employment determination. The conference papers were published the next year in a book that had a strong and lasting influence; it became known as the "Phelps volume". Along with his research on the Phillips curve, Phelps also collaborated with other economists on research regarding economic growth, the effects of monetary and fiscal policy, and optimal population growth.

In the following years, an element in Phelps's foundations came under heavy criticism with the introduction of John Muth's rational expectations, which was popularized by future Nobel prize winner Robert Lucas, Jr. Phelps, with Calvo and John Taylor, started a program to rebuild Keynesian economics with rational expectations by employing sticky wages and prices. They did so by explicitly incorporating in models the fact that wage contracts are set in advance for multiple periods, an idea originating from Phelps's 1968 paper. This research led to a paper published with Taylor in 1977, proving that staggered wage setting gives monetary policy a role in stabilizing economic fluctuations. The use of staggered wage and price setting, further developed by Calvo in a 1983 paper, became a cornerstone of New Keynesian economics. During the 1970s, Phelps and Calvo also collaborated on research on optimal contracts under asymmetric information.

Phelps spent 1969–70 at the Center for Advanced Study in Behavioral Science at Stanford University. Discussions with fellow futire Nobel prize winners Amartya Sen and Kenneth Arrow and especially the influence of the philosophy of John Rawls, whom he met during the year at the center, led Phelps to undertake some research outside macroeconomics. As a result, in 1972, he published seminal research in the new field that he named statistical discrimination. He also published research on economic justice, applying ideas from Rawls's A Theory of Justice.

In 1971, Phelps moved to the Economics Department at Columbia University, which also included future Nobel prize winners William Vickrey and James J. Heckman (future laureate Robert Mundell joined three years later), as well as Phoebus Dhrymes, Guillermo Calvo, and John B. Taylor. There, he published research on the inflation tax and the impact of fiscal policy on optimal inflation. In 1972, Phelps published a new book which focused on the derivation of policy implications of his new theory. The book further popularized his "expectations-augmented Phillips curve" and introduced the concept of hysteresis with regard to unemployment (prolonged unemployment is partially irreversible as workers lose skill and become demoralized).

In the late 1970s, Phelps and one of his former students, Roman Frydman, conducted some research on the implications of assuming rational expectations, at first independently and then in collaboration. Their results suggested that rational expectations are not the correct way to model agents' expectations. They organized a conference on the issue in 1981 and published the proceedings in a 1983 book. However, as rational expectations were becoming the standard in macroeconomics, the book was initially received with hostility and was largely ignored. The 2008 financial crisis, along with the failure of rational expectations models to predict it, led to a renewed interest in the work.

== Research in 1980s ==
In 1982, he was appointed the McVickar Professor of Political Economy at Columbia University. During the early 1980s, he wrote an introductory textbook synthesizing contemporary economics knowledge. The book, Political Economy, was published in 1985 but had limited classroom adoption.

In the 1980s, Phelps increased collaboration with European universities and institutions, including Banca d'Italia, where he spent most of his 1985–86 sabbatical, and Observatoire Français des Conjonctures Économiques (OFCE) in Paris. He became interested in the puzzle of the persistent high unemployment in Europe, despite there not being any pause in inflation and published on the subject with Jean-Paul Fitoussi (the director of OFCE). Further study led Phelps to believe that it is not a transitory phenomenon but the effect of changes in equilibrium unemployment. During the following years, Phelps tried to build a theory to determine endogenously the natural rate of unemployment. He published partial research results in a 1994 book, Structural Slumps: The Modern Equilibrium Theory of Employment, Interest and Assets. Phelps also collaborated closely with Luigi Paganetto at the University of Rome Tor Vergata and, between 1988 and 1998, as co-organizers of the Villa Mondragone International Seminar.

== Research in 1990s ==
In 1990 Phelps took part in a mission from the new EBRD to Moscow, where he and Kenneth Arrow designed a proposal for the reform of the Soviet Union. After the EBRD was established, he became a member of its Economic Advisory Board, where he stayed until 1993. From his work at EBRD and collaboration with his former student, Roman Frydman, Phelps developed a strong interest in Eastern Europe's transition economies.

Over the late 1980s and the early 1990s, Phelps created a new non-monetary theory of employment in which business asset values drive the natural rate. The theory, first fully set out in his book Structural Slumps (1994), explains Europe's slump without disinflation in the 1980s: the elevation of the world real rate of interest, declining opportunities for continuing technological catching up, and the mushrooming social wealth granted by Europe's emerging welfare state play the main causal roles. Two sequel papers in 2000 and 2001 on the theory of "structural booms" explained U.S. inflationless expansion in the late 1990s and claimed its transience. His papers develop the thesis that the great economic swings experienced by the West in the past century not only originate in non-monetary shocks but also operate fundamentally by non-monetary mechanisms. This book, as well as subsequent papers, argued that the fluctuation of unemployment rates in the United States, the United Kingdom, and France stemmed from the accumulation of wealth with minimal investment.

In the mid-1990s, his research turned to what he called economic inclusion. In 1997 he published a book for the general public, Rewarding Work about the causes and cures of the joblessness and low wages among disadvantaged workers.

== Later work ==
Phelps's later work was about the benefits and sources of a country's structural dynamism: the enterprise and creativity of entrepreneurs, the skill of financiers in selecting and supporting the best projects, and the knowledge managers draw upon in evaluating and making use of new methods and products. Every dynamic economy has its doldrums and even torpid economies may rise, perhaps with delay, to an extraordinary opportunity. However, great dynamism, he argued, brings advantages in virtually every dimension of economic performance, not just in productivity. For Phelps, the challenges presented in a creative and evolving business sector provide most people with their main vehicle for the exploration, exercise, and development of their talents.

In the already-advanced economies, that is perhaps the best reason that policy should aim to build a business sector of high dynamism and broad inclusion. The research task is to identify the institutions that are pathways to dynamism and the institutions that are obstructions.

Phelps's own research on dynamism began at the European Bank for Reconstruction and Development in 1990 and 1992–93, where he worked on the theory of capitalism and issues of mass privatization in Eastern Europe. Later in the decade, he turned to studying a range of economic institutions in Western Europe and the United States. He conducted research with a focus on the Italian economy as Senior Advisor to Italy in Europe of the Consiglio Nazionale delle Ricerche from 1997 to 2000.

In 2001, Phelps, Roman Frydman and others founded the Center on Capitalism & Society at Columbia to promote and conduct research on capitalism.

In 2008, writing in the wake of the Great Recession, Phelps criticized the "false" models of neoclassical economics, but he also wrote with skepticism regarding Keynesian resurgence:

What theory can we use to get us out of the impending slump quickly and reliably? To use the "new classical" theory of fluctuations begun at Chicago in the 1970s – the theory in which the "risk management" models are embedded – is unthinkable, since it is precisely the theory falsified by the asset price collapse. The thoughts of some have turned to John Maynard Keynes. His insights into uncertainty and speculation were deep. Yet his employment theory was problematic and the "Keynesian" policy solutions are questionable at best... At the end of his life, Keynes wrote of "modernist stuff, gone wrong and turned sour and silly". He told his friend Friedrich Hayek he intended to re-examine his theory in his next book. He would have moved on. The admiration we all have for Keynes's fabulous contributions should not sway us from moving on.

From around 2006 on, Phelps's main research focus had been innovation and economic growth as fueled by the creativity of ordinary people within a nation. His book Mass Flourishing (2013) remarks that cavemen had the ability to imagine new things and the zeal to create them, but a culture liberating and inspiring dynamism is necessary to ignite what Lincoln called a "passion for the new". These theses on the central role of values for indigenous innovation and the good life are tested in the book Dynamism, coauthored with Raicho Bojilov, Hian Teck Hoon, and Gylfi Zoega, which was published by Harvard University Press in 2020.

Phelps severely criticized the economic policy of U.S. president Donald Trump. It feels "like economic policy at a time of fascism [...] The leader controls the economy and tells the companies how things are going to be done." In June 2024, 16 Nobel Prize in Economics laureates, including Phelps, signed an open letter arguing that Donald Trump's fiscal and trade policies coupled with efforts to limit the Federal Reserve's independence would reignite inflation in the United States.

In June 2020, he and other Nobel laureates in Economics, as well as architects, chefs, and leaders of international organizations, signed the International Appeal of 7 June 2020 in favor of the purple economy ("Towards a cultural renaissance of the economy"), published in Corriere della Sera, El País, and Le Monde.

== Personal life and death ==
In 1974 Phelps married Viviana Montdor. Publications have noted that despite his many accomplishments, Phelps did not own a car.

Phelps died from Alzheimer's disease in Manhattan on May 15, 2026, at the age of 92.

== Honors and awards ==
In 1981 Phelps was elected to become a member of the National Academy of Sciences in the USA. In 2006, he was awarded the Sveriges Riksbank Prize in Economic Sciences in Memory of Alfred Nobel, referred to, colloquially, as the Nobel Prize in Economics for "his analysis of inter-temporal tradeoffs in macroeconomic policy." In announcing the prize, the Royal Swedish Academy of Sciences said Phelps's work had "deepened our understanding of the relation between short-run and long-run effects of economic policy."

In the year 2000, Phelps was made a Distinguished Fellow of the American Economic Association. In February 2008, he was named Chevalier of France's Legion of Honor. Four months later he was given the Global Economy Prize of Kiel Institute for the World Economy. In 2014, he received the People's Republic of China ₪Government's Friendship Award and the Wilbur Lucius Cross Medal from Yale University.

Furthermore, Phelps received honorary degrees from several renowned institutions acknowledging his academic work. In 1985, he was awarded an honorary degree from his alma mater, Amherst College. In June 2001, he received an honorary doctorate from the University of Mannheim and, in October 2003, from Universidade Nova de Lisboa; in July 2004, from Paris Dauphine University, and in October 2004, from the University of Iceland. He also held honorary doctorates from the Institut d'Etudes Politiques de Paris (2006), the University of Buenos Aires (2007), Tsinghua University (2007), and the Université libre de Bruxelles (2010). From 2010 to 2016, he served as the Dean of the New Huadu Business School at Minjiang University in Fuzhou, Fujian, PRC.

== Bibliography ==
- Phelps, Edmund S. (1961). "The Golden Rule of Capital Accumulation". American Economic Review. 51: 638–43.
- Phelps, Edmund S. (1966). Golden Rules of Economic Growth: Studies of Efficient and Optimal Investment. W. W. Norton, New York. ISBN 0-393-09708-0.
- Phelps, Edmund S. (1966). "Models of Technical Progress and the Golden Rule of Research" (PDF). Review of Economic Studies. 33 (2). The Review of Economic Studies Ltd.: 133–46. doi:10.2307/2974437. JSTOR 2974437.
- Phelps, Edmund S. (1968). "Money-Wage Dynamics and Labor Market Equilibrium". Journal of Political Economy. 76 (S4): 678–711. doi:10.1086/259438. S2CID 154427979.
- Phelps, Edmund S.; et al. (1970). Microeconomic Foundations of Employment and Inflation Theory. W. W. Norton, New York. ISBN 0-393-09326-3.
- Phelps, Edmund S. (1972). Inflation Policy and Unemployment Theory. W. W. Norton, New York. ISBN 0-393-09395-6.
- Phelps, Edmund S. (1972). "The Statistical Theory of Racism and Sexism". American Economic Review. 62: 659–61.
- Phelps, Edmund S.; John B. Taylor (1977). "Stabilizing Powers of Monetary Policy under Rational Expectations". Journal of Political Economy. 85 (1): 163–90. doi:10.1086/260550. S2CID 14729818.
- Phelps, Edmund S., Roman Frydman; et al. (1983). Individual Forecasting and Aggregate Outcomes: 'Rational Expectations' Examined. Cambridge University Press. ISBN 0-521-25744-1.
- Phelps, Edmund S. (1990). Seven Schools of Macroeconomic Thought. Oxford University Press. ISBN 978-0-19-828333-1.
- Phelps, Edmund S. (1994). Structural Slumps: The Modern Equilibrium Theory of Employment, Interest and Assets. Harvard University Press. ISBN 0-674-84373-8.
- Phelps, Edmund S. (1997). Rewarding Work: How to Restore Participation and Self-Support to Free Enterprise. Harvard University Press. ISBN 978-0-674-02694-0.
- Phelps, Edmund S. (2003). Designing Inclusion. Cambridge University Press. ISBN 0-521-81695-5.
- Phelps, Edmund S. (October 2009). "Economic Justice and the Spirit of Innovation". First Things.
- Phelps, Edmund S. (2009), "The good life and the good economy: the humanist perspective of Aristotle, the pragmatists and the vitalists, and the economic justice of John Rawls", in Kanbur, Ravi; Basu, Kaushik (eds.), Arguments for a better world: essays in honor of Amartya Sen | Volume I: Ethics, welfare, and measurement, Oxford New York: Oxford University Press, pp. 35–49, ISBN 978-0-19-923911-5.
- Phelps, Edmund S. (2013). Mass Flourishing: How Grass Roots Innovation Created Jobs, Challenge, and Change. Princeton University Press. ISBN 978-0-691-15898-3.
- Phelps, Edmund S. (2023). My Journeys in Economic Theory. Columbia University Press. ISBN 978-0-231-20730-0.

Awards
Preceded by Robert J. Aumann; Thomas C. Schelling	Laureate of the Nobel Memorial Prize in Economics; 2006	Succeeded by Leonid Hurwicz; Eric S. Maskin; Roger B. Myerson
