= Constituent Assembly (disambiguation) =

A constituent assembly is a body of representatives convened to draft and adopt a new constitution for a country.

Constituent assembly may specifically refer to:

- Constituent Assembly of Georgia
- Constituent Assembly of India
- Constituent Assembly of Italy
- Constituent Assembly of Lithuania
- Constituent Assembly of Luxembourg
- 1st Constituent Assembly of Nepal
- 2nd Constituent Assembly of Nepal
- Constituent Assembly of Pakistan
- Constituent Assembly of the Republic of Montenegro
- Constituent Assembly of Tunisia
- Constituent Assembly of Turkey
- Constituent Assembly (Philippines)

== See also ==
- Constitutional convention (disambiguation)
