= Thorvaldur Gylfason =

Icelandic economist (born 1951)

- Þorvaldur Gylfason
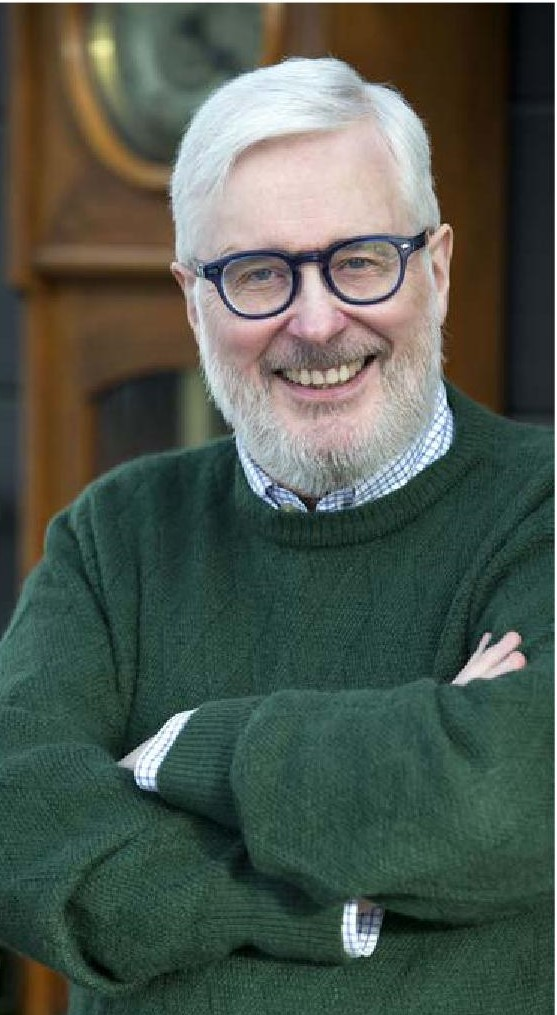
- Thorvaldur Gylfason in [Year]
- Born: July 18, 1951 (age 75); Reykjavík, Iceland
- Education: University of Manchester (B.A.); Princeton University (Ph.D.)
- Occupations: Economist, composer, public intellectual
- Employer: University of Iceland
- Known for: Research on natural resources & growth, Icelandic constitutional reform
- Notable work: Principles of Economic Growth; Understanding the Market Economy (with Isachsen & Hamilton)
- Title: Professor Emeritus of Economics
- Term: since 2021
- Board member of: Icelandic Opera Society (former chair), Reykjavík Vocal Academy (board member)
- Parent(s): Gylfi Þ. Gíslason (father), Guðrún Vilmundardóttir (mother)
- Relatives: Þorsteinn Gylfason (brother), Vilmundur Gylfason (brother)

Thorvaldur Gylfason (Icelandic orthography Þorvaldur Gylfason; born 18 July 1951) is an Icelandic economist and composer who has been active in Icelandic public life as well as internationally. His research explores, among others, the relationship between natural resources and economic growth, focusing on the potential for resource-rich countries to transition from excessive resource dependence to economic and political diversification, including democracy.

== Education ==
Following his matriculation from Reykjavik College in 1970, he received his B.A. (Honours) degree in economics at the University of Manchester in 1973. He earned his Ph.D. degree in economics at Princeton University in 1976, with a dissertation entitled Inflation, Unemployment, and Economic Growth: Two Essays, supervised by Professor William H. Branson.

== Constitution of Iceland ==
On 27 November 2010, he was elected to be a delegate at the 2011 Icelandic Constitutional Assembly, which, after four months’ deliberations, unanimously adopted and then delivered to Parliament a bill that was subsequently accepted as a basis for a new Icelandic constitution with 67% of the vote in a national referendum called by Parliament in 2012, but the bill remains to be ratified by Parliament. In 2013, he led Democracy Watch, a political party contesting the April 2013 parliamentary election in Iceland in support of the new constitution against Parliament’s failure to ratify the bill, but without success. The bill contains important judicial reforms, not least by defining Iceland´s natural resources as the “common and perpetual property of the nation” and by prescribing “equal weight” of votes cast in parliamentary elections, among other provisions aiming to strengthen democracy, environmental protection and more.

== Career ==
Gylfason has been professor of economics at the University of Iceland since 1983, research professor 1998–2004, and professor emeritus since 2021. He was visiting professor of public and international affairs at Princeton 1986–1988. Prior to this he was an economist at the International Monetary Fund (IMF) in Washington, DC, 1976–1981, in the Exchange and Trade Relations Department (ETR) and briefly the Asian Department, and thereafter a frequent consultant to the Fund until 2013, in the Research Department and the IMF Institute for Capacity Development.

Thorvaldur has been active in economic research, teaching, and international policy advice and debate as senior research fellow at the Institute for International Economic Studies (IIES) at Stockholm University 1978–1996, research associate at the Center for Business and Policy Studies (SNS) in Stockholm 1996–2004, research fellow at the Centre for Economic Policy Research (CEPR) in London 1987–2009, external research fellow at the Oxford Centre for the Analysis of Resource-Rich Economies (Oxcarre) at Oxford since 2007, and research associate at the Center for Economic Studies (CESifo) at LMU Munich since 1999. He was one of five editors of the European Economic Review 2002–2010 and is a fellow of the European Economic Association where he was Council Member (elected position) 1992–1996. Further, he has been and remains associate editor of several international economics journals. In addition to the IMF, he has been a consultant to the World Bank, the European Commission, the European Free Trade Association (EFTA), the United Nations Development Programme (UNDP), and the United Nations Framework Convention on Climate Change (UNFCCC) as well as the Central Bank of Iceland 1984–1993. He was during 1986–1990 chair of the Board of Directors of Kaupthing, a successful securities firm which, following a 2003 merger with the Agricultural Bank of Iceland, then a newly privatized state bank, went astray and collapsed in 2008 with the rest of Iceland’s financial system. He held short-term visiting research positions at CESifo in Munich in 1999, University of Copenhagen 2000, Stockholm School of Economics 2010, 2012, and 2017, and Bellagio Center of the Rockefeller Foundation in 2019. During 1988–1994 he was chair of the Board of Directors of the Icelandic Opera Society. Since 2010, he has been a member of the Board of Directors of the Reykjavík Vocal Academy.

== Publications ==
In the field of economics, Gylfason has published some 300 scientific papers in international journals and books as well as numerous books, including eight volumes of essays in his native Icelandic and four books of sheet music containing his compositions. He co-authored Understanding the Market Economy (1992) with Arne Jon Isachsen and Carl B. Hamilton, a book that was translated into 17 languages, including Russian and Chinese, one of the first books introducing mainstream economics to readers in formerly communist countries. He also co-authored The Swedish Model under Stress: A View from the Stands (1997) with Torben Andersen, Seppo Honkapohja, Arne Jon Isachsen, and John Williamson and also Nordics in Global Crisis: Vulnerability and Resilience (2010) with Nobel laurate Bengt Holmström, Sixten Korkman, Hans Tson Söderström, and Vesa Vihriälä. He is the sole author of Principles of Economic Growth (1999), a nontechnical exposition of economic growth theory, published like Understanding the Market Economy by Oxford University Press.

He remains an active scholar. He has visited 100 countries, mostly for work, and worked with 36 co-authors from 18 countries. Recently, he has published a series of papers on Iceland's new constitution, another series comparing economic development in the three Baltic countries and Ukraine with their neighbors (with Eduard Hochreiter and Tadeusz Kowalski), yet another series of comparative papers on Uganda, Mongolia, and Madagascar (with Jean-Pascal Nguessa Nganou), and one more series on natural resources and their management (with Gylfi Zoega).

With a focus on macroeconomics, international economics, economic growth, natural resources, and constitutions, his research has accumulated over 12,000 citations. His most frequently cited works are:

- Natural resources, education, and economic development. European Economic Review 2001, 45(4–6), 847–859.
- A mixed blessing: Natural resources and economic growth. Macroeconomic Dynamics 1999, 3(2), 204–225 (with T T Herbertsson & G Zoega).
- Natural resources and economic growth: The role of investment. World Economy 2006, 29(8), 1091–1115 (with G Zoega).
- Nature, power and growth. Scottish Journal of Political Economy 2001, 48(5), 558–588.
- Does devaluation cause stagflation? Canadian Journal of Economics 1983, 16(4), 641–654 (with M Schmid).
- Natural resources and economic growth: From dependence to diversification. Ch. 10 in Broadman, H G, T Paas & P J J Welfens (eds.), Economic Liberalization and Integration Policy: Options for Eastern Europe and Russia, Springer, 2006, 201–231.
- Does inflation matter for growth? Japan and the World Economy 2001, 13(4), 405–428 (with T T Herbertsson)

== Public debate ==
In addition to some 1,100 columns for Icelandic news media since 1985, Gylfason has published about 100 opinion pieces and policy commentaries for various international platforms, including VoxEU, Social Europe, Milken Institute Review, Development Finance Agenda, Finance and Development, and Project Syndicate, covering a wide range of topics. Recent examples include

- Reversing the retreat of democracy: The case of Iceland (VoxEU 2020)
- Economics – An apology (Social Europe 2025)
- Odious assets (Milken Institute Review 2023)

== Creative works ==
In addition to his academic work, Gylfason has been active in the arts, particularly as a composer. He has published four song collections: Songs of Soaring Birds (2019), Five Seasons (2020), The Italian Songbook (2022), and The Icelandic Songbook (2023), setting poetry by Kristján Hreinsson and Snorri Hjartarson to music. These collections include 83 songs that have been performed and recorded by leading Icelandic artists. Other vocal works include Seventeen Sonnets on the Philosophy of the Heart (2012–2013), Seven Psalms (2014), and He Is Like Spring (2023).

The music film Icelandic Sounds in Italy, documenting a 2022 concert tour, premiered on Sweden’s Axess TV in 2024. He has also composed popular music, including Standing There, recorded at Abbey Road Studios in 2024, and Álfangar, performed by Egill Ólafsson.

Gylfason co-produced the documentary To Build a Nation (1998) with Jón Egill Bergþórsson. The film explores the history of Icelandic economic thought through figures such as Jón Sigurðsson, Einar Benediktsson, and Halldór Laxness.

== Private life ==
Gylfason is the son of former professor of economics and minister of education and commerce Gylfi Th. Gíslason and Guðrún Vilmundardóttir and brother of philosopher Thorsteinn Gylfason and politician Vilmundur Gylfason. He has been married since 1987 to Anna Karitas Bjarnadottir, teacher by training and insurance advisor by profession, with two grown foster-children and four grandchildren.
