= Roman Frydman =

Polish–American economist

Academic background
- Education: Columbia University; New York University
- Influences: Edmund Phelps

Academic work
- Discipline: Macroeconomics
- Institutions: New York University

Roman Frydman is a Polish–American economist at New York University and the author of more than ten books about macroeconomic theory and privatization. He is a founding Director of Project Syndicate.

Frydman's research, exemplified by his two recent books with Michael D. Goldberg, Imperfect Knowledge Economics: Exchange Rates and Risk (Princeton University Press, 2007) and Beyond Mechanical Markets: Asset Price, Swings, Risk, and the Role of the State (Princeton University Press, 2011), argues that markets cannot be predicted accurately by deterministic optimization models, particularly models promoted by adherents of the rational expectations hypothesis. Rather, Frydman argues that predictive models must take into account the role of contingent events, irrationality, imperfect knowledge and communication among the market participants. "Imperfect Knowledge Economics" presents a model that many critics have described as not only more flexible, but also more predictive of empirical events.

Frydman left Poland in 1968, after antisemitic campaign of Polish March. He did his undergraduate studies in physics and mathematics at Cooper Union, graduating in 1971. After earning a master's degree in mathematics and computer science from New York University in 1973, he began studying economics at Columbia University, receiving a second master's degree in 1976 and a Ph.D. in 1978. After working in central Europe for many years, he returned to NYU as a faculty member in 1995. In 2001, he founded the Center on Capitalism & Society at Columbia with his frequent collaborators, Nobel Memorial Prize winners Edmund Phelps and Joseph Stiglitz. He is a member of Institute for New Economic Thinking Academic Council, along with George Akerlof.
