= Comparative Constitutions Project =

Academic study of the world's constitutions

The Comparative Constitutions Project is an academic study of the content of the world's constitutions from 1789 to 2022, with yearly updates. The project was founded by Zachary Elkins and Tom Ginsburg in 2005 when they were colleagues at the University of Illinois and fellows at the Cline Center for Advanced Social Research. The primary objective of the project is to understand the origins and consequences of constitutional choices. Most of the seed money for the project came from the Cline Center, as well as two successive grants from the National Science Foundation. James Melton, a graduate student at Illinois, joined Elkins and Ginsburg as a full collaborator before leaving academia in 2015. The project continues to be administered by Elkins and Ginsburg as a collaboration between the University of Texas and the University of Chicago, where they are based, respectively.

== Project datasets ==
Data from the project is used primarily by scholars of comparative politics and comparative law. The data, particularly the repository of indexed texts (constitute), are also widely used by constitutional drafters to guide the inventory and choices of constitutional drafters.

=== Constitutional events ===
A first stage of the project has entailed the documentation, or census, of each historical constitutional "event" (e.g., replacement, amendment, suspension, etc.) for each of the countries included in the sample. This chronological dataset is published as the "Chronology of Constitutional Events." The sample includes every recognized independent state in the Ward and Gleditsch list (including most microstates) in existence for at least some period since 1789. This recording of events has been useful to researchers who study institutional reform historically, has become a standard accounting of the census of historical constitutions. Currently, the project lists the existence of 799 constitutional "systems" since 1789, 2,999 amendments to these 799 systems, 85 suspensions, 66 reinstated constitutions, and 95 interim constitutions. The project maintains a visualization of these chronologies.

=== Constitutional texts ===
The project's researchers have collected the text for nearly every system (in the year of its enactment) as well as most of the amendments to these systems. (They list a set of "most wanted" texts for those that they are missing.) They maintain an indexed repository of these texts on Constitute, an online tool that the researchers built with engineers at Google (see below).

=== Characteristics of constitutions ===
A central, component of the project is the coding of some 650 characteristics of constitutions (and their revisions, aggregated yearly). These data are disseminated in a dataset published yearly as the "Characteristics of National Constitutions." More than 200 studies have employed the data for the analysis of the origins and effects of constitutional choices, as well as a description of institutional forms over time. The authors have published several studies about the reliability and comparability of the data.

=== Related data ===
A number of data projects have spun off from the project's core sets of data. For example, some data projects have recorded information about the process of constitution making. Other researchers have deepened the topic coverage by coding topics in more detail. The project site maps some of these related data projects through a set of standardized topics (ontology), for which the team received a third grant from the National Science Foundation.

== Repository of texts (Constitute) ==
In 2013, CCP teamed up with Google Ideas (now Jigsaw) to launch Constitute, an indexed repository of currently-in-force constitutional texts. The point of Constitute is to provide representative text for each of 330 constitutional topics for constitutional drafters throughout the world. The site has been localized in Spanish and Arabic, which include a small number of texts translated into those languages. The site receives some 7,000 visitors a day and has won a number of awards for civic tech contributions and information design. Psycle Interactive, a digital production company based in the UK, has worked closely with the team since 2013.

=== Semantic web and controlled vocabularies ===
The data model for the site, which has evolved since 2013, represents one of the early uses of Semantic Web technology. A central focus of the project has been the articulation of a standardized vocabulary to track constitutional topics and to link various datasets on constitutions and politics.
