= Eiríkur Bergmann =

Icelandic academic and writer

Prof. Eiríkur Bergmann
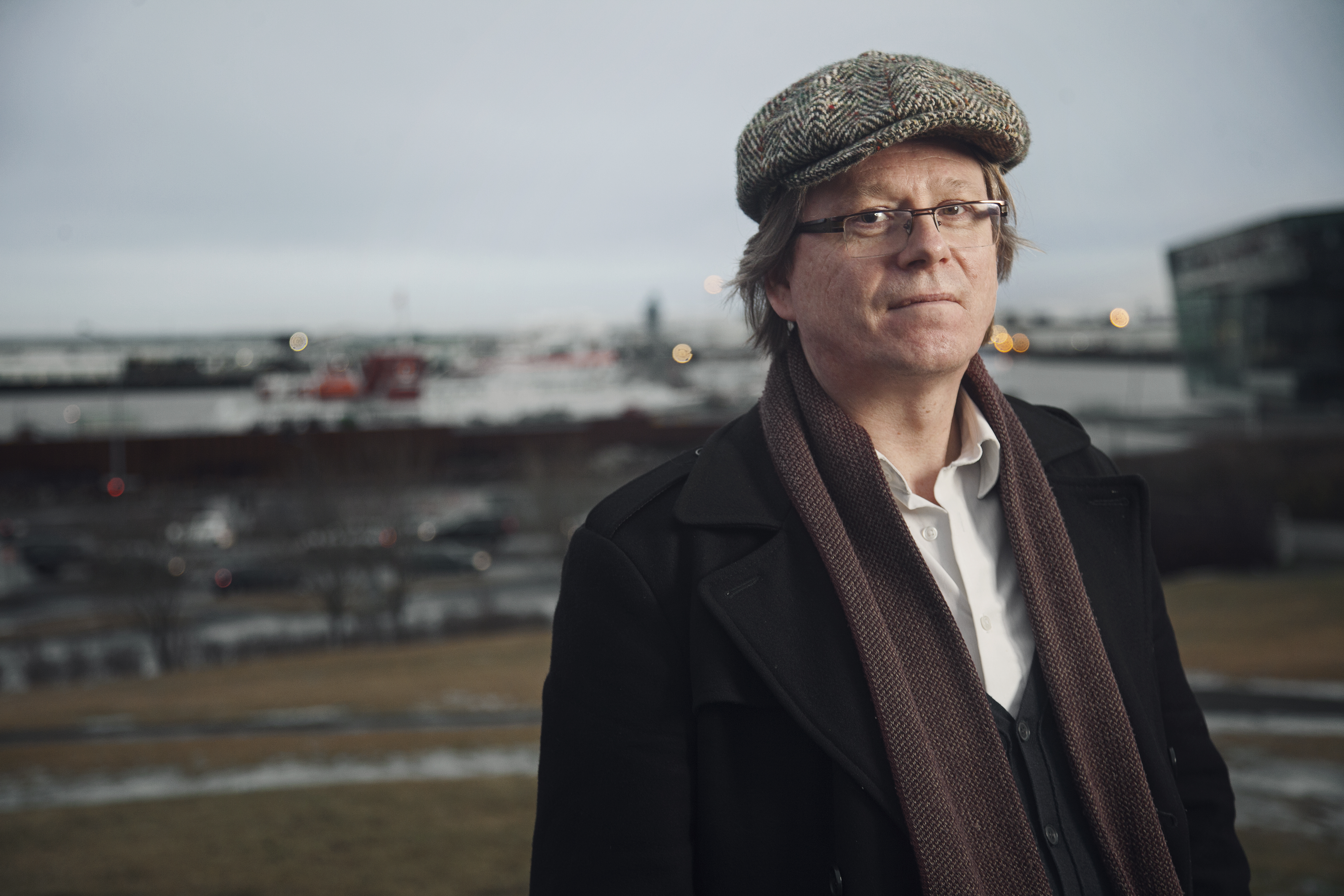
- Born: Eiríkur Bergmann Einarsson; 6 February 1969 (age 57); Reykjavík, Iceland
- Education: Copenhagen University / University of Iceland
- Occupation: Professor of Politics / Writer
- Notable work: Author of Neo-Nationalism
- Website: www.eirikurbergmann.com

Professor Eiríkur Bergmann Einarsson (born 6 February 1969) is an Icelandic academic and writer. He is author of ten academic books and three novels.

== Early life and education ==
Eirikur Bergmann was born in Reykjavík in 1969 and studied political science at the University of Iceland and Copenhagen University.

== Academics ==
Eirikur Bergmann is Professor of Politics and Director of the Centre for European Studies at Bifröst University. He was awarded Cand.Sci.Pol degree from Copenhagen University in 1998 and Ph.D. in Political Science from University of Iceland in 2009. Bergmann has been a visiting fellow at many academic institutions, including visiting professor in the Faculty of Social Science at the University of Ljubljana in Slovenia.

Bergmann is mainly known for his analysis of Nativist Populism, which he argues has turned into a distinctive form of Neo-nationalism in the post-Second World War era. He has also researched Conspiracy Theories, European Integration and Iceland's political economy, especially in relations to the Crash of 2008, its prelude and aftermath.

== Columnist ==
Eirikur Bergmann is also an active columnist. He has written for many newspapers in Iceland and for the British The Guardian.

== Constitutional Council ==
Bergmann was elected in 2010 to Iceland's Constitutional Assembly and subsequently served in 2011 as one of the 25 members of the Constitutional Council, part of the 2010–2013 reform of Iceland's constitution.

== Works ==
Bergmann has written widely on European politics, Icelandic politics, Nationalism, Populism and Conspiracy Theories. His books are as follows.

=== Academic books ===
- 2020: Neo-Nationalism: The Rise of Nativist Populism. London: Palgrave Macmillan. (235 p.)
- 2017: Nordic Nationalism and Right-Wing Populist Politics: Imperial Relationships and National Sentiments. London: Palgrave Macmillan. (217 p.)
- 2014: Iceland and the International Financial Crisis: Boom, Bust & Recovery. Basingstoke and New York: Palgrave Macmillan. [International Political Economy series]. (232 p.)
- 2011: Sjálfstæð þjóð – trylltur skríll og landráðalýður ('Independent nation'). [Study on national discourse in Icelandic politics]. Reykjavik: Veröld. (364 p.)
- 2009: Frá Evróvisjón til evru – allt um Evrópusambandið ('From Eurovision to the Euro: All about the European Union'). Reykjavik: Veröld. (262 p.)
- 2009: Sense of sovereignty – how national sentiments have influenced Iceland’s European policy [Ph.D. dissertation]. Reykjavik: Department of political science, University of Iceland. (370 p.)
- 2008: Hvað með evruna? ('How about the Euro?') [With Sturluson, Jon Thor]. Reykjavik: Bifrost University Press. (176 p.).
- 2007: Opið land – staða Íslands í samfélagi þjóðana ('Open land: Iceland’s place in the world society'). Reykjavík: Skrudda. 2007. (138 p.)
- 2003: Evrópusamruninn og Ísland ('European integration and Iceland'). Reykjavík: University of Iceland University Press. (203 p.)

=== Novels ===
Eirikur Bergmann has published three novels:

- Samsærið [The Plot] (in Icelandic). Sögur. 2017. ISBN 9789935479778.
- Hryðjuverkamaður snýr heim [A Terrorist Returns Home] (in Icelandic). Sögur útgáfa. 2015. ISBN 9789935448903.
- Glapræđi [Fool's Errand] (in Icelandic). Skrudda. 2005. ISBN 9789979772491.
