= Tom Ginsburg =

American lawyer (born 1967)

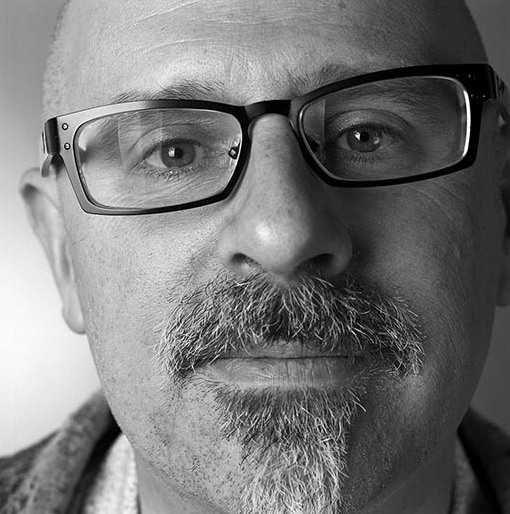
Tom Ginsburg, Chicago, 2015 Photograph by Kenneth Resnick.

Tom Ginsburg (born February 22, 1967) is an American political scientist and legal scholar. He is the Leo Spitz Distinguished Service Professor of International Law, Professor of Political Science and Faculty Director of the Malyi Center for the Study of Institutional and Legal Integrity and the Forum for Free Inquiry and Expression at the University of Chicago. He is an elected member of the American Academy of Arts and Sciences. He is primarily known as a scholar of international and comparative law, with a focus on constitutions and a regional specialty of East Asia.

== Biography ==
Ginsburg was born in Berkeley, California on February 22, 1967. He holds a B.A. in Asian Studies, a J.D., and a Ph.D in Jurisprudence and Social Policy from the University of California at Berkeley. He was a professor at the University of Illinois Urbana-Champaign College of Law from 2000 until 2008, when he joined the law faculty at Chicago.

== Professional work ==
Before entering law teaching at the University of Illinois in 2000, he served as a legal advisor to the Iran-US Claims Tribunal in the Hague, Netherlands as well as consulting for numerous international development agencies and foreign governments.

He has been a visiting professor at the University of Tokyo, Kyushu University, Seoul National University, the Interdisciplinary Center Herzliya, the University of Pennsylvania, and the University of Trento.

In addition to seven books, he has written a large number of journal and law review articles. With Zachary Elkins, he founded the Comparative Constitutions Project, which records the content of a complete set of national constitutions since 1789 and produces the website Constitute in partnership with Google Ideas.

Ginsburg is one of the most cited scholars of international law in the United States.

== Selected works ==
- How to Save a Constitutional Democracy (University of Chicago Press, 2018) (with Aziz Z. Huq)
- Judicial Reputation (University of Chicago Press, 2015) (with Nuno Garoupa)
- The Endurance Of National Constitutions (Cambridge University Press, 2009) (with Zachary Elkins and James Melton) Winner of Best Book Award from Comparative Democratization Section of the American Political Science Association
- Administrative Law And Governance In Asia: Comparative Perspectives (Routledge Press, 2009) (with Albert Chen)
- Rule By Law: The Politics Of Courts In Authoritarian Regimes (Cambridge University Press, 2008) (with Tamir Moustafa)
- Institutions And Public Law: Comparative Approaches (Peter Lang Publishing, 2005) (with Robert A. Kagan).
- Legal Reform In Korea (Routledge Publishing, 2004).
- Judicial Review In New Democracies: Constitutional Courts In East Asia (Cambridge University Press, 2003). Winner of the C. Herman Pritchett Award from the American Political Science Association for the best book on law and courts.
- The Multiple Worlds Of Japanese Law (University of Victoria Center for Asia Pacific Initiatives, 2001) (with Luke Nottage and Hiroo Sono).
