= Gylfi Zoega =

Icelandic economist (born 1963)

- Born: February 14, 1963; Iceland
- Education: Columbia University (M.A., '89, M.Phi., '91, Ph.D., '93); Islands University (B.A., '87)
- Scientific career
- Fields: Macroeconomics; Labour economics
- Workplaces: Birkbeck College, London
- Academic advisors: Edmund Phelps

Gylfi Zoega (born February 14, 1963) is an Icelandic economist who has gained prominence as an academic and active contributor to the economic policy debate in Iceland, especially during the 2008–2012 Icelandic financial crisis. He appears in the film Inside Job which uses the Icelandic financial crisis as a lead-in to its focus, the 2008 economic crisis in the United States and its origins.

== Education ==
Zoega received the Ph.D. degree in economics from Columbia University, New York, New York, USA in 1993 and the M.Phil. in 1991. Earlier he received the M.A. degree from the same university in 1989 and a B.A. degree in Economics and Business Administration from the University of Iceland in Reykjavík in 1987. Zoega specialises in macroeconomics and labour economics and has written numerous articles on the subject, including several co-authored with Nobel laureate Edmund Phelps.

== Career ==
Currently, a professor in Economics at Birkbeck College in London, Zoega is a member of the Monetary Policy Committee of the Central Bank of Iceland. Zoega has also taught at the University of Iceland and Columbia University.

== Public debate ==
Zoega has offered an assessment of the monetary policy during the upswing and reforms going forward. In addition to numerous basic reforms, a main conclusion is that the Central Bank should be granted macroprudential instruments to support the goal of price stability.
