= Saving Iceland =

Environmental organization

Saving Iceland is an organization that describe themselves as "a network of people of different nationalities, who do not intend to stand by passively and watch the Icelandic government in league with foreign corporations slowly kill the natural beauty of Iceland." They have been critical of the aluminum industry in Iceland.

Some of their protest tactics have included setting off alarms, distributing leaflets, chaining themselves to machinery, and throwing stink bombs. They have also used vandalism several times. Concerts to oppose heavy industry have also been organized by them.

In 2007, Saving Iceland began their "Summer of Dissent" campaign, which included a conference on “Global Consequences of Heavy Industry and Large Dams.”
