= 2012 Icelandic constitutional referendum =

Icelandic constitutional referendum
- 20 October 2012
- 1. Do you wish the Constitution Council's proposals to form the basis of a new draft Constitution?; 2. In the new Constitution, do you want natural resources that are not privately owned to be declared national property?; 3. Would you like to see provisions in the new Constitution on an established (national) church in Iceland?; 4. Would you like to see a provision in the new Constitution authorising the election of particular individuals to the Althing more than is the case at present?; 5. Would you like to see a provision in the new Constitution giving equal weight to votes cast in all parts of the country?; 6. Would you like to see a provision in the new Constitution stating that a certain proportion of the electorate is able to demand that issues are put to a referendum?

A non-binding constitutional referendum was held in Iceland on 20 October 2012. As a part of the 2010–2013 constitutional reform, and upon recommendation by the Constitutional Assembly, voters were asked whether they approved of six proposals included in a new draft constitution of Iceland. All six questions were approved by voters. The passing of Question 3 regarding the inclusion of a national church in the constitution was the only provision that went against the Constitutional Assembly's recommendations.

As of 2021, the changes had not been implemented, despite continued public support.

== Questions ==
The referendum consisted of six questions:

1. Do you wish the Constitution Council's proposals to form the basis of a new draft Constitution?
2. In the new Constitution, do you want natural resources that are not privately owned to be declared national property?
3. Would you like to see provisions in the new Constitution on an established (national) church in Iceland?
4. Would you like to see a provision in the new Constitution authorising the election of particular individuals to the Althing more than is the case at present?
5. Would you like to see a provision in the new Constitution giving equal weight to votes cast in all parts of the country?
6. Would you like to see a provision in the new Constitution stating that a certain proportion of the electorate is able to demand that issues are put to a referendum?

== Results ==
| Question | For | | Against | | No answer | Blank | Invalid | Total | Registered voters | Turnout |
| Question | Votes | % | Votes | % | No answer | Blank | Invalid | Total | Registered voters | Turnout |
|---|---|---|---|---|---|---|---|---|---|---|
| 1 | 73,509 | 66.9 | 36,302 | 33.1 | 4,759 | 661 | 659 | 115,890 | 236,850 | 48.9 |
| 2 | 84,760 | 82.9 | 17,470 | 17.1 | 12,340 | 661 | 659 | 115,890 | 236,850 | 48.9 |
| 3 | 58,455 | 57.1 | 43,914 | 42.9 | 12,201 | 661 | 659 | 115,890 | 236,850 | 48.9 |
| 4 | 78,451 | 78.4 | 21,660 | 21.6 | 14,459 | 661 | 659 | 115,890 | 236,850 | 48.9 |
| 5 | 66,653 | 66.5 | 33,590 | 33.5 | 14,327 | 661 | 659 | 115,890 | 236,850 | 48.9 |
| 6 | 72,633 | 73.3 | 26,440 | 26.7 | 15,497 | 661 | 659 | 115,890 | 236,850 | 48.9 |
Source: Statistics Iceland

All six questions were posed on a single ballot paper. The numbers for blank and invalid votes refer to votes that were either completely blank or completely invalid. "No answer" refers to votes that did not give an answer to that specific question.
