= Þorsteinn Gylfason =

Icelandic philosopher, translator, musician and poet

Þorsteinn Gylfason (12 August 1942 – 16 August 2005) was an Icelandic philosopher, translator, musician and poet. Þorsteinn distinguished himself in Icelandic public life with his writings in newspapers, journals and publications.

== His life and accomplishments ==
=== Early life ===
Þorsteinn was born and raised in Reykjavík, the capital of Iceland. His parents were Guðrún Vilmundardóttir and Gylfi Þorsteinsson Gíslason, a university professor and government minister. He was the brother of Vilmundur Gylfason, a politician, and Þorvaldur Gylfason, an economist.

Þorsteinn graduated from the Menntaskólinn í Reykjavík gymnasium in 1961 and subsequently received a grant to study at Harvard University. He left Harvard with a B.A. degree in philosophy, having studied under the tutelage of Willard Van Orman Quine. He returned home for graduate studies in Icelandic, and later attended LMU Munich and Magdalen College, Oxford from 1965 to 1971. At the University of Oxford, he studied under Gilbert Ryle and befriended well-known characters from philosophical circles, such as Alfred Jules Ayer. This influence affected his work in philosophy to a considerable extent.

=== Career ===
Þorsteinn worked as an assistant professor at the University of Iceland from 1971, and was made full professor in 1989. He was visiting professor at the Massachusetts Institute of Technology and the London School of Economics.

Þorsteinn received a number of awards and acknowledgements for his works, amongst them the Þórbergur Þórðarson and National Icelandic Literature Prizes in 1997. In 1994, he was awarded the Knights Cross of the Icelandic Falcon by Icelandic president Vigdís Finnbogadóttir for his contributions to Icelandic culture and academia.

=== Works ===
Þorsteinn wrote 12 books on philosophy and philology, including An Essay on Man (1970), An Essay on the World (1992), Thinking in Icelandic (1996) and Justice and Injustice (1998). He also published over 37 academic papers in various philosophical journals and composed poetry and lyrics, either with musical composer Atli Heimir Sveinsson or to the music of Kurt Weill and Richard Wagner.

His translations to Icelandic included On Liberty by John Stuart Mill, Søren Kierkegaard's Repetitions, Plato's Phaedo, Descartes' Meditations, all of whom were published by the Icelandic Literature Society, for which he served as a series chief editor for almost two decades.

=== Philosophy ===
Þorsteinn's philosophical work was mostly in the philosophy of language and mind and political philosophy. His method and style of philosophy was very much rooted in the analytic tradition, through influence from men such as W.V.O. Quine and Gilbert Ryle. He also found inspiration in the continental philosophers, especially from existentialism in the style of Søren Kierkegaard and Martin Heidegger, whose works he translated into Icelandic. Later on, his focus was on contemporary work by Elizabeth Anscombe, Donald Davidson, Saul Kripke, John Rawls, Philippa Foot, Charles Taylor and Richard Rorty.

Þorsteinn's early works (An Essay on Man in particular) are in the style of 20th century logical positivism—highly suspicious of esoteric Hegelian metaphysics. He later turned away from comprehensive theories to focus on specific problems. He considered himself an analytic philosopher insofar as "the ideas that have proven to be the most fruitful and inspiring, have been those of scholars generally considered to be 'analytic philosophers'." He usually said he was not much of a utilitarian neither in personal thinking nor politics and favoured deontology and virtue ethics.

His final words when describing himself as a philosopher were: "I believe that no philosophical theory can avoid paying the utmost heed to the natural sciences."

=== Death ===
Þorsteinn was diagnosed with terminal cancer of the stomach on 12 August 2005 and died four days later. His funeral took place in Reykjavík Cathedral.

== Publications ==
=== Books ===
- Tilraun um manninn [An Essay on Man], Reykjavík 1970.
- Þrætubókarkorn [Dialectic] (with P.T. Geach), Reykjavík, 1981.
- Tilraun um heiminn [An Essay on the World], Reykjavík 1992.
- Sprek af reka [Logs of Driftwood], Reykjavík 1993 (translations of verse).
- Að hugsa á íslenzku [Thinking in Icelandic], Reykjavík 1996 (collected essays on the philosophy of language).
- Réttlæti og ranglæti [Justice and Injustice], Reykjavík 1998 (collected essays on political philosophy).
- Söngfugl að sunnan [A Songbird from the South], Reykjavik 2000 (translations of verse).
- Sál og mál [Mind and Language], Reykjavík 2006 (collected essays in Icelandic and English published posthumously).

=== Booklets ===
- Rauður fyrirlestur [A Red Lecture], Reykjavík 1982 (against libertarianism).
- Valdsorðaskak [A Disputation on Power], Reykjavík 1982.
- Orðasmíð [The Creativity of Language], Reykjavík 1991 (inaugural lecture).
- Niflungahringurinn [Der Ring des Nibelungen], Listahátíð í Reykjavík 1994. See Works for the Stage (1).
- Gagnrýni hreinnar skynsemi [Pure Reason Criticised], Reykjavík 1994 (on Kant). (Revised as Náin skoðun skynseminnar, Reykjavík 2001).

=== Principal essays in books or periodicals ===
- “Skemmtilegt er myrkrið” [The Fun of Darkness], Tímarit Máls og menningar 1971, 285-313 (against dialectical materialism).
- “Að hugsa á íslenzku” [Thinking in Icelandic], Skírnir 1973, 129-158 (also published as a booklet).
- “Ætti sálarfræði að vera til?” [Should There Be Psychology?] Skírnir 1975, 5-37.
- “Er vit í vísindum?” [Is Science Rational?], Tímarit Máls og menningar 1975, 245-266 (on Kuhn versus Popper).
- “Um fyrirburðafræði” [On Parapsychology], Lífgeislar 1979, 3-34 and 61–66.
- “Hvers vegna í dauðanum?” [Why on Earth?], Morgunblaðið 12 April 1980 (on the psychology of education).
- “Málrækt í mannlegum fræðum” [Linguistic Purism in the Humanities], Skíma IV, 3 (1981).
- “Hvað er réttlæti?” [What is Justice?], Skírnir 1984, 159–222.
- “Teikn og tákn” [Signs and Symbols], Stúdentablaðið LXI, 4, 17–19.
- “Tónlist, réttlæti og sannleikur” [Music, Justice and Truth], Andvari 1985, 127-142 (on the aesthetics of music).
- “Sur des parlers anciens, faisons des mots nouveaux” [New Words for an Old Language], Diogène 1985, 19-36 (on neology). Also published in English, Spanish and Chinese.
- “Inngangur” [Introduction] to Sigurður Nordal: Einlyndi og marglyndi [Unity and Diversity], Reykjavík 1986, ix-xxxvii.
- “Hundrað og eitt ár” [101 Years], Tímarit Máls og menningar 1989, 304-318 (a centenary celebration of the writer Þórbergur Þórðarson).
- “Ludwig Wittgenstein”, Hugur 1989, 5-22 (a centenary celebration).
- “Martin Heidegger”, Teningur 1989 (a centenary celebration).
- “Snilld og brjálæði” [Genius and Madness], Tímaritið 2000 1990.
- “Ljósið sem hvarf” [The Light that Vanished], Skírnir 1990, 362-389 (on the philosophy of religion).
- “Det kreativa ordet” [The Creative Word] in Georg Klein (ed.): Om kreativitet och flow [On Creativity and Flow], Stockholm 1990.
- “Skáldskapur og sannleikur” [Poetry and Truth], Teningur 1991, 24–27.
- “Anaxímandros frá Míletos” [Anaximander of Miletus], Tímarit Máls og menningar 1991, 75–91.
- “Inngangur” [Introduction] and “Skýringar” [Notes] to René Descartes: Orðræða um aðferð [Discourse on Method], Reykjavík 1991, 11-54 and 153–202.
- “Líf og sál” [Life and Soul] in Einar Logi Vignisson og Ólafur Páll Jónsson (eds.): Af líkama og sál [Of Body and Mind], Reykjavík 1992.
- “Að gera eða vera” [To Do or to Be] in Hugur Vol. 6 (1993–1994), 63–90.
- “Skólar, úhrif og þroski” (Schools, External Effects and Human Development] in Ný menntamál Vol. 12 No. 4. (1994), 6–11.
- “Er tónlist mál?” [Is Music a Language?] Tímarit Máls og menningar 1994.
- “Gildi, boð og ástæður” [Values, Imperatives and Reasons] in Hugur Vol. 6 (1995), 14–31.
- “SDG” [Soli Deo Gloria] in Þorsteinn Helgason (ed.): Sem niður margra vatna: Sumartónleikar í Skálholtskirkju tuttugu ára, Reykjavík 1995, 29-33 (on Bach's theology)
- “Fjölræði og sjálfstæði” [Pluralism and Independence] in Tímarit lögfræðinga 1995, 1-15 (on the independence of the judiciary).
- “Richard Wagner as a Poet” in Wagner's Ring and Its Icelandic Sources, edited by Úlfar Bragason, Stofnun Sigurðar Nordals, Reykjavík 1995.
- “Túlkun og tjáning” [Interpretation and Expression] in Leikhúsmál 1996 (on dramatic acting).
- “Sannleikur” [Truth] in Er vit í vísindum?, Reykjavík 1996.
- “Kan DNA-koden och binas dans betraktas som språk?” (Can the DNA-code and the Dance of Bees be regarded as languages?) in Medicinsk vetenskap vid Karolinska Institutet No. 4 1997.
- “Introduction” to Njál's Saga, Wordsworth Classics of World Literarture, 1998.
- “Inngangur” [Introduction] to Ludwig Wittgenstein's Bláa bókin [The Blue Book], Reykjavík 1998.
- “Er eignarréttur náttúrlegur?” in Afmælisrit: Þór Vilhjálmsson sjötugur, Orator, Reykjavík 2000.
- “Inngangur” [Introduction] to René Descartes: Hugleiðingar um frumspeki [Meditations], Reykjavík 2001.
- “Refir, broddgeltir, dýrlingur og snákur“ [on G.E.M. Anscombe and W.V.O. Quine] in Hugur, Reykjavík 2002.

=== Principal poems in periodicals and anthologies ===
- “Glerhús við skál” [Clerihews Above a Glass], Morgunblaðið 1985.
- “Ólafur Jónsson”, Lesbók Morgunblaðsins 1989.
- “Hamingjan um nótt” [Happiness at Night], Tímarit Máls og menningar 1990 and Spegill, spegill, Reykjavik 1991 (an anthology of literature for secondary schools).
- “Vilmundur Gylfason”, Tímarit Máls og menningar 1990.
- “Ættjarðarkvæði” [A Patriotic Song], Morgunblaðið 1991.
- “Töfraflautan” [The Magic Flute], Leikskrá Íslensku óperunnar 1991 and Morgunblaðið 1991.
- “Sónhenda með ensku sniði” [A Sonnet in the English Manner], Vörður 1993.
- “Skírnarsálmur Alexöndru” [Alexandra's Baptismal Hymn], Lesbók Morgunblaðsins 1995.
- “Draugar í bænum á miðvikudagsmorgni” [Ghosts in Town on a Wednesday Morning],
- "Gegnum jarðgöng tímans" [Through The Tunnel of Time], Reykjavík 1998.

=== Works for the stage ===
- Richard Wagner: Niflungahringurinn [The Ring of the Nibelung]. (A verse translation of selections from Wagner's text with spoken interludes for two actors, performed at the National Theatre of Iceland and printed 1994).
- Jónas í hvalnum [Jonah in the Whale] 1995. (An oratorio with music by Atli Heimir Sveinsson. The music is not yet completed).
- Til hinna óbornu [An die Nachgeborenen, To Those Who Come After]. (A cabaret of songs by Kurt Weill, Hanns Eisler and Paul Dessau to Bertolt Brecht's poems with spoken interludes, performed October 1998.)
- Kristnitaka á Íslandi [The Conversion of Iceland] 1999. (A grand opera in two acts, with music by Atli Heimir Sveinsson, commissioned for the 1000th anniversary of Christianity in Iceland in 2000. Performed at the Icelandic Opera in April 2001.)

=== Main translations into Icelandic ===
- Søren Kierkegaard: Repetition (Helgafell, Reykjavík 1966). New edition: Hið íslenzka bókmenntafélag, Reykjavík 2000.
- J.S. Mill: On Liberty (co-translator, 1970).
- Plato: Phaedo (1972) (in Síðustu dagar Sókratesar).
- René Descartes: Meditations, Hið íslenzka bókmenntafélag, Reykjavík 2001.
- Albert Giraud: Pierrot Lunaire, to music by Schönberg (1980). Reprinted in Sprek af reka 1993.
- Emanuel Schikaneder: The Magic Flute, to music by Mozart (co-translator, performed 1983–1984 and 1991–1992).
- Martin Heidegger: Aus der Erfahrung des Denkens (1989).
- P.I. Tchaikovsky and K. Shilovsky (after A. Pushkin): Eugene Onegin, to music by Tchaikovsky (performed and printed 1993–1994).
- Søren Kierkegaard: "Ómar af strengleikum" [Selections from the Diapsalmata in Either-Or], Jón á Bægisá I, 1994.
- Engelbert Humperdinck: Hans og Gréta [Hänsel und Gretel], performed 1996.
- Franz Lehár: Káta ekkjan [Die lustige Witwe], performed 1997.
- Verse by Lucretius, J.W. v. Goethe, Robert Burns, A.O. Vinje, Gabriele d'Annunzio, Stefan George, Rainer Maria Rilke, Bertolt Brecht, W.B. Yeats, T.S. Eliot, W.H. Auden and others, published in periodicals. Collected together with much previously unpublished material in Sprek af reka 1993.
