= Vilmundur Gylfason =

Icelandic politician (1948–1983)

Minister of Justice, Religion and Education
- In office 15 October 1979 – 8 February 1980
- Prime Minister: Benedikt Gröndal
- Preceded by: Ragnar Arnalds
- Succeeded by: Ingvar Gíslason

Personal details
- Born: 7 August 1948 Reykjavík, Iceland
- Died: 19 June 1983 (aged 34) Reykjavík, Iceland
- Party: Alliance of Social Democrats (After 1983); Social Democratic Party (Before 1982)

Vilmundur Gylfason (7 August 1948 – 19 June 1983) was an Icelandic politician, historian and poet. He was the son of Gylfi Þorsteinsson Gíslason and Guðrún Vilmundardóttir.

== Family ==
Vilmundur's father was Gylfi Þorsteinsson Gíslason, a member of parliament, government minister and professor. His mother, Guðrún Vilmundardóttir, was a housewife and worked as a journalist for some time.

Vilmundur had two brothers, Þorsteinn Gylfason the philosopher, and Þorvaldur Gylfason, an economist.

Vilmundur was married to Valgerður Bjarnadóttir, daughter of Bjarni Benediktsson.

== Life and work ==
Vilmundur studied at Menntaskólinn í Reykjavík, an Icelandic Junior College, from 1964 to 1968. He was editor of the student paper, served as inspector scholae for a year and was an active participant in student life. He graduated with an emphasis on languages. Upon graduation, he studied in England and in 1971 he finished a BA Degree in literature and history at the University of Manchester. In 1973 he finished an MA degree in the same subjects at University of Exeter.When he returned to Iceland in 1973, he received a job as a teacher of history at Menntaskólinn í Reykjavík and wrote articles in the Icelandic newspapers. He taught at MR until his death.

Vilmundur was active in setting up radio programs on arts and culture, was a major participant in starting the Helgarpósturinn newspaper, and founded and served as editor of Nýtt land. He also published two poetry books, Myndir og ljóðbrot (1970) and Ljóð (1980).

Vilmundur and his wife lost their son in a fire at a government summer house at Þingvellir on 10 July 1970, where he had been residing with his grandparents prime minister Bjarni Benediktsson and wife who also perished in the blaze. Vilmundur killed himself on 19 June 1983.

== Politics ==
Vilmundur's political opinions were very much shaped by his stay in England, and were decidedly left-wing.

In the Icelandic parliament elections of 1971, Vilmundur stood as candidate for Social Democratic Party in the Westfjords constituency. He was an active participant in the operations of the party and held a number of positions within it. He was the editor of Alþýðublaðið, the party newspaper, for a year. In the 1978 elections Vilmundur was a candidate in Reykjavík and was voted into office. From October 1979 to February 1980 he served as Minister of Justice, Religion and Education in the minority Social Democratic government.

In 1982, Vilmundur left the Social Democrats and founded the Alliance of Social Democrats in 1983. The party won four seats in the elections that year.

== Sources ==
- Morgunblaðið, 21. Júní 1983, bls. 46.
- Morgunblaðið, 28. Júní 1983, bls. 14, 15, 35, 36.
- Biography on the Alþingi website
