= Freyja Haraldsdóttir =

Icelandic politician

Member of the Althing
- In office 2013–2015
- Constituency: Southwest

Personal details
- Born: 27 June 1986 (age 39) Reykjavík, Iceland
- Party: Bright Future

Freyja Haraldsdóttir (born 27 June 1986) is an Icelandic politician and a disability rights activist. She was elected to the Icelandic Constitutional Assembly in 2010 and chosen to become a deputy Member of Parliament of the Althing in 2013.

== Early life and education ==
Freyja was born on 27 June 1986 in Reykjavík, Iceland with osteogenesis imperfecta. In 1997, Haraldsdóttir and her family moved to Nelson, New Zealand where she went to school in the neighbouring town of Richmond. Freyja graduated from the University of Iceland with a Bachelor of Arts in social pedagogy. She continued her studies at the University of Iceland by completing a gender studies thesis for a Master of Arts degree.

== Career ==
Before going into politics, Freyja was an advocate in support of providing people with disabilities with personal assistants. She was convinced to enter politics after meeting with former Bright Future party member Gudmundur Steingrimsson who was leading a committee that aligned with her career. In 2010, Freyja was elected to the Icelandic Constitutional Assembly. During her term, she was selected to become Steingrimsson's deputy Member of Parliament for the Althing in 2013. Her tenure of vice president for Southwest Constituency lasted from 2013 until 2015. Outside of her political career, Freyja worked at Independent Living Centre from 2010 to 2014 as a director. After leaving the ILC, she co-founded the company Tabú whose goal is to create safe spaces for women with disabilities in Iceland. In 2018, after her political career ended, she was subject to insults and reportedly "seal noises" by Members of Parliament who were recorded in a bar.
