= Guðmundur Gunnarsson =

Icelandic electrician (born 1945)

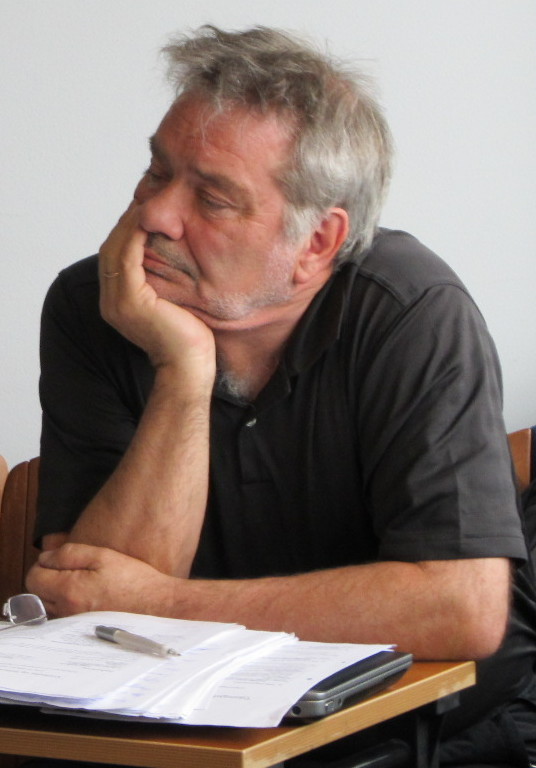
- Guðmundur in 2011
- Born: 29 October 1945 (age 80); Reykjavík, Iceland
- Occupation: Electrician
- Spouse: Hildur Rúna Hauksdóttir (div. 1967)
- Children: Björk

Guðmundur Gunnarsson (born 29 October 1945) is an Icelandic electrician who served as the leader of the Icelandic Electricians' Union, Rafiðnaðarsamband Íslands (RSÍ) from 1993 until 2011.

== Biography ==
Guðmundur Gunnarsson is the father of the singer Björk. At the awards ceremony where Björk won the Polar Music Prize in 2010, Guðmundur noted, "her musical talent came even before she started talking."

Guðmundur's parents were Gunnar Guðmundsson and Hallfríður Guðmundsdóttir. He qualified as a journeyman electrician in 1966 and graduated from the Technical College of Iceland in 1969.

He was a municipal representative of the Sjálfstæðisflokkurinn (Independence Party) in Reykjavík from 1994 to 1998 and Chairman of the Nordic Federation of Electricians' Unions from 1994 to 1996 and from 2004 to 2006. Additionally, he has authored numerous textbooks for electricians.
