= Constitution of Iceland =

National democratic constitution

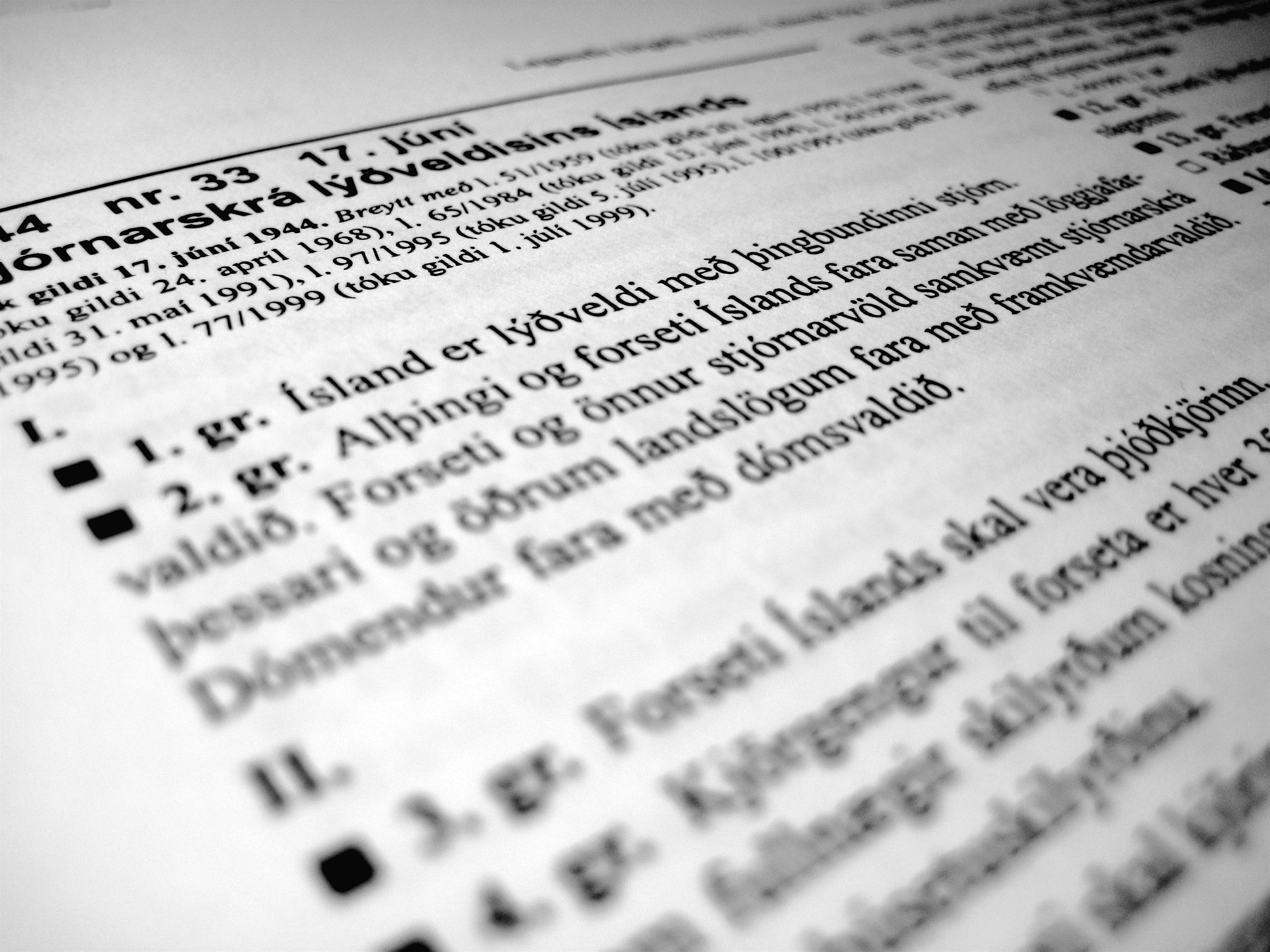
The constitution of Iceland in close-up

The Constitution of Iceland (Icelandic: Stjórnarskrá lýðveldisins Íslands "Constitution of the republic of Iceland") is the supreme law of Iceland. It is composed of 80 articles in seven sections, and within it the leadership arrangement of the country is determined and the human rights of its citizens are preserved. The current constitution was first instituted on 17 June 1944 when Iceland became a republic; since then, it has been amended seven times.

== History ==
In the 19th century, the Icelandic independence movement from Denmark was gaining momentum, while nationalism and demands for increased civil rights intensified in mainland Europe. In June 1849, the king of Denmark was forced to meet the demands of the liberals and the nationalists, and agree to a constitution for Denmark and thus also with Iceland. This constitution repealed the absolute monarchy and established a constitutional monarchy in which power over most important issues was handed over to a parliament elected by the people.

This change was not well-received with Icelanders, as it in reality translated to reduced autonomy for Iceland. Before 1849, Icelanders had officially ruled themselves as they happened to see fit in domestic matters. But now those matters were falling under the control of parliaments over which Icelanders had no influence. The Danes were reluctant to meet the demands of Icelanders for self-government as set forth during the National Assembly of 1851, in the belief that it would weaken Denmark's control in Schleswig and Holstein. But when said region was annexed by Prussia in 1867, new conditions were created and stöðulögin ("the laws of standing") were passed 1871, which determined the standing of Iceland in relation to the Danish state. In 1874, on the millennial anniversary of the settlement in Iceland, Christian IX became king of Denmark and attended the festivities of the watershed occasion. This opportunity was used to give Iceland its own separate constitution. This constitution was called Stjórnarskrá um hin sérstaklegu málefni Íslands, and was the basis of Iceland's current constitution.

With the sambandslögin ("relationship law") of 1918, Iceland became a sovereign state and in 1920 the country received a new constitution to reflect this large change. This constitution was called Stjórnarskrá konungsríkisins Íslands. In early 1944 the Althing approved the cancellation of the sambandslögin and agreed to a new constitution, in addition to proclaiming a referendum to both. An election was run in May of the same year and had a turnout of 98%. 97% voted to break off the current relationship law with Denmark and 95% approved a constitutional republic. On 17 June 1944 the Althing met at Þingvellir, where the constitution was ratified and the republic established.

After the ratification of the constitution, it has been amended seven times in total, mostly due to changes in the structure of the constituencies of Iceland and the conditions of voting eligibility. In 1991 the organization of Althing changed so that it now worked in one house rather than two as previously before. Extensive modifications were made in 1995 when the human rights sections of the constitution were reviewed.

== Sections of the Constitution ==
=== Section I. ===
Section I states that Iceland is a Republic with a parliamentary government, and the Althing and the president jointly exercise legislative power and judges exercise judicial power.

=== Section II. ===
Section II contains articles 3 through 30, and states where the Presidential Seat is, meetings with the Althingi, and presidential rights.

=== Section III. ===
Section III contains articles 31–34, and defines term limits for Althingi members, and that any citizen of Iceland can be elected to the Althingi, except for Supreme Court Judges.

=== Section IV. ===
Section IV contains articles 35–58, and defines the major issues concerning the activity of the parliament and determines the rights and power of the MPs. The section says that nobody is allowed to approve a bill before three readings in the Althing, and Althing meetings shall take place in public unless otherwise approved by the Parliament. The majority of MPs must be present to deal with an issue. Many other parliamentary procedural rules are legally defined according to the 58th article.

=== Section V. ===
Section V contains articles 59–61, and describes the regulation of judiciary. It says that the judiciary may be established by law, that the judiciary will settle disputes around competence of authorities, and that the judiciary shall be guided solely by law.

=== Section VI. ===
Section VI contains articles 62–64, and sets the Evangelical Lutheran Church as the State Church and establishes freedom of religion.

=== Section VII. ===
Section VII contains articles number 65-79, and defines several human rights (including disallowing torture, forced labor, and the death penalty, requiring a public trial for anybody accused of a crime, and freedom of speech). It also says that the law shall provide that everybody has a right to health care and education. It says that matters according to taxes are regulated by law, and municipalities may manage their own affairs in accordance to the law. Finally, it gives provisions for amending the constitution.

== Amendments to the Constitution ==
The 79th Article of the Constitution describes how to enact amendments to the constitution. In order for an amendment to be passed, it must be approved by two consecutive parliamentary assemblies, with a general election in between. The president of Iceland must also confirm any amendment as provided by general law. Several articles in the constitution, however, are exempt from this process and can be changed by ordinary legislation. For example, the 35th article deals with the assembly time of Parliament, and this may be changed by general law. The 62nd article defines the State Church to be the Evangelical Lutheran Church. This may also be changed by general law, provided it is confirmed by a referendum available by secret ballot to all those able to vote.

== Constitutional reform (2010–2013) ==
Between 2010 and 2013, in the wake of the Kitchenware Revolution, Iceland's constitution was proposed to be revised through the world's first crowd-sourced constitution. On 20 October 2012 an advisory referendum secured the support of 64.2% of the Icelandic citizens. However, the constitutional reform had not been implemented as of 2024, despite continued public support.
