= Katarzyna Gardapkhadze =

Polish former civil servant

Katarzyna Gardapkhadze (Jarosiewicz-Wargan)

OSCE Office for Democratic Institutions and Human Rights
- Director’s Alternate
- In office 2020–2020
- Preceded by: Ingibjörg Sólrún Gísladóttir
- Succeeded by: Matteo Mecacci

OSCE Office for Democratic Institutions and Human Rights First Deputy Director
- In office September 2016 – 30 June 2021

OSCE Office for Democratic Institutions and Human Rights Head of Human Rights Department
- In office September 2016 – May 2015

OSCE Office for Democratic Institutions and Human Rights Acting Co-ordinator, Ukraine Civil Society Project
- In office November 2014 – May 2015

OSCE Office for Democratic Institutions and Human Rights Project Development, Monitoring & Evaluation
- In office August 2011 – November 2014

OSCE Office for Democratic Institutions and Human Rights Program Development, Fundraising and Monitoring Consultant
- In office September 2010 – April 2011

Personal details
- Citizenship: Poland
- Education: University of Gdansk, George Washington University
- Awards: Ambassador for Liberty and Peace International Award of Excellence
- Website: https://responsibleleadership.eu/

Katarzyna Gardapkhadze - current CEO of the Responsible Leadership Academy and a former First Deputy Director of the OSCE's Office for Democratic Institutions and Human Rights (ODHIR), in the post from September 2016 until 30 June 2021. In 2020, during a period without a politically appointed Director, she served as ODIHR's Director's Alternate.

Educated psychologist, she is an expert in leadership, strategic management and organizational development. Katarzyna shared her professional experience and knowledge and contributed as expert to numerous international and national conferences across the OSCE region, speaking on various aspects of human rights, tolerance and non-discrimination, democracy and rule of law. She is committed to responsible leadership and sustainable impact.

== Education ==
In 1990 - 1994, she studied psychology (master's degree studies) at the University of Gdańsk. In 1998 - 1999, she continued her education in psychology at the George Washington University (non-degree studies).

Katarzyna is a graduate of Stanford Leadership Academy for Development, and a trainer certified from the Institute for Leadership & Management.

She is fluent in Polish (native), English, Russian and Georgian languages.

== Professional career ==
Katarzyna has over 25 years of experience in public service, international non-profits and multilateral organizations mostly in Europe and North America, but also in South Caucasus and Central Asia. Before joining the OSCE, she served as a director of Save the Children child protection programme, based in Tbilisi, Georgia. Prior to that, she worked as an evaluator for Eurasia Foundation’s South Caucasus media support programme, led a USAID-funded Georgia youth peace project, and was a consultant trainer for the United Nations Mission in Kosovo community strengthening work. She also managed initiatives focused on human rights, minorities and inter-ethnic dialogue in Western Balkans (2000 – 2002).

She participated in international election observation as a short-term observer (ODIHR election observation in Bosnia and Herzegovina and in Kosovo, 2000).

At ODIHR, Katarzyna oversees the Office's programmatic work on elections, democratization, human rights, tolerance and non-discrimination, and Roma and Sinti programmes.

== Awards ==
In 2019, Katarzyna Gardapkhadze received the Ambassador for Liberty and Peace International Award of Excellence in recognition of her leadership and dedication while working for ODIHR.

== Publications ==
- K. Wargan, L. Dershem Don't call me a street child. Estimation and characteristics of urban street children in Georgia (2009)
- K. Gardapkhadze, G. Davies "How Multilateral Organisations can Communicate Better about Human Rights"., in: European Yearbook on Human Rights 2018, doi:10.1017/9781780688008.022
- K. Gardapkhadze "On International Organisations and Responsible Leadership: A Snake Eating its Own Tail (Opinion)", in: European Yearbook on Human Rights 2020 doi:10.1017/9781839701139.003
