= Röskva (University of Iceland) =

- Student organization
- Röskva_vektor.png Röska logo

Founded: 1988

President: Ármann Leifsson

Vice President: Fjóla María Sigurðardóttir

Leader in the Council: Kristmundur Pétursson

Röskva is a student body organization at the University of Iceland that has had a list to the Student Council of the UI since 1988. The tag-line of the organization is Organization of socially minded students at the University of Iceland. Röskva is currently in majority of the Student Council.

Röskva nominates to the paid positions at the Student Council's Office.

== History ==
Röskva was founded in February the year 1988 when two movements merged, The organization of left people and Reformists decided that combined they would be a bigger force to compete against Vaka, the organization of democratic students. The first chair of the organization was Þórunn Sveinbjarnardóttir the former Environment minister in the government of Geir Haarde. Röskva first was in the majority in 1992 and kept it until 2002, when Vaka regained its majority. Röskva got the majority again in the spring of 2007 and kept it until the spring of 2009.

In 2017, Röskva won the election to the Student Council after eight years in minority, and received 18 of the 27 student councils members, which was at the time the biggest victory in Röskva's history. Röskva managed to hold on to its majority and in 2019 Röskva won for the first time a majority in all of the five schools within the university. In the Student Council elections of 2020 Röskva received 13 of 17 student council members, which was at the time their biggest victory. Röskva's biggest victory came in 2021 where they won 16 of 17 seats available.

The organization opposes school admission fees and advocates for general access to university education. It is Röskva's opinion that the Student Council should not only exert itself within the University of Iceland but outside of it as well.

== Chair of the Student Council for Röskva ==
- 1991-1992 – Steinunn Valdís Óskarsdóttir
- 1992-1993 – Pétur Þ. Óskarsson
- 1993-1994 – Páll Magnússon
- 1994-1995 – Dagur B. Eggertsson
- 1995-1996 – Guðmundur Steingrímsson
- 1996-1997 – Vilhjálmur H. Vilhjálmsson
- 1997-1998 – Haraldur Guðni Eiðsson
- 1998-1999 – Ásdís Magnúsdóttir
- 1999-2000 – Finnur Beck
- 2000-2001 – Eiríkur Jónsson
- 2001-2002 – Þorvarður Tjörvi Ólafsson
- 2007-2008 – Dagný Ósk Aradóttir
- 2008-2009 – Björg Magnúsdóttir
- 2017-2018 – Ragna Sigurðardóttir
- 2018-2019 – Elísabet Brynjarsdóttir
- 2019-2020 – Jóna Þórey Pétursdóttir
- 2020-2021 – Isabel Alejandra Diaz
- 2021-2022 – Isabel Alejandra Diaz
- 2022-2023 – Rebekka Karlsdóttir
- 2023-2024 – Rakel Anna Boulter
