= Office for Democratic Institutions and Human Rights =

International organization based in Warsaw, Poland

Office for Democratic Institutions and Human Rights (ODIHR)

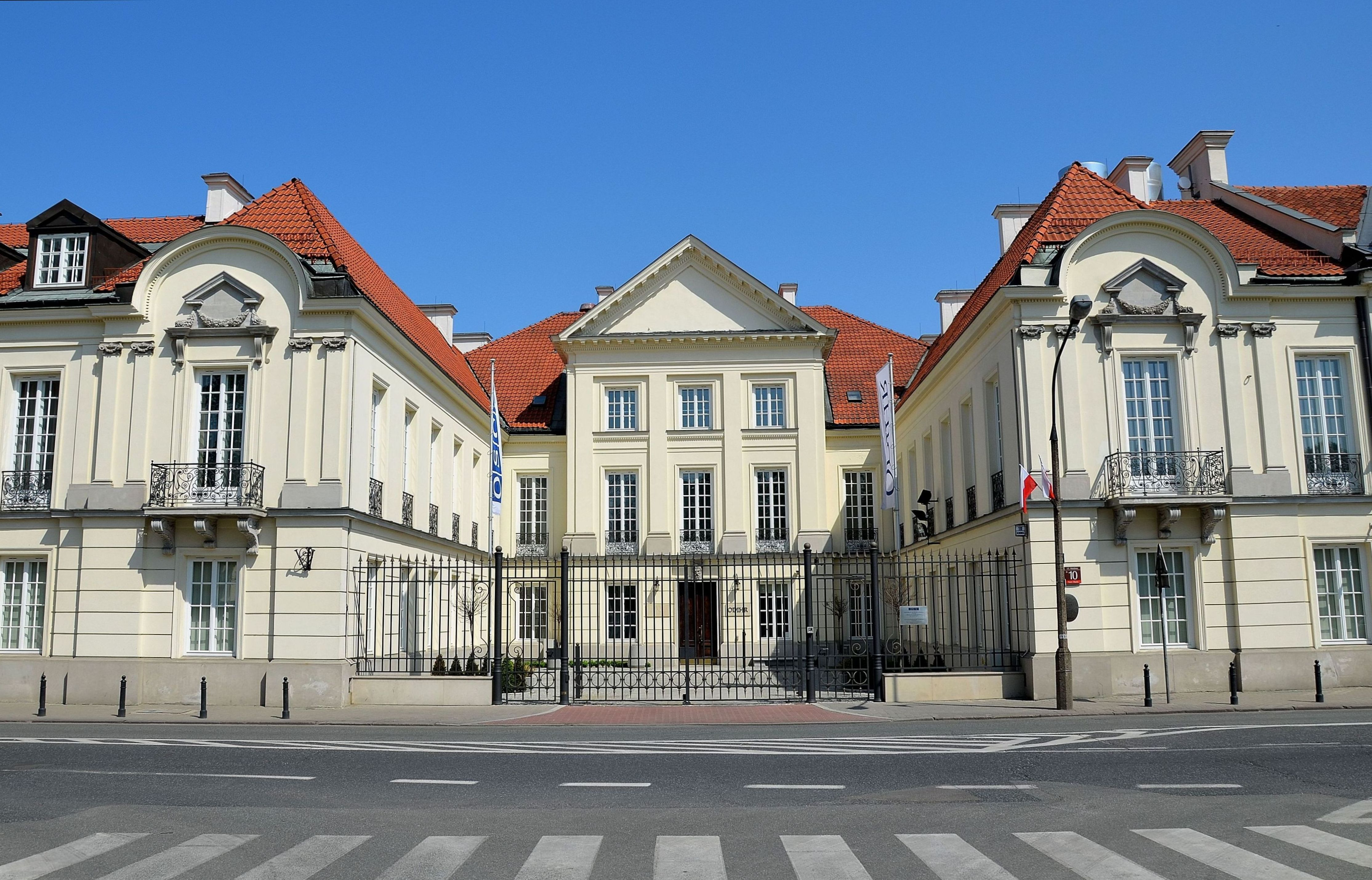
- Młodziejowski Palace in Warsaw, the seat of ODIHR

Office overview
- Formed: 1990
- Jurisdiction: Organization for Security and Co-operation in Europe
- Headquarters: Warsaw, Poland
- Employees: 180
- Office executive: (Greece) Maria Telalian, Director
- Website: www.osce.org/odihr/

Map
- Office for Democratic Institutions and Human Rights (Europe)

The Office for Democratic Institutions and Human Rights (ODIHR) is the principal institution of the Organization for Security and Cooperation in Europe (OSCE) dealing with the "human dimension" of security. The Office, originally established in 1991 under the 1990 Paris Charter as the Office for Free Elections, is still best known for its role in observing elections although its name changed in 1992 to reflect the broadening of its role by the Helsinki Summit.

Based in Warsaw, Poland, ODIHR is active throughout the 57 participating States of the OSCE. It assists governments in meeting their commitments as participating States of the OSCE in the areas of elections, human rights, democracy, rule of law, and tolerance and non-discrimination. The Office also hosts the organization's Contact Point for Roma and Sinti Issues.

On 4 December 2020, Matteo Mecacci of Italy received a nomination for the position of ODIHR's Director.

In 2021 the Office had a budget of €16 million and employed 146 people, of which a supermajority were women.

On 3 September 2024, Tea Jaliashvili was entrusted with ensuring the uninterrupted implementation of ODIHR's mandate.

In 2024, ODIHR was included in the unofficial list of five possible candidates for the Nobel Peace Prize issued annually by the Peace Research Institute Oslo (PRIO).

== ODIHR activities ==
Since its establishment, ODIHR has deployed more than 470 election observation missions across the OSCE region.

The Office organizes the annual OSCE Human Dimension Implementation Meeting in Warsaw, Europe's largest human rights conference.

=== ODIHR international electoral observer activities ===
- During the United States elections, 2012—following media reports that tied ODIHR international electoral observers to the United Nations and accused them of having plans to interfere in the election—the observers, who said they were in the United States to review several benchmarks of democratic elections, were blocked from polls in nine of the 50 states—Alabama, Alaska, Florida, Iowa, Michigan, Mississippi, Ohio, Pennsylvania, and Texas.

== ODIHR Directors ==
ODIHR Directors
| Photo | Name and Surname | OSCE participating State | Mandate |
|---|---|---|---|
| | Luchino Cortese | Italy | 1991–1994 |
| | Dame Audrey Glover | United Kingdom | 1994–1997 |
| | Gérard Stoudmann | Switzerland | 1997–2003 |
| | Christian Strohal | Austria | 2003–2008 |
| Janez Lenarčič | Janez Lenarčič | Slovenia | 2008–2014 |
| Michael Georg Link | Michael Georg Link | Germany | 2014–2017 |
| Ingibjörg Sólrún Gísladóttir (2007) | Ingibjörg Sólrún Gísladóttir | Iceland | 2017–2020 |
| | Katarzyna Gardapkhadze – Alternate Director | Poland | 2020 |
| Matteo Mecacci | Matteo Mecacci | Italy | 2020–2024 |
| | Tea Jaliashvili – Alternate Director | (Georgia (country)) Georgia | 2024 |
| Maria Telalian | Maria Telalian | Greece | 2024–present |

== See also ==
- List of human rights organizations
- Tatiana Kotlyarenko
