= Mayor of Reykjavík =

- Borgarstjóri Reykjavíkur
- Municipal coat of arms
- Incumbent; Hildur Björnsdóttir since 2 June 2026
- Reykjavík City Council
- Seat: Reykjavík
- Term length: Four years (renewable indefinitely with the support of the Reykjavík City Council)
- Constituting instrument: Local Government Act
- Formation: 1907
- First holder: Jón Þorláksson
- Deputy: Þórdís Lóa Þórhallsdóttir
- Salary: 1,976,025 ISK monthly (2021)
- Website: reykjavik.is/en (in English) reykjavik.is (in Icelandic)

The office of mayor of Reykjavík (Icelandic: Borgarstjóri Reykjavíkur) was created in 1907 and advertised in 1908. Páll Einarsson and Knud Zimsen applied for the job and Páll got the position for a period of six years, at the end of which he did not wish to renew his tenure. Rather than a direct election, Reykjavík City Council members elect the mayor from within their ranks.

Between 1932 and 1994 the centre-right Independence Party dominated Reykjavík municipal politics, but since then other parties have been more competitive. During the 2006–2010 term four people held the mayor position, due to an unprecedented amount of instability in Reykjavík's municipal coalition government caused in part by the 2008–2011 Icelandic financial crisis.

The incumbent mayor is Hildur Björnsdóttir, who took office in 2026. The city is governed by a coalition of the Independence Party, Reform Party (Viðreisn), and Progressive Party, which took office following the 2026 Reykjavík City Council election. As of 2026, Reykjavík has had 24 mayors, including 18 men and 6 women.

== List of mayors ==
No.	Portrait	Mayor	Took office	Left office	Duration	Party
1		Páll Einarsson (1868–1954)	7 May 1908	1 July 1914	6 years (2,246 days)	Independent
2		Knud Zimsen (1875–1953)	1 July 1914	30 December 1932	18 years, 7 months, 23 days (6,757 days)	Independent
3		Jón Þorláksson (1877–1935)	30 December 1932	20 March 1935	2 years, 2 months, 20 days (810 days)	Independence Party
4		Pétur Halldórsson (1887–1940)	20 March 1935	26 November 1940	5 years, 8 months, 6 days (2,078 days)	Independence Party
5		Bjarni Benediktsson (1908–1970)	26 November 1940	10 February 1947	6 years, 2 months, 15 days (2,267 days)	Independence Party
6		Gunnar Thoroddsen (1910–1983)	10 February 1947	19 November 1959	12 years, 9 months, 9 days (4,665 days)	Independence Party
7		Auður Auðuns (1911–1999)	19 November 1959	6 October 1960	10 months, 17 days (322 days)	Independence Party
8		Geir Hallgrímsson (1925–1990)	19 November 1959	1 December 1972	13 years, 12 days (4,761 days)	Independence Party
9		Birgir Ísleifur Gunnarsson (1936–2019)	1 December 1972	15 August 1978	5 years, 8 months, 14 days (2,083 days)	Independence Party
10		Egill Skúli Ingibergsson (1926–2021)	15 August 1978	27 May 1982	3 years, 9 months, 12 days (1,381 days)	Independent
11		Davíð Oddsson (1948–2026)	27 May 1982	16 July 1991	9 years, 1 month, 19 days (3,337 days)	Independence Party
12		Markús Örn Antonsson (b. 1943)	16 July 1991	17 March 1994	2 years, 8 months, 1 day (975 days)	Independence Party
13		Árni Sigfússon (b. 1956)	17 March 1994	13 June 1994	2 months, 27 days (88 days)	Independence Party
14		Ingibjörg Sólrún Gísladóttir (b. 1954)	13 June 1994	1 February 2003	8 years, 7 months, 19 days (3,155 days)	Reykjavík List
15		Þórólfur Árnason (b. 1957)	1 February 2003	30 November 2004	1 year, 9 months, 29 days (668 days)	Reykjavík List
16		Steinunn Valdís Óskarsdóttir (b. 1965)	30 November 2004	13 June 2006	1 year, 6 months, 14 days (560 days)	Reykjavík List
17		Vilhjálmur Þ. Vilhjálmsson (b. 1946)	13 June 2006	16 October 2007	1 year, 4 months, 3 days (490 days)	Independence Party
18		Dagur B. Eggertsson (b. 1972)	16 October 2007	24 January 2008	3 months, 8 days (100 days)	Social Democratic Alliance
19		Ólafur F. Magnússon (b. 1952)	24 January 2008	21 August 2008	6 months, 28 days (210 days)	Liberal Party
20		Hanna Birna Kristjánsdóttir (b. 1966)	21 August 2008	15 June 2010	1 year, 9 months, 25 days (663 days)	Independence Party
21		Jón Gnarr (b. 1967)	15 June 2010	16 June 2014	4 years, 2 days (1,463 days)	Best Party
(18)		Dagur B Eggertsson (b. 1972)	16 June 2014	16 January 2024	9 years, 7 months, 1 day (3,502 days)	Social Democratic Alliance
22		Einar Þorsteinsson (b. 1978)	16 January 2024	21 February 2025	1 year, 36 days (402 days)	Progressive Party
23		Heiða Björg Hilmisdóttir (b. 1971)	21 February 2025	2 June 2026	1 year, 101 days (466 days)	Social Democratic Alliance
24		Hildur Björnsdóttir (b. 1986)	2 June 2026	Incumbent	97 days	Independence Party

== See also ==
- Timeline of Reykjavík
