= Vilhjálmur Vilhjálmsson =

Vilhjálmur Vilhjálmsson may refer to:

- Vilhjálmur Þórmundur Vilhjálmsson (born 1946), Icelandic lawyer and politician
- Vilhjálmur Vilhjálmsson (singer) (1945–1978), Icelandic musician and singer
