= Contact point =

Contact point may refer to:

- ContactPoint, a defunct British government database for coordinating child-support services
- Contact Point, Antarctica, a small rock point on Hope Bay, Antarctica
- Adherent point, or contact point, in mathematics
- Contact breaker, a type of electrical switch

== See also ==
- Contact Point for Roma and Sinti Issues, a department within the Organization for Security and Co-operation in Europe
