= Kotlyarenko =

Kotlyarenko may refer to:

- Tatiana Kotlyarenko - international expert in human rights, human trafficking and addressing gender-based violence
- Eugene Kotlyarenko - Ukrainian-American film director, screenwriter, producer, and actor
- Nuta Kotlyarenko - also known as Nudie Cohn, a Ukrainian-American tailor who designed decorative rhinestone-covered suits, known popularly as "Nudie Suits", and other elaborate outfits for some of the most famous celebrities of his era
