= Egill Skúli Ingibergsson =

Icelandic politician (1926–2021)

9th Mayor of Reykjavík
- In office 15 August 1978 – 27 May 1982
- Preceded by: Birgir Ísleifur Gunnarsson
- Succeeded by: Davíð Oddsson

Personal details
- Born: 23 March 1926 Vestmannaeyjar, Kingdom of Iceland
- Died: 22 December 2021 (aged 95) Kópavogur, Iceland
- Spouse: Ólöf Elín Davíðsdóttir (m. 1952; died 2019)
- Children: 4
- Education: Electrical engineer, University of Iceland

Egill Skúli Ingibergsson (23 March 1926 – 22 December 2021) was an Icelandic electrical engineer and the Mayor of Reykjavík from 1978 to 1982.

== Death ==
Egill died on 22 December 2021, at the age of 95, at Landspítalinn's palliative care unit in Kópavogur.

Preceded by Birgir Ísleifur Gunnarsson	Mayor of Reykjavík; 1978–1982	Succeeded by Davíð Oddsson
