= Audrey Glover =

British international lawyer, election observer, DBE

Dame Audrey Glover
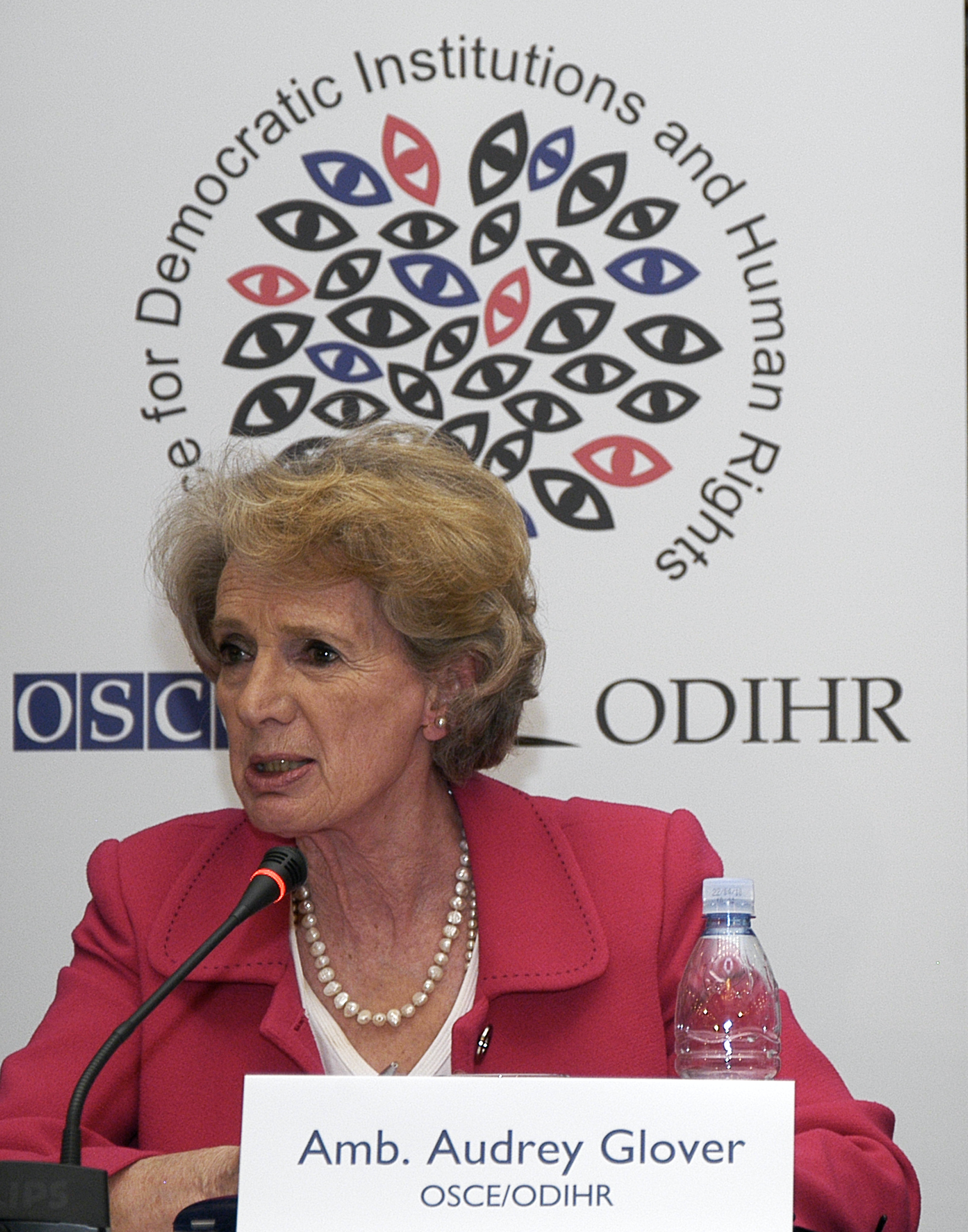
- Audrey Glover (2010)

Director of OSCE Office for Democratic Institutions and Human Rights
- In office 1994–1997
- Preceded by: Luchino Cortese
- Succeeded by: Gérard Stoudmann

Personal details
- Education: King's College London

Dame Audrey Francis Glover, DBE CMG, is a British international lawyer, experienced election observer, former director of Organization for Security and Co-operation in Europe Office for Democratic Institutions and Human Rights (1994-1997).

== Education ==
Glover graduated from King's College, London.

== Professional career ==
During her professional career, she has specialized in human rights law and its application, gender equality, negotiation and problem resolution and international election monitoring.

Audrey Glover was called to the Bar - as Gray's Inn member, where she practised before joining UK's Foreign and Commonwealth Office as a legal adviser. During her service for the FCO, on numerous occasions she represented UK as agent before the European Commission and Court of Human Rights.

In 1994, UK seconded her - in the rank of ambassador - as director for the OSCE Office for Democratic Institutions and Human Rights, where she served her mandate in Warsaw, Poland until 1997.

From 1998 to 2004, she has served as head of the UK Delegation to the UN Human Rights Commission.

Since 2004 Dame Audrey has led almost twenty international election observation missions. These were - for the OSCE - missions to the USA (2016), Mongolia (2013 and 2016), Albania (2015), Spain (2015), Hungary (2014), Bulgaria (2014), Ukraine (2012), Azerbaijan (2011), USA (2016), Turkey (2018), Albania (2019). She also co-led missions for the Carter Center: for the presidential elections in Tunisia (2014) and for the parliamentary elections in Guyana (2015).

She is also on the UN Mediation Roster.

Additionally, Audrey Glover serves as an adviser to the British Institute for Human Rights (since 1999), a trustee of the UK Prison Reform Trust (since 2005), Board Member of the Electoral Reform International Services (since 2006), an advisory member of the Board of Gender Action for Peace and Security (since 2012), and chair of the board of trustees for the Foreign Policy Centre (since 2018).

She is a Fellow of the Institute of Stability and Transition in Washington.

== Honours and awards ==
In the 1997 Birthday Honours she was awarded the Companion of the Order of St Michael and St George (CMG). In the 2004 New Year Honours she received made a Dame Commander of the Order of the British Empire (DBE).

== Publications ==
- British precedents on power to try impeachment - national government publication (1974)
- Labor rights of employees of the British government - national government publication (1975)
- Comparative study on wiretapping and electronic surveillance laws in major foreign countries - national government publication (1975)
- Labor rights of employees of the British Government - book (1977)
- Legal status of aliens in Australia - book (1977)
- Securing the future of democracy - book (1996)
- National minorities in Europe - article (1995)
- The human dimension of the Organisation on Security and Co-operation in Europe : the ODIHR in Warsaw - article (1997)
- The ODIHR: a useful tool - article (1996-1997)
