= Hanna Birna Kristjánsdóttir =

Icelandic politician (born 1966)

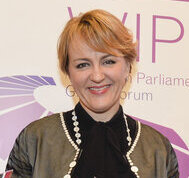
- Hanna Birna Kristjánsdóttir in 2013

Chair and Co-Founder of the Reykjavik Global Forum. Senior Advisor, UN Women
- Incumbent
- Assumed office 4 April 2016
- Prime Minister: Sigmundur Davíð Gunnlaugsson; Sigurður Ingi Jóhannsson; Bjarni Benediktsson; Katrín Jakobsdóttir

Minister of the Interior
- In office 23 May 2013 – 4 December 2014
- Prime Minister: Sigmundur Davíð Gunnlaugsson
- Preceded by: Ögmundur Jónasson
- Succeeded by: Ólöf Nordal

19th Mayor of Reykjavík
- In office 21 August 2008 – 15 June 2010
- Preceded by: Ólafur Friðrik Magnússon
- Succeeded by: Jón Gnarr

Personal details
- Born: 12 October 1966 (age 59) Hafnarfjörður, Iceland
- Party: Independence Party
- Spouse: Vilhjálmur Jens Árnason
- Children: 2
- Education: University of Iceland; University of Edinburgh

Hanna Birna Kristjánsdóttir (born 12 October 1966) is the Chair and Co-Founder of the Reykjavík Global Forum. She also serves as a Senior Advisor to UN Women. Hanna Birna is a former politician, Icelandic minister, mayor and parliamentarian.

She was the Minister of Interior after getting elected to the Althing (Icelandic parliament) in 2013, and was Mayor of Reykjavík from 21 August 2008 to 15 June 2010, the President for the city council from 2006 to 2008 and member of the city council from 2002 to 2013. She represented the Independence Party (Sjálfstæðisflokkur).

Hanna Birna Kristjánsdóttir was born on 12 October 1966 to Aðalheiður J. Björnsdóttir and Kristján Ármannsson. She was born and raised in Hafnarfjörður. She is married to business consultant Vilhjálmur Jens Árnason; they have two daughters.

She obtained a Bachelor of Arts degree in political science at the University of Iceland in 1991. After that, she got a Master of Science in international and European politics from the University of Edinburgh (1993).

By 1995, she was a member of the Independence Party, becoming a member of committee of the party's district association in Austurbær and Norðurmýri. She held various positions in the party, including Secretary General of the Parliamentary Group from 1995 to 1999 and Assistant Manager of the Independence Party from 1999 to 2006.

Hanna Birna Kristjánsdóttir was elected to the City Council of Reykjavík in 2002. From 2006 to 2008, she was the President of the City Council and the Chair of the Planning Committee. From 2008 to 2010 she was the Mayor of Reykjavík. In 2013, Hanna Birna Kristjánsdóttir was elected to the Parliament of Iceland as the first MP for the Reykjavík South constituency. In the same year, she was elected as the Vice Chairman of the Independence Party.

She became Minister of the Interior in 2013. On 21 November 2014, she resigned as Minister of the Interior as a response to one of her political assistant admitting leaking information regarding asylum seekers on 20 November 2013. Hanna Birna always claimed not having any knowledge of the wrongdoing of her assistant, but her resignation took effect on 4 December 2014 after the assistant pleaded guilty for the Reykjavík district court on 11 November 2014.

In 2015, Hanna Birna Kristjánsdóttir became chair of the Foreign Affairs Committee in the Parliament of Iceland. She decides not to run for the 2016 Icelandic parliamentary election at the end of her term as MP.

In 2016, she became the chair of the Executive Board of Women Political Leaders, Global Forum. She is currently the Chair and Co-Founder of the Reykjavik Global Forum, Women Leaders and also serves as a Senior Advisor to UN Women.

Political offices
| Preceded by | Chair of the Althing Foreign Affairs Committee; 8 September 2015 | Incumbent |
| Preceded by Ögmundur Jónasson | Minister of the Interior; 23 May 2013 – 4 December 2014 | Succeeded by Ólöf Nordal |
| Preceded by Ólafur Friðrik Magnússon | Mayor of Reykjavík; August 2008 – June 2010 | Succeeded by Jón Gnarr |
