= Markús Örn Antonsson =

Icelandic politician

Markús Örn Antonsson (born 25 May 1943 in Reykjavík, Iceland) is an Icelandic journalist and politician. He was the Mayor of Reykjavík from 1991 to 1994.

== Education and journalism career ==
Markús Örn graduated from Reykjavík Junior College in 1965 and was an exchange student in the United States. He worked as a part-time journalist and photographer at the daily Morgunblaðið from 1961 to 1965 and was trained in broadcast journalism and television production in the UK and Sweden, then worked as a reporter and programme producer at Ríkisútvarpið (RÚV) TV. He served as a member of the Broadcasting Council from 1979 to 1985 and as chairman from 1983 to 1985. Markús Örn then served as Director General of the RÚV TV and Radio from 1985 to 1991 and as Director General of RÚV TV and Radio from 1998 to 2005.

== Political career ==
Markús Örn served as a city councillor in Reykjavík from 1970 to 1985 and was a member of the executive committee of the Reykjavík City Council and chairman of several committee and was president of the City Council from 1983 to 1985. He served as Mayor of Reykjavík from 1991 to 1994.

Markús Örn was appointed the Icelandic Ambassador to Canada on 1 November 2005.

Preceded by Davíð Oddsson	Mayor of Reykjavík; 1991–1994	Succeeded by Árni Sigfússon
