= Birgir Ísleifur Gunnarsson =

Icelandic politician and lawyer (1936–2019)

8th Mayor of Reykjavík
- In office 1 December 1972 – 28 May 1978
- Preceded by: Geir Hallgrímsson
- Succeeded by: Egill Skúli Ingibergsson

Personal details
- Born: 19 July 1936; Reykjavík, Kingdom of Iceland
- Died: 28 October 2019 (aged 83); Kópavogur, Iceland
- Spouse: Sonja Backman (m. 1956; died 2019)
- Children: 4
- Education: Lawyer
- Alma mater: University of Iceland

Birgir Ísleifur Gunnarsson (19 July 1936 – 28 October 2019) was an Icelandic politician and lawyer. He was the governor of the Central Bank of Iceland from 1991 to 2005.

Birgir was the mayor of Reykjavík from 1972 to 1978, member of parliament from 1979 to 1991 for the Independence Party, and served as the minister of education from 1987 to 1988. From 1965 to 1991 he was a board member of the National Power Company of Iceland.

Preceded by Geir Hallgrímsson	Mayor of Reykjavík; 1972–1978	Succeeded by Egill Skúli Ingibergsson
