= Maria Telalian =

Greek diplomat

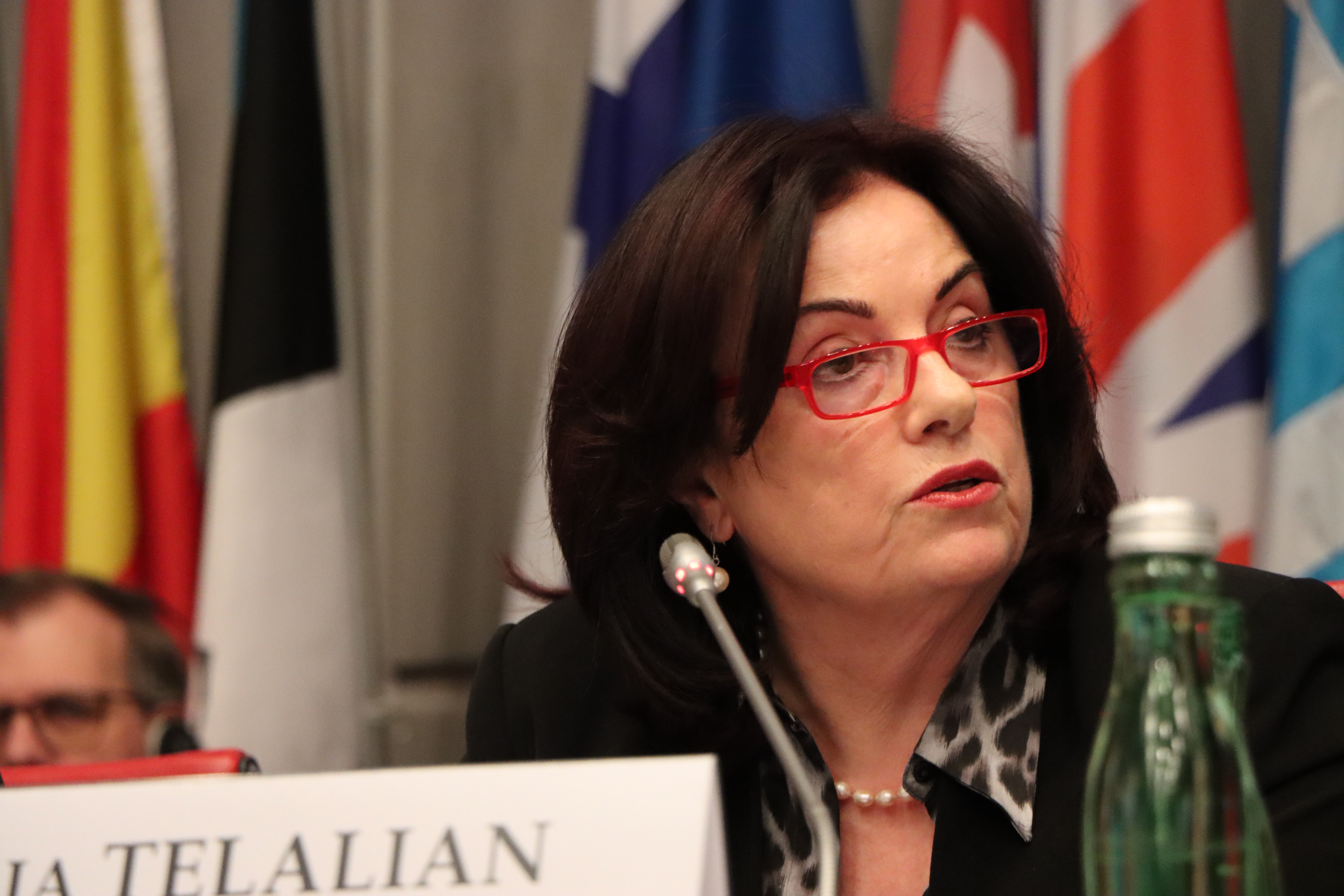
Telalian addresses OSCE PA human rights committee in Vienna, 20 Feb. 2025

Maria Telalian (Greek: Μαρία Τελαλιάν) is a Greek diplomat currently serving as the Director of the OSCE Office for Democratic Institutions and Human Rights (ODIHR). She was appointed to this position in December 2024. In her role, she oversees efforts to promote democracy, human rights, and the rule of law across the OSCE participating states.

== Career ==
Prior to her appointment as ODIHR Director, Telalian held various diplomatic and governmental positions related to international relations, human rights, and democratic governance, working within the OSCE framework and cooperation with European institutions.

As ODIHR Director, Telalian is responsible for coordinating election observation missions, monitoring human rights violations, and supporting legal reforms to strengthen democratic institutions. She works to address human rights issues related to conflicts, including monitoring violations by Russian forces in Ukraine.
