= Þórólfur Árnason =

Icelandic businessman and politician

Mayor of Reykjavík, Iceland
- In office 1 February 2003 – 30 November 2004
- Preceded by: Ingibjörg Gísladóttir
- Succeeded by: Steinunn Óskarsdóttir

Þórólfur Árnason is an Icelandic businessman and politician, who served as Mayor of Reykjavík from 1 February 2003 to 30 November 2004. He replaced Ingibjörg Sólrún Gísladóttir after the Left Greens and the Progressive Party had demanded that she resign. His appointment as mayor was a compromise between the three parties that formed the majority of the city council. Having never been involved in politics before, but a well-known executive for some of Iceland's largest companies, Þórólfur was considered a "mayor-for-hire" by the council – a manager of day-to-day city affairs rather than a political leader or policymaker.

He resigned on 30 November 2004 after a controversy regarding Icelandic oil companies' breach of competition law, as he had formerly held a managerial position in one of the companies.

After Þórólfur's time as mayor, he became chief executive of Icelandic Group in May 2005.

Preceded by Ingibjörg S. Gísladóttir	Mayor of Reykjavík; 2003–2004	Succeeded by Steinunn V. Óskarsdóttir
