= Ólafur Friðrik Magnússon =

Icelandic politician (born 1952)

Mayor of Reykjavík
- In office 24 January 2008 – 21 August 2008
- Preceded by: Dagur Eggertsson
- Succeeded by: Hanna Kristjánsdóttir

Personal details
- Born: 3 August 1952 (age 74) Akureyri, Iceland
- Party: F-list

Ólafur Friðrik Magnússon (born 3 August 1952) is an Icelandic politician. He is a former mayor of Reykjavík. His term was from 24 January 2008 to 21 August 2008. He was originally expected to step down in March 2009, when a representative from the Independence Party was to assume the office of the mayor, as agreed upon in the coalition agreement between Ólafur and the Independence Party. According to that same agreement Ólafur would at the same time become the chairman of the executive committee of the City Council of Reykjavík.

However, in August 2008, the coalition between Ólafur and the Independence Party broke down. On 21 August, Hanna Birna Kristjánsdóttir succeeded Ólafur as mayor. Ólafur made it into the news on 19 January 2010 when he was reprimanded at a meeting of the City Council for circulating a rude poem about Hanna. He has been a prominent opponent of Reykjavík's first purpose-built mosque.

Preceded by Dagur B. Eggertsson	Mayor of Reykjavík; January 2008 – August 2008	Succeeded by Hanna Birna Kristjánsdóttir
