= Ingibjörg Sólrún Gísladóttir =

Icelandic politician (born 1954)

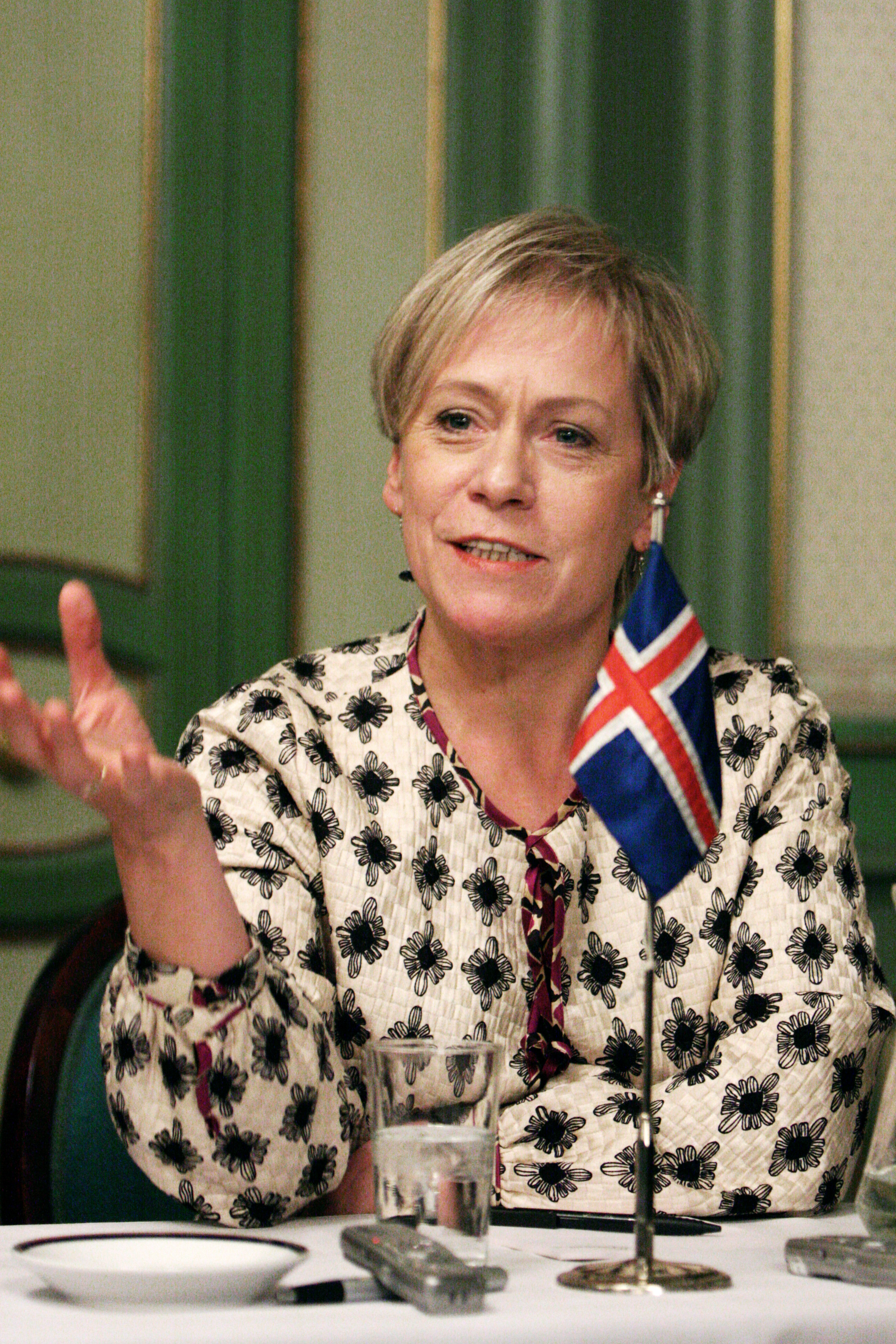
- Ingibjörg Sólrún Gísladóttir on 31 October 2007

Minister for Foreign Affairs
- In office 24 May 2007 – 1 February 2009
- Prime Minister: Geir Haarde
- Preceded by: Valgerður Sverrisdóttir
- Succeeded by: Össur Skarphéðinsson

Mayor of Reykjavík
- In office 13 June 1994 – 1 February 2003
- Preceded by: Árni Sigfússon
- Succeeded by: Þórólfur Árnason

Director of OSCE Office for Democratic Institutions and Human Rights
- In office 19 July 2017 – 2020
- Preceded by: Michael Georg Link
- Succeeded by: Matteo Mecacci

Personal details
- Born: 31 December 1954 (age 71) Reykjavík, Iceland
- Party: Social Democratic Alliance (since 2000); Women's List (until 2000)
- Spouse: Hjörleifur Sveinbjörnsson
- Children: Two sons (b. 1983, 1985)
- Education: University of Iceland; University of Copenhagen

Ingibjörg Sólrún Gísladóttir (pronounced [ˈiɲcɪpjœrk ˈsoulrun ˈcistlaˌtouʰtɪr̥]; born 31 December 1954) is an Icelandic politician from the Social Democratic Alliance who has served as Minister for Foreign Affairs (2007–2009) and leader of the Alliance (2005–2009). She served as representative of UN Women in Afghanistan from 2012 to 2014 and later in Turkey as designated Regional Director for Europe and Central Asia.

== Education ==
Sólrún received her bachelor's degree in history and literature from the University of Iceland in 1979. She then studied in Denmark as a guest student of the post -graduate studies in history at the University of Copenhagen (1979-1981). In 1981, she came back to Iceland where she graduated as a cand.mag. in history from University of Iceland in 1983.

In addition to her native Icelandic, Sólrún speaks English, French and Danish.

== Political career ==
Sólrún started her political career in the Women's List (Samtök um kvennalista), a party she had co-founded in 1982 and later represented in Reykjavík's City Council from 1982 to 1988. She also represented the party in Parliament from 1991 to 1994.

Sólrún became Mayor of Reykjavík in 1994 when she led a coalition of four political parties called Reykjavíkurlistinn, winning the elections. She was the city's Mayor until 2003.

In 2004 Sólrún took a brief leave from politics and instead attended the European Institute, London School of Economics (LSE) as a visiting scholar.

In 2005 Sólrún became the leader of the Social Democratic Alliance (Samfylkingin), then the second largest political party in the Althing (Iceland's parliament), after a sharply contested election between her and the previous party leader Össur Skarphéðinsson. She has served in this position until 2009.

On 24 May 2007, Sólrún was appointed foreign minister and served in the office until 1 February 2009.

== Later career ==
On 19 July 2017, Sólrún began her mandate as the Director of OSCE Office for Democratic Institutions and Human Rights, where she succeeded Michael Georg Link. In June 2020, the governments of Tajikistan and Turkey blocked the renewal of Ingibjörg Sólrún's mandate. She subsequently led the OSCE's Observation Mission in the 2020 Ukrainian local elections.

In 2021, Sólrún was appointed by United Nations Secretary-General António Guterres as his new Deputy Special Representative for Political Affairs and Electoral Assistance of the United Nations Assistance Mission for Iraq (UNAMI), under the leadership of Special Representative Jeanine Hennis-Plasschaert.

In August 2022, Guterres appointed Sólrún to the United Nations fact-finding mission, led by Carlos Alberto dos Santos Cruz, regarding the Olenivka prison massacre in Ukraine.

== Other activities ==
- Center for International Peace Operations (ZIF), Member of the International Advisory Board
- Nordic Women Mediators (NWM), Member

== Personal life ==
Sólrún was born in Reykjavík on 31 December 1954. She is married to Hjörleifur Sveinbjörnsson, lecturer and translator of Chinese language. They have two sons.

Political offices
Preceded by Árni Sigfússon	Mayor of Reykjavík; 1994–2003	Succeeded by Þórólfur Árnason
Preceded by Valgerður Sverrisdóttir	Minister for Foreign Affairs; 2007–2009	Succeeded by Össur Skarphéðinsson
Party political offices
Preceded by Össur Skarphéðinsson	Chairman of the Social Democratic Alliance; 2005–2009	Succeeded by Jóhanna Sigurðardóttir
