= Icelandic Red Cross =

Humanitarian organization in Iceland

Icelandic Red Cross (Icelandic: Rauði krossinn) has its headquarters in Reykjavík.
