= List of resignations in Iceland =

This is a list of resignations in Iceland.

== Cabinet ministers ==
Resignations of cabinet ministers do not take effect until they have been relieved of duty by the President of Iceland.

Image	Person	Position	Date of resignation	Date of relief	Reason	Ref
	Albert Guðmundsson (IP)	Minister of Industry	—	24 March 1987	Financial scandal.	
	Björgvin G. Sigurðsson (SDA)	Minister of Commerce	25 January 2009	1 February 2009	2008–2011 Icelandic financial crisis.	
	Guðmundur Árni Stefánsson (SDP)	Minister of Social Affairs	—	11 November 1994	Civil servant dismissal.	
	Hanna Birna Kristjánsdóttir (IP)	Minister of the Interior	21 November 2014	4 December 2014	Political scandal.	
	Magnús Guðmundsson (CP)	Minister of Justice	—	11 November 1932	Political scandal.	
	Magnús Jónsson (IP)	Minister of Finance	—	18 April 1923	Political dispute.	
	Sigmundur Davíð Gunnlaugsson (PP)	Prime Minister	5 April 2016	7 April 2016	Financial scandal revealed by the Panama Papers.	
	Sigríður Á. Andersen (IP)	Minister of Justice	13 March 2019	14 March 2019	Political scandal.	
	Ögmundur Jónasson (LGM)	Minister of Health	30 September 2009	1 October 2009	Political dispute.	

== Members of Parliament ==
Image	Person	Date	Reason	Ref
	Árni Johnsen (IP)	19 July 2001	Embezzlement of funds of a committee of the National Theatre of Iceland.	
	Bjarni Harðarson (PP)	11 November 2008	Political scandal regarding him accidentally forwarding criticism of a fellow party member to all major news media.	
	Guðni Ágústsson (PP)	17 November 2008	Political dispute regarding the policies of his party.	
	Steinunn Valdís Óskarsdóttir (SDA)	27 May 2010	Political scandal regarding the financing of her political campaign.	
