= Árni Sigfússon =

Icelandic politician

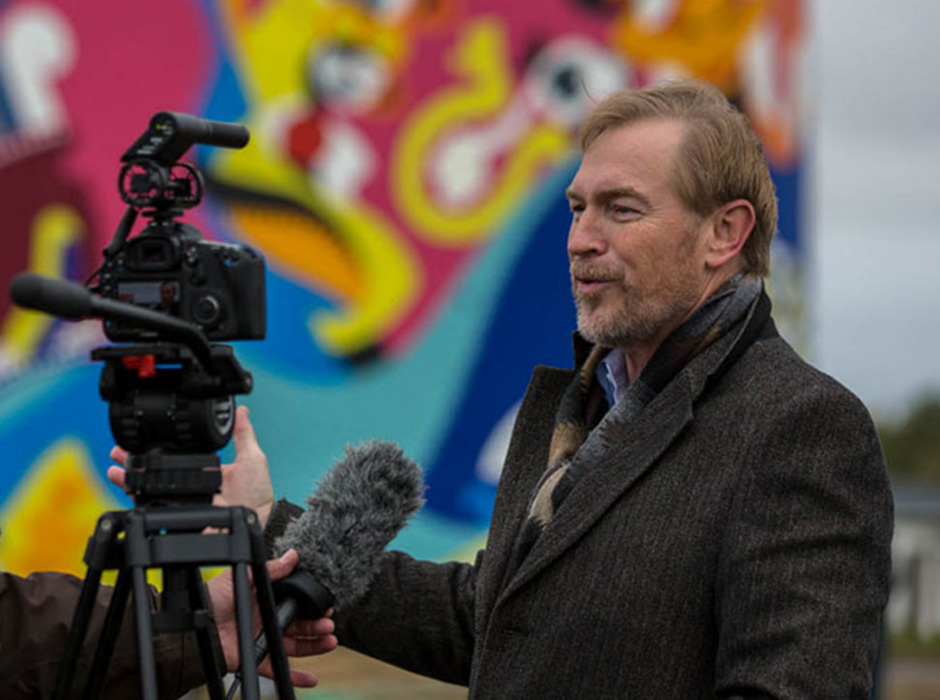
Sigfússon in 2013

Árni Sigfússon (born 30 July 1956) is the former mayor of Reykjavík, Iceland's capital and of Reykjanesbær (2002 - June 2014).

As a city council member since 1986, he stepped in as a mayor in Reykjavík for a few months for his party in 1994 when his party was getting very poor ratings from polls. After his appointment he managed to lead the party to over 47% in the 1994 elections. He was on the board of Heimdallur from 1976 to 1979 and was its chairman from 1981 to 1983. He then later became the chairman of SUS, the youth organisation of the Independence Party.

His focus in local government on raising standards of primary education and on new high tech and well paid jobs, has been recognised in Iceland.

Before taking on the position as Mayor of Reykjanesbær he was the chief executive of the Icelandic Management Association (Stjórnunarfélagið) and the CEO of the IT company Tæknival. He studied education at the Educational College of Iceland and Public Administration at the University of Tennessee in the United States.

Preceded by Markús Örn Antonsson	Mayor of Reykjavík; 1994	Succeeded by Ingibjörg Sólrún Gísladóttir

Preceded by Ellert Eiríksson	Mayor of Reykjanesbær; 11 June 2002 - June 2014	Succeeded by pending
