= Matteo Mecacci =

Italian diplomat (born 1975)

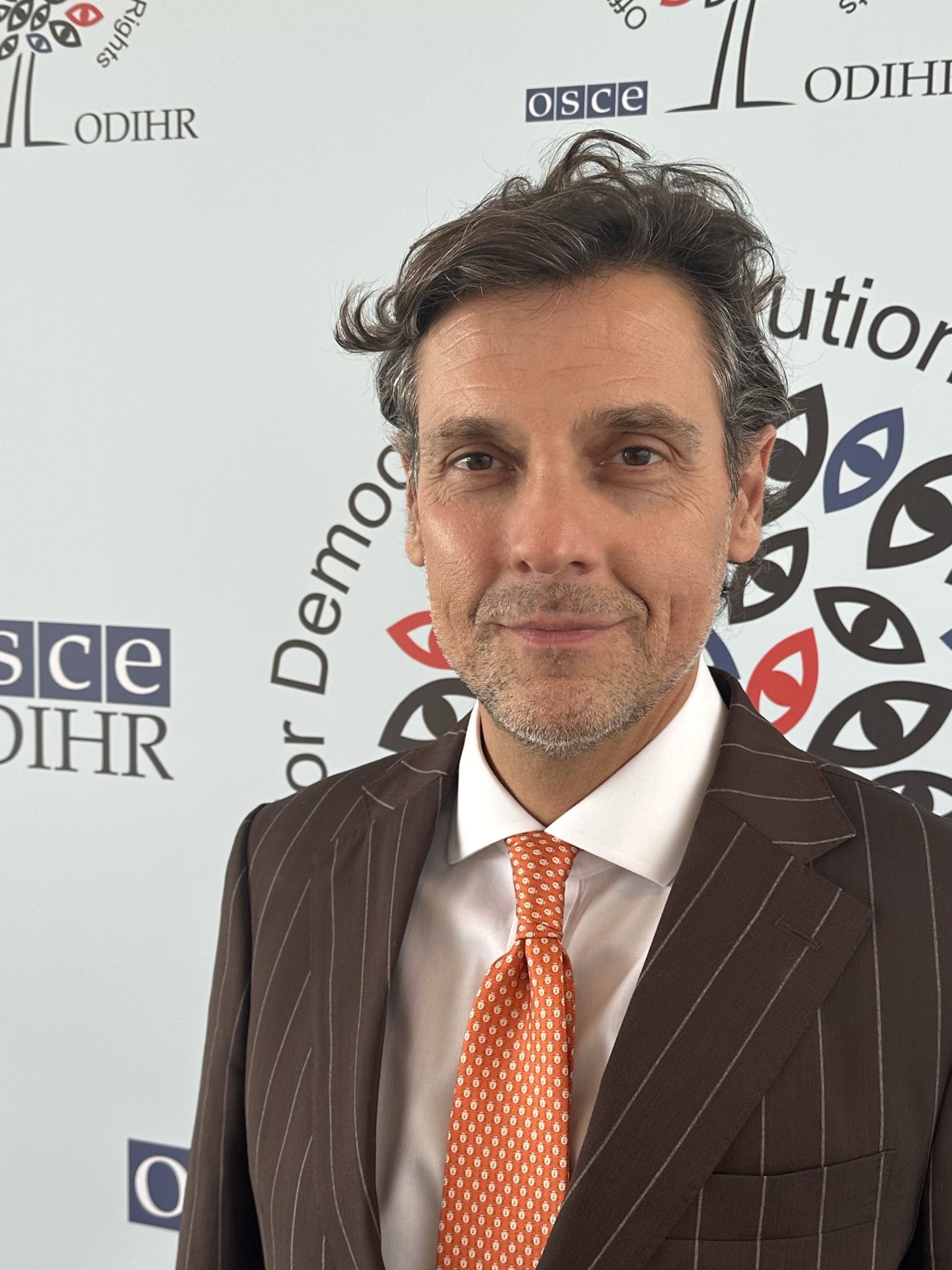
- ODIHR Director Matteo Mecacci at the Warsaw Human Dimension Conference, 6 October 2023

Director of OSCE Office for Democratic Institutions and Human Rights
- Incumbent
- Assumed office 2021
- Preceded by: Katarzyna Gardapkhadze
- Succeeded by: dr Tea Jaliashvili

Personal details
- Born: 21 February 1975 (age 51) Florence, Italy
- Party: Radicali Italiani
- Spouse: Barbara Mecacci
- Education: University of Florence
- Profession: Diplomat
- Website: www.osce.org/node/475457; nuovo.camera.it/29?shadow_deputato=302752

Matteo Mecacci (born 21 February 1975) is an Italian diplomat. From December 2020 to August 2024 served as director of the OSCE's Office for Democratic Institutions and Human Rights (ODHIR). In the past, he was a Radical Party Member of Parliament in Italy and elected in the lists of the Democratic Party, President of the International Campaign for Tibet and leading advocate for the International Criminal Court, the abolition of the death penalty, religious freedom and other prominent human rights campaigns.

== Personal life and education ==
Matteo Mecacci was born in Florence, Italy on 21 February 1975. He studied international law in his hometown at the University of Florence.

== Political career ==
=== Beginnings ===
Soon after graduation, Mecacci started to work in New York for No Peace Without Justice and the Transnational Radical Party (TRP), a non-governmental organization with the consultative status at the Economic and Social Council (ECOSOC) of the United Nations (UN). During his service (from 2001 to 2008) for the TRP and NPWJ, Mecacci coordinated and participated in various campaigns concerning the promotion of democracy and the protection of human rights. Among them were the campaign for creation of the International Criminal Court and the campaign for the universal moratorium on the death penalty, which led to the adoption (on 18 December 2007) by the UN General Assembly of a Resolution calling on the member countries of the United Nations for a universal moratorium on death penalty, and which received the favorable vote of over 100 countries.

Working from the United States, he was among the promoters of a coalition of international NGOs in favor of the reform of the United Nations and in particular of the UN Commission for Human Rights, later reformed with the creation of the United Nations Human Rights Council.

He was among the promoters of the creation of the International Steering Committee of the Community of Democracies, a coalition of Democratic countries promoted in the late 1990s by the American administration and a number of new democracy countries.

=== Member of Parliament (2008–2013) ===
Thanks to an agreement between the Italian Radicals and the Democratic Party, in the 2008 general elections Mecacci became a candidate for the Chamber of Deputies, in the Lazio 2 constituency, being included in the Democratic Party lists and being elected deputy of the XVI Legislature.

In parliament, Mecacci served on the Committee on Foreign Affairs Commission. In addition to his committee assignments, he was a member of the Italian delegation to the OSCE Parliamentary Assembly.

As soon as he was elected, Mecacci was appointed President of the Parliamentary Inter-group for Tibet in the Italian Parliament which includes over 120 Deputies and Senators. A motion signed by him was unanimously approved on 10 March 2008 by the Chamber of Deputies on the occasion of the 50th anniversary of the Lhasa Uprising.

In November 2009, Mecacci organized the 5th World Congress of Parliamentarians on Tibet in Rome, at the Chamber of Deputies, which saw the participation of over 100 MPs from over 30 countries. At that time the establishment of the International Network of Parliamentarians on Tibet (INPaT) was promoted, of which he became co-president in June 2010 - together with the European Parliamentarian Thomas Mann.

As a MoP, in January 2009 he came to the fore for organizing parliamentary obstruction against the approval of the Friendship Treaty between Italy and Libya signed by Silvio Berlusconi and colonel Muammar Gaddafi.

On 20 January 2009 he promoted and organized a public demonstration with the Transnational Radical Party against the friendship agreement between Silvio Berlusconi and Muammar Gaddafi.

On 9 November 2010, with 274 yes and 261 no, a motion presented by him was approved in the Chamber, despite the contrary opinion of the Italian government and the majority parliamentary groups, precisely on the Italy-Libya friendship treaty, which provides for the commitment to clarify the terms of the agreements.

On 2 July 2009, in Vilnius (Lithuania) he was elected rapporteur of the OSCE Committee on Democracy, Human Rights and Humanitarian Affairs. This role was unanimously reconfirmed by the Parliamentary Assembly in July 2010 in Oslo where he was also elected Chairman of the Liberal and Democratic Group of the OSCE Parliamentary Assembly.

On behalf of the OSCE Parliamentary Assembly, he participated in numerous election observation missions, including: Moldova (July 2009), United Kingdom (May 2010), Bosnia and Herzegovina (October 2010), United States (November 2010), Belarus (December 2010), Kazakhstan as Deputy Head of Delegation of the OSCE Mission (April 2011), Macedonia and Turkey (June 2011).

On 9 July 2011, Mecacci was unanimously elected Chairman of the OSCE Parliamentary Assembly's Committee on Democracy, Human Rights and Humanitarian Affairs at the 20th Annual Session of the Parliamentary Assembly of the Organization for Security and Co-operation in Europe (OSCE PA) which took place from 6 to 10 July 2011 in Belgrade, Serbia.

=== Head of the OSCE/ODIHR Election Observation Mission (August 2013 - October 2013) ===
From August 2013 until October 2013 Mecacci led the OSCE/ODIHR Election Observation Mission for the Presidential Election in Georgia

=== President of the International Campaign for Tibet (December 2013 - December 2020) ===
In December 2013, Mecacci was selected as President of the International Campaign for Tibet, a leading international human rights groups advocating for the respect of human rights and Democratic freedom for the Tibetan Peale and for a negotiated solution with the Chinese government.

Over the years he successfully advocated with the US Congress for the passage of groundbreaking legislation such as the Reciprocal Access to Tibet Act of 2018, or the Tibetan Policy and Support Act of 2020, after many years since the first related legislation on Tibet had been passed by Congress.

=== Director of OSCE/ODIHR (nomination December 2020) ===
On 4 December 2020, Mecacci was appointed Director of OSCE/ODIHR. He took on the Office in January 2021.

== Occasional academic activities ==
In March 2011 Mecacci participated as International Consultant at the National Constitution Reform Conference in Accra, Ghana. In May 2011 he gave a lecture on the role of the OSCE in the master program of Peacekeeping and Security Studies at the Faculty of Political Science - Roma Tre University.

Over the period of 2010–2020, Mecacci attended numerous governmental, parliamentary and non-governmental conferences in different parts of the world, on issues related to the promotion of democracy and the protection of human rights, both in the United Nations and in the European Union.
