= Steinunn Valdís Óskarsdóttir =

Icelandic politician (born 1965)

Mayor of Reykjavík, Iceland
- In office 30 November (1 December) 2004 – 13 June 2006
- Preceded by: Þórólfur Árnason
- Succeeded by: Vilhjálmur Vilhjálmsson

Personal details
- Born: 7 April 1965 (age 61) Reykjavík, Iceland
- Party: Social Democratic Alliance

Steinunn Valdís Óskarsdóttir (born 7 April 1965) is an Icelandic politician, and a former mayor of Reykjavík. She was the mayor from 30 November 2004 to 13 June 2006; took over after Þórólfur Árnason resignation. Steinunn is a member of The Social Democratic Alliance. She was a member of and later also the deputy speaker of the Alþingi until her resignation in 2010.

Preceded by Þórólfur Árnason	Mayor of Reykjavík; 2004–2006	Succeeded by Vilhjálmur Þ. Vilhjálmsson
