= Tatiana Kotlyarenko =

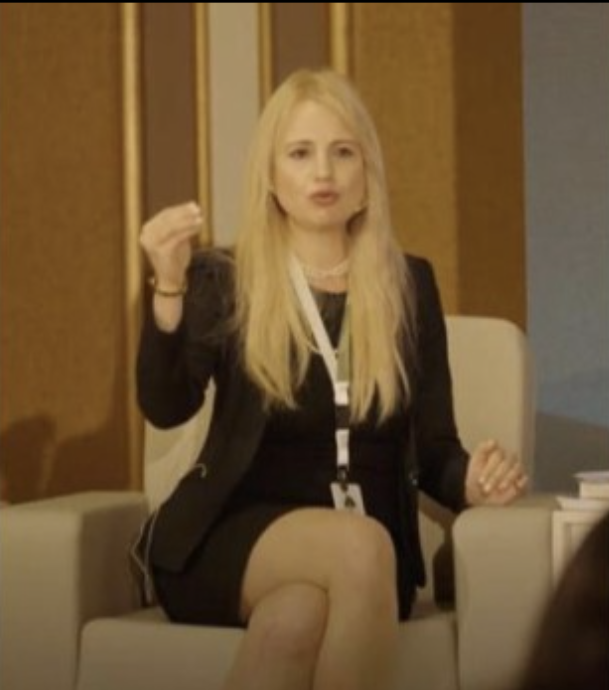
- Tatiana Kotlyarenko moderating a side event on CRSV in Erbil 2025
- Education: Columbia University, Brandeis University
- Known for: Anti-trafficking activism
- Awards: The Last Girl Lifetime Cultural Change Award: The Champion

Tatiana Kotlyarenko is an international human rights expert specializing in addressing human trafficking and gender-based violence. Her work includes policy development, advocacy, and international cooperation to combat human trafficking and promote human rights, including her service as the Adviser on Anti-Trafficking Issues at the Office for Democratic Institutions and Human Rights (ODIHR) of the Organization for Security and Co-operation in Europe (OSCE).

== Early life and education ==
Tatiana Kotlyarenko pursued higher education with a focus on human rights and international relations. Kotlyarenko holds a Bachelor's degree from Brandeis University. In 2007, she graduated with Master's degree in the Human Rights and Economic Development with Honors from Columbia University. Her academic background provided a strong foundation for her subsequent career in human rights and anti-trafficking work, with her master dissertation written on "Supply and Demand Dynamics of Sex Trafficking in Russia.”

== Career ==
=== Early career ===
Kotlyarenko began her career working with various non-governmental organizations (NGOs) and international bodies focused on human rights. After graduation with her masters, she began her internship in the Europe and Central Asia Department at the Human Rights Watch.

Her early work involved direct engagement with victims of human trafficking, providing support and advocacy for their rights. She quickly established herself as a knowledgeable and dedicated professional in the field.

=== Civil society engagement ===
Tatiana Kotlyarenko founded and served as the Chief Executive Director (ED/CEO) of the Enslavement Prevention Alliance – West Africa (EPAWA) in Ghana. Within its first three months, EPAWA launched a national anti-human trafficking campaign, the Red Card campaign, in partnership with the International Labour Organization (ILO) during the 2008 Africa Cup of Nations, and Short Message Service (SMS) project across the country. Additionally, EPAWA was instrumental in rescuing 60 girls from a child brothel. In her role as ED, Kotlyarenko developed strong relationships with international and local media, as well as development partners, to raise awareness, enhance visibility, and provide assistance to victims of human trafficking.

=== Role at OSCE/ODIHR ===
In her role at OSCE/ODIHR, Tatiana Kotlyarenko serves as the Adviser on Anti-Trafficking Issues. Since her appointment in 2016, she has been instrumental in shaping policies and programs aimed at preventing human trafficking and supporting victims. Her work involves collaborating with member states, NGOs, and other international organizations to develop comprehensive strategies and best practices for combating trafficking in persons.

Kotlyarenko's contributions include the development of the National Referral Mechanism Handbook, which provides practical guidance for protecting the rights of trafficked persons. The National Referral Mechanism (NRM) has been implemented by governments across the OSCE region, with Kotlyarenko's guidance in her role as OSCE/ODIHR Adviser on Anti-Trafficking Issues. The NRM Handbook was translated to Ukrainian and Russian under her guidance.

She has also played a key role in launching the International Survivors of Trafficking Advisory Council (ISTAC), a body that advises ODIHR on anti-trafficking policies and includes survivors from across the OSCE region (OSCE).

During COVID-19 pandemic, Kotlyarenko initiated and served as the lead author of a publication on Addressing Emerging Human Trafficking Trends and Consequences of the COVID-19 Pandemic, published under the institutional authorship of OSCE/ODIHR and UN Women.

Together with the team of experts from ISTAC, Kotlyarenko developed and delivered numerous trainings on "Addressing human trafficking risks in light of military attack on Ukraine: Training for civil society and frontline responders", based on the NRM principles, and organized within the ODIHR's Advancing the Human Dimension of Security in Ukraine project framework.

=== Advocacy and public speaking ===
Beyond her work at OSCE/ODIHR, Kotlyarenko is a recognized advocate for human rights and anti-trafficking measures, sexual violence, and exploitation in conflict and humanitarian contexts.

She is frequent speaker and moderator at international conferences, seminars, and policy forums, contributing expertise on combating human trafficking, sexual violence, and exploitation in conflict and humanitarian settings. She also often contributes to creating effective strategies to combat trafficking in role of expert contributor or workshop moderator. Through her advisory and expert work, Kotlyarenko has contributed to the development of anti-trafficking policies and strategies, training frameworks and educational curricula, and response mechanisms in North America, Africa, the Middle East, Europe, and Central Asia.

Kotlyarenko has addressed issues of sexual violence and human trafficking in armed conflict at high-level international venues, including events associated with the United Nations General Assembly and the Organization for Security and Co-operation in Europe (OSCE). She has also provided expert testimony at a United States congressional hearing focused on protecting Ukrainian refugees from trafficking.

In 2010, she participated in a CNN International documentary film Innocence for Sale, filmed in Cambodia, which examined child trafficking and sexual exploitation.

Her advocacy work also encompasses emerging challenges at the intersection of technology, conflict, and human rights. Kotlyarenko has contributed to discussions on the protection of children in cyberspace and the use of digital technologies, including artificial intelligence (AI), in peacebuilding and survivor-centered responses to conflict-related sexual violence. She has spoken on these topics at international events and expert panels, including forums linked to the United Nations and the World Economic Forum.

Following the full-scale Russian invasion of Ukraine in 2022, which particularly affects women and children, Tatiana Kotlyarenko has conducted rapid assessment missions and provided recommendations to governments and institutions on preventing and responding to the trafficking of Ukrainian women and children. Additionally, in her personal capacity, she has also been involved in humanitarian response efforts related to crises in Ukraine and Afghanistan, supporting initiatives aimed at responding to sexual exploitation and abuse of women and children, including evacuation-related activities.

In 2025, Tatiana Kotlyarenko accepted the invitation to join the G20 Interfaith Forum's (IF20) newly established Human Trafficking Working Group as group's member.

== Publications and research ==
Tatiana Kotlyarenko has authored and contributed to numerous publications on human trafficking and human rights. Her research focuses on the intersection of trafficking, migration, and human rights, offering critical analysis and recommendations for policymakers and practitioners.

== Awards and recognition ==
Her dedication and impact in the field of human rights and anti-trafficking have been acknowledged by various organizations and institutions:

- In 2022, Kotlyarenko received the Champion title at the Last Girl Awards, presented by Asia Society, recognizing contributions to efforts against human trafficking and exploitation.
- She has also been recognized through inclusion in initiatives such as 100 Women of Davos and the BMW Responsible Leaders.
- In June 2026, Tatiana Kotlyarenko, a person "who has contributed not only to the academic community, but who has also made an impact in society" received the 2026 Dean’s Award for Distinguished Achievement from her alma mater: Columbia University.
