= Contact Point for Roma and Sinti Issues =

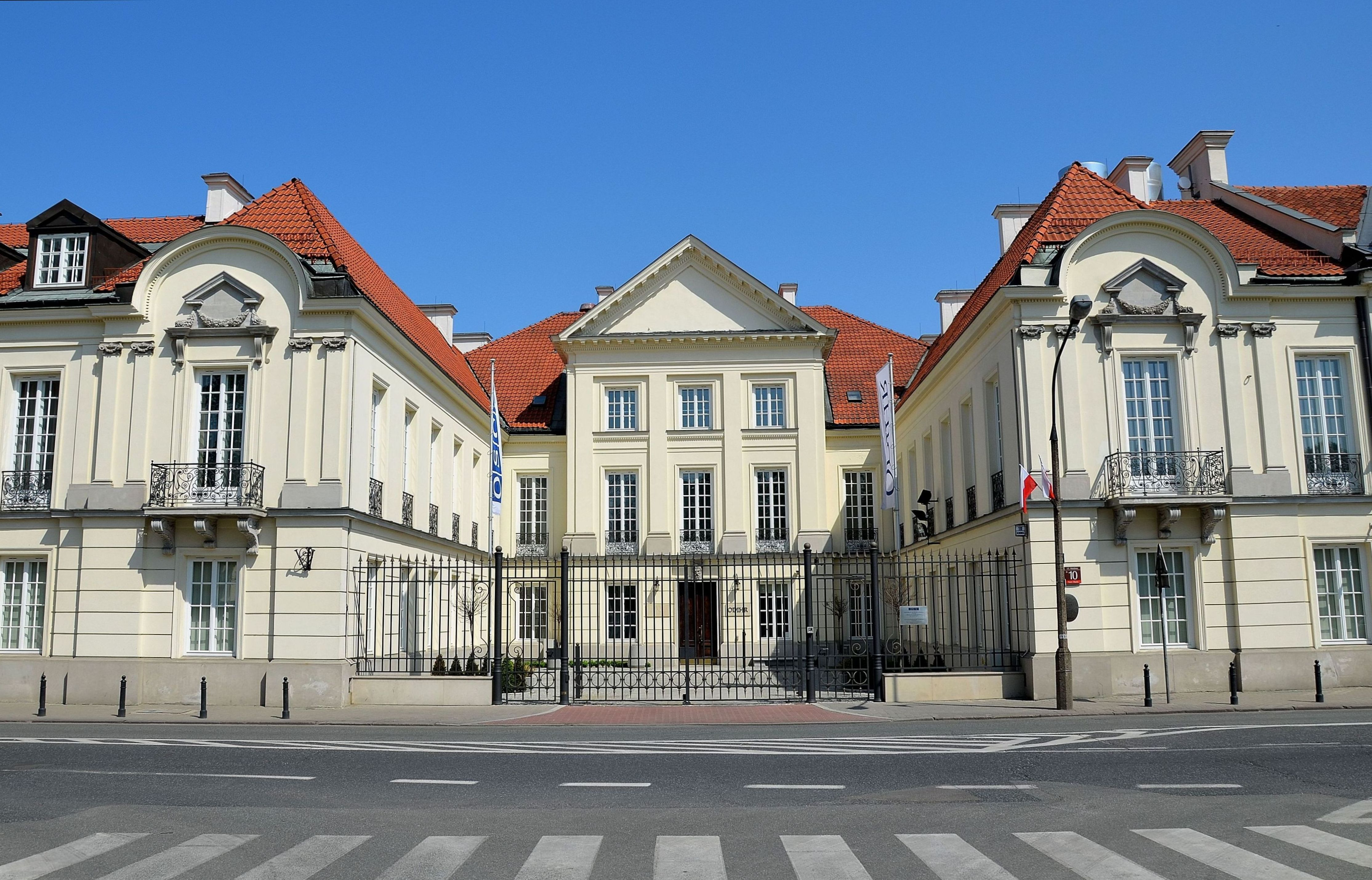
Młodziejowski Palace in Warsaw, Poland - the seat of ODIHR

The Contact Point for Roma and Sinti Issues (CPRSI) is a department within the OSCE Office for Democratic Institutions and Human Rights (ODIHR) dedicated to assist governments in implementing their commitments relating to the rights of Roma and Sinti populations. The CPRSI works closely also with the civil society organizations and bringing together civil society and OSCE participating States authorities on the issues relevant to the situation and rights of Roma and Sinti.

The Contact Point was created by the participating States of the OSCE at the 1994 Budapest Summit. Its mandate was strengthened at the 1998 Ministerial Council in Oslo.

One of the Contact Point's main tasks is to assist the participating States of the OSCE to implement the OSCE Action Plan on Improving the Situation of Roma and Sinti adopted with consensus in 2003.
