= Dagur B. Eggertsson =

Icelandic politician (born 1972)

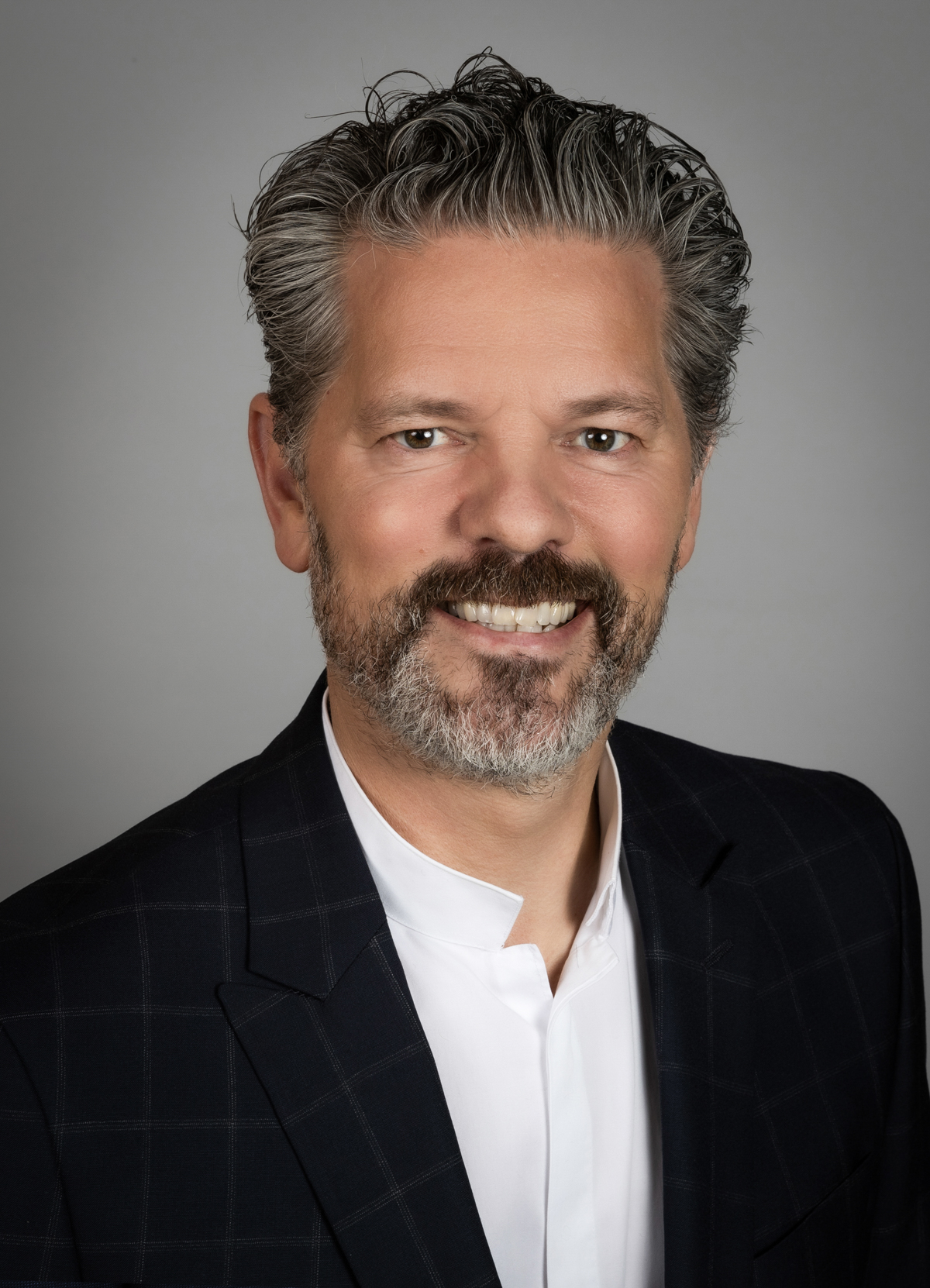
- Official portrait, 2025

Member of the Althing
- Incumbent
- Assumed office 30 November 2024
- Constituency: Reykjavík North

17th and 21st Mayor of Reykjavík
- In office 16 June 2014 – 16 January 2024
- Preceded by: Jón Gnarr
- Succeeded by: Einar Þorsteinsson
- In office 16 October 2007 – 24 January 2008
- Preceded by: Vilhjálmur Þ. Vilhjálmsson
- Succeeded by: Ólafur F. Magnússon

Personal details
- Born: 19 June 1972 (age 54) Oslo, Norway
- Party: Social Democratic Alliance
- Spouse: Arna Dögg Einarsdóttir
- Children: 4

Dagur Bergþóruson Eggertsson (born 19 June 1972) is an Icelandic politician who was the Mayor of Reykjavík from 2007 to 2008 and again from 2014 to 2024. He was the vice-chairman of the Social Democratic Alliance from 2009 until 2013. He was first elected to the city council of Reykjavík in a 2002 election and became the mayor on 16 October 2007. Dagur is formally educated as a physician but also has a master's degree in Human Rights and International Law from the University of Lund in Sweden.

== Professional career ==
While studying at the University of Iceland, he was the chairman of the student council from 1994 to 1995 and managing director of the Icelandic Student Innovation Fund from 1995 to 1996. From 1995 to 1998, Dagur worked at the Icelandic National Broadcasting Service, Channel 1, making programs. He is the author of a 3-volume biography of former prime minister, Steingrímur Hermannsson, which he worked on from 1998 to 2000.

From 2000 to 2004, he worked at various divisions at Landspítali University Hospital. He worked as an assistant doctor in 2000. He worked as physician at Ísafjörður district hospital in summer 2001 and then returned to Landspítali and worked at the Department of Microbiology in 2002. From 2003 to 2004, he was a doctor at the E.R. He held lectures on public health at the Reykjavík University in the years of 2005 to 2007.

== Political career ==
Dagur was first elected to Reykjavík City Council in May 2002 as an Independent candidate within the four party coalition Reykjavíkurlistinn. From 2004 to 2006, he was the Chairman of the City Planning Council.

Dagur became Mayor of Reykjavík in October 2007 but was suddenly ousted when one of his supporters in the Reykjavík City Council, Ólafur F. Magnússon, changed sides and formed a new majority with the opposition party, becoming mayor himself.

From 2009 to 2013, he was Vice Chairman of the Social Democratic Alliance.

From 2010 to 2014, Dagur formed a majority with The Best Party with Jón Gnarr as mayor but Dagur became the chairman of the City Executive Council.

On 31 May 2014, the Social Democratic Alliance in Reykjavík, with Dagur as lead candidate, won the single largest number of votes for the Reykjavík City Council in the 2014 Icelandic municipal elections. Dagur became the mayor of Reykjavík on 16 June 2014. His tenure ended after almost a decade on 16 January 2024.

== Personal life ==
Dagur grew up the Árbær district of Reykjavík. He is the son of Eggert Gunnarsson, a veterinarian, and Bergþóra Jónsdóttir, a biochemist. Dagur is married to Arna Dögg Einarsdóttir, a medical doctor. They have four children.

Political offices
Preceded by Vilhjálmur Þ. Vilhjálmsson	Mayor of Reykjavík; 2007–2008	Succeeded by Ólafur F. Magnússon
Preceded by Jón Gnarr	Mayor of Reykjavík; 2014–2024	Succeeded by Einar Þorsteinsson
