= Vilhjálmur Þórmundur Vilhjálmsson =

Icelandic mayor (born 1946)

Mayor of Reykjavík
- In office 13 June 2006 – 16 October 2007
- Preceded by: Steinunn Óskarsdóttir
- Succeeded by: Dagur Eggertsson

Personal details
- Born: 26 April 1946 (age 80)
- Party: Independence Party

Vilhjálmur Þórmundur Vilhjálmsson (born 26 April 1946) is an Icelandic lawyer and politician who was mayor of Reykjavík 2006–2007 and was the chairman of the executive committee of the City Council of Reykjavík. He has been a member of Reykjavík's City Council since 1982.

Preceded by Steinunn V. Óskarsdóttir	Mayor of Reykjavík; 2006–2007	Succeeded by Dagur B. Eggertsson
