= Alternate director =

An alternate director is an individual who is appointed to attend a board meeting on behalf of the director of a company where the principal director would be otherwise unable to attend. The law relating to alternate directors varies from country to country, but in most jurisdictions, the alternate director has the same powers to attend, speak and vote at meetings as the principal director would have had, had the alternate not been appointed.

In some jurisdictions, the alternate must also be a director in his or her own right (so in effect, there would be one less person at the meeting, but the director who had also been appointed as an alternate would carry two votes). However such structures are not common in developed legal systems.

The appointment of a temporary alternate is one of the few exceptions to the general rule that the office of a director is not assignable and non-delegable.
