= Same-sex marriage in Iceland =

Same-sex marriage has been legal in Iceland since 27 June 2010. A bill providing for a gender-neutral marriage definition was passed 49–0 by the Althing on 11 June. It was signed by President Ólafur Ragnar Grímsson on 22 June and took effect five days later. No members of Parliament voted against the bill, and polling suggested that it was very popular among Icelanders. Iceland was the third Nordic country, after Norway and Sweden, the seventh in Europe, and the ninth in the world to legalize same-sex marriage.

Iceland has become a popular marriage destination for same-sex couples and was listed as number eight in the "Top 10 Gay Wedding Destinations" by Lonely Planet in 2014.

== Registered partnerships ==
=== Legislative action ===
Registered partnerships (Icelandic: staðfest samvist, pronounced [ˈstaːðfɛst ˈsamvɪst]) for same-sex couples were introduced in Iceland in 1996. The law was adopted by the Althing on 4 June by a vote of 44–1, and entered into force on 27 June 1996. This legislation was repealed with the passing of the gender-neutral marriage law in 2010. The legislation granted the same range of protections, responsibilities and benefits as marriage, and was only applicable to same-sex couples. All parties in the Althing were in favour of the law. Iceland was the fourth country in the world to establish registered partnerships for same-sex couples, after Denmark, Norway and Sweden.

4 June 1996 vote in the Althing
Party	Voted for	Voted against	Abstained	Absent (Did not vote)
G Independence Party	19: Árni Ragnar Árnason; Björn Bjarnason; Halldór Blöndal; Pétur Blöndal; Sturla Böðvarsson; Ólafur Garðar Einarsson; Katrín Fjeldsted; Einar Guðfinnsson; Guðjón Guðmundsson; Geir Haarde; Guðmundur Hallvarðsson; Egill Jónsson; Hjálmar Jónsson; Tómas Ingi Olrich; Kristján Pálsson; Þorsteinn Pálsson; Sólveig Pétursdóttir; Arnbjörg Sveinsdóttir; Sigríður Anna Þórðardóttir	1: Árni Johnsen	1: Árni Mathiesen	4: Vilhjálmur Egilsson; Einar Kristjánsson; Davíð Oddsson; Friðrik Klemenz Sophusson
G Progressive Party	9: Hjálmar Árnason; Guðmundur Bjarnason; Stefán Guðmundsson; Ólafur Haraldsson; Arnþrúður Karlsdóttir; Jón Kristjánsson; Ingibjörg Pálmadóttir; Magnús Stefánsson; Valgerður Sverrisdóttir	–	3: Siv Friðleifsdóttir; Páll Bragi Pétursson; Gunnlaugur Sigmundsson	3: Guðni Ágústsson; Halldór Ásgrímsson; Ísólfur Pálmason
People's Alliance	7: Ragnar Arnalds; Margrét Frímannsdóttir; Svavar Gestsson; Hjörleifur Guttormsson; Bryndís Hlöðversdóttir; Sigríður Jóhannesdóttir; Ögmundur Jónasson	–	1: Steingrímur J. Sigfússon	1: Kristinn Gunnarsson
Social Democratic Party	3: Lúðvík Bergvinsson; Gísli S. Einarsson; Guðmundur Árni Stefánsson	–	1: Össur Skarphéðinsson	3: Sighvatur Kristinn Björgvinsson; Rannveig Guðmundsdóttir; Ásta B. Þorsteinsdóttir
National Awakening	3: Ásta Ragnheiður Jóhannesdóttir; Svanfríður Jónasdóttir; Jóhanna Sigurðardóttir	–	–	1: Ágúst Einarsson
Women's List	3: Kristín Ástgeirsdóttir; Guðný Guðbjörnsdóttir; Kristín Halldórsdóttir	–	–	–
Total	44	1	6	12
Total	69.8%	1.6%	9.5%	19.0%

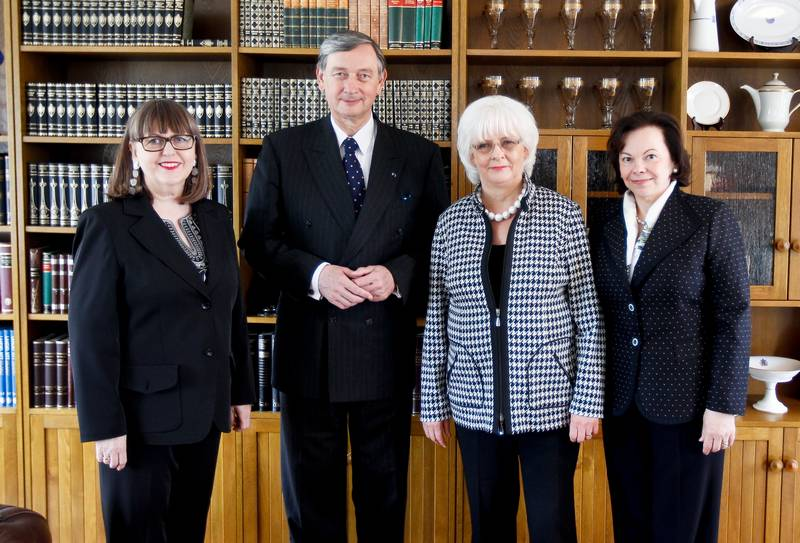
President of Slovenia Danilo Türk and Prime Minister of Iceland Jóhanna Sigurðardóttir with their respective wives, Barbara Miklič Türk (right) and Jónína Leósdóttir (left)

The Icelandic Parliament amended the registered partnership law with regards to immigration rights and adoption by a vote of 49–1 on 8 May 2000. These amendments allowed foreigners to enter into registered partnerships if they had been residing in Iceland for at least two years, and granted a person in a registered partnership the right to adopt the biological child of their partner, unless the child was adopted from a foreign country. Iceland was the second country in the world, after Denmark, to grant same-sex couples some adoption rights. On 2 June 2006, Parliament approved legislation granting same-sex couples the same rights as different-sex couples in adoption, parenting and access to assisted insemination treatment. No member of Parliament voted against the proposal, and the law came into effect on 27 June 2006. Another amendment to the partnership law, which took effect on 27 June 2008, allowed the Church of Iceland and other religious groups to bless same-sex registered partnerships.

Notable Icelandic individuals joined in a registered partnership included former Prime Minister Jóhanna Sigurðardóttir and her partner Jónína Leósdóttir. On 27 June 2010, they had their registered partnership converted into a recognized marriage.

=== Statistics ===
The rate of registered partnerships remained relatively constant over the years. According to Statistics Iceland, 12 same-sex couples entered into such partnerships in 2003. This number was 17 in 2004, 13 in 2005, 13 in 2006, 19 in 2007, and 18 in 2008.

== Same-sex marriage ==
Laws regarding same-sex partnerships in Europe¹ Marriage Civil union Limited domestic recognition (cohabitation) Unrecognized Constitution limits marriage to opposite-sex couples ¹ May include recent laws or court decisions that have not yet entered into effect.

=== Legislative action ===
The Government of Iceland, elected in April 2009, announced the introduction of a gender-neutral marriage act at some point in the future. On 19 May 2009, it publicly stated that "a single marriage act will be adopted". Though it was not explicitly stated, it implied that the act would be gender-neutral. The opposition Progressive Party also supports same-sex marriage.

On 18 November 2009, the Minister of Justice and Human Rights, Ragna Árnadóttir, confirmed that the Icelandic Government was working on a "single marriage act" which would include both opposite-sex and same-sex couples. She said the move was only "a natural and logical continuation of the progress that has already been made in improving the rights of homosexuals when it comes to the right to family life". On 23 March 2010, the government presented a bill to repeal the registered partnership law and allow couples to marry regardless of gender. The bill would amend the Marriage Act (Icelandic: Hjúskaparlög, pronounced [ˈçuːskapartlœɣ]) to define marriage as the union of "two persons", (Note: Article 1 of the Marriage Act states: Lög þessi gilda um hjúskap tveggja einstaklinga., translating to "This Act applies to the marriage of two persons.") and make all references to marriage and married spouses gender-neutral. On 11 June 2010, the Icelandic Parliament approved the bill 49 to 0, with 7 abstentions and 7 absences. The legislation was signed into law by President Ólafur Ragnar Grímsson on 22 June, and took effect on 27 June 2010. Among the first couples to marry were Prime Minister Jóhanna Sigurðardóttir and her partner on 27 June. The passage of the law made Iceland the ninth country in the world to legalize same-sex marriage, after the Netherlands, Belgium, Spain, Canada, South Africa, Norway, Sweden and Portugal.

11 June 2010 vote in the Althing
Party	Voted for	Voted against	Abstained	Absent (Did not vote)
G Social Democratic Alliance	17: Árni Páll Árnason; Mörður Árnason; Valgerður Bjarnadóttir; Anna Margrét Guðjónsdóttir; Jónína Rós Guðmundsdóttir; Guðbjartur Hannesson; Oddný G. Harðardóttir; Skúli Helgason; Helgi Hjörvar; Sigríður Ingibjörg Ingadóttir; Ásta R. Jóhannesdóttir; Róbert Marshall; Kristján L. Möller; Sigmundur Ernir Rúnarsson; Magnús Orri Schram; Össur Skarphéðinsson; Þórunn Sveinbjarnardóttir	–	2: Katrín Júlíusdóttir; Ólína Þorvarðardóttir	1: Jóhanna Sigurðardóttir
Independence Party	12: Birgir Ármannsson; Ragnheiður E. Árnadóttir; Bjarni Benediktsson; Pétur H. Blöndal; Jón Gunnarsson; Unnur Brá Konráðsdóttir; Sigurður Kári Kristjánsson; Ólöf Nordal; Ásbjörn Óttarsson; Ragnheiður Ríkharðsdóttir; Tryggvi Þór Herbertsson; Guðlaugur Þór Þórðarson	–	1: Óli Björn Kárason	3: Einar K. Guðfinnsson; Árni Johnsen; Kristján Þór Júlíusson
G Left-Green Movement	11: Þuríður Backman; Ásmundur Einar Daðason; Atli Gíslason; Björn Valur Gíslason; Katrín Jakobsdóttir; Ögmundur Jónasson; Lilja Rafney Magnúsdóttir; Lilja Mósesdóttir; Margrét Pétursdóttir; Steingrímur J. Sigfússon; Árni Þór Sigurðsson	–	3: Jón Bjarnason; Álfheiður Ingadóttir; Svandís Svavarsdóttir	–
Progressive Party	5: Eygló Harðardóttir; Birkir Jón Jónsson; Guðmundur Steingrímsson; Gunnar Bragi Sveinsson; Höskuldur Þórhallsson	–	1: Siv Friðleifsdóttir	3: Sigmundur Davíð Gunnlaugsson; Vigdís Hauksdóttir; Sigurður Ingi Jóhannsson
The Movement	3: Birgitta Jónsdóttir; Þór Saari; Margrét Tryggvadóttir	–	–	–
Independent	1: Þráinn Bertelsson	–	–	–
Total	49	0	7	7
Total	77.8%	0.0%	11.1%	11.1%

In Icelandic, same-sex marriage is known as hjónaband fólks af sama kyni or more commonly in public discourse as samkynja hjónaband (pronounced [ˈsamcʰɪnja ˈçou̯ːnaˌpant]) or hjónaband samkynhneigðra (pronounced [ˈçou̯ːnaˌpant ˈsamcʰɪnˌn̥ei̯ɣðra]).

=== Religious performance ===
In October 2015, the Church of Iceland voted to allow same-sex couples to marry in its churches. A freedom of conscience clause which would have allowed priests to decide based on religious or personal grounds whether to perform same-sex wedding ceremonies was voted down by the Church Assembly. The Bishop of Iceland, Agnes M. Sigurðardóttir, welcomed the move to perform same-sex marriages, saying "the church is primarily a channel of the love of Christ and celebrates life in all its diversity." Other smaller religious organisations also perform same-sex marriages, including Ásatrúarfélagið, which has been conducting same-sex weddings since 2003.

== Public opinion ==
A February 2000 Gallup opinion poll showed that 53% of Icelanders supported the right of same-sex couples to adopt children, 12% declared their neutrality and 35% were against the right to adopt. A June 2004 Gallup poll showed that 87% of Icelanders supported same-sex marriage. Furthermore, a Fréttablaðið opinion survey in November 2005 showed that 82% of the population supported access to assisted pregnancy for lesbian couples.

According to a 2006 Gallup poll, 89% of Icelanders supported same-sex marriage, with 11% opposed. Specifically, 66% supported both civil and religious same-sex marriages, 19% supported only civil marriages and 3% only religious marriages. Support varied by age: 92% of 18–24-year-olds were in favour of same-sex marriage, compared to 95% in the 25–34 age group, 93% in the 35–44 age group, 89% in the 45–54 age group, and 81% among those over 55.

== See also ==
- LGBT rights in Iceland
- Recognition of same-sex unions in Europe
