= List of members of the Althing, 1995–1999 =

This is a list of the members of the Iceland Althing (Parliament) from 1995 till 1999.

== Election results ==
National party	Chairperson(s)	Seats	±
Independence Party	Davíð Oddsson	25 / 63	▼1
Progressive Party	Halldór Ásgrímsson	15 / 63	▲2
People's Alliance	Ólafur Grímsson	9 / 63	0
Social Democratic Party	Jón Hannibalsson	7 / 63	▼3
National Awakening	Jóhanna Sigurðardóttir	4 / 63	—
Women's List	no designated chairperson	3 / 63	—

Source for seat distribution

== List of MPs elected on 8 April 1995 ==
Name	National party	Constituency	# of votes
Arnbjörg Sveinsdóttir	Independence Party	Eastern	
Björn Bjarnason	Independence Party	Reykjavík	
Bryndís Hlöðversdóttir	People's Alliance	Reykjavík	
Davíð Oddsson	Independence Party	Reykjavík	
Egill Jónsson	Independence Party	Eastern	
Einar Guðfinnsson	Independence Party	Westfjords	
Einar Kristjánsson	Independence Party	Westfjords	
Finnur Ingólfsson	Progressive Party	Reykjavík	
Friðrik Sophusson	Independence Party	Reykjavík	
Geir Haarde	Independence Party	Reykjavík	
Gunnlaugur Sigmundsson	Progressive Party	Westfjords	
Guðjón Guðmundsson	Independence Party	Western	
Guðmundur Bjarnason	Progressive Party	Northeastern	
Guðmundur Hallvarðsson	Independence Party	Reykjavík	
Guðmundur Stefánsson	Social Democratic Party	Reykjanes	
Guðni Ágústsson	Progressive Party	Southern	
Guðný Guðbjörnsdóttir	Women's List	Reykjavík	
Gísli Einarsson	Social Democratic Party	Western	
Halldór Blöndal	Independence Party	Northeastern	
Halldór Ásgrímsson	Progressive Party	Eastern	
Hjálmar Árnason	Progressive Party	Reykjanes	
Hjálmar Jónsson	Independence Party	Northwestern	
Hjörleifur Guttormsson	People's Alliance	Eastern	
Ingibjörg Pálmadóttir	Progressive Party	Western	
Jóhanna Sigurðardóttir	National Awakening	Reykjavík	
Jón Hannibalsson	Social Democratic Party	Reykjavík	
Jón Kristjánsson	Progressive Party	Eastern	
Kristinn Gunnarsson	People's Alliance	Westfjords	
Kristján Pálsson	Independence Party	Reykjanes	
Kristín Halldórsdóttir	Women's List	Reykjanes	
Kristín Ástgeirsdóttir	Women's List	Reykjavík	
Lára Ragnarsdóttir	Independence Party	Reykjavík	
Lúðvík Bergvinsson	Social Democratic Party	Southern	
Magnús Stefánsson	Progressive Party	Western	
Margrét Frímannsdóttir	People's Alliance	Southern	
Páll Pétursson	Progressive Party	Northwestern	
Pétur Blöndal	Independence Party	Reykjavík	
Ragnar Arnalds	People's Alliance	Northwestern	
Rannveig Guðmundsdóttir	Social Democratic Party	Reykjanes	
Sighvatur Björgvinsson	Social Democratic Party	Westfjords	
Sigríður Þórðardóttir	Independence Party	Reykjanes	
Siv Friðleifsdóttir	Progressive Party	Reykjanes	
Stefán Guðmundsson	Progressive Party	Northwestern	
Steingrímur Sigfússon	People's Alliance	Northeastern	
Sturla Böðvarsson	Independence Party	Western	
Svanfríður Jónasdóttir	National Awakening	Northeastern	
Svavar Gestsson	People's Alliance	Reykjavík	
Sólveig Pétursdóttir	Independence Party	Reykjavík	
Tómas Olrich	Independence Party	Northeastern	
Valgerður Sverrisdóttir	Progressive Party	Northeastern	
Vilhjálmur Egilsson	Independence Party	Northwestern	
Ágúst Einarsson	National Awakening	Reykjanes	
Árni Ragnar Árnason	Independence Party	Reykjanes	
Árni Johnsen	Independence Party	Southern	
Árni Mathiesen	Independence Party	Reykjanes	
Ásta Jóhannesdóttir	National Awakening	Reykjavík	
Ísólfur Pálmason	Progressive Party	Southern	
Ólafur Einarsson	Independence Party	Reykjanes	
Ólafur Grímsson	People's Alliance	Reykjanes	
Ólafur Haraldsson	Progressive Party	Reykjavík	
Ögmundur Jónasson	People's Alliance	Reykjavík	
Össur Skarphéðinsson	Social Democratic Party	Reykjavík	
Þorsteinn Pálsson	Independence Party	Southern	
