= List of members of the Althing, 1999–2003 =

This is a list of the members of the Iceland Althing (Parliament) from 1999 till 2003.

== Election results ==
National party	Chairperson(s)	Seats	±
Independence Party	Davíð Oddsson	26 / 63	▲1
Social Democratic Alliance	Margrét Frímannsdóttir	17 / 63	—
Progressive Party	Halldór Ásgrímsson	12 / 63	▼3
Left-Green Movement	Steingrímur Sigfússon	6 / 63	▲6
Liberal Party	Sverrir Hermannsson	2 / 63	—

== List of MPs elected on 18 May 1999 ==
Name	National party	Constituency	# of votes
Arnbjörg Sveinsdóttir	Independence Party	Eastern	
Björn Bjarnason	Independence Party	Reykjavík	
Bryndís Hlöðversdóttir	Social Democratic Alliance	Reykjavík	
Davíð Oddsson	Independence Party	Reykjavík	
Drífa Hjartardóttir	Independence Party	Southern	
Einar Guðfinnsson	Independence Party	Westfjords	
Einar Kristjánsson	Independence Party	Westfjords	
Einar Sigurðsson	Social Democratic Alliance	Eastern	
Finnur Ingólfsson (Note: Replaced by Jónína Bjartmarz in 2000.)	Progressive Party	Reykjavík	
Geir Haarde	Independence Party	Reykjavík	
Gunnar Birgisson	Independence Party	Reykjanes	
Guðjón Guðmundsson	Independence Party	Western	
Guðjón Kristjánsson	Liberal Party	Westfjords	
Guðmundur Hallvarðsson	Independence Party	Reykjavík	
Guðmundur Stefánsson	Social Democratic Alliance	Reykjanes	
Guðni Ágústsson	Progressive Party	Southern	
Guðrún Ögmundsdóttir	Social Democratic Alliance	Reykjavík	
Gísli Einarsson	Social Democratic Alliance	Western	
Halldór Blöndal	Independence Party	Northeastern	
Halldór Ásgrímsson	Progressive Party	Eastern	
Hjálmar Jónsson (Note: Replaced by Sigríður Ingvarsdóttir in 2001.)	Independence Party	Northwestern	
Hjálmar Árnason	Progressive Party	Reykjanes	
Ingibjörg Pálmadóttir (Note: Replaced by Magnús Stefánsson in 2001.)	Progressive Party	Western	
Jóhann Ársælsson	Social Democratic Alliance	Western	
Jóhanna Sigurðardóttir	Social Democratic Alliance	Reykjavík	
Jón Bjarnason	Left-Green Movement	Northwestern	
Jón Kristjánsson	Progressive Party	Eastern	
Katrín Fjeldsted	Independence Party	Reykjavík	
Kolbrún Halldórsdóttir	Left-Green Movement	Reykjavík	
Kristinn Gunnarsson	Progressive Party	Westfjords	
Kristján Möller	Social Democratic Alliance	Northwestern	
Kristján Pálsson	Independence Party	Reykjanes	
Lára Ragnarsdóttir	Independence Party	Reykjavík	
Lúðvík Bergvinsson	Social Democratic Alliance	Southern	
Margrét Frímannsdóttir	Social Democratic Alliance	Southern	
Páll Pétursson	Progressive Party	Northwestern	
Pétur Blöndal	Independence Party	Reykjavík	
Rannveig Guðmundsdóttir	Social Democratic Alliance	Reykjanes	
Sighvatur Björgvinsson (Note: Replaced by Karl Matthíasson in 2001.)	Social Democratic Alliance	Westfjords	
Sigríður Jóhannesdóttir	Social Democratic Alliance	Reykjanes	
Sigríður Þórðardóttir	Independence Party	Reykjanes	
Siv Friðleifsdóttir	Progressive Party	Reykjanes	
Steingrímur Sigfússon	Left-Green Movement	Northeastern	
Sturla Böðvarsson	Independence Party	Western	
Svanfríður Jónasdóttir	Social Democratic Alliance	Northeastern	
Sverrir Hermannsson	Liberal Party	Reykjavík	
Sólveig Pétursdóttir	Independence Party	Reykjavík	
Tómas Olrich	Independence Party	Northeastern	
Valgerður Sverrisdóttir	Progressive Party	Northeastern	
Vilhjálmur Egilsson (Note: Replaced by Adolf Berndsen in 2003.)	Independence Party	Northwestern	
Árni Ragnar Árnason	Independence Party	Reykjanes	
Árni Jóhannsson	Left-Green Movement	Northeastern	
Árni Johnsen (Note: Replaced by Kjartan Ólafsson in 2001.)	Independence Party	Southern	
Árni Mathiesen	Independence Party	Reykjanes	
Ásta Jóhannesdóttir	Social Democratic Alliance	Reykjavík	
Ásta Möller	Independence Party	Reykjavík	
Ísólfur Pálmason	Progressive Party	Southern	
Ólafur Haraldsson	Progressive Party	Reykjavík	
Ögmundur Jónasson	Left-Green Movement	Reykjavík	
Össur Skarphéðinsson	Social Democratic Alliance	Reykjavík	
Þorgerður Gunnarsdóttir	Independence Party	Reykjanes	
Þuríður Backman	Left-Green Movement	Eastern	
Þórunn Sveinbjarnardóttir	Social Democratic Alliance	Reykjanes	
