= Reykjanes (Althing constituency) =

Former constituency of the Althing, the national legislature of Iceland

- Former Constituency for the Althing
- Althing constituencies between 1959 and 2003
- Municipality: List: Bessastaðahreppur; Garðabær; Gerðahreppur; Grindavík; Hafnarfjörður; Kjósarhreppur; Kópavogur; Mosfellsbær; Reykjanesbær; Sandgerði; Seltjarnarnes; Vatnsleysustrandarhreppur
- Region: Capital; Southern Peninsula

Former Constituency
- Created: 1959
- Abolished: 2003
- Seats: List (Note: Excludes compensatory seats.): 9 (1987–2003); 5 (1959–1987)
- Created from: List: Gullbringu and Kjósarsýsla; Hafnarfjörður
- Replaced by: List: South; Southwest

Reykjanes was one of the multi-member constituencies of the Althing, the national legislature of Iceland. The constituency was established in 1959 following the nationwide extension of proportional representation for elections to the Althing. It was abolished in 2003 following the re-organisation of constituencies across Iceland when it was split between the new South and Southwest constituencies. Reykjanes was conterminous with the Capital (excluding Reykjavík Municipality which had its own constituency) and Southern Peninsula regions.

== Election results ==
=== Summary ===
Election	People's Alliance G			Left-Green U			Social Democrats S / A			Progressive B			Independence D		
Election	Votes	%	Seats	Votes	%	Seats	Votes	%	Seats	Votes	%	Seats	Votes	%	Seats
1999				2,629	5.86%	0	12,594	28.07%	3	7,190	16.03%	1	20,033	44.66%	5
1995	5,330	12.73%	1				6,603	15.77%	2	8,810	21.04%	2	16,431	39.24%	4
1991	4,458	11.49%	1				9,025	23.25%	2	5,386	13.88%	1	15,851	40.84%	4
1987	4,172	11.73%	1				6,476	18.21%	2	7,043	19.80%	2	10,283	28.91%	3
1983	3,984	13.77%	1				4,289	14.83%	1	3,444	11.91%	0	12,779	44.18%	3
1979	4,679	18.29%	1				6,187	24.18%	1	4,430	17.32%	1	10,194	39.85%	2
1978	5,319	21.47%	1				7,293	29.44%	2	2,628	10.61%	0	8,161	32.95%	2
1974	3,747	18.09%	1				2,702	13.04%	0	3,682	17.77%	1	9,751	47.07%	3
1971	3,056	17.12%	1				2,620	14.68%	1	3,587	20.09%	1	6,492	36.37%	2
1967	2,194	14.72%	1				3,191	21.42%	1	3,529	23.68%	1	5,363	35.99%	2
1963	1,969	16.04%	1				2,804	22.84%	1	2,465	20.08%	1	5,040	41.05%	2
1959 Oct	1,703	15.47%	1				2,911	26.45%	1	1,760	15.99%	1	4,338	39.41%	2

(Excludes compensatory seats.)

=== Detailed ===
==== 1990s ====
===== 1999 =====
Results of the 1999 parliamentary election held on 8 May 1999:

Party		Votes	%	Seats		
Party		Votes	%	Con.	Com.	Tot.
Independence Party	D	20,033	44.66%	5	1	6
Social Democratic Alliance	S	12,594	28.07%	3	1	4
Progressive Party	B	7,190	16.03%	1	1	2
Left-Green Movement	U	2,629	5.86%	0	0	0
Liberal Party	F	2,076	4.63%	0	0	0
Christian Democratic Party	K	173	0.39%	0	0	0
Humanist Party	H	165	0.37%	0	0	0
Valid votes		44,860	100.00%	9	3	12
Blank votes		914	1.99%			
Rejected votes – other		110	0.24%			
Total polled		45,884	83.91%			
Registered electors		54,681				

The following candidates were elected:

- Constituency seats - Árni Mathiesen (D), 19,870 votes; Gunnar Birgisson (D), 19,645 votes; Guðmundur Árni Stefánsson (S), 12,391 votes; Kristján Pálsson (D), 19,968 votes; Rannveig Guðmundsdóttir (S), 12,510 votes; Sigríður Jóhannesdóttir (S), 12,542 votes; Sigríður Anna Þórðardóttir (D), 19,966 votes; Siv Friðleifsdóttir (B), 7,146 votes; and Þorgerður Katrín Gunnarsdóttir (D), 19,987 votes.
- Compensatory seats - Árni Ragnar Árnason (D), 19,996 votes; Hjálmar Árnason (B), 7,174 votes; and Þórunn Sveinbjarnardóttir (S), 12,558 votes.

===== 1995 =====
Results of the 1995 parliamentary election held on 8 April 1995:

Party		Votes	%	Seats		
Party		Votes	%	Con.	Com.	Tot.
Independence Party	D	16,431	39.24%	4	1	5
Progressive Party	B	8,810	21.04%	2	0	2
Social Democratic Party	A	6,603	15.77%	2	0	2
People's Alliance	G	5,330	12.73%	1	0	1
National Awakening	J	2,545	6.08%	0	1	1
Women's List	V	1,761	4.21%	0	1	1
Natural Law Party	N	276	0.66%	0	0	0
Christian Political Movement	K	114	0.27%	0	0	0
Valid votes		41,870	100.00%	9	3	12
Blank votes		597	1.40%			
Rejected votes – other		101	0.24%			
Total polled		42,568	87.66%			
Registered electors		48,558				

The following candidates were elected:

- Constituency seats - Árni Mathiesen (D), 16,302 votes; Árni Ragnar Árnason (D), 16,355 votes; Guðmundur Árni Stefánsson (A), 6,079 votes; Hjálmar Árnason (B), 8,762 votes; Ólafur Garðar Einarsson (D), 14,932 votes; Ólafur Ragnar Grímsson (G), 5,266 votes; Rannveig Guðmundsdóttir (A), 6,475 votes; Sigríður Anna Þórðardóttir (D), 16,342 votes; and Siv Friðleifsdóttir (B), 8,761 votes.
- Compensatory seats - Ágúst Einarsson (J), 2,504 votes; Kristín Halldórsdóttir (V), 1,761 votes; and Kristján Pálsson (D), 16,305 votes.

===== 1991 =====
Results of the 1991 parliamentary election held on 20 April 1991:

Party		Votes	%	Seats		
Party		Votes	%	Con.	Com.	Tot.
Independence Party	D	15,851	40.84%	4	1	5
Social Democratic Party	A	9,025	23.25%	2	1	3
Progressive Party	B	5,386	13.88%	1	0	1
People's Alliance	G	4,458	11.49%	1	0	1
Women's List	V	2,698	6.95%	1	0	1
Alliance of Social Democratic Extremists	T	459	1.18%	0	0	0
National Party and Humanist Party	Þ	319	0.82%	0	0	0
Liberals	F	315	0.81%	0	0	0
Green Movement	Z	112	0.29%	0	0	0
Workers' Party of Iceland	E	99	0.26%	0	0	0
Home Rule Association	H	88	0.23%	0	0	0
Valid votes		38,810	100.00%	9	2	11
Blank votes		397	1.01%			
Rejected votes – other		39	0.10%			
Total polled		39,246	88.47%			
Registered electors		44,360				

The following candidates were elected:

- Constituency seats - Anna Ólafsdóttir Björnsson (V), 2,694 votes; Árni Mathiesen (D), 15,751 votes; Árni Ragnar Árnason (D), 15,756 votes; Jón Sigurðsson (A), 9,008 votes; Karl Steinar Guðnason (A), 8,981 votes; Ólafur Garðar Einarsson (D), 15,703 votes; Ólafur Ragnar Grímsson (G), 4,417 votes; Salome Þorkelsdóttir (D), 15,719 votes; and Steingrímur Hermannsson (B), 5,386 votes.
- Compensatory seats - Rannveig Guðmundsdóttir (A), 9,007 votes; and Sigríður Anna Þórðardóttir (D), 15,830 votes.

==== 1980s ====
===== 1987 =====
Results of the 1987 parliamentary election held on 25 April 1987:

Party		Votes	%	Seats		
Party		Votes	%	Con.	Com.	Tot.
Independence Party	D	10,283	28.91%	3	0	3
Progressive Party	B	7,043	19.80%	2	0	2
Social Democratic Party	A	6,476	18.21%	2	0	2
People's Alliance	G	4,172	11.73%	1	0	1
Citizens' Party	S	3,876	10.90%	1	1	2
Women's List	V	3,220	9.05%	0	1	1
Humanist Party	M	411	1.16%	0	0	0
Alliance of Social Democrats	C	84	0.24%	0	0	0
Valid votes		35,565	100.00%	9	2	11
Blank votes		288	0.80%			
Rejected votes – other		44	0.12%			
Total polled		35,897	91.22%			
Registered electors		39,354				

The following candidates were elected:

- Constituency seats - Geir Gunnarsson (G), 4,141 votes; Jóhann Einvarðsson (B), 6,980 votes; Júlíus Sólnes (S), 3,863 votes; Karl Steinar Guðnason (A), 6,430 votes; Kjartan Jóhannsson (A), 6,444 votes; Matthías Árni Mathiesen (D), 10,128 votes; Ólafur Garðar Einarsson (D), 10,147 votes; Salome Þorkelsdóttir (D), 10,196 votes; and Steingrímur Hermannsson (B), 7,042 votes.
- Compensatory seats - Hreggviður Jónsson (S), 3,870 votes; and Kristín Halldórsdóttir (V), 3,218 votes.

===== 1983 =====
Results of the 1983 parliamentary election held on 23 April 1983:

Party		Votes	%	Seats		
Party		Votes	%	Con.	Com.	Tot.
Independence Party	D	12,779	44.18%	3	1	4
Social Democratic Party	A	4,289	14.83%	1	1	2
People's Alliance	G	3,984	13.77%	1	0	1
Progressive Party	B	3,444	11.91%	0	0	0
Alliance of Social Democrats	C	2,345	8.11%	0	1	1
Women's List	V	2,086	7.21%	0	1	1
Valid votes		28,927	100.00%	5	4	9
Blank votes		581	1.97%			
Rejected votes – other		41	0.14%			
Total polled		29,549	89.22%			
Registered electors		33,121				

The following candidates were elected:

- Constituency seats - Geir Gunnarsson (G), 3,984 votes; Gunnar G. Schram (D), 11,491 votes; Kjartan Jóhannsson (A), 4,288 votes; Matthías Árni Mathiesen (D), 12,753 votes; and Salome Þorkelsdóttir (D), 10,219 votes.
- Compensatory seats - Guðmundur Einarsson (C), 2,345 votes; Karl Steinar Guðnason (A), 3,860 votes; Kristín Halldórsdóttir (V), 2,086 votes; and Ólafur Garðar Einarsson (D), 8,937 votes.

==== 1970s ====
===== 1979 =====
Results of the 1979 parliamentary election held on 2 and 3 December 1979:

Party		Votes	%	Seats		
Party		Votes	%	Con.	Com.	Tot.
Independence Party	D	10,194	39.85%	2	1	3
Social Democratic Party	A	6,187	24.18%	1	1	2
People's Alliance	G	4,679	18.29%	1	0	1
Progressive Party	B	4,430	17.32%	1	0	1
The Sunshine Party	Q	92	0.36%	0	0	0
Valid votes		25,582	100.00%	5	2	7
Blank votes		654	2.49%			
Rejected votes – other		39	0.15%			
Total polled		26,275	89.04%			
Registered electors		29,510				

The following candidates were elected:

- Constituency seats - Geir Gunnarsson (G), 4,679 votes; Jóhann Einvarðsson (B), 4,430 votes; Kjartan Jóhannsson (A), 6,187 votes; Matthías Árni Mathiesen (D), 10,170 votes; and Ólafur Garðar Einarsson (D), 9,165 votes.
- Compensatory seats - Karl Steinar Guðnason (A), 5,568 votes; and Salome Þorkelsdóttir (D), 8,154 votes.

===== 1978 =====
Results of the 1978 parliamentary election held on 25 June 1978:

Party		Votes	%	Seats		
Party		Votes	%	Con.	Com.	Tot.
Independence Party	D	8,161	32.95%	2	1	3
Social Democratic Party	A	7,293	29.44%	2	1	3
People's Alliance	G	5,319	21.47%	1	1	2
Progressive Party	B	2,628	10.61%	0	0	0
Independent Voters	V	592	2.39%	0	0	0
Union of Liberals and Leftists	F	574	2.32%	0	0	0
The Political Party	S	202	0.82%	0	0	0
Valid votes		24,769	100.00%	5	3	8
Blank votes		308	1.23%			
Rejected votes – other		57	0.23%			
Total polled		25,134	90.86%			
Registered electors		27,663				

The following candidates were elected:

- Constituency seats - Gils Guðmundsson (G), 5,315 votes; Karl Steinar Guðnason (A), 6,551 votes; Kjartan Jóhannsson (A), 7,241 votes; Matthías Árni Mathiesen (D), 8,066 votes; and Oddur Ólafsson (D), 7,337 votes.
- Compensatory seats - Geir Gunnarsson (G), 4,787 votes; Gunnlaugur Stefánsson (A), 5,776 votes; and Ólafur Garðar Einarsson (D), 6,525 votes.

===== 1974 =====
Results of the 1974 parliamentary election held on 30 June 1974:

Party		Votes	%	Seats		
Party		Votes	%	Con.	Com.	Tot.
Independence Party	D	9,751	47.07%	3	1	4
People's Alliance	G	3,747	18.09%	1	1	2
Progressive Party	B	3,682	17.77%	1	0	1
Social Democratic Party	A	2,702	13.04%	0	1	1
Union of Liberals and Leftists	F	764	3.69%	0	0	0
Revolutionary Communist League	R	51	0.25%	0	0	0
Democratic Party	P	19	0.09%	0	0	0
Valid votes		20,716	100.00%	5	3	8
Blank votes		200	0.95%			
Rejected votes – other		72	0.34%			
Total polled		20,988	91.21%			
Registered electors		23,011				

The following candidates were elected:

- Constituency seats - Gils Guðmundsson (G), 3,745 votes; Jón Skaftason (B), 3,656 votes; Matthías Árni Mathiesen (D), 9,719 votes; Oddur Ólafsson (D), 8,770 votes; and Ólafur Garðar Einarsson (D), 7,796 votes.
- Compensatory seats - Axel Jónsson (D), 2,438 votes; Geir Gunnarsson (G), 1,874 votes; and Jón Ármann Héðinsson (A), 2,702 votes.

===== 1971 =====
Results of the 1971 parliamentary election held on 13 June 1971:

Party		Votes	%	Seats		
Party		Votes	%	Con.	Com.	Tot.
Independence Party	D	6,492	36.37%	2	1	3
Progressive Party	B	3,587	20.09%	1	0	1
People's Alliance	G	3,056	17.12%	1	1	2
Social Democratic Party	A	2,620	14.68%	1	1	2
Union of Liberals and Leftists	F	1,517	8.50%	0	0	0
Candidature Party	O	579	3.24%	0	0	0
Valid votes		17,851	100.00%	5	3	8
Blank votes		245	1.35%			
Rejected votes – other		39	0.22%			
Total polled		18,135	90.22%			
Registered electors		20,100				

The following candidates were elected:

- Constituency seats - Gils Guðmundsson (G), 3,046 votes; Jón Skaftason (B), 3,574 votes; Jón Ármann Héðinsson (A), 2,595 votes; Matthías Árni Mathiesen (D), 6,417 votes; and Oddur Ólafsson (D), 5,819 votes.
- Compensatory seats - Geir Gunnarsson (G), 1,528 votes; Ólafur Garðar Einarsson (D), 2,164 votes; and Stefán Gunnlaugsson (A), 1,310 votes.

==== 1960s ====
===== 1967 =====
Results of the 1967 parliamentary election held on 11 June 1967:

Party		Votes	%	Seats		
Party		Votes	%	Con.	Com.	Tot.
Independence Party	D	5,363	35.99%	2	1	3
Progressive Party	B	3,529	23.68%	1	0	1
Social Democratic Party	A	3,191	21.42%	1	1	2
People's Alliance	G	2,194	14.72%	1	1	2
Independent Democratic Party	H	623	4.18%	0	0	0
Valid votes		14,900	100.00%	5	3	8
Blank votes		261	1.72%			
Rejected votes – other		52	0.34%			
Total polled		15,213	90.95%			
Registered electors		16,726				

The following candidates were elected:

- Constituency seats - Emil Jónsson (A), 3,189 votes; Gils Guðmundsson (G), 2,189 votes; Jón Skaftason (B), 3,522 votes; Matthías Árni Mathiesen (D), 5,330 votes; and Pétur Benediktsson (D), 4,809 votes.
- Compensatory seats - Geir Gunnarsson (G), 1,097 votes; Jón Ármann Héðinsson (A), 1,596 votes; and Sverrir Júlíusson (D), 1,788 votes.

===== 1963 =====
Results of the 1963 parliamentary election held on 9 June 1963:

Party		Votes	%	Seats		
Party		Votes	%	Con.	Com.	Tot.
Independence Party	D	5,040	41.05%	2	1	3
Social Democratic Party	A	2,804	22.84%	1	1	2
Progressive Party	B	2,465	20.08%	1	0	1
People's Alliance	G	1,969	16.04%	1	1	2
Valid votes		12,278	100.00%	5	3	8
Blank votes		230	1.83%			
Rejected votes – other		40	0.32%			
Total polled		12,548	91.23%			
Registered electors		13,754				

The following candidates were elected:

- Constituency seats - Emil Jónsson (A), 2,804 votes; Gils Guðmundsson (G), 1,963 votes; Jón Skaftason (B), 2,465 votes; Matthías Árni Mathiesen (D), 4,536 votes; Ólafur Thors (D), 5,038 votes.
- Compensatory seats - Geir Gunnarsson (G), 985 votes; Guðmundur Ívarsson Guðmundsson (A), 1,402 votes; and Sverrir Júlíusson (D), 1,680 votes.

==== 1950s ====
===== October 1959 =====
Results of the October 1959 parliamentary election held on 25 and 26 October 1959:

Party		Votes	%	Seats		
Party		Votes	%	Con.	Com.	Tot.
Independence Party	D	4,338	39.41%	2	1	3
Social Democratic Party	A	2,911	26.45%	1	1	2
Progressive Party	B	1,760	15.99%	1	0	1
People's Alliance	G	1,703	15.47%	1	1	2
National Preservation Party	F	295	2.68%	0	0	0
Valid votes		11,007	100.00%	5	3	8
Blank votes		145	1.30%			
Rejected votes – other		20	0.18%			
Total polled		11,172	92.01%			
Registered electors		12,142				

The following candidates were elected:

- Constituency seats - Emil Jónsson (A), 2,910 votes; Finnbogi Rútur Valdimarsson (G), 1,702 votes; Jón Skaftason (B), 1,760 votes; Matthías Árni Mathiesen (D), 3,903 votes; and Ólafur Thors (D), 4,333 votes.
- Compensatory seats - Alfreð Gíslason (D), 1.446 votes; Geir Gunnarsson (G), 852 votes; and Guðmundur Ívarsson Guðmundsson (A), 1,456 votes.
