= Southern (Althing constituency) =

Former constituency of the Althing, the national legislature of Iceland

- Suðurland
- Former Constituency for the Althing
- Althing constituencies between 1959 and 2003
- Municipality: List: Ásahreppur; Austur-Eyjafjallahreppur; Austur-Landeyjahreppur; Biskupstungnahreppur; Djúpárhreppur; Fljótshlíðarhreppur; Gaulverjabæjarhreppur; Gnúpverjahreppur; Grímsnes-og Grafningshreppur; Holta- og Landsveit; Hraungerðishreppur; Hrunamannahreppur; Hveragerði; Hvolhreppur; Laugardalshreppur; Mýrdalshreppur; Rangárvallahreppur; Skaftárhreppur; Skeiðahreppur; Sveitarfélagið Árborg; Sveitarfélagið Ölfus; Vestmannaeyjar; Vestur-Eyjafjallahreppur; Vestur-Landeyjahreppur; Villingaholtshreppur; Þingvallahreppur
- Region: Southern

Former Constituency
- Created: 1959
- Abolished: 2003
- Seats: List (Note: Excludes compensatory seats.): 5 (1987–2003); 6 (1959–1987)
- Created from: List: Árnessýsla; Rangárvallasýsla; Vestmannaeyjar; West Skaftafellssýsla
- Replaced by: South

Southern (Icelandic: Suðurland) was one of the multi-member constituencies of the Althing, the national legislature of Iceland. The constituency was established in 1959 following the nationwide extension of proportional representation for elections to the Althing. It was abolished in 2003 following the re-organisation of constituencies across Iceland when it was merged with the municipalities of Gerðahreppur, Grindavík, Reykjanesbær, Sandgerði and Vatnsleysustrandarhreppur from the Reykjanes constituency and the municipality of Sveitarfélagið Hornafjörður from the Eastern constituency to form the South constituency. Southern was conterminous with the Southern region.

== Election results ==
=== Summary ===
Election	People's Alliance G			Left-Green U			Social Democrats S / A			Progressive B			Independence D		
Election	Votes	%	Seats	Votes	%	Seats	Votes	%	Seats	Votes	%	Seats	Votes	%	Seats
1999				362	2.88%	0	3,612	28.73%	1	3,669	29.18%	2	4,528	36.02%	2
1995	2,043	15.75%	1				877	6.76%	0	3,766	29.04%	2	4,310	33.23%	2
1991	2,323	18.54%	1				1,079	8.61%	0	3,456	27.58%	2	4,577	36.53%	2
1987	1,428	11.51%	1				1,320	10.64%	0	3,335	26.88%	2	4,032	32.50%	2
1983	1,529	14.53%	1				1,278	12.15%	0	2,944	27.98%	2	4,202	39.94%	3
1979	1,544	14.92%	1				1,535	14.83%	1	3,357	32.44%	2	2,428	23.46%	1
1978	1,979	19.51%	1				1,743	17.18%	1	2,462	24.27%	2	3,275	32.29%	2
1974	1,369	14.40%	1				568	5.98%	0	3,213	33.80%	2	4,057	42.68%	3
1971	1,392	15.02%	1				739	7.97%	0	3,052	32.93%	2	3,601	38.86%	3
1967	1,123	13.19%	1				754	8.86%	0	3,057	35.91%	2	3,578	42.03%	3
1963	955	11.77%	0				760	9.36%	0	2,999	36.95%	3	3,402	41.92%	3
1959 Oct	1,053	13.52%	1				691	8.87%	0	2,810	36.08%	2	3,234	41.53%	3

(Excludes compensatory seats.)

=== Detailed ===
==== 1990s ====
===== 1999 =====
Results of the 1999 parliamentary election held on 8 May 1999:

Party		Votes	%	Seats		
Party		Votes	%	Con.	Com.	Tot.
Independence Party	D	4,528	36.02%	2	0	2
Progressive Party	B	3,669	29.18%	2	0	2
Social Democratic Alliance	S	3,612	28.73%	1	1	2
Left-Green Movement	U	362	2.88%	0	0	0
Liberal Party	F	358	2.85%	0	0	0
Humanist Party	H	43	0.34%	0	0	0
Valid votes		12,572	100.00%	5	1	6
Blank votes		206	1.61%			
Rejected votes – other		31	0.24%			
Total polled		12,809	88.65%			
Registered electors		14,449				

The following candidates were elected:

- Constituency seats - Árni Johnsen (D), 4,269 votes; Drífa Hjartardóttir (D), 4,392 votes; Guðni Ágústsson (B), 3,652 votes; Ísólfur Gylfi Pálmason (B), 3,639 votes; and Margrét Frímannsdóttir (S), 3,593 votes.
- Compensatory seats - Lúðvík Bergvinsson (S), 3,605 votes.

===== 1995 =====
Results of the 1995 parliamentary election held on 8 April 1995:

Party		Votes	%	Seats		
Party		Votes	%	Con.	Com.	Tot.
Independence Party	D	4,310	33.23%	2	0	2
Progressive Party	B	3,766	29.04%	2	0	2
People's Alliance	G	2,043	15.75%	1	0	1
South List	S	1,105	8.52%	0	0	0
Social Democratic Party	A	877	6.76%	0	1	1
National Awakening	J	524	4.04%	0	0	0
Women's List	V	294	2.27%	0	0	0
Natural Law Party	N	50	0.39%	0	0	0
Valid votes		12,969	100.00%	5	1	6
Blank votes		168	1.28%			
Rejected votes – other		29	0.22%			
Total polled		13,166	90.86%			
Registered electors		14,490				

The following candidates were elected:

- Constituency seats - Árni Johnsen (D), 4,218 votes; Guðni Ágústsson (B), 3,724 votes; Ísólfur Gylfi Pálmason (B), 3,761 votes; Margrét Frímannsdóttir (G), 2,038 votes; and Þorsteinn Pálsson (D), 4,254 votes.
- Compensatory seats - Lúðvík Bergvinsson (A), 874 votes.

===== 1991 =====
Results of the 1991 parliamentary election held on 20 April 1991:

Party		Votes	%	Seats		
Party		Votes	%	Con.	Com.	Tot.
Independence Party	D	4,577	36.53%	2	1	3
Progressive Party	B	3,456	27.58%	2	0	2
People's Alliance	G	2,323	18.54%	1	0	1
Social Democratic Party	A	1,079	8.61%	0	0	0
Liberals	F	468	3.74%	0	0	0
Women's List	V	467	3.73%	0	0	0
National Party and Humanist Party	Þ	126	1.01%	0	0	0
Home Rule Association	H	33	0.26%	0	0	0
Valid votes		12,529	100.00%	5	1	6
Blank votes		171	1.34%			
Rejected votes – other		27	0.21%			
Total polled		12,727	91.21%			
Registered electors		13,953				

The following candidates were elected:

- Constituency seats - Árni Johnsen (D), 4,491 votes; Guðni Ágústsson (B), 3,449 votes; Jón Helgason (B), 3,399 votes; Margrét Frímannsdóttir (G), 2,318 votes; and Þorsteinn Pálsson (D), 4,533 votes.
- Compensatory seats - Eggert Haukdal (D), 4,492 votes.

==== 1980s ====
===== 1987 =====
Results of the 1987 parliamentary election held on 25 April 1987:

Party		Votes	%	Seats		
Party		Votes	%	Con.	Com.	Tot.
Independence Party	D	4,032	32.50%	2	0	2
Progressive Party	B	3,335	26.88%	2	0	2
People's Alliance	G	1,428	11.51%	1	0	1
Citizens' Party	S	1,353	10.91%	0	1	1
Social Democratic Party	A	1,320	10.64%	0	0	0
Women's List	V	816	6.58%	0	0	0
Humanist Party	M	122	0.98%	0	0	0
Valid votes		12,406	100.00%	5	1	6
Blank votes		135	1.07%			
Rejected votes – other		30	0.24%			
Total polled		12,571	92.38%			
Registered electors		13,608				

The following candidates were elected:

- Constituency seats - Eggert Haukdal (D), 3,486 votes; Guðni Ágústsson (B), 3,323 votes; Jón Helgason (B), 3,217 votes; Margrét Frímannsdóttir (G), 1,423 votes; and Þorsteinn Pálsson (D), 3,900 votes.
- Compensatory seats - Óli Þ. Guðbjartsson (S), 1,345 votes.

===== 1983 =====
Results of the 1983 parliamentary election held on 23 April 1983:

Party		Votes	%	Seats		
Party		Votes	%	Con.	Com.	Tot.
Independence Party	D	4,202	39.94%	3	0	3
Progressive Party	B	2,944	27.98%	2	0	2
People's Alliance	G	1,529	14.53%	1	0	1
Social Democratic Party	A	1,278	12.15%	0	0	0
Alliance of Social Democrats	C	568	5.40%	0	0	0
Valid votes		10,521	100.00%	6	0	6
Blank votes		363	3.32%			
Rejected votes – other		41	0.38%			
Total polled		10,925	89.33%			
Registered electors		12,230				

The following candidates were elected:

- Constituency seats - Árni Johnsen (D), 3,809 votes; Eggert Haukdal (D), 3,486 votes; Garðar Sigurðsson (G), 1,493 votes; Jón Helgason (B), 2,699 votes; Þórarinn Sigurjónsson (B), 2,938 votes; and Þorsteinn Pálsson (D), 4,187 votes.

==== 1970s ====
===== 1979 =====
Results of the 1979 parliamentary election held on 2 and 3 December 1979:

Party		Votes	%	Seats		
Party		Votes	%	Con.	Com.	Tot.
Progressive Party	B	3,357	32.44%	2	0	2
Independence Party	D	2,428	23.46%	1	1	2
People's Alliance	G	1,544	14.92%	1	0	1
Social Democratic Party	A	1,535	14.83%	1	0	1
Independent Voters	L	1,484	14.34%	1	0	1
Valid votes		10,348	100.00%	6	1	7
Blank votes		236	2.22%			
Rejected votes – other		31	0.29%			
Total polled		10,615	90.23%			
Registered electors		11,765				

The following candidates were elected:

- Constituency seats - Eggert Haukdal (L), 1,484 votes; Garðar Sigurðsson (G), 1,531 votes; Jón Helgason (B), 3,077 votes; Magnús Helgi Magnússon (A), 1,535 votes; Steinþór Gestsson (D), 2,425 votes; and Þórarinn Sigurjónsson (B), 3,355 votes.
- Compensatory seats - Guðmundur Karlsson (D), 2,225 votes.

===== 1978 =====
Results of the 1978 parliamentary election held on 25 June 1978:

Party		Votes	%	Seats		
Party		Votes	%	Con.	Com.	Tot.
Independence Party	D	3,275	32.29%	2	0	2
Progressive Party	B	2,462	24.27%	2	0	2
People's Alliance	G	1,979	19.51%	1	0	1
Social Democratic Party	A	1,743	17.18%	1	0	1
Independent Voters	L	466	4.59%	0	0	0
Union of Liberals and Leftists	F	218	2.15%	0	0	0
Valid votes		10,143	100.00%	6	0	6
Blank votes		216	2.08%			
Rejected votes – other		31	0.30%			
Total polled		10,390	90.41%			
Registered electors		11,492				

The following candidates were elected:

- Constituency seats - Eggert Haukdal (D), 3,211 votes; Garðar Sigurðsson (G), 1,941 votes; Guðmundur Karlsson (D), 2,965 votes; Jón Helgason (B), 2,245 votes; Magnús Helgi Magnússon (A), 1,741 votes; and Þórarinn Sigurjónsson (B), 2,446 votes.

===== 1974 =====
Results of the 1974 parliamentary election held on 30 June 1974:

Party		Votes	%	Seats		
Party		Votes	%	Con.	Com.	Tot.
Independence Party	D	4,057	42.68%	3	0	3
Progressive Party	B	3,213	33.80%	2	0	2
People's Alliance	G	1,369	14.40%	1	0	1
Social Democratic Party	A	568	5.98%	0	0	0
Union of Liberals and Leftists	F	299	3.15%	0	0	0
Valid votes		9,506	100.00%	6	0	6
Blank votes		126	1.30%			
Rejected votes – other		50	0.52%			
Total polled		9,682	90.91%			
Registered electors		10,650				

The following candidates were elected:

- Constituency seats - Garðar Sigurðsson (G), 1,366 votes; Guðlaugur Gíslason (D), 3,713 votes; Ingólfur Jónsson (D), 4,056 votes; Jón Helgason (B), 2,945 votes; Steinþór Gestsson (D), 3,378 votes; and Þórarinn Sigurjónsson (B), 3,210 votes.

===== 1971 =====
Results of the 1971 parliamentary election held on 13 June 1971:

Party		Votes	%	Seats		
Party		Votes	%	Con.	Com.	Tot.
Independence Party	D	3,601	38.86%	3	0	3
Progressive Party	B	3,052	32.93%	2	0	2
People's Alliance	G	1,392	15.02%	1	0	1
Social Democratic Party	A	739	7.97%	0	0	0
Union of Liberals and Leftists	F	305	3.29%	0	0	0
Candidature Party	O	178	1.92%	0	0	0
Valid votes		9,267	100.00%	6	0	6
Blank votes		135	1.43%			
Rejected votes – other		25	0.27%			
Total polled		9,427	92.12%			
Registered electors		10,233				

The following candidates were elected:

- Constituency seats - Ágúst Þorvaldsson (B), 3,047 votes; Björn Fr. Björnsson (B), 2,788 votes; Garðar Sigurðsson (G), 1,391 votes; Guðlaugur Gíslason (D), 3,293 votes; Ingólfur Jónsson (D), 3,599 votes; and Steinþór Gestsson (D), 2,994 votes.

==== 1960s ====
===== 1967 =====
Results of the 1967 parliamentary election held on 11 June 1967:

Party		Votes	%	Seats		
Party		Votes	%	Con.	Com.	Tot.
Independence Party	D	3,578	42.03%	3	0	3
Progressive Party	B	3,057	35.91%	2	0	2
People's Alliance	G	1,123	13.19%	1	0	1
Social Democratic Party	A	754	8.86%	0	0	0
Valid votes		8,512	100.00%	6	0	6
Blank votes		125	1.44%			
Rejected votes – other		16	0.18%			
Total polled		8,653	92.54%			
Registered electors		9,351				

The following candidates were elected:

- Constituency seats - Ágúst Þorvaldsson (B), 3,056 votes; Björn Fr. Björnsson (B), 2,801 votes; Guðlaugur Gíslason (D), 3,273 votes; Ingólfur Jónsson (D), 3,576 votes; Karl Guðjónsson (G), 1,122 votes; and Steinþór Gestsson (D), 2,981 votes.

===== 1963 =====
Results of the 1963 parliamentary election held on 9 June 1963:

Party		Votes	%	Seats		
Party		Votes	%	Con.	Com.	Tot.
Independence Party	D	3,402	41.92%	3	0	3
Progressive Party	B	2,999	36.95%	3	0	3
People's Alliance	G	955	11.77%	0	0	0
Social Democratic Party	A	760	9.36%	0	0	0
Valid votes		8,116	100.00%	6	0	6
Blank votes		112	1.36%			
Rejected votes – other		21	0.25%			
Total polled		8,249	93.18%			
Registered electors		8,853				

The following candidates were elected:

- Constituency seats - Ágúst Þorvaldsson (B), 2,996 votes; Björn Fr. Björnsson (B), 2,748 votes; Guðlaugur Gíslason (D), 3,110 votes; Helgi Bergs (B), 2,496 votes; Ingólfur Jónsson (D), 3,401 votes; and Sigurður Ó. Ólafsson (D), 2,831 votes.

==== 1950s ====
===== October 1959 =====
Results of the October 1959 parliamentary election held on 25 and 26 October 1959:

Party		Votes	%	Seats		
Party		Votes	%	Con.	Com.	Tot.
Independence Party	D	3,234	41.53%	3	0	3
Progressive Party	B	2,810	36.08%	2	0	2
People's Alliance	G	1,053	13.52%	1	0	1
Social Democratic Party	A	691	8.87%	0	0	0
Valid votes		7,788	100.00%	6	0	6
Blank votes		139	1.75%			
Rejected votes – other		21	0.26%			
Total polled		7,948	91.27%			
Registered electors		8,708				

The following candidates were elected:

- Constituency seats - Ágúst Þorvaldsson (B), 2,796 votes; Björn Fr. Björnsson (B), 2,563 votes; Guðlaugur Gíslason (D), 2,962 votes; Ingólfur Jónsson (D), 3,232 votes; Karl Guðjónsson (G), 1,053 votes; and Sigurður Ó. Ólafsson (D), 2,693 votes.
