= Kristín Halldórsdóttir =

Icelandic politician (1939–2016)

Member of the Althing
- In office 23 April 1983 – 1989
- Constituency: Reykjanes
- In office 8 April 1995 – 8 May 1999

Personal details
- Born: 20 October 1939 Varmahlíð, Iceland
- Died: 14 July 2016 (aged 76) Reykjavík, Iceland
- Party: Women's List; Left-Green Movement
- Spouse: Jónas Kristjánsson
- Children: 4

Kristín Halldórsdóttir (20 October 1939 – 14 July 2016) was an Icelandic Women's List politician, journalist and schoolteacher who served two separate terms in the Althing from 1983 to her resignation in 1989 and again between 1995 and 1999. She taught at Digranesskóli in Kópavogur for two winters between 1964 and 1966 and she worked was a journalist at Tíminn and editor of the weekly newspaper Vikuna from 1974 to 1979. Halldórsdóttir was the first vice-president of the Lower House of Althing from 1986 to 1987 and was a substitute member of the Parliamentary Assembly of the Council of Europe for Women's List between 1987 and 1990.

== Biography ==
Kristín was born in Varmahlíð on 20 October 1939. She was the daughter of the carpenter and lighthouse worker Halldór Víglundsson and his wife Halldóra Sigurjónsdóttir, a housewife who was the principal of the Housewives' School in Laugar. Kristín worked as a saleswoman and maid in Varmahlíð, in the forestry in Vaglaskógur and at a cold store and worked on a herring farm in Siglufjörður during her teenage and schooling years. In 1960, she graduated from the Akureyri Junior College, when she passed the examination. The following year, Kristín passed the examination to become a teacher while studying at the Iceland College of Education.

She worked as a journalist at Tíminn from 1961 to 1964, and then a became a teacher at Digranesskóli in Kópavogur for two winters between 1964 and 1966. From 1972 to 1974, Kristín was a journalist at Vikuna and served as editor of the weekly newspaper from 1974 to 1979. She was one of the founding members of the Women's List political party in March 1983. At the 1983 Icelandic parliamentary election, Kristín was elected to sit in the Althing as a representative of the Reykjanes constituency. She gained reelection at the 1987 Icelandic parliamentary election before resigning her seat per Parliament rules in 1989. During her first term in Parliament, Kristín served as chair of the parliamentary party of the Association for Women's List between 1984 and 1985 and was the first vice-president of the Lower House of Althing from 1986 to 1987. When she was not in Parliament, she served as chair of the Tourism Council from 1989 to 1993. Between 4 May 1987 and 1 January 1990, Kristín was a substitute of the Parliamentary Assembly of the Council of Europe for Women's List.

In 1995, she gained re-election to the Althing and remained in Parliament until 1999 when the Women's List political party was abolished. From 1996 to 1999 Kristín served a second term as chair of the parliamentary party of the Association for Women's List. She joined the Left-Green Movement political party in 2001 and served as its secretary general from 2001 to 2005. Kristín focused on environment and nature conservation and she was active in working for the Friends of the Environment, which presented 45,000 signatures to protect Eyjabök when the 21st century commenced. She was on the Budget Committee, the Environment Committee and sat on 11 legislatures in total. After retiring from politics, she was dedicated to horsemanship.

== Personal life ==
Kristín was married to the editor and journalist Jónas Kristjánsson. The couple were the parents of four children. On the morning of 14 July 2016, she died at Mörk nursing home following a serious illness. Kristín received a memorial service at the Medical Museum in Seltjarnarnes on the afternoon of 26 July.
