= Gylfi Magnússon =

Icelandic economist and politician (born 1966)

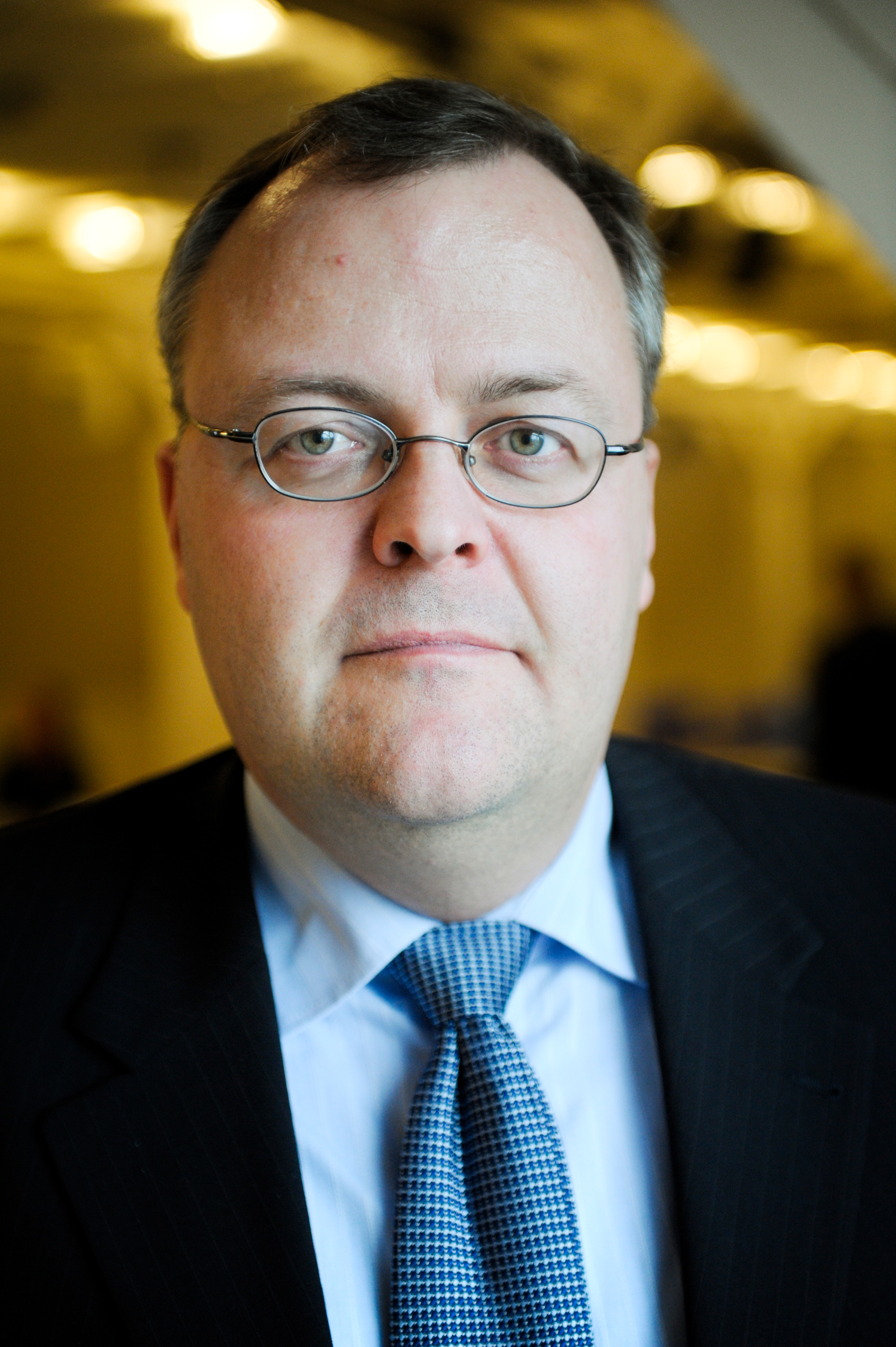

Minister of Economic Affairs
- In office 1 February 2009 – 2 September 2010
- Prime Minister: Jóhanna Sigurðardóttir
- Preceded by: Björgvin G. Sigurðsson
- Succeeded by: Árni Páll Árnason

Personal details
- Party: Independent
- Spouse: Hrafnhildur Stefánsdóttir
- Children: Three daughters (b. 1998, 2007 (twins)), two sons (b. 2001, 2003)
- Education: University of Iceland; Yale University
- Profession: Economist

Gylfi Magnússon (born 1966) is an Icelandic economist, a professor at University of Iceland and former chair of the Icelandic Competition Authority (Samkeppniseftirlitið). He was Minister for Economic Affairs in the coalition government of Jóhanna Sigurðardóttir. He served as Minister of Business Affairs from 1 February 2009 until 1 October the same year and then served as Minister of Economic Affairs until 2 September 2010.

Gylfi graduated from the University of Iceland in 1990, and received his doctorate from Yale in 1997. While at Yale, he was a core member of the champion intramural soccer team, The Handsome Lads. When he received his doctorate, he was already a researcher at the Institute of Economic Studies of the University of Iceland: he joined the Faculty of Economics and Business Administration as an adjunct professor in 1997, and was promoted to associate professor in 1998 and full professor in 2020. He served as head of the Department of Business Administration from 2000 to 2004, as dean of faculty from 2004 to 2007 and head of the School of Business from 2020 to 2024.

Political offices
Preceded by Björgvin G. Sigurðsson	Minister of Economic Affairs; 2009–2010	Succeeded by Árni Páll Árnason
