= Katrín Fjeldsted =

Icelandic politician and medical doctor (born 1946)

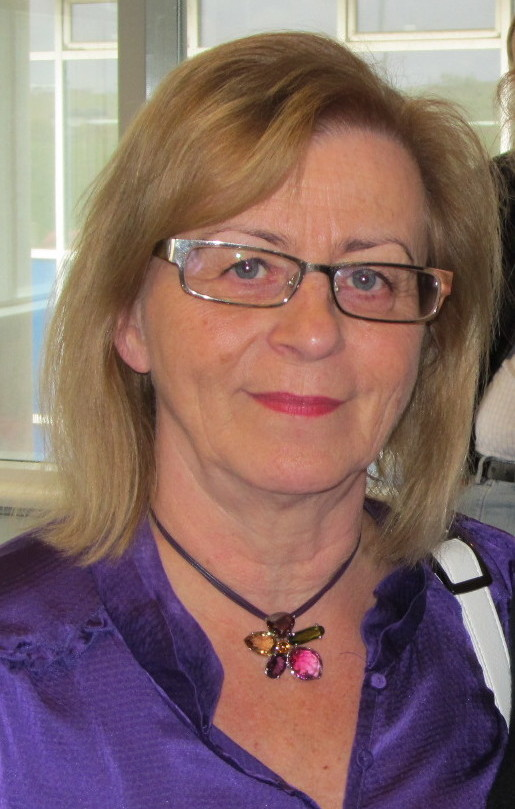
Portrait of Katrín Fjeldsted

Katrín Fjeldsted (born November 6, 1946) is an Icelandic politician and medical doctor. She has been a member of Reykjavík city council and a member of parliament at Iceland's Althingi. She was elected to Iceland's Constitutional Assembly in 2010. She has been the chairman of the Icelandic College of Family Physicians and was the President of the Standing Committee of European Doctors from 2013 until 2015.

== Biography ==
Fjeldsted finished her stúdentspróf in 1966, qualified in medicine at the University of Iceland in 1973 and finished specific training in family medicine in London in 1979 and has been a practicing family doctor in Iceland since then. She married Valgarður Egilsson (1940-2018), also a doctor, in 1967. They have had four children, three of whom are alive, and 8 grandchildren. Fjeldsted's mother was Icelandic classical composer Jórunn Viðar (1918-2017) and her father was merchant Lárus Fjeldsted (1918-1985).

== Politics ==
Fjeldsted was a member of Reykjavík city council for the Independence Party from 1982 to 1994, and of the city executive council 1986–1994. She was a member of parliament 1999-2003 for Reykjavík constituency, and deputy member 1995–1999 and 2003–2007.

Fjeldsted was Chairman of the Icelandic College of Family Physicians 1995–1999, Member of Board of the Icelandic Medical Association 1997–1999, Head of the Icelandic delegation to CPME since 2000, elected CPME Vice President for 2006–2007 and 2008–2009 and elected treasurer 2010–2012.

Fjeldsted has been President of CPME (Standing Committee of European Doctors) since January 1, 2013.
