= Tíminn =

Icelandic newspaper

- Type: Daily newspaper
- Founded: 1917
- Ceased publication: 1996
- Language: Icelandic
- Country: Iceland
- ISSN: 1670-0880
- Free online archives: timarit.is

Tíminn (transl. The Time) was an Icelandic daily newspaper founded in 1917. It had close ties with the Icelandic Progressive Party but after years of financial difficulties, the party severed all ties with the paper in 1993.

It merged with the newspaper Dagur in 1996, becoming Dagur-Tíminn. Its last edition came out on 28 August 1996.
