= Laugar =

- hamlet
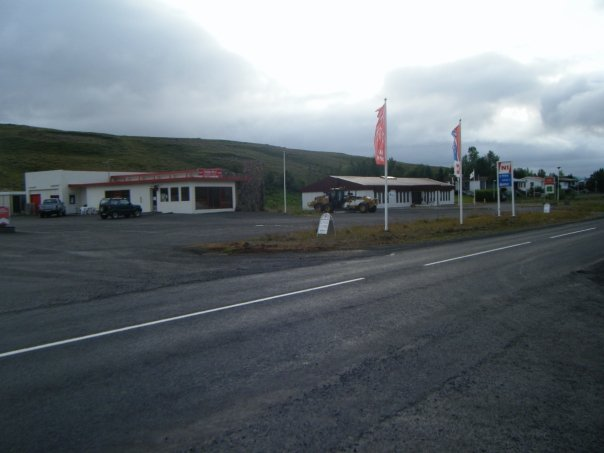
- View of Laugar

- Location within Iceland
- Country: Iceland
- Region: Northeastern Region
- Constituency: Northeast Constituency
- Municipality: Þingeyjarsveit

Population (2026)
  - Total: 120
- Postal code(s): 650
- Municipal number: 6613
- Website: thingeyjarsveit.is

Laugar is a hamlet in the Northeastern Region of Iceland, on the Reykjadalsá river, a left tributary of the Laxá í Aðaldal river. It is located at Route 1 between Akureyri and Reykjahlíð and is the largest village in the municipality of Þingeyjarsveit. On 1 January 2026, it had a population of 120 people.

Laugar developed around thermal springs, hence its name, which in Icelandic means "hot springs". Laugar is located on the Diamond Circle tourist route. In its vicinity there are famous tourist attractions: Goðafoss waterfall approx. 10 km (6.2 mi) to the west, lake Mývatn approx. 20 km (12 mi) to the southeast and lake Vestmannsvatn 8 km (5.0 mi) to the north.
