= Standing Committee of European Doctors =

European medical organization

- Comité Permanent des Médecins Européens
- Founded: 1959; 67 years ago
- Key people: Ole Johan Bakke (President), Sarada Das (Secretary General)
- Website: www.cpme.eu

The Standing Committee of European Doctors (French: Comité Permanent des Médecins Européens, CPME) represents national medical associations across Europe.

It promotes the highest standards of medical training and medical practice in order to achieve the highest quality of health care for all patients in Europe. CPME strongly advocates a “health in all policies” approach to encourage cross-sectorial awareness for and action on the social determinants of health, since a healthy economy depends on a healthy population. To achieve its goals, CPME co-operates proactively with the institutions of the European Union.

Policies are set both in response to developments in Europe, as well as by taking the lead in matters regarding the medical profession and patient care. CPME offers broad expertise in matters relating to medicine and the medical profession and is directed by a Board, which is elected by the General Assembly every three years.

== Governance ==
The bodies of the Standing Committee are:

- the General Assembly
- the Board
- the Executive Committee
- an auditor

The CPME Secretariat is situated in Brussels, Belgium.

=== Finance ===
The Standing Committee of European Doctors (CPME) is an AISBL registered under Belgian law. Its financial income is based on members’ contributions. CPME may be involved in European projects and tenders, resulting in additional funding by EU institutions. CPME does not receive financial support from industry sources.

CPME has been registered in the joint Transparency Register of the European Parliament and of the European Commission since September 2008, with an Identification number of 9276943405–41.

== Policy areas ==
CPME is active in several policy areas:

- Professional practice and patients' rights
- Public health and disease prevention
- eHealth
- Pharmaceuticals and healthcare products
- EU political outlook

== Members ==
The Standing Committee of European Doctors (CPME) represents national medical associations from the following countries:

=== Members ===
Austria, Belgium, Bulgaria, Croatia, Cyprus, Czech Republic, Denmark, Estonia, Finland, France, Germany, Greece, Hungary, Iceland, Ireland, Latvia, Lithuania, Luxembourg, Malta, Netherlands, Norway, Poland, Portugal, Romania, Slovakia, Slovenia, Sweden, Switzerland, United Kingdom

=== Associate Members ===
Turkey, Ukraine

=== Associate organisations ===
EMSA, EUMASS, WMA, MWIA

=== Observers ===
Albania, Georgia, Israel, Kosovo, (Note: References to Kosovo are without prejudice to positions on status. They are in line with United Nations Security Council Resolution 1244/1999 and the opinion by the International Court of Justice on the Kosovo declaration of independence.) Serbia
