= Sigríður Jóhannesdóttir =

Icelandic politician (born 1943)

Sigríður Jóhannesdóttir (SJóh)

Member of the Althing
- In office 18 July 1996 – 10 May 2003
- Preceded by: Ólafur Ragnar Grímsson
- Constituency: Reykjanes

Personal details
- Born: 10 June 1943 (age 83) Reykjavík, Iceland
- Party: Social Democratic Alliance
- Education: University of Moscow; Iceland College of Education

Sigríður Jóhannesdóttir (born 10 June 1943) is an Icelandic politician and former member of the Althing. A member of the Social Democratic Alliance, she represented the Reykjanes constituency from July 1996 to May 2003.

Sigríður was born on 10 June 1943 in Reykjavík. She is the daughter of industrial worker Jóhannes Guðnason and Jóna Ásmundsdóttir. She graduated from Reykjavík High School (MR) in 1963. She studied Russian and biology at the University of Moscow (1963–1965) and qualified as a teacher from the Iceland College of Education (KÍ) in 1967. She also studied at the Teachers College in Copenhagen from 1979 to 1980. She was a teacher at Selfoss Kindergarten from 1965 to 1966 and Myllubakka School in Keflavík from 1969 to 1996. She was on the board of the Icelandic Teachers' Association (Kennarasambands Íslands) from 1982 to 1991 and was chair of the board of the Suðurnesja Polytechnic School from 1990 to 1994.

Sigríður was a member of the municipal council in Keflavík. She was a substitute member of the Althing for Ólafur Ragnar Grímsson in April 1992, from April 1993 to May 1993 and from April 1996 to July 1996. She was appointed to the Althing in July 1996 after Ólafur Ragnar was elected president.

Sigríður married teacher Ásgeir Árnason in 1964 and has a son and three daughters.

Electoral history of Sigríður Jóhannesdóttir
Election	Constituency	Party	Votes	Result
1991 parliamentary	Reykjanes	People's Alliance	4,449	Not elected
1995 parliamentary	Reykjanes	People's Alliance	5,292	Not elected
1999 parliamentary	Reykjanes	Social Democratic Alliance	12,542	Elected
