= Guðmundur Árni Stefánsson =

Icelandic politician and diplomat

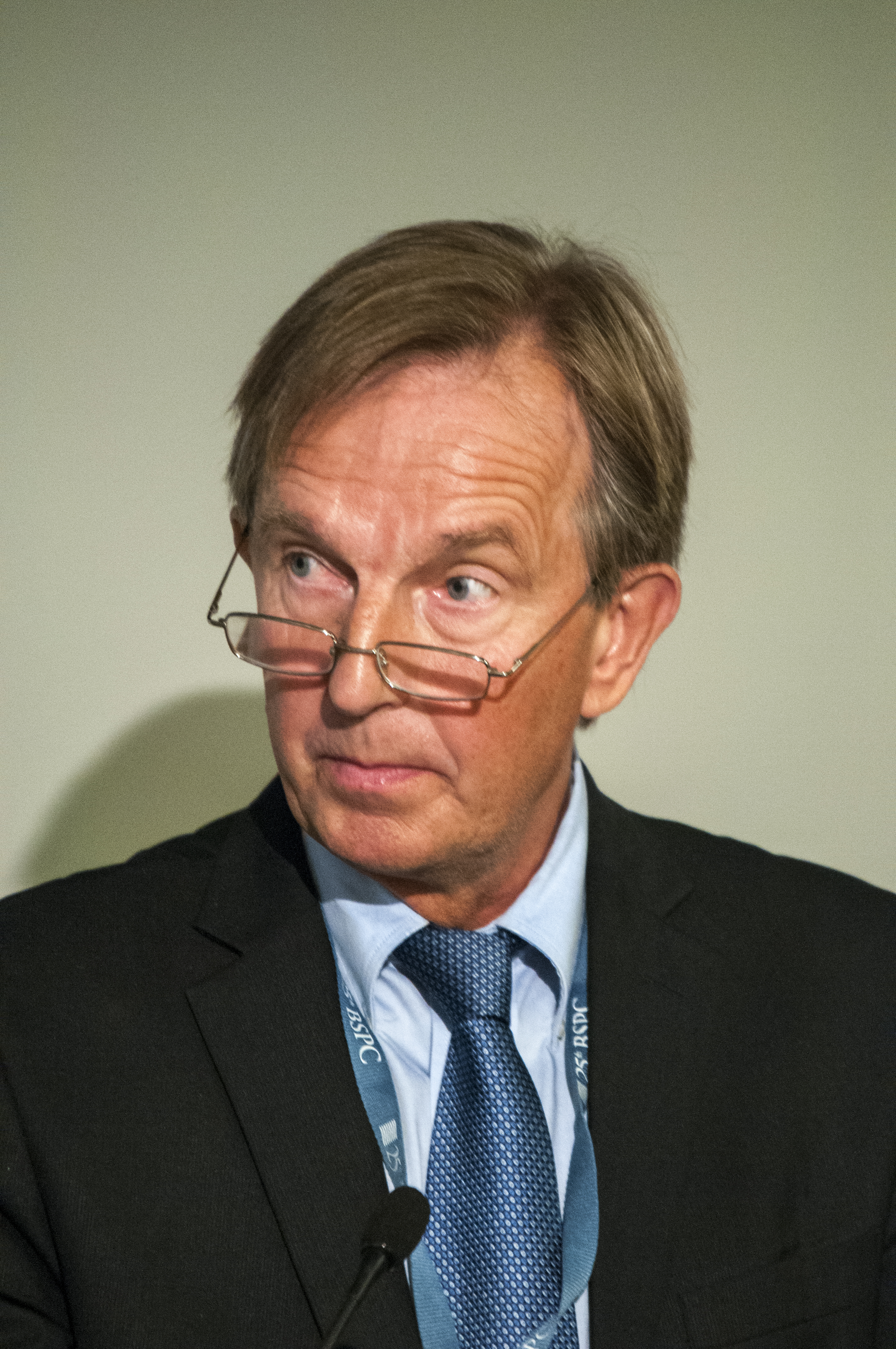

Minister of Health and Social Security
- In office 14 June 1993 – 24 June 1994
- Prime Minister: Davíð Oddsson
- Preceded by: Sighvatur Kristinn Björgvinsson
- Succeeded by: Sighvatur Kristinn Björgvinsson

Minister of Social Affairs
- In office 24 June 1994 – 12 November 1994
- Prime Minister: Davíð Oddsson
- Preceded by: Jóhanna Sigurðardóttir
- Succeeded by: Rannveig Guðmundsdóttir

Icelandic Ambassador to the United States
- In office 1 October 2011 – 23 February 2015
- President: Ólafur Ragnar Grímsson
- Prime Minister: Jóhanna Sigurðardóttir; Sigmundur Davíð Gunnlaugsson
- Preceded by: Hjálmar W. Hannesson
- Succeeded by: Geir Haarde

Personal details
- Born: 31 October 1955 (age 70) Hafnarfjörður, Iceland
- Party: Social Democratic Party

Guðmundur Árni Stefánsson (born 31 October 1955) is an Icelandic politician and diplomat. He was a member of the Althing from 1993 to 2005, was Minister of Health and Social Security and Minister of Social Affairs, and has served as Iceland's ambassador to several countries.

== Early life and education ==
Guðmundur was born in Hafnarfjörður, where he finished school at Flensborgarskóli. He studied political science at the University of Iceland from 1978 to 1980. His father, Stefán Gunnlaugsson, his brother Gunnlaugur Stefánsson, and his half-brother Finnur Torfi Stefánsson were all also members of the Althing.

== Non-political career ==
From 1975 to 1986, except for four years as a police officer in Reykjavík, he worked as a journalist in newspapers and broadcasting, including as editor of Alþýðublaðið from 1982 to 1985.

== Political and diplomatic career ==
He was a representative for Hafnarfjörður from 1982 to 1994 and from 1986 to 1993 mayor of Hafnarfjörður.

He was elected a deputy member of the Althing for Reykjanes in October 1991 and January 1993, then in 1993 as a full member for Reykjanes from the Social Democratic Party. He continued to serve until 2005, later as a member of the joint parliamentary group formed by the Social Democrats and the National Awakening and then of the Social Democratic Alliance, from 2003 representing the Southwest. He was named Minister of Health and Social Security in June 1993 and was Minister of Social Affairs from June to November 1994; in 1995–1999 he was fourth vice-president of the Althing and in 1999–2005, first vice president.

From 1995 to 1997, Guðmundur was a member of the Icelandic delegation to the Nordic Council, then from 1997 to 2005, of the Icelandic delegation to NATO; he served as chairman in 2005.

Since leaving the Althing and being appointed Ambassador to Sweden in November 2005, Guðmundur has served as the Ambassador of Iceland to multiple countries:

- Ambassador of Iceland to Albania from 28 June 2007 to 21 November 2013.
- Ambassador of Iceland to Argentina from 23 October 2013
- Ambassador of Iceland to Brazil
- Ambassador of Iceland to Cyprus from 4 September 2007 to 11 January 2012.
- Ambassador of Iceland to India from September 2018 to April 2020.
- Ambassador of Iceland to Kuwait from 16 January 2008
- Ambassador of Iceland to Mexico
- Ambassador of Iceland to Serbia from 18 May 2007 to 22 June 2011.
- Ambassador of Iceland to Sri Lanka from 1 February 2019
- Ambassador of Iceland to Sweden from 30 November 2005 to 28 October 2011.
- Ambassador of Iceland to Syria from 4 December 2007
- Ambassador of Iceland to the United States from 1 October 2011 to 23 February 2015.

In April 2020 he was named Consul General of Iceland in Winnipeg, Canada.

== Personal life ==
Guðmundur married Jóna Dóra Karlsdóttir in 1977. They have four children; their two eldest sons died in childhood in a house fire in 1985.
