= Árni Páll Árnason =

Icelandic politician

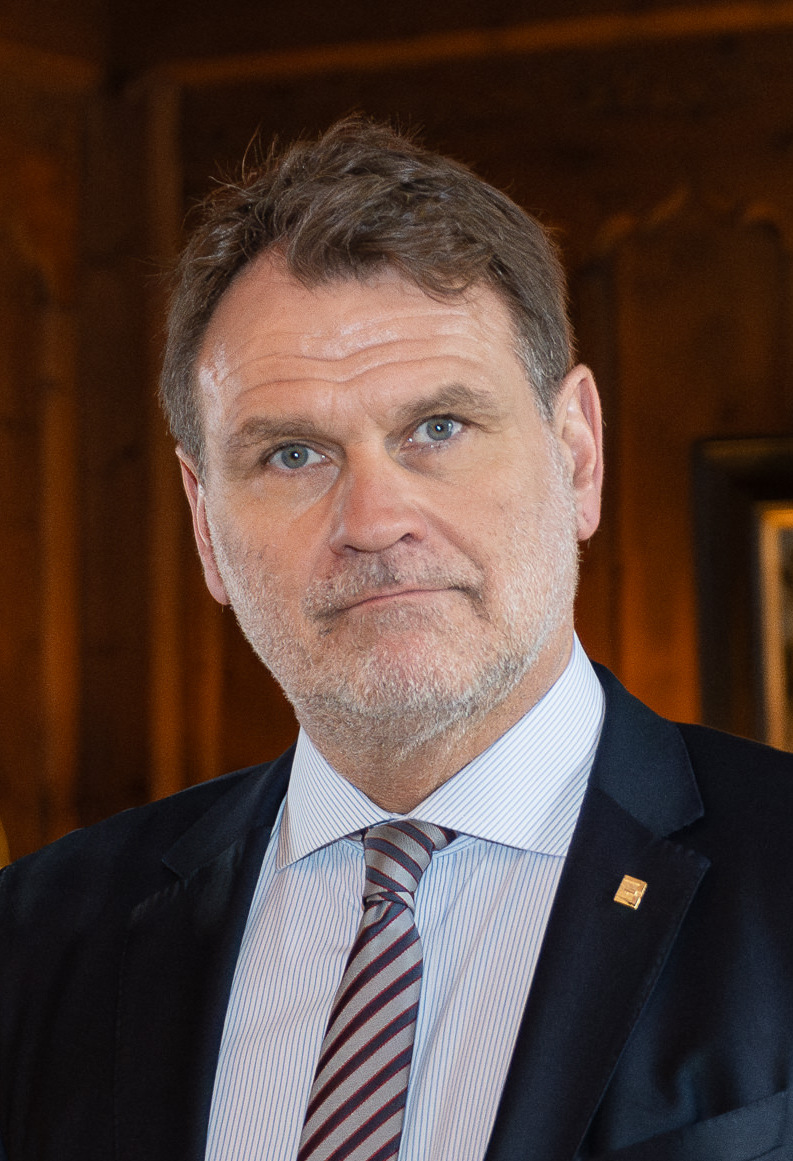
- Árnason in 2024

Leader of the Social Democratic Alliance
- In office 26 February 2013 – 3 June 2016
- Preceded by: Jóhanna Sigurðardóttir
- Succeeded by: Oddný Guðbjörg Harðardóttir

Minister of Economic Affairs
- In office 2 September 2010 – 31 December 2011
- Prime Minister: Jóhanna Sigurðardóttir
- Preceded by: Gylfi Magnússon
- Succeeded by: Steingrímur Sigfússon

Minister of Social Affairs
- In office 10 May 2009 – 2 September 2010
- Prime Minister: Jóhanna Sigurðardóttir
- Preceded by: Ásta Ragnheiður Jóhannesdóttir
- Succeeded by: Guðbjartur Hannesson

Personal details
- Born: 23 May 1966 (age 60) Reykjavík, Iceland
- Party: Social Democratic Alliance
- Education: University of Iceland; College of Europe

Árni Páll Árnason (born 23 May 1966) is Vice-President and a member of the College of the EFTA Surveillance Authority, responsible for Competition, Energy, Environment, Transport, Food Safety, Free movement of goods, Public undertakings and Monopolies and Public procurement. He took up his duties on 1 January 2022.

Árni Páll Árnason is a former Icelandic politician, who served in the government of Iceland as Minister of Social Affairs and Social Security from 10 May 2009 to 2 September 2010, and as Minister of Economic Affairs from 2 September 2010 to 31 December 2011. He served as a Member of Parliament for the Social Democratic Party from 2007 - 2016. He was elected party leader in February 2013 in a ballot of all party members with 62,2% of the votes cast, and served as leader until June 2016.

He was commissioned in June 2017 by the Nordic Council of Ministers to undertake a strategic review of the Nordic Welfare Model. He delivered a final report to the Swedish Social Minister, Annika Strandhäll, on 16 October 2018, named Knowledge that works in practice - strengthening Nordic co-operation in the social field.

Árni Páll Árnason served as Deputy Managing Director of the Financial Mechanism Office for the EEA and Norway Grants in Brussels from 2018 to 2021.

Born in Reykjavik, he received a law degree from the University of Iceland in 1991 and did postgraduate studies in European law at the College of Europe, from 1991 to 1992 (Mozart Promotion). He became an attorney at law in 1997.

Party political offices
Preceded by Jóhanna Sigurðardóttir	Leader of the Social Democratic Alliance; 2013–2016	Succeeded by Oddný Guðbjörg Harðardóttir
