= Gunnar Birgisson =

Icelandic politician (1947–2021)

Mayor of Fjallabyggð

Personal details
- Born: 30 September 1947; Reykjavík, Iceland
- Died: 14 June 2021 (aged 73); Reykjavík, Iceland
- Political party: Independence Party

Gunnar Ingi Birgisson (30 September 1947 – 14 June 2021) was an Icelandic politician. Birgir was a member of Alþingi and a mayor of Kópavogur and Fjallabyggð. He coined the saying "Það er gott að búa í Kópavogi" ("It's good to live in Kópavogur"), which is now regarded as the unofficial motto of Kópavogur. He held a doctorate in engineering from the University of Missouri. His doctoral essay about how lava fields performed as foundations. His maternal half brother, Kristinn Halldór Gunnarsson, was also a prominent politician.
