= Alliance of Social Democrats =

Alliance of Social Democrats Bandalag jafnaðarmanna
- Founder: Vilmundur Gylfason
- Founded: 15 January 1983
- Split from: Social Democratic Party
- Ideology: Social democracy
- Political position: Centre-left

The Alliance of Social Democrats (Icelandic: Bandalag jafnaðarmanna) was a social-democratic political party in Iceland. The party was founded by Vilmundur Gylfason and won four seats in the 1983 elections.

== History ==
The party was established in 1983 by Vilmundur Gylfason, as a breakaway from the Social Democratic Party. It won four seats in the Althing in the April elections that year, although Vilmundur died later that year. In 1986, all of its parliamentary members left the party, with three members joining the Social Democratic Party and one joining the Independence Party. The party failed to win a seat in the 1987 elections, with its vote share falling from 7.3% to just 0.2%.

== Election results ==
Election	Leader	Votes	%	Seats	+/–	Position	Status
1983	Vilmundur Gylfason	9,489	7.3	4 / 60	New	▲5th	Opposition
1987		246	0.2	0 / 63	▼4	▼10th	Extra-parliamentary
