= Magnús Stefánsson =

Icelandic politician

Minister of Social Affairs
- In office 15 June 2006 – 24 May 2007
- Prime Minister: Geir Haarde
- Preceded by: Jón Kristjánsson
- Succeeded by: Jóhanna Sigurðardóttir (as Minister of Social Affairs and Social Security)

Personal details
- Born: 1 October 1960 (age 65) Reykjavík, Iceland
- Party: Progressive Party
- Spouse: Sigrún Drífa Óttarsdóttir
- Children: Two children (b. 1987, 1991)

Magnús Stefánsson (born 1 October 1960) is an Icelandic politician. He has been member of the Althing (Iceland's parliament) for the Progressive Party for the Western Iceland constituency (1995–99; 2001–03) and for the Northwest Iceland constituency since 2003. He has been vice-chairman of the Progressive Party parliamentary group since 2003, and was Minister of Social Affairs from 2006 to 2007.

Political offices
Preceded by Jón Kristjánsson	Minister of Social Affairs; 2006–2007	Succeeded by Jóhanna Sigurðardóttir as Minister of Social Affairs and Social Security
