= Ólafur Garðar Einarsson =

Icelandic politician (1932–2023)

Ólafur Garðar Einarsson (7 July 1932 – 27 April 2023) was an Icelandic politician. He was a member of the Althing from 1971 until 1999, serving as minister of education, science and culture from 1991 to 1995 and as speaker from 1995 to 1999.
