= Rannveig Guðmundsdóttir =

Icelandic politician (born 1940)

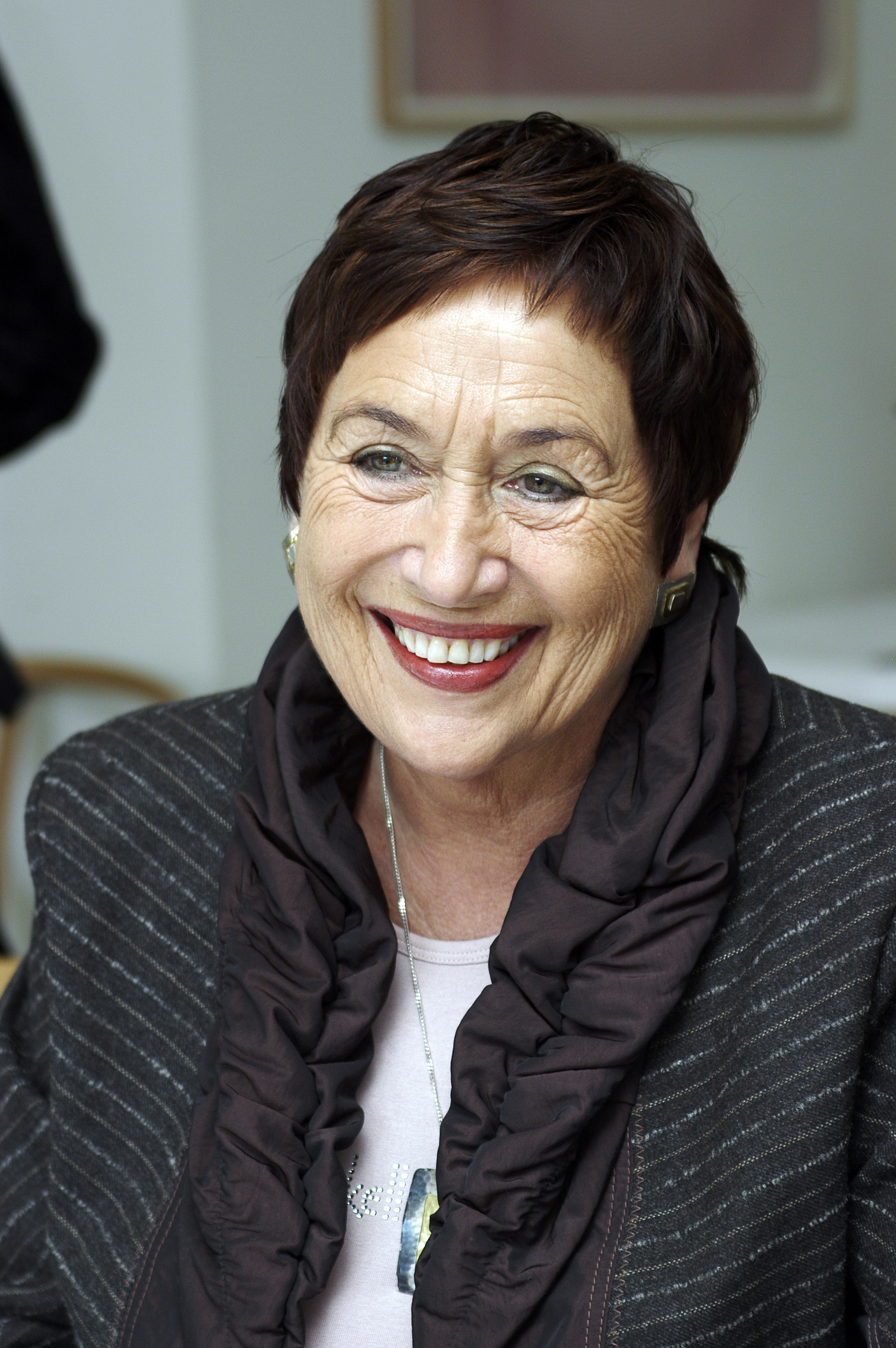

Minister of Social Affairs
- In office 12 November 1994 – 23 April 1995
- Prime Minister: Davíð Oddsson
- Preceded by: Guðmundur Árni Stefánsson
- Succeeded by: Páll Bragi Pétursson

Personal details
- Born: 15 September 1940 (age 85) Ísafjörður, Kingdom of Iceland
- Party: Social Democratic Party; Social Democratic Alliance
- Spouse: Sverrir Jónsson
- Children: 3
- Occupation: Icelandic politician

Rannveig Guðmundsdóttir (born 15 September 1940) is an Icelandic politician. She has served as a member of the Icelandic parliament, as Minister of Social Services in the Government of Iceland, and was President of the Nordic Council in 2005.

== Early life ==
Rannveig was born in Ísafjörður, Iceland, the daughter of skipper (boating) Guðmundur Kr. Guðmundsson (born 15 August 1897, died 12 January 1961) and homemaker Sigurjóna Guðmundína Jónasdóttir (born 14 January 1903, died 9 September 1954). In 1960 she married technologist Sverrir Jónsson (born 9 July 1939). She studied computer programming 1970–1972 in Oslo, Norway and Reykjavík, Iceland.

Rannveig was an employee of the Post Office in Ísafjörður 1956–1962. She did clerical work in 1962–1963 and 1967–1968 and was a computer programmer for Loftleiðir Airlines 1972–1976.

== Politics ==
Rannveig was a member of the council of Kópavogur 1978–1988. Political aide to the Minister of Social Services 1988–1989. Member of parliament from 1989 to 2007 for the Social Democratic Party and its successor, the Social Democratic Alliance. Appointed Minister of Social Affairs in the Government of Iceland on 12 November 1994, served until 23 April 1995. President of the Nordic Council 2004 to 2005.

== See also ==
- Samfylkingin
