= Bryndís Hlöðversdóttir =

Icelandic politician (born 1960)

Bryndís Hlöðversdóttir (BH)

Member of the Althing
- In office 10 May 2003 – 1 August 2005
- Succeeded by: Ingibjörg Sólrún Gísladóttir
- Constituency: Reykjavík North
- In office 8 April 1995 – 10 May 2003
- Constituency: Reykjavík

Personal details
- Born: 8 October 1960 (age 65) Selfoss, Iceland
- Party: Social Democratic Alliance
- Education: University of Iceland

Bryndís Hlöðversdóttir (born 8 October 1960) is an Icelandic politician and former member of the Althing. A member of the Social Democratic Alliance, she represented the Reykjavík constituency from April 1995 to May 2003 and the Reykjavík North constituency from May 2003 to August 2005.

Bryndís was born on 8 October 1960 in Selfoss. She is the daughter of security guard Hlöðver Kristjánsson and paramedic Kristjana Esther Jónsdóttir and has eight siblings - five brothers and three sisters. She lived in several places as a child - Skálmholt in Flóahreppur, Ey II in Vestur Landeyjahreppur and Kópavogur. She graduated from the Flensburg Polytechnic in Hafnarfjörður in 1982 and received a law degree from the University of Iceland (HÍ) in 1992.

Bryndís was an office worker in Reykjavík from 1982 and 1987 and an employee of the Ministry of Justice from 1990 to 1992. She was a lawyer at the Icelandic Confederation of Labour (ASÍ) from 1992 to 1995. She was a part-time tutor at Bifröst University from 2004 to 2005 before serving as dean of the university's Faculty of Law (2005–2011) and rector (2011–2013). She has served on the board of several state-owned organisations: Salary Guarantee Fund (Ábyrgðasjóður launa), Orkuveita Reykjavíkur, Landsvirkjun, Eignasel ehf and Shopkeepers' Pension Fund (Lífeyrissjóður verzlunarmanna). She became chair of the Landsvirkjun energy company in September 2010. She was personnel manager at the state-owned Landspítali hospital from 2013 and 2015.

Bryndís was on the board of the Icelandic Women's Rights Association from 1992 and 1997 and served as its chair from 1995 to 1997. She was elected to the Althing at the 1995 parliamentary election. She was chair of the social democratic parliamentary group from February 2001 to January 2004. She resigned from the Althing in August 2005 after being appointed dean at Bifröst University and was replaced by Ingibjörg Sólrún Gísladóttir. In May 2015 she was appointed State Mediator (Ríkissáttasemjari) by Minister of Social Affairs and Housing Eygló Harðardóttir. She was appointed head of the Prime Minister's Office in November 2019. In April 2024 she was appointed head of the Ministry of Food after Bjarni Benediktsson became prime minister.

Bryndís married carpenter Jóel Jóelsson in July 1984 and business analyst Hákon Gunnarsson in December 2001 but both marriages ended in divorce. She has two sons with Hákon.

Electoral history of Bryndís Hlöðversdóttir
Election	Constituency	Party	Votes	Result
1995 parliamentary	Reykjavík	People's Alliance	9,386	Elected
1999 parliamentary	Reykjavík	Social Democratic Alliance	19,095	Elected
2003 parliamentary	Reykjavík North	Social Democratic Alliance	11,454.6	Elected
