= Ásta Ragnheiður Jóhannesdóttir =

Icelandic politician (born 1949)

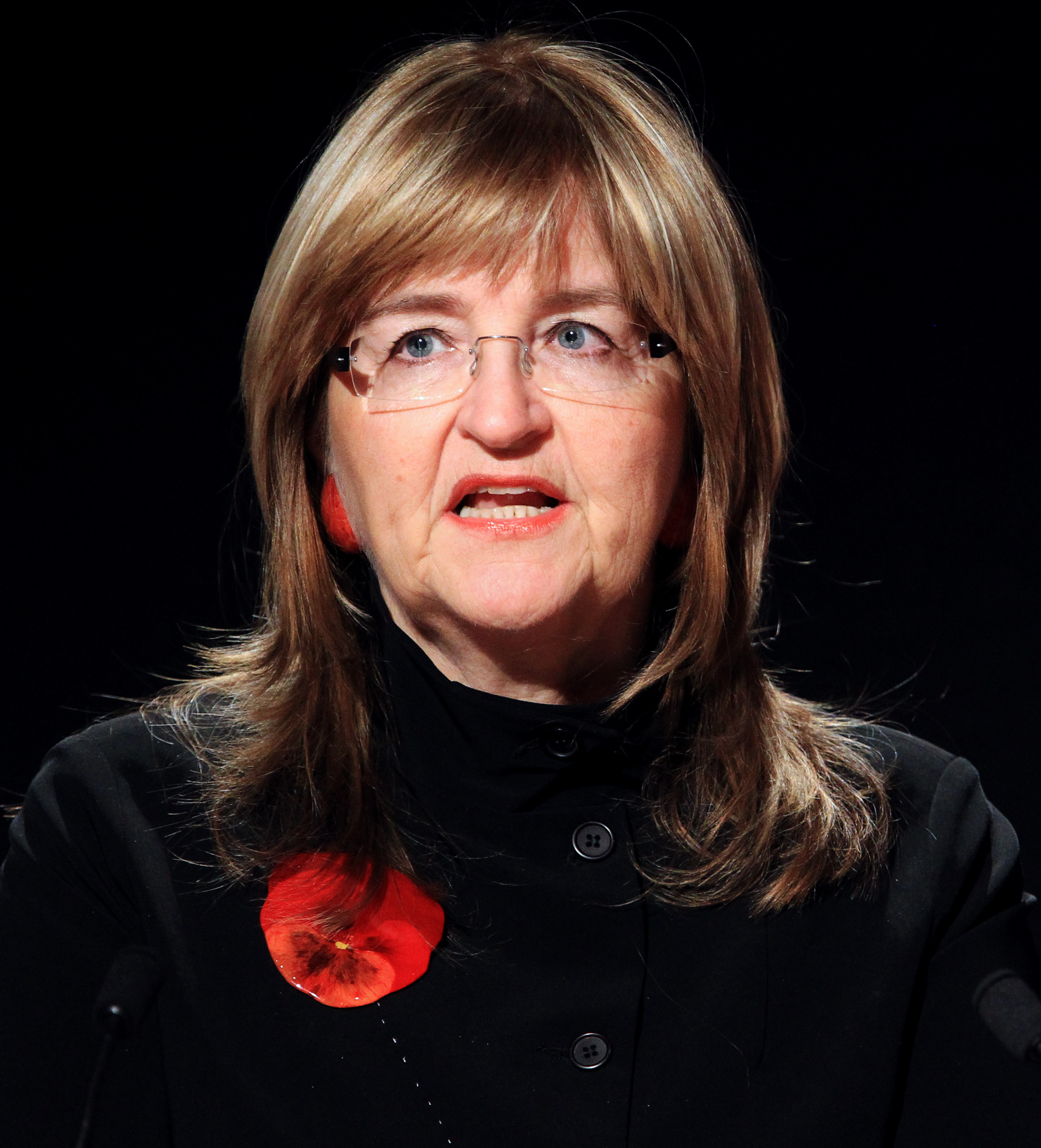
- Ásta R. Jóhannesdóttir in November 2010

Minister of Social Affairs and Social Security
- In office 1 February 2009 – 10 May 2009
- Prime Minister: Jóhanna Sigurðardóttir
- Preceded by: Jóhanna Sigurðardóttir
- Succeeded by: Árni Páll Árnason

Personal details
- Born: 16 October 1949 (age 76) Reykjavík, Iceland
- Party: Social Democratic Alliance
- Spouse: Einar Örn Stefánsson
- Children: A daughter (b. 1972) and a son (b. 1976)
- Education: University of Iceland

Ásta Ragnheiður Jóhannesdóttir (Icelandic: [ˈausta ˈrakn̥heiðʏr ˈjouːhanɛsˌtouʰtɪr̥]; born 16 October 1949) is an Icelandic politician, lawmaker and a former Speaker of Alþingi, Iceland's parliament. She was Iceland's Minister of Social Affairs and Social Security from 1 February 2009 – 14 May 2009. She served as speaker of the Althing from 2009 to 2013. She has been a member of the Alþing since 1995.

Political offices
Preceded by Jóhanna Sigurðardóttir	Minister of Social Affairs and Social Security; 2009	Succeeded by Árni Páll Árnason
