= Guðni Ágústsson =

Icelandic politician

Minister of Agriculture
- In office 1999–2007
- Prime Minister: Davíð Oddsson; Halldór Ásgrímsson; Geir Haarde
- Preceded by: Guðmundur Bjarnason
- Succeeded by: Einar Kristinn Guðfinnsson (as Minister of Fisheries and Agriculture)

Personal details
- Born: 9 April 1949 (age 77) Brúnastaðir, Iceland
- Party: Progressive Party

Guðni Ágústsson (born 9 April 1949) is an Icelandic former politician who was chairman of the Progressive Party from 2007 until 17 November 2008, when he unexpectedly resigned, both as chairman of his party and as MP. He was a member of the Althing 1987–2008, for the Southern Constituency from 1987 to 2003 and for the South Constituency since 2003. From 1999 to 2007, he was Minister of Agriculture.

Political offices
Preceded by Guðmundur Bjarnason	Minister of Agriculture; 1999–2007	Succeeded by Einar Kristinn Guðfinnsson as Minister of Fisheries and Agriculture
Party political offices
Preceded by Jón Sigurðsson	Chairman of the Progressive Party; 2007–2008	Succeeded by Valgerður Sverrisdóttir
