= Pétur Blöndal =

Icelandic politician (1944–2015)

Pétur Haraldsson Blöndal

Member of the Althing
- In office 1995–2015
- Constituency: Reykjavík (1995–2003); Reykjavík South (2003–2007, 2013–2015); Reykjavík North (2007–2013)

Personal details
- Born: 24 June 1944 Reykjavík, Iceland
- Died: 26 June 2015 (aged 71)
- Party: Independence Party

Pétur Haraldsson Blöndal (24 June 1944 – 26 June 2015) was an Icelandic parliamentarian in the Icelandic Independence Party and was president in the committees of the Organization for Security and Co-operation in Europe, Social Affairs Committee and Health and Ensurance Committee.

He held a doctorate in mathematics from the University of Cologne. He ran unsuccessfully for the chairmanship of the Independence Party at their national meeting in late June 2010 and received 30% of the vote.

Pétur died in his home on 26 June 2015 after years of battling cancer.
