= Jóhanna Sigurðardóttir =

Prime Minister of Iceland from 2009 to 2013

Her Excellency Jóhanna Sigurðardóttir
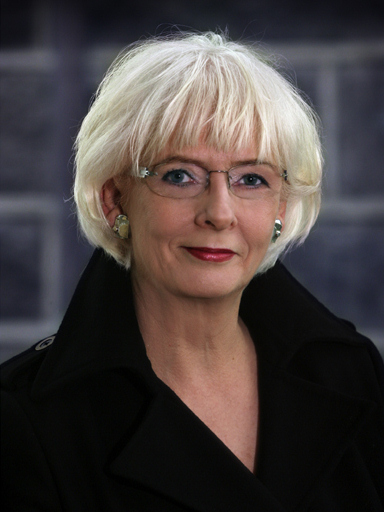
- Official portrait, c. 2007-2009

28th Prime Minister of Iceland
- In office 1 February 2009 – 23 May 2013
- President: Ólafur Ragnar Grímsson
- Preceded by: Geir Haarde
- Succeeded by: Sigmundur Davíð Gunnlaugsson

Minister of Social Affairs and Social Security
- In office 24 May 2007 – 1 February 2009
- Prime Minister: Geir Haarde
- Preceded by: Magnús Stefánsson (Social Affairs); Siv Friðleifsdóttir (Health and Social Security)
- Succeeded by: Ásta Ragnheiður Jóhannesdóttir
- In office 8 July 1987 – 24 June 1994
- Prime Minister: Þorsteinn Pálsson; Steingrímur Hermannsson; Davíð Oddsson
- Preceded by: Alexander Stefánsson
- Succeeded by: Guðmundur Árni Stefánsson

Member of the Althing
- In office 25 June 1978 – 27 April 2013

Personal details
- Born: 4 October 1942 (age 84) Reykjavík, Kingdom of Iceland
- Party: Social Democratic Party (Before 1994); National Awakening (1994–2000); Social Democratic Alliance (2000–present)
- Spouses: Þorvaldur Steinar Jóhannesson (m. 1970; div. 1987) Jónína Leósdóttir (m. 2010)
- Children: 2 sons; 1 stepson

Jóhanna Sigurðardóttir (Icelandic pronunciation: [ˈjouːhana ˈsɪːɣʏrðarˌtouhtɪr̥]; born 4 October 1942) is an Icelandic politician, who served as prime minister of Iceland from 2009 to 2013. She was Iceland's first female prime minister and the first openly LGBTQ head of government in the world.

Elected as an MP from 1978 to 2013, she was appointed as Iceland's Minister of Social Affairs and Social Security, serving from 1987 to 1994, and from 2007 until 2009. In 1994, when she lost a bid to head the Social Democratic Party, she raised her fist and declared "Minn tími mun koma!" ("My time will come!"), a phrase that became a popular Icelandic expression. Later in 1994, she left the party and formed her own party, National Awakening (Þjóðvaki), with her as leader. The party received 7.1% of the popular vote in the 1995 parliamentary election and four elected MPs. In 1996 all of the MPs joined the Social Democratic Party. In the 1999 election, National Awakening ran with the newly formed Social Democratic Alliance. In 2000 the party officially merged with the Social Democratic Alliance.

Jóhanna became prime minister on 1 February 2009, in a minority cabinet formed after the previous coalition was dissolved following the 2008 Icelandic financial crisis. Her coalition received a majority in the 2009 parliamentary election. Forbes listed her among the 100 most powerful women in the world in 2009.

She was a member of the Althing (Iceland's parliament) for Reykjavík constituencies from 1978 to 2013, winning re-election on eight successive occasions. In September 2012, Jóhanna announced she would not seek re-election and retired from politics as Iceland's then longest serving member of Parliament.

== Education and early career ==
Jóhanna was born in Reykjavík. Her father was Sigurður Egill Ingimundarson. She studied at the Commercial College of Iceland, a vocational high school operated by the Chamber of Commerce. After graduating with her commercial diploma in 1960, she worked as a flight attendant with Icelandic Airlines (a predecessor of Icelandair) from 1962 to 1971, and as an office manager from 1971 to 1978.

She was active in the trade union movement from early in her professional life, presiding over the Board of the Icelandic Cabin Crew Association in 1966 and 1969 and over the Board of Svölurnar, Association of Former Stewardesses in 1975. She was also a member of the Board of the Commercial Workers' Union from 1976 to 1983.

== Political career ==
Jóhanna was elected to the Althing in 1978 on the list of the Social Democratic Party for the Reykjavík constituency. She enjoyed early success in her parliamentary career, serving as deputy speaker of the Althing in 1979 and in 1983–84. She was elected vice-chairperson of the Social Democratic Party in 1984, a post she held until 1993. She was also Minister of Social Affairs in four separate Cabinets from 1987 to 1994, when she left the Social Democratic Party after losing the leadership contest to form a new party, National Awakening; the two parties remerged in 2000 to form the present Social Democratic Alliance. Her 1994 declaration Minn tími mun koma! ("My time will come!"), after she lost the contest for the leadership of the Social Democratic Party, has become an iconic phrase in the Icelandic language.

From 1994 to 2003, she was an active member of the opposition in the Althing, serving on numerous parliamentary committees. After the 2003 elections, which she contested from the Reykjavík South constituency (after the split of the old Reykjavík constituency), she was re-elected deputy speaker of the Althing. The 2007 elections, which she contested from the Reykjavík North constituency, saw the return of the Social Democratic Alliance to government in coalition with the Independence Party, and Jóhanna was named Minister of Social Affairs and Social Security.

=== Prime minister ===
==== Icelandic financial crisis, protests and elections ====
On 26 January 2009, Prime Minister Geir Haarde tendered the coalition government's resignation to the President of Iceland, Ólafur Ragnar Grímsson.

After talks with the leaders of the five parties represented in the Althing, the President asked the Social Democratic Alliance and the Left-Green Movement to form a new government and to prepare for elections in the spring.

Jóhanna was proposed as prime minister for the new government; two reasons for this were her popularity among the general public and her good relations with the Left-Green Movement. An opinion poll by Capacent Gallup in December 2008 found 73% approval of her actions as a minister, more than any other member of the cabinet: she was also the only minister to have improved her approval ratings over 2008.

The new government needed the support of the Progressive Party in the Althing. Negotiations continued up to the evening of 31 January, and the new cabinet was appointed on 1 February. Independent polling showed that Jóhanna and Steingrímur J. Sigfússon, leader of the Left-Green Movement, the other party in the coalition government, enjoyed considerable support outside their own parties.

On 25 April 2009, a parliamentary election was held in Iceland, following the protests now known as the Kitchenware Revolution that resulted from the Icelandic financial crisis.

The Social Democratic Alliance and the Left-Green Movement, which formed the outgoing coalition government under Jóhanna, both made gains and together had an overall majority of seats in the Althing. The Progressive Party also made gains, and the new Citizens' Movement, formed after the January 2009 protests, gained four seats. The Independence Party, which had been in power for eighteen years until January 2009, lost a third of its support and nine seats in the Althing. On 10 May 2009, the new government was announced, with Jóhanna staying on as prime minister.

==== Overcoming the financial crisis ====
There were several referendums to decide about the Icesave Icelandic bank debts, center of the country's financial crisis. The first Icesave referendum (Icelandic: Þjóðaratkvæðagreiðsla um Icesave), was held on 6 March 2010.

After the referendum, new negotiations commenced. On 16 February 2011, the Althing agreed to a repayment deal to pay back the full amount starting in 2016, finalising before 2046, with a fixed interest rate of 3%. The Icelandic president once again refused to sign the new deal on 20 February, calling for a new referendum. Thus, a second referendum would be held on 9 April 2011 also resulting in "no" victory with a lesser percentage. After the referendum failed to pass, the British and Dutch governments said that they would take the case to the European courts.

At a session on 28 September 2010, the Althing voted 33–30 to indict the former prime minister Geir Haarde, but not the other ministers, on charges of negligence in office. He stood trial before the Landsdómur, a special court to hear cases alleging misconduct in government office, used for the first time since it was established in the 1905 Constitution.

==== New Icelandic constitution process ====
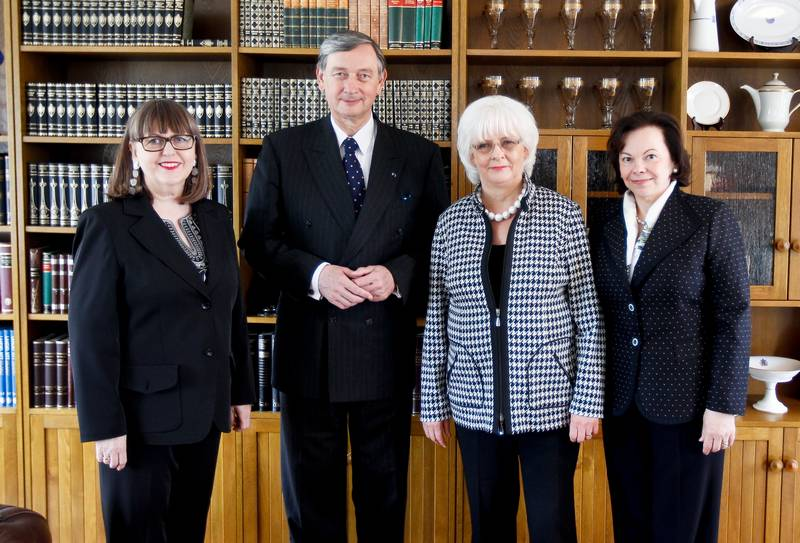
Jóhanna Sigurðardóttir (second from right) and Jónína Leósdóttir (left), on an official visit to Slovenia

Once in power, the left coalition led by Jóhanna—comprising the Social Democratic Alliance, the Left-Green Movement, the Progressive Party and the Liberal Party—inspired largely by the citizen protests, agreed to convene a constitutional assembly to discuss changes to the Constitution, in use since 1905.

Taking its cue from nationwide protests and lobbying efforts by civil organisations, the new governing parties decided that Iceland's citizens should be involved in creating a new constitution and started to debate a bill on 4 November 2009 about that purpose. Parallel to the protests and parliament deliverance, citizens started to unite in grassroots-based think-tanks. A National Forum was organised on 14 November 2009, Þjóðfundur 2009, in the form of an assembly of Icelandic citizens at the Laugardalshöll in Reykjavík, by a group of grassroots citizen movements collectively called "the Anthill". 1,500 people were invited to participate in the assembly; of these, 1,200 were chosen at random from the national registry. On 16 June 2010 the Constitutional Act was finally accepted by parliament and a new Forum was summoned. The Constitutional Act prescribed that the participants of the Forum had to be randomly sampled from the National Population Register. The Forum 2010 came into being due to the efforts of both governing parties and the Anthill group. A seven-member Constitutional Committee, appointed by the parliament, was charged with the supervision of the forum and the presentation of its results, while the organization and facilitation of the National Forum 2010 was done by the Anthill group that had organized the first Forum 2009.

The process continued in the election of 25 people of no political affiliation on 26 October 2010. The Supreme Court of Iceland later invalidated the results of the election on 25 January 2011 following complaints about several faults in how the election was conducted, but the Parliament decided that it was the manner of the election, and not the results, that had been questioned, and also that those 25 elected candidates would be a part of a Constitutional Council and thus the Constitutional change went on.

On 29 July 2011 the draft was presented to the Parliament, which finally agreed in a vote on 24 May 2012, with 35 in favor and 15 against, to organize an advisory referendum on the Constitutional Council's proposal for a new constitution no later than 20 October 2012. The only opposing parliament members were the former governing right party, the Independence Party. Also a proposed referendum on the discontinuing of accession talks with the European Union by some parliamentarians of the governing left coalition was rejected, with 34 votes against and 25 in favor.

==== Women's rights and ban on striptease ====
In 2010, her government banned strip clubs, paying for nudity in restaurants, and other means of employers profiting from employees' nudity – the first such ban in a Western democratic country. Jóhanna commented: "The Nordic countries are leading the way on women's equality, recognizing women as equal citizens rather than commodities for sale." Responding to the policy change, Julie Bindel, a radical feminist, stated while writing for The Guardian that Iceland had become the most feminist country in the world. When asked in 2012 about the most important gender-based problem "today", Jóhanna answered that it was "to fight the pay gap between men and women".

== Personal life ==
Jóhanna married Þorvaldur Steinar Jóhannesson in 1970 and the couple had two sons named Sigurður Egill Þorvaldsson and Davíð Steinar Þorvaldsson (born 1972 and 1977). They were divorced in 1987.

In 2002, she joined in a civil union with Jónína Leósdóttir (born 1954), an author and playwright, in 2002. In 2010, when same-sex marriage was legalised in Iceland, Jóhanna and Jónína changed their civil union into a marriage, thus becoming one of the first same-sex married couples in Iceland.

In 2017, she released a biography entitled Minn tími ("My Time"). The biography covers one of the most contentious periods in Icelandic history – from the financial crash of autumn 2008, through protests and emergency elections the following year, and the difficult recovery period that followed leading Iceland's left wing government.

== See also ==
- List of elected and appointed female heads of state and government
- List of the first LGBT holders of political offices
- List of openly LGBT heads of government

Political offices
Preceded by Alexander Stefánsson	Minister of Social Affairs; 1987–1994	Succeeded by Guðmundur Árni Stefánsson
Preceded by Magnús Stefánsson as Minister of Social Affairs	Minister of Social Affairs and Social Security; 2007–2009	Succeeded by Ásta Ragnheiður Jóhannesdóttir
Preceded by Siv Friðleifsdóttir as Minister of Health and Social Security	Minister of Social Affairs and Social Security; 2007–2009	Succeeded by Ásta Ragnheiður Jóhannesdóttir
Preceded by Geir Haarde	Prime Minister of Iceland; 2009–2013	Succeeded by Sigmundur Davíð Gunnlaugsson
Party political offices
Preceded by Ingibjörg Sólrún Gísladóttir	Leader of the Social Democratic Alliance; 2009–2013	Succeeded by Árni Páll Árnason
