= Svanfríður Jónasdóttir =

Icelandic politician (born 1951)

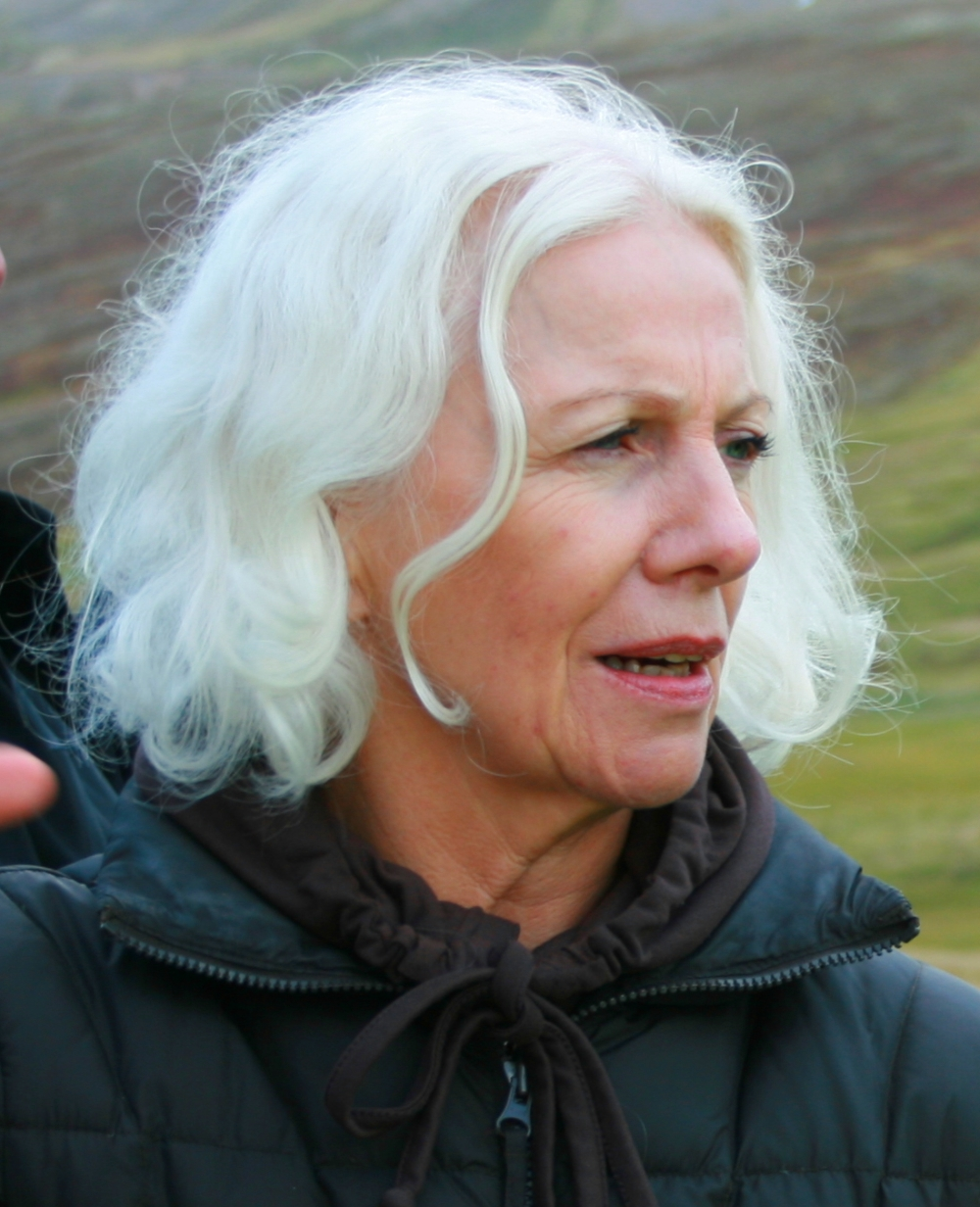

Member of the Icelandic Parliament
- In office 1995–2003

Mayor of Dalvíkurbyggð, Iceland
- In office 1982–1990

Mayor of Dalvíkurbyggð
- In office 1994–1998

Mayor of Dalvíkurbyggð
- In office 2006–2014

Personal details
- Born: Svanfríður Inga Jónasdóttir; 10 November 1951 (age 74) Keflavik, Iceland
- Party: Social Democratic Alliance
- Spouse: Jóhann Antonsson
- Children: Three sons
- Education: Iceland University of Education

Svanfríður Jónasdóttir (born 1951) is an Icelandic teacher, former member of the Althing, the national parliament of Iceland (1995–2003), and former mayor of Dalvíkurbyggð, a small municipality in the north of Iceland.

== Early life and education ==
Svanfríður Inga Jónasdóttir was born on 10 November 1951 in Keflavík, in the southwest of Iceland. Her parents were Jónas Sigurbjörnsson, an engineer, and his wife Elín Jakobsdóttir, a construction worker. She graduated as a teacher from the Teachers College of Iceland in 1972 and with a full degree from the same college a year later. She completed a diploma from the Iceland University of Education in 2004, a master's degree in pedagogy from the same school in 2005, studying the learning interests of people with little formal education, and she studied applied gender studies at the University of Iceland in 2014. In 1973 she married Björn Grímsson but they divorced soon after. In 1976 she married Jóhann Antonsson. She has three sons: Pétur, Kristján Eldjárn, and Jónas Tryggvi.

== Career ==
Jónasdóttir was a teacher at Dalvík Primary School between 1974 and 1988 and 1991 and 1995. She founded a sewing workshop, Gerpla, in Dalvík in 1986 and took part in its operation until 1988. After leaving parliament she participated in the construction of a study centre in Dalvík in 2004-2006 and was a journalist from 2005-2006. She has served on various committees and boards, especially in the fields of employment, regional affairs and education and culture. She was on the board of the Municipal Debt Fund (2006–2014); chair of the board of the Association of Fisheries Municipalities (2012–2014); chair of the board of the research institute of the University of Akureyri and member of the university council; and on the board of Icelandic Energy Research (ÍSOR) from 2003 to 2015. Jónasdóttir is also a frequent contributor to newspapers and magazines. In 2015, she founded a consulting company together with two other former mayors. In 2016 she became project manager at the Eyjafjörður Lifelong Learning Centre.

== Political career ==
Jónasdóttir was mayor of Dalvíkurbyggð between 1982 and 1990 and 1994 and 1998. She was also president of the town council in 1988 and in 1994–1995. From 1988 to 1991 she worked as an assistant to Ólafur Ragnar Grímsson, a future president of Iceland who was, at the time, minister of finance. From 1987 to 1989 she was vice-chairman of the People's Alliance a socialist political party, which joined forces with other parties to form the Social Democratic Alliance in 1998. She was elected to the Althing in 1995 and was chair of the People's Alliance parliamentary party in 1995 and 1996. She was re-elected as a Social Democratic Alliance member in 1999, serving until 2003. After completing her parliamentary terms, she was again mayor of Dalvíkurbyggð, between 2006 and 2014.

== Awards and honours ==
In 2014 Jónasdóttir received the Knight's Cross of the Order of the Falcon for her work in local government.
