= Margrét Frímannsdóttir =

Icelandic politician (born 1954)

Margrét Frímannsdóttir (born 29 May 1954) is an Icelandic former politician and party leader. A member of the Althing between 1987 and 2007, she first represented the People's Alliance and later the Social Democratic Alliance (SDA).

== Biography ==
Frímannsdóttir graduated in statistics from Selfoss School of Computer Science and for a time studied at Fjölbrautaskóli Suðurlands. She worked as a shop assistant, teacher at the Stokkseyri Primary School and as head of Stokkseyri district (1982–1990).

Frímannsdóttir was first elected to the Althing for the People's Alliance in the Southern constituency in 1987. From 1999 she was part of the Social Democratic Alliance, serving in the parliament until 2007. She served as chair of the parliamentary caucus of the People's Alliance (1988–1992) and leader of the party (1995–1999).

Frímannsdóttir was leader of the SDA at the 1999 elections, and subsequently was the party's vice president (2000–2003) and chair of the parliamentary caucus (2004–2006).

Between 2009 and 2015 she was the director of the prison at Litla-Hraun.

Frímannsdóttir maintains an interest in horticulture.
