= Árni Johnsen =

Icelandic politician (1944–2023)

- Born: 1 March 1944; Vestmannaeyjar, Kingdom of Iceland
- Died: 6 June 2023 (aged 79); Vestmannaeyjar, Iceland
- Occupations: Journalist, politician

Member of Alþingi
- In office 1983 – 1987; 1991 – 2001; 2007 – 2013

Personal details
- Party: Independence Party

Árni Johnsen (1 March 1944 – 6 June 2023) was an Icelandic journalist, politician, musician and athlete from Vestmannaeyjar, who represented the Independence Party in the Althing as a member of the South Constituency.

== Early life ==
Árni was born in Vestmannaeyjar to Poul C. Kanélas, an American soldier of Greek ancestry who was stationed in Iceland during World War II, and Ingibjörg Á. Johnsen. In his youth, Árni competed in track and field. In 1965, he ran the 100 meter dash in a personal best 11.0 seconds.

== Career ==
Árni was a journalist for Morgunblaðið from 1967 to 1991 and also worked as a producer for RÚV.

Árni was first elected to Alþingi in 1983. He served as a debuty member of Alþingi from 1988 to 1991 and a full time member from 1991 until his resignation on 19 July 2001 after it was revealed he had used funds from the National Theatre of Iceland to purchase goods for his personal use. In 2002 he was convicted of paying for personal property using government accounts and sentenced to two years in prison. After his release, he was re-elected in 2007 and served until 2013.

Outside of his journalist and political career, Árni wrote several interview books, collected jokes and verses from members of parliament and published them in several books. He wrote music, played his own songs and other people's songs on records and annually led singalongs at the festival Þjóðhátíð.

== Death ==
Árni died at the Healthcare Institution of South Iceland in Vestmannaeyjar on 6 June 2023, at the age of 79.
