= Kristján Pálsson =

Icelandic politician (born 1944)

Personal details
- Born: 1 December 1944 (age 81) Reykjavík, Iceland
- Party: Independence Party; Independent
- Children: 4

Kristján Pálsson (born 1 December 1944) is an Icelandic former politician. He was a member of parliament from 1995 to 2003 for the Independence Party. In 2003, he resigned from the party and served out the remainder of his term as an independent.
