= Páll Bragi Pétursson =

Icelandic politician (1937–2020)

Páll Bragi Pétursson (17 March 1937 – 23 November 2020) was an Icelandic politician and former minister for social affairs from April 1995 to May 2003. He was President of the Nordic Council in 1985 and 1990.
