= National Awakening (Iceland) =

National Awakening Þjóðvaki – Hreyfing Fólksins
- Leader: Jóhanna Sigurðardóttir
- Founded: 1994
- Dissolved: 2000
- Split from: Social Democratic Party
- Merged into: Social Democratic Alliance
- Ideology: Social democracy
- Political position: Centre-left

Election symbol
- J

National Awakening – People's Movement (Icelandic: Þjóðvaki – Hreyfing Fólksins, ÞPM) was a social-democratic political party in Iceland. The party was founded around Jóhanna Sigurðardóttir, future Prime Minister of Iceland.

== History ==
The party was formed in 1994 in preparation for the 1995 parliamentary election; one of the co-founders was Jóhanna Sigurðardóttir after she lost an internal election for the leadership of the Social Democratic Party. She was joined by members of the People's Alliance. In the 1995 parliamentary elections, the party won 7.2% of the vote and four seats.

On 2 October 1996, its members of parliament joined the Social Democratic Party to form a unified parliamentary group. For the 1999 parliamentary elections it formed the United Front electoral alliance with the Social Democratic Party and the People's Alliance and the Women's List, winning 30% of the vote and 20 seats. In 2000, the parties merged with to form the Social Democratic Alliance.

== Electoral results ==
Election	Votes	%	Seats	+/–	Position	Government
1995	11,806	7.2	4 / 63	▲4	▲5th	Opposition
