= Althing =

National legislature of Iceland

Coordinates: 64°08′48″N 21°56′25″W

Icelandic Parliament Alþingi Íslendinga
- Members

Type
- Type: Unicameral

History
- Founded: 930; 1096 years ago; 1800 (defunct); 1845; 181 years ago (restored)

Leadership
- Speaker: Þórunn Sveinbjarnardóttir, Social Democratic Alliance since 4 February 2025

Structure
- Seats: 63
- Political groups: Government (34) Social Democratic Alliance (15) Viðreisn (10) People's (9) Confidence and Supply (2) Independent (2) Opposition (27) Independence (14) Centre (8) Progressive (5)

Elections
- Voting system: Open list proportional representation with a 5% electoral threshold for leveling seats
- Last election: 30 November 2024
- Next election: By 30 November 2028

Meeting place
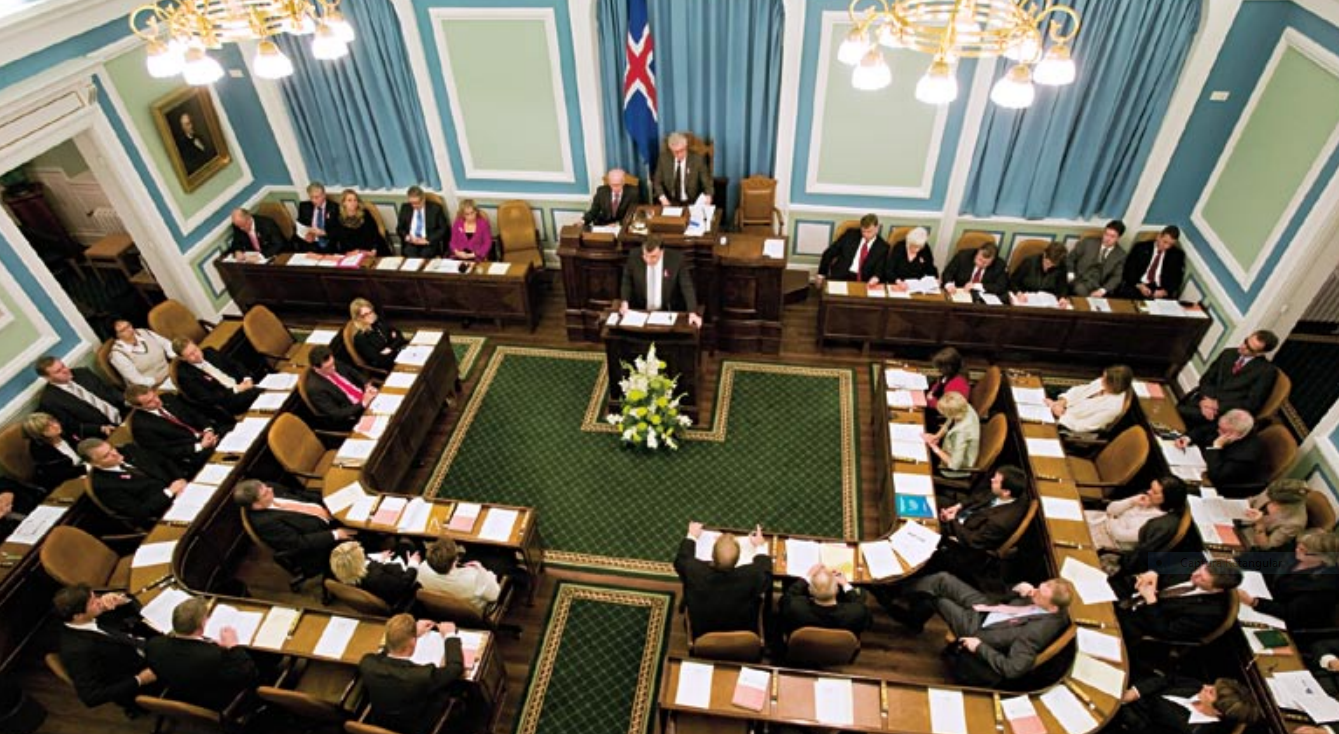
- Alþingishúsið, Reykjavík

Website
- www.althingi.is

The Alþingi (Icelandic: [ˈalˌθiɲcɪ]; Icelandic for 'general meeting', anglicised as Althing or Althingi) is the national legislature of Iceland, which is also known in the English language as the Icelandic Parliament or as the Parliament of Iceland. Established in 930, it is the oldest legislature in the world.

The original Althing was founded in 930 at Þingvellir ('thing fields' or 'assembly fields', anglicised as Thingvellir), about 45 kilometres (28 mi) east of what later became the country's capital, Reykjavík. The present parliament building, the Alþingishús, was built in 1881 of hewn Icelandic stone. The unicameral parliament has 63 members, and is elected every four years based on party-list proportional representation. Þórunn Sveinbjarnardóttir became speaker of the Althing in February 2025.

After Iceland's union with Norway in 1262, the Althing lost its legislative power, which was not restored until 1904, when Iceland gained home rule from Denmark. For 641 years, the Althing did not serve as the parliament of Iceland; ultimate power rested with the Norwegian, and subsequently, Danish throne. Even after Iceland's union with Norway in 1262, the Althing still held its sessions at Þingvellir until 1800, when it was discontinued. It was restored in 1845 by royal decree and moved to Reykjavík. The restored unicameral legislature first came together in 1845, and after 1874 operated in two chambers with an additional third chamber taking on a greater role as the decades passed, until 1991, when Althing became once again unicameral.

The constitution of Iceland provides for six electoral constituencies with the possibility of an increase to seven. The constituency boundaries and the number of seats allocated to each constituency are fixed by legislation. No constituency can be represented by fewer than six seats. Furthermore, each party with more than 5% of the national vote is allocated seats based on its proportion of the national vote in order that the number of members in parliament for each political party should be more or less proportional to its overall electoral support. If the number of voters represented by each member of the Althing in one constituency would be less than half of the comparable ratio in another constituency, the Icelandic National Electoral Commission is tasked with altering the allocation of seats to reduce the difference.

== Historical background ==
=== Foundation: c. 930–1262 ===
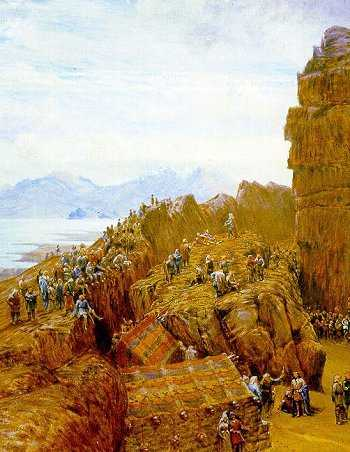
19th-century rendering of the Law Rock in Þingvellir

The Althing claims to be the longest-running parliament in the world. Its establishment as an outdoor assembly or thing held on the plains of Þingvellir ('Thing Fields' or 'Assembly Fields') from about 930, laid the foundation for an independent national existence in Iceland. To begin with, the Althing was a general assembly of the Icelandic Commonwealth, where the country's most powerful leaders (goðar) met to decide on legislation and dispense justice. All free men could attend the assemblies, which were usually the main social event of the year and drew large crowds of farmers and their families, parties involved in legal disputes, traders, craftsmen, storytellers, and travellers. Those attending the assembly lived in temporary camps (búðir) during the session. The centre of the gathering was the Lögberg, or Law Rock, a rocky outcrop on which the Lawspeaker (lögsögumaður) took his seat as the presiding official of the assembly. His responsibilities included reciting aloud the laws in effect at the time. It was his duty to proclaim the procedural law of the Althing to those attending the assembly each year.

The Gulathing Law was adopted in 930 at the first Althing, introduced by Úlfljótr, who had spent three years in Norway studying their laws. The Icelandic laws conferred a privileged status on the Danes, Swedes and Norwegians.

According to Njáls saga, the Althing declared Christianity as the official religion in 1000. By the summer of 1000, the leaders of Iceland had agreed that prosecuting close relatives for blaspheming the old gods was obligatory. Iceland was in the midst of unrest from the spread of Christianity that was introduced by travelers and missionaries sent by the Norwegian king Olaf Tryggvason. The outbreak of warfare in Denmark and Norway prompted Thorgeir Ljosvetningagodi, a pagan and chieftain of the Althing, to propose "one law and one religion" to rule over the whole of Iceland, making baptism and conversion to Christianity required by law.

==== Lögrétta ====
Public addresses on matters of importance were delivered at the Law Rock and there the assembly was called to order and dissolved. The Lögrétta, the legislative section of the assembly, was its most powerful institution. It comprised the 39 district Chieftains (pl. goðar) plus nine additional members and the Lawspeaker. As the legislative section of the Althing, the Lögrétta took a stand on legal conflicts, adopted new laws and granted exemptions to existing laws. The Althing of old also performed a judicial function and heard legal disputes in addition to the spring assemblies held in each district. After the country had been divided into four-quarters around 965, a court of 36 judges (fjórðungsdómur) was established for each of them at the Althing. Another court (fimmtardómur) was established early in the 11th century. It served as a supreme court of sorts, and assumed the function of hearing cases left unsettled by the other courts. It comprised 48 judges appointed by the goðar of Lögrétta.

=== Monarchy: 1262–1800 ===
When the Icelanders submitted to the authority of the Norwegian king under the terms of the "Old Covenant" (Gamli sáttmáli) in 1262, the function of the Althing changed. The organization of the Commonwealth came to an end and the rule of the country by goðar ceased. Executive power now rested with the king and his officials, the Royal Commissioners (hirðstjórar) and District Commissioners (sýslumenn). As before, the Lögrétta, now comprising 36 members, continued to be its principal institution and shared formal legislative power with the king. Laws adopted by the Lögrétta were subject to royal assent and, conversely, if the king initiated legislation, the Althing had to give its consent. The Lawspeaker was replaced by two legal administrators, called lögmenn.

Towards the end of the 14th century, royal succession brought both Norway and Iceland under the control of the Danish monarchy. With the introduction of absolute monarchy in Denmark, the Icelanders relinquished their autonomy to the Crown, including the right to initiate and consent to legislation. After that, the Althing served almost exclusively as a court of law until the year 1800.

=== High Court: 1800–1845 ===
The Althing was disbanded by royal decree in 1800. A new High Court, established by this same decree and located in Reykjavík, took over the functions of Lögrétta. The three appointed judges first convened in Hólavallarskóli on 10 August 1801. The High Court was to hold regular sessions and function as the court of highest instance in the country. It operated until 1920, when the Supreme Court of Iceland was established.

=== Consultative assembly: 1845–1874 ===
A royal decree providing for the establishment of a new Althing was issued on 8 March 1843. Elections were held the following year and the assembly finally met on 1 July 1845 in Reykjavík. Some Icelandic nationalists (the Fjölnir group) did not want Reykjavík as the location for the newly established Althing due to the perception that the city was too influenced by Danes. Jón Sigurðsson claimed that the situating of the Althing in Reykjavík would help make the city Icelandic.

It comprised 26 members sitting in a single chamber. One member was elected in each of 20 electoral districts and six "royally nominated Members" were appointed by the king. Suffrage was, following the Danish model, limited to males of substantial means and at least 25 years of age, which to begin with meant only about 5% of the population. A regular session lasted four weeks and could be extended if necessary. During this period, the Althing acted merely as a consultative body for the Crown. It examined proposed legislation and individual members could raise questions for discussion. Draft legislation submitted by the government was given two readings, an introductory one and a final one. Proposals which were adopted were called petitions. The new Althing made a number of improvements to legislation and to the administration of the country.

=== Legislative assembly from 1874 ===
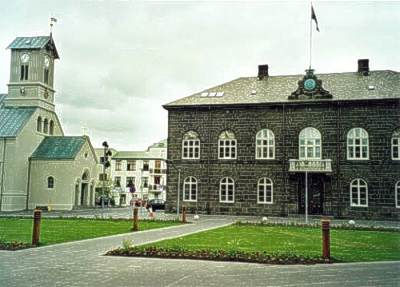
Parliament House (right), at Austurvöllur in Reykjavík, built 1880–1881

The Constitution of 1874 granted to the Althing joint legislative power with the Crown in matters of exclusive Icelandic concern. At the same time, the National Treasury acquired powers of taxation and financial allocation. The king retained the right to veto legislation and often, on the advice of his ministers, refused to consent to legislation adopted by the Althing. The number of members of the Althing was increased to 36, 30 of them elected in general elections in eight single-member constituencies and 11 double-member constituencies, the other six appointed by the Crown as before. The Althing was now divided into an upper chamber, known as the Efri deild and a lower chamber, known as the Neðri deild. Six elected members and the six appointed ones sat in the upper chamber, which meant that the latter could prevent legislation from being passed by acting as a bloc. Twenty-four elected representatives sat in the lower chamber. From 1874 until 1915 ad hoc committees were appointed. After 1915 seven standing committees were elected by each of the chambers. Regular sessions of the Althing convened every other year. A supplementary session was first held in 1886, and these became more frequent in the 20th century. The Althing met from 1881 in the newly built Parliament House. The Governor-General (landshöfðingi) was the highest representative of the government in Iceland and was responsible to the Advisor for Iceland (Íslandsráðgjafi) in Copenhagen.

=== Home rule ===
A constitutional amendment, confirmed on 3 October 1903, granted the Icelanders home rule and parliamentary government. Hannes Hafstein was appointed as the Icelandic minister on 1 February 1904 who was answerable to parliament. The minister had to have the support of the majority of members of the Althing; in the case of a vote of no confidence, he would have to step down. Under the constitutional amendment of 1903, the number of members was increased by four, to a total of forty. Elections to the Althing had traditionally been public – voters declared aloud which of the candidates they supported. In 1908, the secret ballot was adopted, with ballot papers on which the names of the candidates were printed. A single election day for the entire country was at the same time made mandatory. When the Constitution was amended in 1915, the royally nominated members of the Althing were replaced by six national representatives elected by proportional representation for the entire country.

=== Personal union ===
The Act of Union (which took effect on 1 December 1918) made Iceland a state in personal union with the Kingdom of Denmark. It was set to expire after 25 years, when either state could choose to leave the union. The Althing was granted unrestricted legislative power. In 1920, the number of members of the Althing was increased to 42. Since 1945, the Althing has customarily assembled in the autumn. With the Constitutional Act of 1934, the number of members was increased by seven and the system of national representatives abolished in favour of one providing for eleven seats used to equalize discrepancies between the parties' popular vote and the number of seats they received in the Althing, raising the number of members of the Althing to 49. In 1934, the voting age was also lowered to 21. Further changes in 1942 provided for an additional three members and introduced proportional representation in the double-member constituencies. The constituencies were then 28 in number: 21 single-member constituencies; six double-member constituencies; and Reykjavík, which elected eight members. With the additional eleven equalization seats, the total number of members was thus 52.

=== Republic ===
The union with Iceland was effectively made inoperable when the Kingdom of Denmark was occupied by Germany on 9 April 1940. On the following day, the Althing passed two resolutions, investing the Icelandic cabinet with the power of Head of State and declaring that Iceland would accept full responsibility for both foreign policy and coastal surveillance. A year later, the Althing adopted a law creating the position of Regent to represent the Crown. This position continued until the Act of Union was repealed, and the Republic of Iceland established, at a session of the Althing held at Þingvellir on 17 June 1944.

In 1959, the system of electoral districts was changed completely. The country was divided into eight constituencies with proportional representation in each, in addition to the previous eleven equalization seats. The total number of members elected was 60. In 1968, the Althing approved the lowering of the voting age to 20 years. A further amendment to the Constitution in 1984 increased the number of members to 63 and reduced the voting age to 18 years. Further major changes were introduced in the Althing in May 1991: the two chambers, by that point having identical election methods and identical membership, were merged into a single chamber, thus introducing unicameralism. By a constitutional amendment of June 1999, implemented in May 2003, the constituency system was again changed. The number of constituencies was cut from eight to six; constituency boundaries were to be fixed by law. There are currently twelve standing committees.

=== Recent and future elections ===
A full term of parliament is four years but a snap election may be called earlier.

- 2013 Icelandic parliamentary election
- 2016 Icelandic parliamentary election
- 2017 Icelandic parliamentary election
- 2021 Icelandic parliamentary election
- 2024 Icelandic parliamentary election

== 5% threshold ==
The 5% threshold means that for a party to receive any seats in parliament, it needs to receive at least 5% of the total vote. If a party is below 5%, then the seats it would have received with that share are distributed amongst the other parties that are above 5% using a leveling system.

== Results of 2024 general election ==
Party	Votes	%	Seats	+/–
Social Democratic Alliance	44,091	20.75	15	+9
Independence Party	41,143	19.36	14	–2
Viðreisn	33,606	15.82	11	+6
People's Party	29,288	13.78	10	+4
Centre Party	25,700	12.10	8	+5
Progressive Party	16,578	7.80	5	–8
Socialist Party	8,422	3.96	0	0
Pirate Party	6,411	3.02	0	–6
Left-Green Movement	4,974	2.34	0	–8
Democratic Party	2,215	1.04	0	New
Responsible Future	42	0.02	0	0
Total	212,470	100.00	63	0
Valid votes	212,470	98.72		
Invalid votes	308	0.14		
Blank votes	2,438	1.13		
Total votes	215,216	100.00		
Registered voters/turnout	268,422	80.18		
Source: MBL

Popular vote
S	20.75%
D	19.36%
C	15.82%
F	13.78%
M	12.10%
B	7.80%
J	3.96%
P	3.02%
V	2.34%
Others	1.02%

Parliamentary seats
S	23.81%
D	22.22%
C	17.46%
F	15.87%
M	12.70%
B	7.94%

== Historical composition ==
=== Republic of Iceland (Since 1944) ===
People's Unity Party – Socialist Party / People's Alliance / Social Democratic Party / Alliance of Social Democrats / VG / F / KL / S / J / Union of Liberals and Leftists / A / Others / Citizens' Movement / P / M / C / F / B / D / S
1946	10 / 9 / 13 / 20
1949	9 / 7 / 17 / 19
1953	7 / 6 / 2 / 16 / 21
1956	8 / 8 / 17 / 19
1959.06	7 / 6 / 19 / 20
1959.10	10 / 9 / 17 / 24
1963	9 / 8 / 19 / 24
1967	10 / 9 / 18 / 23
1971	10 / 6 / 5 / 17 / 22
1974	11 / 5 / 2 / 17 / 25
1978	14 / 14 / 12 / 20
1979	11 / 10 / 1 / 17 / 21
1983	10 / 6 / 4 / 3 / 14 / 23
1987	8 / 10 / 6 / 1 / 13 / 18 / 7
1991	9 / 10 / 5 / 13 / 26
1995	9 / 7 / 3 / 4 / 15 / 25
1999	6 / 17 / 2 / 12 / 26
2003	5 / 20 / 4 / 12 / 22
2007	9 / 18 / 4 / 7 / 25
2009	14 / 20 / 4 / 9 / 16
2013	7 / 9 / 6 / 3 / 19 / 19
2016	10 / 3 / 4 / 10 / 7 / 8 / 21
2017	11 / 4 / 7 / 6 / 7 / 4 / 8 / 16
2021	8 / 6 / 6 / 6 / 3 / 5 / 13 / 16
2024	10 / 15 / 8 / 11 / 5 / 14

== Members (1980s–present) ==
- List of members of the parliament of Iceland, 1983–1987
- List of members of the parliament of Iceland, 1987–1991
- List of members of the parliament of Iceland, 1991–1995
- List of members of the Althing, 1995–1999
- List of members of the Althing, 1999–2003
- List of members of the Althing, 2003–2007
- List of members of the Althing, 2007–2009
- List of members of the Althing, 2009–2013
- List of members of the Althing, 2013–2016
- List of members of the Althing, 2016–2017
- List of members of the Althing, 2017–2021
- List of members of the Althing, 2021–2024
- List of members of the Althing, 2024–2028

== See also ==
- Constituencies of Iceland
- Women in Iceland#Women's suffrage
- List of parliamentary assemblies of Iceland
- List of speakers of the Parliament of Iceland
- List of speakers of the Upper House of the Althing (until 1991 when the Althing became unicameral)
- List of speakers of the Lower House of the Althing (until 1991 when the Althing became unicameral)
