= List of female cabinet ministers of Iceland =

This is a list of female cabinet ministers of Iceland.

== List ==
Incumbent	Minister	Took office	Left office	Party	Cabinet
Prime Minister
Jóhanna Sigurðardóttir	Prime Minister	1 February 2009	23 May 2013	SDA	Jóhanna Sigurðardóttir I; Jóhanna Sigurðardóttir II
Katrín Jakobsdóttir	Prime Minister	30 November 2017	9 April 2024	LGM	Katrín Jakobsdóttir I; Katrín Jakobsdóttir II
Kristrún Frostadóttir	Prime Minister	21 December 2024	Present	SDA	Kristrún Frostadóttir
Minister of Education, Science and Culture
Ragnhildur Helgadóttir	Minister of Education, Science and Culture	26 May 1983	16 October 1985	IP	Steingrímur Hermannsson I
Þorgerður Katrín Gunnarsdóttir	Minister of Education, Science and Culture	31 December 2003	1 February 2009	IP	Davíð Oddsson IV; Halldór Ásgrímsson; Geir Haarde I; Geir Haarde II
Katrín Jakobsdóttir	Minister of Education, Science and Culture	1 February 2009	23 May 2013	LGM	Jóhanna Sigurðardóttir I; Jóhanna Sigurðardóttir II
Minister for the Environment and Natural Resources
Siv Friðleifsdóttir	Minister for the Environment	28 May 1999	3 May 2003	PP	Davíð Oddsson III
Sigríður Anna Þórðardóttir	Minister for the Environment	15 September 2004	15 June 2006	IP	Halldór Ásgrímsson
Jónína Bjartmarz	Minister for the Environment	15 June 2006	24 May 2007	PP	Geir Haarde I
Þórunn Sveinbjarnardóttir	Minister for the Environment	24 May 2007	1 February 2009	SDA	Geir Haarde II
Kolbrún Halldórsdóttir	Minister for the Environment	1 February 2009	10 May 2009	LGM	Jóhanna Sigurðardóttir I
Svandís Svavarsdóttir	Minister for the Environment	10 May 2009	1 September 2012	LGM	Jóhanna Sigurðardóttir II
Svandís Svavarsdóttir	Minister for the Environment and Natural Resources	1 September 2012	23 May 2013	LGM	Jóhanna Sigurðardóttir II
Minister of Finance and Economic Affairs
Oddný Guðbjörg Harðardóttir	Minister of Finance	31 December 2011	1 September 2012	SDA	Jóhanna Sigurðardóttir II
Oddný Guðbjörg Harðardóttir	Minister of Finance and Economic Affairs	1 September 2012	23 May 2013	SDA	Jóhanna Sigurðardóttir II
Minister for Foreign Affairs
Valgerður Sverrisdóttir	Minister for Foreign Affairs	15 June 2006	24 May 2007	PP	Geir Haarde I
Ingibjörg Sólrún Gísladóttir	Minister for Foreign Affairs	24 May 2007	1 February 2009	SDA	Geir Haarde II
Þorgerður Katrín Gunnarsdóttir	Minister for Foreign Affairs	21 December 2024	Present	LRP	Kristrún Frostadóttir
Minister of the Interior
Auður Auðuns	Minister of Justice and Ecclesiastical Affairs	10 October 1970	14 July 1971	IP	Jóhann Hafstein
Sólveig Guðrún Pétursdóttir	Minister of Justice and Ecclesiastical Affairs	28 May 1999	23 May 2003	IP	Davíð Oddsson III
Ragna Árnadóttir	Minister of Justice and Ecclesiastical Affairs	1 February 2009	2 September 2010	independent	Jóhanna Sigurðardóttir I; Jóhanna Sigurðardóttir II
Hanna Birna Kristjánsdóttir	Minister of the Interior	23 May 2013	4 December 2014	IP	Sigmundur Davíð Gunnlaugsson
Minister of Industries and Innovation
Valgerður Sverrisdóttir	Minister of Industry	31 December 1999	15 June 2006	PP	Davíð Oddsson III; Davíð Oddsson IV; Halldór Ásgrímsson
Valgerður Sverrisdóttir	Minister of Commerce	31 December 1999	15 June 2006	PP	Davíð Oddsson III; Davíð Oddsson IV; Halldór Ásgrímsson
Katrín Júlíusdóttir	Minister of Industry, Energy and Tourism	10 May 2009	1 September 2012	SDA	Jóhanna Sigurðardóttir II
Ragnheiður Elín Árnadóttir	Minister of Industry and Commerce	23 May 2013	11 January 2017	IP	Sigmundur Davíð Gunnlaugsson
Minister of Welfare
Ragnhildur Helgadóttir	Minister of Health and Social Security	16 October 1985	8 July 1987	IP	Steingrímur Hermannsson I
Jóhanna Sigurðardóttir	Minister of Social Affairs	8 July 1987	24 June 1994	SDP	Þorsteinn Pálsson; Steingrímur Hermannsson II; Steingrímur Hermannsson III; Davíð Oddsson I
Rannveig Guðmundsdóttir	Minister of Social Affairs	12 November 1994	23 April 1995	SDP	Davíð Oddsson I
Ingibjörg Pálmadóttir	Minister of Health and Social Security	23 April 1995	14 April 2001	PP	Davíð Oddsson II
Jóhanna Sigurðardóttir	Minister of Social Affairs	24 May 2007	1 February 2009	SDA	Geir Haarde II
Ásta Ragnheiður Jóhannesdóttir	Minister of Social Affairs and Social Security	1 February 2009	10 May 2009	SDA	Jóhanna Sigurðardóttir I
Álfheiður Ingadóttir	Minister of Health	1 October 2009	2 September 2010	LGM	Jóhanna Sigurðardóttir II
Eygló Harðardóttir	Minister of Social Affairs and Housing	23 May 2013	11 January 2017	PP	Sigmundur Davíð Gunnlaugsson

== See also ==
- Government of Iceland
- Cabinet of Iceland
- Politics of Iceland
