= Minister for Nordic Cooperation (Iceland) =

Iceland's Minister for Nordic Cooperation is a cabinet minister who takes on this role in addition to his or her departmental responsibilities.

The Minister for Nordic Cooperation is responsible for coordinating the activities of Iceland within the Nordic Council. The minister is assisted by a Secretariat for Nordic Cooperation, under the ultimate responsibility of the Prime Minister.

== List ==
Minister		Took office	Left office	Party	Cabinet	Other role
	Matthías Árni Mathiesen	8 July 1987	28 September 1988	IP	Þorsteinn Pálsson	Minister of Communications
	Jón Sigurðsson	28 September 1988	22 May 1989	SDP	Steingrímur Hermannsson (2)	Minister of Industry; Minister of Commerce
|	Edvard Júlíus Sólnes	10 September 1989	23 April 1991	CP	Steingrímur Hermannsson (3)	Minister of Statistics Iceland
|	Edvard Júlíus Sólnes	10 September 1989	23 April 1991	CP	Steingrímur Hermannsson (3)	Minister of Statistics Iceland; Minister for the Environment
	Eiður Svanberg Guðnason	13 May 1991	14 June 1993	SDP	Davíð Oddsson (1)	Minister for the Environment
	Sighvatur Kristinn Björgvinsson	14 June 1993	23 April 1995	SDP	Davíð Oddsson (1)	Minister of Commerce and Industry
	Sighvatur Kristinn Björgvinsson	14 June 1993	23 April 1995	SDP	Davíð Oddsson (1)	Minister of Commerce and Industry; Minister of Health and Social Security
	Halldór Ásgrímsson	16 May 1995	28 May 1999	PP	Davíð Oddsson (2)	Minister for Foreign Affairs
	Siv Friðleifsdóttir	28 May 1999	24 September 2004	PP	Davíð Oddsson (3)	Minister for the Environment
	Siv Friðleifsdóttir	28 May 1999	24 September 2004	PP	Davíð Oddsson (4)	Minister for the Environment
	Valgerður Sverrisdóttir	24 September 2004	27 September 2005	PP	Halldór Ásgrímsson	Minister of Industry and Commerce
	Sigríður Anna Þórðardóttir	27 September 2005	15 June 2006	IP	Halldór Ásgrímsson	Minister for the Environment
	Jónína Bjartmarz	15 June 2006	24 May 2007	PP	Geir Haarde (1)	Minister for the Environment
	Össur Skarphéðinsson	24 May 2007	9 June 2008	SDA	Geir Haarde (2)	Minister of Industry
	Björgvin G. Sigurðsson	9 June 2008	1 February 2009	SDA	Geir Haarde (2)	Minister of Business Affairs
	Kolbrún Halldórsdóttir	1 February 2009	10 May 2009	LG	Jóhanna Sigurðardóttir (1)	Minister for the Environment
	Katrín Jakobsdóttir	10 May 2009	23 May 2013	LG	Jóhanna Sigurðardóttir (2)	Minister of Education, Science and Culture
	Eygló Harðardóttir	30 September 2013	11 January 2017	PP	Sigmundur Davíð Gunnlaugsson	Minister of Social Affairs and Housing
	Eygló Harðardóttir	30 September 2013	11 January 2017	PP	Sigurður Ingi Jóhannsson	Minister of Social Affairs and Housing
	Kristján Þór Júlíusson	24 January 2017	30 November 2017	IP	Bjarni Benediktsson	Minister of Education, Science and Culture
	Sigurður Ingi Jóhannsson	30 November 2017	28 November 2021	PP	Katrín Jakobsdóttir (1)	Minister for the Environment and Natural Resources
	Guðmundur Ingi Guðbrandsson	28 November 2021	17 October 2024	LG	Katrín Jakobsdóttir (2)	Minister of Social Affairs and the Labour Market
	Logi Einarsson	23 December 2024	present	SDA	Kristrún Frostadóttir	Minister of Culture, Innovation and Higher Education

== See also ==
- Minister for Nordic Cooperation (Denmark)
- Minister for Nordic Cooperation (Finland)
- Minister for Nordic Cooperation (Sweden)
