= First cabinet of Davíð Oddsson =

Government of Iceland from 1991 to 1995

- 33rd Cabinet of Iceland

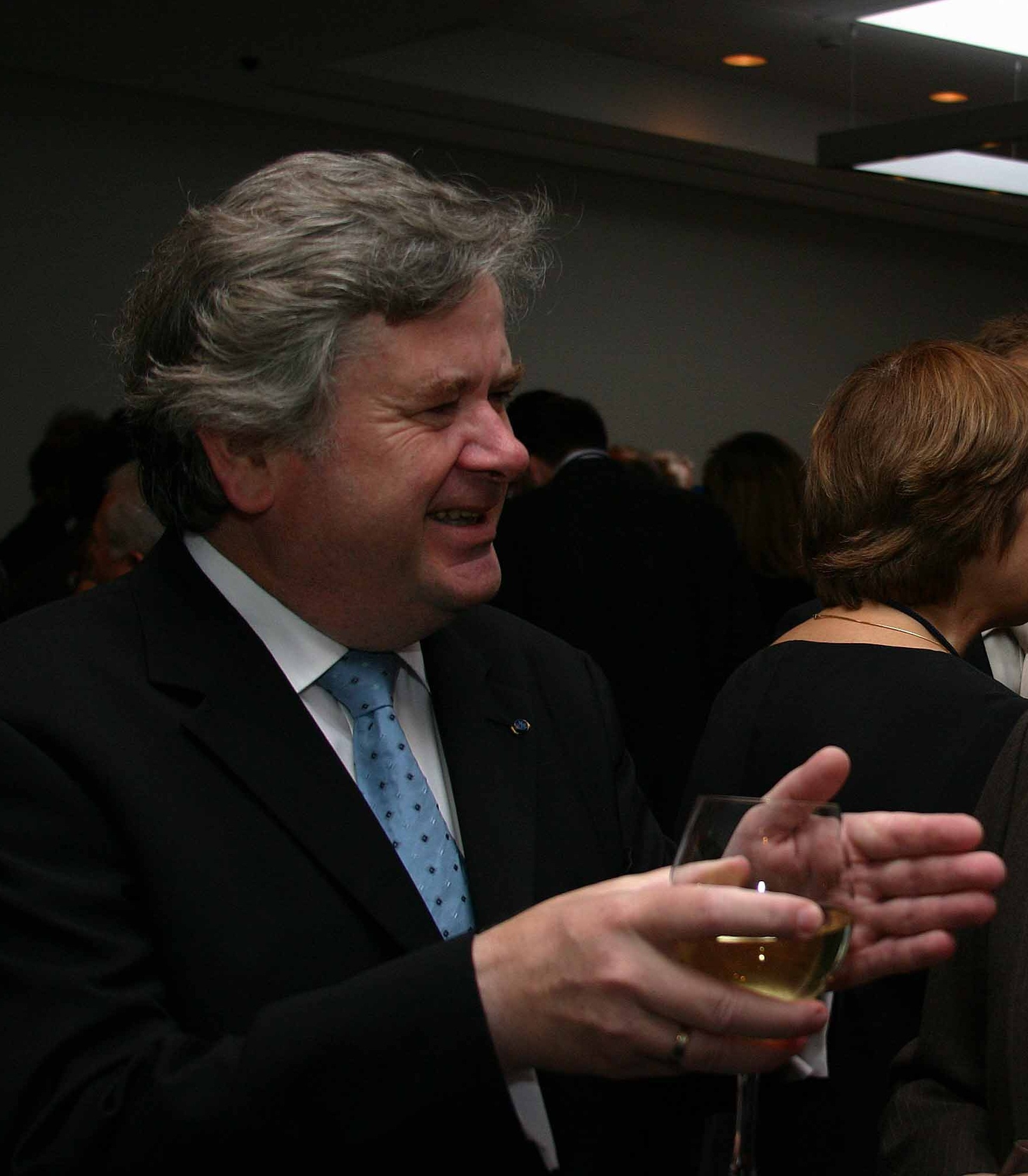
- Davíð Oddsson
- Date formed: 30 April 1991
- Date dissolved: 23 April 1995

People and organisations
- Head of state: Vigdís Finnbogadóttir
- Head of government: Davíð Oddsson
- Member parties: Independence Party (IP); Social Democratic Party (SDP)

History
- Outgoing election: 1995 election
- Predecessor: Steingrímur Hermannsson III
- Successor: Davíð Oddsson II

The First cabinet of Davíð Oddsson in Iceland, nicknamed “The Viðey government” (Icelandic: Viðeyjarstjórnin), was formed 30 April 1991.

== Cabinets ==
=== Inaugural cabinet: 30 April 1991 – 14 June 1993 ===
Incumbent	Minister	Ministry	Party
Davíð Oddsson	Prime Minister (Forsætisráðherra)	Prime Minister's Office (Forsætisráðuneytið)	IP
Davíð Oddsson	Minister of Statistics Iceland (Ráðherra Hagstofu Íslands)	Statistics Iceland (Hagstofa Íslands)	IP
Eiður Svanberg Guðnason	Minister for the Environment (Umhverfisráðherra)	Ministry for the Environment (Umhverfisráðuneytið)	SDP
Friðrik Klemenz Sophusson	Minister of Finance (Fjármálaráðherra)	Ministry of Finance (Fjármálaráðuneytið)	IP
Halldór Blöndal	Minister of Agriculture (Landbúnaðarráðherra)	Ministry of Agriculture (Landbúnaðarráðuneytið)	IP
Halldór Blöndal	Minister of Communications (Samgönguráðherra)	Ministry of Communications (Samgönguráðuneytið)	IP
Jóhanna Sigurðardóttir	Minister of Social Affairs (Félagsmálaráðherra)	Ministry of Social Affairs (Félagsmálaráðuneytið)	SDP
Jón Baldvin Hannibalsson	Minister for Foreign Affairs (Utanríkisráðherra)	Ministry for Foreign Affairs (Utanríkisráðuneytið)	SDP
Jón Sigurðsson	Minister of Commerce (Viðskiptaráðherra)	Ministry of Commerce (Viðskiptaráðuneytið)	SDP
Jón Sigurðsson	Minister of Industry (Iðnaðarráðherra)	Ministry of Industry (Iðnaðarráðuneytið)	SDP
Ólafur Garðar Einarsson	Minister of Education, Science and Culture (Menntamálaráðherra)	Ministry of Education, Science and Culture (Menntamálaráðuneytið)	IP
Sighvatur Kristinn Björgvinsson	Minister of Health and Social Security (Heilbrigðis- og tryggingamálaráðherra)	Ministry of Health and Social Security (Heilbrigðis- og tryggingamálaráðuneytið)	SDP
Þorsteinn Pálsson	Minister of Fisheries (Sjávarútvegsráðherra)	Ministry of Fisheries (Sjávarútvegsráðuneytið)	IP
Þorsteinn Pálsson	Minister of Justice and Ecclesiastical Affairs (Dóms- og kirkjumálaráðherra)	Ministry of Justice and Ecclesiastical Affairs (Dóms- og kirkjumálaráðuneytið)	IP

=== First reshuffle: 14 June 1993 – 24 June 1994 ===
Guðmundur Árni Stefánsson replaced Sighvatur Kristinn Björgvinsson as Minister of Health and Social Security. Össur Skarphéðinsson replaced Eiður Svanberg Guðnason as Minister for the Environment. Sighvatur Kristinn Björgvinsson replaced Jón Sigurðsson as Minister of Commerce and Minister of Industry.

Incumbent	Minister	Ministry	Party
Davíð Oddsson	Prime Minister (Forsætisráðherra)	Prime Minister's Office (Forsætisráðuneytið)	IP
Davíð Oddsson	Minister of Statistics Iceland (Ráðherra Hagstofu Íslands)	Statistics Iceland (Hagstofa Íslands)	IP
Friðrik Klemenz Sophusson	Minister of Finance (Fjármálaráðherra)	Ministry of Finance (Fjármálaráðuneytið)	IP
Guðmundur Árni Stefánsson	Minister of Health and Social Security (Heilbrigðis- og tryggingamálaráðherra)	Ministry of Health and Social Security (Heilbrigðis- og tryggingamálaráðuneytið)	SDP
Halldór Blöndal	Minister of Agriculture (Landbúnaðarráðherra)	Ministry of Agriculture (Landbúnaðarráðuneytið)	IP
Halldór Blöndal	Minister of Communications (Samgönguráðherra)	Ministry of Communications (Samgönguráðuneytið)	IP
Jóhanna Sigurðardóttir	Minister of Social Affairs (Félagsmálaráðherra)	Ministry of Social Affairs (Félagsmálaráðuneytið)	SDP
Jón Baldvin Hannibalsson	Minister for Foreign Affairs (Utanríkisráðherra)	Ministry for Foreign Affairs (Utanríkisráðuneytið)	SDP
Ólafur Garðar Einarsson	Minister of Education, Science and Culture (Menntamálaráðherra)	Ministry of Education, Science and Culture (Menntamálaráðuneytið)	IP
Össur Skarphéðinsson	Minister for the Environment (Umhverfisráðherra)	Ministry for the Environment (Umhverfisráðuneytið)	SDP
Sighvatur Kristinn Björgvinsson	Minister of Commerce (Viðskiptaráðherra)	Ministry of Commerce (Viðskiptaráðuneytið)	SDP
Sighvatur Kristinn Björgvinsson	Minister of Industry (Iðnaðarráðherra)	Ministry of Industry (Iðnaðarráðuneytið)	SDP
Þorsteinn Pálsson	Minister of Fisheries (Sjávarútvegsráðherra)	Ministry of Fisheries (Sjávarútvegsráðuneytið)	IP
Þorsteinn Pálsson	Minister of Justice and Ecclesiastical Affairs (Dóms- og kirkjumálaráðherra)	Ministry of Justice and Ecclesiastical Affairs (Dóms- og kirkjumálaráðuneytið)	IP

=== Second reshuffle: 24 June 1994 – 12 November 1994 ===
Guðmundur Árni Stefánsson replaced Jóhanna Sigurðardóttir as Minister of Social Affairs. Sighvatur Kristinn Björgvinsson replaced Guðmundur Árni Stefánsson as Minister of Health and Social Security.

Incumbent	Minister	Ministry	Party
Davíð Oddsson	Prime Minister (Forsætisráðherra)	Prime Minister's Office (Forsætisráðuneytið)	IP
Davíð Oddsson	Minister of Statistics Iceland (Ráðherra Hagstofu Íslands)	Statistics Iceland (Hagstofa Íslands)	IP
Friðrik Klemenz Sophusson	Minister of Finance (Fjármálaráðherra)	Ministry of Finance (Fjármálaráðuneytið)	IP
Guðmundur Árni Stefánsson	Minister of Social Affairs (Félagsmálaráðherra)	Ministry of Social Affairs (Félagsmálaráðuneytið)	SDP
Halldór Blöndal	Minister of Agriculture (Landbúnaðarráðherra)	Ministry of Agriculture (Landbúnaðarráðuneytið)	IP
Halldór Blöndal	Minister of Communications (Samgönguráðherra)	Ministry of Communications (Samgönguráðuneytið)	IP
Jón Baldvin Hannibalsson	Minister for Foreign Affairs (Utanríkisráðherra)	Ministry for Foreign Affairs (Utanríkisráðuneytið)	SDP
Ólafur Garðar Einarsson	Minister of Education, Science and Culture (Menntamálaráðherra)	Ministry of Education, Science and Culture (Menntamálaráðuneytið)	IP
Össur Skarphéðinsson	Minister for the Environment (Umhverfisráðherra)	Ministry for the Environment (Umhverfisráðuneytið)	SDP
Sighvatur Kristinn Björgvinsson	Minister of Commerce (Viðskiptaráðherra)	Ministry of Commerce (Viðskiptaráðuneytið)	SDP
Sighvatur Kristinn Björgvinsson	Minister of Health and Social Security (Heilbrigðis- og tryggingamálaráðherra)	Ministry of Health and Social Security (Heilbrigðis- og tryggingamálaráðuneytið)	SDP
Sighvatur Kristinn Björgvinsson	Minister of Industry (Iðnaðarráðherra)	Ministry of Industry (Iðnaðarráðuneytið)	SDP
Þorsteinn Pálsson	Minister of Fisheries (Sjávarútvegsráðherra)	Ministry of Fisheries (Sjávarútvegsráðuneytið)	IP
Þorsteinn Pálsson	Minister of Justice and Ecclesiastical Affairs (Dóms- og kirkjumálaráðherra)	Ministry of Justice and Ecclesiastical Affairs (Dóms- og kirkjumálaráðuneytið)	IP

=== Third reshuffle: 12 November 1994 – 23 April 1995 ===
Rannveig Guðmundsdóttir replaced Guðmundur Árni Stefánsson as Minister of Social Affairs.

Incumbent	Minister	Ministry	Party
Davíð Oddsson	Prime Minister (Forsætisráðherra)	Prime Minister's Office (Forsætisráðuneytið)	IP
Davíð Oddsson	Minister of Statistics Iceland (Ráðherra Hagstofu Íslands)	Statistics Iceland (Hagstofa Íslands)	IP
Friðrik Klemenz Sophusson	Minister of Finance (Fjármálaráðherra)	Ministry of Finance (Fjármálaráðuneytið)	IP
Halldór Blöndal	Minister of Agriculture (Landbúnaðarráðherra)	Ministry of Agriculture (Landbúnaðarráðuneytið)	IP
Halldór Blöndal	Minister of Communications (Samgönguráðherra)	Ministry of Communications (Samgönguráðuneytið)	IP
Jón Baldvin Hannibalsson	Minister for Foreign Affairs (Utanríkisráðherra)	Ministry for Foreign Affairs (Utanríkisráðuneytið)	SDP
Ólafur Garðar Einarsson	Minister of Education, Science and Culture (Menntamálaráðherra)	Ministry of Education, Science and Culture (Menntamálaráðuneytið)	IP
Össur Skarphéðinsson	Minister for the Environment (Umhverfisráðherra)	Ministry for the Environment (Umhverfisráðuneytið)	SDP
Rannveig Guðmundsdóttir	Minister of Social Affairs (Félagsmálaráðherra)	Ministry of Social Affairs (Félagsmálaráðuneytið)	SDP
Sighvatur Kristinn Björgvinsson	Minister of Commerce (Viðskiptaráðherra)	Ministry of Commerce (Viðskiptaráðuneytið)	SDP
Sighvatur Kristinn Björgvinsson	Minister of Health and Social Security (Heilbrigðis- og tryggingamálaráðherra)	Ministry of Health and Social Security (Heilbrigðis- og tryggingamálaráðuneytið)	SDP
Sighvatur Kristinn Björgvinsson	Minister of Industry (Iðnaðarráðherra)	Ministry of Industry (Iðnaðarráðuneytið)	SDP
Þorsteinn Pálsson	Minister of Fisheries (Sjávarútvegsráðherra)	Ministry of Fisheries (Sjávarútvegsráðuneytið)	IP
Þorsteinn Pálsson	Minister of Justice and Ecclesiastical Affairs (Dóms- og kirkjumálaráðherra)	Ministry of Justice and Ecclesiastical Affairs (Dóms- og kirkjumálaráðuneytið)	IP

== See also ==
- Government of Iceland
- Cabinet of Iceland
