= Iceland Square =

Street in Tallinn, Estonia

Coordinates: 59°25′59″N 24°45′12″E

Iceland Square (Estonian: Islandi väljak) is a square located in the center of Tallinn, Estonia, bordering Rävala Boulevard and the driving and parking strip on the southeast side of it between the square and the Ministry of Foreign Affairs building. The name of the square is dedicated to Iceland, which was the first country to recognize the restored Republic of Estonia.

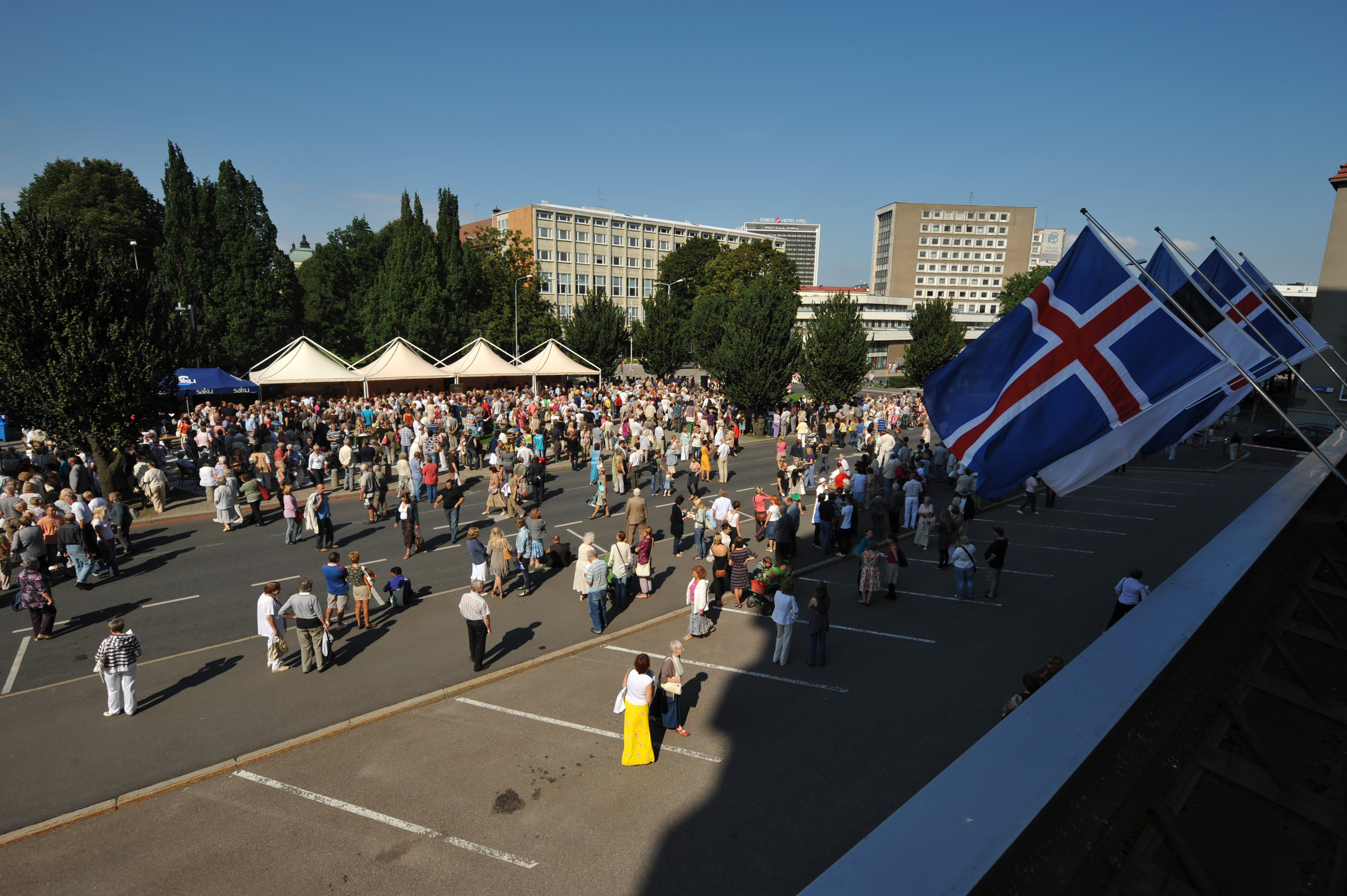
Iceland Day on Iceland Square, 2011

== History ==
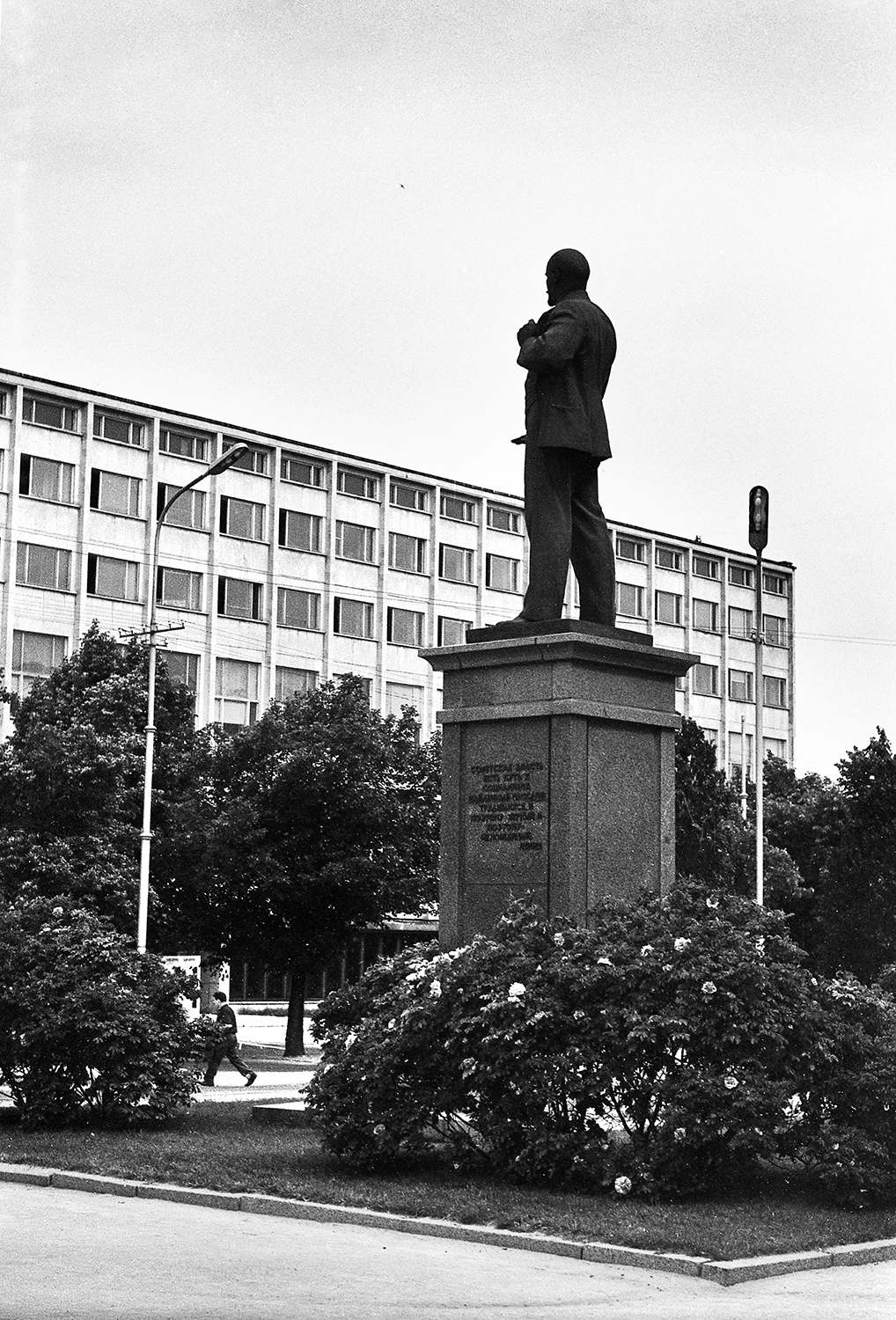
Statue of Lenin on the square in 1972

The square, which at first had no name, was created on the site of the building destroyed in the March 1944 bombing, according to Harald Aarman's "Tallinn Culture Center" project, completed in 1949, at the intersection of the axes of Võidu allee and Estonia esplanaad.

In 1950, a statue of Lenin designed by sculptor Nikolai Tomsky was opened on the square, with a granite pedestal designed by Alar Kotli. The monument was removed in 1991.

The landscaped square on Rävala puiestee got its name by Tallinn City Government Regulation No. 51 of August 21, 1998. The name is given in honor of Iceland, which became the first nation to recognize the restored independent Estonia in August 22, 1991.

On August 11, 1999, the Ministry of Foreign Affairs requested to change its current address, Rävala puiestee 9, to Islandi väljak 1 (Iceland Square 1). On August 31, 1999, the Tallinn City Planning Board changed the address of the Ministry of Foreign Affairs in the requested manner. As this decision turned out to be legally incorrect, on October 19, 1999, the Tallinn City Planning Board asked the Ministry of Foreign Affairs to stop the use of the new address and related actions until a legally correct solution is found. In response, the Chancellor of the Ministry of Foreign Affairs, Indrek Tarand, announced on October 25 that forms, seals, business cards, etc. for documents with a new address have already been ordered and a note has been sent to all foreign embassies informing them that the Ministry of Foreign Affairs has a new address. Also, during the state visit to Iceland in October 1999, President Lennart Meri had informed the Icelandic government about the change of the address of the Estonian Ministry of Foreign Affairs and its hinterlands. Therefore, not changing the address for foreign policy reasons was out of the question.

The Tallinn City Government proposed a solution that Iceland Square would be expanded to the existing part of Rävala Boulevard in front of the Ministry of Foreign Affairs. On November 10, 1999, the Place Names Council agreed to this as an exceptional solution, emphasizing that "the politicization of place names and exaggeration with devotional names do not belong to the historical name tradition of the Nordic countries, nor Estonia".

On May 10, 2000, the Tallinn City Government implemented this plan with Regulation No. 31, which entered into force on May 15, 2000.

On August 22, 2006, the Prime Minister of Iceland, Geir H. Haarde, opened a commemorative plaque on the wall of the Ministry of Foreign Affairs building, which is dedicated to Iceland's recognition of Estonia's restoration of independence.

On May 11, 2022, nearly 22 years after the Iceland Square name came to exist in the final decision, Reykjavik, the capital city of Iceland, announced its intent to name 3 streets after the three Baltic countries respectively, including Estonia.

== Iceland Day 2011 ==
Iceland Day was an event held on August 21, 2011 in Tallinn, celebrating the 20th anniversary of the re-recognition of Estonia by Iceland. Iceland's President Ólafur Ragnar Grímsson and Foreign Minister Össur Skarphéðinsson also visited Estonia during the event.
