= Second cabinet of Geir Haarde =

Government of Iceland from May 2007 to February 2009

- 39th Cabinet of Iceland

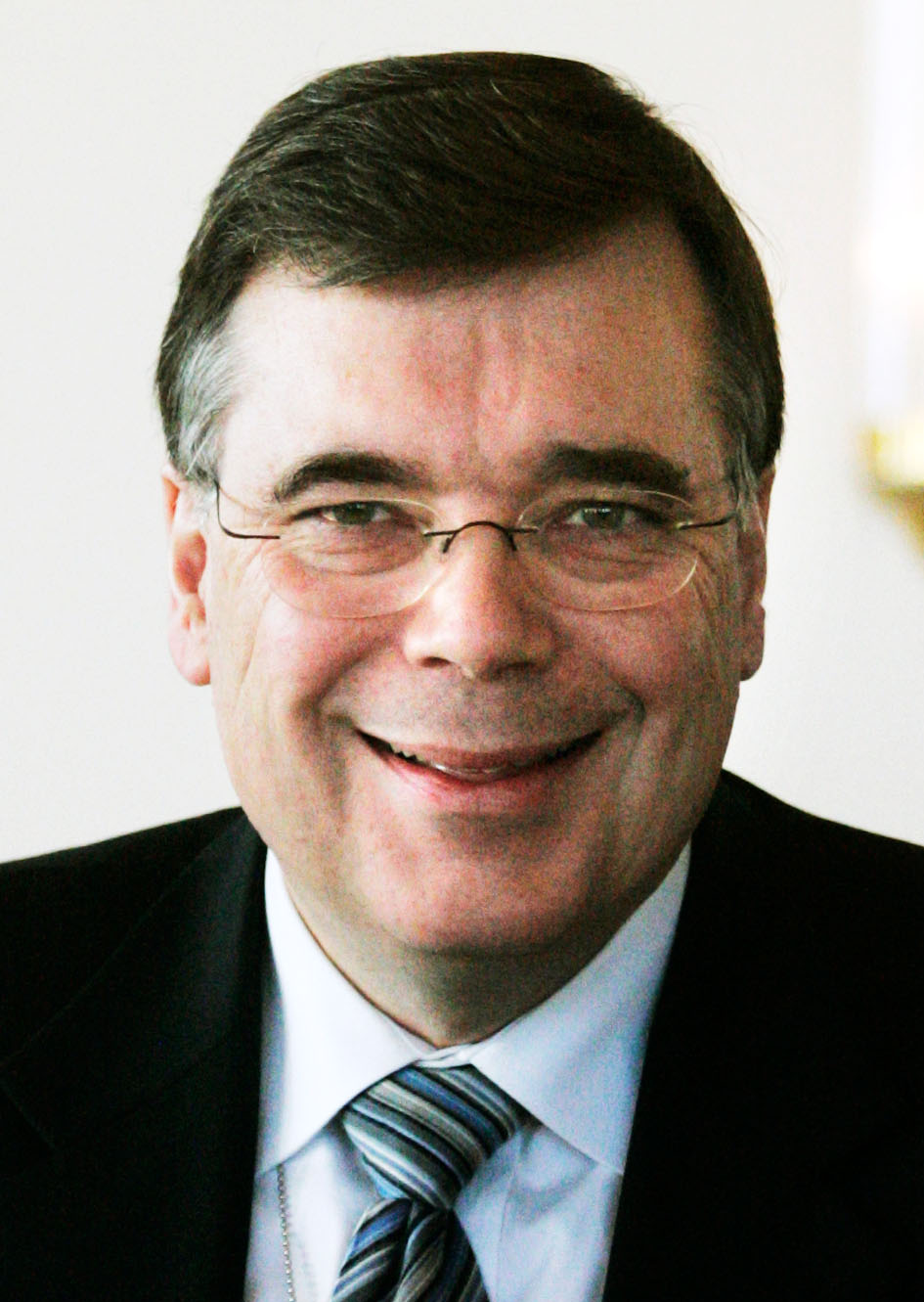
- Geir Haarde
- Date formed: 24 May 2007
- Date dissolved: 1 February 2009

People and organisations
- President: Ólafur Ragnar Grímsson
- Prime Minister: Geir Haarde
- No. of ministers: 12
- Member parties: Independence Party (D); Social Democratic Alliance (S)
- Status in legislature: Majority government (coalition)
- Opposition parties: Left-Green Movement (V); Progressive Party (B); Liberal Party

History
- Predecessor: Geir Haarde I
- Successor: Jóhanna Sigurðardóttir I

The Second cabinet of Geir Haarde in Iceland, nicknamed “The government of collapse” (Icelandic: Hrunstjórnin), was formed 24 May 2007. It resigned due to the 2009 Icelandic financial crisis protests.

== Cabinet ==
=== Inaugural cabinet: 24 May 2007 – 1 February 2009 ===
The Ministry of Commerce was renamed in English the Ministry of Business Affairs but the Icelandic name was unchanged. The Ministry of Industry was renamed in English the Ministry of Industry, Energy and Tourism but the Icelandic name was unchanged.

Incumbent	Minister	Ministry	Party
Geir Haarde	Prime Minister (Forsætisráðherra)	Prime Minister's Office (Forsætisráðuneytið)	D
Geir Haarde	Minister of Statistics Iceland (Ráðherra Hagstofu Íslands)	Statistics Iceland (Hagstofa Íslands)	D
Árni Mathiesen	Minister of Finance (Fjármálaráðherra)	Ministry of Finance (Fjármálaráðuneytið)	D
Björgvin G. Sigurðsson	Minister of Commerce (Viðskiptaráðherra)	Ministry of Commerce (Viðskiptaráðuneytið)	S
Björn Bjarnason	Minister of Justice and Ecclesiastical Affairs (Dóms- og kirkjumálaráðherra)	Ministry of Justice and Ecclesiastical Affairs (Dóms- og kirkjumálaráðuneytið)	D
Einar Kristinn Guðfinnsson	Minister of Agriculture (Landbúnaðarráðherra)	Ministry of Agriculture (Landbúnaðarráðuneytið)	D
Einar Kristinn Guðfinnsson	Minister of Fisheries (Sjávarútvegsráðherra)	Ministry of Fisheries (Sjávarútvegsráðuneytið)	D
Guðlaugur Þór Þórðarson	Minister of Health and Social Security (Heilbrigðis- og tryggingamálaráðherra)	Ministry of Health and Social Security (Heilbrigðis- og tryggingamálaráðuneytið)	D
Ingibjörg Sólrún Gísladóttir	Minister for Foreign Affairs (Utanríkisráðherra)	Ministry for Foreign Affairs (Utanríkisráðuneytið)	S
Jóhanna Sigurðardóttir	Minister of Social Affairs (Félagsmálaráðherra)	Ministry of Social Affairs (Félagsmálaráðuneytið)	S
Kristján L. Möller	Minister of Communications (Samgönguráðherra)	Ministry of Communications (Samgönguráðuneytið)	S
Össur Skarphéðinsson	Minister of Industry (Iðnaðarráðherra)	Ministry of Industry (Iðnaðarráðuneytið)	S
Þorgerður Katrín Gunnarsdóttir	Minister of Education, Science and Culture (Menntamálaráðherra)	Ministry of Education, Science and Culture (Menntamálaráðuneytið)	D
Þórunn Sveinbjarnardóttir	Minister for the Environment (Umhverfisráðherra)	Ministry for the Environment (Umhverfisráðuneytið)	S

==== Change: 1 January 2008 ====
The Ministry of Agriculture and the Ministry of Fisheries merged to form the Ministry of Fisheries and Agriculture (Sjávarútvegs- og landbúnaðarráðuneytið). The Ministry of Health and Social Security was renamed the Ministry of Health (Heilbrigðisráðuneytið). The Ministry of Social Affairs was renamed the Ministry of Social Affairs and Social Security (Félags- og tryggingamálaráðuneytið). Statistics Iceland became an independent government agency.

== See also ==
- Government of Iceland
- Cabinet of Iceland
