= Eiður =

- Pronunciation: [ˈeiːðʏr̥]
- Gender: Male

Origin
- Language: Old Norse
- Origin: Eiðr
- Meaning: Sworn promise

Eiður is an Icelandic given name. It appears in Landnámabók and its meaning is most likely 'oath' in English (ed or eid in some modern Germanic languages). The name is rather uncommon, carried only by around 200 persons.

== People with the name Eiður ==
- Eiður Guðjohnsen, footballer
- Eiður Svanberg Guðnason, politician
