= Third cabinet of Steingrímur Hermannsson =

Government of Iceland from 1989 to 1991

- 32nd Cabinet of Iceland
- Date formed: 10 September 1989
- Date dissolved: 30 April 1991

People and organisations
- Head of state: Vigdís Finnbogadóttir
- Head of government: Steingrímur Hermannsson
- Member parties: Progressive Party (PP); Social Democratic Party (SDP); People's Alliance (PA); Citizens' Party (CP)

History
- Outgoing election: 1991 election
- Predecessor: Steingrímur Hermannsson II
- Successor: Davíð Oddsson I

The Third cabinet of Steingrímur Hermannsson in Iceland, nicknamed “The fifth left government” (Icelandic: Vinstristjórn V), was formed 10 September 1989.

== Cabinet ==
=== Inaugural cabinet: 10 September 1989 – 30 April 1991 ===
Incumbent	Minister	Ministry	Party
Steingrímur Hermannsson	Prime Minister (Forsætisráðherra)	Prime Minister's Office (Forsætisráðuneytið)	PP
Edvard Júlíus Sólnes	Minister of Statistics Iceland (Ráðherra Hagstofu Íslands)	Statistics Iceland (Hagstofa Íslands)	CP
Guðmundur Kristján Bjarnason	Minister of Health and Social Security (Heilbrigðis- og tryggingamálaráðherra)	Ministry of Health and Social Security (Heilbrigðis- og tryggingamálaráðuneytið)	PP
Halldór Ásgrímsson	Minister of Fisheries (Sjávarútvegsráðherra)	Ministry of Fisheries (Sjávarútvegsráðuneytið)	PP
Jóhanna Sigurðardóttir	Minister of Social Affairs (Félagsmálaráðherra)	Ministry of Social Affairs (Félagsmálaráðuneytið)	SDP
Jón Baldvin Hannibalsson	Minister for Foreign Affairs (Utanríkisráðherra)	Ministry for Foreign Affairs (Utanríkisráðuneytið)	SDP
Jón Sigurðsson	Minister of Commerce (Viðskiptaráðherra)	Ministry of Commerce (Viðskiptaráðuneytið)	SDP
Jón Sigurðsson	Minister of Industry (Iðnaðarráðherra)	Ministry of Industry (Iðnaðarráðuneytið)	SDP
Ólafur Ragnar Grímsson	Minister of Finance (Fjármálaráðherra)	Ministry of Finance (Fjármálaráðuneytið)	PA
Óli Þorbjörn Guðbjartsson	Minister of Justice and Ecclesiastical Affairs (Dóms- og kirkjumálaráðherra)	Ministry of Justice and Ecclesiastical Affairs (Dóms- og kirkjumálaráðuneytið)	CP
Steingrímur J. Sigfússon	Minister of Agriculture (Landbúnaðarráðherra)	Ministry of Agriculture (Landbúnaðarráðuneytið)	PA
Steingrímur J. Sigfússon	Minister of Communications (Samgönguráðherra)	Ministry of Communications (Samgönguráðuneytið)	PA
Svavar Gestsson	Minister of Education, Science and Culture (Menntamálaráðherra)	Ministry of Education, Science and Culture (Menntamálaráðuneytið)	PA

==== Change: 23 February 1990 ====
The Ministry for the Environment (Umhverfisráðuneytið) was founded and led by Edvard Júlíus Sólnes. Steingrímur Hermannsson replaced Edvard Júlíus Sólnes as Minister of Statistics Iceland.

== See also ==
- Government of Iceland
- Cabinet of Iceland
