= Cabinet of Jóhanna Sigurðardóttir =

Cabinet of Jóhanna Sigurðardóttir may refer to:

- First cabinet of Jóhanna Sigurðardóttir
- Second cabinet of Jóhanna Sigurðardóttir
