= First cabinet of Jóhanna Sigurðardóttir =

Government of Iceland from February to May 2009

- 40th Cabinet of Iceland

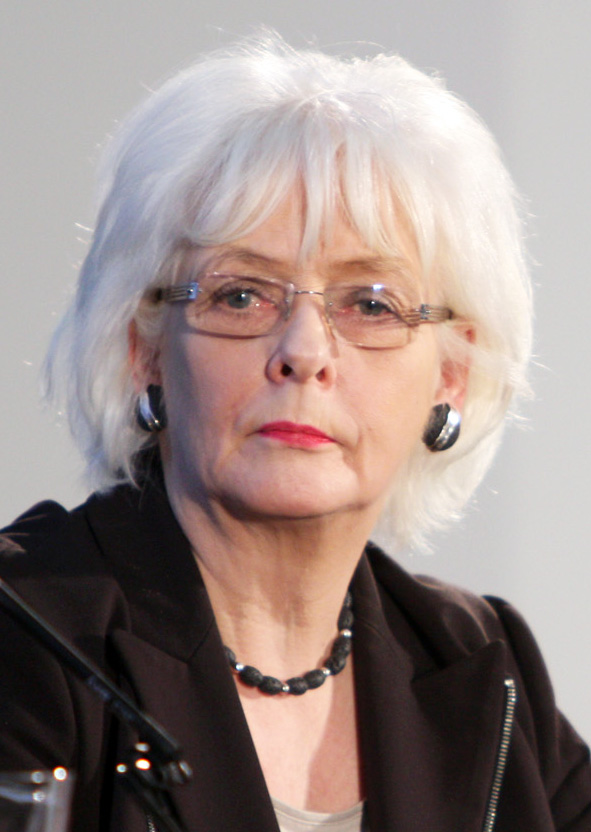
- Jóhanna Sigurðardóttir
- Date formed: 1 February 2009
- Date dissolved: 10 May 2009

People and organisations
- President: Ólafur Ragnar Grímsson
- Prime Minister: Jóhanna Sigurðardóttir
- No. of ministers: 10
- Member parties: Social Democratic Alliance (S); Left-Green Movement (V); Independents
- Status in legislature: Minority government (coalition)
- Opposition parties: Independence Party (D); Progressive Party (B); Citizens' Movement (O)

History
- Outgoing election: 2009 election
- Predecessor: Geir Haarde II
- Successor: Jóhanna Sigurðardóttir II

The First cabinet of Jóhanna Sigurðardóttir in Iceland, nicknamed “The welfare government” (Icelandic: Velferðarstjórnin) or “The sixth left government” (Icelandic: Vinstristjórn VI), was formed 1 February 2009 after the Second cabinet of Geir Haarde resigned due to the 2009 Icelandic financial crisis protests.

== Cabinet ==
=== Inaugural cabinet: 1 February 2009 – 10 May 2009 ===
Incumbent	Minister	Ministry	Party
Jóhanna Sigurðardóttir	Prime Minister (Forsætisráðherra)	Prime Minister's Office (Forsætisráðuneytið)	S
Ásta Ragnheiður Jóhannesdóttir	Minister of Social Affairs and Social Security (Félags- og tryggingamálaráðherra)	Ministry of Social Affairs and Social Security (Félags- og tryggingamálaráðuneytið)	S
Gylfi Magnússon	Minister of Trade (Viðskiptaráðherra)	Ministry of Trade (Viðskiptaráðuneytið)	Independent
Katrín Jakobsdóttir	Minister of Education, Science and Culture (Menntamálaráðherra)	Ministry of Education, Science and Culture (Menntamálaráðuneytið)	V
Kolbrún Halldórsdóttir	Minister for the Environment (Umhverfisráðherra)	Ministry for the Environment (Umhverfisráðuneytið)	V
Kristján L. Möller	Minister of Communications (Samgönguráðherra)	Ministry of Communications (Samgönguráðuneytið)	S
Ögmundur Jónasson	Minister of Health (Heilbrigðisráðherra)	Ministry of Health (Heilbrigðisráðuneytið)	V
Össur Skarphéðinsson	Minister for Foreign Affairs (Utanríkisráðherra)	Ministry for Foreign Affairs (Utanríkisráðuneytið)	S
Össur Skarphéðinsson	Minister of Industry, Energy and Tourism (Iðnaðarráðherra)	Ministry of Industry, Energy and Tourism (Iðnaðarráðuneytið)	S
Steingrímur J. Sigfússon	Minister of Finance (Fjármálaráðherra)	Ministry of Finance (Fjármálaráðuneytið)	V
Steingrímur J. Sigfússon	Minister of Fisheries and Agriculture (Sjávarútvegs- og landbúnaðarráðherra)	Ministry of Fisheries and Agriculture (Sjávarútvegs- og landbúnaðarráðuneytið)	V
Ragna Árnadóttir	Minister of Justice and Ecclesiastical Affairs (Dóms- og kirkjumálaráðherra)	Ministry of Justice and Ecclesiastical Affairs (Dóms- og kirkjumálaráðuneytið)	independent

== See also ==
- Government of Iceland
- Cabinet of Iceland
