= Minister for Nordic Cooperation (Finland) =

The Minister for Nordic Cooperation (Finnish: pohjoismaisen yhteistyön ministeri, Swedish: minister för nordiskt samarbete) is one of the Finnish Government's ministerial positions. The minister is often one of the leading positions at the Ministry for Foreign Affairs.

However, in the current Orpo Cabinet, there is no separate minister post for Nordic Cooperation. The portfolio is instead handled by Minister of Education Anna-Maja Henriksson of the Swedish People's Party.

== See also ==
- Minister for Nordic Cooperation (Denmark)
- Minister for Nordic Cooperation (Iceland)
- Minister for Nordic Cooperation (Sweden)
