= Minister for the Environment and Natural Resources (Iceland) =

Icelandic cabinet position

The Minister for the Environment and Natural Resources (Icelandic: Umhverfis- og auðlindaráðherra) is the head of the Ministry for the Environment and Natural Resources. The current Minister for the Environment and Natural Resources is Jóhann Páll Jóhannsson.

== List of ministers ==
=== Ministers for the Environment (23 February 1990 – 1 September 2012) ===
Nº	Minister	Took office	Left office	Duration	Party	Cabinet
1	Edvard Júlíus Sólnes (1937–)	23 February 1990	30 April 1991	1 year, 2 months, 7 days (431 days)	CP	Steingrímur Hermannsson III
2	Eiður Svanberg Guðnason (1939–2017)	30 April 1991	14 June 1993	2 years, 1 month, 15 days (776 days)	SDP	Davíð Oddsson I
3	Össur Skarphéðinsson (1953–)	14 June 1993	23 April 1995	1 year, 10 months, 9 days (678 days)	SDP	Davíð Oddsson I
4	Guðmundur Kristján Bjarnason (1944–)	23 April 1995	11 May 1999	4 years, 18 days (1479 days)	PP	Davíð Oddsson II
5	Halldór Ásgrímsson (1947–2015)	11 May 1999	28 May 1999	17 days (17 days)	PP	Davíð Oddsson II
6	Siv Friðleifsdóttir (1962–)	28 May 1999	23 May 2003	5 years, 3 months, 18 days (1937 days)	PP	Davíð Oddsson III
6	Siv Friðleifsdóttir (1962–)	23 May 2003	15 September 2004	5 years, 3 months, 18 days (1937 days)	PP	Davíð Oddsson IV
7	Sigríður Anna Þórðardóttir (1946–)	15 September 2004	15 June 2006	1 year, 9 months (638 days)	IP	Halldór Ásgrímsson
8	Jónína Bjartmarz (1952–)	15 June 2006	24 May 2007	11 months, 9 days (343 days)	PP	Geir Haarde I
9	Þórunn Sveinbjarnardóttir (1965–)	24 May 2007	1 February 2009	1 year, 8 months, 8 days (619 days)	SDA	Geir Haarde II
10	Kolbrún Halldórsdóttir (1955–)	1 February 2009	10 May 2009	3 months, 9 days (98 days)	LGM	Jóhanna Sigurðardóttir I
11	Svandís Svavarsdóttir (1964–)	10 May 2009	—	—	LGM	Jóhanna Sigurðardóttir II

=== Ministers for the Environment and Natural Resources (1 September 2012 – 28 November 2021) ===
Nº	Minister	Took office	Left office	Duration	Party	Cabinet
(11)	Svandís Svavarsdóttir (1964–)	—	23 May 2013	4 years, 13 days (1,474 days)	LGM	Jóhanna Sigurðardóttir II
12	Sigurður Ingi Jóhannsson (1962–)	23 May 2013	31 December 2014	1 year, 7 months, 8 days (587 days)	PP	Sigmundur Davíð Gunnlaugsson
13	Sigrún Magnúsdóttir (1944–)	31 December 2014	11 January 2017	2 years, 11 days (742 days)	PP	Sigmundur Davíð Gunnlaugsson
13	Sigrún Magnúsdóttir (1944–)	31 December 2014	11 January 2017	2 years, 11 days (742 days)	PP	Sigurður Ingi Jóhannsson
14	Björt Ólafsdóttir (1983–)	11 January 2017	30 November 2017	10 months, 19 days (323 days)	BF	Bjarni Benediktsson
15	Guðmundur Ingi Guðbrandsson (1977–)	30 November 2017	28 November 2021	5 years, 339 days (1,459 days)	LGM	Katrín Jakobsdóttir I

=== Minister for the Environment, Energy and Climate (28 November 2021 – present) ===
Nº	Minister	Took office	Left office	Duration	Party	Cabinet
16	Guðlaugur Þór Þórðarson (1967–)	28 November 2021	21 December 2024	3 years, 23 days (1119 days)	IP	Katrín Jakobsdóttir II
16	Guðlaugur Þór Þórðarson (1967–)	28 November 2021	21 December 2024	3 years, 23 days (1119 days)	IP	Bjarni Benediktsson II
17	Jóhann Páll Jóhannsson (1992–)	21 December 2024	Incumbent	119 days (119 days)	SDA	Kristrún Frostadóttir
