= Svandís Svavarsdóttir =

Icelandic politician (born 1964)

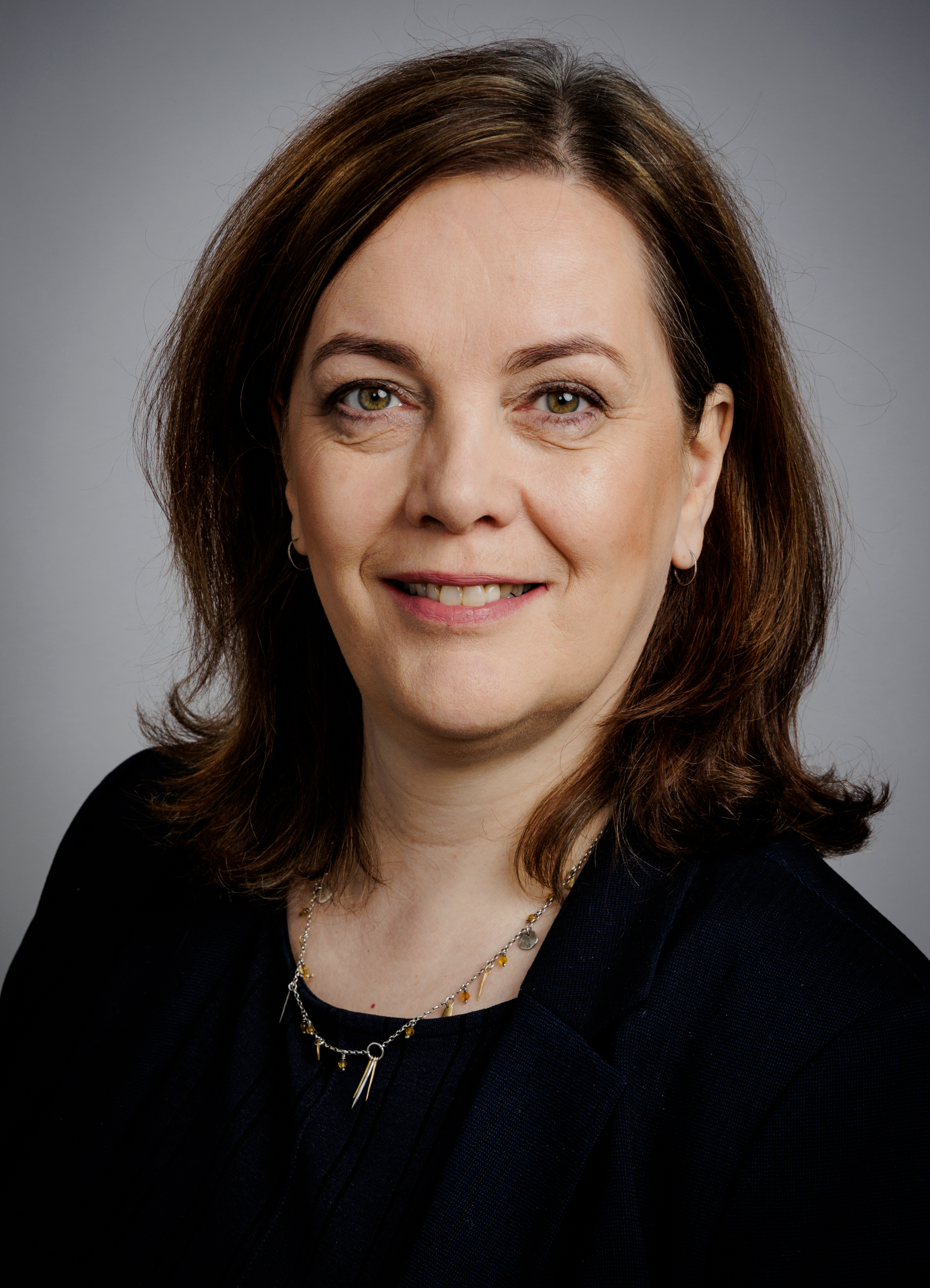
- Svandís in 2021

Minister of Infrastructure
- In office 9 April 2024 – 17 October 2024
- Prime Minister: Bjarni Benediktsson
- Preceded by: Sigurður Ingi Jóhannsson
- Succeeded by: Sigurður Ingi Jóhannsson

Minister of Fisheries and Agriculture
- In office 28 November 2021 – 9 April 2024
- Prime Minister: Katrín Jakobsdóttir
- Preceded by: Kristján Þór Júlíusson
- Succeeded by: Bjarkey Gunnarsdóttir

Minister of Health
- In office 30 November 2017 – 28 November 2021
- Prime Minister: Katrín Jakobsdóttir
- Preceded by: Óttarr Proppé
- Succeeded by: Willum Þór Þórsson

Minister for the Environment
- In office 10 May 2009 – 23 May 2013
- Prime Minister: Jóhanna Sigurðardóttir
- Preceded by: Kolbrún Halldórsdóttir
- Succeeded by: Sigurður Ingi Jóhannsson

Chair of the Left-Green Movement
- Incumbent
- Assumed office 6 October 2024
- Preceded by: Guðmundur Ingi Guðbrandsson

Personal details
- Born: 24 August 1964 (age 62) Selfoss, Iceland
- Party: Left-Green Movement

Svandís Svavarsdóttir (born 24 August 1964) is an Icelandic politician who has been member of the Althing since 2009. In October 2024, she was elected party leader of the Left-Green Movement. She served as Minister for the Environment and Natural Resources in the government of Jóhanna Sigurðardóttir. In the First cabinet of Katrín Jakobsdóttir she served as Minister of Health. She was also the leader of the Left-Green Movement's parliamentary group. She served as the Minister of Fisheries and Agriculture in the Second cabinet of Katrín Jakobsdóttir before Bjarni Benediktsson became Prime Minister, and she became Minister of Infrastructure.

Party political offices
Preceded by Guðmundur Ingi Guðbrandsson	Chair of the Left-Green Movement; 2024–present	Incumbent
Political offices
Preceded by Kolbrún Halldórsdóttir	Minister for the Environment; 2009–2013	Succeeded by Sigurður Ingi Jóhannsson
Preceded by Óttarr Proppé	Minister of Health; 2017–2021	Succeeded by Willum Þór Þórsson
Preceded by Kristján Þór Júlíusson	Minister of Fisheries and Agriculture; 2021–2024	Succeeded by Bjarkey Gunnarsdóttir
Preceded by Sigurður Ingi Jóhannsson	Minister of Infrastructure; 2024	Succeeded by Sigurður Ingi Jóhannsson
