= Edvard Júlíus Sólnes =

Icelandic politician (born 1937)

Edvarð Júlíus Sólnes (born 22 March 1937) is an Icelandic politician and former government minister.

Political offices
Preceded by Sighvatur Kristinn Björgvinsson	Minister of Statistics Iceland; 1989–1991	Succeeded by Davíð Oddsson
Preceded by Jón Sigurðsson	Minister for Nordic Cooperation; 1989–1991	Succeeded by Eiður Svanberg Guðnason
Preceded by -	Minister for the Environment; 1990–1991	Succeeded by Eiður Svanberg Guðnason
