= Jónína Bjartmarz =

Icelandic politician (born 1952)

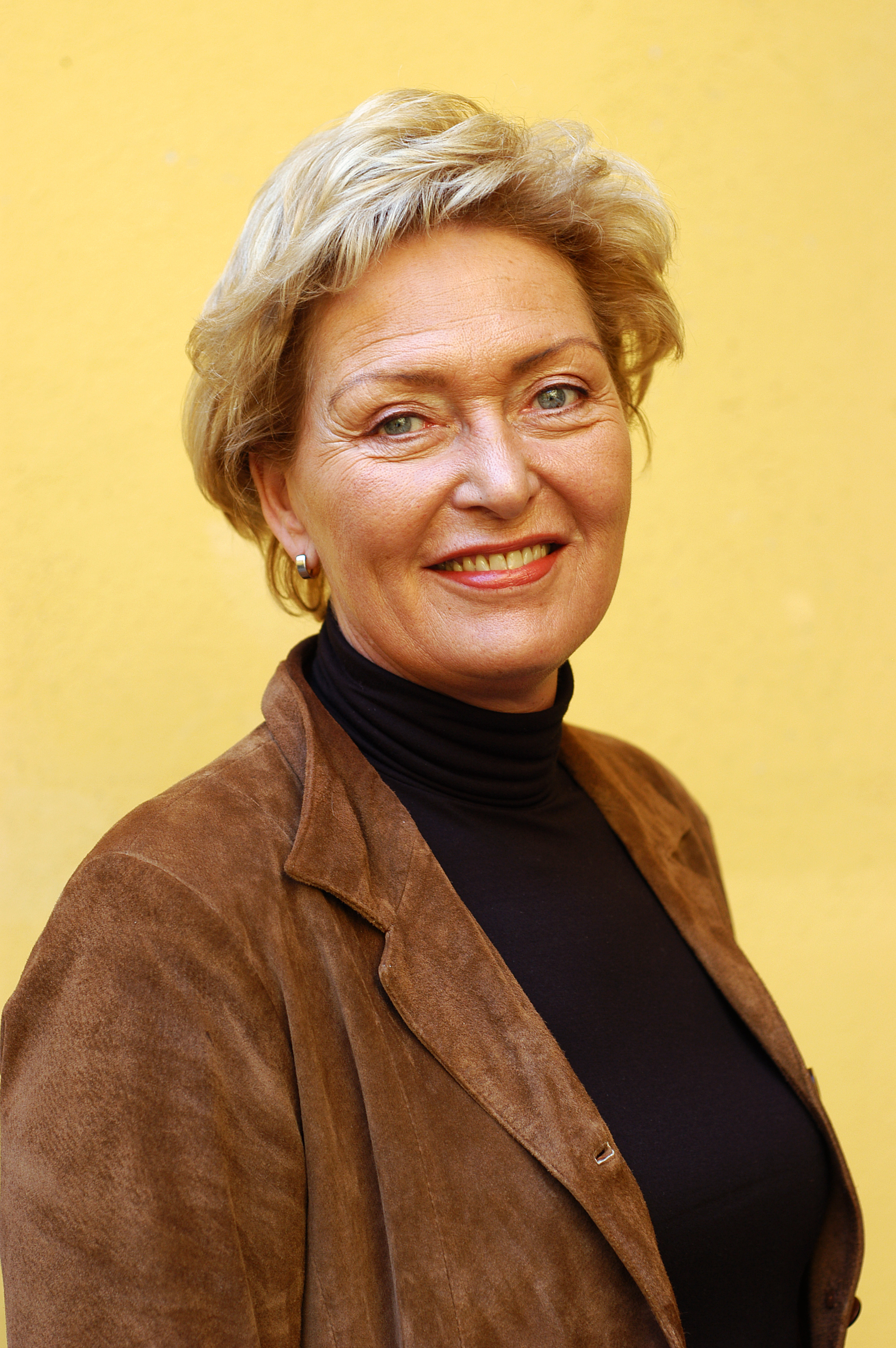

Minister for the Environment and Minister for Nordic Cooperation
- In office 15 June 2006 – 24 May 2007
- Prime Minister: Geir Haarde

Personal details
- Born: 23 December 1952 (age 73) Reykjavík, Iceland

Jónína Bjartmarz (born 23 December 1952 in Reykjavík) is an Icelandic politician and former Minister for the Environment and of Nordic Cooperation.

Political offices
Preceded by Sigríður Anna Þórðardóttir	Minister for Nordic Cooperation; 2006–2007	Succeeded by Össur Skarphéðinsson
Preceded by Sigríður Anna Þórðardóttir	Minister for the Environment; 2006–2007	Succeeded by Þórunn Sveinbjarnardóttir
