= Sigríður Anna Þórðardóttir =

Icelandic politician (born 1946)

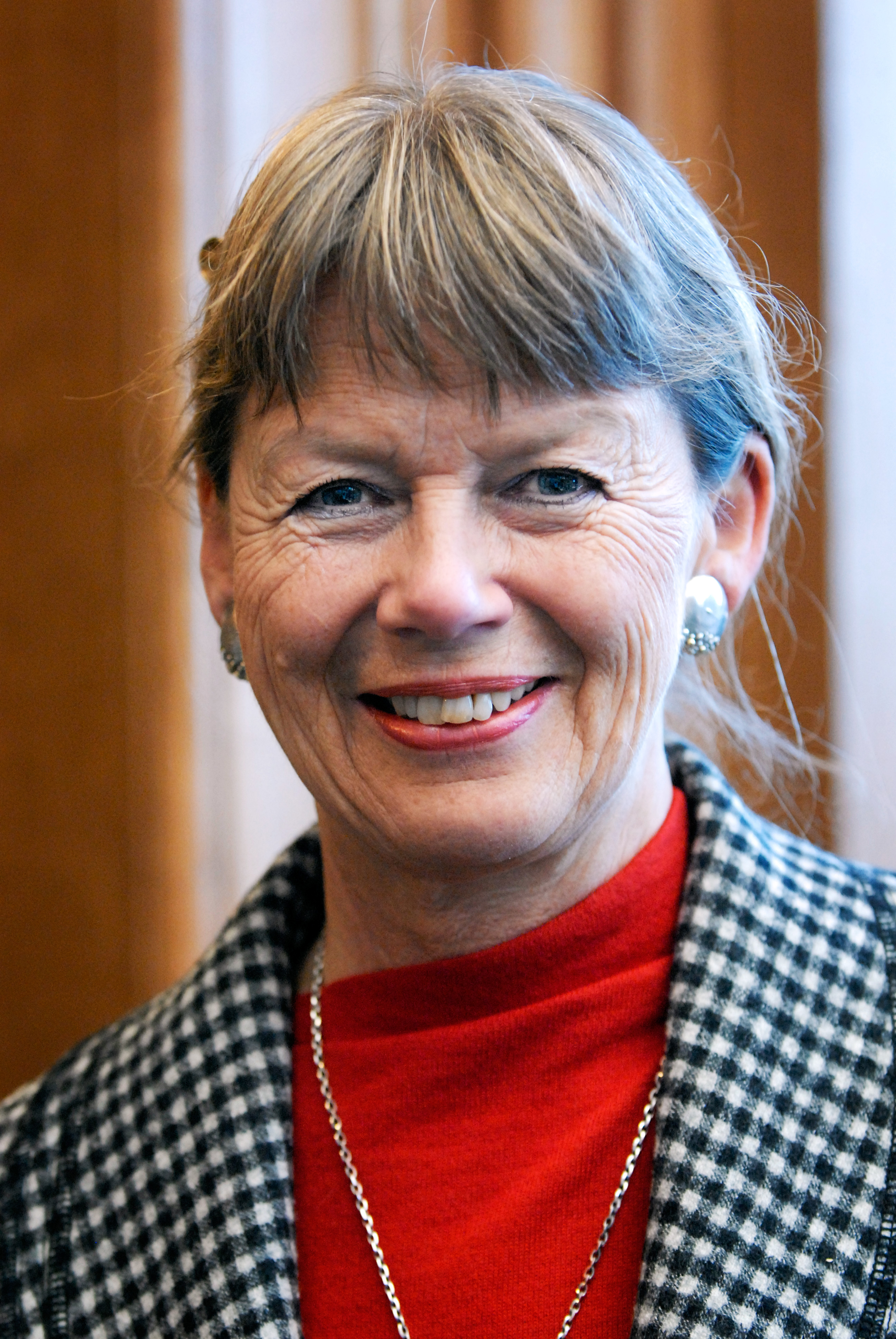

Sigríður Anna Þórðardóttir (born 14 May 1946) is an Icelandic politician and former Minister for the Environment in the cabinet of Halldór Ásgrímsson. She served as minister from 15 September 2004 to 15 June 2006.

Political offices
Preceded by Valgerður Sverrisdóttir	Minister for Nordic Cooperation; 2005–2006	Succeeded by Jónína Bjartmarz
Preceded by Siv Friðleifsdóttir	Minister for the Environment; 2004–2006	Succeeded by Jónína Bjartmarz
