= Siv Friðleifsdóttir =

Icelandic politician (born 1962)

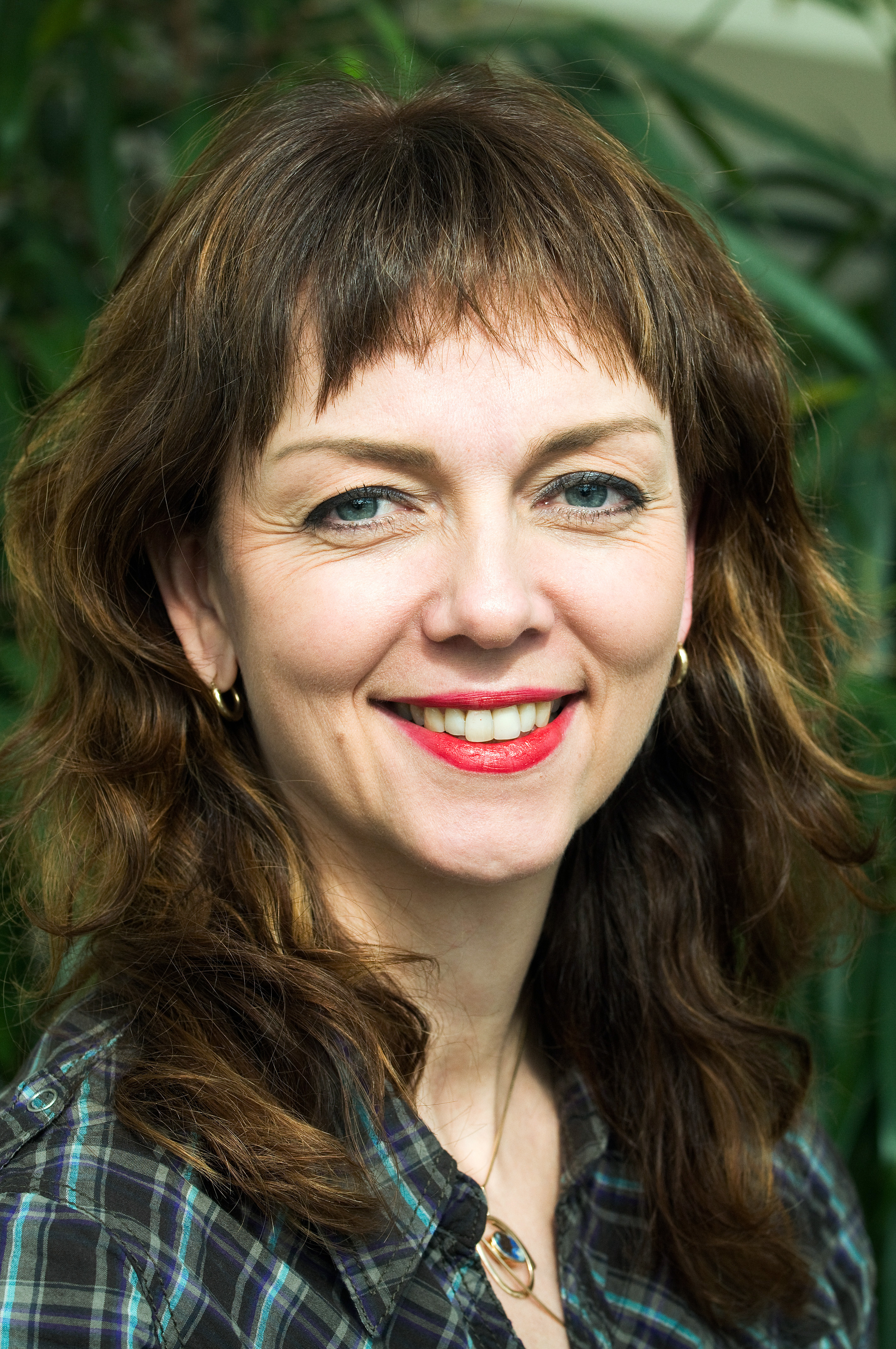

Minister of Health and Social Security
- In office 7 March 2006 – 24 May 2007
- Prime Minister: Geir Haarde
- Preceded by: Jón Kristjánsson
- Succeeded by: Guðlaugur Þór Þórðarson (as Minister of Health); Jóhanna Sigurðardóttir (as Minister of Social Affairs and Social Security)

Minister for the Environment
- In office 1999–2004
- Prime Minister: Davíð Oddsson; Halldór Ásgrímsson; Geir Haarde
- Preceded by: Guðmundur Bjarnason
- Succeeded by: Sigríður Anna Þórðardóttir

Personal details
- Born: 10 August 1962 (age 64) Oslo, Norway
- Party: Progressive Party
- Spouse: Þorsteinn Húnbogason
- Children: Two sons (b. 1985, 1993)
- Education: University of Iceland

Björg Siv Juhlin Friðleifsdóttir (born 10 August 1962), commonly known as Siv Friðleifsdóttir, is an Icelandic politician. She is half-Norwegian, having partly grown up in Norway, where she spent almost every summer next to the Oslofjord with her grandparents. She was a member of the Althing (Iceland's parliament) for the Progressive Party for the Reykjanes constituency from 1995 to 2003 and represented the Southwest Iceland constituency from 2003 to 2013. She has been Chairman of the Progressive Party parliamentary group since 2007, was Minister of Health and Social Security from 2006 to 2007, and Minister for the Environment and Minister for Nordic Cooperation from 1999 to 2004.

One of her notable policies was to make it illegal for strip clubs (and strippers) to operate in Iceland. This was made possible by parliament trying to develop feminist policies. Iceland's sex industry was shut down by feminist politicians on 30 July 2010. Under Siv's law, Iceland became the first European country to ban strip clubs.

Political offices
Preceded by Guðmundur Bjarnason	Minister for the Environment; 1999–2004	Succeeded by Sigríður Anna Þórðardóttir
Preceded by Halldór Ásgrímsson	Minister for Nordic Cooperation; 1999–2004	Succeeded by Valgerður Sverrisdóttir
Preceded by Jón Kristjánsson	Minister of Health and Social Security; 2006–2007	Succeeded by Guðlaugur Þór Þórðarson as Minister of Health
Preceded by Jón Kristjánsson	Minister of Health and Social Security; 2006–2007	Succeeded by Jóhanna Sigurðardóttir as Minister of Social Affairs and Social Security
