= Eiður Svanberg Guðnason =

Icelandic politician and diplomat

Ambassador of Iceland to China
- In office 2003–2006

Minister for the Environment, Nordic Cooperation
- In office 1991–1993
- Prime Minister: Davíð Oddsson
- Preceded by: Edvard Júlíus Sólnes (as both)
- Succeeded by: Össur Skarphéðinsson (Environment); Sighvatur Kristinn Björgvinsson (Nordic Cooperation)

Member of the Althing
- In office 1978–1993
- Constituency: Western

Personal details
- Born: 7 November 1939 Reykjavík, Kingdom of Iceland
- Died: 30 January 2017 (aged 77) Garðabær, Iceland
- Party: Social Democratic Party

Eiður Svanberg Guðnason (7 November 1939 – 30 January 2017) was an Icelandic politician and diplomat.

== Biography ==
Eiður was born on 7 November 1939 in Reykjavík. He served as Ambassador of Iceland to China from 28 November 2003 when he replaced Ólafur Egilsson. He served until 22 February 2007, when he was replaced with Gunnar Snorri Gunnarsson.

Eiður died on 30 January 2017 in Garðabær at the age of 77.

Political offices
| Preceded by Edvard Júlíus Sólnes | Minister for the Environment; 1991–1993 | Succeeded by Össur Skarphéðinsson |
| Preceded by Edvard Júlíus Sólnes | Minister for Nordic Cooperation; 1991–1993 | Succeeded by Sighvatur Kristinn Björgvinsson |
