= Sighvatur Kristinn Björgvinsson =

Icelandic politician (born 1942)

Sighvatur Kristinn Björgvinsson (born 23 January 1942) is an Icelandic politician and former minister. He was the Minister of Finance of Iceland from 1979 to 1980.

Political offices
| Preceded by Jón Sigurðsson | Minister of Commerce; Minister of Industry; 1991–1995 | Succeeded by Finnur Ingólfsson |
| Preceded by Eiður Svanberg Guðnason | Minister for Nordic Cooperation; 1993–1995 | Succeeded by Halldór Ásgrímsson |
| Preceded by Guðmundur Árni Stefánsson | Minister of Health and Social Security; 1994–1995 | Succeeded by Ingibjörg Pálmadóttir |
