= Þórunn Sveinbjarnardóttir =

Icelandic politician (born 1965)

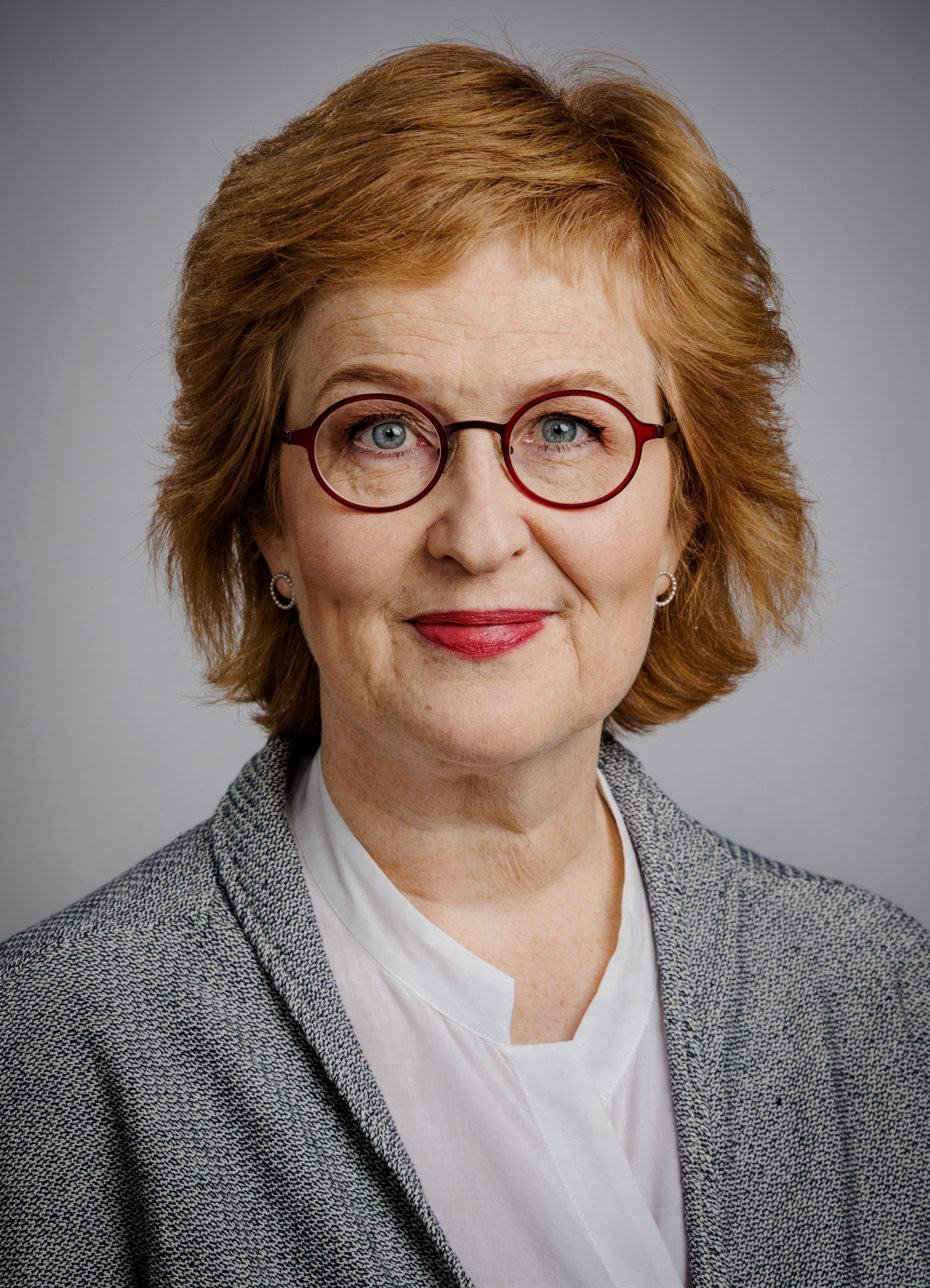
- Official portrait, 2021

Speaker of the Althing
- Incumbent
- Assumed office 4 February 2025
- President: Halla Tómasdóttir
- Prime Minister: Kristrún Frostadóttir
- Preceded by: Ásthildur Lóa Þórsdóttir (acting)

Minister for the Environment and Natural Resources
- In office 24 May 2007 – 1 February 2009
- Prime Minister: Geir Haarde
- Preceded by: Jónína Bjartmarz
- Succeeded by: Kolbrún Halldórsdóttir

Member of the Althing
- Incumbent
- Assumed office 25 September 2021
- Constituency: Southwest
- In office 8 May 1999 – 1 February 2011
- Constituency: Reykjanes (1999–2003); Southwest (2003–2011)

Personal details
- Born: 22 November 1965 (age 60) Reykjavík, Iceland
- Party: Social Democratic Alliance (2000–present)
- Other political affiliations: Women's List (1990–2000)
- Children: 1
- Education: University of Iceland; Johns Hopkins University

Þórunn Sveinbjarnardóttir (Note: Þ is the letter thorn, which in Icelandic represents a voiceless dental fricative, as in the English word "thick.") (born 22 November 1965) is an Icelandic politician who has served as Speaker of the Althing since 2025.

== Early life and education ==
Þórunn Sveinbjarnardóttir was born on 22 November 1965, to Sveinbjörn Hafliðason and Anna Huld Lárusdóttir. She matriculated in 1984. She graduated from the University of Iceland with a bachelor of arts degree in political science and media studies in 1989, from Johns Hopkins University with a master of arts in international politics in 1991, and from the University of Iceland with a master of arts in applied ethics in 2014.

== Career ==
Þórunn helped Vietnamese refugees while she worked for the Icelandic Red Cross from 1991 to 1992. She was an information office for the International Federation of Red Cross and Red Crescent Societies in Tanzania from 1995 to 1996, and in Azerbaijan from 1996 to 1997. She wrote for Morgunblaðið from 1998 to 1999. She was on the board of Landsvirkjun from 2013 to 2016.

At age 10, Þórunn participated in the 1975 Icelandic women's strike with her mother. Þórunn was on the student council and was an alternate member of the university council from 1987 to 1989. She was the chair of Röskva in 1988. She was the executive director of the Women's List from 1992 to 1995. She managed the Reykjavík List's campaign in the 1998 Reykjavík city council elections.

Þórunn represented Reykjanes from 1999 to 2003, and Southwest from 2003 to 2011, and since 2021. She was chair of the Social Democratic Alliance's parliamentary group from 2010 to 2011, and deputy chair from 2021 to 2025. She was elected Speaker of the Althing on 4 February 2025.

During Þórunn's tenure in the Althing she was a member of the Transport and Communications, Agriculture, and Health committees. She was deputy chair of the Foreign Affairs committee in 2009, and chair of the Social Affairs and Social Security committee in 2009, and Constitutional and Supervisory committee from 2021 to 2024.

From 24 May 2007 to 1 February 2009, Þórunn was Minister for the Environment and Natural Resources.

== Personal life ==
Þórunn is the mother of one child.

== Works cited ==
=== News ===
- Cochrane, Kira (3 October 2011). "Is Iceland the best country for women?". The Guardian. Archived from the original on 27 June 2025.

=== Web ===
- "Þórunn Sveinbjarnardóttir". Althing. Archived from the original on 27 June 2025.
- "Þórunn Sveinbjarnardóttir". Althing. Archived from the original on 7 April 2025.
- "Iceland". Inter-Parliamentary Union. Archived from the original on 27 June 2025.

Political offices
Preceded by Jónína Bjartmarz	Minister for the Environment; 2007–2009	Succeeded by Kolbrún Halldórsdóttir
Preceded by Ásthildur Lóa Þórsdóttir	Speaker of the Althing; 2025–present	Incumbent
