= Jón Sigurðsson (politician, born 1941) =

Icelandic politician

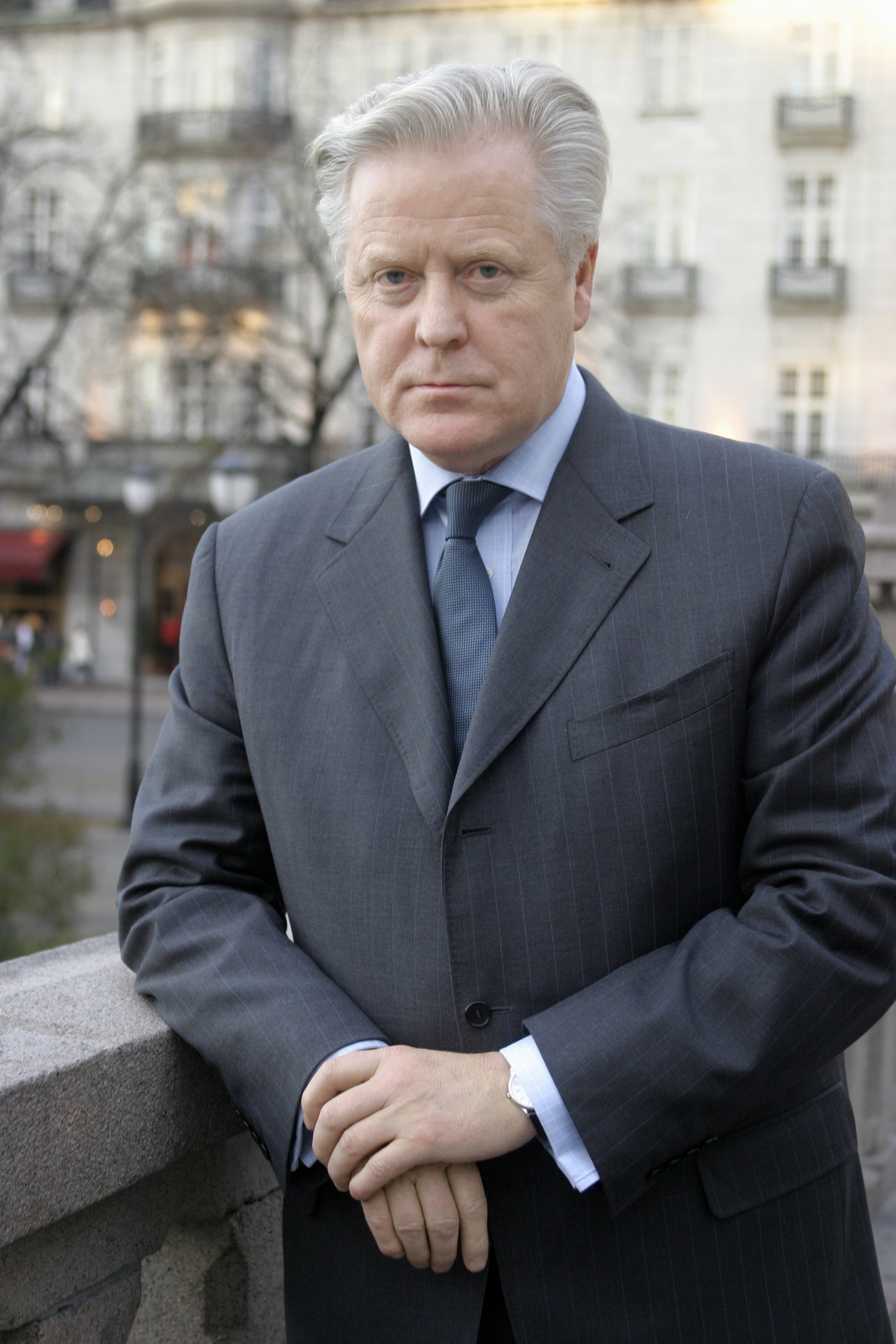
- Jón Sigurðsson in 2003

8th Minister of Justice and Ecclesiastical Affairs
- In office 8 July 1987 – 28 September 1988
- Prime Minister: Þorsteinn Pálsson
- Preceded by: Jón Helgason
- Succeeded by: Halldór Ásgrímsson

Minister of Industry and Commerce
- In office 28 September 1988 – 30 April 1991
- Prime Minister: Steingrímur Hermannsson
- In office 30 April 1991 – 14 June 1993
- Prime Minister: Davíð Oddsson
- Succeeded by: Sighvatur Kristinn Björgvinsson

Personal details
- Born: 17 April 1941 (age 85) Ísafjörður, Kingdom of Iceland
- Party: Social Democratic Party
- Spouse: Laufey Þorbjarnardóttir
- Children: 4

Jón Sigurðsson (born 17 April 1941) is an Icelandic politician and former minister. He was a member of parliament from 1987 to 1993 and served as the minister of justice and ecclesiastical affairs from 1987 to 1988 and the minister of industry and commerce from 1988 to 1993. After leaving parliament, he was the governor of the Central Bank of Iceland from 1993 to 1994.

Political offices
Preceded by Jón Helgason	Minister of Justice and Ecclesiastical Affairs; 1987–1988	Succeeded by Halldór Ásgrímsson
Preceded by Matthías Bjarnason	Minister of Commerce; 1987–1993	Succeeded by Sighvatur Kristinn Björgvinsson
Preceded by Matthías Árni Mathiesen	Minister for Nordic Cooperation; 1988–1989	Succeeded by Edvard Júlíus Sólnes
Preceded by Friðrik Klemenz Sophusson	Minister of Industry; 1988–1993	Succeeded by Sighvatur Kristinn Björgvinsson
