= Second cabinet of Katrín Jakobsdóttir =

Government of Iceland from 2021 to 2024

- 46th Cabinet of Iceland

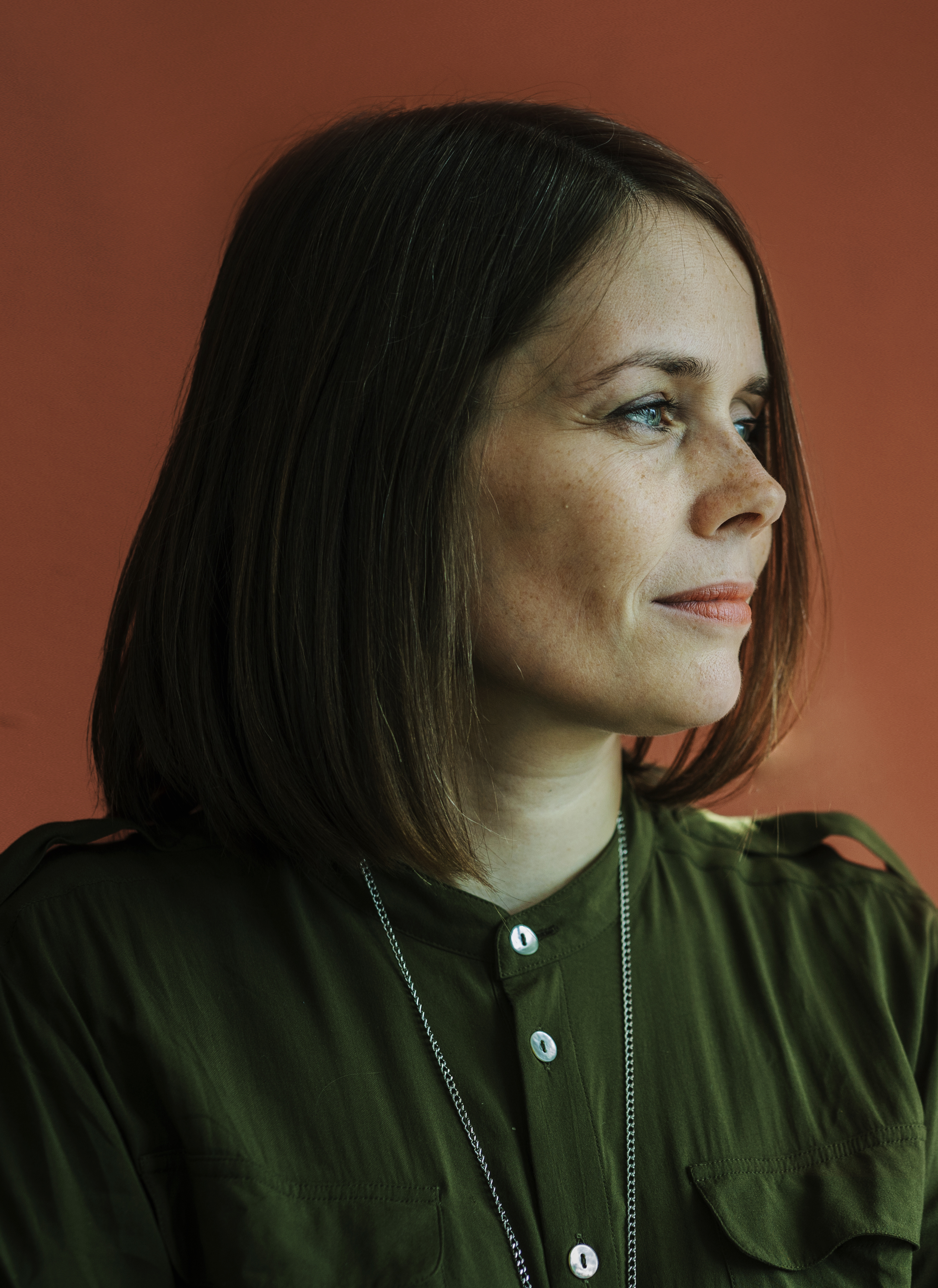
- Date formed: 28 November 2021
- Date dissolved: 9 April 2024

People and organisations
- President: Guðni Th. Jóhannesson
- Prime Minister: Katrín Jakobsdóttir
- No. of ministers: 13
- Member parties: Independence Party (D); Progressive Party (B); Left-Green Movement (V)
- Status in legislature: Majority government (coalition)
- Opposition parties: Social Democratic Alliance (S); People's Party (F); Pirate Party (P); Viðreisn (C); Centre Party (M)

History
- Election: 2021 parliamentary election
- Predecessor: Katrín Jakobsdóttir I
- Successor: Bjarni Benediktsson II

The Second cabinet of Katrín Jakobsdóttir, nicknamed “The advent government” (Icelandic: Aðventustjórnin), was formed on 28 November 2021, following the 2021 parliamentary election. The cabinet was led by Katrín Jakobsdóttir of the Left-Green Movement, who served as Prime Minister of Iceland.

The cabinet was a coalition government consisting of the Independence Party, the Left-Green Movement and the Progressive Party. Together they held 38 of the 63 seats in the Parliament of Iceland and served as a majority government. In the cabinet, there were twelve ministers, where five were from the Independence Party, three were from the Left-Green Movement and four were from the Progressive Party. After the 2021 parliamentary election, the three parties who were in power, in the last parliamentary session, increased their parliamentary majority.

== Cabinet ==
The Cabinet was composed as follows:

Portfolio	Minister	Took office	Left office	Party
Prime Minister	Katrín Jakobsdóttir	28 November 2021	9 April 2024	Left-Green
Minister of Finance and Economic Affairs	Bjarni Benediktsson	28 November 2021	14 October 2023	Independence
Minister of Finance and Economic Affairs	Þórdís Kolbrún R. Gylfadóttir	14 October 2023	9 April 2024	Independence
Minister of Infrastructure	Sigurður Ingi Jóhannsson	28 November 2021	9 April 2024	Progressive
Minister of Food, Fisheries and Agriculture	Svandís Svavarsdóttir	28 November 2021	9 April 2024	Left-Green
Minister for the Environment, Energy and Climate	Guðlaugur Þór Þórðarson	28 November 2021	9 April 2024	Independence
Minister for Foreign Affairs	Þórdís Kolbrún R. Gylfadóttir	28 November 2021	14 October 2023	Independence
Minister for Foreign Affairs	Bjarni Benediktsson	14 October 2023	9 April 2024	Independence
Minister of Culture and Business Affairs	Lilja Dögg Alfreðsdóttir	28 November 2021	9 April 2024	Progressive
Minister of Education and Children	Ásmundur Einar Daðason	28 November 2021	9 April 2024	Progressive
Minister of Social Affairs and the Labour Market	Guðmundur Ingi Guðbrandsson	28 November 2021	9 April 2024	Left-Green
Minister of Higher Education, Science And Innovation	Áslaug Arna Sigurbjörnsdóttir	28 November 2021	9 April 2024	Independence
Minister of the Interior	Jón Gunnarsson	28 November 2021	1 February 2022	Independence
Minister of Justice	Jón Gunnarsson	1 February 2022	18 June 2023	Independence
Minister of Justice	Guðrún Hafsteinsdóttir	19 June 2023	9 April 2024	Independence
Minister of Health	Willum Þór Þórsson	28 November 2021	9 April 2024	Progressive

== See also ==
- Government of Iceland
- Cabinet of Iceland
