= Valgerður Sverrisdóttir =

Icelandic politician (born 1950)

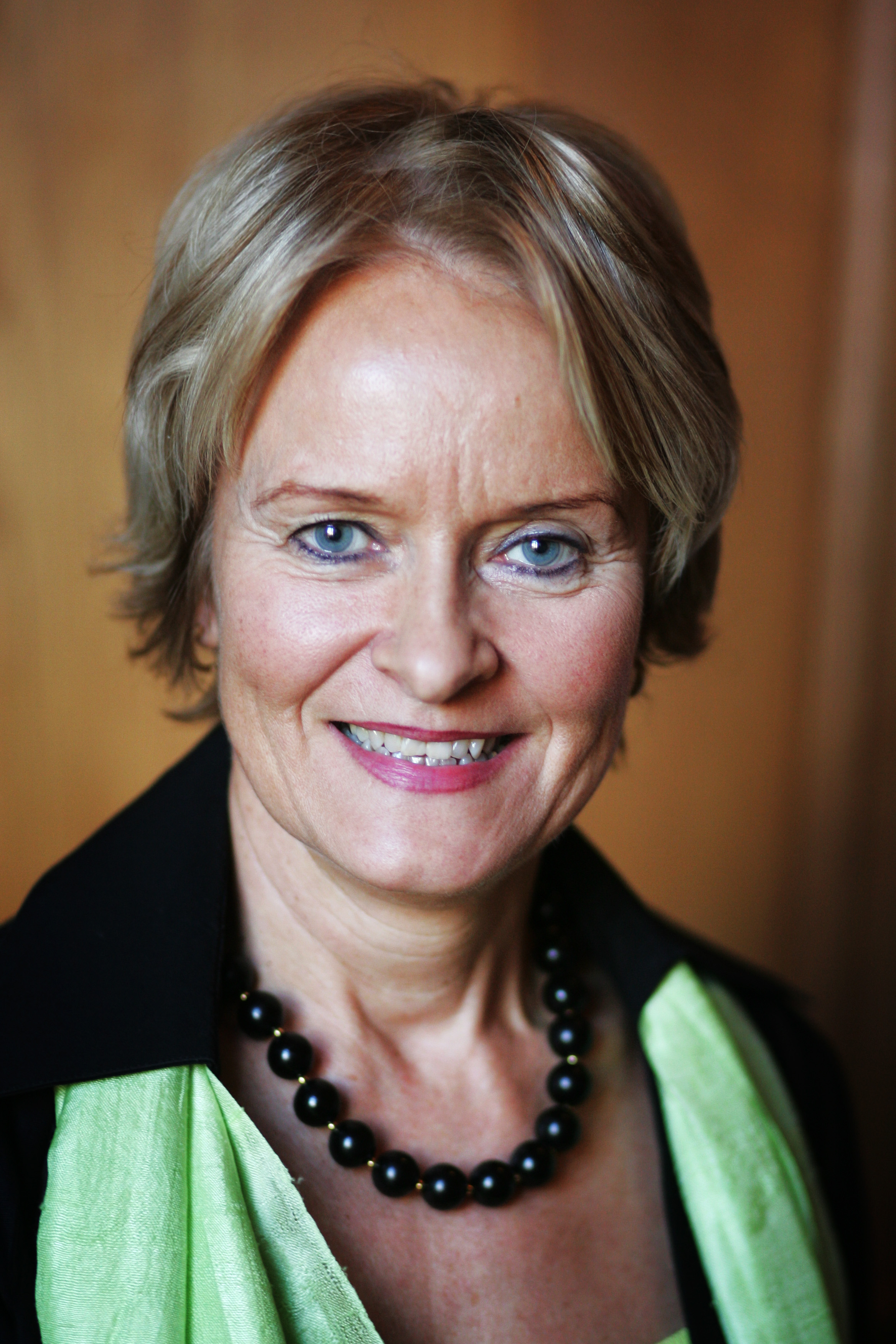
- Valgerður Sverrisdóttir in 2004

Minister for Foreign Affairs
- In office 15 June 2006 – 24 May 2007
- Prime Minister: Geir Haarde
- Preceded by: Geir Haarde
- Succeeded by: Ingibjörg Sólrún Gísladóttir

Minister of Industry and Commerce
- In office 28 May 1999 – 15 June 2006
- Prime Minister: Davíð Oddsson; Halldór Ásgrímsson
- Preceded by: Finnur Ingólfsson
- Succeeded by: Jón Sigurðsson

Personal details
- Born: 23 March 1950 (age 76) Lómatjörn, Grýtubakkahreppur, Iceland
- Party: Progressive Party
- Spouse: Arvid Kro
- Children: Three daughters (born 1978, 1982, 1989)

Valgerður Sverrisdóttir (born 23 March 1950) is an Icelandic politician. She was a member of the Althing (Iceland's parliament), for the Progressive Party for the Northeast constituency starting in 1987 and was Chairman of the Progressive Party parliamentary group from 1995 to 1999, Minister of Industry and Commerce from 1999 to 2006, and Minister for Nordic Cooperation from 2004 to 2005. She was Minister for Foreign Affairs from 15 June 2006 to 24 May 2007. She has been a member of the Progressive Party's central committee since 1983.

== Controversy ==
In 2006, Árni Finnsson, chairman of the Iceland Nature Conservation Association, accused Valgerður Sverrisdóttir of corruption for failing to reveal details of a report showing that the site of the Kárahnjúkavirkjun dam had active faults in the earth while she was Minister of Industry and Commerce.

Geophysicist Grímur Björnsson revealed on the television news programme Kastljós that a report he had prepared, criticizing the placement of the Kárahnjúkavirkjun dam, had been stamped as confidential by his superior at the time. Minister of Industry Valgerður Sverrisdóttir had subsequently failed to reveal the details of the report to parliament, as she was obliged to do.

Valgerður Sverrisdóttir rejected all accusations, claiming the controversy was a last-ditch effort by the opposition to delay the flooding of the Hálslón Reservoir. The flooding of the reservoir, which was set to take place at the end of September of the same year, subsequently submerged a large section of the Icelandic highlands.

Political offices
Preceded by Finnur Ingólfsson	Minister of Industry and Commerce; 1999–2006	Succeeded by Jón Sigurðsson
Preceded by Siv Friðleifsdóttir	Minister for Nordic Cooperation; 2004–2005	Succeeded by Sigríður Anna Þórðardóttir
Preceded by Geir H. Haarde	Minister for Foreign Affairs; 2006–2007	Succeeded by Ingibjörg Sólrún Gísladóttir
Party political offices
Preceded by Guðni Ágústsson	Chairman of the Progressive Party; 2008–2009	Succeeded by Sigmundur Davíð Gunnlaugsson
