= Kolbrún Halldórsdóttir =

Icelandic politician (born 1955)

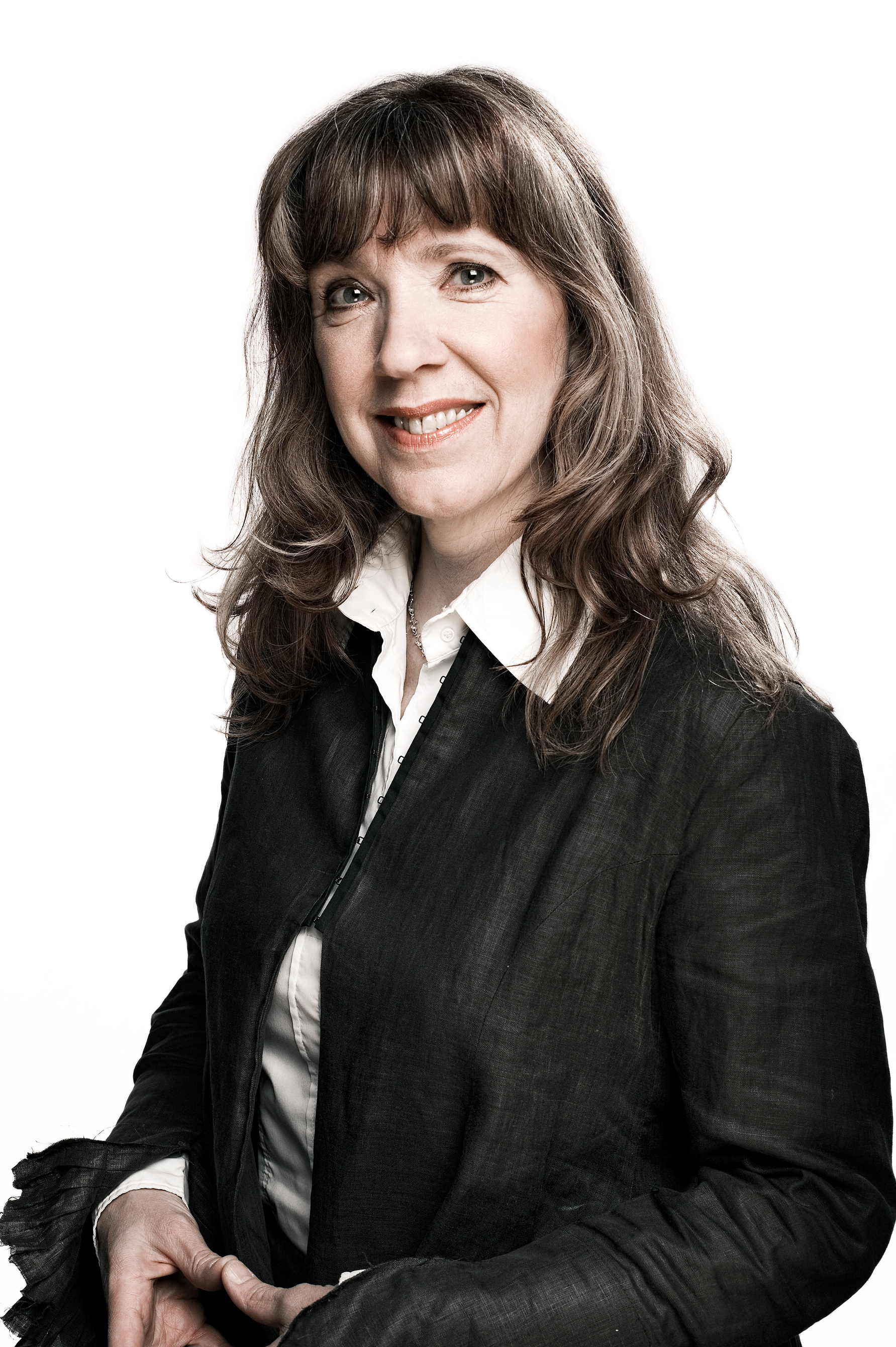

Minister for the Environment
- In office 1 February 2009 – 10 May 2009
- Prime Minister: Jóhanna Sigurðardóttir
- Preceded by: Þórunn Sveinbjarnardóttir
- Succeeded by: Svandís Svavarsdóttir

Personal details
- Born: 31 July 1955 (age 70) Reykjavík, Iceland
- Party: Left-Green Movement
- Spouse: Ágúst Pétursson
- Children: Two children

Kolbrún Halldórsdóttir (born 31 July 1955) is the chairman of BHM, the confederation of university graduates in Iceland. She is a former politician with the Left-Green Movement. She was a member of the Althing (Iceland's parliament) for Reykjavík constituencies from 1999. She was not re-elected in 2009. Halldórsdóttir was Minister for the Environment and Minister for Nordic Cooperation, in 2009. She has been s President of ECA – European Council of Artists (2011).

== Supporting prisoner artists ==
Kolbrún Halldórsdóttir, as the president of ECA, joined the biggest international campaign Freemuse for the release of Iranian musician Mehdi Rajabian and his brother, film-maker Hossein Rajabian; he was signed by the following of the ARJ group.

Political offices
| Preceded by Þórunn Sveinbjarnardóttir | Minister for the Environment | Succeeded by Svandís Svavarsdóttir |
| Preceded by Björgvin G. Sigurðsson | Minister for Nordic Cooperation | Incumbent |
