= Finnur Ingólfsson =

Icelandic politician (born 1954)

Finnur Ingólfsson (born 8 August 1954) is an Icelandic politician and former government minister. He was the governor of Central Bank of Iceland from 2000 to 2002.
