= Friðrik Klemenz Sophusson =

Icelandic politician

Minister of Finance
- In office 30 April 1991 – 16 April 1998
- Prime Minister: Davíð Oddsson
- Preceded by: Ólafur Ragnar Grímsson
- Succeeded by: Geir Haarde

Minister of Industry and Commerce
- In office 8 July 1987 – 28 December 1987
- Prime Minister: Þorsteinn Pálsson

Personal details
- Born: 18 October 1943 (age 82) Reykjavík, Iceland
- Party: Independence Party
- Education: University of Iceland
- Profession: lawyer

Friðrik Sophusson (born 18 October 1943 in Reykjavík) is an Icelandic politician and company director. He was the former director of Icelandic state-run energy firm Landsvirkjun.

== Career ==
Friðrik graduated from the University of Iceland in 1972, as a lawyer and was managing director of Management Association of Iceland between 1972 and 1978 when he took a seat in Parliament. was Minister of Industry and Commerce from 8 July until 28 December 1987 and Minister of Finance from 30 April 1991 until 16 April 1998. From 1998 until 2009 he was the director of Landsvirkjun. In 2010 he was announced as the chairman of the board of directors of Íslandsbanki, one of the three major Icelandic banks.

== Other activities ==
In his political career he has been a member of various committees and boards, e.g. the central committee of the conservative Independence Party. As director of Iceland's state-run energy firm Landsvirkjun, Friðrik has been among the most active proponents of the controversial hydro-electric dam at Kárahnjúkar in eastern Iceland.

== See also ==
- Politics of Iceland
- Kárahnjúkar Hydropower Plant

Political offices
Preceded by	Minister of Industry and Commerce; 1987	Succeeded by
Preceded by Ólafur Ragnar Grímsson	Minister of Finance; 1991–1998	Succeeded by Geir H. Haarde
