= Guðmundur Ingi Guðbrandsson =

Icelandic politician (born 1977)

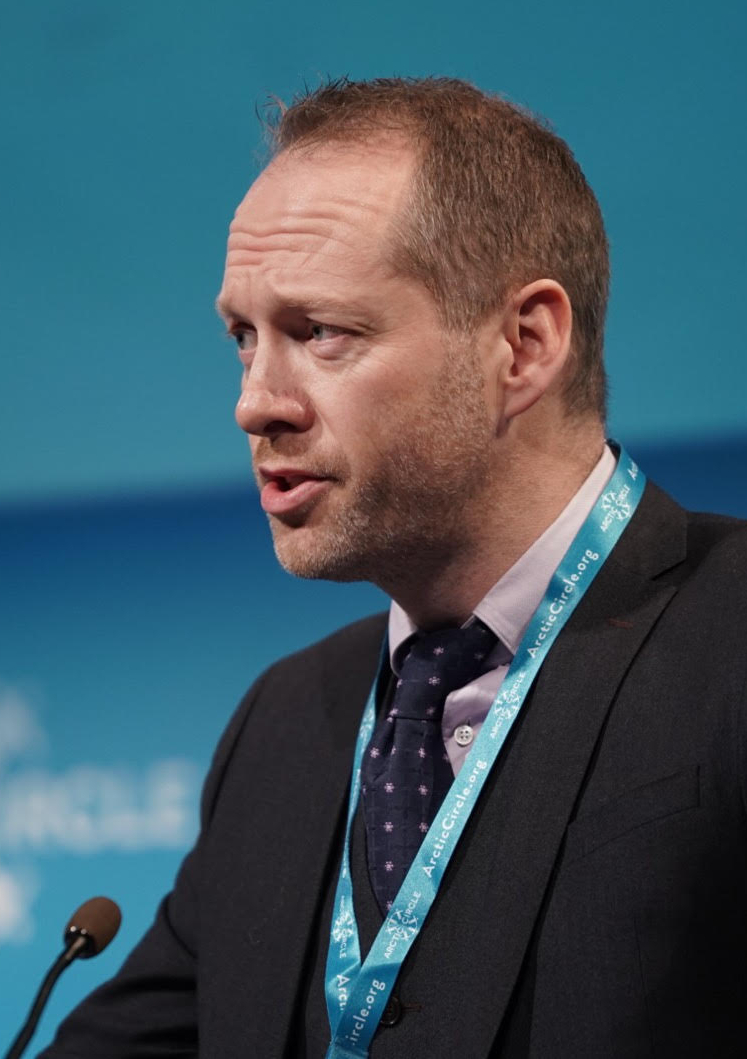
- Guðbrandsson in 2018

Minister for the Social Affairs and the Labour Market
- In office 28 November 2021 – 17 October 2024
- Prime Minister: Katrín Jakobsdóttir; Bjarni Benediktsson
- Preceded by: Ásmundur Einar Daðason (Social Affairs and Children)
- Succeeded by: Bjarni Benediktsson

Minister for the Environment and Natural Resources
- In office 30 November 2017 – 28 November 2021
- Prime Minister: Katrín Jakobsdóttir
- Preceded by: Björt Ólafsdóttir
- Succeeded by: Guðlaugur Þór Þórðarson (Environment, Energy, and Climate)

Personal details
- Born: 28 March 1977 (age 49) Brúarland, Iceland
- Party: Left-Green Movement
- Education: University of Iceland (B.Sc); Yale University (M.E.M.)

Guðmundur Ingi Guðbrandsson (born 28 March 1977) is a former member of parliament (Alþingi) in Iceland. He served as Minister of Social Affairs and the Labour Market, and concurrently as Minister for Nordic Co-operation, from 28 November 2021 to 17 October 2024. He represents the Left-Green Movement. He was Minister for the Environment and Natural Resources from 30 November 2017 to 28 November 2021. He has also been the CEO of Landvernd, the largest nature conservation and environmental NGO in Iceland, from 2011 to 2017. In 2017 he became the first openly gay man to become an Icelandic Minister. He is currently the vice-chair of the Left-Green Movement. Previously, he served as chair from April to October 2024 and as vice-chair from October 2019 to April 2024.

== Education and career ==
Guðbrandsson was raised on a farm. His intention was to be a sheep farmer. When he went to a secondary school in Akureyri, he started acting, and was interested in becoming an actor, but found out that he did not sing well enough. After graduation, he went to the Reykjavik household school, and then travelled to Germany, where he stayed in a monastery for a few months. He found out eventually that his faith was not strong enough to be a monk. Guðbrandsson holds a BSc degree in biology from the University of Iceland, and a master's degree in environmental science from Yale University. He has worked with research in ecology and environmental studies at the University of Iceland, and at the Soil Conservation Service of Iceland. He then worked at the Institute of Freshwater Fisheries in Hólar in Hjaltadalur. Since 2006, he has been a part-time teacher at the University of Iceland, the Agricultural University of Iceland, and the University Center of the Westfjords. He has also worked as a ranger in Þingvellir National Park, and Vatnajökull National Park.

He was one of the founders of the Icelandic Association of Environmentalists, and was the first chairman from 2007 to 2010. From 2011 to 2017, he was the CEO of Landvernd, an Icelandic environment association.

Political offices
Preceded by Björt Ólafsdóttir	Minister for the Environment and Natural Resources; 2017–2021	Succeeded by Guðlaugur Þór Þórðarson as Minister for the Environment, Energy and Climate
Preceded by Björt Ólafsdóttir as Minister of Social Affairs and Children	Minister for the Social Affairs and the Labour Market; 2021–2024	Succeeded by Bjarni Benediktsson
