= Citizens' Party (Iceland, 1987) =

Citizens' Party Borgaraflokkurinn
- Founded: 1987
- Dissolved: 1994
- Split from: Independence Party
- Ideology: Right-wing populism
- Political position: Right-wing

Election symbol
- S

The Citizens' Party (Icelandic: Borgaraflokkurinn) was a right-wing populist political party in Iceland which was formed in a split from the Independence Party in 1987. It disintegrated slowly until it ceased to exist in 1994.

Albert Guðmundsson was a minister for the Independence Party. However, after being implicated in a large financial lawsuit concerning the defunct shipping company Hafskip, he was deemed to be unsuitable to continue holding such office by his fellow party members.

In protest, he resigned from the party to form the Citizens' Party and with him went a significant number of other members. 1987 was an election year and The Citizen's Party managed a remarkable feat, having 7 members elected to the Alþingi.

In 1989, Albert resigned as chairman and was appointed as Iceland's ambassador to France. Two of the Members of Parliament then formed their own party (and later merged back into the Independence Party).

The remaining Members of Parliament joined the government on 10 September 1989 in a coalition with Social Democratic Party, People's Alliance and Progressive Party under the leadership of Steingrímur Hermannsson. This coalition lasted until 30 April 1991.

The Citizen's Party was entrusted with the offices of Minister of Justice and Minister of the Environment during their only stay in power.

In the 1991 elections, the Citizen's Party had fragmented so much that it did not enter.

== Members of Parliament ==
The following members represented the Citizens' Party on Alþingi between 1987 and 1991. It was a total of seven seats between 1987 and 1989, and five between 1989 and 1991 as two members formed their own party in 1989 and later merged into the Independence Party.

- Aðalheiður Bjarnfreðsdóttir
- Albert Guðmundsson
- Ásgeir Hannes Eiríksson
- Benedikt Bogason
- Guðmundur Ágústsson
- Guttormur Einarsson
- Hreggviður Jónsson (split 1989)
- Hulda Jensdóttir
- Ingi Björn Albertsson (split 1989)
- Júlíus Sólnes (Minister of the Environment)
- Kolbrún Jónsdóttir
- Ólafur Granz
- Óli Þ. Guðbjartsson (Minister of Justice)
