= Össur Skarphéðinsson =

Icelandic politician (born 1953)

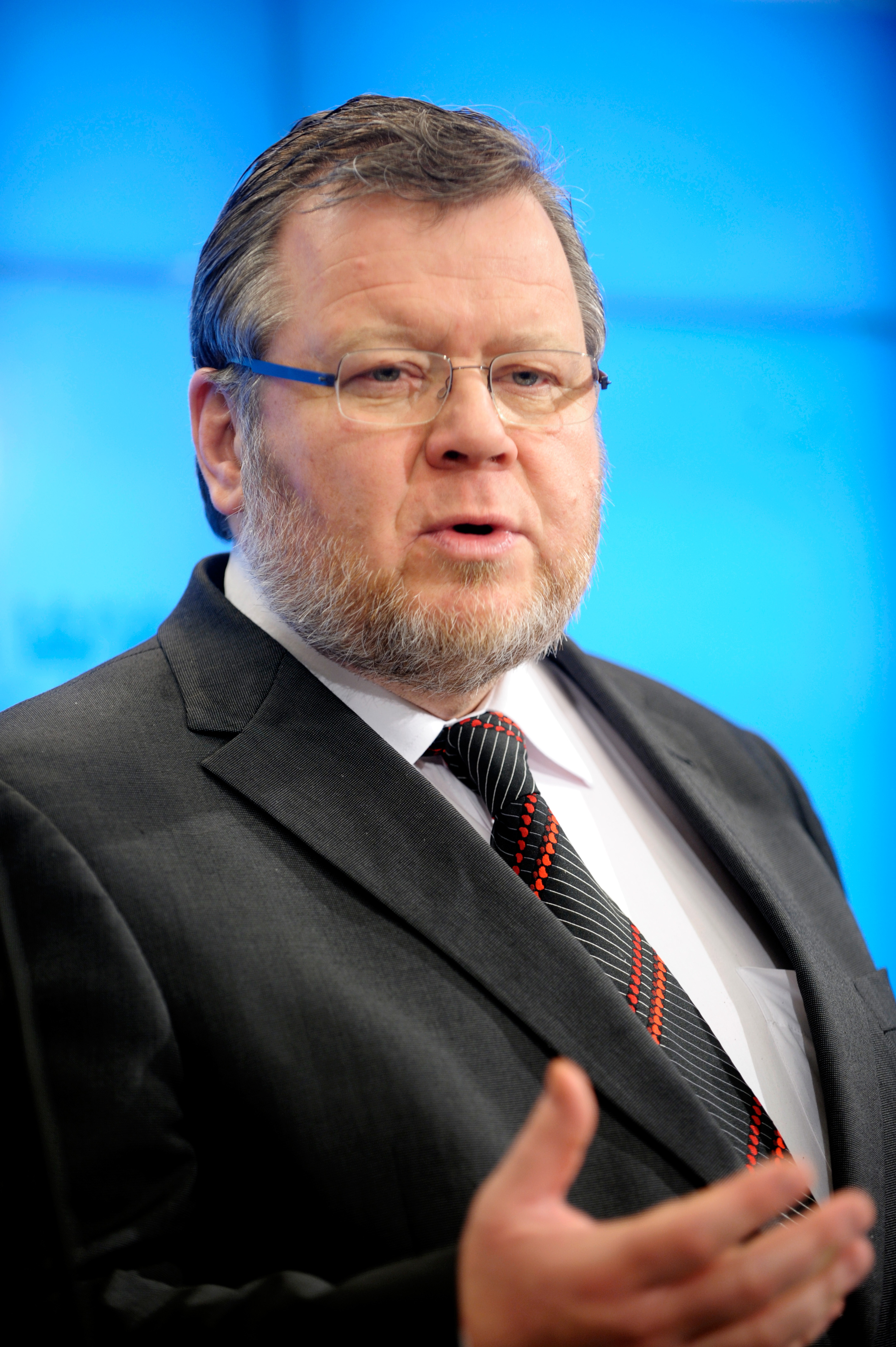

Minister for Foreign Affairs
- In office 1 February 2009 – 23 May 2013
- Prime Minister: Jóhanna Sigurðardóttir
- Preceded by: Ingibjörg Sólrún Gísladóttir
- Succeeded by: Gunnar Bragi Sveinsson

Minister for Industry, Energy and Tourism
- In office 24 May 2007 – 10 May 2009
- Prime Minister: Geir Haarde; Jóhanna Sigurðardóttir
- Preceded by: Jón Sigurðsson (as Minister of Industry and Commerce)
- Succeeded by: Katrín Júlíusdóttir

Nordic Cooperation
- In office 24 May 2007 – 10 June 2008
- Prime Minister: Geir Haarde

Minister for the Environment
- In office 1993–1995
- Prime Minister: Davíð Oddsson
- Succeeded by: Guðmundur Bjarnason

Member of the Althing
- In office 1991–2016

Personal details
- Born: 19 June 1953 (age 73) Reykjavík, Iceland
- Party: Social Democratic Alliance
- Spouse: Árný Erla Sveinbjörnsdóttir
- Children: Two daughters (b. 1994, 1998)
- Education: University of Iceland; University of East Anglia
- Profession: biologist, journalist

Össur Skarphéðinsson (pronounced [ˈœsːʏr ˈskar̥pçɛðɪnsɔn]; born 19 June 1953) is an Icelandic politician who served as Minister for Foreign Affairs from February 2009 to May 2013.

Össur matriculated from the Reykjavík Grammar School in 1973, and gained a BS in biology from the University of Iceland in 1979, and a doctorate from the University of East Anglia in 1983 entitled "The effect of photoperiod on the growth of the rainbow trout". He was a member of the parliament (Althing) for the Reykjavík Constituency from 1991 to 2003, and for Reykjavík North Constituency from 2003 to 2016. He was Chairman of the Social Democratic Party parliamentary group from 1991 to 1993, Minister for the Environment from 1993 to 1995, and Chairman of the Social Democratic Alliance from 2000 to 2005.

Össur was appointed Minister of Industry, Energy and Tourism for the Social Democratic Alliance in May 2007. He was also Minister for Nordic Cooperation from 24 May 2007 to 10 June 2008. In February 2009, he was appointed Minister for Foreign Affairs.

He lost the sight in one eye in a childhood accident.

Political offices
Preceded by Ingibjörg Sólrún Gísladóttir	Minister for Foreign Affairs; 2009-2013	Succeeded by Gunnar Bragi Sveinsson
Preceded by Jón Sigurðsson as Minister of Industry and Commerce	Minister of Industry, Energy and Tourism; 2007–2009	Succeeded by Katrín Júlíusdóttir
Preceded by Jónína Bjartmarz	Minister for Nordic Cooperation; 2007–2008	Succeeded by Björgvin G. Sigurðsson
Preceded by	Minister for the Environment; 1993–1995	Succeeded by Guðmundur Bjarnason
Party political offices
Preceded by Ingibjörg Sólrún Gísladóttir	Chairman of the Social Democratic Party; 1991–1993	Succeeded by Jóhanna Sigurðardóttir
Preceded by Margrét Frímannsdóttir as spokesperson	Chairman of the Social Democratic Alliance; 2000–2005	Succeeded by Ingibjörg Sólrún Gísladóttir
