= Ministry for the Environment and Natural Resources (Iceland) =

Government ministry of Iceland

Coordinates: 64°08′51″N 21°55′47″W

The Ministry for the Environment and Natural Resources (Icelandic: Umhverfis- og auðlindaráðuneytið) is an Icelandic cabinet-level ministry founded on 23 February 1990. It was originally called the Ministry for the Environment but was renamed to its current name on 1 September 2012. The Ministry oversees a wide range of matters as they relate to the environment, including nature conservation, wildlife protection, forest protection and revegitation efforts, environmental impact assessment, land use planning, pollution control and environmental health, fire prevention, meteorology, and mapping, including surveying and remote sensing. The current Minister for the Environment and Natural Resources is Guðmundur Ingi Guðbrandsson.

== Departments ==
The Ministry for the Environment and Natural Resources of Iceland comprises six departments:

- Department of Climate Action (Skrifstofa loftslagsmála)
- Department of Environment and Spatial Planning (Skrifstofa umhverfis og skipulags)
- Department of Finance and Administration (Skrifstofa fjármála og rekstrar)
- Department of Land and Natural Heritage (Skrifstofa landgæða)
- Department of the Permanent Secretary (Skrifstofa ráðuneytisstjóra)
- Department of Policy Coordination and International Affairs (Skrifstofa alþjóðamála og samþættingar)

=== Agencies ===
- Icelandic Meteorological Office (Veðurstofa Íslands)
- Environment Agency of Iceland (Umhverfisstofnun)
- Iceland Construction Authority (Mannvirkjastofnun)
- Icelandic Forest Service (Skógrækt ríkisins)
- Iceland GeoSurvey (Íslenskar orkurannsóknir)
- Icelandic Institute of Natural History (Náttúrufræðistofnun Íslands)
- Icelandic National Planning Agency (Skipulagsstofnun)
- Icelandic Recycling Fund (Úrvinnslusjóður)
- Institute of Freshwater Fisheries (Veiðimálastofnun)
- Myvatn Research Station (Náttúrurannsóknastöðin við Mývatn)
- National Land Survey of Iceland (Landmælingar Íslands)
- State Soil Conservation Service (Landgræðsla ríkisins)
- Stefansson Arctic Institute (Stofnun Vilhjálms Stefánssonar)
- Vatnajökull National Park (Vatnajökulsþjóðgarður)

== See also ==
- Environment and Transport Committee
