= Geir Haarde =

Icelandic politician (born 1951)

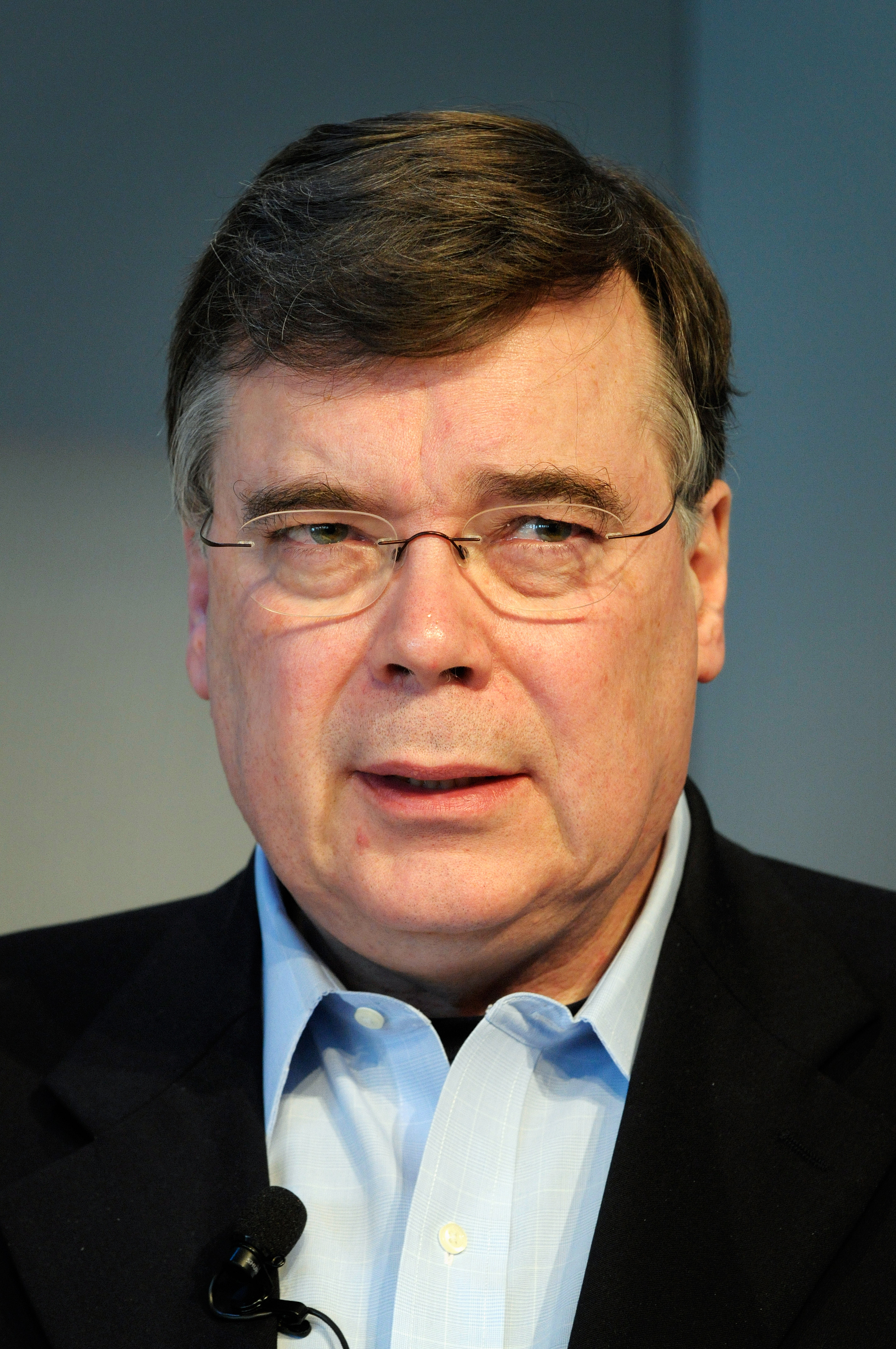
- Geir in 2008

Icelandic Ambassador to the United States
- In office 23 February 2015 – 1 July 2019
- President: Ólafur Ragnar Grímsson; Guðni Th. Jóhannesson
- Prime Minister: Sigmundur Davíð Gunnlaugsson; Sigurður Ingi Jóhannsson; Bjarni Benediktsson; Katrín Jakobsdóttir
- Preceded by: Guðmundur Árni Stefánsson
- Succeeded by: Bergdís Ellertsdóttir

27th Prime Minister of Iceland
- In office 15 June 2006 – 1 February 2009
- President: Ólafur Ragnar Grímsson
- Preceded by: Halldór Ásgrímsson
- Succeeded by: Jóhanna Sigurðardóttir

President of the Nordic Council
- In office 1 January 1995 – 31 December 1995
- Preceded by: Per Olof Håkansson
- Succeeded by: Knud Enggaard

Leader of the Independence Party
- In office 16 October 2005 – 29 March 2009
- Preceded by: Davíð Oddsson
- Succeeded by: Bjarni Benediktsson

Minister of Foreign Affairs
- In office 27 September 2005 – 15 June 2006
- Prime Minister: Halldór Ásgrímsson
- Preceded by: Davíð Oddsson
- Succeeded by: Valgerður Sverrisdóttir

Minister of Finance
- In office 16 April 1998 – 27 September 2005
- Prime Minister: Davíð Oddsson; Halldór Ásgrímsson
- Preceded by: Friðrik Sophusson
- Succeeded by: Árni M. Mathiesen

Personal details
- Born: Geir Hilmar Haarde; 8 April 1951 (age 75) Reykjavík, Iceland
- Party: Independence Party
- Spouse(s): Patricia Angelina (Divorced); Inga Jóna Þórðardóttir
- Education: Brandeis University; Johns Hopkins University; University of Minnesota, Twin Cities

Geir Hilmar Haarde (Icelandic pronunciation: [ˈceːir̥ ˈhɪlmar̥ ˈhɔrtɛ]; born 8 April 1951) is an Icelandic politician who served as prime minister of Iceland from 15 June 2006 to 1 February 2009, and as president of the Nordic Council in 1995. Geir was chairman of the Icelandic Independence Party from 2005 to 2009. From 2015 to 2019 he served as the ambassador of Iceland to the United States and several Latin American countries. Since 2019 he has been a chief representative at the World Bank Group.

Geir initially led a coalition between his party and the Progressive Party. After the 2007 parliamentary election, in which the Independence Party increased its share of the vote, Geir renewed his term as prime minister, leading a coalition between his party and the Social Democratic Alliance. That coalition resigned in January 2009 after widespread protests following an economic collapse in October 2008. In September 2010, Geir became the first Icelandic minister to be indicted for misconduct in office, and stood trial before the Landsdómur, a special court for such cases. He was convicted on one count, but acquitted of the most serious violations.

== Life and career ==
Geir was born in the Icelandic capital Reykjavík, to Tomas Haarde, a Norwegian from Rogaland, and an Icelandic mother. He is the brother of Bernhard Haarde, former leader of the Icelandic branch of the World Union of National Socialists. He received his bachelor's degree in the United States at Brandeis University as a Wien Scholar, graduating with a degree in economics, then went on to earn two Master's degrees – in international relations from the School of Advanced International Studies of The Johns Hopkins University and in economics from the University of Minnesota.

Prior to entering the Althing (the Icelandic Parliament), Geir was an economist at the Central Bank of Iceland from 1977 to 1983 and was a political adviser to the Icelandic Minister of Finance from 1983 to 1987. He was a member of the Althing for 22 years, 1987–2009. Geir was Chairman of the Independence Party Parliamentary Group from 1991 to 1998 and a member of the Alþing's Foreign Affairs Committee from 1991 to 1998; he was Chairman of the Foreign Affairs Committee from 1995 to 1998. He served as Minister of Finance from April 1998 to September 2005 and then as Minister for Foreign Affairs from September 2005 to June 2006. He was elected Chairman of the Independence Party in an uncontested election in October 2005, following the departure of Davíð Oddsson.

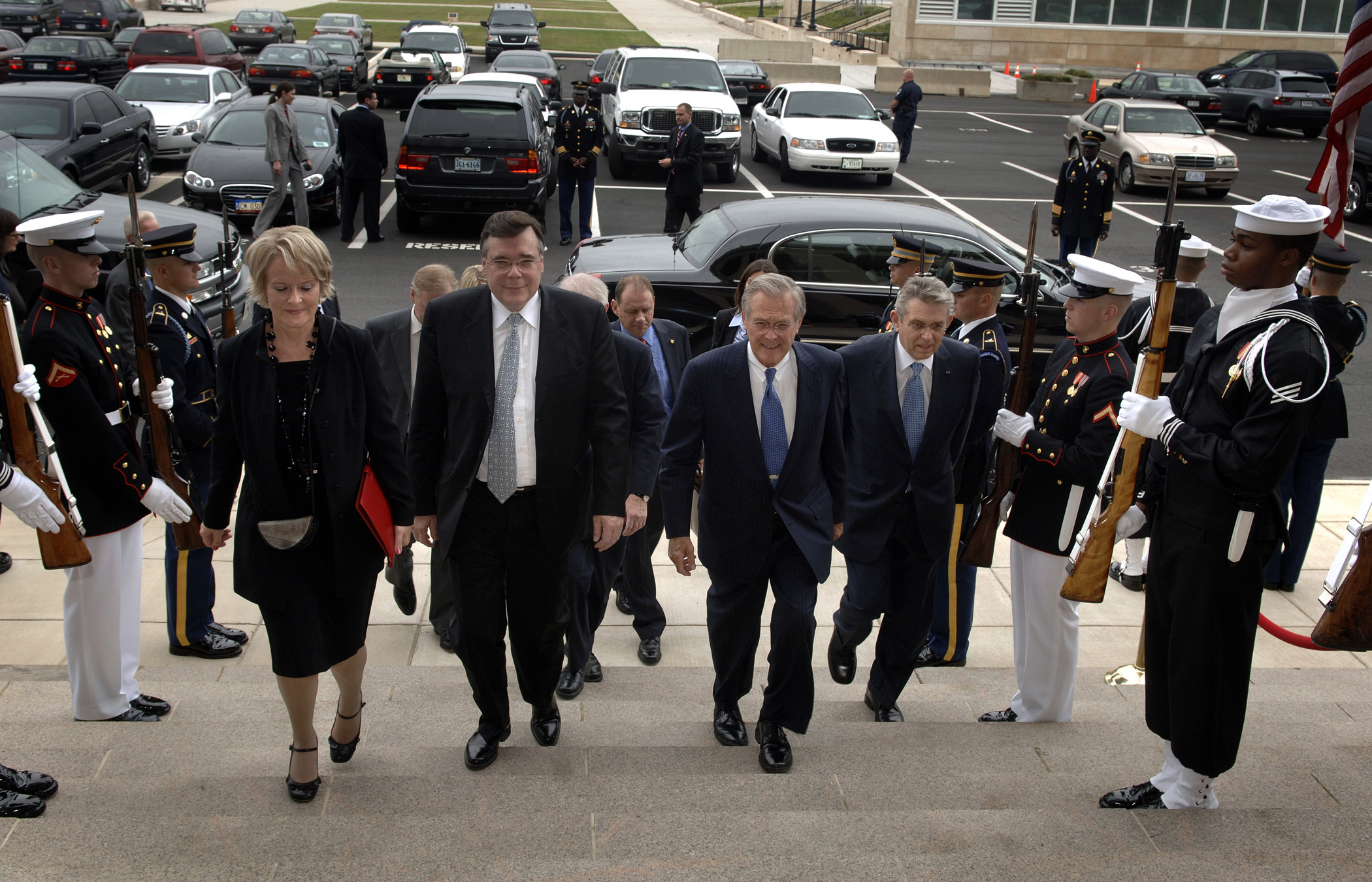
Valgerður Sverrisdóttir, Geir Haarde, Donald Rumsfeld and Björn Bjarnason at the Pentagon in October, 2006

Following the announcement of Halldór Ásgrímsson's resignation as Prime Minister on 5 June 2006, Geir succeeded him as Prime Minister on 15 June.

On 23 January 2009, Geir announced that for health reasons (malignant oesophageal tumour), he would step down as chairman of the Independence Party at the next party congress on 26–29 March 2009. On the same day, he announced that an early general election would be held on 9 May 2009, in which he would not be a candidate.

== Icelandic financial crisis ==
The end of Geir's tenure as prime minister was marked by the dramatic financial crisis which engulfed Iceland from October 2008. In less than a week, the country's three major commercial banks (Glitnir, Landsbanki and Kaupthing) all had to be taken over by the government as they were unable to roll over their loans.

On 26 January 2009, Geir announced that he and the Social Democrats would not continue in the coalition government. He was replaced by Jóhanna Sigurðardóttir from the Social Democratic Alliance, formerly minister of Social Affairs and Social Security, on 1 February 2009.

== Special tribunal ==
Geir was strongly criticised in the April 2010 report of the Special Investigative Commission into the financial collapse, being accused of "negligence" along with three other ministers of his government.

On 28 September 2010, Iceland's parliament, Althing, voted 33–30 to indict Geir, but not the other ministers, on charges of negligence in office at a session. He was to stand trial before the Landsdómur, a special tribunal to hear cases alleging misconduct in government office: it was the first time Landsdómur has convened since it was established in the 1905 Constitution.

On 3 October 2011, in response to a motion by the defence team to dismiss the case, Landsdómur voted to drop the two first charges against Geir Haarde, concerning "gross negligence" and "failure to have the financial risks assessed," but to continue with the case based on three remaining and lesser charges.

At its 40th national convention on 17–20 November 2011, the Independence Party concluded that "accusations against Geir H. Haarde, the former leader of the Independence Party and former Prime Minister, constituted an abhorrent political trial. The convention declared its unequivocal support for Mr. Haarde while noting the serious precedent the parliament had set with its decision to prosecute."

The trial began in Reykjavík on 5 March 2012. Geir Haarde was found guilty on one of four charges on 23 April 2012, for not addressing the problems that Icelandic banks were facing or their potential consequences for Iceland's economy at cabinet meetings. Due to his age, no previous criminal record and the acquittal of the most serious charges, Geir was not sentenced in the case, and the Icelandic State paid his legal expenses. Geir decided, as a matter of principle, to refer the whole case to the European Court of Human Rights in Strasbourg; in November 2017, the court ruled against him.

== Notes and references ==
Political offices
Preceded by Friðrik Sophusson	Minister of Finance; 1998–2005	Succeeded by Árni Mathiesen
Preceded by Davíð Oddsson	Minister for Foreign Affairs; 2005–2006	Succeeded by Valgerður Sverrisdóttir
Preceded by Halldór Ásgrímsson	Prime Minister of Iceland; 2006–2009	Succeeded by Jóhanna Sigurðardóttir
Party political offices
Preceded by Davíð Oddsson	Leader of the Independence Party; 2005–2009	Succeeded by Bjarni Benediktsson
