= Eastern (Althing constituency) =

Former constituency of the Althing, the national legislature of Iceland

- Austurland
- Former Constituency for the Althing
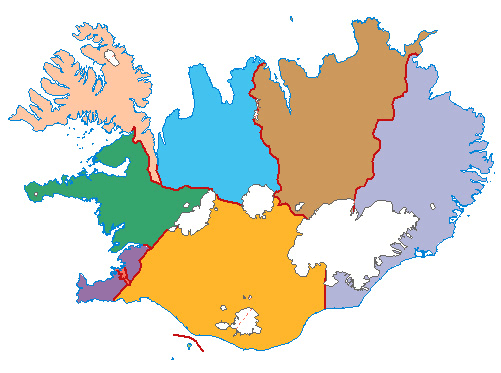
- Althing constituencies between 1959 and 2003
- Municipality: List: Austur-Hérað; Borgarfjarðarhreppur; Breiðdalshreppur; Búðahreppur; Djúpavogshreppur; Fáskrúðsfjarðarhreppur; Fellahreppur; Fjarðabyggð; Fljótsdalshreppur; Mjóafjarðarhreppur; Norður-Hérað; Seyðisfjörður; Skeggjastaðahreppur; Stöðvarhreppur; Sveitarfélagið Hornafjörður; Vopnafjarðarhreppur
- Region: Eastern

Former Constituency
- Created: 1959
- Abolished: 2003
- Seats: List (Note: Excludes compensatory seats.): 4 (1987–2003); 5 (1959–1987)
- Created from: List: East Skaftafellssýsla; North Múlasýsla; Seyðisfjörður; South Múlasýsla
- Replaced by: List: Northeast; South

Eastern (Icelandic: Austurland) was one of the multi-member constituencies of the Althing, the national legislature of Iceland. The constituency was established in 1959 following the nationwide extension of proportional representation for elections to the Althing. It was abolished in 2003 when the constituency was merged into the Northeastern and Southern constituencies following the re-organisation of constituencies across Iceland. Eastern was conterminous with the Eastern region.

== Election results ==
=== Summary ===
Election	People's Alliance G			Left-Green U			Social Democrats S / A			Progressive B			Independence D		
Election	Votes	%	Seats	Votes	%	Seats	Votes	%	Seats	Votes	%	Seats	Votes	%	Seats
1999				791	10.96%	0	1,530	21.20%	1	2,771	38.40%	2	1,901	26.34%	1
1995	1,257	16.08%	1				577	7.38%	0	3,668	46.92%	2	1,760	22.51%	1
1991	1,519	19.22%	1				803	10.16%	0	3,225	40.81%	2	1,683	21.30%	1
1987	1,845	22.96%	1				556	6.92%	0	3,091	38.47%	2	1,296	16.13%	1
1983	2,091	29.85%	2				279	3.98%	0	2,655	37.90%	2	1,714	24.46%	1
1979	2,154	31.22%	2				414	6.00%	0	2,963	42.94%	2	1,369	19.84%	1
1978	2,455	36.46%	2				563	8.36%	0	2,434	36.15%	2	1,063	15.79%	1
1974	1,595	25.31%	1				195	3.09%	0	2,676	42.47%	3	1,344	21.33%	1
1971	1,435	24.85%	1				293	5.07%	0	2,564	44.41%	3	1,146	19.85%	1
1967	1,017	18.86%	1				286	5.30%	0	2,894	53.67%	3	1,195	22.16%	1
1963	905	17.38%	1				250	4.80%	0	2,804	53.86%	3	1,104	21.21%	1
1959 Oct	989	18.83%	1				215	4.09%	0	2,920	55.59%	3	1,129	21.49%	1

(Excludes compensatory seats.)

=== Detailed ===
==== 1990s ====
===== 1999 =====
Results of the 1999 parliamentary election held on 8 May 1999:

Party		Votes	%	Seats		
Party		Votes	%	Con.	Com.	Tot.
Progressive Party	B	2,771	38.40%	2	0	2
Independence Party	D	1,901	26.34%	1	0	1
Social Democratic Alliance	S	1,530	21.20%	1	0	1
Left-Green Movement	U	791	10.96%	0	1	1
Liberal Party	F	209	2.90%	0	0	0
Humanist Party	H	14	0.19%	0	0	0
Valid votes		7,216	100.00%	4	1	5
Blank votes		149	2.02%			
Rejected votes – other		27	0.37%			
Total polled		7,392	85.45%			
Registered electors		8,651				

The following candidates were elected: Arnbjörg Sveinsdóttir (D), 1,892 votes; Einar Már Sigurðarson (S), 1,529 votes; Halldór Ásgrímsson (B), 2,769 votes; Jón Kristjánsson (B), 2,766 votes; and Þuríður Backman (U), 790 votes.

===== 1995 =====
Results of the 1995 parliamentary election held on 8 April 1995:

Party		Votes	%	Seats		
Party		Votes	%	Con.	Com.	Tot.
Progressive Party	B	3,668	46.92%	2	0	2
Independence Party	D	1,760	22.51%	1	1	2
People's Alliance	G	1,257	16.08%	1	0	1
Social Democratic Party	A	577	7.38%	0	0	0
National Awakening	J	365	4.67%	0	0	0
Women's List	V	191	2.44%	0	0	0
Valid votes		7,818	100.00%	4	1	5
Blank votes		111	1.40%			
Rejected votes – other		16	0.20%			
Total polled		7,945	87.95%			
Registered electors		9,034				

The following candidates were elected: Arnbjörg Sveinsdóttir (D), 1,754 votes; Egill Jónsson (D), 1,689 votes; Halldór Ásgrímsson (B), 3,667 votes; Hjörleifur Guttormsson (G), 1,206 votes; and Jón Kristjánsson (B), 3,647 votes.

===== 1991 =====
Results of the 1991 parliamentary election held on 20 April 1991:

Party		Votes	%	Seats		
Party		Votes	%	Con.	Com.	Tot.
Progressive Party	B	3,225	40.81%	2	0	2
Independence Party	D	1,683	21.30%	1	0	1
People's Alliance	G	1,519	19.22%	1	0	1
Social Democratic Party	A	803	10.16%	0	1	1
Women's List	V	348	4.40%	0	0	0
National Party and Humanist Party	Þ	210	2.66%	0	0	0
Home Rule Association	H	89	1.13%	0	0	0
Liberals	F	25	0.32%	0	0	0
Valid votes		7,902	100.00%	4	1	5
Blank votes		130	1.61%			
Rejected votes – other		21	0.26%			
Total polled		8,053	88.40%			
Registered electors		9,110				

The following candidates were elected: Egill Jónsson (D), 1,617 votes; Gunnlaugur Stefánsson (A), 803 votes; Halldór Ásgrímsson (B), 3,219 votes; Hjörleifur Guttormsson (G), 1,475 votes; and Jón Kristjánsson (B), 3,205 votes.

==== 1980s ====
===== 1987 =====
Results of the 1987 parliamentary election held on 25 April 1987:

Party		Votes	%	Seats		
Party		Votes	%	Con.	Com.	Tot.
Progressive Party	B	3,091	38.47%	2	0	2
People's Alliance	G	1,845	22.96%	1	0	1
Independence Party	D	1,296	16.13%	1	1	2
Social Democratic Party	A	556	6.92%	0	0	0
Women's List	V	508	6.32%	0	0	0
National Party	Þ	407	5.07%	0	0	0
Citizens' Party	S	262	3.26%	0	0	0
Humanist Party	M	69	0.86%	0	0	0
Valid votes		8,034	100.00%	4	1	5
Blank votes		82	1.01%			
Rejected votes – other		33	0.40%			
Total polled		8,149	90.33%			
Registered electors		9,021				

The following candidates were elected: Egill Jónsson (D), 1,289 votes; Halldór Ásgrímsson (B), 3,090 votes; Hjörleifur Guttormsson (G), 1,839 votes; Jón Kristjánsson (B), 3,033 votes; and Sverrir Hermannsson (D), 1,263 votes.

===== 1983 =====
Results of the 1983 parliamentary election held on 23 April 1983:

Party		Votes	%	Seats		
Party		Votes	%	Con.	Com.	Tot.
Progressive Party	B	2,655	37.90%	2	0	2
People's Alliance	G	2,091	29.85%	2	0	2
Independence Party	D	1,714	24.46%	1	1	2
Social Democratic Party	A	279	3.98%	0	0	0
Alliance of Social Democrats	C	267	3.81%	0	0	0
Valid votes		7,006	100.00%	5	1	6
Blank votes		197	2.73%			
Rejected votes – other		19	0.26%			
Total polled		7,222	89.37%			
Registered electors		8,081				

The following candidates were elected: Egill Jónsson (D), 1,543 votes; Halldór Ásgrímsson (B), 2,655 votes; Helgi Seljan (G), 2,091 votes; Hjörleifur Guttormsson (G), 1,882 votes; Sverrir Hermannsson (D), 1,714 votes; and Tómas Árnason (B), 2,390 votes.

==== 1970s ====
===== 1979 =====
Results of the 1979 parliamentary election held on 2 and 3 December 1979:

Party		Votes	%	Seats		
Party		Votes	%	Con.	Com.	Tot.
Progressive Party	B	2,963	42.94%	2	0	2
People's Alliance	G	2,154	31.22%	2	0	2
Independence Party	D	1,369	19.84%	1	1	2
Social Democratic Party	A	414	6.00%	0	0	0
Valid votes		6,900	100.00%	5	1	6
Blank votes		140	1.99%			
Rejected votes – other		9	0.13%			
Total polled		7,049	91.75%			
Registered electors		7,683				

The following candidates were elected: Egill Jónsson (D), 1,224 votes; Halldór Ásgrímsson (B), 2,666 votes; Helgi Seljan (G), 2,154 votes; Hjörleifur Guttormsson (G), 1,934 votes; Sverrir Hermannsson (D), 1,359 votes; and Tómas Árnason (B), 2,955 votes.

===== 1978 =====
Results of the 1978 parliamentary election held on 25 June 1978:

Party		Votes	%	Seats		
Party		Votes	%	Con.	Com.	Tot.
People's Alliance	G	2,455	36.46%	2	1	3
Progressive Party	B	2,434	36.15%	2	0	2
Independence Party	D	1,063	15.79%	1	0	1
Social Democratic Party	A	563	8.36%	0	0	0
Union of Liberals and Leftists	F	218	3.24%	0	0	0
Valid votes		6,733	100.00%	5	1	6
Blank votes		119	1.73%			
Rejected votes – other		18	0.26%			
Total polled		6,870	92.25%			
Registered electors		7,447				

The following candidates were elected: Helgi Seljan (G), 2,210 votes; Hjörleifur Guttormsson (G), 1,953 votes; Lúðvík Jósepsson (G), 2,446 votes; Sverrir Hermannsson (D), 1,045 votes; Tómas Árnason (B), 2,171 votes; and Vilhjálmur Hjálmarsson (B), 2,427 votes.

===== 1974 =====
Results of the 1974 parliamentary election held on 30 June 1974:

Party		Votes	%	Seats		
Party		Votes	%	Con.	Com.	Tot.
Progressive Party	B	2,676	42.47%	3	0	3
People's Alliance	G	1,595	25.31%	1	1	2
Independence Party	D	1,344	21.33%	1	0	1
Union of Liberals and Leftists	F	491	7.79%	0	0	0
Social Democratic Party	A	195	3.09%	0	0	0
Valid votes		6,301	100.00%	5	1	6
Blank votes		22	0.34%			
Rejected votes – other		54	0.85%			
Total polled		6,377	93.78%			
Registered electors		6,800				

The following candidates were elected: Halldór Ásgrímsson (B), 2,150 votes; Helgi Seljan (G), 798 votes; Lúðvík Jósepsson (G), 1,594 votes; Sverrir Hermannsson (D), 1,334 votes; Tómas Árnason (B), 2,388 votes; and Vilhjálmur Hjálmarsson (B), 2,674 votes.

===== 1971 =====
Results of the 1971 parliamentary election held on 13 June 1971:

Party		Votes	%	Seats		
Party		Votes	%	Con.	Com.	Tot.
Progressive Party	B	2,564	44.41%	3	0	3
People's Alliance	G	1,435	24.85%	1	1	2
Independence Party	D	1,146	19.85%	1	0	1
Union of Liberals and Leftists	F	336	5.82%	0	0	0
Social Democratic Party	A	293	5.07%	0	0	0
Valid votes		5,774	100.00%	5	1	6
Blank votes		78	1.33%			
Rejected votes – other		23	0.39%			
Total polled		5,875	91.53%			
Registered electors		6,419				

The following candidates were elected: Eysteinn Jónsson (B), 2,564 votes; Helgi Seljan (G), 718 votes; Lúðvík Jósepsson (G), 1,435 votes; Páll Þorsteinsson (B), 2,306 votes; Sverrir Hermannsson (D), 1,126 votes; and Vilhjálmur Hjálmarsson (B), 2,051 votes.

==== 1960s ====
===== 1967 =====
Results of the 1967 parliamentary election held on 11 June 1967:

Party		Votes	%	Seats		
Party		Votes	%	Con.	Com.	Tot.
Progressive Party	B	2,894	53.67%	3	0	3
Independence Party	D	1,195	22.16%	1	0	1
People's Alliance	G	1,017	18.86%	1	0	1
Social Democratic Party	A	286	5.30%	0	0	0
Valid votes		5,392	100.00%	5	0	5
Blank votes		91	1.65%			
Rejected votes – other		21	0.38%			
Total polled		5,504	91.23%			
Registered electors		6,033				

The following candidates were elected: Eysteinn Jónsson (B), 2,894 votes; Jónas Pétursson (D), 1,185 votes; Lúðvík Jósepsson (G), 1,017 votes; Páll Þorsteinsson (B), 2,605 votes; and Vilhjálmur Hjálmarsson (B), 2,315 votes.

===== 1963 =====
Results of the 1963 parliamentary election held on 9 June 1963:

Party		Votes	%	Seats		
Party		Votes	%	Con.	Com.	Tot.
Progressive Party	B	2,804	53.86%	3	0	3
Independence Party	D	1,104	21.21%	1	0	1
People's Alliance	G	905	17.38%	1	0	1
Social Democratic Party	A	250	4.80%	0	0	0
Independent	H	143	2.75%	0	0	0
Valid votes		5,206	100.00%	5	0	5
Blank votes		72	1.36%			
Rejected votes – other		18	0.34%			
Total polled		5,296	91.33%			
Registered electors		5,799				

The following candidates were elected: Eysteinn Jónsson (B), 2,803 votes; Halldór Ásgrímsson (B), 2,529 votes; Jónas Pétursson (D), 1,101 votes; Lúðvík Jósepsson (G), 905 votes; and Páll Þorsteinsson (B), 2,243 votes.

==== 1950s ====
===== October 1959 =====
Results of the October 1959 parliamentary election held on 25 and 26 October 1959:

Party		Votes	%	Seats		
Party		Votes	%	Con.	Com.	Tot.
Progressive Party	B	2,920	55.59%	3	0	3
Independence Party	D	1,129	21.49%	1	0	1
People's Alliance	G	989	18.83%	1	0	1
Social Democratic Party	A	215	4.09%	0	0	0
Valid votes		5,253	100.00%	5	0	5
Blank votes		57	1.07%			
Rejected votes – other		29	0.54%			
Total polled		5,339	91.92%			
Registered electors		5,808				

The following candidates were elected: Eysteinn Jónsson (B), 2,918 votes; Halldór Ásgrímsson (B), 2,627 votes; Jónas Pétursson (D), 1,119 votes; Lúðvík Jósepsson (G), 989 votes; and Páll Þorsteinsson (B), 2,335 votes.
