= Westfjords (Althing constituency) =

Former constituency of the Althing, the national legislature of Iceland

- Vestfirðir
- Former Constituency for the Althing
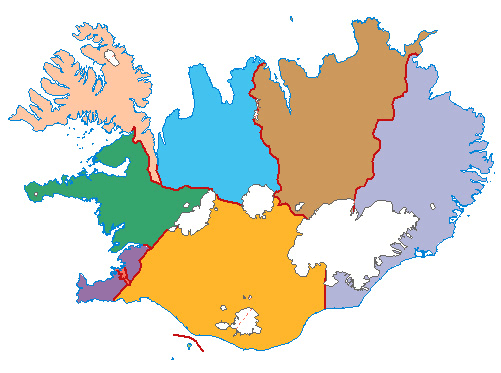
- Althing constituencies between 1959 and 2003
- Municipality: List: Árneshreppur; Bæjarhreppur; Bolungarvík; Broddaneshreppur; Hólmavíkurhreppur; Ísafjarðarbær; Kaldrananeshreppur; Kirkjubólshreppur; Reykhólahreppur; Súðavíkurhreppur; Tálknafjarðarhreppur; Vesturbyggð
- Region: Westfjords

Former Constituency
- Created: 1959
- Abolished: 2003
- Seats: List (Note: Excludes compensatory seats.): 4 (1987–2003); 5 (1959–1987)
- Created from: List: Barðastrandasýsla; Ísafjörður; North Ísafjarðarsýsla; Strandasýsla; West Ísafjarðarsýsla
- Replaced by: Northwest

Westfjords (Icelandic: Vestfirðir) was one of the multi-member constituencies of the Althing, the national legislature of Iceland. The constituency was established in 1959 following the nationwide extension of proportional representation for elections to the Althing. It was abolished in 2003 when the constituency was merged into the Northwestern constituency following the re-organisation of constituencies across Iceland. Westfjords was conterminous with the Westfjords region.

== Election results ==
=== Summary ===
Election	People's Alliance G			Left-Green U			Social Democrats S / A			Progressive B			Independence D		
Election	Votes	%	Seats	Votes	%	Seats	Votes	%	Seats	Votes	%	Seats	Votes	%	Seats
1999				268	5.53%	0	1,144	23.59%	1	1,124	23.18%	1	1,436	29.61%	1
1995	651	11.86%	0				752	13.70%	1	1,086	19.79%	1	1,787	32.56%	2
1991	619	10.92%	0				893	15.76%	1	1,582	27.92%	1	1,966	34.69%	2
1987	676	11.27%	0				1,145	19.10%	1	1,237	20.63%	1	1,742	29.05%	2
1983	723	13.14%	0				924	16.79%	1	1,510	27.43%	2	1,511	27.45%	2
1979	808	15.03%	0				1,188	22.10%	1	1,645	30.60%	2	1,735	32.27%	2
1978	937	17.67%	1				808	15.24%	1	1,114	21.01%	1	1,582	29.84%	2
1974	578	11.53%	0				495	9.87%	0	1,432	28.56%	2	1,798	35.86%	2
1971	277	5.56%	0				464	9.32%	0	1,510	30.33%	2	1,499	30.11%	2
1967	611	12.93%	0				704	14.89%	1	1,804	38.16%	2	1,608	34.02%	2
1963	744	15.21%	1				692	14.15%	0	1,743	35.63%	2	1,713	35.02%	2
1959 Oct	658	13.06%	0				680	13.49%	1	1,744	34.61%	2	1,957	38.84%	2

(Excludes compensatory seats.)

=== Detailed ===
==== 1990s ====
===== 1999 =====
Results of the 1999 parliamentary election held on 8 May 1999:

Party		Votes	%	Seats		
Party		Votes	%	Con.	Com.	Tot.
Independence Party	D	1,436	29.61%	1	1	2
Social Democratic Alliance	S	1,144	23.59%	1	0	1
Progressive Party	B	1,124	23.18%	1	0	1
Liberal Party	F	859	17.71%	1	0	1
Left-Green Movement	U	268	5.53%	0	0	0
Humanist Party	H	18	0.37%	0	0	0
Valid votes		4,849	100.00%	4	1	5
Blank votes		98	1.98%			
Rejected votes – other		4	0.08%			
Total polled		4,951	86.94%			
Registered electors		5,695				

The following candidates were elected: Einar Kristinn Guðfinnsson (D), 1,435 votes; Einar Oddur Kristjánsson (D), 1,422 votes; Guðjón Arnar Kristjánsson (F), 859 votes; Kristinn H. Gunnarsson (B), 1,118 votes; and Sighvatur Kristinn Björgvinsson (S), 1,120 votes.

===== 1995 =====
Results of the 1995 parliamentary election held on 8 April 1995:

Party		Votes	%	Seats		
Party		Votes	%	Con.	Com.	Tot.
Independence Party	D	1,787	32.56%	2	0	2
Progressive Party	B	1,086	19.79%	1	0	1
Social Democratic Party	A	752	13.70%	1	0	1
Westfjords List	M	717	13.06%	0	0	0
People's Alliance	G	651	11.86%	0	1	1
Women's List	V	312	5.68%	0	0	0
National Awakening	J	184	3.35%	0	0	0
Valid votes		5,489	100.00%	4	1	5
Blank votes		72	1.29%			
Rejected votes – other		19	0.34%			
Total polled		5,580	88.10%			
Registered electors		6,334				

The following candidates were elected: Einar Kristinn Guðfinnsson (D), 1,783 votes; Einar Oddur Kristjánsson (D), 1,784 votes; Gunnlaugur Sigmundsson (B), 1,083 votes; Kristinn H. Gunnarsson (G), 648 votes; and Sighvatur Kristinn Björgvinsson (A), 749 votes.

===== 1991 =====
Results of the 1991 parliamentary election held on 20 April 1991:

Party		Votes	%	Seats		
Party		Votes	%	Con.	Com.	Tot.
Independence Party	D	1,966	34.69%	2	0	2
Progressive Party	B	1,582	27.92%	1	0	1
Social Democratic Party	A	893	15.76%	1	0	1
People's Alliance	G	619	10.92%	0	1	1
Women's List	V	443	7.82%	0	1	1
National Party and Humanist Party	Þ	133	2.35%	0	0	0
Liberals	F	31	0.55%	0	0	0
Valid votes		5,667	100.00%	4	2	6
Blank votes		84	1.46%			
Rejected votes – other		18	0.31%			
Total polled		5,769	87.89%			
Registered electors		6,564				

The following candidates were elected: Einar Kristinn Guðfinnsson (D), 1,942 votes; Jóna Valgerður Kristjánsdóttir (V), 443 votes; Kristinn H. Gunnarsson (G), 617 votes; Matthías Bjarnasson (D), 1,938 votes; Ólafur Þ. Þórðarson (B), 1,562 votes; and Sighvatur Kristinn Björgvinsson (A), 890 votes.

==== 1980s ====
===== 1987 =====
Results of the 1987 parliamentary election held on 25 April 1987:

Party		Votes	%	Seats		
Party		Votes	%	Con.	Com.	Tot.
Independence Party	D	1,742	29.05%	2	0	2
Progressive Party	B	1,237	20.63%	1	0	1
Social Democratic Party	A	1,145	19.10%	1	1	2
People's Alliance	G	676	11.27%	0	0	0
National Party	Þ	663	11.06%	0	0	0
Women's List	V	318	5.30%	0	0	0
Citizens' Party	S	158	2.64%	0	0	0
Humanist Party	M	57	0.95%	0	0	0
Valid votes		5,996	100.00%	4	1	5
Blank votes		61	1.00%			
Rejected votes – other		57	0.93%			
Total polled		6,114	89.75%			
Registered electors		6,812				

The following candidates were elected: Karvel Pálmasson (A), 1,123 votes; Matthías Bjarnasson (D), 1,730 votes; Ólafur Þ. Þórðarson (B), 1,209 votes; Sighvatur Kristinn Björgvinsson (A), 1,139 votes; and Þorvaldur Garðar Kristjánsson (D), 1,732 votes.

===== 1983 =====
Results of the 1983 parliamentary election held on 23 April 1983:

Party		Votes	%	Seats		
Party		Votes	%	Con.	Com.	Tot.
Independence Party	D	1,511	27.45%	2	0	2
Progressive Party	B	1,510	27.43%	2	0	2
Social Democratic Party	A	924	16.79%	1	0	1
People's Alliance	G	723	13.14%	0	0	0
Independent	T	639	11.61%	0	0	0
Alliance of Social Democrats	C	197	3.58%	0	0	0
Valid votes		5,504	100.00%	5	0	5
Blank votes		103	1.82%			
Rejected votes – other		46	0.81%			
Total polled		5,653	88.30%			
Registered electors		6,402				

The following candidates were elected: Karvel Pálmasson (A), 913 votes; Matthías Bjarnasson (D), 1,509 votes; Ólafur Þ. Þórðarson (B), 1,358 votes; Steingrímur Hermannsson (B), 1,509 votes; and Þorvaldur Garðar Kristjánsson (D), 1,359 votes.

==== 1970s ====
===== 1979 =====
Results of the 1979 parliamentary election held on 2 and 3 December 1979:

Party		Votes	%	Seats		
Party		Votes	%	Con.	Com.	Tot.
Independence Party	D	1,735	32.27%	2	0	2
Progressive Party	B	1,645	30.60%	2	0	2
Social Democratic Party	A	1,188	22.10%	1	1	2
People's Alliance	G	808	15.03%	0	0	0
Valid votes		5,376	100.00%	5	1	6
Blank votes		90	1.64%			
Rejected votes – other		22	0.40%			
Total polled		5,488	89.24%			
Registered electors		6,150				

The following candidates were elected: Karvel Pálmasson (A), 1,069 votes; Matthías Bjarnasson (D), 1,733 votes; Ólafur Þ. Þórðarson (B), 1,479 votes; Sighvatur Kristinn Björgvinsson (A), 1,187 votes; Steingrímur Hermannsson (B), 1,645 votes; and Þorvaldur Garðar Kristjánsson (D), 1,557 votes.

===== 1978 =====
Results of the 1978 parliamentary election held on 25 June 1978:

Party		Votes	%	Seats		
Party		Votes	%	Con.	Com.	Tot.
Independence Party	D	1,582	29.84%	2	0	2
Progressive Party	B	1,114	21.01%	1	0	1
People's Alliance	G	937	17.67%	1	0	1
Social Democratic Party	A	808	15.24%	1	0	1
Independent Voters	H	776	14.64%	0	0	0
Union of Liberals and Leftists	F	85	1.60%	0	0	0
Valid votes		5,302	100.00%	5	0	5
Blank votes		96	1.77%			
Rejected votes – other		13	0.24%			
Total polled		5,411	90.90%			
Registered electors		5,953				

The following candidates were elected: Kjartan Ólafsson (G), 937 votes; Matthías Bjarnasson (D), 1,579 votes; Sighvatur Kristinn Björgvinsson (A), 808 votes; Steingrímur Hermannsson (B), 1,113 votes; and Þorvaldur Garðar Kristjánsson (D), 1,416 votes.

===== 1974 =====
Results of the 1974 parliamentary election held on 30 June 1974:

Party		Votes	%	Seats		
Party		Votes	%	Con.	Com.	Tot.
Independence Party	D	1,798	35.86%	2	1	3
Progressive Party	B	1,432	28.56%	2	0	2
Union of Liberals and Leftists	F	711	14.18%	1	0	1
People's Alliance	G	578	11.53%	0	0	0
Social Democratic Party	A	495	9.87%	0	1	1
Valid votes		5,014	100.00%	5	2	7
Blank votes		64	1.26%			
Rejected votes – other		18	0.35%			
Total polled		5,096	91.07%			
Registered electors		5,596				

The following candidates were elected: Gunnlaugur Finnsson (B), 1,292 votes; Karvel Pálmason (F), 711 votes; Matthías Bjarnasson (D), 1,796 votes; Sighvatur Kristinn Björgvinsson (A), 495 votes; Sigurlaug Bjarnadóttir (D), 599 votes; Steingrímur Hermannsson (B), 1,431 votes; and Þorvaldur Garðar Kristjánsson (D), 1,623 votes.

===== 1971 =====
Results of the 1971 parliamentary election held on 13 June 1971:

Party		Votes	%	Seats		
Party		Votes	%	Con.	Com.	Tot.
Progressive Party	B	1,510	30.33%	2	0	2
Independence Party	D	1,499	30.11%	2	0	2
Union of Liberals and Leftists	F	1,229	24.68%	1	1	2
Social Democratic Party	A	464	9.32%	0	0	0
People's Alliance	G	277	5.56%	0	0	0
Valid votes		4,979	100.00%	5	1	6
Blank votes		56	1.11%			
Rejected votes – other		22	0.44%			
Total polled		5,057	90.53%			
Registered electors		5,586				

The following candidates were elected: Bjarni Guðbjörnsson (B), 1,333 votes; Hannibal Valdimarsson (F), 1,229 votes; Karvel Pálmason (F), 615 votes; Matthías Bjarnasson (D), 1,493 votes; Steingrímur Hermannsson (B), 1,508 votes; and Þorvaldur Garðar Kristjánsson (D), 1,342 votes.

==== 1960s ====
===== 1967 =====
Results of the 1967 parliamentary election held on 11 June 1967:

Party		Votes	%	Seats		
Party		Votes	%	Con.	Com.	Tot.
Progressive Party	B	1,804	38.16%	2	0	2
Independence Party	D	1,608	34.02%	2	0	2
Social Democratic Party	A	704	14.89%	1	0	1
People's Alliance	G	611	12.93%	0	1	1
Valid votes		4,727	100.00%	5	1	6
Blank votes		110	2.27%			
Rejected votes – other		16	0.33%			
Total polled		4,853	90.09%			
Registered electors		5,387				

The following candidates were elected: Birgir Finnsson (A), 704 votes; Bjarni Guðbjörnsson (B), 1,621 votes; Matthías Bjarnasson (D), 1,435 votes; Sigurður Bjarnason (D), 1,604 votes; Sigurvin Einarsson (B), 1,794 votes; and Steingrímur Pálsson (G), 611 votes.

===== 1963 =====
Results of the 1963 parliamentary election held on 9 June 1963:

Party		Votes	%	Seats		
Party		Votes	%	Con.	Com.	Tot.
Progressive Party	B	1,743	35.63%	2	0	2
Independence Party	D	1,713	35.02%	2	1	3
People's Alliance	G	744	15.21%	1	0	1
Social Democratic Party	A	692	14.15%	0	1	1
Valid votes		4,892	100.00%	5	2	7
Blank votes		93	1.85%			
Rejected votes – other		51	1.01%			
Total polled		5,036	90.90%			
Registered electors		5,540				

The following candidates were elected: Birgir Finnsson (A), 692 votes; Hannibal Valdimarsson (G), 744 votes; Hermann Jónasson (B), 1,742 votes; Matthías Bjarnasson (D), 571 votes; Sigurður Bjarnason (D), 1,701 votes; Sigurvin Einarsson (B), 1,567 votes; and Þorvaldur Garðar Kristjánsson (D), 1,520 votes.

==== 1950s ====
===== October 1959 =====
Results of the October 1959 parliamentary election held on 25 and 26 October 1959:

Party		Votes	%	Seats		
Party		Votes	%	Con.	Com.	Tot.
Independence Party	D	1,957	38.84%	2	0	2
Progressive Party	B	1,744	34.61%	2	0	2
Social Democratic Party	A	680	13.49%	1	0	1
People's Alliance	G	658	13.06%	0	1	1
Valid votes		5,039	100.00%	5	1	6
Blank votes		69	1.34%			
Rejected votes – other		28	0.55%			
Total polled		5,136	89.95%			
Registered electors		5,710				

The following candidates were elected: Birgir Finnsson (A), 678 votes; Gísli Jónsson (D), 1,948 votes; Hannibal Valdimarsson (G), 658 votes; Hermann Jónasson (B), 1,741 votes; Kjartan J. Jóhannsson (D), 1,754 votes; and Sigurvin Einarsson (B), 1,566 votes.
