= Northwestern (Althing constituency) =

Former constituency of the Althing, the national legislature of Iceland

- Norðurland vestra
- Former Constituency for the Althing
- Althing constituencies between 1959 and 2003
- Municipality: List: Akrahreppur; Áshreppur; Blönduóssbær; Bólstaðarhlíðarhreppur; Engihlíðarhreppur; Höfðahreppur; Húnaþing vestra; Siglufjörður; Skagahreppur; Sveinsstaðahreppur; Sveitarfélagið Skagafjörður; Svínavatnshreppur; Torfalækjarhreppur; Vindhælishreppur
- Region: Northwestern

Former Constituency
- Created: 1959
- Abolished: 2003
- Seats: List (Note: Excludes compensatory seats.): 4 (1987–2003); 5 (1959–1987)
- Created from: List: East Húnavatnssýsla; Siglufjörður; Skagafjarðarsýsla; West Húnavatnssýsla
- Replaced by: List: Northeast; Northwest

Northwestern (Icelandic: Norðurland vestra) was one of the multi-member constituencies of the Althing, the national legislature of Iceland. The constituency was established in 1959 following the nationwide extension of proportional representation for elections to the Althing. It was abolished in 2003 following the re-organisation of constituencies across Iceland when all municipalities in the constituency except Siglufjörður were merged with the Western and Westfjords constituencies to form the Northwest constituency. Siglufjörður was merged into the Northeast constituency. Northwestern was conterminous with the Northwestern region.

== Election results ==
=== Summary ===
Election	People's Alliance G			Left-Green U			Social Democrats S / A			Progressive B			Independence D		
Election	Votes	%	Seats	Votes	%	Seats	Votes	%	Seats	Votes	%	Seats	Votes	%	Seats
1999				561	9.41%	0	1,481	24.84%	1	1,808	30.33%	1	1,904	31.94%	2
1995	987	15.56%	1				318	5.01%	0	2,454	38.69%	2	1,951	30.76%	1
1991	1,220	19.24%	1				739	11.65%	0	2,045	32.25%	2	1,783	28.12%	1
1987	1,016	15.74%	1				656	10.17%	0	2,270	35.18%	2	1,367	21.18%	1
1983	1,028	18.03%	1				411	7.21%	0	1,641	28.78%	2	1,786	31.32%	2
1979	984	17.24%	1				611	10.71%	0	2,506	43.91%	3	1,606	28.14%	1
1978	1,189	21.52%	1				752	13.61%	0	1,784	32.29%	2	1,522	27.55%	2
1974	851	15.79%	1				445	8.25%	0	2,027	37.60%	2	1,756	32.57%	2
1971	897	17.42%	1				566	10.99%	0	2,006	38.97%	2	1,679	32.61%	2
1967	637	12.73%	0				652	13.03%	0	2,010	40.16%	3	1,706	34.09%	2
1963	663	13.00%	0				537	10.53%	0	2,135	41.86%	3	1,765	34.61%	2
1959 Oct	616	11.94%	0				495	9.60%	0	2,146	41.61%	3	1,900	36.84%	2

(Excludes compensatory seats.)

=== Detailed ===
==== 1990s ====
===== 1999 =====
Results of the 1999 parliamentary election held on 8 May 1999:

Party		Votes	%	Seats		
Party		Votes	%	Con.	Com.	Tot.
Independence Party	D	1,904	31.94%	2	0	2
Progressive Party	B	1,808	30.33%	1	0	1
Social Democratic Alliance	S	1,481	24.84%	1	0	1
Left-Green Movement	U	561	9.41%	0	1	1
Liberal Party	F	195	3.27%	0	0	0
Humanist Party	H	13	0.22%	0	0	0
Valid votes		5,962	100.00%	4	1	5
Blank votes		111	1.83%			
Rejected votes – other		5	0.08%			
Total polled		6,078	88.87%			
Registered electors		6,839				

The following candidates were elected:

- Constituency seats - Hjálmar Jónsson (D), 1,875 votes; Kristján L. Möller (S), 1,452 votes; Páll Bragi Pétursson (B), 1,802 votes; and Vilhjálmur Egilsson (D), 1,893 votes.
- Compensatory seats - Jón Bjarnason (U), 560 votes.

===== 1995 =====
Results of the 1995 parliamentary election held on 8 April 1995:

Party		Votes	%	Seats		
Party		Votes	%	Con.	Com.	Tot.
Progressive Party	B	2,454	38.69%	2	0	2
Independence Party	D	1,951	30.76%	1	1	2
People's Alliance	G	987	15.56%	1	0	1
National Awakening	J	429	6.76%	0	0	0
Social Democratic Party	A	318	5.01%	0	0	0
Women's List	V	204	3.22%	0	0	0
Valid votes		6,343	100.00%	4	1	5
Blank votes		93	1.44%			
Rejected votes – other		11	0.17%			
Total polled		6,447	89.58%			
Registered electors		7,197				

The following candidates were elected:

- Constituency seats - Hjálmar Jónsson (D), 1,892 votes; Páll Bragi Pétursson (B), 2,427 votes; Ragnar Arnalds (G), 984 votes; and Stefán Sigurður Guðmundsson (B), 2,438 votes.
- Compensatory seats - Vilhjálmur Egilsson (D), 1,913 votes.

===== 1991 =====
Results of the 1991 parliamentary election held on 20 April 1991:

Party		Votes	%	Seats		
Party		Votes	%	Con.	Com.	Tot.
Progressive Party	B	2,045	32.25%	2	0	2
Independence Party	D	1,783	28.12%	1	1	2
People's Alliance	G	1,220	19.24%	1	0	1
Social Democratic Party	A	739	11.65%	0	0	0
Women's List	V	327	5.16%	0	0	0
Home Rule Association	H	105	1.66%	0	0	0
National Party and Humanist Party	Þ	97	1.53%	0	0	0
Liberals	F	25	0.39%	0	0	0
Valid votes		6,341	100.00%	4	1	5
Blank votes		98	1.52%			
Rejected votes – other		12	0.19%			
Total polled		6,451	89.72%			
Registered electors		7,190				

The following candidates were elected:

- Constituency seats - Páll Bragi Pétursson (B), 2,019 votes; Pálmi Jónsson (D), 1,756 votes; Ragnar Arnalds (G), 1,218 votes; and Stefán Sigurður Guðmundsson (B), 2,034 votes.
- Compensatory seats - Vilhjálmur Egilsson (D), 1,714 votes.

==== 1980s ====
===== 1987 =====
Results of the 1987 parliamentary election held on 25 April 1987:

Party		Votes	%	Seats		
Party		Votes	%	Con.	Com.	Tot.
Progressive Party	B	2,270	35.18%	2	0	2
Independence Party	D	1,367	21.18%	1	0	1
People's Alliance	G	1,016	15.74%	1	0	1
Social Democratic Party	A	656	10.17%	0	1	1
Citizens' Party	S	471	7.30%	0	0	0
Women's List	V	337	5.22%	0	0	0
National Party	Þ	288	4.46%	0	0	0
Humanist Party	M	48	0.74%	0	0	0
Valid votes		6,453	100.00%	4	1	5
Blank votes		60	0.92%			
Rejected votes – other		14	0.21%			
Total polled		6,527	89.50%			
Registered electors		7,293				

The following candidates were elected:

- Constituency seats - Páll Bragi Pétursson (B), 2,246 votes; Pálmi Jónsson (D), 1,363 votes; Ragnar Arnalds (G), 1,014 votes; and Stefán Sigurður Guðmundsson (B), 2,250 votes.
- Compensatory seats - Jón Sæmundur Sigurjónsson (A), 656 votes.

===== 1983 =====
Results of the 1983 parliamentary election held on 23 April 1983:

Party		Votes	%	Seats		
Party		Votes	%	Con.	Com.	Tot.
Independence Party	D	1,786	31.32%	2	0	2
Progressive Party	B	1,641	28.78%	2	0	2
People's Alliance	G	1,028	18.03%	1	0	1
Progressive Party (2nd list)	BB	659	11.56%	0	0	0
Social Democratic Party	A	411	7.21%	0	0	0
Alliance of Social Democrats	C	177	3.10%	0	0	0
Valid votes		5,702	100.00%	5	0	5
Blank votes		168	2.85%			
Rejected votes – other		17	0.29%			
Total polled		5,887	87.40%			
Registered electors		6,736				

The following candidates were elected:

- Constituency seats - Eyjólfur Konráð Jónsson (D), 1,602 votes; Páll Bragi Pétursson (B), 1,622 votes; Pálmi Jónsson (D), 1,773 votes; Ragnar Arnalds (G), 1,028 votes; and Stefán Sigurður Guðmundsson (B), 1,478 votes.

==== 1970s ====
===== 1979 =====
Results of the 1979 parliamentary election held on 2 and 3 December 1979:

Party		Votes	%	Seats		
Party		Votes	%	Con.	Com.	Tot.
Progressive Party	B	2,506	43.91%	3	0	3
Independence Party	D	1,606	28.14%	1	1	2
People's Alliance	G	984	17.24%	1	0	1
Social Democratic Party	A	611	10.71%	0	0	0
Valid votes		5,707	100.00%	5	1	6
Blank votes		143	2.44%			
Rejected votes – other		13	0.22%			
Total polled		5,863	89.38%			
Registered electors		6,560				

The following candidates were elected:

- Constituency seats - Ingólfur Guðnasson (B), 2,007 votes; Páll Bragi Pétursson (B), 2,492 votes; Pálmi Jónsson (D), 1,605 votes; Ragnar Arnalds (G), 984 votes; and Stefán Sigurður Guðmundsson (B), 2,255 votes.
- Compensatory seats - Eyjólfur Konráð Jónsson (D), 803 votes.

===== 1978 =====
Results of the 1978 parliamentary election held on 25 June 1978:

Party		Votes	%	Seats		
Party		Votes	%	Con.	Com.	Tot.
Progressive Party	B	1,784	32.29%	2	0	2
Independence Party	D	1,522	27.55%	2	0	2
People's Alliance	G	1,189	21.52%	1	0	1
Social Democratic Party	A	752	13.61%	0	1	1
Union of Liberals and Leftists	F	278	5.03%	0	0	0
Valid votes		5,525	100.00%	5	1	6
Blank votes		90	1.60%			
Rejected votes – other		17	0.30%			
Total polled		5,632	88.79%			
Registered electors		6,343				

The following candidates were elected:

- Constituency seats - Eyjólfur Konráð Jónsson (D), 1,359 votes; Ólafur Jóhannesson (B), 1,783 votes; Páll Bragi Pétursson (B), 1,602 votes; Pálmi Jónsson (D), 1,518 votes; and Ragnar Arnalds (G), 1,189 votes.
- Compensatory seats - Finnur Torfi Stefánsson (A), 752 votes.

===== 1974 =====
Results of the 1974 parliamentary election held on 30 June 1974:

Party		Votes	%	Seats		
Party		Votes	%	Con.	Com.	Tot.
Progressive Party	B	2,027	37.60%	2	0	2
Independence Party	D	1,756	32.57%	2	0	2
People's Alliance	G	851	15.79%	1	0	1
Social Democratic Party	A	445	8.25%	0	0	0
Union of Liberals and Leftists	F	312	5.79%	0	0	0
Valid votes		5,391	100.00%	5	0	5
Blank votes		57	1.04%			
Rejected votes – other		8	0.15%			
Total polled		5,456	90.59%			
Registered electors		6,023				

The following candidates were elected:

- Constituency seats - Eyjólfur Konráð Jónsson (D), 1,549 votes; Ólafur Jóhannesson (B), 2,027 votes; Páll Bragi Pétursson (B), 1,812 votes; Pálmi Jónsson (D), 1,753 votes; and Ragnar Arnalds (G), 851 votes.

===== 1971 =====
Results of the 1971 parliamentary election held on 13 June 1971:

Party		Votes	%	Seats		
Party		Votes	%	Con.	Com.	Tot.
Progressive Party	B	2,006	38.97%	2	0	2
Independence Party	D	1,679	32.61%	2	0	2
People's Alliance	G	897	17.42%	1	0	1
Social Democratic Party	A	566	10.99%	0	1	1
Valid votes		5,148	100.00%	5	1	6
Blank votes		86	1.64%			
Rejected votes – other		20	0.38%			
Total polled		5,254	89.77%			
Registered electors		5,853				

The following candidates were elected:

- Constituency seats - Björn Pálsson (B), 1,795 votes; Gunnar Gíslason (D), 1,673 votes; Ólafur Jóhannesson (B), 2,005 votes; Pálmi Jónsson (D), 1,509 votes; and Ragnar Arnalds (G), 895 votes.
- Compensatory seats - Pétur Pétursson (A), 566 votes.

==== 1960s ====
===== 1967 =====
Results of the 1967 parliamentary election held on 11 June 1967:

Party		Votes	%	Seats		
Party		Votes	%	Con.	Com.	Tot.
Progressive Party	B	2,010	40.16%	3	0	3
Independence Party	D	1,706	34.09%	2	0	2
Social Democratic Party	A	652	13.03%	0	1	1
People's Alliance	G	637	12.73%	0	0	0
Valid votes		5,005	100.00%	5	1	6
Blank votes		95	1.85%			
Rejected votes – other		33	0.64%			
Total polled		5,133	91.04%			
Registered electors		5,638				

The following candidates were elected:

- Constituency seats - Björn Pálsson (B), 1,601 votes; Gunnar Gíslason (D), 1,703 votes; Ólafur Jóhannesson (B), 1,806 votes; Pálmi Jónsson (D), 1,531 votes; and Skúli Guðmundsson (B), 2,007 votes.
- Compensatory seats - Jón Þorsteinsson (A), 652 votes.

===== 1963 =====
Results of the 1963 parliamentary election held on 9 June 1963:

Party		Votes	%	Seats		
Party		Votes	%	Con.	Com.	Tot.
Progressive Party	B	2,135	41.86%	3	0	3
Independence Party	D	1,765	34.61%	2	0	2
People's Alliance	G	663	13.00%	0	1	1
Social Democratic Party	A	537	10.53%	0	1	1
Valid votes		5,100	100.00%	5	2	7
Blank votes		82	1.58%			
Rejected votes – other		7	0.13%			
Total polled		5,189	89.95%			
Registered electors		5,769				

The following candidates were elected:

- Constituency seats - Björn Pálsson (B), 1,668 votes; Einar Ingimundarson (D), 1,589 votes; Gunnar Gíslason (D), 1,765 votes; Ólafur Jóhannesson (B), 1,921 votes; and Skúli Guðmundsson (B), 2,133 votes.
- Compensatory seats - Jón Þorsteinsson (A), 537 votes; and Ragnar Arnalds (G), 663 votes; .

==== 1950s ====
===== October 1959 =====
Results of the October 1959 parliamentary election held on 25 and 26 October 1959:

Party		Votes	%	Seats		
Party		Votes	%	Con.	Com.	Tot.
Progressive Party	B	2,146	41.61%	3	0	3
Independence Party	D	1,900	36.84%	2	0	2
People's Alliance	G	616	11.94%	0	1	1
Social Democratic Party	A	495	9.60%	0	1	1
Valid votes		5,157	100.00%	5	2	7
Blank votes		89	1.69%			
Rejected votes – other		20	0.38%			
Total polled		5,266	90.86%			
Registered electors		5,796				

The following candidates were elected:

- Constituency seats - Björn Pálsson (B), 1,716 votes; Einar Ingimundarson (D), 1,707 votes; Gunnar Gíslason (D), 1,897 votes; Ólafur Jóhannesson (B), 1,931 votes; and Skúli Guðmundsson (B), 2,145 votes.
- Compensatory seats - Gunnar jóhannsson (G), 616 votes; and Jón Þorsteinsson (A), 495 votes.
