= Frjáls þjóð =

Icelandic newspaper

The Frjáls þjóð (Icelandic: Free Nation) was a weekly newspaper published in Reykjavík, Iceland from 1952 to 1967. Its policy was to protest against increasing American influence in Icelandic daily life. It was opposed to Icelandic membership of NATO and to American bases on Icelandic soil in peacetime. It protested that American soldiers could wander around Iceland without being monitored, and also protested that American base television programs were visible to the Icelandic general public. It also criticised the United People's Socialist Party (Sameiningarflokkur alþýðu, sósíalistaflokkurinn) for being to loyal to the Soviet Union. The newspaper also fought against what it saw as corruption in Icelandic society and possible Icelandic membership of the European Community. In 1967, the newspaper supported Hannibal Valdimarsson, the chairman of the electoral alliance People's Alliance, in his campaign for a seat in Parliament as an independent.

The editors and owners of Frjáls þjóð supported the National Preservation Party which was founded in March 1953. Amongst the editors of this newspaper was one, Bergur Sigurbjörnsson, who was Member of Parliament for the National Preservation Party 1953–1956, editor from the beginning in 1952 to 1954 and also in 1967. Two later editors/owners who became members of parliament were Ragnar Arnalds in 1960 and Jón Baldvin Hannibalsson 1964–1967.
