= June 1959 Icelandic parliamentary election =

← 1956	28 June 1959	October 1959 →
- All 35 seats in the Lower House and 17 seats in the Upper House of Althing
- Turnout: 90.63%
Party	Leader	Vote %	Seats	+/–
Upper House
Independence	Ólafur Thors	42.49	7	+1
Progressive	Hermann Jónasson	27.20	6	0
People's Alliance	Hannibal Valdimarsson	15.25	2	−1
Social Democratic	Emil Jónsson	12.54	2	0
Lower House
Independence	Ólafur Thors	42.49	13	0
Progressive	Hermann Jónasson	27.20	13	+2
People's Alliance	Hannibal Valdimarsson	15.25	5	0
Social Democratic	Emil Jónsson	12.54	4	−2
This lists parties that won seats. See the complete results below.
Prime Minister before	Prime Minister after
Emil Jónsson; Social Democratic	Emil Jónsson; Social Democratic

Parliamentary elections were held in Iceland on 28 June 1959. The Independence Party and the Progressive Party both won 13 seats in the Lower House of the Althing. Following the tie, electoral reforms were introduced and early elections were held in October.

== Electoral system ==
The elections were conducted under rural–urban proportional representation. Twenty-one members were elected in single-member constituencies via first-past-the-post voting, while the remainder were elected using D'Hondt method proportional representation: twelve members in two-member constituencies, eight members in Reykjavík, and eleven from a single national compensatory list. To earn national list seats, a party had to win at least one constituency seat. In constituencies electing two or more members, within the party list, voters had the option to re-rank the candidates and could also strike a candidate out. Allocation of seats to candidates was done using a system based on the Borda count.

== Results ==
Party	Votes	%	Seats			
Party	Votes	%	Lower House	+/–	Upper House	+/–
Independence Party	36,029	42.49	13	0	7	+1
Progressive Party	23,061	27.20	13	+2	6	0
People's Alliance	12,929	15.25	5	0	2	–1
Social Democratic Party	10,632	12.54	4	–2	2	0
National Preservation Party	2,137	2.52	0	0	0	0
Total	84,788	100.00	35	0	17	0
Valid votes	84,788	98.42				
Invalid/blank votes	1,359	1.58				
Total votes	86,147	100.00				
Registered voters/turnout	95,050	90.63				
Source: Nohlen & Stöver
