= 1956 Icelandic parliamentary election =

← 1953	24 June 1956	June 1959 →
- All 35 seats in the Lower House and 17 seats in the Upper House of Althing
- Turnout: 92.07%
Party	Leader	Vote %	Seats	+/–
Upper House
Independence	Ólafur Thors	42.37	6	−1
People's Alliance	Hannibal Valdimarsson	19.18	3	New
Social Democratic	Haraldur Guðmundsson	18.33	2	0
Progressive	Hermann Jónasson	15.63	6	0
Lower House
Independence	Ólafur Thors	42.37	13	−1
People's Alliance	Hannibal Valdimarsson	19.18	5	New
Social Democratic	Haraldur Guðmundsson	18.33	6	+2
Progressive	Hermann Jónasson	15.63	11	+1
This lists parties that won seats. See the complete results below.
Prime Minister before	Prime Minister after
Ólafur Thors; Independence	Hermann Jónasson; Progressive

Parliamentary elections were held in Iceland on 24 June 1956. The Independence Party remained the largest party in the Lower House of the Althing, winning 13 of the 35 seats.

== Electoral system ==
The elections were conducted under rural–urban proportional representation. Twenty-one members were elected in single-member constituencies via first-past-the-post voting, while the remainder were elected using D'Hondt method proportional representation: twelve members in two-member constituencies, eight members in Reykjavík, and eleven from a single national compensatory list. To earn national list seats, a party had to win at least one constituency seat. In constituencies electing two or more members, within the party list, voters had the option to re-rank the candidates and could also strike a candidate out. Allocation of seats to candidates was done using a system based on the Borda count.

== Results ==
Party	Votes	%	Seats			
Party	Votes	%	Lower House	+/–	Upper House	+/–
Independence Party	35,027	42.37	13	–1	6	–1
People's Alliance	15,859	19.18	5	0	3	+1
Social Democratic Party	15,153	18.33	6	+2	2	0
Progressive Party	12,925	15.63	11	+1	6	0
National Preservation Party	3,706	4.48	0	–2	0	0
Independents	8	0.01	0	New	0	New
Total	82,678	100.00	35	0	17	0
Valid votes	82,678	98.01				
Invalid/blank votes	1,677	1.99				
Total votes	84,355	100.00				
Registered voters/turnout	91,618	92.07				
Source: Nohlen & Stöver
