= National Preservation Party =

Defunct political party in Iceland

National Preservation Party Þjóðvarnarflokkurinn
- Founders: Gils Guðmundsson; Bergur Sigurbjörnsson
- Founded: 15 March 1953
- Dissolved: 1968
- Succeeded by: Union of Liberals and Leftists (partly)
- Ideology: Social democracy Social liberalism Neutrality
- Political position: Centre-left
- National affiliation: People's Alliance (since 1963)

National Preservation Party (Icelandic: Þjóðvarnarflokkurinn) was a political party in Iceland.

== History ==
The party was founded on 15 March 1953 by members of the Progressive Party, Social Democratic Party and Socialist Party. It won two seats in the June 1953 elections, taken by Gils Guðmundsson and Bergur Sigurbjörnsson. Party members also gained seats on the student council of the University of Iceland, Akureyri local council and Reykjavík city council.

However, it lost both Althing seats in the 1956 elections. It failed to win a seat in the June and October elections in 1959, and thereafter only contested elections as part of the People's Alliance. Guðmundsson gained a seat, which he held until 1979. Sigurbjörnsson did not succeed in winning back his seat, but served twice in the Althing during the 1963–1967 term, replacing other MPs.

In 1969, some party members left the People's Alliance to establish the Union of Liberals and Leftists.

== Ideology ==
The party's main policy was a neutral foreign policy. It opposed Icelandic membership of NATO and the presence of American military bases in the country. Domestically, it had a liberal, social-democratic platform, supporting a mixed economy with both private and public participation.

== Election results ==
| Election | Votes | % | Seats | Place |
|---|---|---|---|---|
| 1953 | 4,667 | 6.0 | 2 | 5th |
| 1956 | 3,706 ▼ | 4.5 ▼ | 0 ▼ | 5th |
| June 1959 | 2,137 ▼ | 2.5 ▼ | 0 | 5th |
| October 1959 | 2,883 ▲ | 3.4 ▲ | 0 | 5th |
