= 1983 Icelandic parliamentary election =

← 1979	23 April 1983	1987 →
- All 40 seats in the Lower House and 20 seats in the Upper House of Althing
- Turnout: 88.29%
Party	Leader	Vote %	Seats	+/–
Upper House
Independence	Geir Hallgrímsson	38.67	8	+1
Progressive	Steingrímur Hermannsson	19.05	4	−2
People's Alliance	Svavar Gestsson	17.31	3	−1
Social Democratic	Kjartan Jóhannsson	11.71	2	−1
Social Democrats	Vilmundur Gylfason	7.30	2	New
Women's List		5.48	1	New
Lower House
Independence	Geir Hallgrímsson	38.67	15	+1
Progressive	Steingrímur Hermannsson	19.05	10	−1
People's Alliance	Svavar Gestsson	17.31	7	0
Social Democratic	Kjartan Jóhannsson	11.71	4	−3
Social Democrats	Vilmundur Gylfason	7.30	2	New
Women's List		5.48	2	New
This lists parties that won seats. See the complete results below.
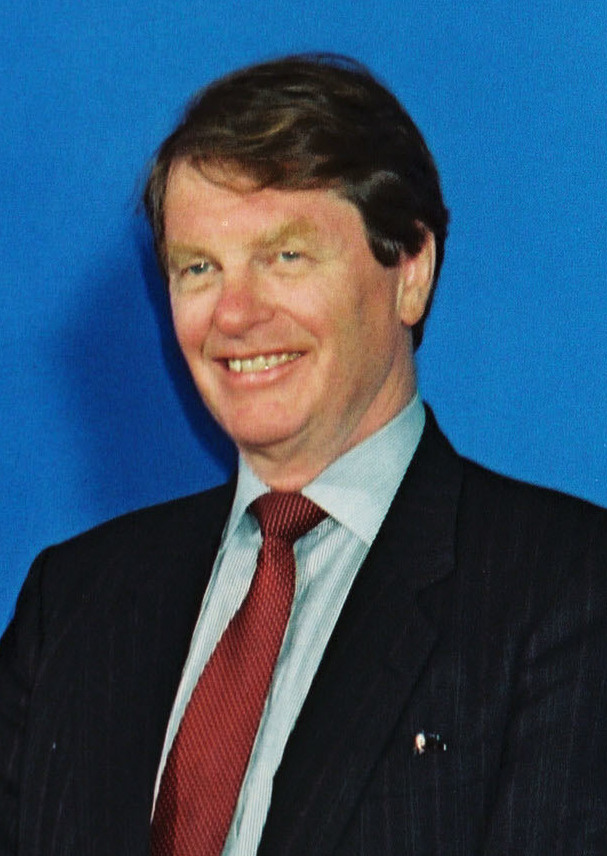
Prime Minister before	Prime Minister after
Gunnar Thoroddsen; Independence	Steingrímur Hermannsson; Progressive

Parliamentary elections were held in Iceland on 23 April 1983. The Independence Party remained the largest party in the Lower House of the Althing, winning 15 of the 40 seats.

== Results ==
Party	Votes	%	Seats			
Party	Votes	%	Lower House	+/–	Upper House	+/–
Independence Party	50,251	38.67	15	+1	8	+1
Progressive Party	24,754	19.05	10	–1	4	–2
People's Alliance	22,490	17.31	7	0	3	–1
Social Democratic Party	15,214	11.71	4	–3	2	–1
Alliance of Social Democrats	9,489	7.30	2	New	2	New
Women's List	7,125	5.48	2	New	1	New
Independent Voters in the West Fjords (Note: Breakaway from the Independence Party)	639	0.49	0	New	0	New
Total	129,962	100.00	40	0	20	0
Valid votes	129,962	97.49				
Invalid/blank votes	3,342	2.51				
Total votes	133,304	100.00				
Registered voters/turnout	150,977	88.29				
Source: Nohlen & Stöver

=== By constituency ===
Constituency	People's Alliance	Social Democratic	Alliance of Social Democrats	Progressive	Independence	Other
Eastern	29.85%	3.98%	3.81%	37.90%	24.46%	0.00%
Northeastern	16.84%	10.97%	4.55%	34.67%	27.20%	5.77%
Northwestern	18.03%	7.21%	3.10%	40.34%	31.32%	0.00%
Reykjanes	13.77%	14.83%	8.11%	11.91%	44.18%	7.21%
Reykjavík	18.98%	10.78%	9.49%	9.42%	42.97%	8.37%
Southern	14.53%	12.15%	5.40%	27.98%	39.94%	0.00%
Westfjords	13.14%	16.79%	3.58%	27.43%	27.45%	11.61%
Western	15.21%	13.50%	6.34%	30.21%	34.74%	0.00%
Source: Constituency Level Election Archive
