= Finnbogi Hermannsson =

Icelandic writer and politician

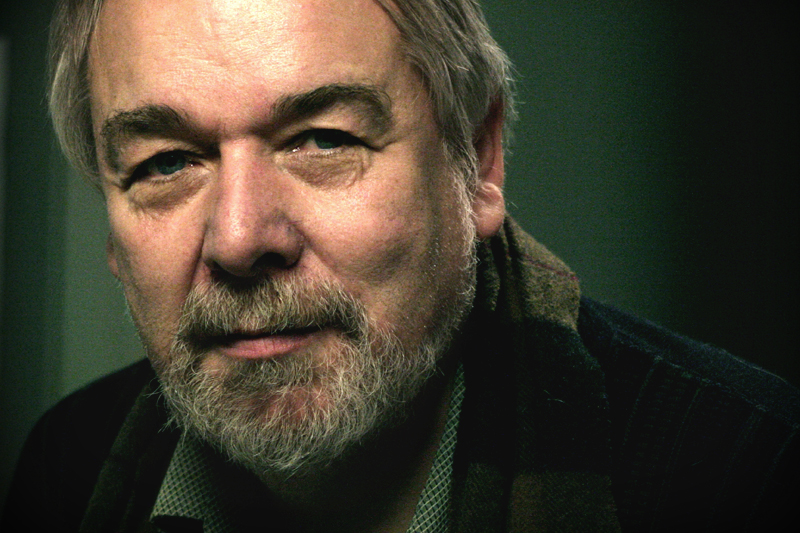

Personal details
- Born: 20 September 1945 (age 79); Reykjavík, Iceland
- Political party: Progressive Party

Finnbogi Hermannsson (born 20 September 1945) is an Icelandic writer, reporter and politician. He was a member of Alþingi for the Progressive Party in 1980. He worked as a reporter for RÚV for several decades.
