= Heimssýn =

Organisation of Icelandic Eurosceptics

- Formation: June 27, 2002; 24 years ago
- Type: Non-governmental organization
- Purpose: Political (euroscepticism)
- Headquarters: Reykjavík, Iceland
- Members: c. 3,500
- Official language: Icelandic (de facto)
- Chairman: Haraldur Ólafsson
- Website: Heimssyn.is

Heimssýn (English: World View) is an organisation of Icelandic Eurosceptics who actively campaign against Iceland becoming of a member of the European Union founded in June 2002. It was founded in June 2002. Ragnar Arnalds, former MP and Minister of Finance, served as chairman of the organisation from its foundation until 2009. The current chairman is Jón Bjarnason, former Member of the Althing and Minister of Agriculture, and the vice-chairman is Jóhanna María Sigmundsdóttir, Member of the Althing for the nationalist Progressive Party. The organization is sponsored by Bændasamtök Íslands, a farmers union in Iceland, and has received free advertising in their newspaper Bændablaðið.
