= Sigurbjörnsson =

Sigurbjörnsson is an Icelandic patronymic meaning "son of Sigurbjörn". In Icelandic names, it is not a family name. Notable people with the surname include:

- Álex Sigurbjörnsson (born 1988), Spanish rower
- Bergur Sigurbjörnsson (1917–2005), Icelandic magazine editor and politician
- Eiður Sigurbjörnsson (born 1990), Icelandic footballer
