= October 1959 Icelandic parliamentary election =

← June 1959	25 and 26 October 1959	1963 →
- All 40 seats in the Lower House and 20 seats in the Upper House of Althing
- Turnout: 90.37%
Party	Leader	Vote %	Seats	+/–
Upper House
Independence	Ólafur Thors	39.72	8	+1
Progressive	Hermann Jónasson	25.71	6	0
People's Alliance	Hannibal Valdimarsson	16.01	3	+1
Social Democratic	Emil Jónsson	15.17	3	+1
Lower House
Independence	Ólafur Thors	39.72	16	+3
Progressive	Hermann Jónasson	25.71	11	−2
People's Alliance	Hannibal Valdimarsson	16.01	7	+2
Social Democratic	Emil Jónsson	15.17	6	+2
This lists parties that won seats. See the complete results below.
Prime Minister before	Prime Minister after
Emil Jónsson; Social Democratic	Ólafur Thors; Independence

Early parliamentary elections were held in Iceland on 25 and 26 October 1959. Following the electoral reforms made after the June elections, the Independence Party won 16 of the 40 seats in the Lower House of the Althing.

== Electoral reforms ==
The June 1959 elections had ended with both the Independence Party and the Progressive Party winning 13 seats, despite the IP receiving 42% of the vote to the PP's 27%. The electoral system at the time was rural–urban proportional representation: a lower tier comprised single member constituencies elected using first-past-the-post voting, two-member constituencies elected using party-list proportional representation (party-list PR) and one large multi-member constituency for Reykjavík that also used party-list PR, topped up by an upper tier of eleven seats chosen from a single national compensatory list.

The reforms saw the replacement of this rural-urban proportional system with a two-tier party-list PR system; the lower tier now comprised eight multi-member constituencies, all elected using party-list PR. Five constituencies elected five members each, two elected six members each and Reykjavík elected 12. The number of seats for Reykjavík was also increased from the prior elections, increasing the overall total in the Lower House from 35 to 40 and in the Upper House from 17 to 20.

The voters’ capacity to change the order of names on the PR lists was greatly reduced compared to prior elections as well; the existing Borda count-based system was now only being used to calculate one-third of the final number of votes deemed to have been received by each candidate, while the party’s unaltered ordering determined the remaining two-thirds.

== Results ==
Party	Votes	%	Seats			
Party	Votes	%	Lower House	+/–	Upper House	+/–
Independence Party	33,800	39.72	16	+3	8	+1
Progressive Party	21,882	25.71	11	–2	6	0
People's Alliance	13,621	16.01	7	+2	3	+1
Social Democratic Party	12,909	15.17	6	+2	3	+1
National Preservation Party	2,883	3.39	0	0	0	0
Total	85,095	100.00	40	+5	20	+3
Valid votes	85,095	98.46				
Invalid/blank votes	1,331	1.54				
Total votes	86,426	100.00				
Registered voters/turnout	95,637	90.37				
Source: Nohlen & Stöver
