= 1933 Icelandic parliamentary election =

- 16 July 1933
- All 28 seats in the Lower House and 8 of 14 seats in the Upper House of Althing
- Turnout: 68.95%
Party	Leader	Vote %	Seats	+/–
Upper House (Note: Includes the three seats elected in 1930)
Independence	Jón Þorláksson	48.01	7	+1
Progressive	Ásgeir Ásgeirsson	23.91	5	−2
Social Democratic	Jón Baldvinsson	19.24	1	0
Independents	—	1.35	1	+1
Lower House
Independence	Jón Þorláksson	48.01	13	+4
Progressive	Ásgeir Ásgeirsson	23.91	11	−5
Social Democratic	Jón Baldvinsson	19.24	4	+1
This lists parties that won seats. See the complete results below.
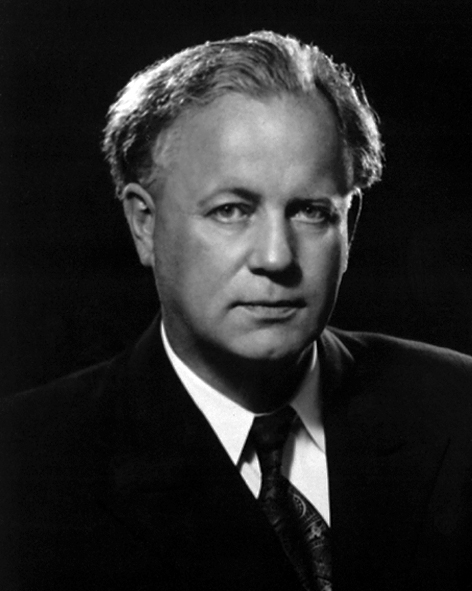

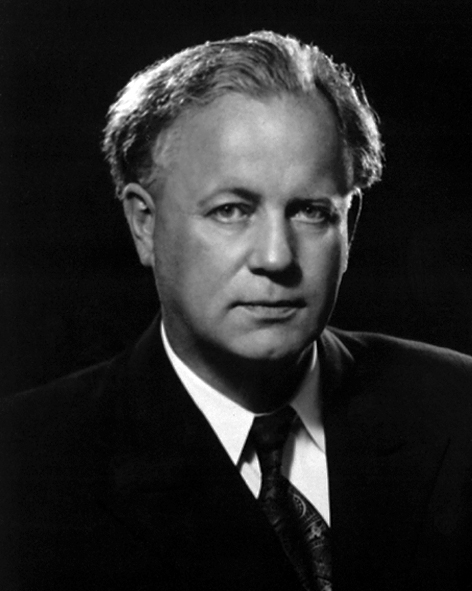
Prime Minister before	Prime Minister after
Ásgeir Ásgeirsson; Progressive	Ásgeir Ásgeirsson; Progressive

Parliamentary elections were held in Iceland on 16 July 1933. Voters elected all 28 seats in the Lower House of the Althing and eight of the fourteen seats in Upper House. The Independence Party emerged as the largest party in the Lower House, winning 13 of the 28 seats.

== Results ==
Party	Votes	%	Seats			
Party	Votes	%	Lower House	+/–	Upper House	+/–
Independence Party	17,131.5	48.01	13	+4	7	+1
Progressive Party	8,530.5	23.91	11	–5	5	–2
Social Democratic Party	6,864.5	19.24	4	+1	1	0
Communist Party	2,673.5	7.49	0	0	0	0
Independents	480	1.35	0	0	1	+1
Total	35,680	100.00	28	0	14	0
Valid votes	35,680	97.03				
Invalid/blank votes	1,091	2.97				
Total votes	36,771	100.00				
Registered voters/turnout	53,327	68.95				
Source: Nohlen & Stöver
