= Bergur Sigurbjörnsson =

Icelandic magazine editor and politician

- Born: 20 May 1917; Iceland
- Died: 28 July 2005 (aged 88); Iceland
- Occupations: Editor, politician

Bergur Sigurbjörnsson (20 May 1917 – 28 July 2005) was an Icelandic magazine editor and politician.

Bergur graduated from Akureyri High School in 1939. He then studied business administration in Reykjavík and graduated from the University of Iceland in 1943. He was a teacher at the Cooperative School in 1945–46. He studied business at the University of Iceland graduating in 1943, and later went on to study macroeconomics at Stockholm University graduating in 1948.

He founded the weekly magazine, Frjáls þjóð ('Free Nation') in 1952, and was the magazine's editor until 1967. He was a prominent supporter of Hannibal Valdimarsson's campaign to be elected to the Alþing as an independent. He himself ventured into politics, forming the National Preservation Party in 1953, for which he was a member between 1953 and 1956, and simultaneously taught mathematics at the Women's School in Reykjavík. He was a Deputy Member of Parliament for the Republic of Reykjavik between April 1964 and May 1965 (People's Alliance).

He was a proponent of complete self-determination for Iceland, and as such, strongly opposed both Iceland's membership of NATO and the 1951 American occupation of Iceland.

Bergur worked for the Wage Research Committee (Kjararannsóknanefnd) from 1965–68 when he moved to Egilsstaðir and became the director of the Association of Municipalities in the Eastern Constituency (SSA) from 1968–1971 and again from 1975–82. He was director of the State Construction Agency (Framkvæmdastofnunar ríkisins) in Reykjavík from 1972–74.
