= 1963 Icelandic parliamentary election =

← October 1959	9 June 1963	1967 →
- All 40 seats in the Lower House and 20 seats in the Upper House of Althing
- Turnout: 91.14%
Party	Leader	Vote %	Seats	+/–
Upper House
Independence	Bjarni Benediktsson	41.43	8	0
Progressive	Eysteinn Jónsson	28.22	6	0
People's Alliance	Hannibal Valdimarsson	15.98	3	0
Social Democratic	Emil Jónsson	14.21	3	0
Lower House
Independence	Bjarni Benediktsson	41.43	16	0
Progressive	Eysteinn Jónsson	28.22	13	+2
People's Alliance	Hannibal Valdimarsson	15.98	6	−1
Social Democratic	Emil Jónsson	14.21	5	−1
This lists parties that won seats. See the complete results below.
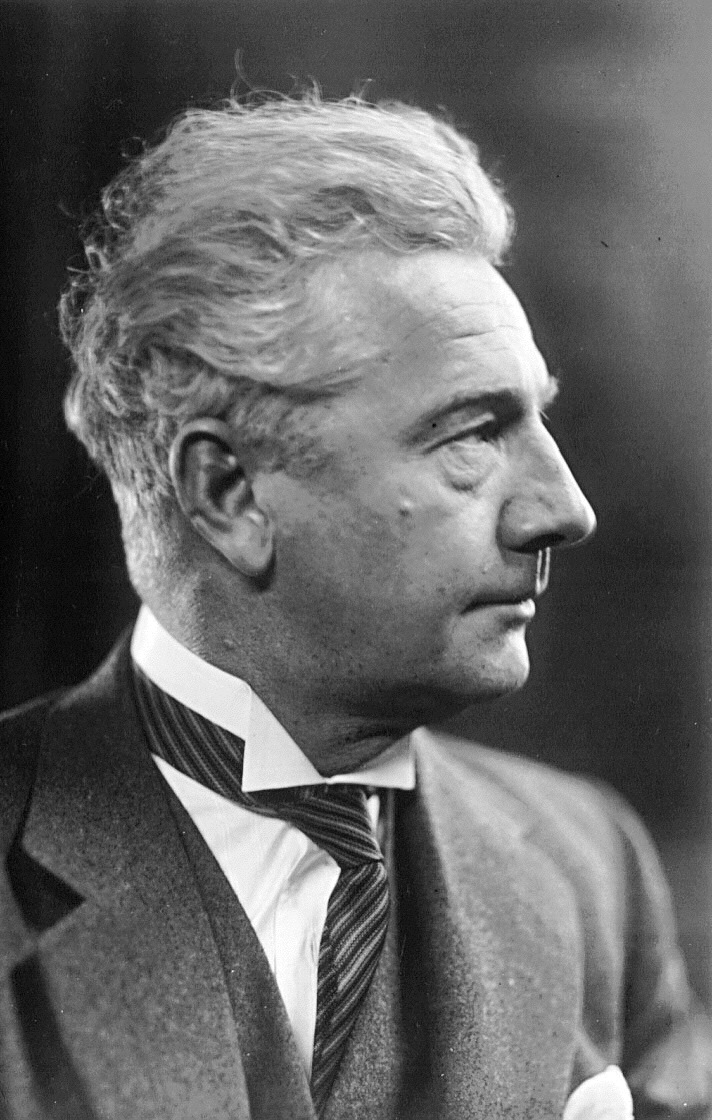

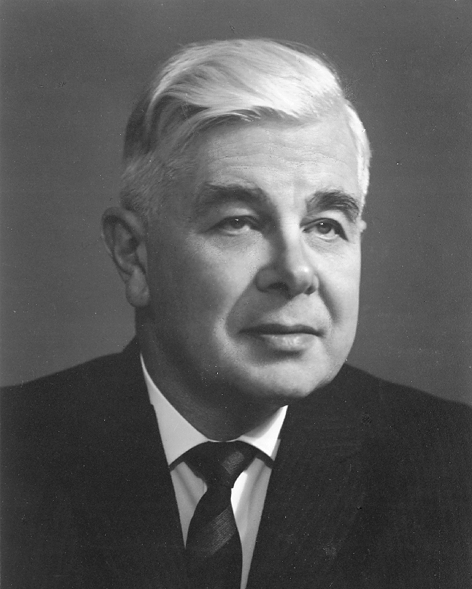
Prime Minister before	Prime Minister after
Ólafur Thors; Independence	Bjarni Benediktsson; Independence

Parliamentary elections were held in Iceland on 9 June 1963. The Independence Party won 16 of the 40 seats in the Lower House of the Althing. Bjarni Benediktsson became Prime Minister after the elections.

== Results ==
Party	Votes	%	Seats			
Party	Votes	%	Lower House	+/–	Upper House	+/–
Independence Party	37,021	41.43	16	0	8	0
Progressive Party	25,217	28.22	13	+2	6	0
People's Alliance	14,274	15.98	6	–1	3	0
Social Democratic Party	12,697	14.21	5	–1	3	0
Independents	143	0.16	0	New	0	New
Total	89,352	100.00	40	0	20	0
Valid votes	89,352	98.23				
Invalid/blank votes	1,606	1.77				
Total votes	90,958	100.00				
Registered voters/turnout	99,798	91.14				
Source: Nohlen & Stöver
