= Hjörleifur Guttormsson =

Icelandic politician (born 1935)

Hjörleifur Guttormsson (born 31 October 1935) is an Icelandic politician who served as the minister of industry from 1978 to 1979 and from 1980 to 1983.

He was member of parliament from 1978 to 1999 and one of the leaders of the Nordic Council from 1993 to 1995.
