= 1991 Icelandic parliamentary election =

← 1987	20 April 1991	1995 →
- All 42 seats in the Lower House and 21 seats in the Upper House of Althing
- Turnout: 87.62%
Party	Leader	Vote %	Seats	+/–
Upper House
Independence	Davíð Oddsson	38.56	9	+3
Progressive	Steingrímur Hermannsson	18.93	4	−1
Social Democratic	Jón Baldvin Hannibalsson	15.50	3	0
People's Alliance	Ólafur Ragnar Grímsson	14.39	3	0
Women's List		8.28	2	0
Lower House
Independence	Davíð Oddsson	38.56	17	+5
Progressive	Steingrímur Hermannsson	18.93	9	+1
Social Democratic	Jón Baldvin Hannibalsson	15.50	7	0
People's Alliance	Ólafur Ragnar Grímsson	14.39	6	+1
Women's List		8.28	3	−1
This lists parties that won seats. See the complete results below.
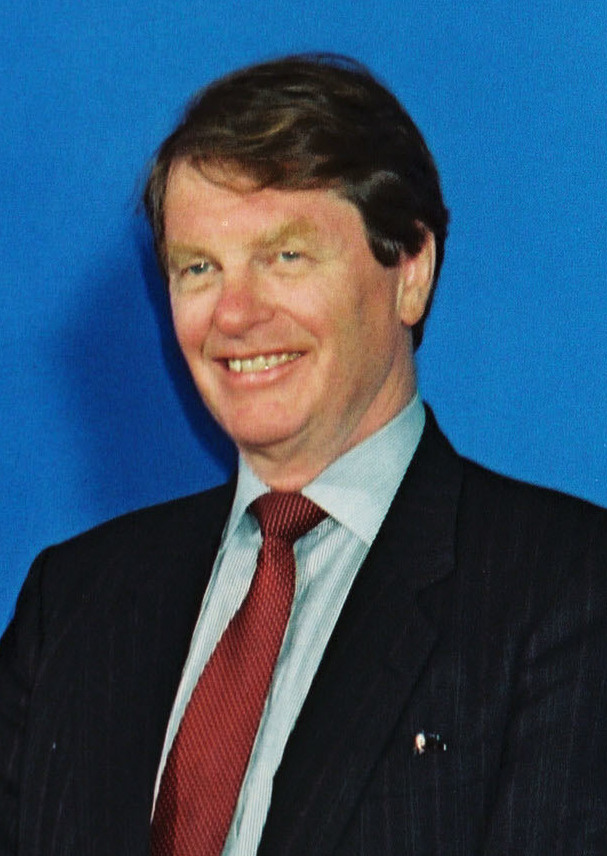

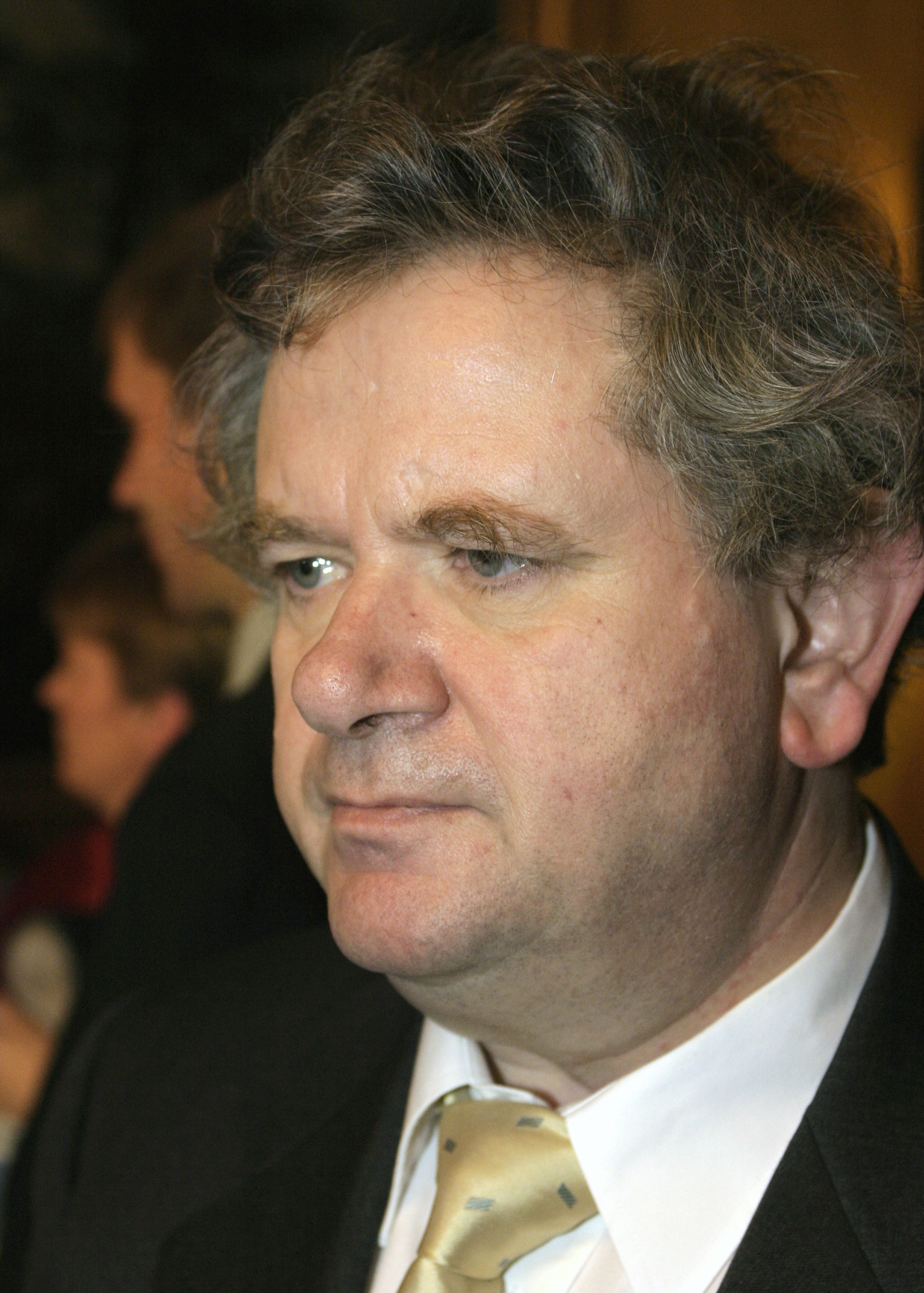
Prime Minister before	Prime Minister after
Steingrímur Hermannsson; Progressive	Davíð Oddsson; Independence

Parliamentary elections were held in Iceland on 20 April 1991. The Independence Party remained the largest party in the Lower House of the Althing, winning 17 of the 42 seats.

== Results ==
Party	Votes	%	Seats			
Party	Votes	%	Lower House	+/–	Upper House	+/–
Independence Party	60,836	38.56	17	+5	9	+3
Progressive Party	29,866	18.93	9	+1	4	–1
Social Democratic Party	24,459	15.50	7	0	3	0
People's Alliance	22,706	14.39	6	+1	3	0
Women's List	13,069	8.28	3	–1	2	0
People's Party–Humanist Party	2,871	1.82	0	0	0	0
Liberals	1,927	1.22	0	New	0	New
Home Rule Association	975	0.62	0	New	0	New
Green Candidature	502	0.32	0	New	0	New
Extreme Social Democrats	459	0.29	0	New	0	New
Labour Party of Iceland	99	0.06	0	New	0	New
Total	157,769	100.00	42	0	21	0
Valid votes	157,769	98.52				
Invalid/blank votes	2,373	1.48				
Total votes	160,142	100.00				
Registered voters/turnout	182,768	87.62				
Source: Nohlen & Stöver. Timarit

== Aftermath ==
Following constitutional changes made in 1991, the Upper and Lower Houses of the Althing were abolished, and all members became part of a unicameral parliament.
