= Union of Liberals and Leftists =

Union of Liberals and Leftists Samtök frjálslyndra og vinstrimanna
- Founder: Hannibal Valdimarsson; Björn Jónsson
- Founded: November 1969
- Dissolved: 1978
- Split from: National Preservation Party (People's Alliance)
- Headquarters: Reykjavík
- Ideology: Social liberalism
- Political position: Centre to centre-left

The Union of Liberals and Leftists (Icelandic: Samtök frjálslyndra og vinstrimanna) was a social-liberal political party in Iceland.

== History ==
The party was established in 1969 by dissidents from the People's Alliance who had formerly been members of the National Preservation Party. Its members had contested the 1967 elections as independents, but failed to win a seat. It won five seats in the 1971 elections, and joined Ólafur Jóhannesson's first government, with two ministers. However, it was reduced to two seats in the 1974 elections, and failed to win a seat in the 1978 elections. It did not contest the 1979 elections.

Later President of Iceland Ólafur Ragnar Grímsson was a member of this party together with later Foreign Affairs minister Jón Baldvin Hannibalsson.
