= 1971 Icelandic parliamentary election =

← 1967	13 June 1971	1974 →
- All 40 seats in the Lower House and 20 seats in the Upper House of Althing
- Turnout: 90.44%
Party	Leader	Vote %	Seats	+/–
Upper House
Independence	Jóhann Hafstein	36.22	7	−1
Progressive	Ólafur Jóhannesson	25.28	6	0
People's Alliance	Ragnar Arnalds	17.13	3	0
Social Democratic	Gylfi Þ. Gíslason	10.46	2	−1
Liberals & Leftists	Hannibal Valdimarsson	8.91	2	New
Lower House
Independence	Jóhann Hafstein	36.22	15	0
Progressive	Ólafur Jóhannesson	25.28	11	−1
People's Alliance	Ragnar Arnalds	17.13	7	0
Social Democratic	Gylfi Þ. Gíslason	10.46	4	−2
Liberals & Leftists	Hannibal Valdimarsson	8.91	3	New
This lists parties that won seats. See the complete results below.
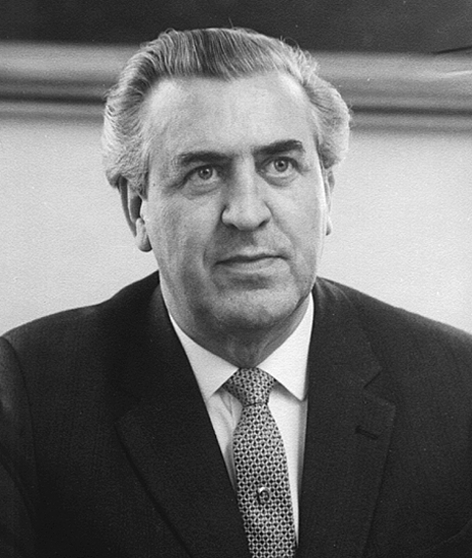
Prime Minister before	Prime Minister after
Jóhann Hafstein; Independence	Ólafur Jóhannesson; Progressive

Parliamentary elections were held in Iceland on 13 June 1971. Although the Independence Party remained the largest party in the Lower House of the Althing, winning 15 of the 40 seats, Independence Party leader Jóhann Hafstein resigned as Prime Minister the day after the elections as his party and its coalition partners had failed to win a majority of seats. Ólafur Jóhannesson of the Progressive Party succeeded him as Prime Minister, announcing the formation of a new coalition government on the same day. The new government's programme included expanding Icelandic fishing borders from 19 to 80 kilometers and gradually closing down Naval Air Station Keflavik but remaining committed to NATO membership.

== Results ==
Party	Votes	%	Seats			
Party	Votes	%	Lower House	+/–	Upper House	+/–
Independence Party	38,170	36.22	15	0	7	–1
Progressive Party	26,645	25.28	11	–1	6	0
People's Alliance	18,055	17.13	7	0	3	0
Social Democratic Party	11,020	10.46	4	–2	2	–1
Union of Liberals and Leftists	9,395	8.91	3	New	2	New
Candidature Party	2,110	2.00	0	New	0	New
Total	105,395	100.00	40	0	20	0
Valid votes	105,395	98.52				
Invalid/blank votes	1,580	1.48				
Total votes	106,975	100.00				
Registered voters/turnout	118,289	90.44				
Source: Nohlen & Stöver
