= Tómas Árnason =

Icelandic politician (1923–2014)

Tómas Árnason (21 July 1923 – 24 December 2014) was an Icelandic politician and former minister. He was the Minister of Finance of Iceland from 1978 to 1979. He was the governor of Central Bank of Iceland from 1985 to 1993.
