= Pálmi Jónsson (Minister of Agriculture) =

Icelandic politician and government minister

Pálmi Jónsson (born 11 November 1929 – 9 October 2017) was an Icelandic politician and former minister.
