= 1967 Icelandic parliamentary election =

← 1963	11 June 1967	1971 →
- All 40 seats in the Lower House and 20 seats in the Upper House of Althing
- Turnout: 91.37%
Party	Leader	Vote %	Seats	+/–
Upper House
Independence	Bjarni Benediktsson	37.50	8	0
Progressive	Eysteinn Jónsson	28.13	6	0
People's Alliance	Hannibal Valdimarsson	17.61	3	0
Social Democratic	Emil Jónsson	15.67	3	0
Lower House
Independence	Bjarni Benediktsson	37.50	15	−1
Progressive	Eysteinn Jónsson	28.13	12	−1
People's Alliance	Hannibal Valdimarsson	17.61	7	+1
Social Democratic	Emil Jónsson	15.67	6	+1
This lists parties that won seats. See the complete results below.
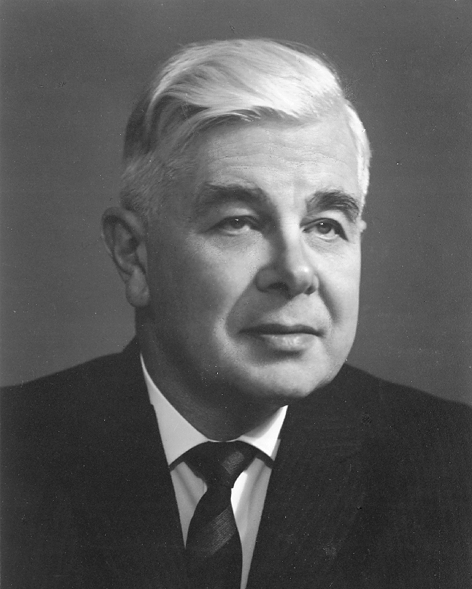

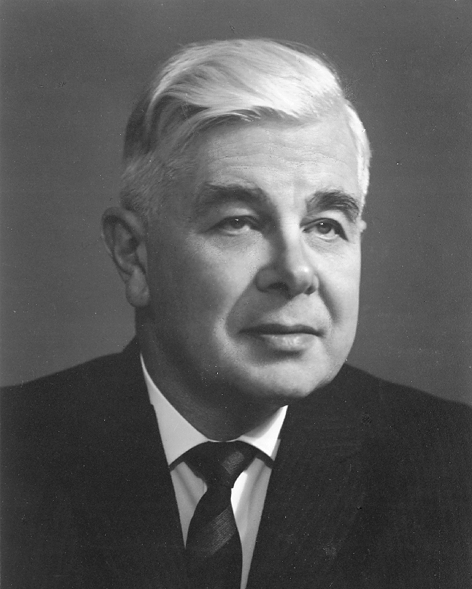
Prime Minister before	Prime Minister after
Bjarni Benediktsson; Independence	Bjarni Benediktsson; Independence

Parliamentary elections were held in Iceland on 11 June 1967. The Independence Party remained the largest party in the Lower House of the Althing, winning 15 of the 40 seats.

== Results ==
Party	Votes	%	Seats			
Party	Votes	%	Lower House	+/–	Upper House	+/–
Independence Party	36,036	37.50	15	–1	8	0
Progressive Party	27,029	28.13	12	–1	6	0
People's Alliance	16,923	17.61	7	+1	3	0
Social Democratic Party	15,059	15.67	6	+1	3	0
Independent Democratic Party	1,043	1.09	0	New	0	New
Total	96,090	100.00	40	0	20	0
Valid votes	96,090	98.20				
Invalid/blank votes	1,765	1.80				
Total votes	97,855	100.00				
Registered voters/turnout	107,101	91.37				
Source: Nohlen & Stöver
