= Vilhjálmur Hjálmarsson =

Icelandic politician (1914–2014)

Vilhjálmur Hjálmarsson (20 September 1914 – 14 July 2014) was an Icelandic politician and former minister.
