= 1978 Icelandic parliamentary election =

← 1974	25 June 1978	1979 →
- All 40 seats in the Lower House and 20 seats in the Upper House of Althing
- Turnout: 90.27%
Party	Leader	Vote %	Seats	+/–
Upper House
Independence	Geir Hallgrímsson	32.72	6	−2
People's Alliance	Lúdvik Jósepsson	22.87	5	+1
Social Democratic	Benedikt Gröndal	22.02	5	+3
Progressive	Ólafur Jóhannesson	16.90	4	−2
Lower House
Independence	Geir Hallgrímsson	32.72	14	−3
People's Alliance	Lúdvik Jósepsson	22.87	9	+2
Social Democratic	Benedikt Gröndal	22.02	9	+6
Progressive	Ólafur Jóhannesson	16.90	8	−3
This lists parties that won seats. See the complete results below.
Prime Minister before	Prime Minister after
Geir Hallgrímsson; Independence	Ólafur Jóhannesson; Progressive

Parliamentary elections were held in Iceland on 25 June 1978. The Independence Party remained the largest party in the Lower House of the Althing, winning 14 of the 40 seats. Following the election a coalition was formed between the People's Alliance, Social Democratic Party and the Progressive Party with Ólafur Jóhannesson as Prime Minister.

== Results ==
Party	Votes	%	Seats			
Party	Votes	%	Lower House	+/–	Upper House	+/–
Independence Party	39,982	32.72	14	–3	6	–2
People's Alliance	27,952	22.87	9	+2	5	+1
Social Democratic Party	26,912	22.02	9	+6	5	+3
Progressive Party	20,656	16.90	8	–3	4	–2
Union of Liberals and Leftists	4,073	3.33	0	–2	0	0
Independent Voters in the West Fjords (Note: Breakaway from the Union of Liberals and Leftists)	776	0.63	0	New	0	New
Independent Voters in Reykjanes	592	0.48	0	New	0	New
The Political Party	486	0.40	0	New	0	New
Independent Voters in the South (Note: Breakaway from the Independence Party)	466	0.38	0	New	0	New
Revolutionary Communist League	184	0.15	0	0	0	0
Communist Party of Iceland (Marxist–Leninist)	128	0.10	0	0	0	0
Total	122,207	100.00	40	0	20	0
Valid votes	122,207	98.26				
Invalid/blank votes	2,170	1.74				
Total votes	124,377	100.00				
Registered voters/turnout	137,782	90.27				
Source: Nohlen & Stöver
