= 1987 Icelandic parliamentary election =

← 1983	25 April 1987	1991 →
- All 42 seats in the Lower House and 21 seats in the Upper House of Althing
- Turnout: 90.10%
Party	Leader	Vote %	Seats	+/–
Upper House
Independence	Þorsteinn Pálsson	27.17	6	−2
Progressive	Steingrímur Hermannsson	18.92	5	+1
Social Democratic	Jón Baldvin Hannibalsson	15.23	3	+1
People's Alliance	Svavar Gestsson	13.35	3	0
Citizens'	Albert Guðmundsson	10.86	2	New
Women's List		10.13	2	+1
Lower House
Independence	Þorsteinn Pálsson	27.17	12	−3
Progressive	Steingrímur Hermannsson	18.92	8	−2
Social Democratic	Jón Baldvin Hannibalsson	15.23	7	+3
People's Alliance	Svavar Gestsson	13.35	5	−2
Citizens'	Albert Guðmundsson	10.86	5	New
Women's List		10.13	4	+2
Justice & Equality	Stefán Valgeirsson	1.24	1	New
This lists parties that won seats. See the complete results below.
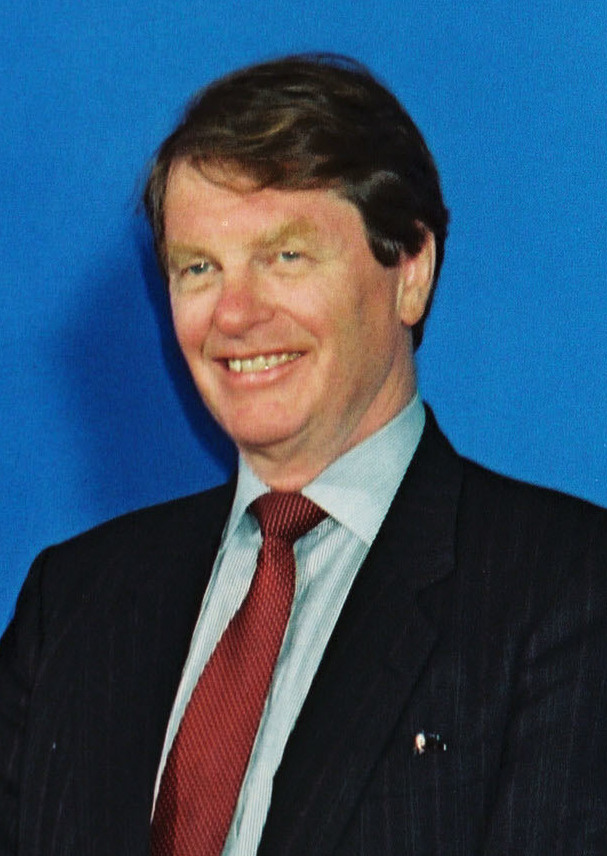

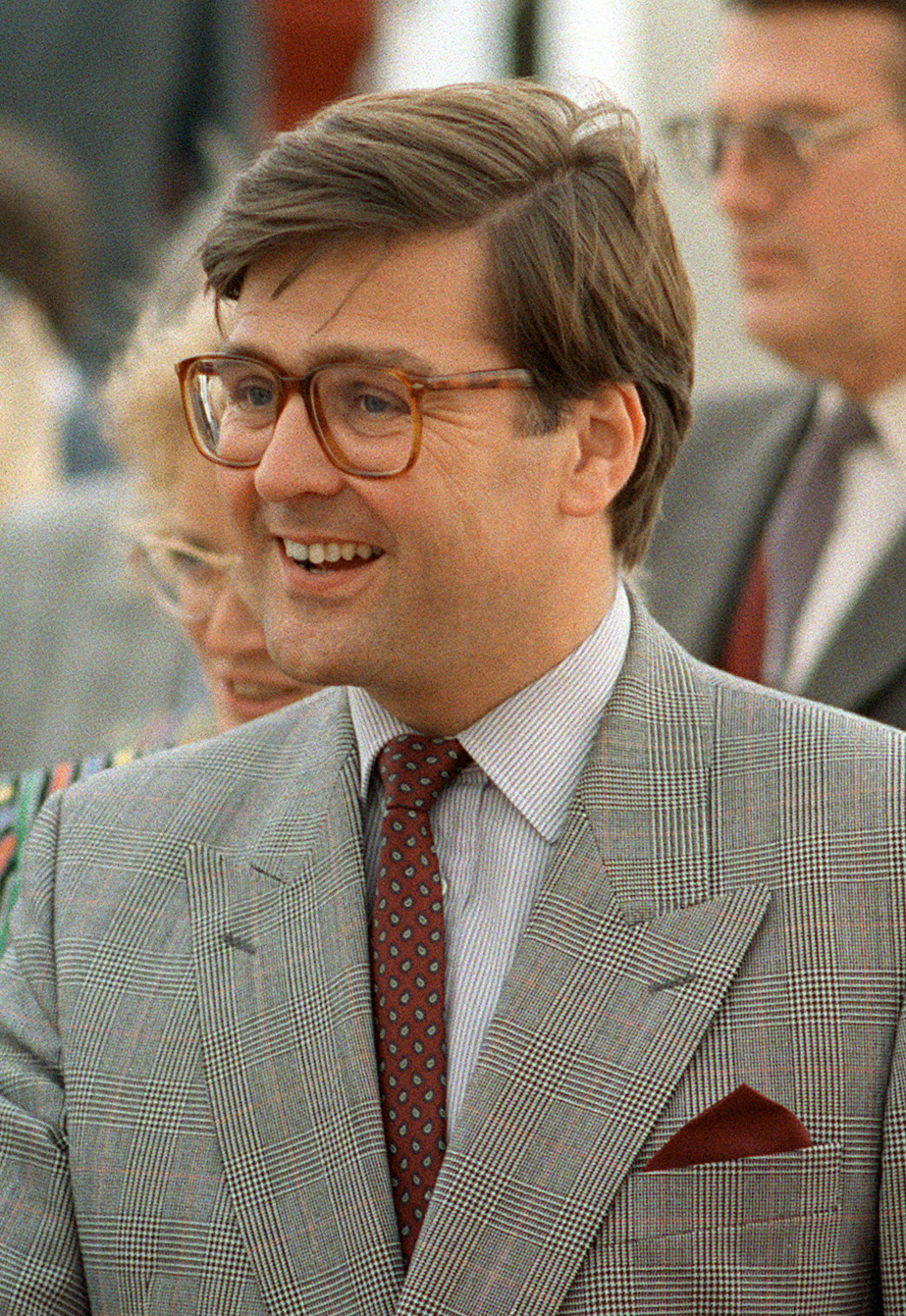
Prime Minister before	Prime Minister after
Steingrímur Hermannsson; Progressive	Þorsteinn Pálsson; Independence

Parliamentary elections were held in Iceland on 25 April 1987. The Independence Party remained the largest party in the Lower House of the Althing, winning 12 of the 42 seats.

The Independence Party and the People's Alliance experienced their worst election results to date. Two new parties, the Citizens' Party (which had split from the Independence Party) and the Women's Alliance, received more than 10 percent of the vote each. Commentators remarked that the election results suggested a further fracturing of the traditional four-party system in Iceland.

== Electoral reform ==
Prior to the election three extra seats were added to the Althing for Reykjavík (increasing representation from 11 to 14), one in the Upper House and two in the Lower House. The Hare quota replaced the D'Hondt method in the multi-member constituencies, although D'Hondt was still used for the compensatory seats.

Four constituencies elected five members each, two elected six members each, and one elected eight members, while Reykjavík elected 14. At least eight of the remaining nine seats were to be allocated to the constituencies before the election in order to reflect population. One seat could be allocated after the election, in order to help ensure proportionality across parties. A party threshold was introduced at the constituency level at two-thirds of a Hare quota; seats were eliminated one at a time and the threshold was then recalculated.

== Results ==
Party	Votes	%	+/–	Seats			
Party	Votes	%	+/–	Lower House	+/–	Upper House	+/–
Independence Party	41,490	27.17	–11.50	12	–3	6	–2
Progressive Party	28,902	18.92	–0.13	8	–2	5	1
Social Democratic Party	23,265	15.23	+3.52	7	+3	3	1
People's Alliance	20,387	13.35	–3.96	5	–2	3	0
Citizens' Party	16,588	10.86	New	5	New	2	New
Women's List	15,470	10.13	+4.65	4	+2	2	1
Humanist Party	2,434	1.59	New	0	New	0	New
National Party	2,047	1.34	New	0	New	0	New
Association for Justice and Equality	1,893	1.24	New	1	New	0	New
Alliance of Social Democrats	246	0.16	–7.14	0	–2	0	–2
Total	152,722	100.00	–	42	+2	21	+1
Valid votes	152,722	98.89					
Invalid/blank votes	1,716	1.11					
Total votes	154,438	100.00					
Registered voters/turnout	171,402	90.10					
Source: Nohlen & Stöver
