= 1974 Icelandic parliamentary election =

← 1971	30 June 1974	1978 →
- All 40 seats in the Lower House and 20 seats in the Upper House of Althing
- Turnout: 91.44%
Party	Leader	Vote %	Seats	+/–
Upper House
Independence	Geir Hallgrímsson	42.73	8	+1
Progressive	Ólafur Jóhannesson	24.87	6	0
People's Alliance	Ragnar Arnalds	18.34	4	+1
Social Democratic	Benedikt Gröndal	9.07	2	0
Lower House
Independence	Geir Hallgrímsson	42.73	17	+2
Progressive	Ólafur Jóhannesson	24.87	11	0
People's Alliance	Ragnar Arnalds	18.34	7	0
Social Democratic	Benedikt Gröndal	9.07	3	−1
Liberals & Leftists	Magnús Torfi Ólafsson	4.60	2	−2
This lists parties that won seats. See the complete results below.
Prime Minister before	Prime Minister after
Ólafur Jóhannesson; Progressive	Geir Hallgrímsson; Independence

Parliamentary elections were held in Iceland on 30 June 1974. The Independence Party remained the largest party in the Lower House of the Althing, winning 17 of the 40 seats. They formed a coalition with the Progressive Party and Independence Party leader Geir Hallgrímsson was elected Prime Minister.

== Background ==
Following the 1971 elections, a coalition government had been formed by the Progressive Party, People's Alliance and Union of Liberals and Leftists with the Progressives' Ólafur Jóhannesson as Prime Minister.

Early elections were triggered by the collapse of the coalition due to a petition to reconsider a policy that would close the United States naval base in Keflavik.

== Results ==
Party	Votes	%	Seats			
Party	Votes	%	Lower House	+/–	Upper House	+/–
Independence Party	48,764	42.73	17	+2	8	+1
Progressive Party	28,381	24.87	11	0	6	0
People's Alliance	20,924	18.34	7	0	4	+1
Social Democratic Party	10,345	9.07	3	–1	2	0
Union of Liberals and Leftists	5,245	4.60	2	–1	0	–2
Revolutionary Communist League	200	0.18	0	New	0	New
Communist Movement – Marxists-Leninists	121	0.11	0	New	0	New
Democratic Party in Reykjavík	67	0.06	0	New	0	New
Democratic Party in the North East	42	0.04	0	New	0	New
Democratic Party in Reykjanes	19	0.02	0	New	0	New
Total	114,108	100.00	40	0	20	0
Valid votes	114,108	98.73				
Invalid/blank votes	1,467	1.27				
Total votes	115,575	100.00				
Registered voters/turnout	126,388	91.44				
Source: Nohlen & Stöver
