= People's Alliance (Iceland) =

People's Alliance Alþýðubandalagið
- Founded: 4 April 1956
- Dissolved: 1998
- Merger of: People's Unity Party – Socialist Party
- Merged into: Social Democratic Alliance
- Succeeded by: Left-Green Movement (factions)
- Ideology: Democratic socialism; Eurocommunism
- Political position: Centre-left to left-wing

The People's Alliance (Icelandic: Alþýðubandalagið) was an electoral alliance in Iceland from 1956 to 1968 and a socialist political party from 1968 to 1998.

== History ==
In 1916, the Social Democratic Party (Alþýðuflokkurinn) was formed in Iceland. In 1930 the party split, leading to the formation of the Communist Party of Iceland (Kommúnistaflokkur Íslands), recognised as the Icelandic section of the Communist International. In 1937 the social democrats suffered another split, and the splinter group unified itself with the communists forming the Socialist Party (Sósíalistaflokkurinn). However, the new party did not become a ComIntern member as its forerunner. The first chairman of the People's Alliance was Ragnar Arnalds.

On 4 April 1956, the Socialist Party created an electoral alliance with yet another left-wing split of the Social Democratic Party led by Hannibal Valdimarsson, thus forming the People's Alliance with Hannibal as its chairman.

In 1963, National Preservation Party (Þjóðvarnarflokkurinn) contributed people to the joint electoral alliance, resulting in Gils Guðmundsson, a former member of parliament (1953–1956) for Þjóðvarnarflokkurinn gaining a seat in the parliament, which he held until 1979. In 1968 the People's Alliance officially became a political party. At that time Hannibal left and formed his own Union of Liberals and Leftists. The later president of Iceland, Ólafur Ragnar Grímsson, was chairman of the party from 1987 to 1995 after joining it coming from Union of Liberals and Leftists after he broke away from the Progressive Party.

In the mid-1960s, the U.S. States Department estimated the party membership to be approximately 1,000 (1% of the working age population of Iceland).

In 1998, it joined forces with the Social Democrat Party, the Women's Alliance (Samtök um kvennalista) and the National Awakening (Þjóðvaki) in forming the Social Democratic Alliance (Samfylkingin), a broad centre-left party. However the People's Alliance continues to exist on papers until its debts are paid. Some members of the People's Alliance did not support the forming of the Alliance, including some MPs of the party, and formed the Left-Green Movement (Vinstrihreyfingin – grænt framboð), a socialist-green party, in 1999.

The party was not a communist party, but it used to be the Icelandic referent of the World Communist Movement. It was opposed to NATO and the presence of U.S. military forces in Iceland. It was also opposed to Icelandic membership of the European Union and the EEA agreement in 1993 between the EFTA and the EU, Iceland being a member of EFTA.

It participated in five coalition governments from 1956 to 1991, beginning in Hermann Jónasson's last government 1956–1958, then in both of Ólafur Jóhannesson's governments 1in 1971–1974 and in 1978–1979, then in Gunnar Thoroddsen's only government 1980–1983 and finally in Steingrímur Hermannsson's latter government in 1988–1991.

The youth league of the People's Alliance was known as ÆFAB.

== Election results ==
Election	Votes	%	Seats	+/–	Position	Government
1956	15,859	19.2	8 / 52	▲8	▲4th	Coalition
1959 (Jun)	12,929	15.2	6 / 52	▼2	▲3rd	Opposition
1959 (Oct)	13,621	16.0	10 / 60	▲4	3rd	Opposition
1963	14,274	16.0	9 / 60	▼1	3rd	Opposition
1967	16,923	17.6	10 / 60	▲1	3rd	Opposition
1971	18,055	17.1	10 / 60	0	3rd	Coalition
1974	20,924	18.3	11 / 60	▲1	3rd	Opposition
1978	27,952	22.9	14 / 60	▲3	▲2nd	Coalition
1979	24,401	19.7	11 / 60	▼3	▼3rd	Coalition
1983	22,490	17.3	10 / 60	▼1	3rd	Opposition
1987	20,387	13.3	8 / 63	▼2	▼4th	Opposition
1991	22,706	14.4	9 / 63	▲1	4th	Opposition
1995	23,597	14.3	9 / 63	0	▲3rd	Opposition

== Chairpersons ==
Chairperson	Period
Hannibal Valdimarsson	1956–1968
Ragnar Arnalds	1968–1977
Lúdvik Jósepsson	1977–1980
Svavar Gestsson	1980–1987
Ólafur Ragnar Grímsson	1987–1995
Margrét Frímannsdóttir	1995–1998

== Sources ==
- Hannes H. Gissurarson: Communism in Iceland, 1918–1998 Social Science Research Institute at the University of Iceland, Reykjavik 2021.
