= Hermann Jónasson =

Icelandic politician

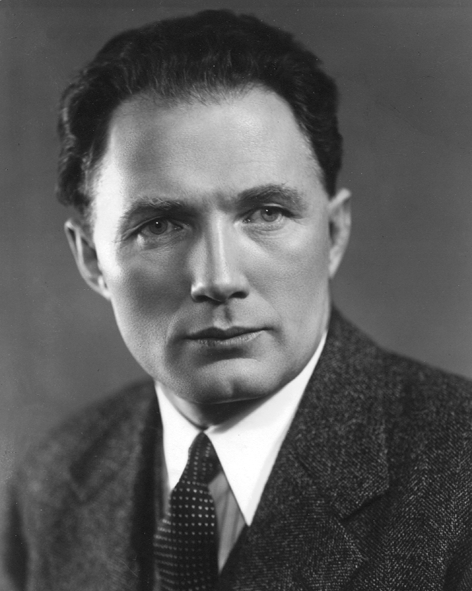

11th Prime Minister of Iceland
- In office 24 July 1956 – 23 December 1958
- President: Ásgeir Ásgeirsson
- Preceded by: Ólafur Thors
- Succeeded by: Emil Jónsson
- In office 28 July 1934 – 16 May 1942
- Monarch: Christian X
- Preceded by: Ásgeir Ásgeirsson
- Succeeded by: Ólafur Thors

Personal details
- Born: 25 December 1896 Skagafjörður, Iceland
- Died: 22 January 1976 (aged 79) Reykjavík, Iceland
- Party: Progressive Party
- Spouse: Vigdís Steingrímsdóttir
- Children: 5 (2 stillbirth) (1 illegitimate)
- Education: University of Iceland

Hermann Jónasson (25 December 1896 – 22 January 1976) was an politician from Iceland's Progressive Party who served as prime minister of Iceland from 1934 to 1942 and again from 1956 to 1958.

He served his first term from 28 July 1934 to 16 May 1942. This term included one of the most difficult times in Icelandic history. In the pre-war years he had to deal with constant pressures from Nazi Germany and the United Kingdom regarding Iceland's diplomatic stance. After World War II started, the German occupation of Denmark severed the ties between the two countries, forcing Iceland to assume full control over its foreign interests which had previously been represented by Denmark. Subsequently, the British occupied Iceland on 10 May 1940.

His second term lasted from 24 July 1956 to 23 December 1958. In the elections of 1956 the Progressive Party and the Social Democratic Party joined forces and formed an electoral alliance that became known as the "Fear-Alliance" (Icelandic: Hræðslubandalagið), the fear in question being the fear of the Independence Party. After the elections, the "Fear-Alliance" formed a coalition with The People's Alliance. This was Iceland's first leftist government, and was plagued with troubles from the outset, not the least of which was the relative hostility and distrust of the United States and other NATO allies. The coalition eventually fell apart, giving way to the long-lasting "Reconstruction Government" of the Independence Party and the Social Democrats.

As Iceland's Minister for Justice during the 1930s, Hermann was principally responsible for Iceland's near-total refusal to harbor Jewish refugees fleeing Nazi persecution from mainland Europe. In July 1938, Iceland's government issued a declaration stating that it would not grant residence permits to German or Austrian Jews, before also excluding Czech Jews the next year. In May 1938, Hermann declared Iceland a "tightly shut country". After the events of the Night of the Broken Glass in November 1938, Iceland's ambassador in Copenhagen Sveinn Björnsson sent Hermann a letter asking if the government would consider changing its policy in light of changed circumstances. In his reply letter, Hermann answered that his government was "opposed on principle" to granting residence permits to German Jews.

Hermann's government justified its refusal to harbor Jewish refugees by referring to the poor economic conditions in Iceland. However, multiple sources, including refugee Hans Mann, Danish diplomat C. A. C. Brun and British diplomat Berkeley Gage, quoted Hermann as having had racial motivations for denying entry to Jews specifically, noting that he had been concerned about protecting the "pure race" of Icelanders. Around thirty Jews were given deportation notices from May 1936 to May 1939, and at least sixteen were deported.

He was the father of Steingrímur Hermannsson, who would go on to become Prime Minister of Iceland in the 1980s. His grandson, Guðmundur Steingrímsson, was elected to the Althing in 2009.

In 2007 Hermann was the subject of a mild controversy, when DNA-testing proved that he had, during his years as a public official, fathered a child out of wedlock. A lawyer named Lúðvík Gizurarson had for several years claimed to be Hermann's illegitimate son. He filed a paternity case in 2004 and after several years of legal battles, a DNA test in 2007 indicated a 99.9% probability that Hermann was Lúðvík's father.

Political offices
Preceded by Ásgeir Ásgeirsson	Prime Minister of Iceland; 1934–1942	Succeeded by Ólafur Thors
Preceded by Ólafur Thors	Prime Minister of Iceland; 1956–1958	Succeeded by Emil Jónsson
Party political offices
Preceded by Jónas Jónsson	Leader of the Progressive Party; 1944–1962	Succeeded by Eysteinn Jónsson
