= Ragnar Arnalds =

Icelandic politician (1938–2022)

Ragnar Arnalds (8 July 1938 – 15 September 2022) was an Icelandic MP and twice cabinet minister. He studied literature and philosophy in Sweden from 1959 to 1961 and graduated with a law degree from the University of Iceland in 1968. He was editor of Frjáls þjóð in 1960.

Arnalds served as a Minister of Education and Transportation from 1978 to 1979 and Minister of Finance of Iceland from 1980 to 1983. He was chairman of the People's Alliance (Alþýðubandalagið) from 1968 to 1977. He also served as chairman of Heimssýn, the Icelandic organisation opposed to membership of the European Union, from 2002 to 2009.

Arnalds served as a member of the board of governors of the Central Bank of Iceland. He was a member of the Left-Green Movement (Vinstrihreyfingin - grænt framboð).

Arnalds is also the author of several plays.
