= 1995 Icelandic parliamentary election =

- 8 April 1995
- All 63 seats in the Althing
- Turnout: 87.38%
Party	Leader	Vote %	Seats	+/–
Independence	Davíð Oddsson	37.07	25	−1
Progressive	Halldór Ásgrímsson	23.32	15	+2
People's Alliance	Ólafur Ragnar Grímsson	14.30	9	0
Social Democratic	Jón Baldvin Hannibalsson	11.42	7	−3
National Awakening	Jóhanna Sigurðardóttir	7.15	4	New
Women's List		4.87	3	−2
This lists parties that won seats. See the complete results below.
Results by constituency
Prime Minister before	Prime Minister after election
Davíð Oddsson; Independence	Davíð Oddsson; Independence

Parliamentary elections were held in Iceland on 8 April 1995. They were the first elections after the Althing became a unicameral parliament in 1991. The Independence Party remained the largest party, winning 25 of the 63 seats. The coalition government of the Independence Party and Progressive Party remained in office, with Davíð Oddsson continuing as Prime Minister.

== Electoral system changes ==
Compared to prior elections where eight seats were to be allocated to the constituencies before the election in order to reflect population and one seat could be allocated after the election, all seats were allocated before the election to constituencies.

== Results ==
Party	Votes	%	+/–	Seats	+/–
Independence Party	61,183	37.07	–1.49	25	–1
Progressive Party	38,485	23.32	+4.39	15	+2
People's Alliance	23,597	14.30	–0.09	9	0
Social Democratic Party	18,846	11.42	–4.08	7	–3
National Awakening	11,806	7.15	New	4	New
Women's List	8,031	4.87	–3.41	3	–2
South List	1,105	0.67	New	0	New
Natural Law Party	957	0.58	New	0	New
Westfjords List	717	0.43	New	0	New
Christian Political Movement	316	0.19	New	0	New
Total	165,043	100.00	–	63	0
Valid votes	165,043	98.39			
Invalid/blank votes	2,708	1.61			
Total votes	167,751	100.00			
Registered voters/turnout	191,973	87.38			
Source: Nohlen & Stöver, Election Resources
