= Social Democratic Party (Iceland) =

Political party in Iceland (1916–2000)

Social Democratic Party Alþýðuflokkurinn
- Chairman: Ottó N. Þorláksson (first); Guðmundur Árni Stefánsson (last)
- Founded: 12 March 1916
- Dissolved: 5 May 2000
- Merged into: Social Democratic Alliance
- Ideology: Social democracy
- Political position: Centre-left
- International affiliation: Socialist International
- Colours: Red

Election symbol
- A

Website
- jafnadarmenn.is (archived)

The Social Democratic Party (Icelandic: Alþýðuflokkurinn, lit. 'People's Party') was a social-democratic political party in Iceland.

It was founded in 1916, as the political representation of the trade unions of Iceland.

== History ==
In 1920, its first member of the Althing, the Icelandic parliament, Jón Baldvinsson was elected.

The party would contest elections to the Althing with little success until 1934, when the party obtained 10 parliamentary seats. Iceland shifted towards a proportional representation system later that year which political scientist Amel Ahmed attributes to the rising electoral threat that the Social Democratic Party posed to the Independence Party and Progressive Party.

Between 1926 and 1940, the party was a member of the Labour and Socialist International.

The party led the government of Iceland three times, first in 1947–1949 under Stefán Jóhann Stefánsson, then in 1958–1959 under Emil Jónsson and finally under Benedikt Sigurðsson Gröndal in 1979–1980.

Its longest participation in government was with the Independence Party from 1959 to 1971.

The Social Democratic Party was succeeded in 2000 by the Social Democratic Alliance, a centre-left party with a wider political base created by the merger of the Social Democratic Party with the National Awakening, the People's Alliance and the Women's List.

== Party chairmen ==
- Ottó N. Þorláksson (1916)
- Jón Baldvinsson (1916–1938)
- Stefán Jóhann Stefánsson (1938–1952)
- Hannibal Valdimarsson (1952–1954)
- Haraldur Guðmundsson (1954–1958)
- Emil Jónsson (1958–1968)
- Gylfi Þorsteinsson Gíslason (1968–1974)
- Benedikt Sigurðsson Gröndal (1974–1980)
- Kjartan Jóhannsson (1980–1984)
- Jón Baldvin Hannibalsson (1984–1996)
- Sighvatur Kristinn Björgvinsson (1996–1998)
- Guðmundur Árni Stefánsson (1998–2000)

== Election results ==
Election	Votes	%	Seats	+/–	Position	Government
October 1916	903.5	6.8	1 / 40	▲1	6th	Opposition
1919	949	6.8	0 / 40	▼1	▲4th	Extra-parliamentary
1923	4,912.5	16.2	1 / 42	▲1	▲3rd	Opposition
1927	6,097.5	19.0	5 / 42	▲4	3rd	Opposition
1931	6,197.5	16.1	4 / 42	▼2	3rd	Opposition
1933	6,864.5	19.2	5 / 42	▲1	3rd	Opposition
1934	11,269.5	21.7	10 / 49	▲5	3rd	Coalition
1937	11,084.5	19.0	8 / 49	▼2	3rd	Opposition
1942 (Jul)	8,979	15.4	6 / 49	▼2	▼4th	Opposition
1942 (Oct)	8,455	14.2	7 / 52	▲1	4th	Opposition
1946	11,914	17.8	9 / 52	▲2	4th	Coalition
1949	11,937	16.5	7 / 52	▼2	4th	Opposition
1953	12,093	15.6	6 / 52	▼1	4th	Opposition
1956	15,153	18.3	8 / 52	▲2	▲3rd	Coalition
1959 (Jun)	10,632	12.5	6 / 52	▼2	▼4th	Minority
1959 (Oct)	12,909	15.2	9 / 60	▲3	4th	Coalition
1963	12,697	14.2	8 / 60	▼1	4th	Coalition
1967	15,059	15.7	9 / 60	▲1	4th	Coalition
1971	11,020	10.5	6 / 60	▼3	4th	Opposition
1974	10,345	9.1	5 / 60	▼1	4th	Opposition
1978	26,912	22.0	14 / 60	▲9	▲3rd	Coalition
1979	21,580	17.4	10 / 60	▼4	▼4th	Opposition
1983	15,214	11.7	6 / 60	▼4	4th	Opposition
1987	23,265	15.2	10 / 60	▲4	▲3rd	Coalition
1991	24,459	15.5	10 / 63	0	3rd	Coalition
1995	18,846	11.4	7 / 63	▼3	▼4th	Opposition
