= 1979 Icelandic parliamentary election =

- 2 and 3 December 1979
- All 40 seats in the Lower House and 20 seats in the Upper House of Althing
- Turnout: 89.34%
Party	Leader	Vote %	Seats	+/–
Upper House
Independence	Geir Hallgrímsson	35.42	7	+1
Progressive	Steingrímur Hermannsson	24.94	6	+2
People's Alliance	Lúdvik Jósepsson	19.72	4	−1
Social Democratic	Benedikt Gröndal	17.44	3	−2
Lower House
Independence	Geir Hallgrímsson	35.42	14	0
Progressive	Steingrímur Hermannsson	24.94	11	+3
People's Alliance	Lúdvik Jósepsson	19.72	7	−2
Social Democratic	Benedikt Gröndal	17.44	7	−2
Independent Voters	Eggert Haukdal	1.20	1	New
This lists parties that won seats. See the complete results below.
Prime Minister before	Prime Minister after
Benedikt Gröndal; Social Democratic	Gunnar Thoroddsen; Independence

Parliamentary elections were held in Iceland on 2 and 3 December 1979. The Independence Party remained the largest party in the Lower House of the Althing, winning 14 of the 40 seats.

== Background ==
The 1978 parliamentary election resulted in a hard swing to the left in Icelandic politics. Progressive party leader and former Premier Ólafur Jóhanesson emerged as the head of a coalition consisting of his Progressives, the Social Democrats, and the People's Alliance. Very quickly the disparate views of the coalition began to make themselves very clear, especially in terms of foreign policy.

The Progressives were a traditionally isolationist party who supported Iceland's membership in NATO but opposed the U.S. Navy base in Keflavik. These views were not shared with their coalition partners as the People's Alliance opposed both NATO and the Keflavik base, and the Social Democrats were supportive of both.

Furthermore the coalition faced intense economic scrutiny for their reaction to the inflation crisis. The coalition acted to devalue the Icelandic Krona for the fourth time since 1974. This massively undermined the credibility of the People's Alliance as they had promised to not devalue the Krona.

The government collapsed after the Social Democratic party withdrew following the news that inflation had hit 85%. The Social Democrats led the interim government that brought Iceland into its first winter election.

== Results ==
Party	Votes	%	Seats			
Party	Votes	%	Lower House	+/–	Upper House	+/–
Independence Party	43,838	35.42	14	0	7	+1
Progressive Party	30,861	24.94	11	+3	6	+2
People's Alliance	24,401	19.72	7	–2	4	–1
Social Democratic Party	21,580	17.44	7	–2	3	–2
Independent Voters in the South (Note: Breakaway from the Independence Party)	1,484	1.20	1	+1	0	0
Independent Voters in the North East	857	0.69	0	New	0	New
Revolutionary Communist League	480	0.39	0	0	0	0
The Other Party	158	0.13	0	New	0	New
The Sunshine Party	92	0.07	0	New	0	New
Total	123,751	100.00	40	0	20	0
Valid votes	123,751	97.50				
Invalid/blank votes	3,178	2.50				
Total votes	126,929	100.00				
Registered voters/turnout	142,073	89.34				
Source: Nohlen & Stöver

=== By constituency ===
Constituency	People's Alliance	Social Democratic	Progressive	Independence	Other
Eastern	31.22%	6.00%	42.94%	19.84%	0.00%
Northeastern	15.93%	13.31%	43.87%	20.52%	6.38%
Northwestern	17.24%	10.71%	43.91%	28.14%	0.00%
Reykjanes	18.29%	24.18%	17.32%	39.85%	0.36%
Reykjavík	22.27%	17.77%	14.83%	43.82%	1.30%
Southern	14.92%	14.83%	32.44%	23.46%	14.34%
Westfjords	15.03%	22.10%	30.60%	32.27%	0.00%
Western	16.04%	15.53%	37.49%	30.93%	0.00%
Source: Constituency Level Election Archive

== Aftermath ==
The government was formed in February 1980 as Independence Party deputy leader Gunnar Thoroddson (followed by two fellow dissidents) broke ranks with his party and formed a coalition with the People's Alliance and the Progressives.

=== Portfolios ===
The People's Alliance were given the following three ministries after coalition talks: Energy, Finance, and Health/Social Security

The Progressives were given five ministries: the Foreign ministry, Fisheries, Trade/Commerce, Communications, and Education

Leaving the Independents: The premiership, Agriculture, and Justice.
