= Emil Jónsson =

Icelandic politician

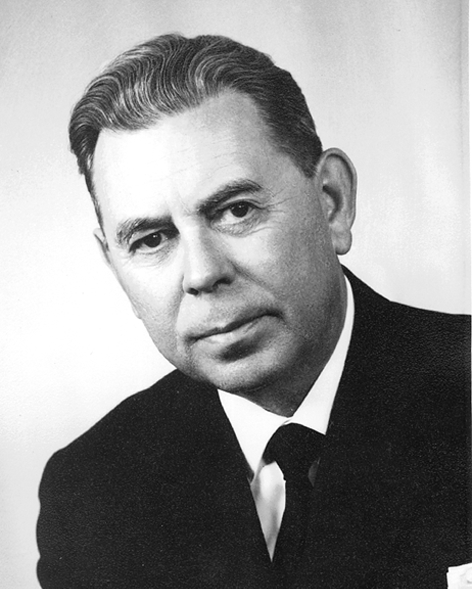

16th Prime Minister of Iceland
- In office 23 December 1958 – 20 November 1959
- President: Ásgeir Ásgeirsson
- Preceded by: Hermann Jónasson
- Succeeded by: Ólafur Thors

Personal details
- Born: 27 October 1902 Hafnarfjörður, Iceland
- Died: 30 November 1986 (aged 84) Reykjavík, Iceland
- Party: Social Democratic Party
- Education: University of Copenhagen

Guðmundur Emil Jónsson (27 October 1902 – 30 November 1986) was prime minister of Iceland from 23 December 1958 to 20 November 1959.

He first became minister of Fisheries and Social affairs. He was a chairman of the Social Democratic Party (Alþýðuflokkurinn) from 1956 to 1968. He was a member of the Althingi from 1934 to 1971, and its speaker from 1956 to 1958.

Political offices
Preceded by Hermann Jónasson	Prime Minister of Iceland; 1958–1959	Succeeded by Ólafur Thors
