= Eysteinn Jónsson =

Icelandic politician (1906–1993)

Eysteinn Jónsson (13 November 1906 – 11 August 1993) was an Icelandic politician and former minister. He was one of the biggest politicians and figures of Icelandic politics in the 20th century. He was the Minister of Finance of Iceland from 1934 to 1939 and from 1950 to 1954 and from 1954 to 1958. He served as speaker of the Althing from 1971 to 1974. He served as the leader of the Progressive Party from 1962 to 1968. Eysteinn identified as a left-wing politician and generally had socialist views.
