= Jón Baldvin Hannibalsson =

Icelandic politician and diplomat

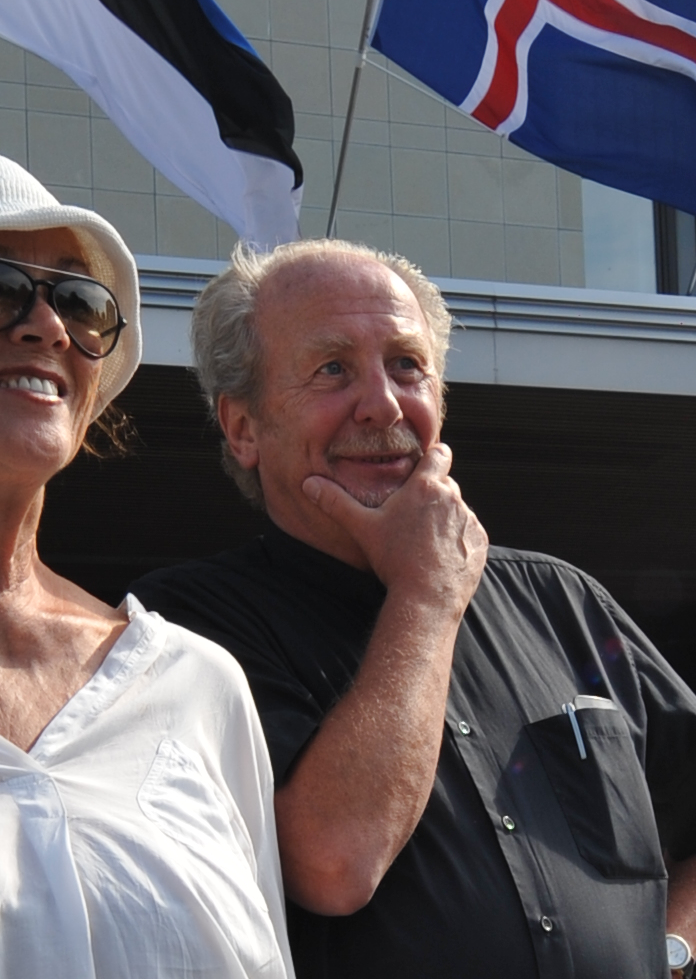

Minister of Foreign Affairs
- In office 28 September 1988 – 23 April 1995
- Prime Minister: Steingrímur Hermannsson; Davíð Oddsson
- Preceded by: Steingrímur Hermannsson
- Succeeded by: Halldór Ásgrímsson

Minister of Finance
- In office 8 July 1987 – 28 September 1988
- Prime Minister: Þorsteinn Pálsson
- Preceded by: Þorsteinn Pálsson
- Succeeded by: Ólafur Ragnar Grímsson

Personal details
- Born: 21 February 1939 (age 87) Ísafjörður, Iceland
- Party: Social Democratic Party

Jón Baldvin Hannibalsson (born 21 February 1939) is an Icelandic politician and diplomat. He was Minister of Finance from 1987 to 1988 and Minister of Foreign Affairs from 1988 to 1995.

He is known in the Baltics as, at his initiative, Iceland became the first nation to recognize the independence of the Baltic states in 1991.

== Education ==
The son of Hannibal Valdimarsson, Jón Baldvin Hannibalsson earned an MA in Economics from the University of Edinburgh in 1963. He studied at Stockholm University from 1963 to 1964, and studied to become a teacher at the University of Iceland in 1965. He attended Harvard University's Center for European Studies from 1976 to 1977.

== Editor ==
From 1964 and until its closure in 1967, Hannibalsson was an editor of Frjáls þjóð. He also edited Alþýðublaðið (1979–1982).

== Political career ==
- Chairman of the Icelandic Social Democratic Party (1984–1996)
- Minister of Finance 1987–1988
- Minister of Foreign Affairs 1988–1995

== European Economic Area ==
Jón Baldvin Hannibalsson led Iceland's delegation while Iceland participated in forming the European Economic Area.

== Diplomatic career ==
Later he served as a diplomat in the United States and Mexico from 1998 to 2002 and to Finland, Estonia, Latvia and Lithuania from 2002 to 2005. Ambassador to Ukraine from 2004 to 2006. He recognized the Baltic States' independence in 1991, as the only western foreign minister to arrive on the scene in January 1991 when Gorbachev was at the brink of a military crack down. He has published a book detailing these experiences, titled "The Baltic road to freedom - Iceland's role" in 2017.

== Legacy ==
In January 1991, after the bloodshed in Vilnius, he started the process of reestablishing diplomatic connections between Lithuania and Iceland. Thus Iceland was the first state to take a conflict with the Soviet Union to support Baltic freedom.

In recognition, the square in front of Estonian Foreign Ministry in Tallinn is named as "Iceland Square", and on the grounds of the Lithuanian Seimas (Parliament) the rocks of the last barricades from January 1991 bear the inscription "To Iceland – They Dared When Others Remained Silent".

For his role in recognizing Lithuania's independence, Jón Baldvin was awarded Commander's Grand Cross of the Order of the Lithuanian Grand Duke Gediminas (1996), as well as Medal of 13 January and title of honorary citizen of Vilnius. He is also a recipient of the Estonian Order of the Cross of Terra Mariana, 1st Class (1996) and the Latvian Order of the Three Stars (3rd class).

He was, purportedly, the first western foreign minister in the world to recognize Croatia as a sovereign nation in 1991.

== Sexual harassment scandal ==
In 2012, it was revealed that during the period 1998–2001, Jón Baldvin sent a number of sexually explicit letters to Guðrún Harðardóttir, a young niece of his wife. In one of the letters, Jón Baldvin graphically described having sex with his wife. Other letters contained sexually explicit and erotic themes. Guðrún, who was 14–17 years of age at the time, attempted to push charges against Jón Baldvin for sexual harassment in 2005, but investigations were dropped by police.

Jón Baldvin's letters were revealed to the public by Guðrún in the monthly magazine Nýtt Líf in February 2012, and subsequently he issued statements on his personal website. In his statements, he denied that he had sexually harassed Guðrún, but apologized for a "lapse of judgment" in initiating the correspondence with her.

In 2013, the scandal re-emerged when Jón Baldvin was invited to teach as guest lecturer at the University of Iceland. Following public objections to the hiring of him, the University of Iceland withdrew the invitation. Jón Baldvin protested the University's decision in a series of newspaper articles. After Jón Baldvin threatened to sue, due to there being no legal grounds for his firing, the University agreed to pay him 500.000 ISK in compensations and publicly apologized for how they handled the matter.

In 2022, Icelandic media reported about accusations of sexual harassment during Jón Baldvin's time as a 31 year old teacher in 1970.
