= Progressive Party (Iceland) =

Progressive Party Framsóknarflokkurinn
- Chairperson: Lilja Dögg Alfreðsdóttir
- Vice-chairperson: Stefán Vagn Stefánsson
- Leader of the parliamentary group: Stefán Vagn Stefánsson
- Chairperson of the municipal council: Einar Freyr Elínarson
- Founded: 16 December 1916
- Merger of: Farmers' Party; Independent Farmers
- Headquarters: Bæjarlind 14-16, 201 Kópavogur
- Youth wing: Union of Young Progressives (Samband Ungra Framsóknarmanna)
- Ideology: Agrarianism (Nordic); Liberal conservatism
- Political position: Centre to centre-right
- Nordic affiliation: Centre Group
- Colours: Green
- Seats in Parliament: 5 / 63

Election symbol

Website
- xb.is framsokn.is

The Progressive Party (Icelandic: Framsóknarflokkurinn, FSF) is an agrarian political party in Iceland.

From 30 November 2017 until the 2024 election, the party was a coalition partner in government. The current chairman of the party is Lilja Dögg Alfreðsdóttir who was elected on 15 February 2026.

Throughout most of the 20th century, the party entered into coalitions with parties on both the Left and Right on the Icelandic political spectrum.

Throughout most of the 20th century the party was a centre-left party, with many progressives leading the party, including Hermann Jónasson, Eysteinn Jónsson, Ásgeir Ásgeirsson, Ólafur Jóhannesson and Steingrímur Hermannsson. Steingrímur left office as leader in 1994, and when the new leader Halldór Ásgrímsson entered a coalition with the Independence Party in 1995, many cited the party going from the centre-left to the centre-right. Following Sigmundur Davíð Gunnlaugsson being elected leader in 2009, the party moved to a much more populist based, and left its centre approach. Later leaders since 2016, Sigurður Ingi Jóhannsson, and Lilja Dögg have taken the party back to the centre. In 2026, it was disaffiliated by the Liberal International congress.

== History ==
The Progressive Party was founded to represent Iceland's farmer class, which went from being dominant from settlement to the late 19th century to rapidly dwindling in the early 20th century as a result of industrialization and urbanization. Its primary support still comes from the rural areas of Iceland and its policy roots still stem from its origin as an agrarian party, although it has since come to self-identify as a liberal party, though this is disputed outside of the party. It was founded in 1916 as a merger of two agrarian parties, the Farmers' Party (Bændaflokkur) and the Independent Farmers (Óháðir bændur). In 1956 the party almost agreed to an aborted merger with the Social Democratic Party. Throughout Iceland's history as a self-governing and independent nation, the Progressive Party has most often been the second largest political party in the country. It has often joined government coalitions with either the Independence Party on the centre-right, or with centre-left parties. During the period 1927–1990, the Progressive Party held the prime minister post for thirty years and spent more than two-thirds of the time in coalition government.

=== 1970s ===
Following the 1971 parliamentary election, the Progressive Party formed a government with the People's Alliance and Union of Liberals and Leftists, with Progressive Party chairman Ólafur Jóhannesson serving as prime minister.

The 1974 parliamentary election led to a coalition government of the Independence Party and Progressive Party led by Geir Hallgrímsson.

The 1978 parliamentary election returned Ólafur Jóhannesson to the role of prime minister, leading a coalition containing the Progressive Party, People's Alliance and Social Democratic Party after two months of coalition negotiations.

The snap 1979 parliamentary election caused by the withdrawal of the Social Democrats from government led to a new government being formed in February 1980 by the Independence Party of Prime Minister Gunnar Thoroddsen, Progressive Party and People's Alliance.

=== 1980s ===
The 1983 parliamentary election resulted in Progressive Party leader Steingrímur Hermannsson becoming prime minister in coalition with the Independence Party.

The 1987 parliamentary election in May saw a coalition being formed in July of that year led by Thorsteinn Pálsson of the Independence Party, with the Progressive Party and Social Democratic Party as junior partners. However, in September 1988, a new government was formed by the Progressive Party's Steingrímur Hermannsson with the Social Democrats and People's Alliance.

=== 1990s ===
Following the 1991 parliamentary election, the Progressive Party, with Steingrímur Hermannsson as the outgoing Prime Minister, was in opposition, with the government being formed by Independence Party leader Davíð Oddsson. Steingrímur resigned as leader in 1994, with deputy leader Halldór Ásgrímsson elected leader.

In the 1995 parliamentary election, Davíð Oddsson remained as prime minister, with the Progressive Party returning to government as junior coalition partner to the conservative Independence Party, a coalition which continued after the 1999 election. Halldór's direction to the right cited in the party changing from the centre-left to the centre-right.

=== 2000s ===
In the 2003 parliamentary election, the Progressive Party received 17.2% of the vote and 12 seats in the Althing. On 15 September 2004, Halldór Ásgrímsson of the Progressive Party took over as prime minister from Davíð Oddsson. Halldór Ásgrímsson announced his intention to resign on 5 June 2006 following the party's poor results in the 2006 municipal elections, and low approval ratings. The coalition remained allied with the Independence Party chairman, Geir H. Haarde, as prime minister. The Progressive Party leader Jón Sigurðsson was Minister of Industry and Commerce, until a coalition of the Independence Party and the Social Democratic Alliance took over after the elections in 2007.

In the 2007 parliamentary election, the party dropped five seats to hold only seven seats, down from twelve. The coalition only held a one-seat majority in the Althing, and the Independence Party formed a coalition government with the Social Democratic Alliance with the deal being signed on 22 May, returning the Progressive Party to the opposition. Party leader Jón Sigurðsson did not get a seat in parliament, and resigned and was succeeded by long-time cabinet minister Guðni Ágústsson in 2007. Guðni resigned as leader out of nowhere in November 2008, in the wake of the 2008–2011 Icelandic financial crisis, saying that he was not the right person to lead the party at the moment. Former cabinet minister Valgerður Sverrisdóttir took over as leader, and called a leadership election where she would not be standing. Former news reporter, Sigmundur Davíð Gunnlaugsson was unexpectedly and narrowly elected leader. When a centre-left minority government was formed in February 2009, the Progressive Party agreed to defend it from a no-confidence vote, but did not form part of the governing coalition.

In January 2009, it decided to change its party line on joining the European Union (EU) from being opposed to being in favour of EU accession, but with very strong caveats. The party later changed its policy to one of firm opposition to EU membership. In the wake of the 2008–2011 Icelandic financial crisis, the Progressive Party became more populist. According to political scientist Eiríkur Bergmann, "a completely renewed leadership took over the country’s old agrarian party, the Progressive Party (Framsóknarflokkurinn— PP), which was rapidly retuned in a more populist direction; geared against foreign creditors, international institutions and eventually partly towards anti- Muslim rhetoric, which until then had been absent in the country—there is no significant Muslim minority in Iceland. Under the new post-crisis leader- ship, the Progressive Party thus moved closer to populist parties in Europe." At the time, the party moved completely from the centre and became much more of a plain right wing party.

In the 2009 parliamentary election, the Progressive Party fared somewhat better, securing 14.8% of the vote, and increasing its number of seats from seven to nine. It remained in opposition, however, with a centre-left coalition of the Social Democratic Alliance and the Left-Green Movement continuing to govern with an increased majority.

=== 2010s ===
In the 2013 parliamentary election, the Progressive Party reached second place nationally, winning 24.4% of the vote and 19 seats. Following the election, a centre-right coalition government was formed between the Progressive Party and Independence Party, Sigmundur Davíð Gunnlaugsson of the Progressive Party appointed as prime minister. Sigmundur Davíð was a very polarising figure in Iceland during his tenure as prime minister, and suffered low approval ratings. Sigmundur Davíð was ousted as leader in September 2016 of the party shortly after he was implicated in scandal and ethical quandaries in the Panama Papers release in April 2016, which followed his resignation. Sigurður Ingi Jóhannsson defeated him in the leadership spill election, and took the party to a more grounded centre approach.

The Progressive Party split in 2017 when Sigmundur Davíð created his own party, the Centre Party (Miðflokkurinn). In 2017, the Progressive Party entered a coalition with the Independence Party and the Left Green movement.

=== 2020s ===
After the 2021 parliamentary election, the new government was, just like the previous government, a three-party coalition of the Independence Party, the Progressive Party and the Left-Green Movement, headed by Prime Minister Katrín Jakobsdóttir of Left-Green Movement. In the election, the Progressives suffered a big increase in votes, reaching 17% and coming in second.

Following the fall of the coalition in October 2024, a snap election was called for November. In the election, the Progressives suffered a very big loss, losing eight seats and coming in sixth. During the election, the party took a turn in immigration policies, becoming pro-immigration. Many have called upon Sigurður Ingi to resign as leader.

== Election results ==
Election	Leader	Votes	%	Seats	+/–	Position	Government
1919	Ólafur Briem	3,115	22.19	11 / 40	New	3rd	Opposition
1923	Þorleifur Jónsson	8,062	26.55	15 / 42	▲4	▲2nd	Coalition
1927	Tryggvi Þórhallsson	9,532	29.78	19 / 42	▲4	▲1st	Coalition
1931	Tryggvi Þórhallsson	13,844	35.92	23 / 42	▲4	1st	Majority
1933	Ásgeir Ásgeirsson	8,530	23.91	17 / 42	▼6	▼2nd	Coalition
1934	Hermann Jónasson	11,377	21.91	15 / 49	▼2	2nd	Coalition
1937	Jónas frá Hriflu	14,556	24.92	19 / 49	▲4	▲1st	Minority
1942 (Jul)	Jónas frá Hriflu	16,033	27.58	20 / 49	▲1	1st	Opposition
1942 (Oct)	Jónas frá Hriflu	15,869	26.60	15 / 52	▼5	▼2nd	Opposition
1946	Hermann Jónasson	15,429	23.06	13 / 52	▼2	2nd	Opposition
1949	Hermann Jónasson	17,659	24.45	17 / 52	▲4	2nd	Opposition
1953	Hermann Jónasson	16,959	21.91	16 / 52	▼1	2nd	Coalition
1956	Hermann Jónasson	12,925	15.63	17 / 52	▲1	2nd	Coalition
1959 (Jun)	Hermann Jónasson	23,061	27.20	19 / 52	▲2	2nd	Opposition
1959 (Oct)	Hermann Jónasson	21,882	25.71	17 / 60	▼2	2nd	Opposition
1963	Eysteinn Jónsson	25,217	28.222	19 / 60	▲2	2nd	Opposition
1967	Eysteinn Jónsson	27,029	28.13	18 / 60	▼1	2nd	Opposition
1971	Ólafur Jóhannesson	26,645	25.28	17 / 60	▼1	2nd	Coalition
1974	Ólafur Jóhannesson	28,381	24.87	17 / 60	0	2nd	Coalition
1978	Ólafur Jóhannesson	20,656	16.90	12 / 60	▼5	▼4th	Coalition
1979	Steingrímur Hermannsson	30,861	24.94	17 / 60	▲5	▲2nd	Opposition
1983	Steingrímur Hermannsson	24,754	19.05	14 / 60	▼3	2nd	Coalition
1987	Steingrímur Hermannsson	28,902	18.92	13 / 63	▼1	2nd	Coalition
1991	Steingrímur Hermannsson	29,866	18.93	13 / 63	0	2nd	Opposition
1995	Halldór Ásgrímsson	38,485	23.32	15 / 63	▲2	2nd	Coalition
1999	Halldór Ásgrímsson	30,415	18.35	12 / 63	▼3	▼3rd	Coalition
2003	Halldór Ásgrímsson	32,484	17.73	12 / 63	0	3rd	Coalition
2007	Jón Sigurðsson	21,350	11.72	7 / 63	▼5	▼4th	Opposition
2009	Sigmundur Davíð Gunnlaugsson	27,699	14.80	9 / 63	▲2	4th	Opposition
2013	Sigmundur Davíð Gunnlaugsson	46,173	24.43	19 / 63	▲10	▲2nd	Coalition
2016	Sigurður Ingi Jóhannsson	21,791	11.49	8 / 63	▼11	▼4th	Opposition
2017	Sigurður Ingi Jóhannsson	21,016	10.71	8 / 63	0	4th	Coalition
2021	Sigurður Ingi Jóhannsson	34,501	17.27	13 / 63	▲5	▲2nd	Coalition
2024	Sigurður Ingi Jóhannsson	16,578	7.80	5 / 63	▼8	▼6th	Opposition

== Members of Parliament ==
Until the elections in 2024, the Progressive Party had thirteen members of parliament.

Member of Parliament	Since	Title	Constituency
Sigurður Ingi Jóhannsson	2009	Party Chair Minister of Infrastructure	South
Lilja Dögg Alfreðsdóttir	2016	Party Vice-chair Minister of Culture and Business	Reykjavik South
Ásmundur Einar Daðason	2017	Party Secretary Minister of Education and Children affairs	Reykjavik North
Willum Þór Þórsson	2017	Minister of Health	Southwest
Ingibjörg Isaksen	2021	Leader of the Parliamentary Group	Northeast
Stefán Vagn Stefánsson	2021		Northwest
Lilja Rannveig Sigurgeirsdóttir	2021		Northwest
Halla Signý Kristjánsdóttir	2017		Northwest
Jóhann Friðrik Friðriksson	2021		South
Hafdís Hrönn Hafsteinsdóttir	2021		South
Ágúst Bjarni Garðarsson	2021		Southwest
Líneik Anna Sævarsdóttir	2017		Northeast
Þórarinn Ingi Pétursson	2021		Northeast

== Leadership ==
Nº	Chairman	Took office	Left office	Prime Ministry
1	Ólafur Briem (1851–1925)	1916	1920	
2	Sveinn Ólafsson (1863–1949)	1920	1922	
3	Þorleifur Jónsson (1864–1956)	1922	1928	
4	Tryggvi Þórhallsson (1889–1935)	1928	1932	1927-1932
5	Ásgeir Ásgeirsson (1894–1972)	1932	1933	1932-1934
6	Sigurður Kristinsson (1880–1963)	1933	1934	
7	Jónas Jónsson (1885–1968)	1934	1944	
8	Hermann Jónasson (1896–1976)	1944	1962	1934-1942, 1956-1958
9	Eysteinn Jónsson (1906–1993)	1962	1968	
10	Ólafur Jóhannesson (1913–1984)	1968	1979	1971-1974, 1978-1979
11	Steingrímur Hermannsson (1928–2010)	1979	1994	1983-1987, 1988-1991
12	Halldór Ásgrímsson (1947–2015)	1994	2006	2004-2006
13	Jón Sigurðsson (1946–2021)	2006	2007	
14	Guðni Ágústsson (born 1949)	2007	2008	
15	Valgerður Sverrisdóttir (born 1950)	2008	2009	
16	Sigmundur Davíð Gunnlaugsson (born 1975)	2009	2016	2013-2016
17	Sigurður Ingi Jóhannsson (born 1962)	2016	2026	2016-2017
18	Lilja Dögg Alfreðsdóttir (born 1973)	2026	Present	

=== Members of the party who served as prime minister but not as leader ===
Prime Minister	Took office	Left office
Steingrímur Steinþórsson (1893–1966)	1950	1953

== See also ==
- Independence Party (Iceland)
- Nordic agrarian parties
- Liberalism in Europe
- Liberalism worldwide
- List of liberal parties
