= Women's List =

- Abbreviation: KL
- Founded: 1983
- Dissolved: 2000
- Merged into: Social Democratic Alliance
- Headquarters: Reykjavík
- Ideology: Feminism
- Political position: Centre-left to left-wing

The Women's List or Women's Alliance (Icelandic: Samtök um kvennalista), also called Kvennalistinn (KL), was a feminist political party in Iceland that took part in national politics from 1983 to 1999. The party held three seats in the parliament elected in 1983, six seats in 1987, five seats in 1991 and three seats in 1995.

In 1999, it formed an alliance with three other left wing and centre-left parties called the Social Democratic Alliance, which then merged into a party by that name in 2000. However, about half the members of the Women's List disapproved of this and chose to join the Left-Green Movement instead. Ingibjörg Sólrún Gísladóttir, former leader of the Alliance and former Minister of Foreign Affairs started her political career in the Women's List, and was Mayor of Reykjavík as a member of that party.

== Election results ==
| Election | Votes | % | Seats | +/– | Position | Status |
|---|---|---|---|---|---|---|
| 1983 | 7,125 | 5.5 | 3 / 60 | New | ▲6th | Opposition |
| 1987 | 15,470 | 10.1 | 6 / 63 | ▲3 | 6th | Opposition |
| 1991 | 13,069 | 8.3 | 5 / 63 | ▼1 | ▲5th | Opposition |
| 1995 | 8,031 | 4.9 | 3 / 63 | ▼2 | ▼6th | Opposition |

== Members of Alþingi ==
- Anna Ólafsdóttir Björnsson (1989–1995)
- Danfríður Skarphéðinsdóttir (1987–1991)
- Guðrún Agnarsdóttir (1983–1990)
- Jóna Valgerður Kristjánsdóttir (1991–1995)
- Kristín Ástgeirsdóttir (1991–1999)
- Kristín Einarsdóttir (1987–1995)
- Kristín Halldórsdóttir (1983–1989, 1995–1999)
- Málmfríður Sigurðardóttir (1987–1991)
- Þórhildur Þorleifsdóttir (1987–1991)
- Þórunn Sveinbjarnardóttir (temporary in 1996)
