= Hannibal Valdimarsson =

Icelandic politician (1903–1991)

Hannibal Gísli Valdimarsson (13 January 1903 – 1 September 1991) was an Icelandic politician.

== Parliament ==
He was a member of parliament from 1946 to 1959 for the Social Democratic Party and People's Alliance and then from 1963 to 1974 for the People's Alliance, as an independent and also the Union of Liberals and Leftists (Icelandic: Samtök frjálslyndra og vinstrimanna). He was chairman of the Social Democratic Party 1952–1954, president of Icelandic Labor Unions 1954–1971, as well as the chairman of the Electoral Alliance People's Alliance (Iceland) from 1956 to 1968. Finally he was chairman of Union of Liberals and Leftists from 1969 to 1974. He served as Social and Health Minister 1956–1958 and as Communication and Social minister 1971–1973.

== Family ==
He was the father of Jón Baldvin Hannibalsson, who served as the foreign minister of Iceland, and Arnór Hannibalsson, a philosopher.
