= Brúnastaðir =

- Farm
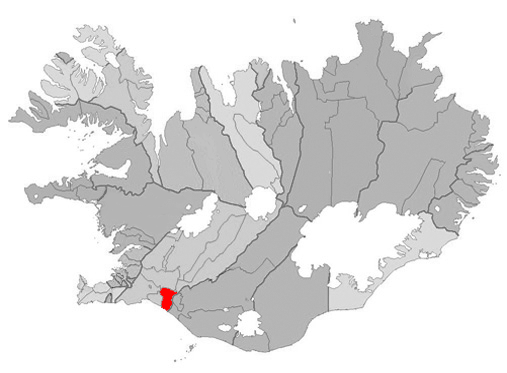
- Location of the Municipality of Flóahreppur

- Location of Brúnastaðir in Iceland
- Coordinates: 63°58′N 20°46′W
- Country: Iceland
- Constituency: South Constituency
- Region: Southern Region
- Municipality: Flóahreppur
- Time zone: UTC+0 (GMT)

Brúnastaðir (Icelandic pronunciation: [ˈpruːnaˌstaːðɪr̥]) is a farm in southern Iceland, located in the municipality of Flóahreppur.

Brúnastaðir is the birthplace of two politicians, August Þorvaldsson and his son Guðni Ágústsson, Progressive Party MPs.
