= Zoega =

Zoega or Zoëga is a surname. Notable people with the surname include:

- Björn Zoëga (born 1964), Icelandic orthopedic surgeon
- Georg Zoëga (1755–1809), Danish archaeologist and numismatist, brother of Johan
- Gylfi Zoega (born 1963), Icelandic economist
- Johan Zoëga (1742–1788), Danish entomologist and botanist
