= Guðbrandur =

Guðbrandur is an Icelandic masculine given name. Notable people with the name include:

- Guðbrandur Einarsson (born 1958), Icelandic politician
- Guðbrandur Vigfússon (1827–1889), Icelandic scholar
- Guðbrandur Þorláksson (1542–1627), Icelandic bishop
