= Iceland in the Eurovision Song Contest 1988 =

- Eurovision Song Contest 1988
- Participating broadcaster: Ríkisútvarpið (RÚV)
- Country: Iceland
- Selection process: Söngvakeppni Sjónvarpsins 1988
- Selection date: 21 March 1988

Competing entry
- Song: "Þú og þeir (Sókrates)"
- Artist: Beathoven
- Songwriter: Sverrir Stormsker

Placement
- Final result: 16th, 20 points

Participation chronology

Iceland was represented at the Eurovision Song Contest 1988 with the song "Þú og þeir (Sókrates)", written by Sverrir Stormsker, and performed by Beathoven. The Icelandic participating broadcaster, Ríkisútvarpið (RÚV), selected its entry through Söngvakeppni Sjónvarpsins 1988.

== Before Eurovision ==
=== Söngvakeppni Sjónvarpsins 1988 ===
Ríkisútvarpið (RÚV) held the national final on 21 March 1988 at its studios in Reykjavík, hosted by Hermann Gunnarsson. 10 songs competed, which were all shown as pre-recorded video clips, and the winner was chosen by the votes of 8 regional juries.

Final – 21 March 1988
| R/O | Artist | Song | Points | Place |
|---|---|---|---|---|
| 1 | Pálmi Gunnarsson | "Eitt vor" | 12 | 10 |
| 2 | Grétar Örvarsson and Gígja Sigurðardóttir | "Í fyrrasumar" | 34 | 7 |
| 3 | Eyjólfur Kristjánsson and Ingi Gunnar Jóhannsson | "Ástarævintýri (á vetrarbraut)" | 63 | 2 |
| 4 | Magnús Kjartansson and Margrét G. Magnúsdóttir | "Sólarsamba" | 37 | 6 |
| 5 | Bjarni Arason | "Aftur og aftur" | 17 | 9 |
| 6 | Eyjólfur Kristjánsson and Sigrún Waage | "Mánaskin" | 61 | 3 |
| 7 | Stefán Hilmarsson | "Látum sönginn hljóma" | 57 | 4 |
| 8 | Sverrir Stormsker and Stefán Hilmarsson | "Þú og þeir" | 96 | 1 |
| 9 | Björgvin Halldórsson and Edda Borg Ólafsdóttir | "Í tangó" | 55 | 5 |
| 10 | Guðrún Gunnarsdóttir | "Dag eftir dag" | 32 | 8 |

Detailed Regional Jury Votes
| R/O | Song | West | Westfjords | Northwest | Northeast | East | South | Reykjanes | Reykjavík | Total |
|---|---|---|---|---|---|---|---|---|---|---|
| 1 | "Eitt vor" | 2 | 1 | 1 | 2 | 1 | 1 | 2 | 2 | 12 |
| 2 | "Í fyrrasumar" | 1 | 10 | 3 | 3 | 5 | 3 | 3 | 6 | 34 |
| 3 | "Ástarævintýri" | 10 | 7 | 7 | 7 | 10 | 10 | 4 | 8 | 63 |
| 4 | "Sólarsamba" | 5 | 5 | 5 | 4 | 3 | 6 | 5 | 4 | 37 |
| 5 | "Aftur og aftur" | 3 | 3 | 2 | 1 | 2 | 4 | 1 | 1 | 17 |
| 6 | "Mánaskin" | 6 | 8 | 8 | 10 | 8 | 7 | 7 | 7 | 61 |
| 7 | "Látum sönginn hljóma" | 7 | 6 | 10 | 8 | 7 | 8 | 6 | 5 | 57 |
| 8 | "Þú og þeir" | 12 | 12 | 12 | 12 | 12 | 12 | 12 | 12 | 96 |
| 9 | "Í tangó" | 8 | 4 | 6 | 6 | 6 | 5 | 10 | 10 | 55 |
| 10 | "Dag eftir dag" | 4 | 2 | 4 | 5 | 4 | 2 | 8 | 3 | 32 |

== At Eurovision ==
The contest was broadcast on Sjónvarpið and on radio station Rás 1 (both with commentary by Hermann Gunnarsson).

Stormsker and Hilmarsson, now as Beathoven, performed first on the night of the contest, held in Dublin, Ireland, preceding Sweden. Iceland received 20 points, placing 16th of 21 competing countries. The Icelandic jury awarded its 12 points to Yugoslavia.

The members of the Icelandic jury included Árni Gunnarsson, Ásgeir Guðnason, Davíð Sveinsson, Elín Þóra Stefánsdóttir, Ellý Þorðardóttir, Erla Björk Jónasdóttir, Guðrún Kristmannsdóttir, Hólmfríður Jónsdóttir, Jónas Engilbertsson, Jónína Bachmann, Kjartan Þor Kjartansson, Ólafur Egilsson, Sigrún Kristjánsdóttir, Sigurður Fanndal, Sigurður Ægisson, and Þórdís Garðarsdóttir.

=== Voting ===
Points awarded to Iceland
| Score | Country |
|---|---|
| 12 points | |
| 10 points | |
| 8 points | Portugal |
| 7 points | |
| 6 points | |
| 5 points | |
| 4 points | Denmark; Netherlands |
| 3 points | |
| 2 points | France |
| 1 point | Italy; Sweden |

Points awarded by Iceland
| Score | Country |
|---|---|
| 12 points | Yugoslavia |
| 10 points | Denmark |
| 8 points | Germany |
| 7 points | Switzerland |
| 6 points | Israel |
| 5 points | Norway |
| 4 points | Luxembourg |
| 3 points | Sweden |
| 2 points | Spain |
| 1 point | United Kingdom |
