= 2024 Icelandic presidential election =

- 1 June 2024
- Turnout: 80.78%
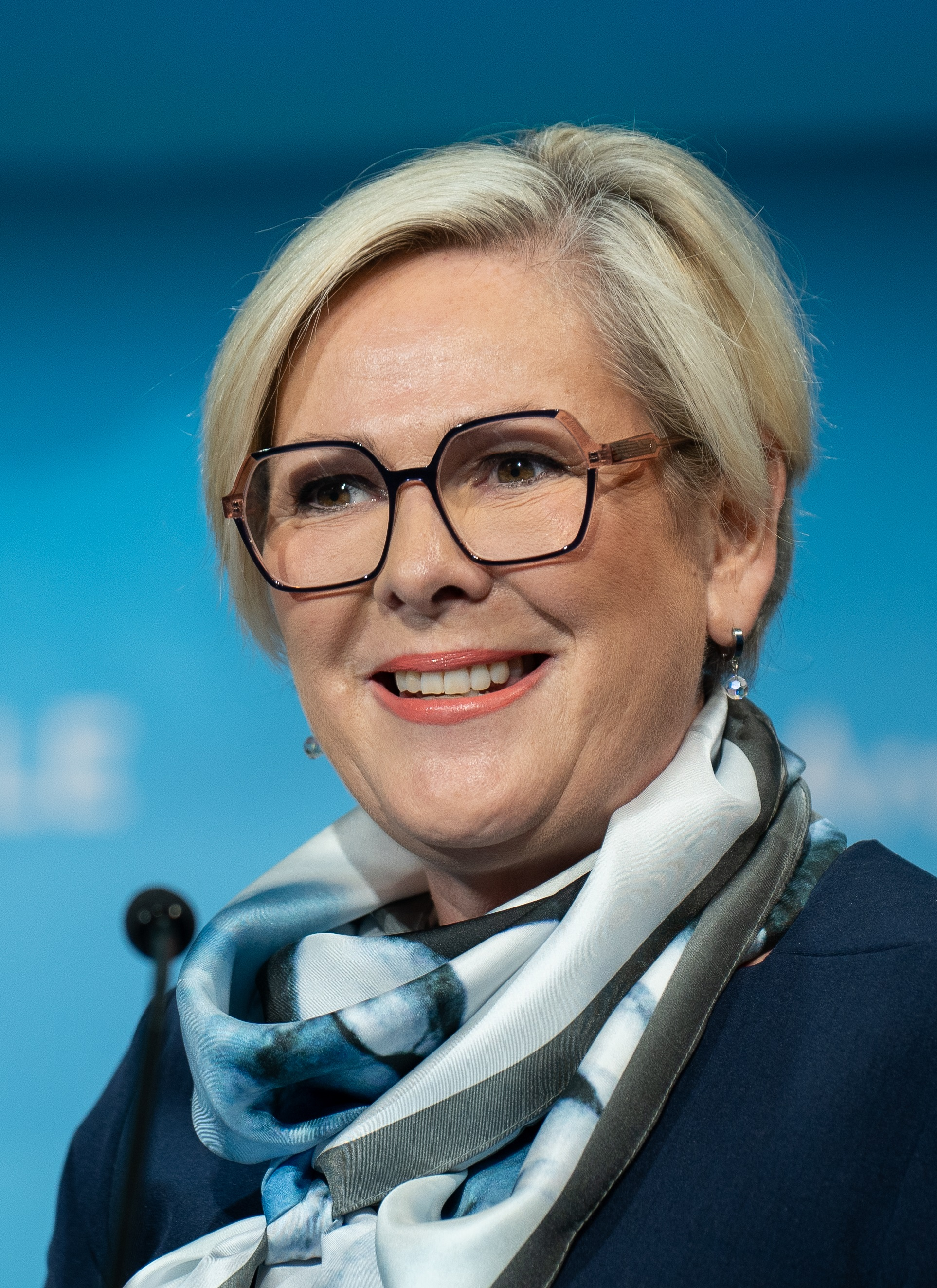

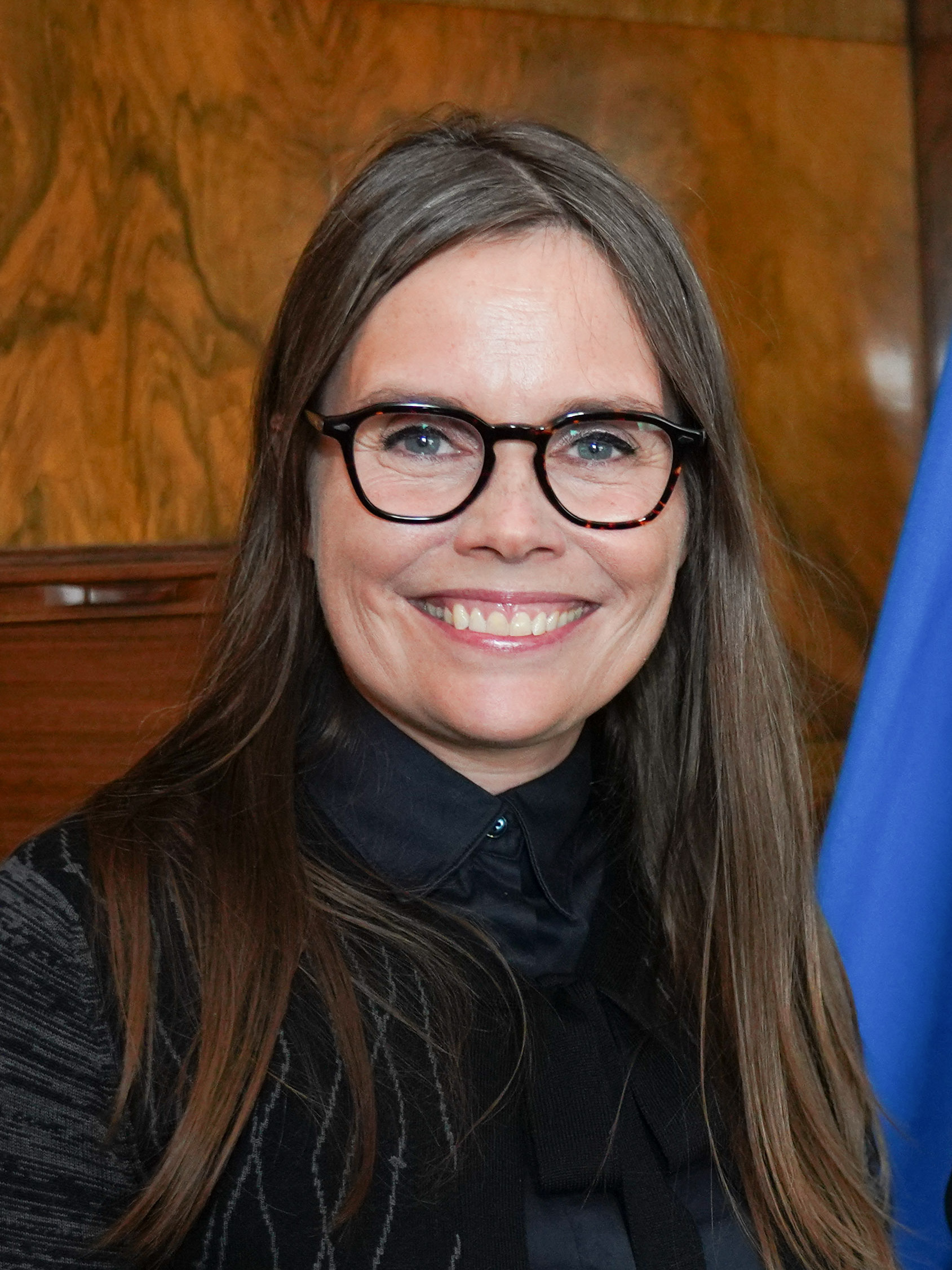

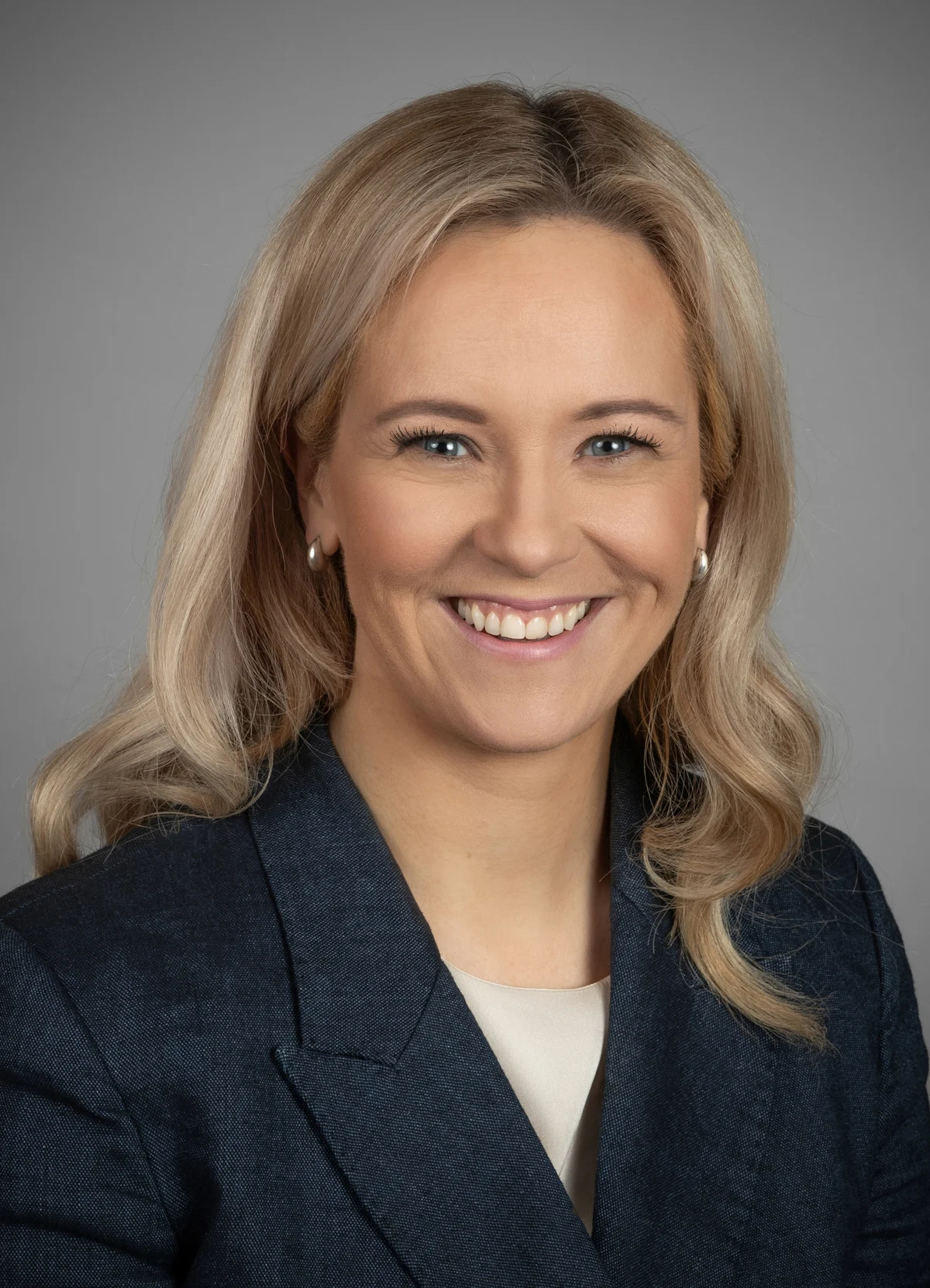

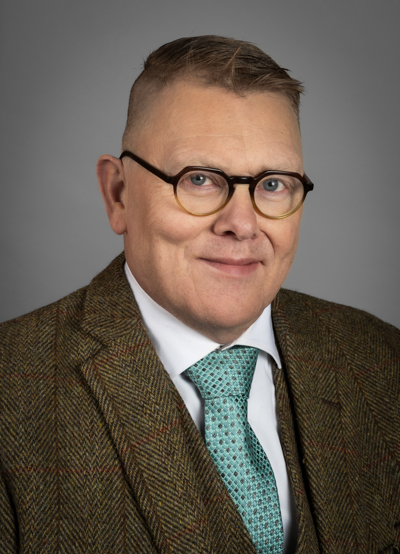
| Candidate | Halla Tómasdóttir | Katrín Jakobsdóttir | Halla Hrund Logadóttir |
| Popular vote | 73,184 | 53,980 | 33,601 |
| Percentage | 34.15% | 25.19% | 15.68% |
| Candidate | Jón Gnarr | Baldur Þórhallsson | Arnar Þór Jónsson |
| Popular vote | 21,634 | 18,030 | 10,811 |
| Percentage | 10.09% | 8.41% | 5.08% |
President before election
Guðni Th. Jóhannesson
Elected President
Halla Tómasdóttir

Presidential elections were held in Iceland on 1 June 2024. Incumbent president Guðni Th. Jóhannesson announced that he would not seek a third term. Entrepreneur Halla Tómasdóttir was elected as his successor, and took office on 1 August.

== Background ==
The previous presidential elections on 27 June 2020 saw incumbent president Guðni Th. Jóhannesson re-elected for a second four-year term with 92% of the vote, over Guðmundur Franklín Jónsson. The office of President is not term-limited; however, despite being eligible to serve a third term, Guðni announced in his New Year's address to the Icelandic people on 1 January 2024 that he would not stand for re-election again. Guðni got several challenge to run for re-election after he announce he will not seek re-election but he decided against it.

== Electoral system ==
The President of Iceland is directly elected by first-past-the-post voting, with a simple plurality of votes needed to win. Candidates must be Icelandic citizens and at least 35 years of age on election day.

On election day polling stations opened at 09:00 and ran until 22:00.

== Candidates ==
Prospective presidential candidates had until 26 April 2024 to collect more than 1,500 voter signatures to secure ballot access. Eighty candidates sought voter signatures by that date. The following individuals have received media attention for their potential candidacy for the position of president. On 29 April 2024, the National Electoral Commission announced which candidates had secured ballot access. Katrín Jakobsdóttir was seen as frontrunner in the election but Halla Tómasdóttir had a late surge to claim victory.

=== Confirmed candidates ===
| Candidate | | Office(s) | Campaign logo | Details |
| Name (Age) | Image | Office(s) | Campaign logo | Details |
|---|---|---|---|---|
| Arnar Þór Jónsson (53) | | Former Deputy MP for the Independence Party (2021–2024) | | Lawyer and former judge who holds the right to speak before the Supreme Court of Iceland. He resigned his seat in the Althing and his membership with the Independence Party to run for President. |
| Ásdís Rán Gunnarsdóttir (44) | | None | | Model and entrepreneur. She worked as a television producer in the 1990s. |
| Ástþór Magnússon (70) | | None | | Businessman, activist, and perennial candidate, having run for President of Iceland in 1996, 2004, 2012, and 2016 — he had planned to run in 2000, but failed to get the necessary qualifying signatures. He is known for his Pro-Russian views. |
| Baldur Þórhallsson (56) | | Former Deputy MP for the Social Democratic Alliance (2009–2013) | | Political science professor at the University of Iceland. He was previously a deputy member of the Althing for the Social Democratic Alliance. |
| Eiríkur Ingi Jóhannsson (47) | Eiríkur Ingi Jóhannsson | None | | Fisherman who survived a sea disaster in 2012. |
| Halla Hrund Logadóttir (43) | Halla Hrund Logadóttir | Director of Energy Affairs at Orkustofnun (since 2021) | Logo of Halla Hrund Logadóttir | Director of Energy Affairs at the Icelandic Energy Agency, the first woman to hold the position. Also an adjunct professor at Harvard University in the United States. |
| Halla Tómasdóttir (55) | Halla Tómasdóttir | None | Logo of Halla Tómasdóttir | Businessperson who has been CEO of The B Team since 2018. She finished as runner-up to Guðni Th. Jóhannesson in the 2016 presidential election. |
| Helga Þórisdóttir (55) | | Data Protection Commissioner | | Data Protection Commissioner and former prosecutor. |
| Jón Gnarr (57) | Jón Gnarr | 20th Mayor of Reykjavík (2010–2014) Other offices: Campaign manager for the Social Democratic Alliance at the 2017 Althing election | Logo of Jón Gnarr | Actor and comedian who served one term as Mayor of Reykjavík for the Best Party, where his election and tenure in office made international headlines. He joined the Social Democratic Alliance in 2017. |
| Katrín Jakobsdóttir (48) | Katrín Jakobsdóttir | 28th Prime Minister of Iceland (2017–2024) Other offices: Chair of the Left-Green Movement (2013–2024); Minister of Education, Science and Culture (2009–2013); MP for the Left-Green Movement (2007–2024) | Logo of Katrín Jakobsdóttir | Former Prime Minister of Iceland, the first member of the Left-Green Movement to hold that position, overseeing a coalition government including her party, the Independence Party, and the Progressive Party. She was a member of the Althing from 2007 to 2024, and was chair of her party from 2013 to 2024. She resigned as chair of the Left-Green Movement, as a member of the Althing, and as Prime Minister to run for President. |
| Steinunn Ólína Þorsteinsdóttir (54) | | None | | Actress, TV show host, producer and writer. |
| Viktor Traustason (35) | | None | | Economist. His endorsement list was initially declared invalid, but later corrected and confirmed on 2 May. |

=== Withdrew or failed to get ballot access ===
These candidates failed to collect enough signatures before the deadline expired.

- Agnieszka Sokolowska, project manager at the Capital Region Fire Service.
- Angela Snæfellsjökuls Rawlings, artist-researcher, on behalf of "Snæfellsjökul fyrir forseta", a geocultural intervention to nominate the non-human candidate Snæfellsjökull.
- Axel Pétur Axelsson, conspiracy theorist
- Guðbergur Guðbergsson, real estate agent and former stunt man
- Guðmundur Felix Grétarsson, former electrician and the world's first double-arm and shoulder transplant receiver
- Húni Húnfjörð, business administrator, teacher and former basketball player
- Kári Vilmundarson Hansen, disc jockey. Endorsement list declared invalid on 29 April.
- Margrét Friðriksdóttir, editor. Withdrew on 28 March after seeking voter signatures for five days.
- Sigríður Hrund Pétursdóttir, investor. Declared on 12 January and Withdrew on 26 April.
- Tómas Logi Hallgrímsson, rescue worker. Declared on 5 January and withdrew on 20 March (endorsed Baldur Þórhallsson)

=== Declined ===
- Alma Möller, Director of Health
- Andri Snær Magnason, writer and a candidate in the 2016 presidential election
- Björgvin Páll Gústavsson, handball player
- Björn Zoëga, CEO Karolinska University Hospital
- Dagur B. Eggertsson, former Mayor of Reykjavík
- Guðmundur Franklín Jónsson, businessman and a candidate in the 2020 presidential election
- Guðni Th. Jóhannesson, President of Iceland from 2016 to 2024
- Gylfi Þór Þorsteinsson, team manager of the Icelandic Red Cross's fundraising and promotion department
- Ingibjörg Sólrún Gísladóttir, former leader of the Social Democratic Alliance, Minister for Foreign Affairs, and Mayor of Reykjavík
- Jakob Frímann Magnússon, musical artist and MP for the People’s Party (endorsed Katrín Jakobsdóttir)
- Magnús Geir Þórðarson, artistic director of the National Theatre of Iceland
- Ólafur Jóhann Ólafsson, businessman and writer
- Páll Pálsson, real estate agent
- Róbert Spanó, former President of the European Court of Human Rights
- Víðir Reynisson, police officer and the Chief superintendent of the Office of the National Commissioner of the Police
- Þorgrímur Þráinsson, writer
- Þórólfur Guðnason, doctor who served as the Chief Epidemiologist of the Icelandic Directorate of Health
- Þóra Arnórsdóttir, documentary film maker, media personality, and a candidate in the 2012 presidential election

== Campaign issues ==
Presidential debates have featured Iceland's membership in NATO, military aid for Ukraine, the possible sale of the state energy firm Landsvirkjun and the use of veto powers by the Presidency. Questions were also raised on whether Katrín Jakobsdóttir's background as a politician and prime minister would affect her tenure in office, to which she said that she "can rise above party politics". Halla Tómasdóttir ran her campaign on issues such as the effects of social media on the mental health of youth, tourism development and the role of artificial intelligence.

== Opinion polls ==
Local regression of the main candidates before the 2024 election.

| Polling firm | Fieldwork date | | | | | | | | | | | | | |
| Polling firm | Fieldwork date | Arnar Þór Jónsson | Ásdís Rán Gunnarsdóttir | Ástþór Magnússon | Baldur Þórhallsson | Eiríkur Ingi Jóhannsson | Halla Hrund Logadóttir | Halla Tómasdóttir | Helga Þórisdóttir | Jón Gnarr | Katrín Jakobsdóttir | Steinunn Ólína Þorsteinsdóttir | Viktor Traustason | Others/ Undecided |
|---|---|---|---|---|---|---|---|---|---|---|---|---|---|---|
| Maskína | 31 May 2024 | 4.4 | 0.5 | 0.2 | 12.0 | 0.2 | 18.0 | 30.2 | 0.2 | 9.5 | 23.0 | 1.0 | 0.6 | – |
| Gallup | 24–31 May 2024 | 6.2 | 0.2 | 0.4 | 14.6 | 0.1 | 19.0 | 23.9 | 0.1 | 8.4 | 25.6 | 0.9 | 0.5 | – |
| Prósent | 27–30 May 2024 | 6.1 | 0.5 | 0.1 | 14.6 | – | 22.0 | 23.5 | 0.4 | 9.0 | 22.2 | 1.1 | 0.5 | – |
| Maskína | 27–30 May 2024 | 5.0 | 0.4 | 0.4 | 15.4 | 0.1 | 18.4 | 24.1 | 0.3 | 9.9 | 24.1 | 1.5 | 0.6 | – |
| Háskóli Íslands | 22–30 May 2024 | 7.1 | 0.8 | 0.4 | 16.1 | 0.2 | 18.4 | 18.5 | 0.2 | 9.9 | 26.3 | 1.5 | 0.6 | – |
| Prósent | 21–26 May 2024 | 6.4 | 0.6 | 0.3 | 16.9 | 0.1 | 21.0 | 20.2 | 0.7 | 11.4 | 20.1 | 1.5 | 0.8 | – |
| Gallup | 17–23 May 2024 | 7 | – | – | 18 | – | 19 | 17 | – | 9 | 27 | 1 | – | 2 |
| Maskína | 22–23 May 2024 | 5.4 | 0.3 | 0.6 | 18.2 | 0.1 | 16.6 | 18.6 | 0.5 | 12.4 | 25.7 | 0.9 | 0.7 | – |
| Prósent | 14–19 May 2024 | 6.0 | 0.9 | 1.0 | 18.2 | 0.1 | 19.7 | 16.2 | 0.2 | 13.4 | 22.1 | 1.3 | 1.0 | – |
| Gallup | 10–16 May 2024 | 6 | – | – | 19 | – | 21 | 15 | – | 11 | 23 | 1 | – | 4 |
| Maskína | 13–16 May 2024 | 5.2 | 0.4 | 0.7 | 16.2 | 0.1 | 21.8 | 14.9 | 0.2 | 12.6 | 26.1 | 1.1 | 0.7 | – |
| Prósent | 7–12 May 2024 | 5.7 | 0.4 | 0.7 | 17.9 | 0.1 | 26.0 | 12.5 | 0.5 | 13.8 | 19.2 | 1.8 | 1.5 | – |
| Gallup | 3–9 May 2024 | 6 | – | – | 18 | – | 25 | 11 | – | 10 | 25 | 1 | 2 | 1 |
| Maskína | 30 Apr–8 May 2024 | 4.2 | 1.2 | 0.4 | 18.9 | 0.1 | 29.7 | 5.4 | 0.8 | 11.2 | 26.7 | 1.2 | 0.6 | – |
| EMC | 2–8 May 2024 | 4.5 | 0.6 | 0.3 | 21.8 | 0.3 | 29.1 | 4.1 | 0.3 | 13.0 | 22.9 | 1.1 | 2.0 | – |
| Prósent | 30 Apr–5 May 2024 | 4.3 | 1.0 | 1.1 | 20.4 | 0.2 | 29.7 | 5.1 | 0.3 | 14.7 | 21.3 | 1.9 | – | – |
| Maskína | 22 Apr–3 May 2024 | 4.2 | 1.5 | 0.3 | 19.9 | 0.1 | 29.4 | 3.7 | 0.4 | 12.9 | 26.8 | 0.9 | – | – |
| Gallup | 26 Apr–2 May 2024 | 3 | – | – | 19 | – | 36 | 4 | – | 10 | 23 | 2 | – | 2 |
| Háskóli Íslands | 22–30 Apr 2024 | 4.1 | 0.5 | 0.9 | 23.6 | 0.1 | 27.6 | 4.5 | 0.2 | 7.4 | 29.9 | 1.3 | – | – |
| Prósent | 23–28 Apr 2024 | 2.7 | 1.9 | 0.5 | 25.0 | – | 28.5 | 3.9 | 0.2 | 16.0 | 18.0 | 2.3 | – | – |
| Maskína | 22–26 Apr 2024 | 3.3 | 1.5 | 0.5 | 21.2 | – | 26.2 | 4.1 | 0.2 | 15.2 | 25.4 | 1.2 | – | 0.6 |
| Gallup | 17–22 Apr 2024 | 3 | – | – | 28 | – | 16 | 4 | – | 15 | 31 | 1 | – | 1 |
| Prósent | 16–21 Apr 2024 | 2.8 | 1.1 | 1.1 | 27.2 | – | 18.0 | 5.8 | 0.1 | 17.2 | 23.8 | 2.1 | – | 0.9 |
| Maskína | 12–16 Apr 2024 | 3.8 | 1.3 | 0.9 | 24.0 | – | 10.5 | 6.7 | – | 18.9 | 31.4 | 1.8 | – | 0.6 |
| Prósent | 9–14 Apr 2024 | 2.9 | 0.8 | 0.4 | 25.8 | – | 10.6 | 4.3 | 0.4 | 16.8 | 22.1 | 2.9 | – | 10.5 |
| Gallup | 5–11 Apr 2024 | 4 | 2 | 1 | 26 | – | 4 | 7 | – | 18 | 30 | 2 | – | 6 |
| Maskína | 5–8 Apr 2024 | 3.2 | – | 0.6 | 26.7 | – | 5.7 | 7.3 | 0.4 | 19.6 | 32.9 | 1.9 | – | 1.7 |
| Prósent | 20–27 Mar 2024 | 5 | 4 | 2 | 37 | – | – | 15 | – | – | – | – | – | 38 |

== Results ==
Votes received by candidate

| Candidate | Votes | % |
|---|---|---|
| Halla Tómasdóttir | 73,184 | 34.15 |
| Katrín Jakobsdóttir | 53,980 | 25.19 |
| Halla Hrund Logadóttir | 33,601 | 15.68 |
| Jón Gnarr | 21,634 | 10.09 |
| Baldur Þórhallsson | 18,030 | 8.41 |
| Arnar Þór Jónsson | 10,881 | 5.08 |
| Steinunn Ólína Þorsteinsdóttir | 1,383 | 0.65 |
| Ástþór Magnússon | 465 | 0.22 |
| Ásdís Rán Gunnarsdóttir | 394 | 0.18 |
| Viktor Traustason | 392 | 0.18 |
| Helga Þórisdóttir | 275 | 0.13 |
| Eiríkur Ingi Jóhannsson | 101 | 0.05 |
| Total | 214,320 | 100.00 |
| Valid votes | 214,320 | 99.39 |
| Invalid votes | 512 | 0.24 |
| Blank votes | 803 | 0.37 |
| Total votes | 215,635 | 100.00 |
| Registered voters/turnout | 266,741 | 80.84 |
Source: National Electoral Commission

== Reactions ==
After her victory was confirmed, Halla Tómasdóttir was congratulated by runner-up and former prime minister Katrín Jakobsdóttir.

== After the election ==
Parliamentary election were held in Iceland roughly six months after the presidential election and two candidates Jón Gnarr and Halla Hrund Logadóttir were elected to Alþingi in the election and currently serves as MP. Arnar Þór Jónsson ran for Alþingi as well but he was not elected.
