= Garðar Gunnlaugsson =

Icelandic footballer

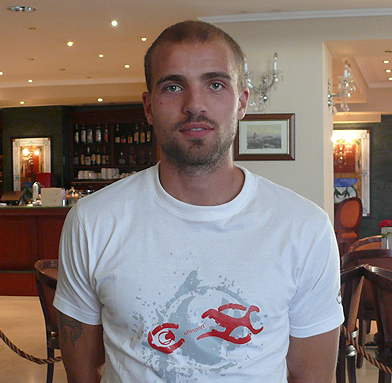

Personal information
- Full name: Garðar Bergmann Gunnlaugsson
- Date of birth: 25 April 1983 (age 43)
- Place of birth: Akranes, Iceland
- Height: 1.83 m (6 ft 0 in)
- Position: Forward

Team information
- Current team: ÍA Akranes
- Number: 32

Youth career
- ÍA Akranes

Senior career*
Years	Team	Apps	(Gls)
2001–2004	ÍA Akranes	37	(5)
2004–2006	Valur	38	(14)
2006	→ Dunfermline (loan)	1	(0)
2007–2008	IFK Norrköping	45	(30)
2008–2010	CSKA Sofia	5	(0)
2010	LASK Linz	5	(1)
2010–2011	SpVgg Unterhaching	20	(3)
2012–2018	ÍA Akranes	129	(60)
2019	Valur	4	(0)
2020–2021	Kári	23	(3)
2022–	ÍA Akranes	2	(0)

International career
1999	Iceland U-17	4	(0)
2001	Iceland U-19	4	(1)
2005	Iceland U-21	4	(2)
2016	Iceland	1	(0)
- * Club domestic league appearances and goals as of 21:03, 13 December 2022 (UTC)

Garðar Bergmann Gunnlaugsson (born 7 September 1983) is an Icelandic footballer who plays for ÍA Akranes in the Úrvalsdeild karla. He is the younger brother of Arnar Gunnlaugsson and Bjarki Gunnlaugsson.

== Club career ==
Garðar was born in Akranes in western Iceland in 1983. He started his football career playing for his local team ÍA Akranes before moving to Valur in 2004. In 2007, he signed with Swedish club IFK Norrköping before moving, in August 2008, to Bulgarian side CSKA Sofia. He signed a three-year contract at Sofia, becoming the first Icelandic footballer to play in the Bulgarian A PFG when he made his debut in a match against PFC Pirin Blagoevgrad.

On 18 January 2010, Garðar officially terminated his contract with CSKA Sofia before signing for Austrian side LASK Linz in February 2010, making his debut for LASK in April due to groin injuries. In July 2010 Garðar signed a 2-year contract with German side SpVgg Unterhaching, but left the club after one year, returning to ÍA Akranes where he had begun his career.

In November 2018, Garðar signed with Valur. In August 2019, he announced that he would miss the rest of the season due to a slipped disc in his lower back and that it was unlikely that he would continue his football career.

In June 2020, Garðar returned to the pitch, after signing with 2. deild karla side Kári. In May 2020, 39-year old Garðar signed with his former club, ÍA Akranes, in the top level men's football league in Iceland.

== International career ==
Garðar has played for Iceland U-19 and U-21 but did not make his debut for the senior team until 13 January 2016 in a friendly against Finland.

== Personal life ==
He was married to model Ásdís Rán Gunnarsdóttir with whom he has a daughter and a son. They divorced in 2012.
