= Sigurður Helgi Pálmason =

Icelandic politician

Member of the Althing
- Incumbent
- Assumed office 2024
- Constituency: South

Personal details
- Born: Reykjavíik
- Party: People's Party

Sigurður Helgi Pálmason is an Icelandic politician from the People's Party. In the 2024 Icelandic parliamentary election he was elected to the Althing. Sigurður is the son of the musician Pálmi Gunnarsson.

== See also ==
- List of members of the Althing, 2024–2028
