= Silja Dögg Gunnarsdóttir =

Icelandic politician (born 1973)

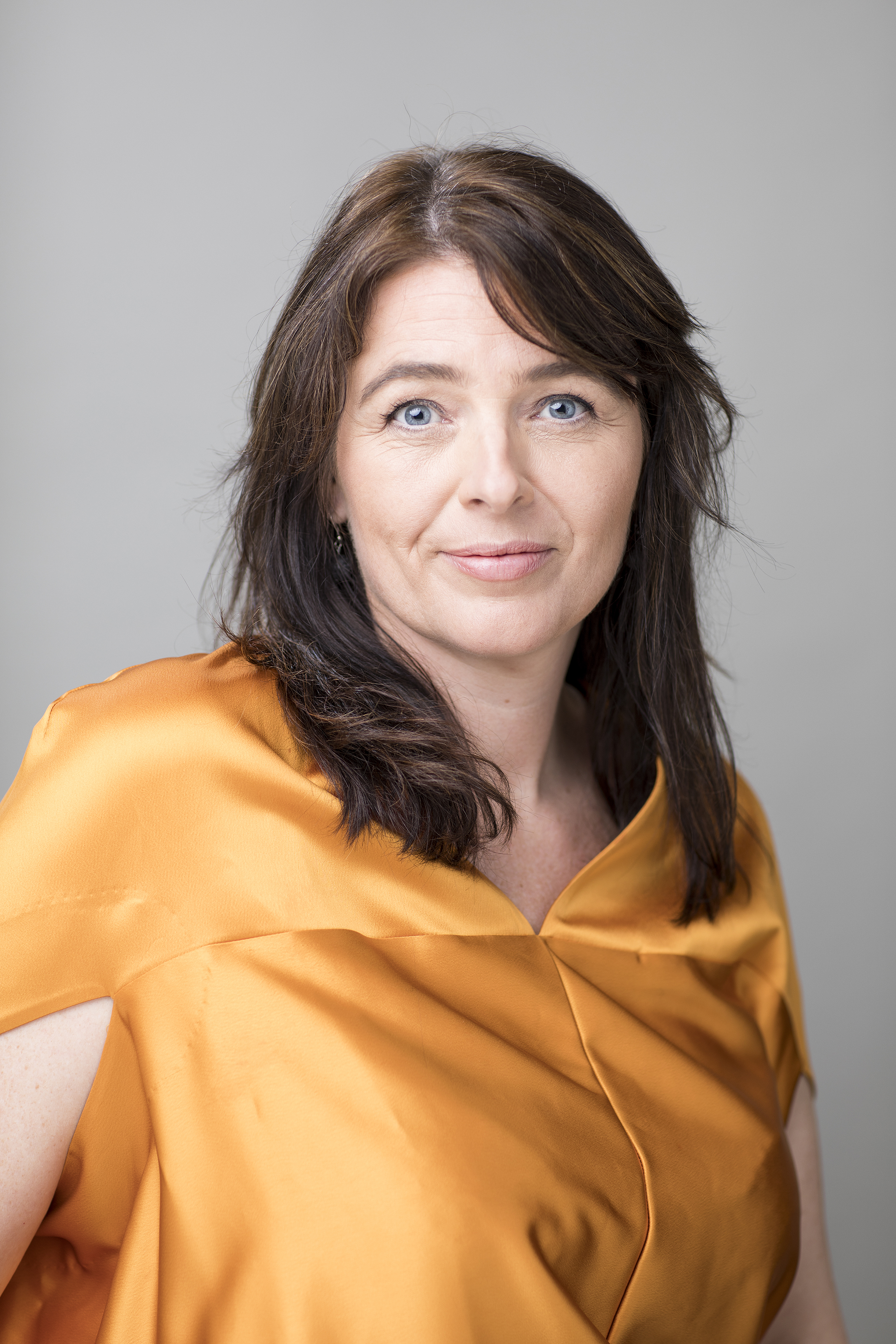

Personal details
- Born: 16 December 1973 (age 52) Reykjavík, Iceland
- Party: Progressive Party
- Spouse: Þröstur Sigmundsson
- Parent(s): Gunnar Örn Guðmundsson (born 1945); Ásdís Friðriksdóttir (born 1949)
- Education: University of Iceland (B.A.); Bifröst University (MIB)

Silja Dögg Gunnarsdóttir (born 16 December 1973) is an Icelandic politician who is a member of the Althing (Iceland's parliament) for the South Constituency since 2013 and has also served as Chairman of the Icelandic Delegation to the Nordic Council since 2017.

At the end of October 2019, Silja Dögg was elected to the position of president of the Nordic Council for the year 2020.
