= Ása Berglind Hjálmarsdóttir =

Icelandic politician (born 1984)

Ása Berglind Hjálmarsdóttir (ÁBH)
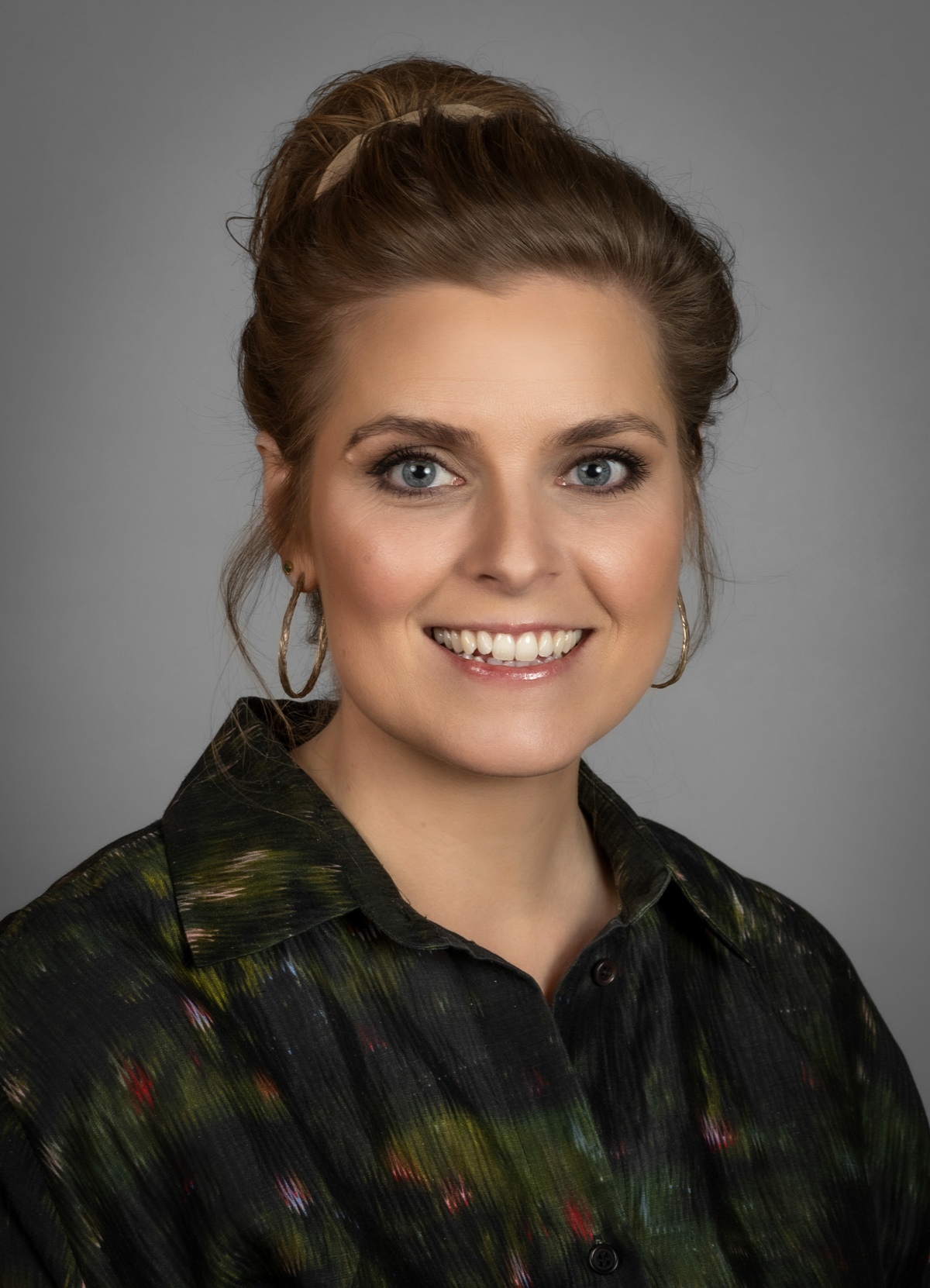

Member of the Althing
- Incumbent
- Assumed office 30 November 2024
- Constituency: South

Personal details
- Born: 30 July 1984 (age 42); Reykjavík, Iceland
- Party: Social Democratic Alliance
- Education: Iceland Academy of the Arts; Bifröst University

Ása Berglind Hjálmarsdóttir (born 30 July 1984) is an Icelandic politician and member of the Althing. A member of the Social Democratic Alliance, she has represented the South constituency since November 2024.

Ása was born on 30 July 1984 in Reykjavík. She grew up in Þorlákshöfn where she was a member of the local lute band and conductor of Tónur og Trix, a senior citizens' music group. She studied violin, piano and trumpet at the Árnesingar Music School. She has a Bachelor of Arts degree in music (2007) and a Master of Arts degree in art education from the Iceland Academy of the Arts, and a Master of Arts degree in cultural management (2021) from Bifröst University.

Ása worked in marketing and as a project manager at the Hendur í höfn restaurant and cultural centre in Þorlákshöfn. She was appointed project manager in the culture department of the municipal council in Ölfus in May 2019. She has been a project manager at the Harpa concert hall and conference centre in Reykjavík since November 2022.

Ása is leader of the Ölfus Residents' Party and was elected to Ölfus municipal council at the 2022 municipal elections. She was elected to the Althing at the 2024 parliamentary election.

Ása has two daughters and a son.
