= South (Althing constituency) =

Constituency of Iceland's national legislature

- Suður
- Constituency for the Althing
- Location of South within Iceland
- Municipality: List: Árborg; Ásahreppur; Bláskógabyggð; Flóahreppur; Grímsnes- og Grafningshreppur; Grindavíkurbær; Hornafjörður; Hrunamannahreppur; Hveragerði; Mýrdalshreppur; Ölfus; Rangárþing eystra; Rangárþing ytra; Reykjanesbær; Skaftárhreppur; Skeiða- og Gnúpverjahreppur; Suðurnesjabær; Vestmannaeyjar; Vogar
- Region: Southern; Southern Peninsula
- Population: 65,009 (2024)
- Electorate: 41,002 (2024)
- Area: 31,797 km^{2} (2018)

Current Constituency
- Created: 2003
- Seats: 9 (2003–present) (Note: Excludes compensatory seats.)
- Member of the Althing: List: Ása Berglind Hjálmarsdóttir (S); Ásthildur Lóa Þórsdóttir (F); Guðbrandur Einarsson (C); Guðrún Hafsteinsdóttir (D); Halla Hrund Logadóttir (B); Karl Gauti Hjaltason (M); Sigurður Helgi Pálmason (F); Sigurður Ingi Jóhannsson (B); Vilhjálmur Árnason (D); Víðir Reynisson (S)
- Created from: List: Eastern; Reykjanes; Southern

South (Icelandic: Suður) is one of the six multi-member constituencies of the Althing, the national legislature of Iceland. The constituency was established in 2003 following the re-organisation of constituencies across Iceland when the Southern constituency was merged with municipalities of Gerðahreppur, Grindavík, Reykjanesbær, Sandgerði and Vatnsleysustrandarhreppur from the Reykjanes constituency and the municipality of Sveitarfélagið Hornafjörður from the Eastern constituency. South consists of the Southern and Southern Peninsula regions. The constituency currently elects nine of the 63 members of the Althing using the open party-list proportional representation electoral system. At the 2024 parliamentary election it had 41,002 registered electors.

== History ==
In September 1997 Prime Minister Davíð Oddsson appointed a committee headed by Friðrik Klemenz Sophusson to review the division of constituencies in Iceland and the organisation of elections. The committee's report was published in October 1998 and recommended, amongst other things, that the number of constituencies be reduced and that they be more equal in population size. The Althing passed an amendment to the constitution in June 1999 which removed the reference to specific eight constituencies contained within Article 31 and instead simply stated that there would be six or seven constituencies and that the Althing would determine the boundaries between the constituencies. The amendment also required that if, following an election to Althing, the number of registered electors per seat (including compensatory seats) in any constituency is less than half of that in another constituency, the National Electoral Commission shall change the allocation of seats so as to reduce the imbalance.

South was one of six constituencies (kjördæmi) established by the "Elections to the Althing Act no. 24/2000" (Lög um kosningar til Alþingis, nr. 24/2000) passed by the Althing in May 2000. The Act initially allocated ten seats to the constituency - nine constituency seats and one compensatory seat.

== Electoral system ==
South currently elects nine of the 63 members of the Althing using the open party-list proportional representation electoral system. Constituency seats are allocated using the D'Hondt method. Compensatory seats (equalisation seas) are calculated based on the national vote and are allocated using the D'Hondt method at the constituency level. Only parties that reach the 5% national threshold compete for compensatory seats.

== Election results ==
=== Summary ===
Election	Left-Green V / U			Social Democrats S			People's F			Pirate P / Þ			Viðreisn C			Progressive B			Independence D			Centre M		
Election	Votes	%	Seats	Votes	%	Seats	Votes	%	Seats	Votes	%	Seats	Votes	%	Seats	Votes	%	Seats	Votes	%	Seats	Votes	%	Seats
2024	421	1.32%	0	5,519	17.34%	2	6,354	19.96%	2	422	1.33%	0	3,571	11.22%	1	3,806	11.96%	1	6,233	19.58%	2	4,322	13.58%	1
2021	2,200	7.40%	0	2,270	7.64%	1	3,837	12.91%	1	1,660	5.59%	0	1,845	6.21%	0	7,111	23.93%	3	7,296	24.55%	3	2,207	7.43%	1
2017	3,321	11.84%	1	2,691	9.59%	1	2,510	8.95%	1	1,985	7.07%	0	871	3.10%	0	5,231	18.64%	2	7,058	25.16%	3	4,000	14.26%	1
2016	2,751	10.18%	1	1,725	6.39%	0	973	3.60%	0	3,458	12.80%	1	1,983	7.34%	1	5,154	19.08%	2	8,509	31.50%	4			
2013	1,582	5.88%	0	2,734	10.17%	1				1,269	4.72%	0				9,265	34.46%	4	7,596	28.25%	4			
2009	4,615	17.11%	1	7,541	27.97%	3										5,390	19.99%	2	7,073	26.23%	3			
2007	2,498	9.85%	1	6,783	26.76%	2										4,745	18.72%	2	9,120	35.97%	4			
2003	1,167	4.66%	0	7,426	29.67%	3										5,934	23.71%	2	7,307	29.19%	3			

(Excludes compensatory seats.)

=== Detailed ===
==== 2020s ====
===== 2024 =====
Results of the 2024 parliamentary election held on 30 November 2024:

Party		Votes	%	Seats		
Party		Votes	%	Con.	Com.	Tot.
People's Party	F	6,354	19.96%	2	0	2
Independence Party	D	6,233	19.58%	2	0	2
Social Democratic Alliance	S	5,519	17.34%	2	0	2
Centre Party	M	4,322	13.58%	1	0	1
Progressive Party	B	3,806	11.96%	1	1	2
Viðreisn	C	3,571	11.22%	1	0	1
Socialist Party of Iceland	J	773	2.43%	0	0	0
Pirate Party	P	422	1.33%	0	0	0
Left-Green Movement	V	421	1.32%	0	0	0
Democratic Party	L	406	1.28%	0	0	0
Valid votes		31,827	100.00%	9	1	10
Blank votes		403	1.25%			
Rejected votes – other		55	0.17%			
Total polled		32,285	78.74%			
Registered electors		41,002				

The following candidates were elected:

- Constituency seats - Ása Berglind Hjálmarsdóttir (S), 4,136.50 votes; Ásthildur Lóa Þórsdóttir (F), 6,339.00 votes; Guðbrandur Einarsson (C), 3,525.00 votes; Guðrún Hafsteinsdóttir (D), 6,207.00 votes; Halla Hrund Logadóttir (B), 3,606.00 votes; Karl Gauti Hjaltason (M), 4,174.33 votes; Sigurður Helgi Pálmason (F), 4,767.50 votes; Vilhjálmur Árnason (D), 4,677.75 votes; and Víðir Reynisson (S), 5,490.50 votes.
- Compensatory seats - Sigurður Ingi Jóhannsson (B), 2,894.50 votes.

===== 2021 =====
Results of the 2021 parliamentary election held on 25 September 2021:

Party		Votes	%	Seats		
Party		Votes	%	Con.	Com.	Tot.
Independence Party	D	7,296	24.55%	3	0	3
Progressive Party	B	7,111	23.93%	3	0	3
People's Party	F	3,837	12.91%	1	0	1
Social Democratic Alliance	S	2,270	7.64%	1	0	1
Centre Party	M	2,207	7.43%	1	0	1
Left-Green Movement	V	2,200	7.40%	0	0	0
Viðreisn	C	1,845	6.21%	0	1	1
Pirate Party	P	1,660	5.59%	0	0	0
Socialist Party of Iceland	J	1,094	3.68%	0	0	0
Liberal Democratic Party	O	193	0.65%	0	0	0
Valid votes		29,713	100.00%	9	1	10
Blank votes		595	1.96%			
Rejected votes – other		73	0.24%			
Total polled		30,381	79.07%			
Registered electors		38,424				

The following candidates were elected:

- Constituency seats - Ásmundur Friðriksson (D), 4,770.50 votes; Ásthildur Lóa Þórsdóttir (F), 3,835.67 votes; Birgir Þórarinsson (M), 2,199.67 votes; Guðrún Hafsteinsdóttir (D), 7,275.33 votes; Hafdís Hrönn Hafsteinsdóttir (B), 4,742.67 votes; Jóhann Friðrik Friðriksson (B), 5,917.17 votes; Oddný G. Harðardóttir (S), 2,259.33 votes; Sigurður Ingi Jóhannsson (B), 7,096.33 votes; and Vilhjálmur Árnason (D), 6,057.17 votes.
- Compensatory seats - Guðbrandur Einarsson (C), 1,835.67 votes.

==== 2010s ====
===== 2017 =====
Results of the 2017 parliamentary election held on 28 October 2017:

Party		Votes	%	Seats		
Party		Votes	%	Con.	Com.	Tot.
Independence Party	D	7,058	25.16%	3	0	3
Progressive Party	B	5,231	18.64%	2	0	2
Centre Party	M	4,000	14.26%	1	0	1
Left-Green Movement	V	3,321	11.84%	1	0	1
Social Democratic Alliance	S	2,691	9.59%	1	0	1
People's Party	F	2,510	8.95%	1	0	1
Pirate Party	P	1,985	7.07%	0	1	1
Viðreisn	C	871	3.10%	0	0	0
Bright Future	A	289	1.03%	0	0	0
Dawn	T	101	0.36%	0	0	0
Valid votes		28,057	100.00%	9	1	10
Blank votes		754	2.61%			
Rejected votes – other		103	0.36%			
Total polled		28,914	80.00%			
Registered electors		36,143				

The following candidates were elected:

- Constituency seats - Ari Trausti Guðmundsson (V), 3,308.00 votes; Ásmundur Friðriksson (D), 5,588.00 votes; Birgir Þórarinsson (M), 3,991.33 votes; Karl Gauti Hjaltason (F), 2,497.67 votes; Oddný G. Harðardóttir (S), 2,650.67 votes; Páll Magnússon (D), 6,917.83 votes; Sigurður Ingi Jóhannsson (B), 5,227.50 votes; Silja Dögg Gunnarsdóttir (B), 3,914.50 votes; Vilhjálmur Árnason (D), 4,723.17 votes.
- Compensatory seats - Smári McCarthy (P), 1,959.00 votes.

===== 2016 =====
Results of the 2016 parliamentary election held on 29 October 2016:

Party		Votes	%	Seats		
Party		Votes	%	Con.	Com.	Tot.
Independence Party	D	8,509	31.50%	4	0	4
Progressive Party	B	5,154	19.08%	2	0	2
Pirate Party	P	3,458	12.80%	1	0	1
Left-Green Movement	V	2,751	10.18%	1	0	1
Viðreisn	C	1,983	7.34%	1	0	1
Social Democratic Alliance	S	1,725	6.39%	0	1	1
Bright Future	A	1,565	5.79%	0	0	0
People's Party	F	973	3.60%	0	0	0
Dawn	T	611	2.26%	0	0	0
Icelandic National Front	E	213	0.79%	0	0	0
People's Front of Iceland	R	74	0.27%	0	0	0
Valid votes		27,016	100.00%	9	1	10
Blank votes		741	2.66%			
Rejected votes – other		71	0.26%			
Total polled		27,828	78.53%			
Registered electors		35,436				

The following candidates were elected:

- Constituency seats - Ari Trausti Guðmundsson (V), 2,742.00 votes; Ásmundur Friðriksson (D), 7,306.25 votes; Jóna Sólveig Elínardóttir (C), 1,978.33 votes; Páll Magnússon (D), 8,444.88 votes; Sigurður Ingi Jóhannsson (B), 5,104.75 votes; Silja Dögg Gunnarsdóttir (B), 3,859.25 votes; Smári McCarthy (P), 3,428.33 votes; Unnur Brá Konráðsdóttir (D), 5,318.25 votes; and Vilhjálmur Árnason (D), 6,390.88 votes.
- Compensatory seats - Oddný G. Harðardóttir (S), 1,721.00 votes.

===== 2013 =====
Results of the 2013 parliamentary election held on 27 April 2013:

Party		Votes	%	Seats		
Party		Votes	%	Con.	Com.	Tot.
Progressive Party	B	9,265	34.46%	4	0	4
Independence Party	D	7,596	28.25%	4	0	4
Social Democratic Alliance	S	2,734	10.17%	1	0	1
Left-Green Movement	V	1,582	5.88%	0	0	0
Pirate Party	Þ	1,269	4.72%	0	0	0
Bright Future	A	1,202	4.47%	0	1	1
Dawn	T	904	3.36%	0	0	0
Households Party	I	786	2.92%	0	0	0
Right-Green People's Party	G	703	2.61%	0	0	0
Iceland Democratic Party	L	431	1.60%	0	0	0
Rainbow	J	412	1.53%	0	0	0
Valid votes		26,884	100.00%	9	1	10
Blank votes		564	2.05%			
Rejected votes – other		83	0.30%			
Total polled		27,531	81.89%			
Registered electors		33,619				

The following candidates were elected:

- Constituency seats - Ásmundur Friðriksson (D), 5,421.0 votes; Haraldur Einarsson (B), 5,783.6 votes; Oddný G. Harðardóttir (S), 2,714.3 votes; Páll Jóhann Pálsson (B), 6,945.6 votes; Ragnheiður Elín Árnadóttir (D), 7,519.9 votes; Sigurður Ingi Jóhannsson (B), 9,256.3 votes; Silja Dögg Gunnarsdóttir (B), 8,099.8 votes; Unnur Brá Konráðsdóttir (D), 6,605.9 votes; and Vilhjálmur Árnason (D), 4,791.9 votes.
- Compensatory seats - Páll Valur Björnsson (A), 1,199.0 votes.

==== 2000s ====
===== 2009 =====
Results of the 2009 parliamentary election held on 25 April 2009:

Party		Votes	%	Seats		
Party		Votes	%	Con.	Com.	Tot.
Social Democratic Alliance	S	7,541	27.97%	3	0	3
Independence Party	D	7,073	26.23%	3	0	3
Progressive Party	B	5,390	19.99%	2	0	2
Left-Green Movement	V	4,615	17.11%	1	0	1
Citizens' Movement	O	1,381	5.12%	0	1	1
Liberal Party	F	838	3.11%	0	0	0
Democracy Movement	P	127	0.47%	0	0	0
Valid votes		26,965	100.00%	9	1	10
Blank votes		790	2.84%			
Rejected votes – other		76	0.27%			
Total polled		27,831	85.68%			
Registered electors		32,482				

The following candidates were elected:

- Constituency seats - Árni Johnsen (D), 4,781.2 votes; Atli Gíslason (V), 4,579.7 votes; Björgvin G. Sigurðsson (S), 6,925.3 votes; Eygló Harðardóttir (B), 3,993.7 votes; Oddný G. Harðardóttir (S), 6,344.0 votes; Ragnheiður Elín Árnadóttir (D), 6,903.7 votes; Róbert Marshall (S), 5,094.3 votes; Sigurður Ingi Jóhannsson (B), 5,363.0 votes; and Unnur Brá Konráðsdóttir (D), 4,897.8 votes.
- Compensatory seats - Margrét Tryggvadóttir (O), 1,374.0 votes.

===== 2007 =====
Results of the 2007 parliamentary election held on 12 May 2007:

Party		Votes	%	Seats		
Party		Votes	%	Con.	Com.	Tot.
Independence Party	D	9,120	35.97%	4	0	4
Social Democratic Alliance	S	6,783	26.76%	2	0	2
Progressive Party	B	4,745	18.72%	2	0	2
Left-Green Movement	V	2,498	9.85%	1	0	1
Liberal Party	F	1,771	6.99%	0	1	1
Icelandic Movement – Living Country	I	435	1.72%	0	0	0
Valid votes		25,352	100.00%	9	1	10
Blank votes		375	1.45%			
Rejected votes – other		62	0.24%			
Total polled		25,789	84.30%			
Registered electors		30,592				

The following candidates were elected:

- Constituency seats - Árni Johnsen (D), 6,284.1 votes; Árni Mathiesen (D), 8.904.2 votes; Atli Gíslason (V), 2,493.3 votes; Bjarni Harðarson (B), 3,554.2 votes; Björgvin G. Sigurðsson (S), 6,737.5 votes; Björk Guðjónsdóttir (D), 5,965.2 votes; Guðni Ágústsson (B), 4,700.0 votes; Kjartan Ólafsson (D), 7,054.2 votes; and Lúðvík Bergvinsson (S), 4,958.0 votes.
- Compensatory seats - Grétar Mar Jónsson (F), 1,755.7 votes.

===== 2003 =====
Results of the 2003 parliamentary election held on 10 May 2003:

Party		Votes	%	Seats		
Party		Votes	%	Con.	Com.	Tot.
Social Democratic Alliance	S	7,426	29.67%	3	1	4
Independence Party	D	7,307	29.19%	3	0	3
Progressive Party	B	5,934	23.71%	2	0	2
Liberal Party	F	2,188	8.74%	1	0	1
Left-Green Movement	U	1,167	4.66%	0	0	0
Independent	T	844	3.37%	0	0	0
New Force	N	166	0.66%	0	0	0
Valid votes		25,032	100.00%	9	1	10
Blank votes		282	1.11%			
Rejected votes – other		29	0.11%			
Total polled		25,343	89.41%			
Registered electors		28,344				

The following candidates were elected:

- Constituency seats - Árni Ragnar Árnason (D), 7,214.5 votes; Björgvin G. Sigurðsson (S), 5,569.5 votes; Drífa Hjartardóttir (D), 5,911.8 votes; Guðjón Hjörleifsson (D), 4,807.8 votes; Guðni Ágústsson (B), 5,905.2 votes; Hjálmar Árnason (B), 4,441.7 votes; Lúðvík Bergvinsson (S), 6,433.0 votes; Magnús Þór Hafsteinsson (F), 2,188.0 votes; and Margrét Frímannsdóttir (S), 7,404.6 votes.
- Compensatory seats - Jón Gunnarsson (S), 4,652.5 votes.
