= Lúðvík Bergvinsson =

Icelandic politician (born 1964)

Lúðvík Bergvinsson (LB)

Member of the Althing
- In office 10 May 2003 – 25 April 2009
- Constituency: South
- In office 8 April 1995 – 10 May 2003
- Constituency: Southern

Personal details
- Born: 29 April 1964 (age 62) Kópavogur, Iceland
- Party: Social Democratic Alliance
- Education: University of Iceland

Lúðvík Bergvinsson (born 29 April 1964) is an Icelandic lawyer, politician and former member of the Althing. A member of the Social Democratic Alliance, he represented the Southern constituency from April 1995 to May 2003 and the South constituency from May 2003 to April 2009.

Lúðvík was born on 29 April 1964 in Kópavogur. He is the son of captain Bergvin Oddsson and María Friðriksdóttir. He and his family moved to Vestmannaeyjar when he was a few months old. Other than the a year he spent in Grindavík following the 1973 eruption of the Eldfell volcano, he spent most of his childhood in Vestmannaeyjar. He received a master's license for operating a 30-tonne vessel in 1980. He graduated from the Western Polytechnic in Akranes in 1985 and received a law degree from the University of Iceland (HÍ) in 1991.

Lúðvík was a bailiff, later sheriff, in Vestmannaeyjar from 1991 to 1994. He was a departmental head at the National Investigation Agency from 1993 to 1994 and chief legal officer at the Ministry of the Environment from 1994 to 1995. He was elected to the Althing at the 1995 parliamentary election. He was chairman of social democratic parliamentary group from June 2007 to April 2009. He did not seek re-election at the 2009 parliamentary election. He was a member of the municipal council in Vestmannaeyjar from 2002 to 2006. In December 2009 Lúðvík, Sigurvin Ólafsson and Þóra Gunnarsdóttir started the Bonafide legal firm in Reykjavík.

In April 2020 the Viðskiptablaðið newspaper published an anonymous opinion piece in the Óðinn column which claimed that Lúðvík had been paid ISK 33 million (US$230,000) by the Icelandic Competition Authority (SE) for his role as an independent expert in the merger of Festi and N1. The piece insinuated that the high figure had been as a result of the friendship between Lúðvík and Ásgeir Einarsson, the deputy director of the Competition Authority. Lúðvík sued the paper's editor Trausta Hafliðason and its publisher Myllusetri ehf for defamation. The District Court in Reykjavík acquitted the defendants in February 2021, stating that the article was covered by the right to freedom of opinion enshrined in the Constitution of Iceland, and ordered Lúðvík to pay the defendants ISK 1.5m for legal costs. In April 2022 the Court of Appeal upheld the district court's verdict and ordered Lúðvík to pay the defendants ISK 1.25m for legal costs. In June 2022 the Supreme Court of Iceland rejected Lúðvík's application for leave to appeal against the Court of Appeal's decision.

Lúðvík and his spouse Þóra Gunnarsdóttir have a daughter and a son. He played football for Íþróttabandalag Vestmannaeyja (ÍBV), Íþróttabandalag Akraness (ÍA), Leiftur and Íþróttafélag Kópavogs (ÍK) between 1983 and 1991.

Electoral history of Lúðvík Bergvinsson
Election	Constituency	Party	Votes	Result
1995 parliamentary	Southern	Social Democratic Party	874	Elected
1999 parliamentary	Southern	Social Democratic Alliance	3,605	Elected
2003 parliamentary	South	Social Democratic Alliance	6,433.0	Elected
2007 parliamentary	South	Social Democratic Alliance	4,958.0	Elected
