= Birgir Þórarinsson =

Icelandic politician (born 1965)

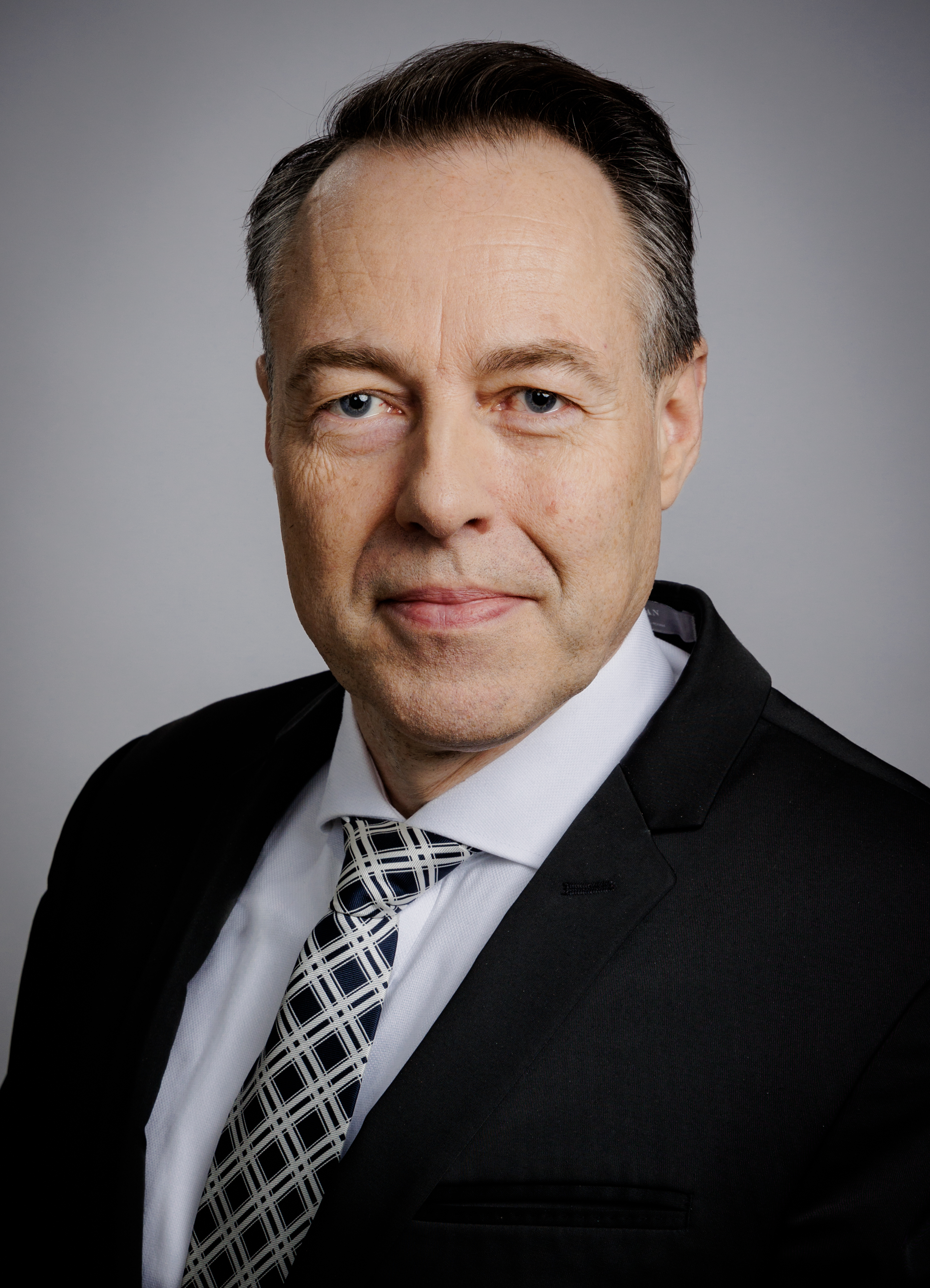
- Birgir Þórarinsson in 2021

Member of the Althing
- In office 2017–2024
- Constituency: South

Personal details
- Born: 23 June 1965 (age 60) Keflavík, Iceland
- Party: Independence Party

Birgir Þórarinsson (born 23 June 1965) is an Icelandic politician from the Independence Party. He was born in Keflavík and represented South constituency in the Parliament of Iceland from 2017 to 2024.
