= Guðmundur Felix Grétarsson =

Icelandic double-arm and shoulders transplant receiver

- Born: 1972 (age 53–54)
- Known for: Receiving double-arm and shoulder transplant in 2021

Guðmundur Felix Grétarsson (born 1972) is a former electrician from Iceland who lost both arms while working on the job. At the age of 48, Guðmundur Felix received the world's first double-arm and shoulder transplant in a procedure led by Professor Jean-Michel Dubernard at the Edouard Herriot Hospital in Lyon, France. The transplant was deemed successful and Guðmundur Felix gained mobility in the transplanted limbs.

In April 2024, he announced his candidacy for the 2024 Icelandic presidential election.

== Injury ==
On January 12, 1998, Guðmundur Felix was working as an electrician in Reykjavík, Iceland. He was working on a set of powerlines when he grabbed one of the wires. 11,000 volts and 100 amperes jumped through his arms, burning them. He fell, breaking his back and neck. After being taken to the hospital, doctors deemed his arms too damaged to be saved. He underwent amputation on both arms followed by multiple surgeries over the next eleven months. In total, Guðmundur Felix underwent 54 surgeries in the first year.

== Double-arm transplant and outcome ==
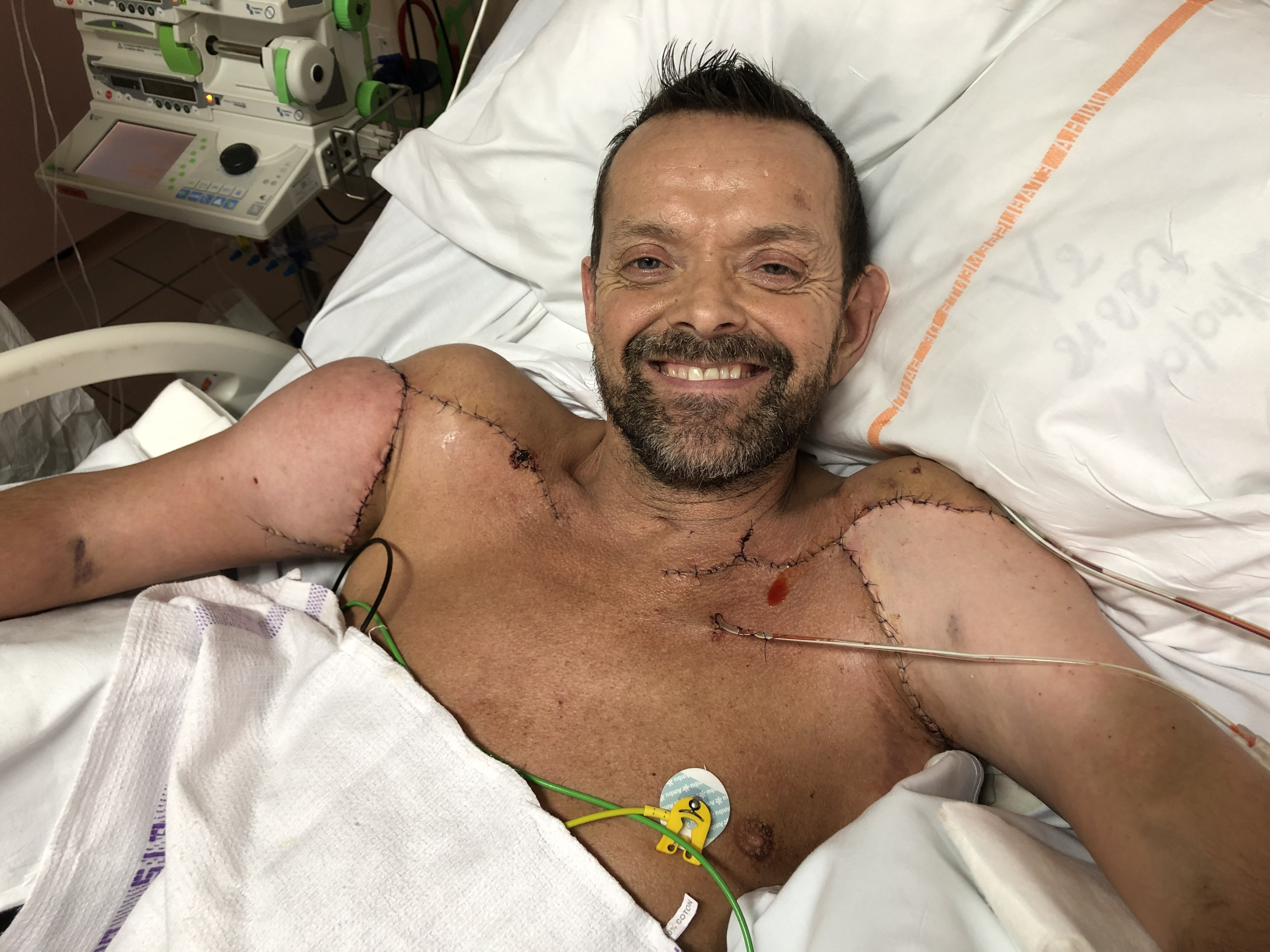
Guðmundur Felix Grétarsson, five days after double arm and shoulder transplant

In 2007, Guðmundur Felix approached a French doctor giving a lecture at an Icelandic university. The doctor agreed to look into his case. Several years later in 2011, he was asked to come to France for further medical testing. The surgery was planned and Guðmundur Felix was placed on the donor list in September 2016. On January 13, 2021, Guðmundur Felix underwent the operation for a double-arm transplant, which lasted 15 hours.

In an interview 17 months post-op on June 10, 2022, Guðmundur Felix appeared on Good Morning Britain to discuss the transplant and the aftermath. He reported having partial touch sensation throughout his entire arm. It was stated, shown, and demonstrated that he was able to lift light objects, hold hands, use a broom, hug, shake hands, shower and dress himself, and walk his dog.
