= Hraungerðiskirkja =

Lutheran church in Flóahreppur, Iceland

Coordinates: 63.9489°N 20.8210°W

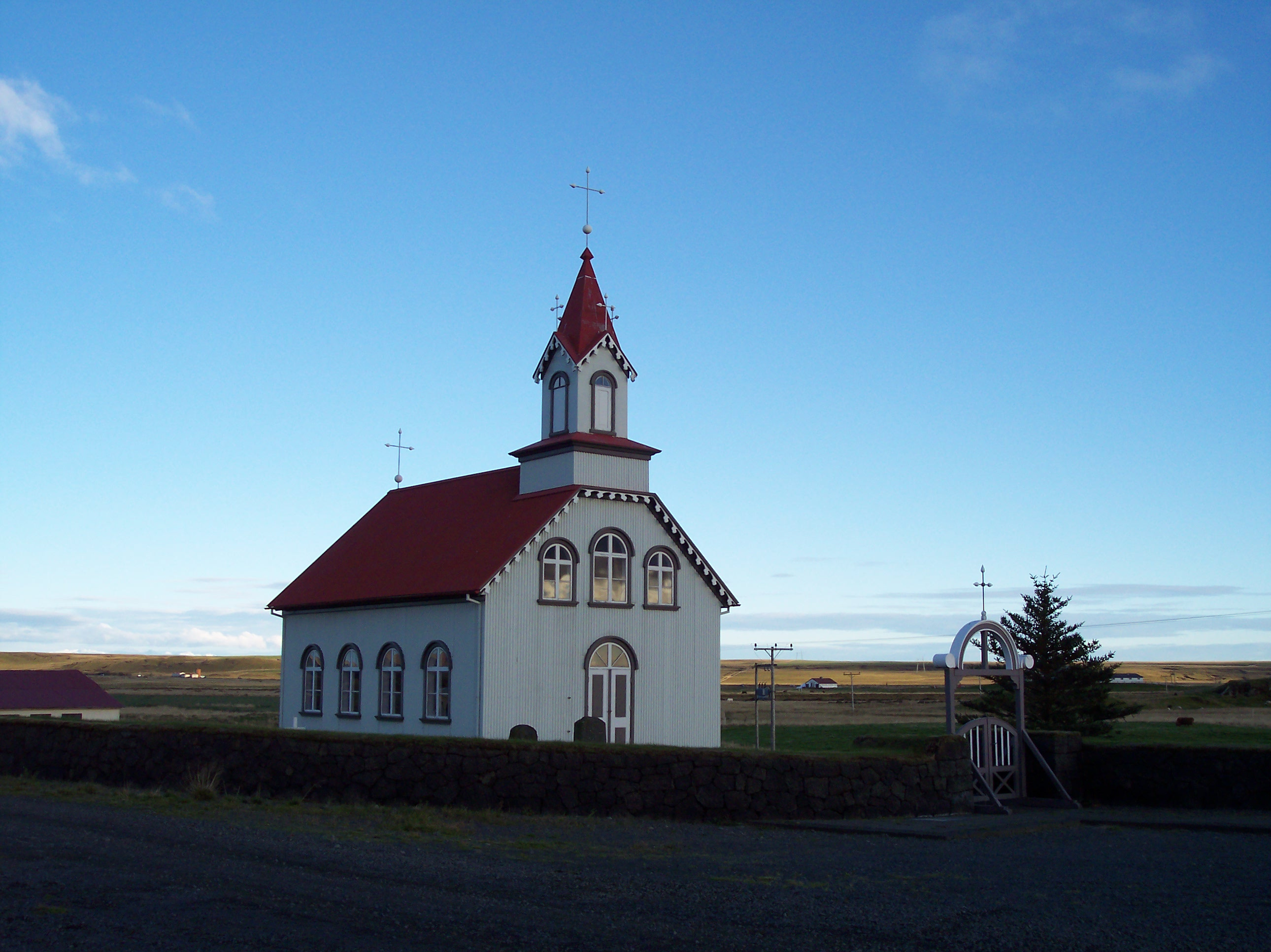

Hraungerðiskirkja (Icelandic pronunciation: [ˈr̥œynˌcɛrðɪsˌcʰɪr̥ca], lit. 'Hraungerði Church') is a Lutheran church in Flóahreppur, Iceland.

The church was designed by Eiríkur Gíslason from Bitra in Hraungerðishreppur and built in 1902. It stands on the site of another former church that dated back to 1200 CE. It is a wooden church with a red roof. On each side of the church are four windows, curved from the top with six-pane frames. Above the front door of the church are three windows. The church is clad in panel board with the chancel wall and the truss clad in flat slabs.

The church exterior was renovated, the tower rebuilt, concrete plastered, repairs to the frame and new windows installed as well as protective doors in 1993-97 under the supervision of Hjörleif Stefánsson.

== Other sources ==
- Margrét Hallgrímsdóttir, Þorsteinn Gunnarsson og Karl Sigurbjörnsson (2002), Kirkjur á Íslandi. 2. bindi, Þjóðminjasafn Íslands, Húsafriðunarnefnd ríkisins og Biskupsstofa, Reykjavík, ISBN 9979-66-115-1
