= Vilhjálmur Árnason (politician) =

Icelandic politician (born 1983)

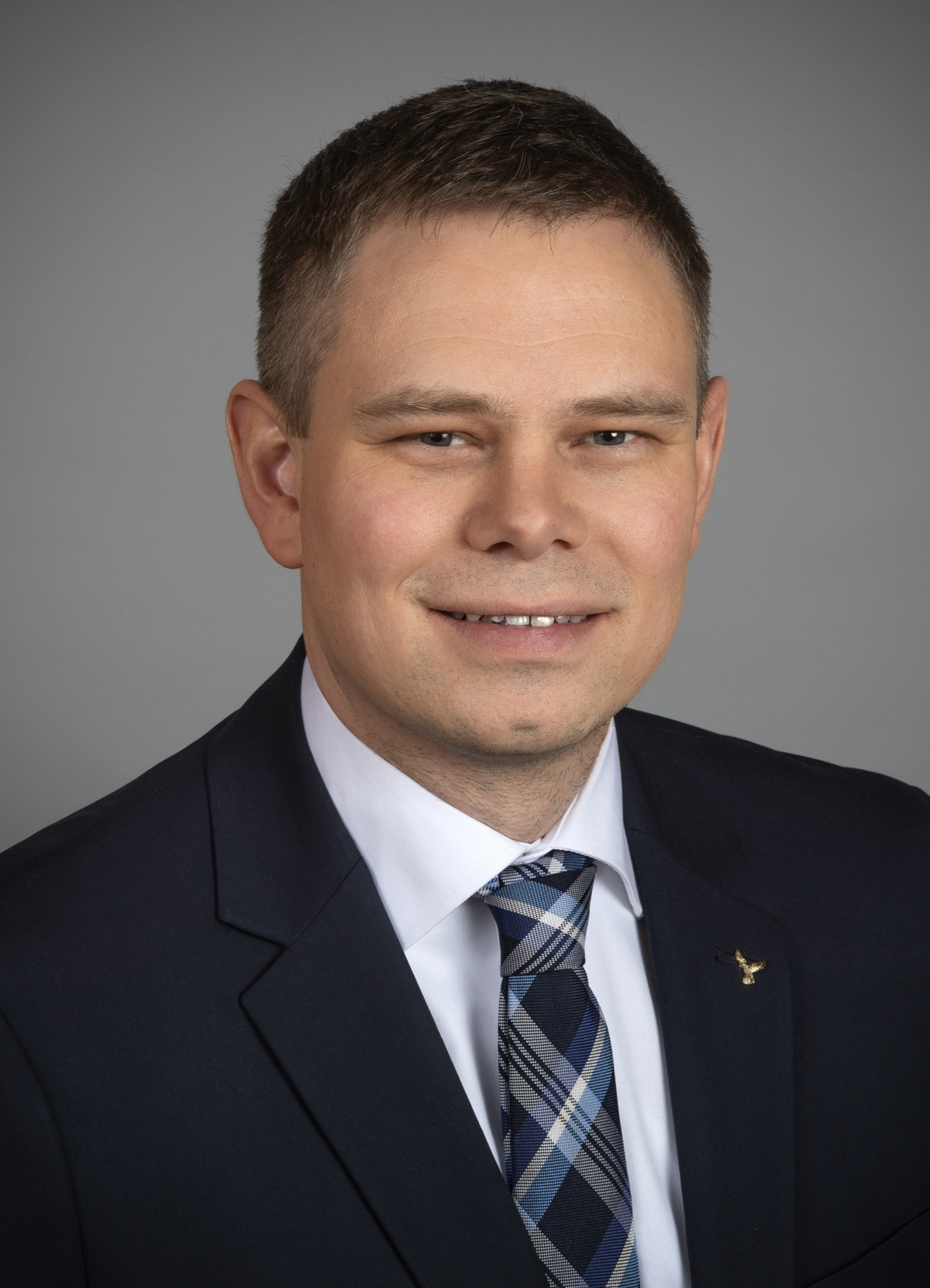
- Official government portrait, 2025

Mayor of Reykjanesbær
- Incumbent
- Assumed office 2026

Representative for Iceland in the European Parliament
- In office 2017–2018
- Constituency: Iceland

Secretary of the Independence Party
- Incumbent
- Assumed office 2022

Personal details
- Born: October 29, 1983 (age 42) Sauðárkrókur, Iceland
- Citizenship: Icelandic
- Party: Independence Party
- Education: Reykjavík University
- Occupation: Politician
- Committees: Budget Committee (2021-2024, Member); Environment and Communications Committee (2021-2024, Chair)
- Website: https://www.althingi.is/altext/cv/da/?nfaerslunr=173

Military service
- Allegiance: Icelandic Police
- Years of service: 2008-2012

Vilhjálmur Árnason (born 29 October 1983 in Sauðárkrókur, Iceland) is an Icelandic politician, mayor of Reykjanesbær and the secretary for the Independence Party.

== Early life ==
Vilhjálmur was born in a town in northwestern Iceland called Sauðárkrókur, part of the Skagafjörður municipality, on 29 October 1983. He joined the Independence Party soon after finishing school, and obtained a bachelor's degree in law from Reykjavík University in 2013.

== Non-political career ==
Vilhjálmur served as a police officer and was head of the Board of the Icelandic Police Officers Association from 2008 until 2012.

== Political career ==
Vilhjálmur became a representative for the South Constituency in Iceland's parliament, the Althing, in 2013. He was re-elected to the same position in 2016, 2017, 2021, and 2024. before resigning in 2026 to become the mayor of reykjanesbær

From 2021 to 2024, he served as a member of the Budget Committee and as chair of the Environment and Communications Committee.

From 2017 to 2018, Vilhjálmur served as a representative of Iceland within the European Parliament.

In 2022, at the 44th party conference, Vilhjálmur was elected to become the secretary for the Independence Party.

== 2026 Reykjanesbær elections ==
On January 3rd 2026, vilhjámur Árnason announced he wanted to run for mayor of reykjanesbær after sitting in parliament for 13 years which created shock from a lot of people, and won the race on January 31st 2026 where he got 58% of the vote to become the mayoral candidate for the Independence Party (Iceland), his main goals were helping Grindavik, where he had lived for years, lower taxes for people & a more diverse housing market

On may 16th 2026, Vilhjámur Árnason & the Independence Party won the elections, winning nearly 40% of the vote, & giving the independence party control of Reykjanesbær after 12 years out

On may 21st 2026 Independence Party officially signed a deal with Centre Party to form a majority coalition in reykjanesbær

On June 2nd, vilhjámur Árnason officially became mayor of reykjanesbær as his term started, ending the Samfylkingin & Framsókn coalition which lasted a stable 16 years for a new right wing coalition

On June 8th, vilhjámur Árnason officially resigned from parliament to focus fully on reykjanesbær after 13 years, vilhjámur Árnason was the 3rd longest serving parliament member
