= Ásdís Rán Gunnarsdóttir =

Icelandic model (born 1979)

- Born: 12 August 1979 (age 46); Egilsstaðir, Iceland
- Occupations: Model, entrepreneur, television producer
- Spouse: Garðar Gunnlaugsson (m. 2006; div. 2012)
- Children: 3

Ásdís Rán Gunnarsdóttir (born 12 August 1979) is an Icelandic model, entrepreneur and television producer.

In 2009, she appeared in the Bulgarian TV show Footballer's wife. During the 2010s, she worked as a television producer at 365 Miðlar.

In January 2024, she declared her candidacy for the president of Iceland in the upcoming presidential elections.

== Political career ==
=== 2024 presidential election ===
Gunnarsdóttir ran as a candidate for the 2024 Icelandic presidential election. According to Gunnarsdóttir, her campaign began as a joke on Facebook and had intended to make a reality television show about the presidency. The project fell through, but Gunnarsdóttir chose to pursue the election seriously.

She stated her goal to avoid 'political nonsense' and emphasized her past experience in foreign business as well as being a model, which she stated had parallels to the presidency due to both having a public nature.

Gunnarsdóttir ran as an independent, with no party approaching her to be their candidate. In response, she stated that she had no preference among the parties who had inquired about her running. She ultimately received 394 votes in the election, or around 0.2% of the vote.

== Personal life ==
Ásdís was married to footballer Garðar Gunnlaugsson with whom she has two children. They divorced in 2012. Gunnlaugsson had been playing Bulgaria at the time of their divorce, and Gunnarsdóttir remained in the country, befriending and starting a business with Ruja Ignatova. In 2017, Ignatova fled Bulgaria amidst allegations of cryptocurrency fraud and an Interpol notice. Gunnarsdóttir, during her presidential campaign, stated that her relationship with Ignatova would have no impact on her leadership capabilities.
