= Arnar Þór Jónsson =

Icelandic lawyer

Personal details
- Born: Arnar Þór Jónsson; 2 May 1971 (age 55) Iceland
- Party: Independence Party (2021–2024); Independent (Jan–Sep 2024); Democratic Party (2024–present)

Arnar Þór Jónsson (born on 2 May 1971) is an Icelandic lawyer and former judge who had served a deputy member of the Althing from 2021 to 2024, when he resigned his seat as a candidate for the 2024 Icelandic presidential election. He was a former district judge and has the right to speak before the Supreme Court.

== Biography ==
Arnar was born on 2 May 1971.

Arnar was the chairman in FSF, an association of independents on sovereignty issues, an association that was founded in 2019 following the approval of the Alþingi on the implementation of the EU's 3rd energy package into Icelandic law.

On 3 January 2024, Arnar declared his intention to run for president and resigned from the Independence Party and his deputy.

In October 2024, Arnar founded the Democratic Party to compete in the 2024 Icelandic parliamentary election. Arnar´s biological father was Ellert B. Schram.
