= Sverrir Stormsker =

Icelandic singer and pianist (born 1963)

Sverrir Stormsker (born 6 September 1963 in Reykjavík) is an Icelandic singer and pianist. He participated in the Eurovision Song Contest 1988, representing Iceland as half of the duo Beathoven along with Stefán Hilmarsson. The song was entitled "Þú og þeir (Sókrates)."
