= Húni Húnfjörð =

Icelandic businessman, philanthropist and basketball player

- Born: Þorsteinn Ólafur Húnfjörð; 12 May 1977 (age 49); Blönduós, Iceland
- Education: CU (2002); UNAK (2009)
- Basketball career

Personal information
- Listed height: 202 cm (6 ft 8 in)
- Listed weight: 100 kg (220 lb)

Career information
- College: Campbellsville (1998–2002)
- Playing career: 1995–2012
- Position: Center

Career history
- 1995–1997: Keflavík
- 1997–1998: Kristiansand
- 2002: Keflavík
- 2002–2003: Njarðvík
- 2003–2007: Þór Akureyri
- 2007–2009: ÍR
- 2009–2011: Ármann
- 2011–2012: ÍR

Career highlights
- Icelandic champion (1997); Icelandic Cup (1997); Icelandic Company Cup (1996); 1. deild karla (2005, 2007)

Húni Húnfjörð (born Þorsteinn Ólafur Húnfjörð; 12 May 1977) is an Icelandic businessman, philanthropist, teacher and former basketball player. In basketball, he won the Icelandic national championship and the national cup in 1997 as a member of Keflavík.

== Early life ==
Þorsteinn was born in Blönduós, Iceland, but grew up in Keflavík.

== Basketball career ==
Þorsteinn started his senior team career with Keflavík in 1995. During the 1996–1997 season, he won the Icelandic championship, Icelandic Cup and the Icelandic Company Cup with the team. In July 1997, he signed with Norwegian club Kristiansand after officials from the team saw him play for the Iceland U-22 national team in the Nordic Polar Cup during the same summer. After attending Campbellsville University for four years, where he studied business and played college basketball, he rejoined Keflavík in 2002. He left Keflavík after only a few games and joined Njarðvík. Following the season, he joined Þór Akureyri where he played four seasons, winning the second tier 1. deild karla in 2005 and 2007. He finished out his career with ÍR and Ármann.

== Later life ==
Following his basketball career, Húni taught business in the University of Akureyri. Since 2016, he has worked on building a school in Kenya.

In March 2024, he declared as a candidate in the 2024 Icelandic presidential election.
