= Democratic Party (Iceland) =

Democratic Party Lýðræðisflokkurinn
- Abbreviation: Lf
- Leader: Arnar Þór Jónsson
- Founder: Arnar Þór Jónsson
- Founded: 29 September 2024
- Split from: Independence Party
- Ideology: Libertarian conservatism Right-libertarianism; Euroscepticism
- Political position: Right-wing
- Colours: Blue; Red; White
- Slogan: Fyrir land og þjóð ('For the country and the people')
- Althing: 0 / 63

Election symbol
- L

Website
- lydraedisflokkurinn.is

The Democratic Party – Association for Self-Determination (Icelandic: Lýðræðisflokkurinn - samtök um sjálfsákvörðunarrétt, Lf) is an Icelandic political party founded by former Independence Party deputy MP and 2024 presidential candidate Arnar Þór Jónsson in September 2024. The party announced its participation in the 2024 parliamentary election.

== History ==
Arnar Þór Jónsson is an Icelandic lawyer and former judge who had served a deputy member of the Althing from 2021 to 2024. He left the Independence Party in January 2024 and ran for presidential office in the 2024 election. He came in sixth place with 5.08% of the vote.

In July 2024, Arnar Þór Jónsson reported that he was considering starting his own political party.

In September 2024, there were talks about Arnar Þór Jónsson joining the Centre Party instead of forming a new party, but those talks failed and Arnar Þór Jónsson founded the Democratic Party on 29 September 2024.

On 24 October 2024, the Democratic Party presented three candidates to lead the party in all constituencies for the 2024 parliamentary election.

== Ideology ==
According to its 2024 manifesto and statements by its leaders, the party advocates for limited government power, lower taxes, a renegotiation of Iceland's climate commitments, a move away from the European Union's energy packages and a renegotiation of the EEA agreement.

Arnar Þór Jónsson said he has high hopes for the Democratic Party, as he believes there is no right-wing party in Icelandic politics. He says that "the Independence Party has given up its role, the Centre Party says it wants to be the Centre Party, and if we are going to balance Icelandic society, we need to have an alternative on the right. You could say that Icelandic politics is unique in that there is no real alternative, no advocates for limiting state power and reducing tax collection."

== Election results ==
Election	Leader	Votes	%	Seats	+/–	Position	Government
2024	Arnar Þór Jónsson	2,215	1.04	0 / 63	New	10th	Extra-parliamentary
