= Halla Hrund Logadóttir =

Icelandic professor and politician

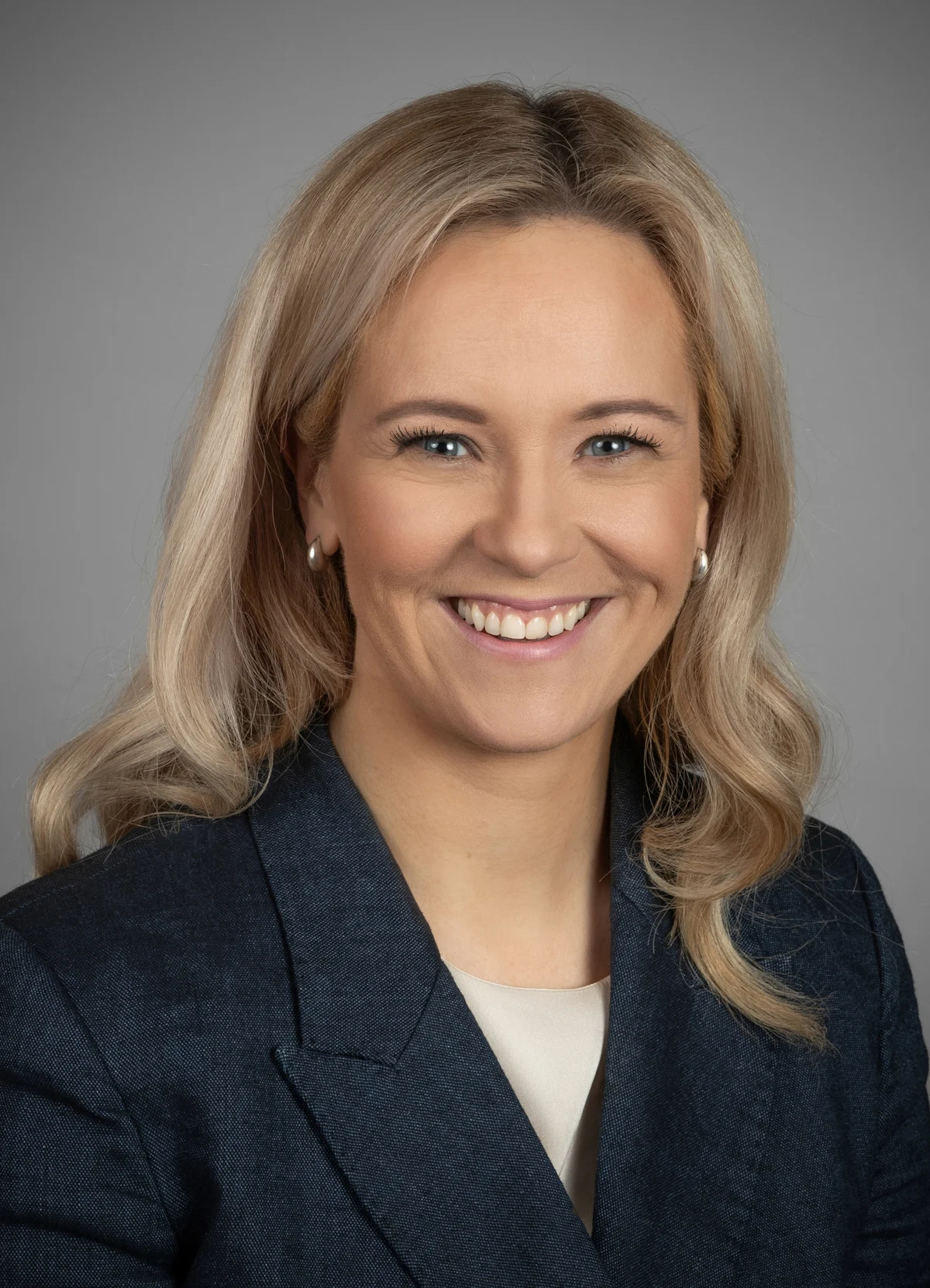
- Halla Hrund in 2025

Member of the Althing
- Incumbent
- Assumed office 30 November 2024
- Constituency: South

Personal details
- Born: 12 March 1981 (age 45) Reykjavík, Iceland
- Party: Progressive
- Spouse: Kristján Freyr Kristjánsson
- Children: 2
- Education: University of Iceland (BA); Tufts University (MA); Harvard University (MPA)

Halla Hrund Logadóttir (born 12 March 1981) is an Icelandic political scientist and politician who has served as a member of the Althing for the South constituency since 2024, representing the Progressive Party. She previously served as director-general of Orkustofnun, Iceland's national energy authority, from 2021 to 2024. She has also taught at the Harvard Kennedy School as an adjunct professor since 2019.

Halla Hrund was a candidate in the 2024 Icelandic presidential election, finishing third with 15.7% of the vote.

== Early life ==
Halla Hrund was born in Reykjavík on 12 March 1981 to Logi Ragnarsson and Jóhanna Steingrímsdóttir. She earned a bachelor's degree in political science from the University of Iceland in 2005. She completed a Master of Arts in Law and Diplomacy at The Fletcher School at Tufts University in 2011, focusing on economics and energy. In 2017, she earned a Master of Public Administration from Harvard Kennedy School, specializing in environmental and energy issues. She married Kristján Freyr Kristjánsson, a co-founder of the software company 50skills, and the couple went on to have two daughters.

== Career ==
From 2005 to 2009, Halla Hrund worked at Iceland's embassy in Brussels, Belgium, focusing on European affairs, culture and marketing. During 2009 and 2010, she worked in international trade, development cooperation and teaching in Lomé, Togo, and spent several months working at the Organisation for Economic Co-operation and Development (OECD). She subsequently served as director of international development at Reykjavík University from 2011 to 2013 and as managing director of its Iceland School of Energy from 2013 to 2016. From 2015 to 2020, Halla Hrund worked as a part-time instructor at Reykjavík University. She also served on the board of Orkusjóður from 2015 to 2021. From 2017 to 2021, she co-founded and directed the Arctic Initiative at the Belfer Center for Science and International Affairs at Harvard Kennedy School. Since 2019, she has served as an adjunct professor at Harvard Kennedy School, teaching graduate-level courses on Arctic affairs, energy and climate issues. Halla Hrund also founded the Arctic Innovation Lab, an initiative bringing together students to develop policy responses to challenges facing the Arctic. She was also a co-founder of Girls for Girls, a nonprofit mentoring programme established in 2017 to encourage women to pursue leadership roles. In June 2021, Halla Hrund became director-general of Orkustofnun, Iceland's National Energy Authority, becoming the first woman to hold the position. In April 2024, she took a leave of absence to contest the presidential election. She took another leave of absence in October 2024 while running for parliament. Her tenure as director-general ended in 2024.

== Political career ==
=== Presidential campaign ===
Halla Hrund campaign logo

On 7 April 2024, Halla Hrund announced her campaign for the 2024 Icelandic presidential election in a social media post. Halla Hrund secured ballot access on 26 April 2024 with the National Electoral Commission confirming her as an official candidate on 29 April. Her presidential campaign emphasized energy and environmental issues, gender equality, and expanding opportunities for Icelanders both domestically and internationally. She highlighted Iceland's experience in natural resource management and climate technology, and argued that the country could play an influential role internationally despite its small population. Halla Hrund and former Prime Minister of Iceland Katrín Jakobsdóttir ranked as top contenders for the presidency in the polls between late April and mid-May. On election day, she secured 15.7% of the vote, coming in third behind Halla Tómasdóttir and Katrín.

=== Alþingi ===
Halla Hrund was elected to the Althing in the 2024 Icelandic parliamentary election as a member of the Progressive Party, representing the South constituency. She served on the Environment and Communications Committee from 2025 to 2026 and on the Future Committee in 2025. Since 2025, she has been a member of Iceland's delegation to the Nordic Council, where she serves as vice-chair. In April 2026, she was elected vice-chair of the Centre Group, a political group within the Nordic Council. In June 2026, Alþingi adopted a parliamentary resolution introduced by Halla Hrund calling for a review of foreign ownership of land in Iceland. The resolution directed the government to establish an expert group to examine existing ownership, assess whether additional legal restrictions or other measures were necessary, and submit a report to inform proposed amendments to Iceland's land legislation. The resolution passed with 54 votes in favour and none against.
