= Guðbrandur Einarsson =

Icelandic politician (born 1958)

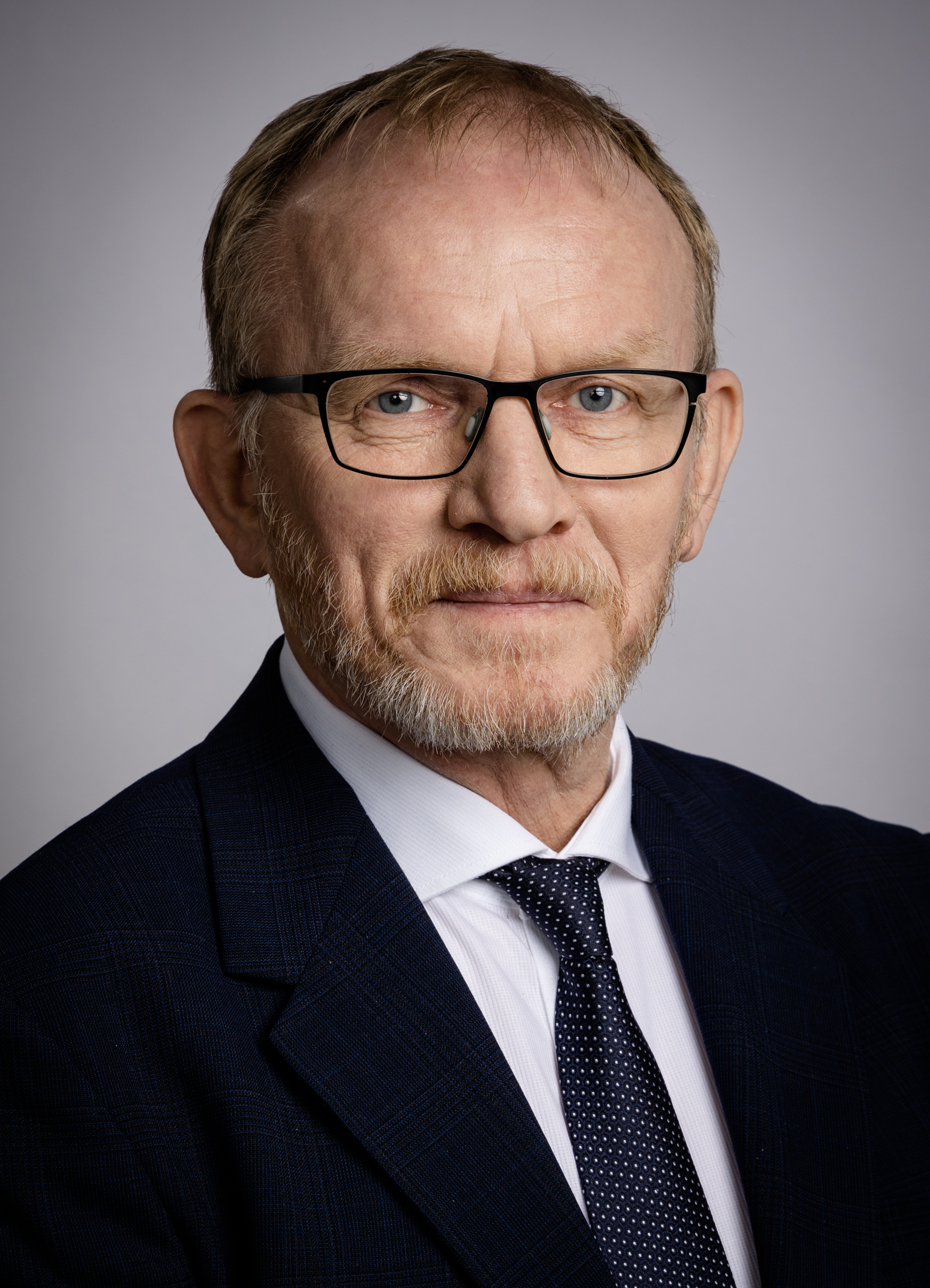
- Guðbrandur Einarsson in 2021

Member of the Althing
- Incumbent
- Assumed office 2021
- Constituency: South

Personal details
- Born: 29 October 1958 (age 67) Keflavík, Iceland
- Party: Viðreisn

Guðbrandur Einarsson (born 29 October 1958) is an Icelandic politician from Viðreisn. He is a member of the Icelandic parliament in the Southern constituency. He was first elected in the 2021 Icelandic parliamentary election.

Guðbrandur served on the Reykjanesbær municipal council from 2002 to 2010 and again from 2024 to 2022 and was president of the municipal council from 2015 to 2018 and again from 2020 to 2022. He was chairman of the Suðurnesja Merchants' Association from 1998 to 2019 and the National Union of Icelandic Merchants from 2014 to 2019. Guðbrandur has also served on various boards and councils within the labor movement and also on the boards of many companies and institutions owned by municipalities in Suðurnes.
