= Pálmi Gunnarsson =

Icelandic musician (born 1950)

- Born: 29 September 1950 (age 75); Vopnafjörður, Iceland
- Genres: Rock, pop, folk, jazz
- Occupations: Musician, songwriter
- Instruments: Vocals, bass guitar, double bass
- Years active: 1964–present

Pálmi Gunnarsson (born 29 September 1950) is an Icelandic musician, who was involved in some of the country's most popular musical acts in the 1970s and into the 1980s, including Mannakorn and Brunaliðið. He is perhaps best known internationally as a member of ICY, the trio that performed "Gleðibankinn", Iceland's first ever entry in the Eurovision Song Contest, in 1986.

In a career that has lasted over four decades, Pálmi has played with many bands across many genres, and enjoys enduring popularity around Iceland, often with songs written by his longtime collaborator Magnús Eiríksson. Several of Pálmi's recordings have become Icelandic pop classics, including his cover of Magnús Þór Sigmundsson's song Ísland er land þitt, and the Christmas song Gleði og friðarjól, composed by Magnús Eiríksson.

Pálmi is the father of Sigurður Helgi Pálmason an Icelandic member of parliament. Sigurður sang on his Christmas album Friðarjól in 1985.

== Discography ==
=== Albums ===
- Syngja lög eftir Gunnar Þórðarson (1972)
- Þuríður & Pálmi (1973) (Þuríður Sigurðardóttir on side 1, Pálmi Gunnarsson on side 2)
- Hvers vegna varst' ekki kyrr? (1980)
- Á harða harða spretti (1980)
- Í leit að lífsgæðum (1981)
- Katla og Pálmi (1982)
- Friðarjól (1985)
- Jólamyndir (1994)
- Séð og heyrt (1999)
- Þorparinn (2013)

=== Songs ===
- Gleðibankinn (1986) (as part of ICY)
- "Ísland er land þitt"
- "Gleði og friðarjól"
- "Jólahjól" (2018)
- "Núna" (2013)"Mannst' ekki eftir mér" (2002)

== Appearances in popular culture ==
Pálmi is sometimes confused with another person, Pall Gunnarsson, who has appeared in many Twenty One Pilots music videos as a character named Nico
