= Flóahreppur =

- Municipality
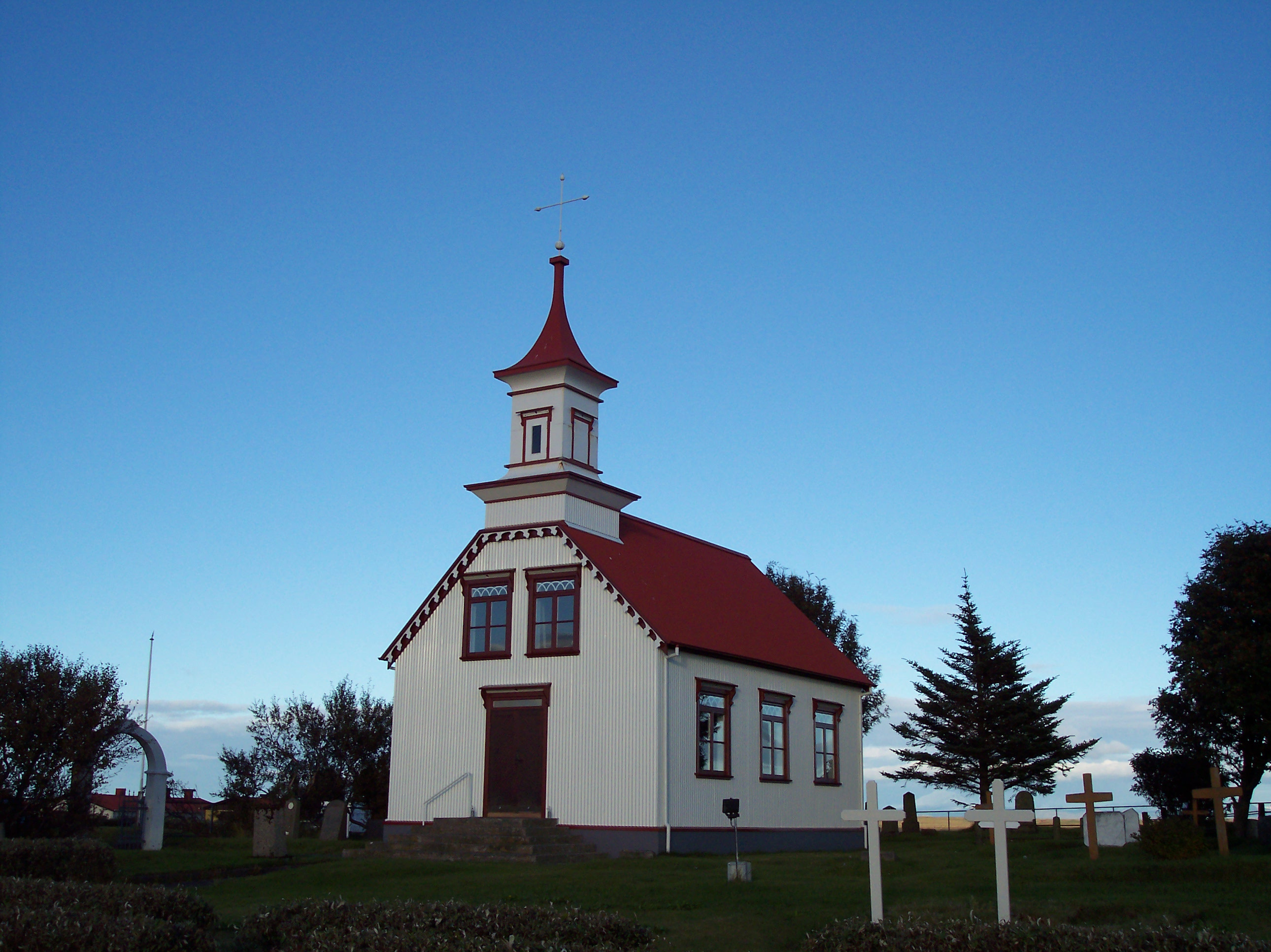
- Skyline of Flóahreppur

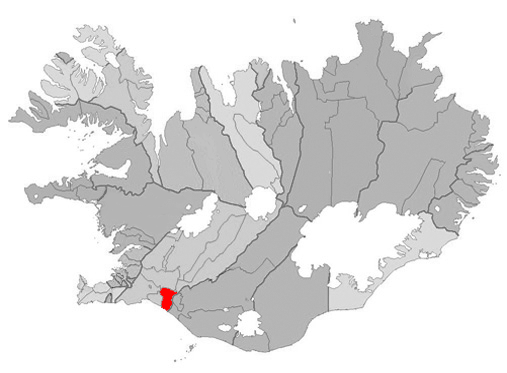
- Location of Flóahreppur

- Location within Iceland
- Coordinates: 63.9894425°N 21.2022315°W
- Country: Iceland
- Region: Southern Region
- Constituency: South Constituency

Government
  - Manager: Eydís Þ. Indriðadóttir

Area
  - Total: 289 km^{2} (112 sq mi)

Population
  - Total: 631
  - Density: 2.18/km^{2} (5.6/sq mi)
- Municipal number: 8722
- Website: floahreppur.is

Flóahreppur (Icelandic pronunciation: [ˈflouːaˌr̥ehpʏr̥]) is a municipality located in the southern region of Iceland.

== Notable landmarks ==
- Dælarétt
- Flóaáveitan
- Hraungerðiskirkja
- Hvítá
- Laugdælakirkja, Bobby Fischer a former chess grandmaster is buried there.
- Urriðafoss
- Villingaholtskirkja
- Þjórsá
- Ölvisholt brugghús
