= Baldur Þórhallsson =

Icelandic professor

Personal details
- Born: 25 January 1968 (age 57) Selfoss, Iceland
- Political party: Social Democratic Alliance (Before 2024); Independent (2024–present)
- Spouse: Felix Bergsson
- Education: University of Iceland (BA); University of Essex (MA, PhD)

Baldur Þórhallsson (born 25 January 1968) is an Icelandic academic. He is currently Professor of Political Science and Jean Monnet Chair in European Studies at the Faculty of Political Science at the University of Iceland. He was a deputy member of Alþingi in 2011 and 2012, representing the Social Democratic Alliance. In March 2024, he announced his candidacy for the President of Iceland as an independent.

== Early life ==
Baldur was born in Selfoss on 25 January 1968. His parents were Þórhallur Ægir Þorgilsson and Þorbjörg Hansdóttir. He grew up on the farm Ægissíða on the banks of river Ytri-Rangá. Baldur finished primary school in the town of Hella.

== Education ==
Baldur holds a PhD (1999) and MA (1994) in Political Science from the University of Essex in England.

In 2002, he established a Centre for Small State Studies at the University of Iceland in association with colleagues around the globe and re-established the Icelandic Institute of International Affairs. He was Chair of the Board of the institute and is currently a member of the Board.

== Research ==
Baldur's research areas are primarily small state studies, European integration, Icelandic politics and Iceland's foreign policy. He is most prominent for his research on small states and Iceland's European integration. He edited and contributed several chapters to the first Icelandic textbook on European integration. He has authored or edited three books:

- Arnórsson, Auðunn, Baldur Thorhallsson, Pia Hansson and Tómas Joensen, (eds.) 2015. Saga Evrópusamruns: Evrópusambandið og þátttaka Íslands (History of European integration: The European Union and Iceland’s engagement in the European project). Reykjavík: Háskólaútgáfan (University of Iceland Press).
- Baldur Thorhallsson (ed.). Iceland and European Integration On the Edge. London: Routledge, 2004.
- Baldur Thorhallsson. The Role of Small States in the European Union. Aldershot: Ashgate, 2000.

His most highly cited research includes the aforementioned 2000 monograph and several journal articles on the challenges and opportunities that small states face in world politics.

Baldur has taught on small states at several universities and was the ‘Class of 1955’ Visiting Professor of International Studies at Williams College (MA, USA) in 2013 and Leverhulme Visiting Professor at the Queen Mary University of London in 2017.

== Caves of Hella ==
On the farm Ægissíða were Baldur grew up there are ancient man-made caves. As a child he used to take guests and travelers on tours around the caves. In 2019 he and his family founded a company that offers guests tours around the Caves.

== Presidential campaign ==
On 20 March, Baldur launched his campaign for President of Iceland after receiving numbers of endorsement for the office. Earlier that month Gunnar Helgason launched a Facebook group where he encouraged Baldur to run and the group has more than eighteen thousand members.

== Personal life ==
Baldur is married to actor Felix Bergsson. They live in Reykjavik and have two children.
