= Björn Zoëga =

Icelandic doctor and former basketball player

- Born: 26 April 1964 (age 62); Reykjavík, Iceland
- Education: University of Iceland
- Occupation: Orthopedic surgeon
- Years active: 1990–present
- Basketball career

Career information
- Playing career: 1982–1990

Career history
- 1982–1990: Valur

Career highlights
- Icelandic champion (1983); Icelandic Cup (1983)

Björn Zoëga (born 26 April 1964 ) is an Icelandic orthopedic surgeon, a former director of the Landspitali National University Hospital of Iceland and former director of Karolinska University Hospital in Sweden. He is the current Deputy CEO of King Faisal Specialist Hospital and Research Center in Riyadh, Saudi Arabia.

== Life and work ==
Björn was born on 26 April 1964 in Reykjavík. The family name Zoëga can be traced to the Dane Jóhannes Zoëga who moved to Iceland in 1787. Björn graduated from Reykjavik Junior College in 1984. He studied medicine at the University of Iceland and graduated from there in 1990. He received his doctorate from University of Gothenburg in Sweden in 1998.

He studied orthopedic surgery at Sahlgrenska University Hospital in Gothenburg, Sweden and received a specialist license in 1996. He was chief physician of the spinal surgery department of orthopedics at Sahlgrenska from 1999 to 2002.

He was the chief physician of Landspítali's operating room in Fossvogur from 2002 and the director of the hospital's surgery department since 2005. Björn was appointed Chief Medical Officer at Landspítali from 2009 to 2013. He had previously served as Chief Medical Officer from 2007. He was the director of Landspítali from 2010 to 2013. He had previously served as director from April to October 2008. Björn was the chairman of the Valur in 2014–15.

Since 2016, he has worked for the Swedish healthcare group GHP, which operates hospitals and clinics in the Nordic countries and in the United Arab Emirates. He was the director of their spinal surgery departments in Stockholm and Gothenburg. From 2017 to 2019 he was Secretary General of therapeutic areas of GHP and in 2019 he was appointed as the director of Karolinska University Hospital.

== Basketball career ==
Björn played basketball for Valur in the Icelandic top-tier Úrvalsdeild karla from 1982 to 1990, winning the Icelandic championship and Icelandic Cup in 1983 and playing in the Úrvalsdeild finals in 1984 and 1987. He played 7 games for the Icelandic junior national teams. He served as the team doctor of the Iceland men's national basketball team at EuroBasket 2015.
