= Third cabinet of Davíð Oddsson =

Government of Iceland from 1999 to 2003

- 35th Cabinet of Iceland

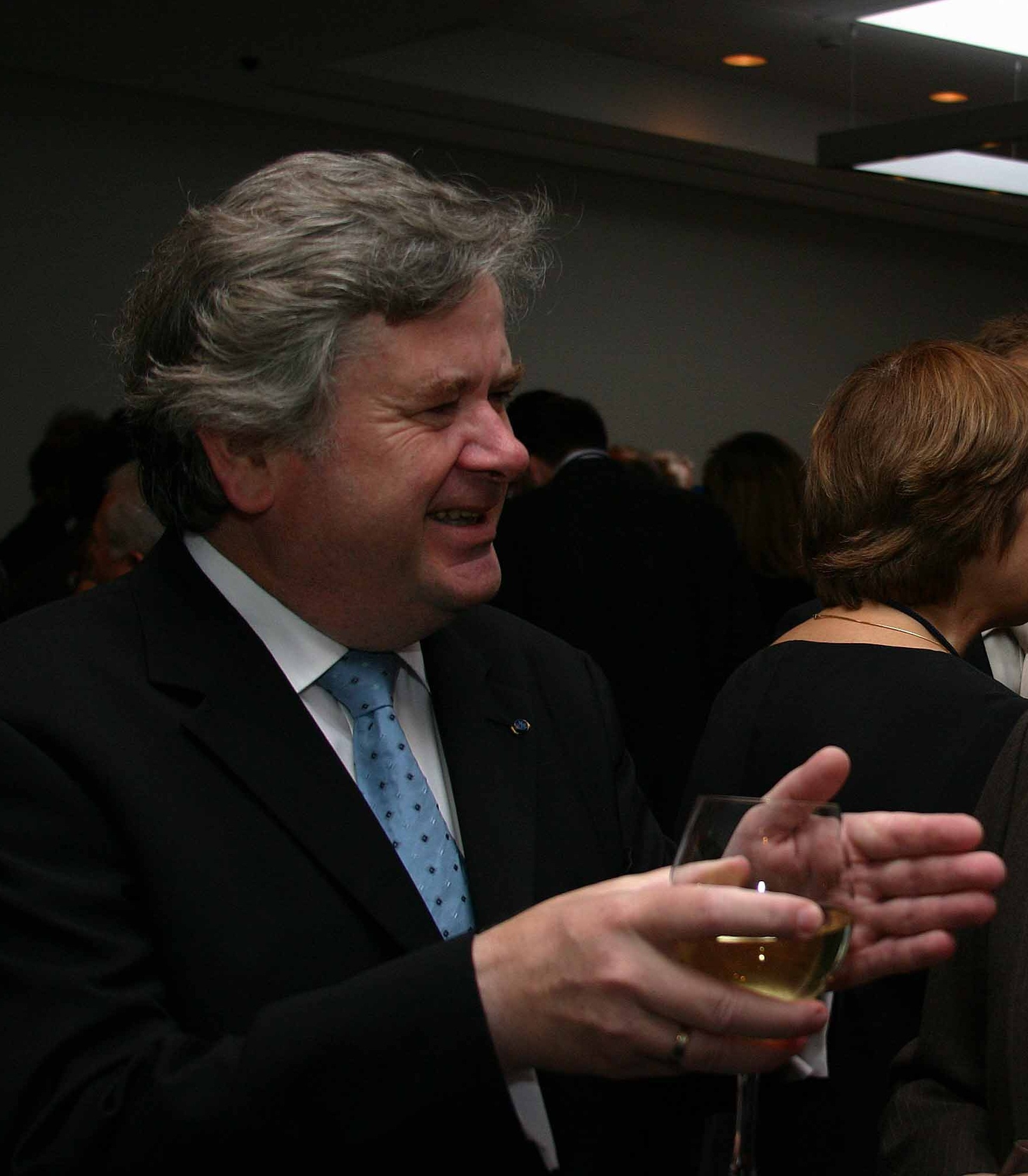
- Davíð Oddsson
- Date formed: 28 May 1999
- Date dissolved: 23 May 2003

People and organisations
- President: Ólafur Ragnar Grímsson
- Prime Minister: Davíð Oddsson
- No. of ministers: 12
- Member parties: Independence Party (D); Progressive Party (B)
- Status in legislature: Majority government (coalition)
- Opposition parties: Social Democratic Alliance (S); Left-Green Movement (V); Liberal Party

History
- Election: 1999
- Outgoing election: 2003
- Predecessor: Davíð Oddsson II
- Successor: Davíð Oddsson IV

The Third cabinet of Davíð Oddsson in Iceland, nicknamed “The privatization government” (Icelandic: Einkavæðingarstjórnin), was formed 28 May 1999.

== Cabinets ==
=== Inaugural cabinet: 28 May 1999 – 31 December 1999 ===
Incumbent	Minister	Ministry	Party
Davíð Oddsson	Prime Minister (Forsætisráðherra)	Prime Minister's Office (Forsætisráðuneytið)	D
Davíð Oddsson	Minister of Statistics Iceland (Ráðherra Hagstofu Íslands)	Statistics Iceland (Hagstofa Íslands)	D
Árni Mathiesen	Minister of Fisheries (Sjávarútvegsráðherra)	Ministry of Fisheries (Sjávarútvegsráðuneytið)	D
Björn Bjarnason	Minister of Education, Science and Culture (Menntamálaráðherra)	Ministry of Education, Science and Culture (Menntamálaráðuneytið)	D
Finnur Ingólfsson	Minister of Commerce (Viðskiptaráðherra)	Ministry of Commerce (Viðskiptaráðuneytið)	B
Finnur Ingólfsson	Minister of Industry (Iðnaðarráðherra)	Ministry of Industry (Iðnaðarráðuneytið)	B
Geir Haarde	Minister of Finance (Fjármálaráðherra)	Ministry of Finance (Fjármálaráðuneytið)	D
Guðni Ágústsson	Minister of Agriculture (Landbúnaðarráðherra)	Ministry of Agriculture (Landbúnaðarráðuneytið)	B
Halldór Ásgrímsson	Minister for Foreign Affairs (Utanríkisráðherra)	Ministry for Foreign Affairs (Utanríkisráðuneytið)	B
Ingibjörg Pálmadóttir	Minister of Health and Social Security (Heilbrigðis- og tryggingamálaráðherra)	Ministry of Health and Social Security (Heilbrigðis- og tryggingamálaráðuneytið)	B
Páll Bragi Pétursson	Minister of Social Affairs (Félagsmálaráðherra)	Ministry of Social Affairs (Félagsmálaráðuneytið)	B
Siv Friðleifsdóttir	Minister for the Environment (Umhverfisráðherra)	Ministry for the Environment (Umhverfisráðuneytið)	B
Sólveig Guðrún Pétursdóttir	Minister of Justice and Ecclesiastical Affairs (Dóms- og kirkjumálaráðherra)	Ministry of Justice and Ecclesiastical Affairs (Dóms- og kirkjumálaráðuneytið)	D
Sturla Böðvarsson	Minister of Communications (Samgönguráðherra)	Ministry of Communications (Samgönguráðuneytið)	D

=== First reshuffle: 31 December 1999 – 14 April 2001 ===
Valgerður Sverrisdóttir replaced Finnur Ingólfsson as Minister of Commerce and Minister of Industry.

Incumbent	Minister	Ministry	Party
Davíð Oddsson	Prime Minister (Forsætisráðherra)	Prime Minister's Office (Forsætisráðuneytið)	D
Davíð Oddsson	Minister of Statistics Iceland (Ráðherra Hagstofu Íslands)	Statistics Iceland (Hagstofa Íslands)	D
Árni Mathiesen	Minister of Fisheries (Sjávarútvegsráðherra)	Ministry of Fisheries (Sjávarútvegsráðuneytið)	D
Björn Bjarnason	Minister of Education, Science and Culture (Menntamálaráðherra)	Ministry of Education, Science and Culture (Menntamálaráðuneytið)	D
Geir Haarde	Minister of Finance (Fjármálaráðherra)	Ministry of Finance (Fjármálaráðuneytið)	D
Guðni Ágústsson	Minister of Agriculture (Landbúnaðarráðherra)	Ministry of Agriculture (Landbúnaðarráðuneytið)	B
Halldór Ásgrímsson	Minister for Foreign Affairs (Utanríkisráðherra)	Ministry for Foreign Affairs (Utanríkisráðuneytið)	B
Ingibjörg Pálmadóttir	Minister of Health and Social Security (Heilbrigðis- og tryggingamálaráðherra)	Ministry of Health and Social Security (Heilbrigðis- og tryggingamálaráðuneytið)	B
Páll Bragi Pétursson	Minister of Social Affairs (Félagsmálaráðherra)	Ministry of Social Affairs (Félagsmálaráðuneytið)	B
Siv Friðleifsdóttir	Minister for the Environment (Umhverfisráðherra)	Ministry for the Environment (Umhverfisráðuneytið)	B
Sólveig Guðrún Pétursdóttir	Minister of Justice and Ecclesiastical Affairs (Dóms- og kirkjumálaráðherra)	Ministry of Justice and Ecclesiastical Affairs (Dóms- og kirkjumálaráðuneytið)	D
Sturla Böðvarsson	Minister of Communications (Samgönguráðherra)	Ministry of Communications (Samgönguráðuneytið)	D
Valgerður Sverrisdóttir	Minister of Commerce (Viðskiptaráðherra)	Ministry of Commerce (Viðskiptaráðuneytið)	B
Valgerður Sverrisdóttir	Minister of Industry (Iðnaðarráðherra)	Ministry of Industry (Iðnaðarráðuneytið)	B

=== Second reshuffle: 14 April 2001 – 2 March 2002 ===
Jón Halldór Kristjánsson replaced Ingibjörg Pálmadóttir as Minister of Health and Social Security.

Incumbent	Minister	Ministry	Party
Davíð Oddsson	Prime Minister (Forsætisráðherra)	Prime Minister's Office (Forsætisráðuneytið)	D
Davíð Oddsson	Minister of Statistics Iceland (Ráðherra Hagstofu Íslands)	Statistics Iceland (Hagstofa Íslands)	D
Árni Mathiesen	Minister of Fisheries (Sjávarútvegsráðherra)	Ministry of Fisheries (Sjávarútvegsráðuneytið)	D
Björn Bjarnason	Minister of Education, Science and Culture (Menntamálaráðherra)	Ministry of Education, Science and Culture (Menntamálaráðuneytið)	D
Geir Haarde	Minister of Finance (Fjármálaráðherra)	Ministry of Finance (Fjármálaráðuneytið)	D
Guðni Ágústsson	Minister of Agriculture (Landbúnaðarráðherra)	Ministry of Agriculture (Landbúnaðarráðuneytið)	B
Halldór Ásgrímsson	Minister for Foreign Affairs (Utanríkisráðherra)	Ministry for Foreign Affairs (Utanríkisráðuneytið)	B
Jón Halldór Kristjánsson	Minister of Health and Social Security (Heilbrigðis- og tryggingamálaráðherra)	Ministry of Health and Social Security (Heilbrigðis- og tryggingamálaráðuneytið)	B
Páll Bragi Pétursson	Minister of Social Affairs (Félagsmálaráðherra)	Ministry of Social Affairs (Félagsmálaráðuneytið)	B
Siv Friðleifsdóttir	Minister for the Environment (Umhverfisráðherra)	Ministry for the Environment (Umhverfisráðuneytið)	B
Sólveig Guðrún Pétursdóttir	Minister of Justice and Ecclesiastical Affairs (Dóms- og kirkjumálaráðherra)	Ministry of Justice and Ecclesiastical Affairs (Dóms- og kirkjumálaráðuneytið)	D
Sturla Böðvarsson	Minister of Communications (Samgönguráðherra)	Ministry of Communications (Samgönguráðuneytið)	D
Valgerður Sverrisdóttir	Minister of Commerce (Viðskiptaráðherra)	Ministry of Commerce (Viðskiptaráðuneytið)	B
Valgerður Sverrisdóttir	Minister of Industry (Iðnaðarráðherra)	Ministry of Industry (Iðnaðarráðuneytið)	B

=== Third reshuffle: 2 March 2002 – 23 May 2003 ===
Tómas Ingi Olrich replaced Björn Bjarnason as Minister of Education, Science and Culture.

Incumbent	Minister	Ministry	Party
Davíð Oddsson	Prime Minister (Forsætisráðherra)	Prime Minister's Office (Forsætisráðuneytið)	D
Davíð Oddsson	Minister of Statistics Iceland (Ráðherra Hagstofu Íslands)	Statistics Iceland (Hagstofa Íslands)	D
Árni Mathiesen	Minister of Fisheries (Sjávarútvegsráðherra)	Ministry of Fisheries (Sjávarútvegsráðuneytið)	D
Geir Haarde	Minister of Finance (Fjármálaráðherra)	Ministry of Finance (Fjármálaráðuneytið)	D
Guðni Ágústsson	Minister of Agriculture (Landbúnaðarráðherra)	Ministry of Agriculture (Landbúnaðarráðuneytið)	B
Halldór Ásgrímsson	Minister for Foreign Affairs (Utanríkisráðherra)	Ministry for Foreign Affairs (Utanríkisráðuneytið)	B
Jón Halldór Kristjánsson	Minister of Health and Social Security (Heilbrigðis- og tryggingamálaráðherra)	Ministry of Health and Social Security (Heilbrigðis- og tryggingamálaráðuneytið)	B
Páll Bragi Pétursson	Minister of Social Affairs (Félagsmálaráðherra)	Ministry of Social Affairs (Félagsmálaráðuneytið)	Progressive Party
Siv Friðleifsdóttir	Minister for the Environment (Umhverfisráðherra)	Ministry for the Environment (Umhverfisráðuneytið)	B
Sólveig Guðrún Pétursdóttir	Minister of Justice and Ecclesiastical Affairs (Dóms- og kirkjumálaráðherra)	Ministry of Justice and Ecclesiastical Affairs (Dóms- og kirkjumálaráðuneytið)	D
Sturla Böðvarsson	Minister of Communications (Samgönguráðherra)	Ministry of Communications (Samgönguráðuneytið)	D
Tómas Ingi Olrich	Minister of Education, Science and Culture (Menntamálaráðherra)	Ministry of Education, Science and Culture (Menntamálaráðuneytið)	D
Valgerður Sverrisdóttir	Minister of Commerce (Viðskiptaráðherra)	Ministry of Commerce (Viðskiptaráðuneytið)	B
Valgerður Sverrisdóttir	Minister of Industry (Iðnaðarráðherra)	Ministry of Industry (Iðnaðarráðuneytið)	B

== See also ==
- Government of Iceland
- Cabinet of Iceland
