= Fourth cabinet of Davíð Oddsson =

Government of Iceland from 2003 to 2004

- 36th Cabinet of Iceland

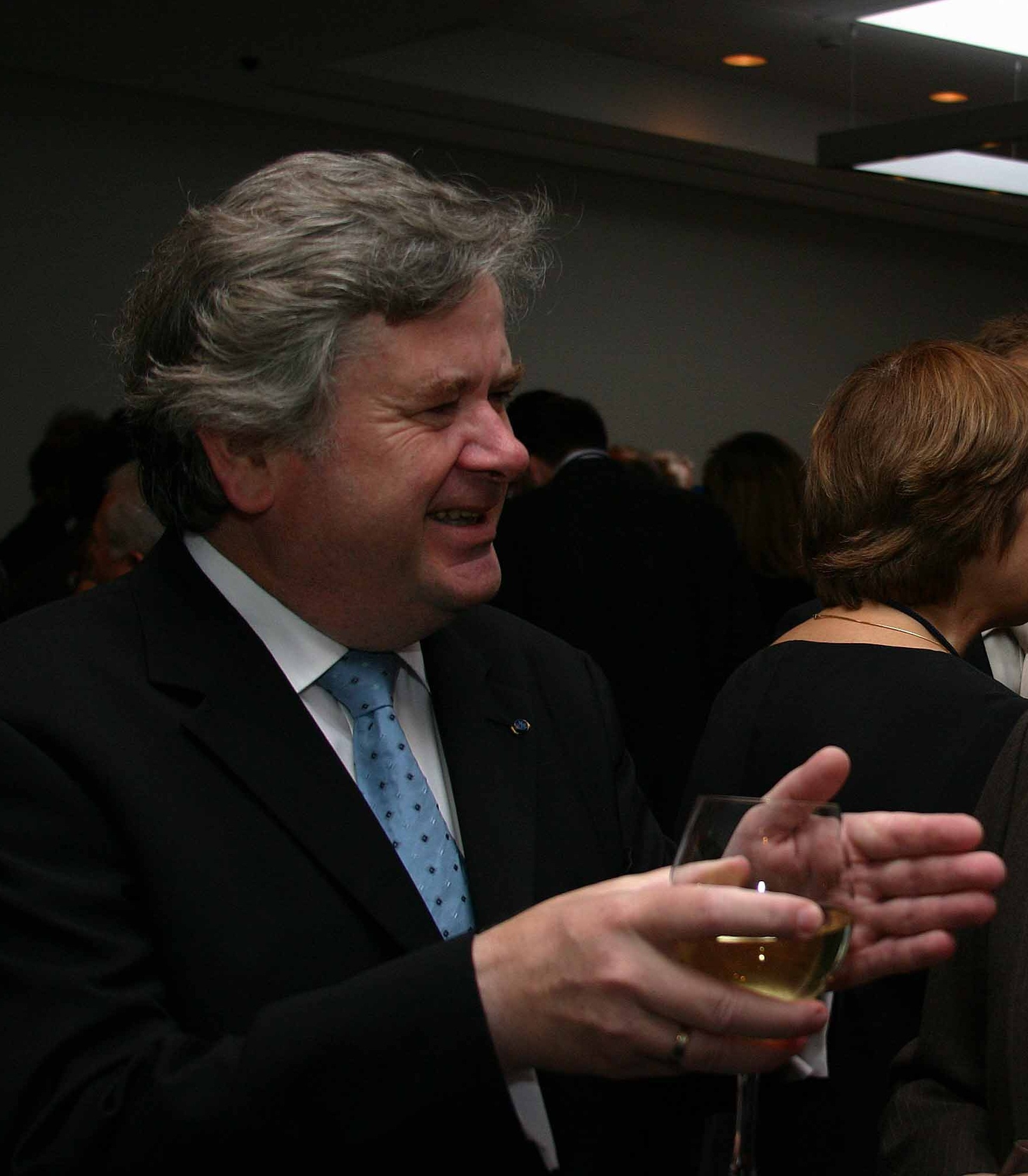
- Davíð Oddsson
- Date formed: 23 May 2003
- Date dissolved: 15 September 2004

People and organisations
- President: Ólafur Ragnar Grímsson
- Prime Minister: Davíð Oddsson
- No. of ministers: 12
- Member parties: Independence Party (D); Progressive Party (B)
- Status in legislature: Majority government (coalition)
- Opposition parties: Social Democratic Alliance (S); Left-Green Movement (V); Liberal Party

History
- Predecessor: Davíð Oddsson III
- Successor: Halldór Ásgrímsson

The Fourth cabinet of Davíð Oddsson in Iceland, nicknamed “The privatization government” (Icelandic: Einkavæðingarstjórnin), was formed 23 May 2003.

== Cabinets ==
=== Inaugural cabinet: 23 May 2003 – 31 December 2003 ===
Incumbent	Minister	Ministry	Party
Davíð Oddsson	Prime Minister (Forsætisráðherra)	Prime Minister's Office (Forsætisráðuneytið)	D
Davíð Oddsson	Minister of Statistics Iceland (Ráðherra Hagstofu Íslands)	Statistics Iceland (Hagstofa Íslands)	D
Árni Magnússon	Minister of Social Affairs (Félagsmálaráðherra)	Ministry of Social Affairs (Félagsmálaráðuneytið)	B
Árni Mathiesen	Minister of Fisheries (Sjávarútvegsráðherra)	Ministry of Fisheries (Sjávarútvegsráðuneytið)	D
Björn Bjarnason	Minister of Justice and Ecclesiastical Affairs (Dóms- og kirkjumálaráðherra)	Ministry of Justice and Ecclesiastical Affairs (Dóms- og kirkjumálaráðuneytið)	D
Geir Haarde	Minister of Finance (Fjármálaráðherra)	Ministry of Finance (Fjármálaráðuneytið)	D
Guðni Ágústsson	Minister of Agriculture (Landbúnaðarráðherra)	Ministry of Agriculture (Landbúnaðarráðuneytið)	B
Halldór Ásgrímsson	Minister for Foreign Affairs (Utanríkisráðherra)	Ministry for Foreign Affairs (Utanríkisráðuneytið)	B
Jón Halldór Kristjánsson	Minister of Health and Social Security (Heilbrigðis- og tryggingamálaráðherra)	Ministry of Health and Social Security (Heilbrigðis- og tryggingamálaráðuneytið)	B
Siv Friðleifsdóttir	Minister for the Environment (Umhverfisráðherra)	Ministry for the Environment (Umhverfisráðuneytið)	B
Sturla Böðvarsson	Minister of Communications (Samgönguráðherra)	Ministry of Communications (Samgönguráðuneytið)	D
Tómas Ingi Olrich	Minister of Education, Science and Culture (Menntamálaráðherra)	Ministry of Education, Science and Culture (Menntamálaráðuneytið)	D
Valgerður Sverrisdóttir	Minister of Commerce (Viðskiptaráðherra)	Ministry of Commerce (Viðskiptaráðuneytið)	B
Valgerður Sverrisdóttir	Minister of Industry (Iðnaðarráðherra)	Ministry of Industry (Iðnaðarráðuneytið)	B

=== Reshuffle: 31 December 2003 – 15 September 2004 ===
Þorgerður Katrín Gunnarsdóttir replaced Tómas Ingi Olrich as Minister of Education, Science and Culture.

Incumbent	Minister	Ministry	Party
Davíð Oddsson	Prime Minister (Forsætisráðherra)	Prime Minister's Office (Forsætisráðuneytið)	D
Davíð Oddsson	Minister of Statistics Iceland (Ráðherra Hagstofu Íslands)	Statistics Iceland (Hagstofa Íslands)	D
Árni Magnússon	Minister of Social Affairs (Félagsmálaráðherra)	Ministry of Social Affairs (Félagsmálaráðuneytið)	B
Árni Mathiesen	Minister of Fisheries (Sjávarútvegsráðherra)	Ministry of Fisheries (Sjávarútvegsráðuneytið)	D
Björn Bjarnason	Minister of Justice and Ecclesiastical Affairs (Dóms- og kirkjumálaráðherra)	Ministry of Justice and Ecclesiastical Affairs (Dóms- og kirkjumálaráðuneytið)	D
Geir Haarde	Minister of Finance (Fjármálaráðherra)	Ministry of Finance (Fjármálaráðuneytið)	D
Guðni Ágústsson	Minister of Agriculture (Landbúnaðarráðherra)	Ministry of Agriculture (Landbúnaðarráðuneytið)	B
Halldór Ásgrímsson	Minister for Foreign Affairs (Utanríkisráðherra)	Ministry for Foreign Affairs (Utanríkisráðuneytið)	B
Jón Halldór Kristjánsson	Minister of Health and Social Security (Heilbrigðis- og tryggingamálaráðherra)	Ministry of Health and Social Security (Heilbrigðis- og tryggingamálaráðuneytið)	B
Siv Friðleifsdóttir	Minister for the Environment (Umhverfisráðherra)	Ministry for the Environment (Umhverfisráðuneytið)	B
Sturla Böðvarsson	Minister of Communications (Samgönguráðherra)	Ministry of Communications (Samgönguráðuneytið)	D
Þorgerður Katrín Gunnarsdóttir	Minister of Education, Science and Culture (Menntamálaráðherra)	Ministry of Education, Science and Culture (Menntamálaráðuneytið)	D
Valgerður Sverrisdóttir	Minister of Commerce (Viðskiptaráðherra)	Ministry of Commerce (Viðskiptaráðuneytið)	B
Valgerður Sverrisdóttir	Minister of Industry (Iðnaðarráðherra)	Ministry of Industry (Iðnaðarráðuneytið)	B

== See also ==
- Government of Iceland
- Cabinet of Iceland
