= Cabinet of Halldór Ásgrímsson =

Government of Iceland from September 2004 to June 2006

- 37th Cabinet of Iceland

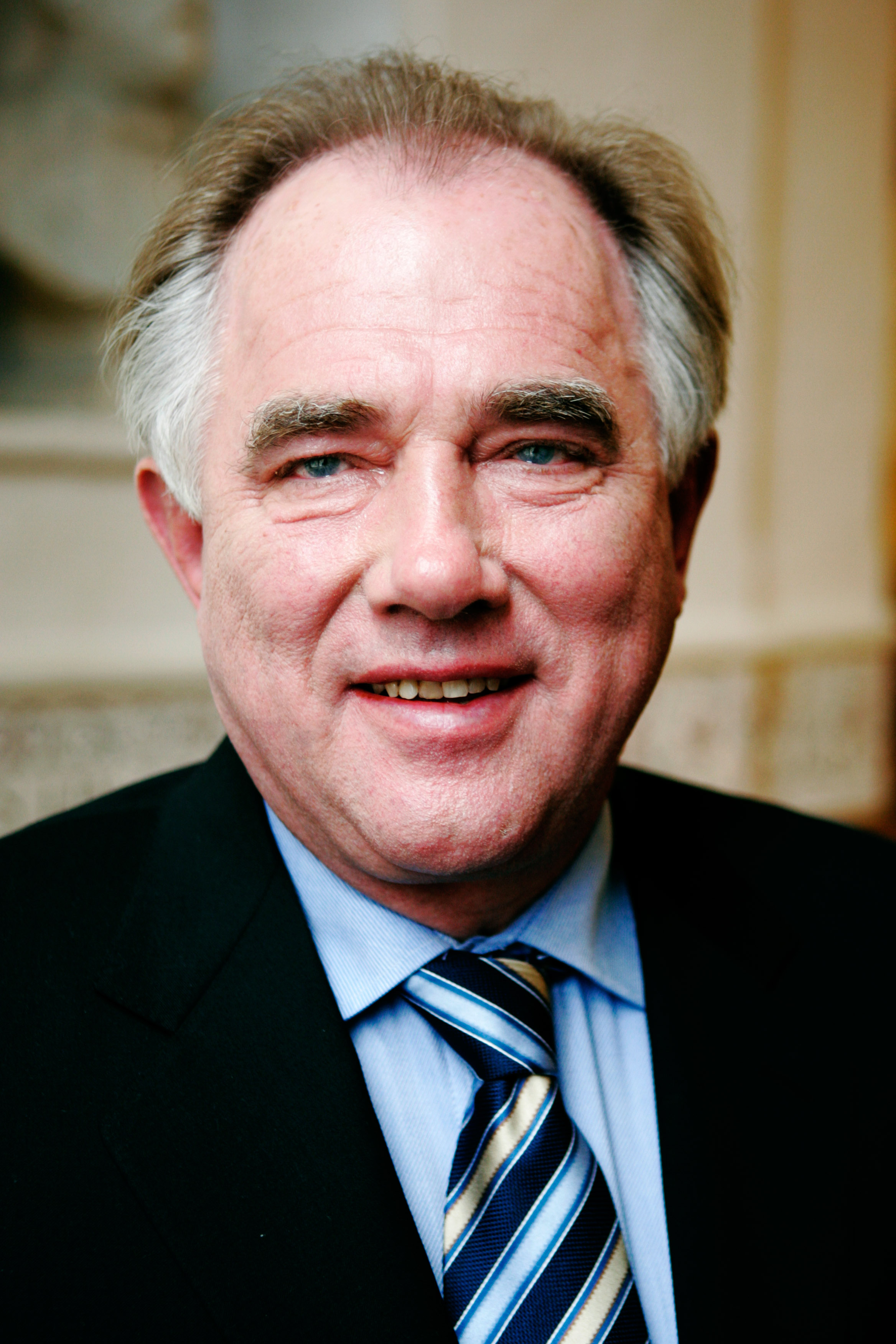
- Halldór Ásgrímsson
- Date formed: 15 September 2004
- Date dissolved: 15 June 2006

People and organisations
- President: Ólafur Ragnar Grímsson
- Prime Minister: Halldór Ásgrímsson
- No. of ministers: 12
- Member parties: Independence Party (D); Progressive Party (B)
- Status in legislature: Majority government (coalition)
- Opposition parties: Social Democratic Alliance (S); Left-Green Movement (V); Liberal Party

History
- Predecessor: Davíð Oddsson IV
- Successor: Geir Haarde I

The Cabinet of Halldór Ásgrímsson in Iceland was formed 15 September 2004.

== Cabinets ==
=== Inaugural cabinet: 15 September 2004 – 27 September 2005 ===
Incumbent	Minister	Ministry	Party
Halldór Ásgrímsson	Prime Minister (Forsætisráðherra)	Prime Minister's Office (Forsætisráðuneytið)	PP
Árni Magnússon	Minister of Social Affairs (Félagsmálaráðherra)	Ministry of Social Affairs (Félagsmálaráðuneytið)	PP
Árni Mathiesen	Minister of Fisheries (Sjávarútvegsráðherra)	Ministry of Fisheries (Sjávarútvegsráðuneytið)	IP
Björn Bjarnason	Minister of Justice and Ecclesiastical Affairs (Dóms- og kirkjumálaráðherra)	Ministry of Justice and Ecclesiastical Affairs (Dóms- og kirkjumálaráðuneytið)	IP
Davíð Oddsson	Minister for Foreign Affairs (Utanríkisráðherra)	Ministry for Foreign Affairs (Utanríkisráðuneytið)	IP
Davíð Oddsson	Minister of Statistics Iceland (Ráðherra Hagstofu Íslands)	Statistics Iceland (Hagstofa Íslands)	IP
Geir Haarde	Minister of Finance (Fjármálaráðherra)	Ministry of Finance (Fjármálaráðuneytið)	IP
Guðni Ágústsson	Minister of Agriculture (Landbúnaðarráðherra)	Ministry of Agriculture (Landbúnaðarráðuneytið)	PP
Jón Halldór Kristjánsson	Minister of Health and Social Security (Heilbrigðis- og tryggingamálaráðherra)	Ministry of Health and Social Security (Heilbrigðis- og tryggingamálaráðuneytið)	PP
Sigríður Anna Þórðardóttir	Minister for the Environment (Umhverfisráðherra)	Ministry for the Environment (Umhverfisráðuneytið)	IP
Sturla Böðvarsson	Minister of Communications (Samgönguráðherra)	Ministry of Communications (Samgönguráðuneytið)	IP
Þorgerður Katrín Gunnarsdóttir	Minister of Education, Science and Culture (Menntamálaráðherra)	Ministry of Education, Science and Culture (Menntamálaráðuneytið)	IP
Valgerður Sverrisdóttir	Minister of Commerce (Viðskiptaráðherra)	Ministry of Commerce (Viðskiptaráðuneytið)	PP
Valgerður Sverrisdóttir	Minister of Industry (Iðnaðarráðherra)	Ministry of Industry (Iðnaðarráðuneytið)	PP

=== First reshuffle: 27 September 2005 – 7 March 2006 ===
Árni Mathiesen replaced Geir Haarde as Minister of Finance. Einar Kristinn Guðfinnsson replaced Árni Mathiesen as Minister of Fisheries. Geir Haarde replaced Davíð Oddsson as Minister for Foreign Affairs. Halldór Ásgrímsson replaced Davíð Oddsson as Minister of Statistics Iceland.

Incumbent	Minister	Ministry	Party
Halldór Ásgrímsson	Prime Minister (Forsætisráðherra)	Prime Minister's Office (Forsætisráðuneytið)	PP
Halldór Ásgrímsson	Minister of Statistics Iceland (Ráðherra Hagstofu Íslands)	Statistics Iceland (Hagstofa Íslands)	PP
Árni Magnússon	Minister of Social Affairs (Félagsmálaráðherra)	Ministry of Social Affairs (Félagsmálaráðuneytið)	PP
Árni Mathiesen	Minister of Finance (Fjármálaráðherra)	Ministry of Finance (Fjármálaráðuneytið)	IP
Björn Bjarnason	Minister of Justice and Ecclesiastical Affairs (Dóms- og kirkjumálaráðherra)	Ministry of Justice and Ecclesiastical Affairs (Dóms- og kirkjumálaráðuneytið)	IP
Einar Kristinn Guðfinnsson	Minister of Fisheries (Sjávarútvegsráðherra)	Ministry of Fisheries (Sjávarútvegsráðuneytið)	IP
Geir Haarde	Minister for Foreign Affairs (Utanríkisráðherra)	Ministry for Foreign Affairs (Utanríkisráðuneytið)	IP
Guðni Ágústsson	Minister of Agriculture (Landbúnaðarráðherra)	Ministry of Agriculture (Landbúnaðarráðuneytið)	PP
Jón Halldór Kristjánsson	Minister of Health and Social Security (Heilbrigðis- og tryggingamálaráðherra)	Ministry of Health and Social Security (Heilbrigðis- og tryggingamálaráðuneytið)	PP
Sigríður Anna Þórðardóttir	Minister for the Environment (Umhverfisráðherra)	Ministry for the Environment (Umhverfisráðuneytið)	IP
Sturla Böðvarsson	Minister of Communications (Samgönguráðherra)	Ministry of Communications (Samgönguráðuneytið)	IP
Þorgerður Katrín Gunnarsdóttir	Minister of Education, Science and Culture (Menntamálaráðherra)	Ministry of Education, Science and Culture (Menntamálaráðuneytið)	IP
Valgerður Sverrisdóttir	Minister of Commerce (Viðskiptaráðherra)	Ministry of Commerce (Viðskiptaráðuneytið)	PP
Valgerður Sverrisdóttir	Minister of Industry (Iðnaðarráðherra)	Ministry of Industry (Iðnaðarráðuneytið)	PP

=== Second reshuffle: 7 March 2006 – 15 June 2006 ===
Jón Halldór Kristjánsson replaced Árni Magnússon as Minister of Social Affairs. Siv Friðleifsdóttir replaced Jón Halldór Kristjánsson as Minister of Health and Social Security.

Incumbent	Minister	Ministry	Party
Halldór Ásgrímsson	Prime Minister (Forsætisráðherra)	Prime Minister's Office (Forsætisráðuneytið)	PP
Halldór Ásgrímsson	Minister of Statistics Iceland (Ráðherra Hagstofu Íslands)	Statistics Iceland (Hagstofa Íslands)	PP
Árni Mathiesen	Minister of Finance (Fjármálaráðherra)	Ministry of Finance (Fjármálaráðuneytið)	IP
Björn Bjarnason	Minister of Justice and Ecclesiastical Affairs (Dóms- og kirkjumálaráðherra)	Ministry of Justice and Ecclesiastical Affairs (Dóms- og kirkjumálaráðuneytið)	IP
Einar Kristinn Guðfinnsson	Minister of Fisheries (Sjávarútvegsráðherra)	Ministry of Fisheries (Sjávarútvegsráðuneytið)	IP
Geir Haarde	Minister for Foreign Affairs (Utanríkisráðherra)	Ministry for Foreign Affairs (Utanríkisráðuneytið)	IP
Guðni Ágústsson	Minister of Agriculture (Landbúnaðarráðherra)	Ministry of Agriculture (Landbúnaðarráðuneytið)	PP
Jón Halldór Kristjánsson	Minister of Social Affairs (Félagsmálaráðherra)	Ministry of Social Affairs (Félagsmálaráðuneytið)	PP
Sigríður Anna Þórðardóttir	Minister for the Environment (Umhverfisráðherra)	Ministry for the Environment (Umhverfisráðuneytið)	IP
Siv Friðleifsdóttir	Minister of Health and Social Security (Heilbrigðis- og tryggingamálaráðherra)	Ministry of Health and Social Security (Heilbrigðis- og tryggingamálaráðuneytið)	PP
Sturla Böðvarsson	Minister of Communications (Samgönguráðherra)	Ministry of Communications (Samgönguráðuneytið)	IP
Þorgerður Katrín Gunnarsdóttir	Minister of Education, Science and Culture (Menntamálaráðherra)	Ministry of Education, Science and Culture (Menntamálaráðuneytið)	IP
Valgerður Sverrisdóttir	Minister of Commerce (Viðskiptaráðherra)	Ministry of Commerce (Viðskiptaráðuneytið)	PP
Valgerður Sverrisdóttir	Minister of Industry (Iðnaðarráðherra)	Ministry of Industry (Iðnaðarráðuneytið)	PP

== See also ==
- Government of Iceland
- Cabinet of Iceland
