= Cabinet of Benedikt Sigurðsson Gröndal =

Government of Iceland from 1979 to 1980

Benedikt Sigurðsson Gröndal
- 27th Cabinet of Iceland
- Date formed: 15 October 1979
- Date dissolved: 8 February 1980

People and organisations
- Head of state: Kristján Eldjárn
- Head of government: Benedikt Sigurðsson Gröndal
- Member party: Social Democratic Party (SDP)

History
- Outgoing election: 1979 election
- Predecessor: Ólafur Jóhannesson II
- Successor: Gunnar Thoroddsen

The Cabinet of Benedikt Sigurðsson Gröndal in Iceland was formed 15 October 1979.

== Cabinet ==
=== Inaugural cabinet: 15 October 1979 – 8 February 1980 ===
Incumbent	Minister	Ministry	Party
Benedikt Sigurðsson Gröndal	Prime Minister (Forsætisráðherra)	Prime Minister's Office (Forsætisráðuneytið)	SDP
Benedikt Sigurðsson Gröndal	Minister for Foreign Affairs (Utanríkisráðherra)	Ministry for Foreign Affairs (Utanríkisráðuneytið)	SDP
Bragi Sigurjónsson	Minister of Agriculture (Landbúnaðarráðherra)	Ministry of Agriculture (Landbúnaðarráðuneytið)	SDP
Bragi Sigurjónsson	Minister of Industry (Iðnaðarráðherra)	Ministry of Industry (Iðnaðarráðuneytið)	SDP
Kjartan Jóhannsson	Minister of Fisheries (Sjávarútvegsráðherra)	Ministry of Fisheries (Sjávarútvegsráðuneytið)	SDP
Kjartan Jóhannsson	Minister of Commerce (Viðskiptaráðherra)	Ministry of Commerce (Viðskiptaráðuneytið)	SDP
Magnús Helgi Magnússon	Minister of Communications (Samgönguráðherra)	Ministry of Communications (Samgönguráðuneytið)	SDP
Magnús Helgi Magnússon	Minister of Health and Social Security (Heilbrigðis- og tryggingamálaráðherra)	Ministry of Health and Social Security (Heilbrigðis- og tryggingamálaráðuneytið)	SDP
Magnús Helgi Magnússon	Minister of Social Affairs (Félagsmálaráðherra)	Ministry of Social Affairs (Félagsmálaráðuneytið)	SDP
Sighvatur Kristinn Björgvinsson	Minister of Finance (Fjármálaráðherra)	Ministry of Finance (Fjármálaráðuneytið)	SDP
Sighvatur Kristinn Björgvinsson	Minister of Statistics Iceland (Ráðherra Hagstofu Íslands)	Statistics Iceland (Hagstofa Íslands)	SDP
Vilmundur Gylfason	Minister of Education, Science and Culture (Menntamálaráðherra)	Ministry of Education, Science and Culture (Menntamálaráðuneytið)	SDP
Vilmundur Gylfason	Minister of Justice and Ecclesiastical Affairs (Dóms- og kirkjumálaráðherra)	Ministry of Justice and Ecclesiastical Affairs (Dóms- og kirkjumálaráðuneytið)	SDP

== See also ==
- Government of Iceland
- Cabinet of Iceland
