= Second cabinet of Ólafur Jóhannesson =

Cabinet of Iceland, 1978–1979

- 26th Cabinet of Iceland
- Date formed: 1 September 1978
- Date dissolved: 15 October 1979

People and organisations
- Head of state: Kristján Eldjárn
- Head of government: Ólafur Jóhannesson
- Member parties: Social Democratic Party (SDP); People's Alliance (PA); Progressive Party (PP)

History
- Predecessor: Geir Hallgrímsson
- Successor: Benedikt Sigurðsson Gröndal

The Second cabinet of Ólafur Jóhannesson in Iceland, nicknamed “The third left government” (Icelandic: Vinstristjórn III), was formed 1 September 1978.

== Cabinet ==
=== Inaugural cabinet: 1 September 1978 – 15 October 1979 ===
Incumbent	Minister	Ministry	Party
Ólafur Jóhannesson	Prime Minister (Forsætisráðherra)	Prime Minister's Office (Forsætisráðuneytið)	PP
Ólafur Jóhannesson	Minister of Statistics Iceland (Ráðherra Hagstofu Íslands)	Statistics Iceland (Hagstofa Íslands)	PP
Benedikt Sigurðsson Gröndal	Minister for Foreign Affairs (Utanríkisráðherra)	Ministry for Foreign Affairs (Utanríkisráðuneytið)	SDP
Hjörleifur Guttormsson	Minister of Industry (Iðnaðarráðherra)	Ministry of Industry (Iðnaðarráðuneytið)	PA
Kjartan Jóhannsson	Minister of Fisheries (Sjávarútvegsráðherra)	Ministry of Fisheries (Sjávarútvegsráðuneytið)	SDP
Magnús Helgi Magnússon	Minister of Health and Social Security (Heilbrigðis- og tryggingamálaráðherra)	Ministry of Health and Social Security (Heilbrigðis- og tryggingamálaráðuneytið)	SDP
Magnús Helgi Magnússon	Minister of Social Affairs (Félagsmálaráðherra)	Ministry of Social Affairs (Félagsmálaráðuneytið)	SDP
Ragnar Arnalds	Minister of Communications (Samgönguráðherra)	Ministry of Communications (Samgönguráðuneytið)	PA
Ragnar Arnalds	Minister of Education, Science and Culture (Menntamálaráðherra)	Ministry of Education, Science and Culture (Menntamálaráðuneytið)	PA
Steingrímur Hermannsson	Minister of Agriculture (Landbúnaðarráðherra)	Ministry of Agriculture (Landbúnaðarráðuneytið)	PP
Steingrímur Hermannsson	Minister of Justice and Ecclesiastical Affairs (Dóms- og kirkjumálaráðherra)	Ministry of Justice and Ecclesiastical Affairs (Dóms- og kirkjumálaráðuneytið)	PP
Svavar Gestsson	Minister of Commerce (Viðskiptaráðherra)	Ministry of Commerce (Viðskiptaráðuneytið)	PA
Tómas Árnason	Minister of Finance (Fjármálaráðherra)	Ministry of Finance (Fjármálaráðuneytið)	PP

== See also ==
- Government of Iceland
- Cabinet of Iceland
