= Cabinet of Gunnar Thoroddsen =

28th Cabinet of Iceland

- 28th Cabinet of Iceland
- Date formed: 8 February 1980
- Date dissolved: 26 May 1983

People and organisations
- Head of state: Kristján Eldjárn; (to 1 August 1980); Vigdís Finnbogadóttir; (from 1 August 1980)
- Head of government: Gunnar Thoroddsen
- Member parties: Independence Party (IP); Progressive Party (PP); People's Alliance (PA)

History
- Outgoing election: 1983 election
- Predecessor: Benedikt Sigurðsson Gröndal
- Successor: Steingrímur Hermannsson I

The Cabinet of Gunnar Thoroddsen in Iceland was formed 8 February 1980.

== Cabinet ==
=== Inaugural cabinet: 8 February 1980 – 26 May 1983 ===
Incumbent	Minister	Ministry	Party
Gunnar Thoroddsen	Prime Minister (Forsætisráðherra)	Prime Minister's Office (Forsætisráðuneytið)	IP
Gunnar Thoroddsen	Minister of Statistics Iceland (Ráðherra Hagstofu Íslands)	Statistics Iceland (Hagstofa Íslands)	IP
Friðjón Þórðarson	Minister of Justice and Ecclesiastical Affairs (Dóms- og kirkjumálaráðherra)	Ministry of Justice and Ecclesiastical Affairs (Dóms- og kirkjumálaráðuneytið)	IP
Hjörleifur Guttormsson	Minister of Industry (Iðnaðarráðherra)	Ministry of Industry (Iðnaðarráðuneytið)	PA
Ingvar Gíslason	Minister of Education, Science and Culture (Menntamálaráðherra)	Ministry of Education, Science and Culture (Menntamálaráðuneytið)	PP
Ólafur Jóhannesson	Minister for Foreign Affairs (Utanríkisráðherra)	Ministry for Foreign Affairs (Utanríkisráðuneytið)	PP
Pálmi Jónsson	Minister of Agriculture (Landbúnaðarráðherra)	Ministry of Agriculture (Landbúnaðarráðuneytið)	IP
Steingrímur Hermannsson	Minister of Communications (Samgönguráðherra)	Ministry of Communications (Samgönguráðuneytið)	PP
Steingrímur Hermannsson	Minister of Fisheries (Sjávarútvegsráðherra)	Ministry of Fisheries (Sjávarútvegsráðuneytið)	PP
Svavar Gestsson	Minister of Health and Social Security (Heilbrigðis- og tryggingamálaráðherra)	Ministry of Health and Social Security (Heilbrigðis- og tryggingamálaráðuneytið)	PA
Svavar Gestsson	Minister of Social Affairs (Félagsmálaráðherra)	Ministry of Social Affairs (Félagsmálaráðuneytið)	PA
Ragnar Arnalds	Minister of Finance (Fjármálaráðherra)	Ministry of Finance (Fjármálaráðuneytið)	PA
Tómas Árnason	Minister of Commerce (Viðskiptaráðherra)	Ministry of Commerce (Viðskiptaráðuneytið)	PP

== See also ==
- Government of Iceland
- Cabinet of Iceland
