= Cabinet of Geir Hallgrímsson =

Government of Iceland from 1974 to 1978

- 25th Cabinet of Iceland
- Date formed: 28 August 1974
- Date dissolved: 1 September 1978

People and organisations
- Head of state: Kristján Eldjárn
- Head of government: Geir Hallgrímsson
- Member parties: Independence Party (IP); Progressive Party (PP)

History
- Outgoing election: 1978 election
- Predecessor: Ólafur Jóhannesson I
- Successor: Ólafur Jóhannesson II

The Cabinet of Geir Hallgrímsson in Iceland was formed 28 August 1974.

== Cabinet ==
=== Inaugural cabinet: 28 August 1974 – 1 September 1978 ===
Incumbent	Minister	Ministry	Party
Geir Hallgrímsson	Prime Minister (Forsætisráðherra)	Prime Minister's Office (Forsætisráðuneytið)	IP
Geir Hallgrímsson	Minister of Statistics Iceland (Ráðherra Hagstofu Íslands)	Statistics Iceland (Hagstofa Íslands)	IP
Einar Ágústsson	Minister for Foreign Affairs (Utanríkisráðherra)	Ministry for Foreign Affairs (Utanríkisráðuneytið)	PP
Gunnar Thoroddsen	Minister of Industry (Iðnaðarráðherra)	Ministry of Industry (Iðnaðarráðuneytið)	IP
Gunnar Thoroddsen	Minister of Social Affairs (Félagsmálaráðherra)	Ministry of Social Affairs (Félagsmálaráðuneytið)	IP
Halldór Eggert Sigurðsson	Minister of Agriculture (Landbúnaðarráðherra)	Ministry of Agriculture (Landbúnaðarráðuneytið)	PP
Halldór Eggert Sigurðsson	Minister of Communications (Samgönguráðherra)	Ministry of Communications (Samgönguráðuneytið)	PP
Matthías Árni Mathiesen	Minister of Finance (Fjármálaráðherra)	Ministry of Finance (Fjármálaráðuneytið)	IP
Matthías Bjarnason	Minister of Fisheries (Sjávarútvegsráðherra)	Ministry of Fisheries (Sjávarútvegsráðuneytið)	IP
Matthías Bjarnason	Minister of Health and Social Security (Heilbrigðis- og tryggingamálaráðherra)	Ministry of Health and Social Security (Heilbrigðis- og tryggingamálaráðuneytið)	IP
Ólafur Jóhannesson	Minister of Commerce (Viðskiptaráðherra)	Ministry of Commerce (Viðskiptaráðuneytið)	PP
Ólafur Jóhannesson	Minister of Justice and Ecclesiastical Affairs (Dóms- og kirkjumálaráðherra)	Ministry of Justice and Ecclesiastical Affairs (Dóms- og kirkjumálaráðuneytið)	PP
Vilhjálmur Hjálmarsson	Minister of Education, Science and Culture (Menntamálaráðherra)	Ministry of Education, Science and Culture (Menntamálaráðuneytið)	PP

== See also ==
- Government of Iceland
- Cabinet of Iceland
