= Second cabinet of Steingrímur Hermannsson =

Government of Iceland from 1988 to 1989

- 31st Cabinet of Iceland
- Date formed: 28 September 1988
- Date dissolved: 10 September 1989

People and organisations
- Head of state: Vigdís Finnbogadóttir
- Head of government: Steingrímur Hermannsson
- Member parties: Progressive Party (PP); Social Democratic Party (SDP); People's Alliance (PA)

History
- Predecessor: Þorsteinn Pálsson
- Successor: Steingrímur Hermannsson III

The Second cabinet of Steingrímur Hermannsson in Iceland, nicknamed “The fourth left government” (Icelandic: Vinstristjórn IV), was formed 28 September 1988.

== Cabinet ==
=== Inaugural cabinet: 28 September 1988 – 10 September 1989 ===
Incumbent	Minister	Ministry	Party
Steingrímur Hermannsson	Prime Minister (Forsætisráðherra)	Prime Minister's Office (Forsætisráðuneytið)	PP
Steingrímur Hermannsson	Minister of Statistics Iceland (Ráðherra Hagstofu Íslands)	Statistics Iceland (Hagstofa Íslands)	PP
Guðmundur Kristján Bjarnason	Minister of Health and Social Security (Heilbrigðis- og tryggingamálaráðherra)	Ministry of Health and Social Security (Heilbrigðis- og tryggingamálaráðuneytið)	PP
Halldór Ásgrímsson	Minister of Fisheries (Sjávarútvegsráðherra)	Ministry of Fisheries (Sjávarútvegsráðuneytið)	PP
Halldór Ásgrímsson	Minister of Justice and Ecclesiastical Affairs (Dóms- og kirkjumálaráðherra)	Ministry of Justice and Ecclesiastical Affairs (Dóms- og kirkjumálaráðuneytið)	PP
Jóhanna Sigurðardóttir	Minister of Social Affairs (Félagsmálaráðherra)	Ministry of Social Affairs (Félagsmálaráðuneytið)	SDP
Jón Baldvin Hannibalsson	Minister for Foreign Affairs (Utanríkisráðherra)	Ministry for Foreign Affairs (Utanríkisráðuneytið)	SDP
Jón Sigurðsson	Minister of Commerce (Viðskiptaráðherra)	Ministry of Commerce (Viðskiptaráðuneytið)	SDP
Jón Sigurðsson	Minister of Industry (Iðnaðarráðherra)	Ministry of Industry (Iðnaðarráðuneytið)	SDP
Ólafur Ragnar Grímsson	Minister of Finance (Fjármálaráðherra)	Ministry of Finance (Fjármálaráðuneytið)	PA
Steingrímur J. Sigfússon	Minister of Agriculture (Landbúnaðarráðherra)	Ministry of Agriculture (Landbúnaðarráðuneytið)	PA
Steingrímur J. Sigfússon	Minister of Communications (Samgönguráðherra)	Ministry of Communications (Samgönguráðuneytið)	PA
Svavar Gestsson	Minister of Education, Science and Culture (Menntamálaráðherra)	Ministry of Education, Science and Culture (Menntamálaráðuneytið)	PA

== See also ==
- Government of Iceland
- Cabinet of Iceland
