= Cabinet of Jóhann Hafstein =

Government of Iceland from 1970 to 1971

- 23rd Cabinet of Iceland
- Date formed: 10 July 1970
- Date dissolved: 14 July 1971

People and organisations
- Head of state: Kristján Eldjárn
- Head of government: Jóhann Hafstein
- Member parties: Independence Party (IP); Social Democratic Party (SDP)

History
- Outgoing election: 1971 election
- Predecessor: Bjarni Benediktsson
- Successor: Ólafur Jóhannesson I

The Cabinet of Jóhann Hafstein in Iceland, nicknamed “The restoration government” (Icelandic: Viðreisnarstjórnin), was formed 10 July 1970.

== Cabinets ==
=== Inaugural cabinet: 10 July 1970 – 10 October 1970 ===
Incumbent	Minister	Ministry	Party
Jóhann Hafstein	Prime Minister (Forsætisráðherra)	Prime Minister's Office (Forsætisráðuneytið)	IP
Jóhann Hafstein	Minister of Industry (Iðnaðarráðherra)	Ministry of Industry (Iðnaðarráðuneytið)	IP
Jóhann Hafstein	Minister of Justice and Ecclesiastical Affairs (Dóms- og kirkjumálaráðherra)	Ministry of Justice and Ecclesiastical Affairs (Dóms- og kirkjumálaráðuneytið)	IP
Eggert Gíslason Þorsteinsson	Minister of Fisheries (Sjávarútvegsráðherra)	Ministry of Fisheries (Sjávarútvegsráðuneytið)	SDP
Eggert Gíslason Þorsteinsson	Minister of Health and Social Security (Heilbrigðis- og tryggingamálaráðherra)	Ministry of Health and Social Security (Heilbrigðis- og tryggingamálaráðuneytið)	SDP
Emil Jónsson	Minister for Foreign Affairs (Utanríkisráðherra)	Ministry for Foreign Affairs (Utanríkisráðuneytið)	SDP
Emil Jónsson	Minister of Social Affairs (Félagsmálaráðherra)	Ministry of Social Affairs (Félagsmálaráðuneytið)	SDP
Gylfi Þorsteinsson Gíslason	Minister of Commerce (Viðskiptaráðherra)	Ministry of Commerce (Viðskiptaráðuneytið)	SDP
Gylfi Þorsteinsson Gíslason	Minister of Education, Science and Culture (Menntamálaráðherra)	Ministry of Education, Science and Culture (Menntamálaráðuneytið)	SDP
Ingólfur Jónsson	Minister of Communications (Samgönguráðherra)	Ministry of Communications (Samgönguráðuneytið)	IP
Ingólfur Jónsson	Minister of Agriculture (Landbúnaðarráðherra)	Ministry of Agriculture (Landbúnaðarráðuneytið)	IP
Magnús Jónsson	Minister of Finance (Fjármálaráðherra)	Ministry of Finance (Fjármálaráðuneytið)	IP
Magnús Jónsson	Minister of Statistics Iceland (Ráðherra Hagstofu Íslands)	Statistics Iceland (Hagstofa Íslands)	IP

=== Reshuffle: 10 October 1970 – 14 July 1971 ===
Auður Auðuns replaced Jóhann Hafstein as Minister of Justice and Ecclesiastical Affairs.

Incumbent	Minister	Ministry	Party
Jóhann Hafstein	Prime Minister (Forsætisráðherra)	Prime Minister's Office (Forsætisráðuneytið)	IP
Jóhann Hafstein	Minister of Industry (Iðnaðarráðherra)	Ministry of Industry (Iðnaðarráðuneytið)	IP
Auður Auðuns	Minister of Justice and Ecclesiastical Affairs (Dóms- og kirkjumálaráðherra)	Ministry of Justice and Ecclesiastical Affairs (Dóms- og kirkjumálaráðuneytið)	IP
Eggert Gíslason Þorsteinsson	Minister of Fisheries (Sjávarútvegsráðherra)	Ministry of Fisheries (Sjávarútvegsráðuneytið)	SDP
Eggert Gíslason Þorsteinsson	Minister of Health and Social Security (Heilbrigðis- og tryggingamálaráðherra)	Ministry of Health and Social Security (Heilbrigðis- og tryggingamálaráðuneytið)	SDP
Emil Jónsson	Minister for Foreign Affairs (Utanríkisráðherra)	Ministry for Foreign Affairs (Utanríkisráðuneytið)	SDP
Emil Jónsson	Minister of Social Affairs (Félagsmálaráðherra)	Ministry of Social Affairs (Félagsmálaráðuneytið)	SDP
Gylfi Þorsteinsson Gíslason	Minister of Commerce (Viðskiptaráðherra)	Ministry of Commerce (Viðskiptaráðuneytið)	SDP
Gylfi Þorsteinsson Gíslason	Minister of Education, Science and Culture (Menntamálaráðherra)	Ministry of Education, Science and Culture (Menntamálaráðuneytið)	SDP
Ingólfur Jónsson	Minister of Communications (Samgönguráðherra)	Ministry of Communications (Samgönguráðuneytið)	IP
Ingólfur Jónsson	Minister of Agriculture (Landbúnaðarráðherra)	Ministry of Agriculture (Landbúnaðarráðuneytið)	IP
Magnús Jónsson	Minister of Finance (Fjármálaráðherra)	Ministry of Finance (Fjármálaráðuneytið)	IP
Magnús Jónsson	Minister of Statistics Iceland (Ráðherra Hagstofu Íslands)	Statistics Iceland (Hagstofa Íslands)	IP

== See also ==
- Government of Iceland
- Cabinet of Iceland
