= First cabinet of Ólafur Jóhannesson =

Government of Iceland from 1971 to 1974

- 24th Cabinet of Iceland
- Date formed: 14 July 1971
- Date dissolved: 28 August 1974

People and organisations
- Head of state: Kristján Eldjárn
- Head of government: Ólafur Jóhannesson
- Member parties: Progressive Party (PP); People's Alliance (PA); Union of Liberals and Leftists (ULL)

History
- Outgoing election: 1974 election
- Predecessor: Jóhann Hafstein
- Successor: Geir Hallgrímsson

The First cabinet of Ólafur Jóhannesson in Iceland, nicknamed “The second left government” (Icelandic: Vinstristjórn II), was formed 14 July 1971.

== Cabinets ==
=== Inaugural cabinet: 14 July 1971 – 16 July 1973 ===
Incumbent	Minister	Ministry	Party
Ólafur Jóhannesson	Prime Minister (Forsætisráðherra)	Prime Minister's Office (Forsætisráðuneytið)	PP
Ólafur Jóhannesson	Minister of Justice and Ecclesiastical Affairs (Dóms- og kirkjumálaráðherra)	Ministry of Justice and Ecclesiastical Affairs (Dóms- og kirkjumálaráðuneytið)	PP
Einar Ágústsson	Minister for Foreign Affairs (Utanríkisráðherra)	Ministry for Foreign Affairs (Utanríkisráðuneytið)	PP
Halldór Eggert Sigurðsson	Minister of Agriculture (Landbúnaðarráðherra)	Ministry of Agriculture (Landbúnaðarráðuneytið)	PP
Halldór Eggert Sigurðsson	Minister of Finance (Fjármálaráðherra)	Ministry of Finance (Fjármálaráðuneytið)	PP
Hannibal Valdimarsson	Minister of Communications (Samgönguráðherra)	Ministry of Communications (Samgönguráðuneytið)	ULL
Hannibal Valdimarsson	Minister of Social Affairs (Félagsmálaráðherra)	Ministry of Social Affairs (Félagsmálaráðuneytið)	ULL
Lúðvík Aðalsteinn Jósepsson	Minister of Commerce (Viðskiptaráðherra)	Ministry of Commerce (Viðskiptaráðuneytið)	PA
Lúðvík Aðalsteinn Jósepsson	Minister of Fisheries (Sjávarútvegsráðherra)	Ministry of Fisheries (Sjávarútvegsráðuneytið)	PA
Magnús Kjartansson	Minister of Health and Social Security (Heilbrigðis- og tryggingamálaráðherra)	Ministry of Health and Social Security (Heilbrigðis- og tryggingamálaráðuneytið)	PA
Magnús Kjartansson	Minister of Industry (Iðnaðarráðherra)	Ministry of Industry (Iðnaðarráðuneytið)	PA
Magnús Torfi Ólafsson	Minister of Education, Science and Culture (Menntamálaráðherra)	Ministry of Education, Science and Culture (Menntamálaráðuneytið)	ULL
Magnús Torfi Ólafsson	Minister of Statistics Iceland (Ráðherra Hagstofu Íslands)	Statistics Iceland (Hagstofa Íslands)	ULL

=== First reshuffle: 16 July 1973 – 6 May 1974 ===
Björn Jónsson replaced Hannibal Valdimarsson as Minister of Communications and Minister of Social Affairs.

Incumbent	Minister	Ministry	Party
Ólafur Jóhannesson	Prime Minister (Forsætisráðherra)	Prime Minister's Office (Forsætisráðuneytið)	PP
Ólafur Jóhannesson	Minister of Justice and Ecclesiastical Affairs (Dóms- og kirkjumálaráðherra)	Ministry of Justice and Ecclesiastical Affairs (Dóms- og kirkjumálaráðuneytið)	PP
Björn Jónsson	Minister of Communications (Samgönguráðherra)	Ministry of Communications (Samgönguráðuneytið)	ULL
Björn Jónsson	Minister of Social Affairs (Félagsmálaráðherra)	Ministry of Social Affairs (Félagsmálaráðuneytið)	ULL
Einar Ágústsson	Minister for Foreign Affairs (Utanríkisráðherra)	Ministry for Foreign Affairs (Utanríkisráðuneytið)	PP
Halldór Eggert Sigurðsson	Minister of Agriculture (Landbúnaðarráðherra)	Ministry of Agriculture (Landbúnaðarráðuneytið)	PP
Halldór Eggert Sigurðsson	Minister of Finance (Fjármálaráðherra)	Ministry of Finance (Fjármálaráðuneytið)	PP
Lúðvík Aðalsteinn Jósepsson	Minister of Commerce (Viðskiptaráðherra)	Ministry of Commerce (Viðskiptaráðuneytið)	PA
Lúðvík Aðalsteinn Jósepsson	Minister of Fisheries (Sjávarútvegsráðherra)	Ministry of Fisheries (Sjávarútvegsráðuneytið)	PA
Magnús Kjartansson	Minister of Health and Social Security (Heilbrigðis- og tryggingamálaráðherra)	Ministry of Health and Social Security (Heilbrigðis- og tryggingamálaráðuneytið)	PA
Magnús Kjartansson	Minister of Industry (Iðnaðarráðherra)	Ministry of Industry (Iðnaðarráðuneytið)	PA
Magnús Torfi Ólafsson	Minister of Education, Science and Culture (Menntamálaráðherra)	Ministry of Education, Science and Culture (Menntamálaráðuneytið)	ULL
Magnús Torfi Ólafsson	Minister of Statistics Iceland (Ráðherra Hagstofu Íslands)	Statistics Iceland (Hagstofa Íslands)	ULL

=== Second reshuffle: 6 May 1974 – 28 August 1974 ===
Magnús Torfi Ólafsson replaced Björn Jónsson as Minister of Communications and Minister of Social Affairs.

Incumbent	Minister	Ministry	Party
Ólafur Jóhannesson	Prime Minister (Forsætisráðherra)	Prime Minister's Office (Forsætisráðuneytið)	PP
Ólafur Jóhannesson	Minister of Justice and Ecclesiastical Affairs (Dóms- og kirkjumálaráðherra)	Ministry of Justice and Ecclesiastical Affairs (Dóms- og kirkjumálaráðuneytið)	PP
Einar Ágústsson	Minister for Foreign Affairs (Utanríkisráðherra)	Ministry for Foreign Affairs (Utanríkisráðuneytið)	PP
Halldór Eggert Sigurðsson	Minister of Agriculture (Landbúnaðarráðherra)	Ministry of Agriculture (Landbúnaðarráðuneytið)	PP
Halldór Eggert Sigurðsson	Minister of Finance (Fjármálaráðherra)	Ministry of Finance (Fjármálaráðuneytið)	PP
Lúðvík Aðalsteinn Jósepsson	Minister of Commerce (Viðskiptaráðherra)	Ministry of Commerce (Viðskiptaráðuneytið)	PA
Lúðvík Aðalsteinn Jósepsson	Minister of Fisheries (Sjávarútvegsráðherra)	Ministry of Fisheries (Sjávarútvegsráðuneytið)	PA
Magnús Kjartansson	Minister of Health and Social Security (Heilbrigðis- og tryggingamálaráðherra)	Ministry of Health and Social Security (Heilbrigðis- og tryggingamálaráðuneytið)	PA
Magnús Kjartansson	Minister of Industry (Iðnaðarráðherra)	Ministry of Industry (Iðnaðarráðuneytið)	PA
Magnús Torfi Ólafsson	Minister of Communications (Samgönguráðherra)	Ministry of Communications (Samgönguráðuneytið)	ULL
Magnús Torfi Ólafsson	Minister of Education, Science and Culture (Menntamálaráðherra)	Ministry of Education, Science and Culture (Menntamálaráðuneytið)	ULL
Magnús Torfi Ólafsson	Minister of Social Affairs (Félagsmálaráðherra)	Ministry of Social Affairs (Félagsmálaráðuneytið)	ULL
Magnús Torfi Ólafsson	Minister of Statistics Iceland (Ráðherra Hagstofu Íslands)	Statistics Iceland (Hagstofa Íslands)	ULL

== See also ==
- Government of Iceland
- Cabinet of Iceland
