= Minister of Social Affairs (Iceland) =

The Minister of Social Affairs (Icelandic: Félagsmálaráðherra) was a cabinet position which existed between 17 April 1939 and 1 January 2008. The Ministry of Social Affairs existed alongside the minister after 1 January 1970 when the Cabinet of Iceland Act no. 73/1969 took effect since ministries had not formally existed separately from the ministers. On 1 January 2008 the position became Minister of Social Affairs and Social Security (Icelandic: Félags- og tryggingamálaráðuneytið) and the ministry itself was also renamed accordingly. On 31 December 2010 the Ministry of Social Affairs and Social Security was merged with the Ministry of Health and Social Security to form the Ministry of Welfare.

== List of ministers ==
=== Minister of Social Affairs (17 April 1939 – 1 January 2008) ===
| Nº | Minister | Took office | Left office | Duration | Party | Cabinet |
|---|---|---|---|---|---|---|
| 1 | Stefán Jóhann Stefánsson (1894–1980) | 17 April 1939 | 17 January 1942 | 2 years, 9 months (1,006) | SDP | Hermann Jónasson III |
| 1 | Stefán Jóhann Stefánsson (1894–1980) | 17 April 1939 | 17 January 1942 | 2 years, 9 months (1,006) | SDP | Hermann Jónasson IV |
| 2 | Jakob Möller (1880–1955) | 17 January 1942 | 16 December 1942 | 10 months, 29 days (333 days) | IP | Ólafur Thors I |
No minister in office between 16 December 1942 and 22 December 1942.
| 3 | Jóhann Sæmundsson (1905–1955) | 22 December 1942 | 19 April 1943 | 3 months, 28 days (118 days) | N/A | Björn Þórðarson |
| 4 | Björn Þórðarson (1879–1963) | 19 April 1943 | 21 October 1944 | 1 year, 6 months, 2 days (551 days) | PP | Björn Þórðarson |
| 5 | Finnur Jónsson (1894–1951) | 21 October 1944 | 4 February 1947 | 2 years, 3 months, 14 days (836 days) | SDP | Ólafur Thors II |
| (1) | Stefán Jóhann Stefánsson (1894–1980) | 4 February 1947 | 6 December 1949 | 2 years, 10 months, 2 days (1,036 days) | SDP | Stefán Jóhann Stefánsson |
| 6 | Ólafur Thors (1892–1964) | 6 December 1949 | 14 March 1950 | 3 months, 8 days (98 days) | IP | Ólafur Thors III |
| 7 | Steingrímur Steinþórsson (1893–1966) | 14 March 1950 | 24 July 1956 | 6 years, 4 months, 10 days (2,324 days) | PP | Steingrímur Steinþórsson |
| 7 | Steingrímur Steinþórsson (1893–1966) | 14 March 1950 | 24 July 1956 | 6 years, 4 months, 10 days (2,324 days) | PP | Ólafur Thors IV |
| 8 | Hannibal Valdimarsson (1903–1991) | 24 July 1956 | 23 December 1958 | 2 years, 4 months, 29 days (882 days) | PA | Hermann Jónasson V |
| 9 | Friðjón Skarphéðinsson (1909–1996) | 23 December 1958 | 20 November 1959 | 10 months, 28 days (332 days) | SDP | Emil Jónsson |
| 10 | Emil Jónsson (1902–1986) | 20 November 1959 | 31 August 1965 | 5 years, 9 months, 11 days (2,111 days) | SDP | Ólafur Thors V |
| 10 | Emil Jónsson (1902–1986) | 20 November 1959 | 31 August 1965 | 5 years, 9 months, 11 days (2,111 days) | SDP | Bjarni Benediktsson |
| 11 | Eggert Gíslason Þorsteinsson (1925–1995) | 31 August 1965 | 10 July 1970 | 4 years, 10 months, 10 days (1,774 days) | SDP | Bjarni Benediktsson |
| (10) | Emil Jónsson (1902–1986) | 10 July 1970 | 14 July 1971 | 1 year, 4 days (369 days) | SDP | Bjarni Benediktsson |
| (10) | Emil Jónsson (1902–1986) | 10 July 1970 | 14 July 1971 | 1 year, 4 days (369 days) | SDP | Jóhann Hafstein |
| (8) | Hannibal Valdimarsson (1903–1991) | 14 July 1971 | 16 July 1973 | 2 years, 2 days (733 days) | ULL | Ólafur Jóhannesson I |
| 12 | Björn Jónsson (1916–1985) | 16 July 1973 | 6 May 1974 | 9 months, 20 days (294 days) | ULL | Ólafur Jóhannesson I |
| 13 | Magnús Torfi Ólafsson (1923–1998) | 6 May 1974 | 28 August 1974 | 3 months, 22 days (114 days) | ULL | Ólafur Jóhannesson I |
| 14 | Gunnar Thoroddsen (1910–1983) | 28 August 1974 | 1 September 1978 | 4 years, 4 days (1,465 days) | IP | Geir Hallgrímsson |
| 15 | Magnús Helgi Magnússon (1922–2006) | 1 September 1978 | 8 February 1980 | 1 year, 5 months, 7 days (525 days) | SDP | Ólafur Jóhannesson II |
| 15 | Magnús Helgi Magnússon (1922–2006) | 1 September 1978 | 8 February 1980 | 1 year, 5 months, 7 days (525 days) | SDP | Benedikt Gröndal |
| 16 | Svavar Gestsson (1944–2020) | 8 February 1980 | 26 May 1983 | 3 years, 3 months, 18 days (1203 days) | PA | Gunnar Thoroddsen |
| 17 | Alexander Stefánsson (1922–2008) | 26 May 1983 | 8 July 1987 | 4 years, 1 month, 12 days (1,504 days) | PP | Steingrímur Hermannsson I |
| 18 | Jóhanna Sigurðardóttir (1942–) | 8 July 1987 | 24 June 1994 | 6 years, 11 months, 16 days (2,543 days) | SDP | Þorsteinn Pálsson |
| 18 | Jóhanna Sigurðardóttir (1942–) | 8 July 1987 | 24 June 1994 | 6 years, 11 months, 16 days (2,543 days) | SDP | Steingrímur Hermannsson II |
| 18 | Jóhanna Sigurðardóttir (1942–) | 8 July 1987 | 24 June 1994 | 6 years, 11 months, 16 days (2,543 days) | SDP | Steingrímur Hermannsson III |
| 18 | Jóhanna Sigurðardóttir (1942–) | 8 July 1987 | 24 June 1994 | 6 years, 11 months, 16 days (2,543 days) | SDP | Davíð Oddsson I |
| 19 | Guðmundur Árni Stefánsson (1955–) | 24 June 1994 | 12 November 1994 | 4 months, 19 days (141 days) | SDP | Davíð Oddsson I |
| 20 | Rannveig Guðmundsdóttir (1940–) | 12 November 1994 | 23 April 1995 | 5 months, 11 days (162 days) | SDP | Davíð Oddsson I |
| 21 | Páll Bragi Pétursson (1937–) | 23 April 1995 | 23 May 2003 | 8 years, 1 month (2,952 days) | PP | Davíð Oddsson II |
| 21 | Páll Bragi Pétursson (1937–) | 23 April 1995 | 23 May 2003 | 8 years, 1 month (2,952 days) | PP | Davíð Oddsson III |
| 22 | Árni Magnússon (1965–) | 23 May 2003 | 7 March 2006 | 2 years, 9 months, 12 days (1,019 days) | PP | Davíð Oddsson IV |
| 22 | Árni Magnússon (1965–) | 23 May 2003 | 7 March 2006 | 2 years, 9 months, 12 days (1,019 days) | PP | Halldór Ásgrímsson |
| 23 | Jón Halldór Kristjánsson (1942–) | 7 March 2006 | 15 June 2006 | 3 months, 8 days (100 days) | PP | Halldór Ásgrímsson |
| 24 | Magnús Stefánsson (1960–) | 15 June 2006 | 24 May 2007 | 11 months, 9 days (343 days) | PP | Geir Haarde I |
| (18) | Jóhanna Sigurðardóttir (1942–) | 24 May 2007 | — | — | SDA | Geir Haarde II |

=== Minister of Social Affairs and Social Security (1 January 2008 – 31 December 2010) ===
| Nº | Minister | Took office | Left office | Duration | Party | Cabinet |
|---|---|---|---|---|---|---|
| (18) | Jóhanna Sigurðardóttir (1942–) | — | 1 February 2009 | 1 year, 8 months, 8 days (619 days) | SDA | Geir Haarde II |
| 25 | Ásta Ragnheiður Jóhannesdóttir (1949–) | 1 February 2009 | 10 May 2009 | 3 months, 9 days (98 days) | SDA | Jóhanna Sigurðardóttir I |
| 26 | Árni Páll Árnason (1966–) | 10 May 2009 | 2 September 2010 | 1 year, 3 months, 23 days (480 days) | SDA | Jóhanna Sigurðardóttir II |
| 27 | Guðbjartur Hannesson (1950–) | 2 September 2010 | 31 December 2010 | 3 months, 29 days (120 days) | SDA | Jóhanna Sigurðardóttir II |
