= Minister of Health (Iceland) =

The Minister of Health (Icelandic: Heilbrigðisráðherra) is a part of the Cabinet of Iceland. It is currently a part of the Ministry of Welfare.

== History ==
The cabinet position existed between 20 November 1959 and 1 January 1970 and again between 1 January 2008 and 31 December 2010. The Ministry of Health existed alongside the Minister after 1 January 1970, when the Cabinet of Iceland Act no. 73/1969 took effect, since ministries had not formally existed separately from the ministers. Between 1 January 1970 and 1 January 2008 the position became Minister of Health and Social Security (Icelandic: Heilbrigðis- og tryggingamálaráðherra), and the ministry itself was renamed accordingly. On 31 December 2010, the Ministry of Health was merged with the Ministry of Social Affairs and Social Security to form the Ministry of Welfare.

== List of ministers ==
=== Minister of Health (20 November 1959 – 1 January 1970) ===
Nº	Minister	Took office	Left office	Duration	Party	Cabinet
1	Bjarni Benediktsson (1908–1970)	20 November 1959	14 September 1961	1 year, 9 months, 25 days (664 days)	IP	Ólafur Thors V
2	Jóhann Hafstein (1915–1980)	14 September 1961	1 January 1962	3 months, 18 days (109 days)	IP	Ólafur Thors V
(1)	Bjarni Benediktsson (1908–1970)	1 January 1962	14 November 1963	1 year, 10 months, 13 days (682 days)	IP	Ólafur Thors V
(2)	Jóhann Hafstein (1915–1980)	14 November 1963	1 January 1970	6 years, 1 month, 18 days (2,240 days)	IP	Bjarni Benediktsson

=== Minister of Health and Social Security (1 January 1970 – 1 January 2008) ===
The Cabinet of Iceland Act no. 73/1969, which had been passed by the parliament 28 May 1969, took effect on 1 January 1970, thus the Cabinet was formally established along with its ministries, which had up until then not formally existed separately from the ministers.

Nº	Minister	Took office	Left office	Duration	Party	Cabinet
3	Eggert Gíslason Þorsteinsson (1925–1995)	1 January 1970	14 July 1971	1 year, 6 months, 13 days (559 days)	SDP	Bjarni Benediktsson
3	Eggert Gíslason Þorsteinsson (1925–1995)	1 January 1970	14 July 1971	1 year, 6 months, 13 days (559 days)	SDP	Jóhann Hafstein
4	Magnús Kjartansson (1919–1981)	14 July 1971	28 August 1974	3 years, 1 month, 14 days (1,141 days)	PA	Ólafur Jóhannesson I
5	Matthías Bjarnason (1921–2014)	28 August 1974	1 September 1978	4 years, 4 days (1,465 days)	IP	Geir Hallgrímsson
6	Magnús Helgi Magnússon (1922–2006)	1 September 1978	8 February 1980	1 year, 5 months, 7 days (525 days)	SDP	Ólafur Jóhannesson II
6	Magnús Helgi Magnússon (1922–2006)	1 September 1978	8 February 1980	1 year, 5 months, 7 days (525 days)	SDP	Benedikt Gröndal
7	Svavar Gestsson (1944–2021)	8 February 1980	26 May 1983	3 years, 3 months, 18 days (1,203 days)	PA	Gunnar Thoroddsen
(5)	Matthías Bjarnason (1921–2014)	26 May 1983	16 October 1985	2 years, 4 months, 20 days (874 days)	IP	Steingrímur Hermannsson I
8	Ragnhildur Helgadóttir (1930–2016)	16 October 1985	8 July 1987	1 year, 8 months, 22 days (630 days)	IP	Steingrímur Hermannsson I
9	Guðmundur Kristján Bjarnason (1944–)	8 July 1987	30 April 1991	3 years, 9 months, 22 days (1,392 days)	PP	Þorsteinn Pálsson
9	Guðmundur Kristján Bjarnason (1944–)	8 July 1987	30 April 1991	3 years, 9 months, 22 days (1,392 days)	PP	Steingrímur Hermannsson II
9	Guðmundur Kristján Bjarnason (1944–)	8 July 1987	30 April 1991	3 years, 9 months, 22 days (1,392 days)	PP	Steingrímur Hermannsson III
10	Sighvatur Kristinn Björgvinsson (1942–)	30 April 1991	14 June 1993	2 years, 1 month, 15 days (776 days)	SDP	Davíð Oddsson I
11	Guðmundur Árni Stefánsson (1955–)	14 June 1993	24 June 1994	1 year, 10 days (375 days)	SDP	Davíð Oddsson I
(10)	Sighvatur Kristinn Björgvinsson (1942–)	24 June 1994	23 April 1995	9 months, 30 days (303 days)	SDP	Davíð Oddsson I
12	Ingibjörg Pálmadóttir (1949–)	23 April 1995	14 April 2001	5 years, 11 months, 22 days (2,183 days)	PP	Davíð Oddsson II
12	Ingibjörg Pálmadóttir (1949–)	23 April 1995	14 April 2001	5 years, 11 months, 22 days (2,183 days)	PP	Davíð Oddsson III
13	Jón Halldór Kristjánsson (1942–)	14 April 2001	7 March 2006	4 years, 10 months, 21 days (1,788 days)	PP	Davíð Oddsson III
13	Jón Halldór Kristjánsson (1942–)	14 April 2001	7 March 2006	4 years, 10 months, 21 days (1,788 days)	PP	Davíð Oddsson IV
13	Jón Halldór Kristjánsson (1942–)	14 April 2001	7 March 2006	4 years, 10 months, 21 days (1,788 days)	PP	Halldór Ásgrímsson
14	Siv Friðleifsdóttir (1962–)	7 March 2006	24 May 2007	1 year, 2 months, 17 days (443)	PP	Halldór Ásgrímsson
14	Siv Friðleifsdóttir (1962–)	7 March 2006	24 May 2007	1 year, 2 months, 17 days (443)	PP	Geir Haarde I
15	Guðlaugur Þór Þórðarson (1967–)	24 May 2007	—	—	IP	Geir Haarde II

=== Minister of Health (1 January 2008 – 31 December 2010) ===
Nº	Minister	Took office	Left office	Duration	Party	Cabinet
(15)	Guðlaugur Þór Þórðarson (1967–)	—	1 February 2009	1 year, 8 months, 8 days (619 days)	IP	Geir Haarde II
16	Ögmundur Jónasson (1948–)	1 February 2009	1 October 2009	8 months (242 days)	LGM	Jóhanna Sigurðardóttir I
16	Ögmundur Jónasson (1948–)	1 February 2009	1 October 2009	8 months (242 days)	LGM	Jóhanna Sigurðardóttir II
17	Álfheiður Ingadóttir (1951–)	1 October 2009	2 September 2010	11 months, 1 day (336 days)	LGM	Jóhanna Sigurðardóttir II
18	Guðbjartur Hannesson (1950–2015)	2 September 2010	31 December 2010	3 months, 29 days (120 days)	SDA	Jóhanna Sigurðardóttir II

=== Minister of Health (23 May 2013 – present) ===
Nº	Minister	Took office	Left office	Duration	Party	Cabinet
19	Kristján Þór Júlíusson (1957–)	23 May 2013	11 January 2017	3 years, 7 months, 19 days (1,329 days)	IP	Sigmundur Davíð Gunnlaugsson
19	Kristján Þór Júlíusson (1957–)	23 May 2013	11 January 2017	3 years, 7 months, 19 days (1,329 days)	IP	Sigurður Ingi Jóhannsson
20	Óttarr Proppé (1968–)	11 January 2017	30 November 2017	10 months, 19 days (323 days)	BF	Bjarni Benediktsson
21	Svandís Svavarsdóttir (1964–)	30 November 2017	28 November 2021	3 years, 11 months, 29 days (1459 days)	LGM	Katrín Jakobsdóttir I
22	Willum Þór Þórsson (1960–)	28 November 2021	21 December 2024	3 years and 23 days (1,119 days)	PP	Katrín Jakobsdóttir II
22	Willum Þór Þórsson (1960–)	28 November 2021	21 December 2024	3 years and 23 days (1,119 days)	PP	Bjarni Benediktsson II
23	Alma Möller (1961–)	21 December 2024	Incumbent	1 year, 7 months and 15 days (592 days)	SDA	Kristrún Frostadóttir
