= Cabinet of Emil Jónsson =

Government of Iceland from 1958 to 1959

- 20th Cabinet of Iceland
- Date formed: 23 December 1958
- Date dissolved: 20 November 1959

People and organisations
- Head of state: Kristján Eldjárn
- Head of government: Emil Jónsson
- Member party: SDP

History
- Election: June 1959 election
- Outgoing election: October 1959 election
- Predecessor: Hermann Jónasson V
- Successor: Ólafur Thors V

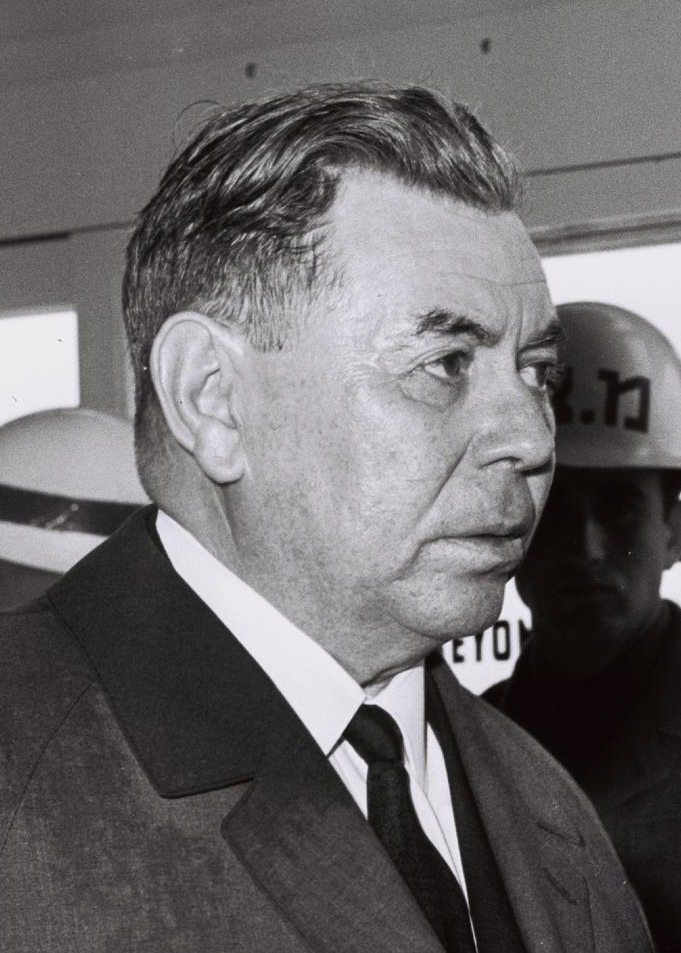
Picture of Emil Jónsson on March 21, 1966

The Cabinet of Emil Jónsson in Iceland, nicknamed “Emilía”, was formed 23 December 1958 and dissolved 20 November 1959.

== Cabinets ==
=== Inaugural cabinet: 23 December 1958 – 20 November 1959 ===
Incumbent	Minister	Party
Emil Jónsson	Prime Minister (Forsætisráðherra)	SDP
Emil Jónsson	Minister of Communications (Samgönguráðherra)	SDP
Emil Jónsson	Minister of Fisheries (Sjávarútvegsráðherra)	SDP
Friðjón Skarphéðinsson	Minister of Agriculture (Landbúnaðarráðherra)	SDP
Friðjón Skarphéðinsson	Minister of Social Affairs (Félagsmálaráðherra)	SDP
Friðjón Skarphéðinsson	Minister of Justice and Ecclesiastical Affairs (Dóms- og kirkjumálaráðherra)	SDP
Guðmundur Ívarsson Guðmundsson	Minister for Foreign Affairs (Utanríkisráðherra)	SDP
Guðmundur Ívarsson Guðmundsson	Minister of Finance (Fjármálaráðherra)	SDP
Gylfi Þorsteinsson Gíslason	Minister of Commerce (Viðskiptaráðherra)	SDP
Gylfi Þorsteinsson Gíslason	Minister of Education, Science and Culture (Menntamálaráðherra)	SDP
Gylfi Þorsteinsson Gíslason	Minister of Industry (Iðnaðarráðherra)	SDP

== See also ==
- Government of Iceland
- Cabinet of Iceland
