= Fifth cabinet of Hermann Jónasson =

Government of Iceland from July 1956 to December 1958

- 19th Cabinet of Iceland

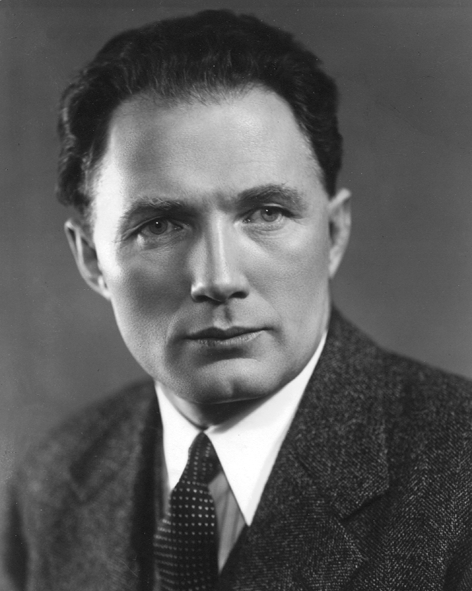
- Hermann Jónasson
- Date formed: 24 July 1956
- Date dissolved: 23 December 1958

People and organisations
- Head of state: Ásgeir Ásgeirsson; (to 1 August 1968); Kristján Eldjárn; (from 1 August 1968)
- Head of government: Emil Jónsson
- Member parties: PP—PA—SDP

History
- Predecessor: Ólafur Thors IV
- Successor: Emil Jónsson

The Fifth cabinet of Hermann Jónasson in Iceland, nicknamed “The first left government” (Icelandic: Vinstristjórn I), was formed 24 July 1956.

== Cabinets ==
=== Inaugural cabinet: 24 July 1956 – 3 August 1956 ===
Incumbent	Minister	Party
Hermann Jónasson	Prime Minister (Forsætisráðherra)	PP
Hermann Jónasson	Minister of Communications (Samgönguráðherra)	PP
Hermann Jónasson	Minister of Fisheries (Sjávarútvegsráðherra)	PP
Eysteinn Jónsson	Minister of Finance (Fjármálaráðherra)	PP
Guðmundur Ívarsson Guðmundsson	Minister for Foreign Affairs (Utanríkisráðherra)	SDP
Gylfi Þorsteinsson Gíslason	Minister of Education, Science and Culture (Menntamálaráðherra)	SDP
Gylfi Þorsteinsson Gíslason	Minister of Industry (Iðnaðarráðherra)	SDP
Hannibal Gísli Valdimarsson	Minister of Social Affairs (Félagsmálaráðherra)	PA
Lúðvík Aðalsteinn Jósepsson	Minister of Commerce (Viðskiptaráðherra)	PA
Lúðvík Aðalsteinn Jósepsson	Minister of Fisheries (Sjávarútvegsráðherra)	PA

=== First reshuffle: 3 August 1956 – 17 October 1956 ===
Emil Jónsson replaced Guðmundur Ívarsson Guðmundsson as Minister for Foreign Affairs.

Incumbent	Minister	Party
Hermann Jónasson	Prime Minister (Forsætisráðherra)	PP
Hermann Jónasson	Minister of Communications (Samgönguráðherra)	PP
Hermann Jónasson	Minister of Fisheries (Sjávarútvegsráðherra)	PP
Eysteinn Jónsson	Minister of Finance (Fjármálaráðherra)	PP
Emil Jónsson	Minister for Foreign Affairs (Utanríkisráðherra)	SDP
Gylfi Þorsteinsson Gíslason	Minister of Education, Science and Culture (Menntamálaráðherra)	SDP
Gylfi Þorsteinsson Gíslason	Minister of Industry (Iðnaðarráðherra)	SDP
Hannibal Gísli Valdimarsson	Minister of Social Affairs (Félagsmálaráðherra)	PA
Lúðvík Aðalsteinn Jósepsson	Minister of Commerce (Viðskiptaráðherra)	PA
Lúðvík Aðalsteinn Jósepsson	Minister of Fisheries (Sjávarútvegsráðherra)	PA

=== Second reshuffle: 17 October 1956 – 23 December 1958 ===
Guðmundur Ívarsson Guðmundsson replaced Emil Jónsson as Minister for Foreign Affairs.

Incumbent	Minister	Party
Hermann Jónasson	Prime Minister (Forsætisráðherra)	PP
Hermann Jónasson	Minister of Communications (Samgönguráðherra)	PP
Hermann Jónasson	Minister of Fisheries (Sjávarútvegsráðherra)	PP
Eysteinn Jónsson	Minister of Finance (Fjármálaráðherra)	PP
Guðmundur Ívarsson Guðmundsson	Minister for Foreign Affairs (Utanríkisráðherra)	SDP
Gylfi Þorsteinsson Gíslason	Minister of Education, Science and Culture (Menntamálaráðherra)	SDP
Gylfi Þorsteinsson Gíslason	Minister of Industry (Iðnaðarráðherra)	SDP
Hannibal Gísli Valdimarsson	Minister of Social Affairs (Félagsmálaráðherra)	PA
Lúðvík Aðalsteinn Jósepsson	Minister of Commerce (Viðskiptaráðherra)	PA
Lúðvík Aðalsteinn Jósepsson	Minister of Fisheries (Sjávarútvegsráðherra)	PA

== See also ==
- Government of Iceland
- Cabinet of Iceland
