= Minister for Foreign Affairs (Iceland) =

Minister for Foreign Affairs of Iceland
- Utanríkisráðherra
- Coat of arms of Iceland

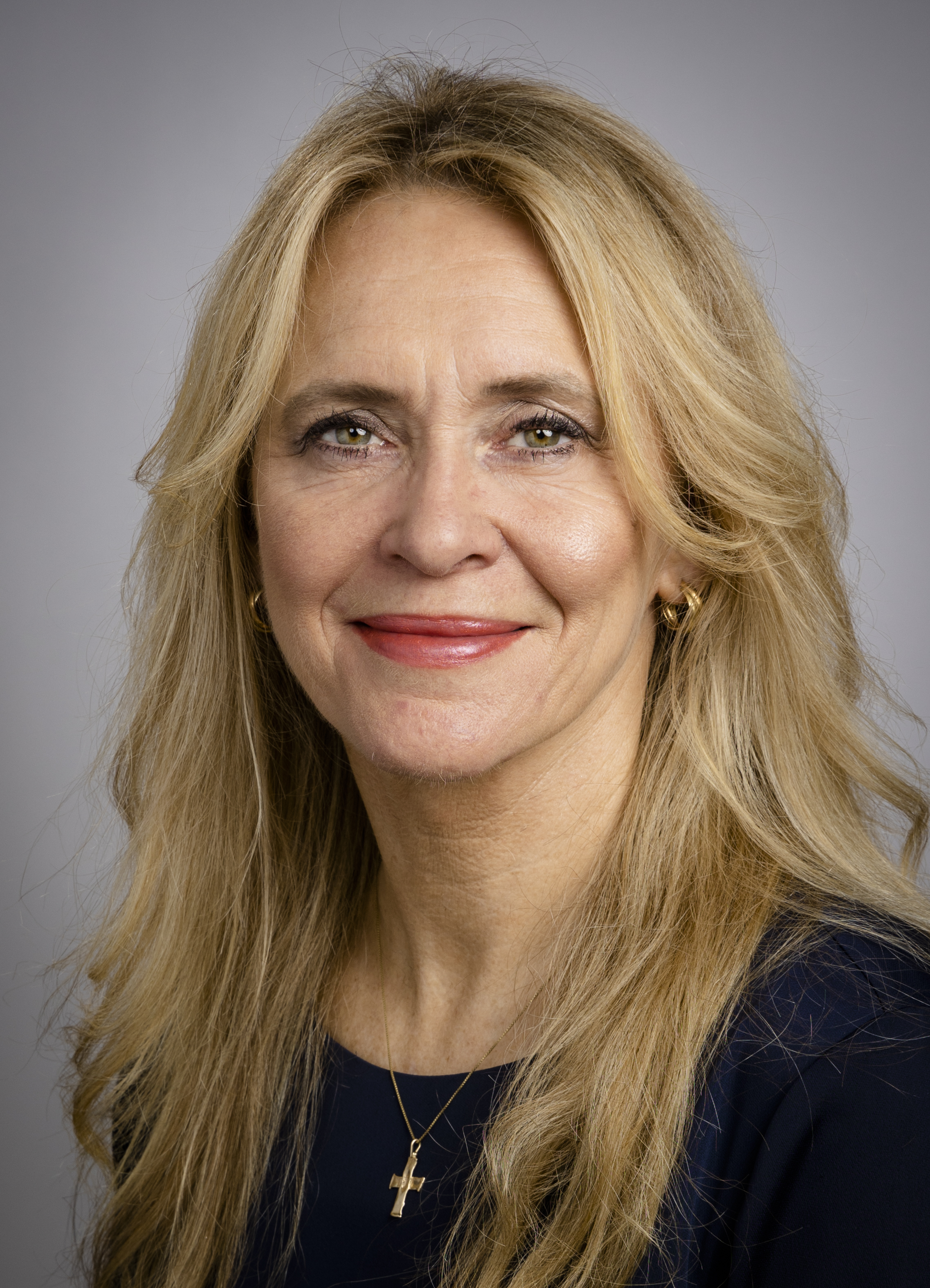
- Incumbent; Þorgerður Katrín Gunnarsdóttir since 21 December 2024
- Ministry for Foreign Affairs
- Member of: Cabinet of Iceland
- Reports to: Prime Minister
- Appointer: Prime Minister
- Constituting instrument: Constitution of Iceland
- Formation: 18 November 1941; 84 years ago
- First holder: Stefán Jóhann Stefánsson

The Minister for Foreign Affairs (Icelandic: Utanríkisráðherra) is the head of the Ministry for Foreign Affairs. The current Minister for Foreign Affairs is Þorgerður Katrín Gunnarsdóttir.

== List of ministers ==
=== Minister for Foreign Affairs (18 November 1941 – 1 January 1970) ===
No.	Portrait	Name (Birth–Death)	Term			Political party	Cabinet
No.	Portrait	Name (Birth–Death)	Took office	Left office	Time in office	Political party	Cabinet
1	Stefán Jóhann Stefánsson	Stefán Jóhann Stefánsson (1894–1980)	18 November 1941	17 January 1942	60 days	Social Democratic	Jónasson IV
No minister in office between 17 January 1942 and 16 May 1942.
2	Ólafur Thors	Ólafur Thors (1892–1964)	16 May 1942	16 December 1942	214 days	Independence	Thors I
3	Vilhjálmur Þór	Vilhjálmur Þór (1899–1972)	16 December 1942	21 October 1944	1 year, 310 days	Independent	Þórðarson
(2)	Ólafur Thors	Ólafur Thors (1892–1964)	21 October 1944	4 February 1947	2 years, 106 days	Independence	Thors II
4	Bjarni Benediktsson	Bjarni Benediktsson (1908–1970)	4 February 1947	11 September 1953	6 years, 219 days	Independence	Stefánsson; Thors III; Steinþórsson
5	Kristinn Guðmundsson	Kristinn Guðmundsson (1897–1982)	11 September 1953	24 July 1956	2 years, 317 days	Progressive	Thors IV
6	Guðmundur Ívarsson Guðmundsson	Guðmundur Ívarsson Guðmundsson (1909–1987)	24 July 1956	3 August 1956	10 days	Social Democratic	Jónasson V
7	Emil Jónsson	Emil Jónsson (1902–1986)	3 August 1956	17 October 1956	75 days	Social Democratic	Jónasson V
(6)	Guðmundur Ívarsson Guðmundsson	Guðmundur Ívarsson Guðmundsson (1909–1987)	17 October 1956	31 August 1965	8 years, 318 days	Social Democratic	Jónasson V Jónsson; Thors V Benediktsson
(7)	Emil Jónsson	Emil Jónsson (1902–1986)	31 August 1965	1 January 1970	4 years, 123 days	Social Democratic	Benediktsson

=== Minister for Foreign Affairs (1 January 1970 – present) ===
The Cabinet of Iceland Act no. 73/1969, which had been passed by the parliament 28 May 1969, took effect on 1 January 1970. Thus the Cabinet was formally established along with its ministries which had up until then not formally existed separately from the ministers.

No.	Portrait	Name (Birth–Death)	Term			Political party	Cabinet
No.	Portrait	Name (Birth–Death)	Took office	Left office	Time in office	Political party	Cabinet
(7)	Emil Jónsson	Emil Jónsson (1902–1986)	1 January 1970	14 July 1971	1 year, 194 days	Social Democratic	Benediktsson; Hafstein
8	Einar Ágústsson	Einar Ágústsson (1922–1986)	14 July 1971	1 September 1978	7 years, 49 days	Progressive	Jóhannesson I Hallgrímsson
9	Benedikt Gröndal	Benedikt Gröndal (1924–2010)	1 September 1978	8 February 1980	1 year, 160 days	Social Democratic	Jóhannesson II; Gröndal
10	Ólafur Jóhannesson	Ólafur Jóhannesson (1913–1984)	8 February 1980	26 May 1983	3 years, 107 days	Progressive	Thoroddsen
11	Geir Hallgrímsson	Geir Hallgrímsson (1925–1990)	26 May 1983	24 January 1986	2 years, 243 days	Independence	Hermannsson I
12	Matthías Árni Mathiesen	Matthías Árni Mathiesen (1931–2011)	24 January 1986	8 July 1987	1 year, 165 days	Independence	Hermannsson I
13	Steingrímur Hermannsson	Steingrímur Hermannsson (1928–2010)	8 July 1987	28 September 1988	1 year, 82 days	Progressive	Pálsson
14	Jón Baldvin Hannibalsson	Jón Baldvin Hannibalsson (born 1939)	28 September 1988	23 April 1995	6 years, 207 days	Social Democratic	Hermannsson II–III; Oddsson I
15	Halldór Ásgrímsson	Halldór Ásgrímsson (1947–2015)	23 April 1995	15 September 2004	9 years, 145 days	Progressive	Oddsson II–III–IV
16	Davíð Oddsson	Davíð Oddsson (1948–2026)	15 September 2004	27 September 2005	1 year, 12 days	Independence	Ásgrímsson
17	Geir Haarde	Geir Haarde (born 1951)	27 September 2005	15 June 2006	261 days	Independence	Ásgrímsson
18	Valgerður Sverrisdóttir	Valgerður Sverrisdóttir (born 1950)	15 June 2006	24 May 2007	343 days	Progressive	Haarde I
19	Ingibjörg Sólrún Gísladóttir	Ingibjörg Sólrún Gísladóttir (born 1954)	24 May 2007	1 February 2009	1 year, 253 days	Social Democratic	Haarde II
20	Össur Skarphéðinsson	Össur Skarphéðinsson (born 1953)	1 February 2009	23 May 2013	4 years, 111 days	Social Democratic	Sigurðardóttir I–II
21	Gunnar Bragi Sveinsson	Gunnar Bragi Sveinsson (born 1968)	23 May 2013	7 April 2016	2 years, 320 days	Progressive	Gunnlaugsson
22	Lilja Dögg Alfreðsdóttir	Lilja Dögg Alfreðsdóttir (born 1973)	7 April 2016	11 January 2017	279 days	Progressive	Jóhannsson
23	Guðlaugur Þór Þórðarson	Guðlaugur Þór Þórðarson (born 1967)	11 January 2017	28 November 2021	4 years, 321 days	Independence	Benediktsson I Jakobsdóttir
24	Þórdís Kolbrún R. Gylfadóttir	Þórdís Kolbrún R. Gylfadóttir (born 1987)	28 November 2021	14 October 2023	1 year, 320 days	Independence	Jakobsdóttir II
25	Bjarni Benediktsson	Bjarni Benediktsson (born 1970)	14 October 2023	9 April 2024	178 days	Independence	Jakobsdóttir II
(24)	Þórdís Kolbrún R. Gylfadóttir	Þórdís Kolbrún R. Gylfadóttir (born 1987)	9 April 2024	21 December 2024	256 days	Independence	Benediktsson II
26	Þorgerður Katrín Gunnarsdóttir	Þorgerður Katrín Gunnarsdóttir (born 1965)	21 December 2024	Incumbent	1 year, 260 days	Viðreisn	Frostadóttir
