= Oddsson =

Oddsson is a surname. Notable people with the surname include:

- Davíð Oddsson (1948–2026), Icelandic politician, and the longest-serving prime minister of Iceland, in office from 1991 to 2004
- Eirikr Oddsson, author of Hryggjarstykki, a lost kings' saga written in Old Norse in the mid-twelfth century
- Jón Oddsson (born 1958), Icelandic former multi-sport athlete
- Jón Oddsson Hjaltalín (1749–1835), Icelandic priest and writer

== See also ==
- First cabinet of Davíð Oddsson in Iceland was formed 30 April 1991
- Second cabinet of Davíð Oddsson in Iceland was formed 23 April 1995
- Third cabinet of Davíð Oddsson in Iceland was formed 28 May 1999
- Fourth cabinet of Davíð Oddsson in Iceland was formed 23 May 2003
