= Fifth cabinet of Ólafur Thors =

Government of Iceland from 1959 to 1963

- 21st Cabinet of Iceland

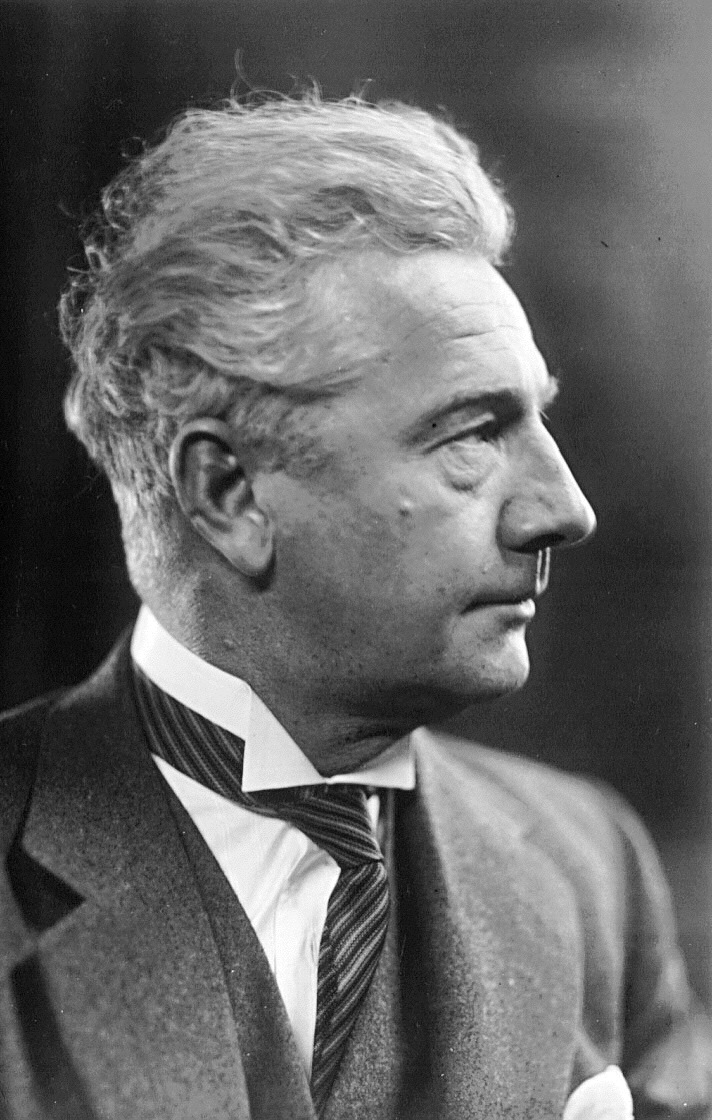
- Date formed: 20 November 1959
- Date dissolved: 14 November 1963

People and organisations
- President: Kristján Eldjárn
- Prime Minister: Ólafur Thors; Bjarni Benediktsson
- Total no. of members: 8
- Member parties: Independence Party (IP); Social Democratic Party (SDP)

History
- Outgoing election: 1963 election
- Predecessor: Emil Jónsson
- Successor: Bjarni Benediktsson

The Fifth cabinet of Ólafur Thors in Iceland, nicknamed “The restoration government” (Icelandic: Viðreisnarstjórnin), was formed 20 November 1959.

== Cabinet ==
During the first reshuffle of 14 September 1961, Bjarni Benediktsson replaced Ólafur Thors as Prime Minister. Jóhann Hafstein replaced Bjarni Benediktsson as Minister of Health and Social Security, Minister of Industry and Minister of Justice and Ecclesiastical Affairs. On 1 January 1962, the second reshuffle reverted the cabinet changes back to the original composition.

=== Composition ===
Cabinet members
Portfolio	Minister	Took office	Left office	Party
Prime Minister	Ólafur Thors	20 November 1959	14 September 1961	Independence
Prime Minister	Bjarni Benediktsson	14 September 1961	1 January 1962	Independence
Prime Minister	Ólafur Thors	1 January 1962	14 November 1963	Independence
Minister of Health, Minister of Industry and Minister of Justice & Ecclesiastical Affairs	Bjarni Benediktsson	20 November 1959	14 September 1961	Independence
Minister of Health, Minister of Industry and Minister of Justice & Ecclesiastical Affairs	Jóhann Hafstein	14 September 1961	1 January 1962	Independence
Minister of Health, Minister of Industry and Minister of Justice & Ecclesiastical Affairs	Bjarni Benediktsson	20 November 1959	14 September 1961	Independence
Minister of Fisheries and Minister of Social Affairs	Emil Jónsson	20 November 1959	14 November 1963	Social Democratic
Minister for Foreign Affairs	Guðmundur Ívarsson Guðmundsson	20 November 1959	14 November 1963	Social Democratic
Minister of Finance	Gunnar Thoroddsen	20 November 1959	14 November 1963	Independence
Minister of Education, Science and Culture and Minister of Commerce	Gylfi Þorsteinsson Gíslason	20 November 1959	14 November 1963	Social Democratic
Minister of Agriculture and Minister of Communications	Ingólfur Jónsson	20 November 1959	14 November 1963	Independence

== See also ==
- Government of Iceland
- Cabinet of Iceland
