= Ministry of Justice and Human Rights =

The Ministry of Justice and Human Rights is the Justice ministry of the following countries

- Ministry of Justice and Human Rights (Argentina)
- Ministry of Justice and Human Rights (Chile)
- Ministry of Justice and Human Rights (Iceland)
- Ministry of Justice and Human Rights (Peru)
