= Álfheiður Ingadóttir =

Icelandic politician

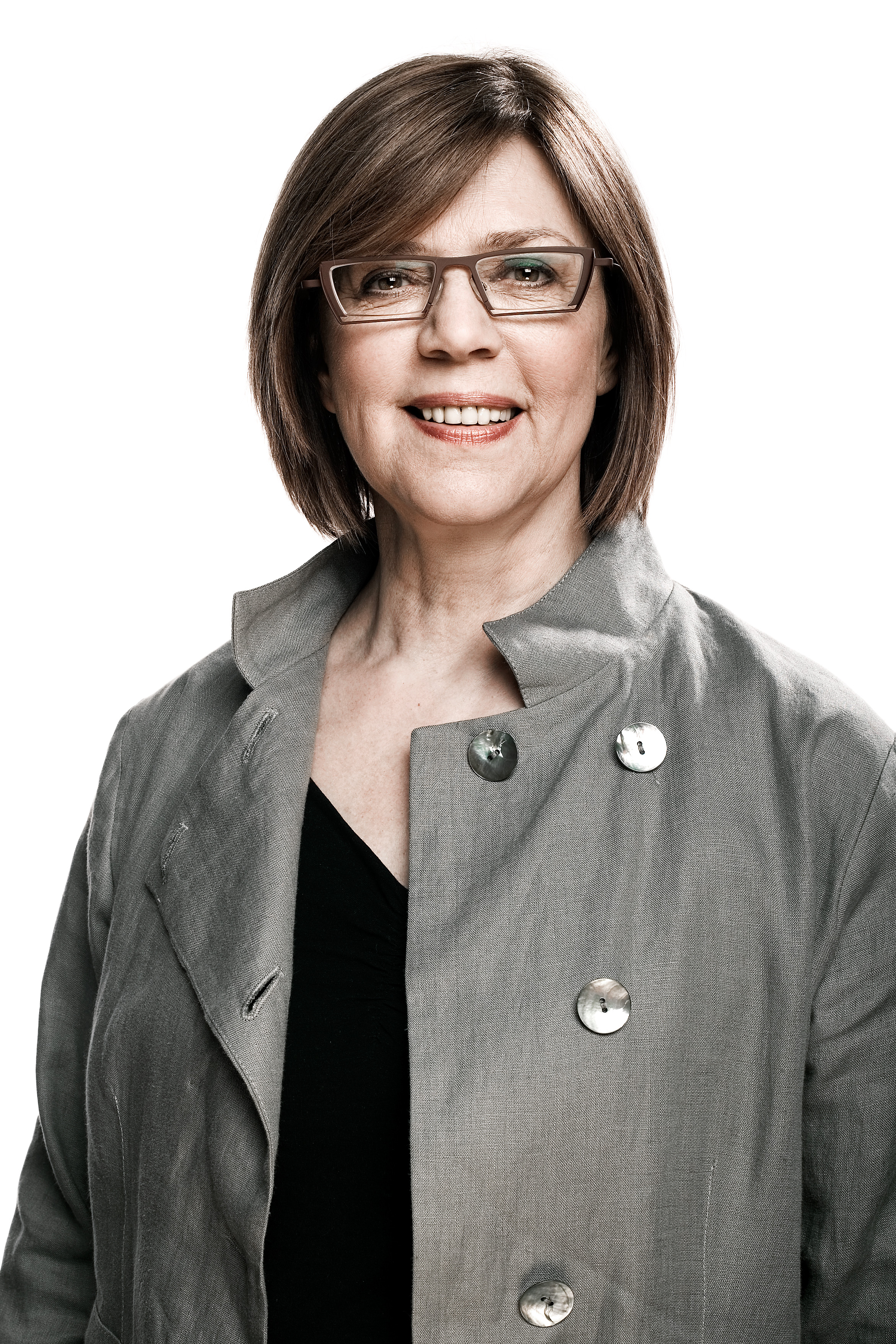

Minister of Health
- In office 1 October 2009 – 2 September 2010
- Prime Minister: Jóhanna Sigurðardóttir
- Preceded by: Ögmundur Jónasson
- Succeeded by: Guðbjartur Hannesson

Personal details
- Born: 1 May 1951 (age 74)
- Party: Left-Green Movement
- Spouse: Sigurmar Kristján Albertsson
- Children: 1

Álfheiður Ingadóttir (born 1 May 1951) is an Icelandic politician, a former member of the Althing for the Left-Green Movement, Deputy Speaker, and Minister of Health.

== Early life and education ==
Álfheiður was born in Reykjavík; her parents were Ingi R. Helgason, a lawyer of the Icelandic Supreme Court, and Ása Guðmundsdóttir. She was educated at Menntaskólinn í Reykjavík and earned a B.Sc. in biology from the University of Iceland in 1975, then studied German language and media at the Free University of Berlin in 1976–1977.

== Career ==
After teaching biology while a student, Álfheiður began her post-graduate career as a journalist at Þjóðviljinn, where she worked until 1987 and rose to news director. She then became manager of a salmon farm in Straumsvík. From 1989 to 1991 she worked on patent and trademark applications, and then returned to journalism free-lance until 1996. 1987–1989. Worked on patent applications and trademark registration 1989–1991. Freelance journalist 1991–1996. In 1994–1995 she was also the information officer of the Samtök um kvennaathvarf, a federation of women's shelters, and secretary general of the conference on women's shelters in the Nordic countries that was held in Iceland in November 1995.

She was director of publishing for the Icelandic Institute of Natural History from 1996 to 2007 and editor of Náttúrufræðingurinn, the magazine of the Icelandic Natural History Society, from 1996 to 2006.

== Political career ==
Álfheiður was elected as a Member of the Icelandic parliament, the Althing, for the Reykjavík South constituency in 2007 and for the Reykjavík North constituency in 2009. She was Deputy Speaker of the Althing in 2009 and 2010–2012. Since losing her seat in the 2013 election, she has continued to serve as a deputy member for her party.

She served as Minister of Health from October 2009 to September 2010.

She played a role in the founding of the Left-Green Movement in 1998 and was vice-chairman of its parliamentary group in 2009–2010 and 2011–2012, and chairperson from 2012 to 2013.

== Personal life ==
She is married to Sigurmar Kristján Albertsson, a lawyer of the Icelandic Supreme Court; they have a son.

Political offices
Preceded by Ögmundur Jónasson	Minister of Health; 1 October 2009 – 2 September 2010	Succeeded by Guðbjartur Hannesson
