= Cabinet of Björn Þórðarson =

Government of Iceland from 1942 to 1944

- 13th Cabinet of Iceland
- 1942–1944
- Date formed: 16 December 1942
- Date dissolved: 21 October 1944

People and organisations
- Head of state: Christian X of Denmark; Sveinn Björnsson
- Head of government: Björn Þórðarson
- Member party: caretaker government

History
- Predecessor: First cabinet of Ólafur Thors
- Successor: Second cabinet of Ólafur Thors

The Cabinet of Björn Þórðarson, nicknamed “The caretaker government” (Icelandic: Utanþingsstjórnin) or “The Coca-Cola government” (Icelandic: Kóka kóla stjórnin), was formed 16 December 1942.

== Cabinets ==
=== Inaugural cabinet ===
Officeholder	Office
Björn Þórðarson	Prime Minister
Björn Ólafsson	Minister of Finance and Business Affairs
Einar Arnórsson	Minister of Justice
Vilhjálmur Þór	Minister for Foreign Affairs and Employment

=== Change (22 December 1942) ===
Officeholder	Office
Björn Þórðarson	Prime Minister
Björn Ólafsson	Minister of Finance and Business Affairs
Einar Arnórsson	Minister of Justice
Jóhann Sæmundsson	Minister of Social Affairs
Vilhjálmur Þór	Minister for Foreign Affairs and Employment

=== Change (19 April 1943) ===
Officeholder	Office
Björn Þórðarson	Prime Minister
Björn Þórðarson	Minister of Social Affairs
Björn Ólafsson	Minister of Finance and Business Affairs
Einar Arnórsson	Minister of Justice
Vilhjálmur Þór	Minister for Foreign Affairs and Employment
