= Minister of Statistics Iceland =

The Minister of Statistics Iceland (Icelandic: Ráðherra Hagstofu Íslands) was the head of Statistics Iceland from 1 January 1970, when the Cabinet of Iceland Act no. 73/1969 took effect, to 1 January 2008, when Statistics Iceland became an independent government agency.

== List of ministers ==
Nº	Minister	Took office	Left office	Duration	Party	Cabinet
1	Magnús Jónsson (1919–1984)	1 January 1970	10 July 1970	1 years, 6 month, 13 days (559 days)	IP	Bjarni Benediktsson
1	Magnús Jónsson (1919–1984)	10 July 1970	14 July 1971	1 years, 6 month, 13 days (559 days)	IP	Jóhann Hafstein
2	Magnús Torfi Ólafsson (1923–1998)	14 July 1971	28 August 1974	3 years, 1 month, 14 days (1141 days)	ULL	Ólafur Jóhannesson I
3	Geir Hallgrímsson (1925–1990)	28 August 1974	1 September 1978	4 years, 4 days (1465 days)	IP	Geir Hallgrímsson
4	Ólafur Jóhannesson (1913–1984)	1 September 1978	15 October 1979	1 year, 1 month, 14 days (409 days)	PP	Ólafur Jóhannesson II
5	Sighvatur Kristinn Björgvinsson (1942–)	15 October 1979	8 February 1980	3 months, 24 days (116 days)	SDP	Benedikt Gröndal
6	Gunnar Thoroddsen (1910–1983)	8 February 1980	26 May 1983	3 years, 3 months, 18 days (1203 days)	IP	Gunnar Thoroddsen
7	Matthías Árni Mathiesen (1931–2011)	26 May 1983	16 October 1985	2 years, 4 months, 20 days (874 days)	IP	Steingrímur Hermannsson I
8	Þorsteinn Pálsson (1947–)	16 October 1985	8 July 1987	1 years, 8 months, 22 days (630 days)	IP	Steingrímur Hermannsson I
9	Jón Sigurðsson (1941–)	8 July 1987	28 September 1988	1 year, 2 months, 20 days (448 days)	SDP	Þorsteinn Pálsson
10	Steingrímur Hermannsson (1928–2010)	28 September 1988	10 September 1989	11 months, 13 days (347 days)	PP	Steingrímur Hermannsson II
11	Edvard Júlíus Sólnes (1937–)	10 September 1989	23 February 1990	5 months, 13 days (166 days)	CP	Steingrímur Hermannsson III
(10)	Steingrímur Hermannsson (1928–2010)	23 February 1990	30 April 1991	1 year, 2 months, 7 days (431 days)	PP	Steingrímur Hermannsson III
12	Davíð Oddsson (1948–)	30 April 1991	23 April 1995	14 years, 4 months, 28 days (5264 days)	IP	Davíð Oddsson I
12	Davíð Oddsson (1948–)	23 April 1995	28 May 1999	14 years, 4 months, 28 days (5264 days)	IP	Davíð Oddsson II
12	Davíð Oddsson (1948–)	28 May 1999	23 May 2003	14 years, 4 months, 28 days (5264 days)	IP	Davíð Oddsson III
12	Davíð Oddsson (1948–)	23 May 2003	15 September 2004	14 years, 4 months, 28 days (5264 days)	IP	Davíð Oddsson IV
12	Davíð Oddsson (1948–)	15 September 2004	27 September 2005	14 years, 4 months, 28 days (5264 days)	IP	Halldór Ásgrímsson
13	Halldór Ásgrímsson (1947–)	27 September 2005	15 June 2006	8 months, 19 days (261 days)	PP	Halldór Ásgrímsson
14	Geir Haarde (1951–)	15 June 2006	24 May 2007	1 year, 6 months, 17 days (565 days)	IP	Geir Haarde I
14	Geir Haarde (1951–)	24 May 2007	1 January 2008	1 year, 6 months, 17 days (565 days)	IP	Geir Haarde II
