= Guðbjartur Hannesson =

Icelandic politician (1950–2015)

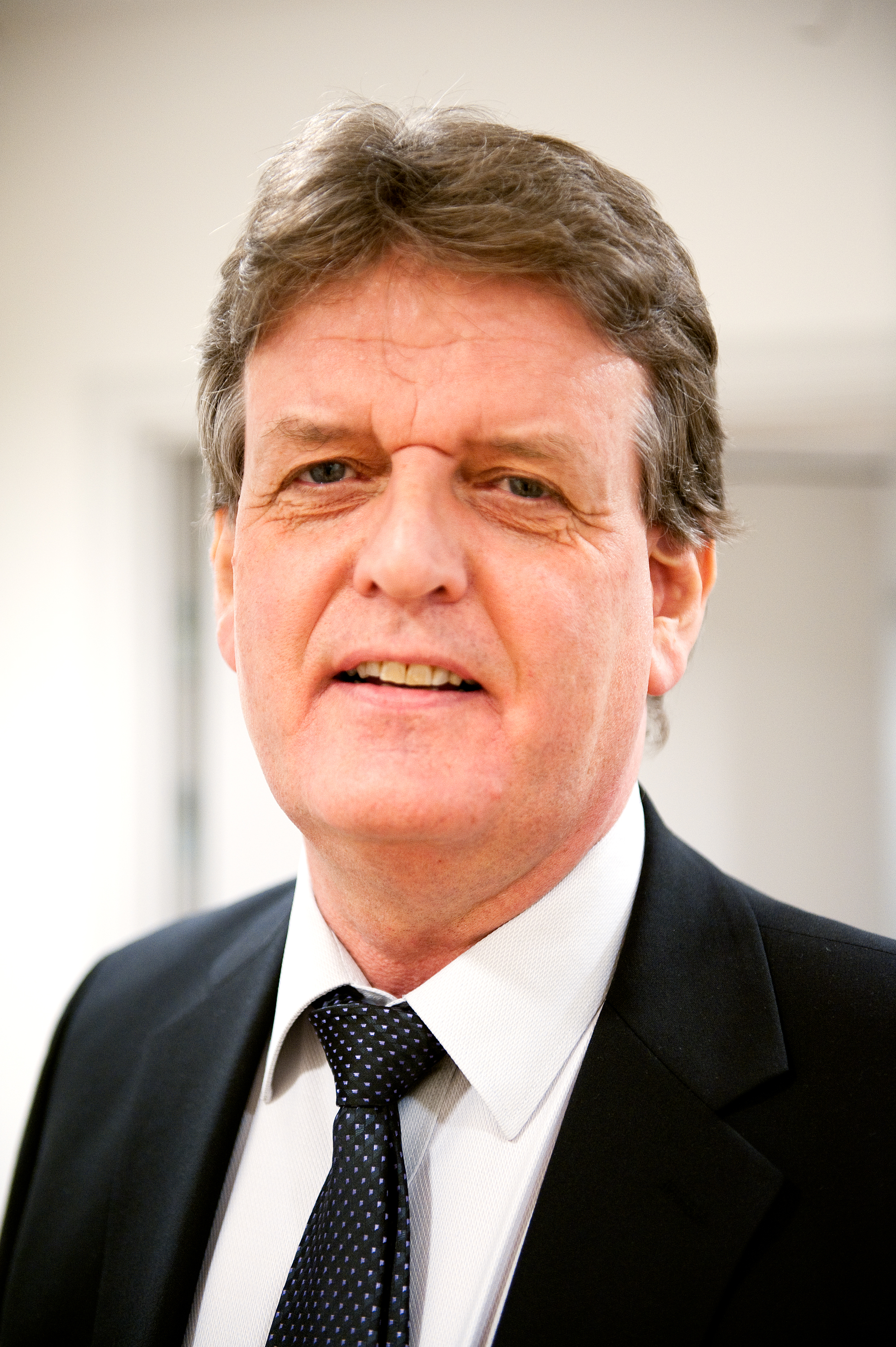

Minister of Health
- In office 2 September 2010 – 31 December 2010
- Prime Minister: Jóhanna Sigurðardóttir
- Preceded by: Álfheiður Ingadóttir
- Succeeded by: Kristján Þór Júlíusson

Personal details
- Born: 3 June 1950 Akranes, Iceland
- Died: 23 October 2015 (aged 65) Akranes, Iceland
- Party: Social Democratic Alliance

Guðbjartur Hannesson (3 June 1950 – 23 October 2015) was an Icelandic politician and was welfare minister. He was affiliated with the Social Democratic Alliance (Samfylkingin).

He won a seat in parliament for the Social Democratic Alliance in 2007. He served as speaker of the Althing in 2009. In September 2010 he was appointed Minister for Social Affairs and Health and was charged with merging his department with the Ministry of Labour and create a new Ministry for Welfare from January 2011.

After the parliamentary election 27 April 2013 there was a change of government and on 23 May Eygló Harðardóttir became the new welfare minister, while Kristjáni Þór Júlíussyni became minister of Health. He died on 23 October 2015 from cancer.

Political offices
Preceded by Álfheiður Ingadóttir	Minister of Health; 2 September 2010 – 31 December 2010	Succeeded by Kristján Þór Júlíusson
Preceded by Árni Páll Árnason	Social Affairs and Social Security; 2 September 2010 – 31 December 2010	Succeeded by no one
Preceded by no one	Minister of Welfare; 1 January 2011 – 23 May 2013	Succeeded by Kristján Þór Júlíusson; Minister of Health; Eygló Harðardóttir; Minister of Social Affairs and Housing
