= First cabinet of Ólafur Thors =

Government of Iceland in 1942

- 12th Cabinet of Iceland
- 1942
- Date formed: 16 May 1942
- Date dissolved: 16 December 1942

People and organisations
- Head of state: Christian X of Denmark (de jure); Regent Sveinn Björnsson (de facto)
- Head of government: Ólafur Thors
- Member party: Independence Party

History
- Election: July 1942 election
- Outgoing election: October 1942 election
- Predecessor: Fourth cabinet of Hermann Jónasson
- Successor: Cabinet of Björn Þórðarson

The First cabinet of Ólafur Thors, nicknamed “Ólafía I”, was formed on 16 May 1942.

== Cabinet ==
=== Inaugural cabinet ===
Officeholder	Office
Ólafur Thors	Prime Minister
Ólafur Thors	Minister for Foreign Affairs
Jakob Möller	Minister of Finance and Justice
Magnús Jónsson	Minister of Employment and Business Affairs
