= Ingibjörg Pálmadóttir =

Icelandic politician (born 1949)

Ingibjörg Pálmadóttir (born 18 February 1949) is an Icelandic politician and former minister. She served as the Minister of Health from 28 May 1999 to 14 April 2001 in the 3rd Government of Davíð Oddsson.
