= Friðjón Skarphéðinsson =

Icelandic politician (1909–1996)

Friðjón Skarphéðinsson (15 April 1909 – 31 March 1996) was an Icelandic politician and former minister for social affairs from December 1958 to November 1959. He served as speaker of the Althing from 1959 to 1963.
