= Sturla Böðvarsson =

Icelandic politician (1945–2026)

President of the Althing
- In office 2007–2009
- President: Ólafur Ragnar Grímsson
- Preceded by: Sólveig Pétursdóttir

Minister of Communications and Transportation
- In office 1999–2007
- Prime Minister: Davíð Oddsson; Halldór Ásgrímsson; Geir Haarde
- Preceded by: Halldór Blöndal
- Succeeded by: Kristján L. Möller (as Minister of Communications)

Personal details
- Born: 23 November 1945
- Died: 10 January 2026 (aged 80)
- Party: Independence Party

Sturla Böðvarsson (23 November 1945 – 10 January 2026) was an Icelandic politician who was President of the Althing between 2007 and 2009. He was a member of the Independence Party and was a member of the Althing from 1991, from the Western Constituency from 1991 to 2003 and from the North West Constituency from 2003. From 1999 to 2007, he was Minister of Communications. He was also the mayor of Stykkishólmur from 1974 to 1991 and again from 2014. Böðvarsson died on 10 January 2026, at the age of 80.

Political offices
Preceded by Sólveig Pétursdóttir	President of the Althing; 2007–2013	Succeeded by Einar Kristinn Guðfinnsson
Preceded by Halldór Blöndal	Minister of Communications and Transportation; 1999–2007	Succeeded by Kristján L. Möller as Minister of Communications
