= Tómas Ingi Olrich =

Icelandic politician (born 1943)

Tómas Ingi Olrich (born 13 February 1943) is an Icelandic politician and former minister and ambassador.

== Early life and education ==
Tómas was born in Akureyri and educated at the University of Iceland, where he studied French and history, and the University of Montpellier, where he earned a licentiate and a master's degree in modern languages.

== Career ==
He taught at Akureyri Junior College from 1970 to 1991, including ten years as assistant schoolmaster. During some of that time he was also manager of the Hotel Edda in Akureyri (1971–1973) and editor of the website of the Independence Party, Íslendingur (1984–1985).

He served in the Icelandic parliament, Alþingi, from 1991 to 2003 representing Northeastern and in 2003 representing the new constituency of Northeast, for the Independence Party. During this time he was twice part of the Icelandic delegation to the NATO Parliamentary Assembly, in 1991–1993 and, as chairman, in 1999–2002, chaired the Icelandic delegation to the Organization for Security and Co-operation in Europe in 1993–1995, and was Iceland's representative to the Council of Europe in 1995. He then served as Minister of Education from 2 March 2002 to 31 December 2003.

After resigning his parliamentary seat, he became ambassador to France, serving from 2005 until the end of 2009.

Among his other positions, Tómas chaired the planning committee for the University of Akureyri from 1985 to 1987 and was on the board of governors from 1988 to 1990, and from 1999 to 2002 was on the permanent committee of the Arctic Council. He was vice president of the Icelandic Tourist Board from 1993 to 1999 and then became its chairman.

== Private life ==
Tómas has been married twice, to Hjördís Daníelsdóttir in 1964 and to Nína Þórðardóttir in 1981. He has two daughters from his first marriage, and Nína has two daughters from a previous marriage.
