= Árni Magnússon (politician) =

Icelandic politician (born 1965)

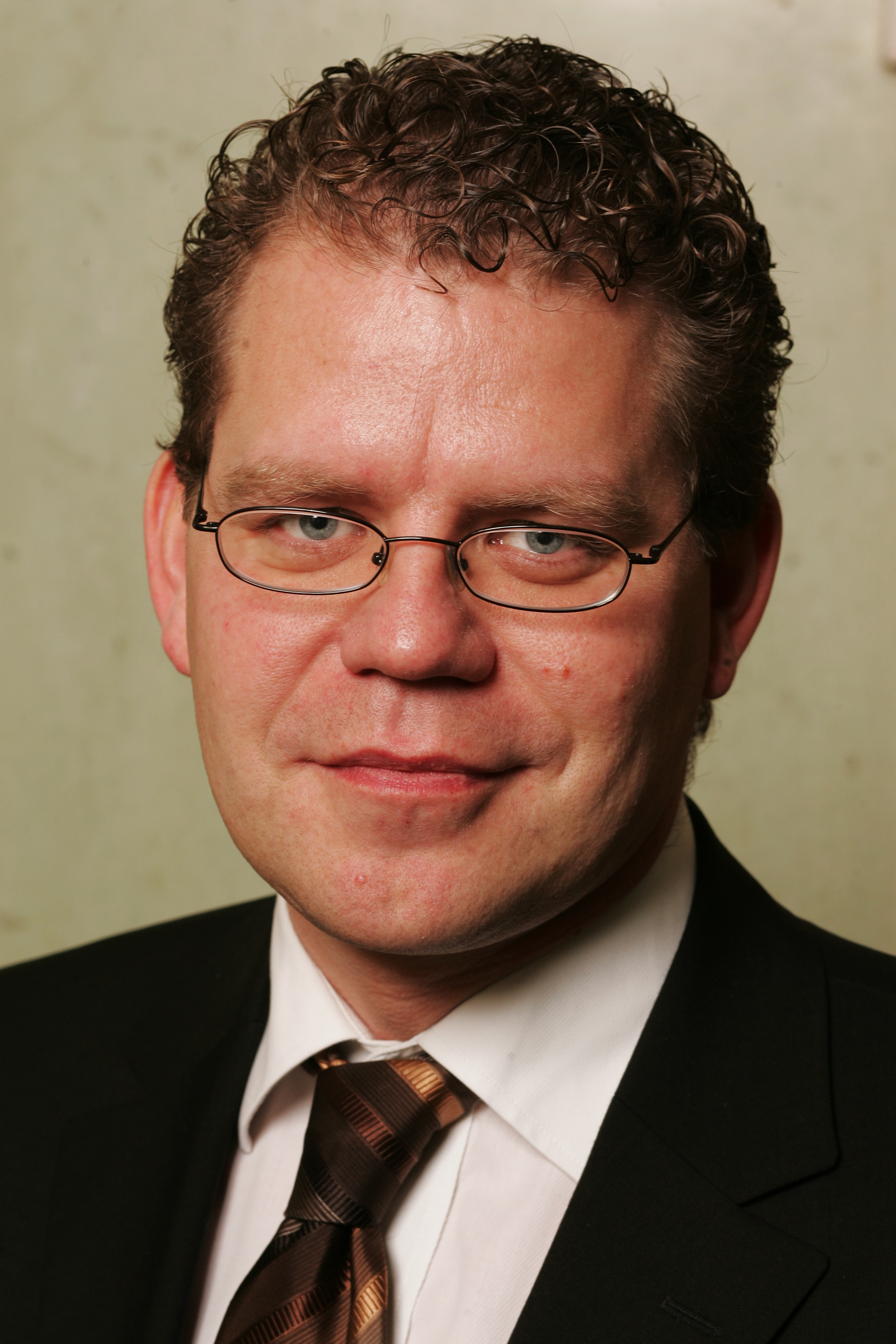

Árni Magnússon (Icelandic pronunciation: [ˈau(r)tnɪ ˈmaknusˌsɔːn]; born 4 June 1965) is an Icelandic politician and former minister for social affairs from May 2003 to March 2006.
