= Fourth cabinet of Hermann Jónasson =

Government of Iceland from 1941 to 1942

- 11th Cabinet of Iceland
- 1941–1942
- Date formed: 18 November 1941
- Date dissolved: 16 May 1942

People and organisations
- Head of state: Christian X of Denmark (de jure); Regent Sveinn Björnsson (de facto)
- Head of government: Hermann Jónasson
- Member parties: Progressive Party; Independence Party; Social Democratic Party

History
- Predecessor: Third cabinet of Hermann Jónasson
- Successor: First cabinet of Ólafur Thors

The Fourth cabinet of Hermann Jónasson, nicknamed “The National Government” (Icelandic: Þjóðstjórnin), was a government of the independent state of Iceland, which seceded from Denmark with the Danish–Icelandic Act of Union, but was subordinate to the joint king of the Kingdom of Denmark and the Kingdom of Iceland, Christian X. It was formed on 18 November 1941 and replaced the Third cabinet of Hermann Jónasson. It remained in office until 16 May 1942, when it was replaced by the First cabinet of Ólafur Thors. The cabinet included members of the Progressive Party (Framsóknarflokkurinn), the Independence Party (Sjálfstæðisflokkurinn) and the Social Democratic Party of Iceland (Alþýðuflokkurinn).

== Cabinets ==
=== Inaugural cabinet ===
Officeholder	Office
Hermann Jónasson	Prime Minister
Hermann Jónasson	Minister of Justice and Ecclesiastical Affairs
Eysteinn Jónsson	Minister of Business Affairs
Jakob Möller	Minister of Finance
Ólafur Thors	Minister of Employment and Transport
Stefán Jóhann Stefánsson	Minister for Foreign and Social Affairs

=== Change (17 January 1942) ===
Officeholder	Office
Hermann Jónasson	Prime Minister
Hermann Jónasson	Minister of Justice and Ecclesiastical Affairs
Eysteinn Jónsson	Minister of Business Affairs
Jakob Möller	Minister of Finance
Ólafur Thors	Minister of Employment and Transport
