= Magnús Helgi Magnússon =

Icelandic politician

Magnús Helgi Magnússon (30 September 1922 – 22 August 2006) was an Icelandic politician and former minister for social affairs from September 1978 to February 1980.
