= Björn Þórðarson =

Prime Minister of Iceland (1879–1963)

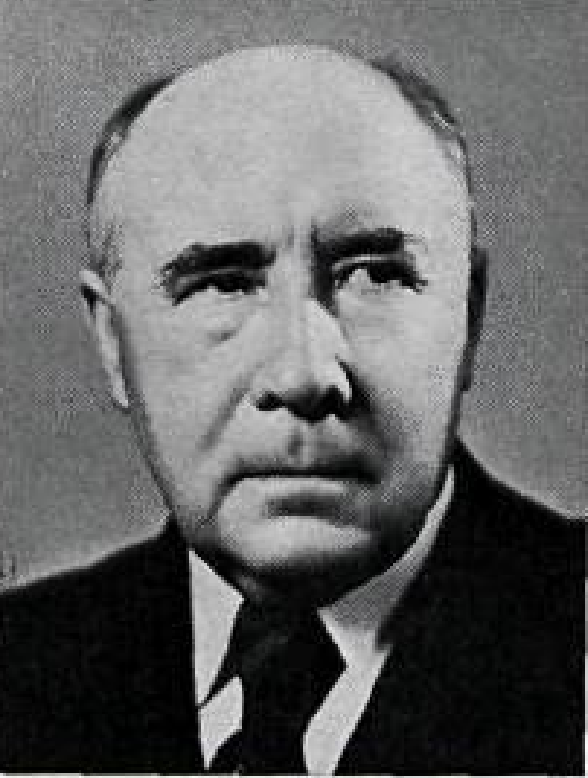

13th Prime Minister of Iceland
- In office 16 December 1942 – 21 October 1944
- Monarchs: Christian X (1942–1944); Regent Sveinn Björnsson (1944)
- President: Sveinn Björnsson
- Preceded by: Ólafur Thors
- Succeeded by: Ólafur Thors

Personal details
- Born: 6 February 1879 Móar, Kjalarnes, Iceland
- Died: 25 October 1963 (aged 84) Reykjavík, Iceland
- Party: Independent

Björn Þórðarson (Icelandic pronunciation: [ˈpjœrtn̥ ˈθourðarsɔn̥]; 6 February 1879 – 25 October 1963) was prime minister of Iceland from 16 December 1942 to 21 October 1944, in the only government that did not rely on parliamentary support. He was prime minister when Iceland became a republic. His cabinet was named the Coca-Cola rule because two of its ministers started franchises of two big American companies during the US occupation during World War II. Vilhjálmur Þór, from the Progressive Party, took on Esso, and Björn Ólafsson, later a member of the Alþingi, founded Vífilfell, the company that sells Coca-Cola in Iceland.

Preceded by Ólafur Thors	Prime Minister of Iceland; 1942–1944	Succeeded by Ólafur Thors
