= Jón Halldór Kristjánsson =

Icelandic politician

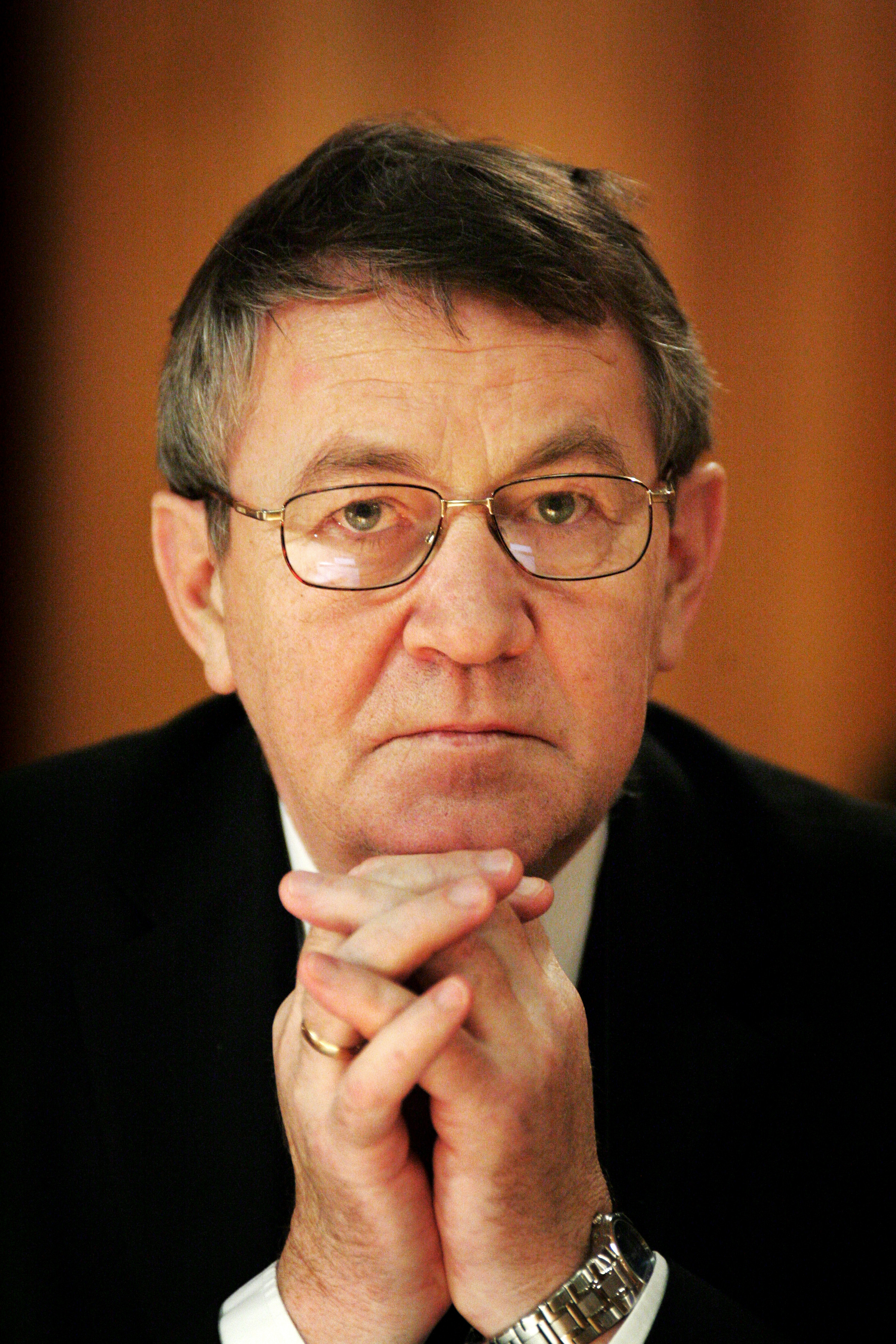
- Born: 11 June 1942 (age 83)
- Occupation: politician
- Known for: Minister of Social Affairs

Jón Halldór Kristjánsson (born 11 June 1942) is an Icelandic politician and former Minister of Social Affairs.
