= Ministry of Justice and Human Rights (Iceland) =

Government ministry of Iceland

The Icelandic Ministry of Justice and Human Rights (Icelandic: Dómsmála- og Mannréttindaráðuneytið) was a cabinet-level ministry within the government of Iceland. Beginning on 2 September 2010, the minister was Ögmundur Jónasson. Before that date, the ministry had been known as the Ministry of Justice and Ecclesiastical Affairs. In 2011 it was merged with the Ministry of Transport, Communications and Local Government, to form the Ministry of the Interior. On 1 May 2017 the Ministry of the Interior was split again, into the Ministry of Justice and the Ministry of Transport and Local Government.

The department handles a wide variety of issues that include civil defense, public prosecution, the justice system including sentencing, immigration, police and coast guard, and elections.

== List of ministers ==
=== Ministers of Justice, Church and Human Rights (1904-2010) ===
Since Iceland received the Cabinet of Ministers in 1904, the Minister of Justice and the Ministry of Justice went to the ministers in 1917.

Minister	from	to	Category	other
Hannes Hafstein	1904	1909		Minister for Iceland
Björn Jónsson	1909	1911		
Kristján Jónsson	1911	1912		
Hannes Hafstein	1912	1914		
Sigurður Eggerz	1914	1915		
Einar Arnórsson	1915	1917		
Jón Magnússon	1917	1922		First Minister of Justice and Ecclesiastical Affairs
Sigurður Eggerz	1922	1924		
Jón Magnússon	1924	1926		
Magnús Guðmundsson	1926	1927		
Jonas from Hriflu	1927	1931		
Tryggvi Thorhallsson	1931	1931		
Jonas from Hriflu	1931	1932		
Magnús Guðmundsson	1932	1932		Minister of Justice and Ecclesiastical Affairs (mid-1931); Attorney General (late 1932)
Thorsteinn Briem	1932	1932		Only Attorney General
Thorsteinn Briem	1932	1934		Only Minister of Ecclesiastical Affairs
Magnús Guðmundsson	1932	1934		Only Attorney General
Hermann Jónasson	1934	1942		
Magnús Jónsson	1942	1942		Only Minister of Ecclesiastical Affairs
Jakob Möller	1942	1942		Only Attorney General
Jakob Möller	1942	1942		Only Attorney General
Björn Þórðarson	1942	1944		Only Minister of Ecclesiastical Affairs
Einar Arnórsson	1942	1944		Only Attorney General
Björn Þórðarson	1944	1944		

Minister	from	to	Category	Ministry	other
Emil Jonsson	1944	1947	Social Democratic Party	Another ministry of Ólafur Thors	Only Minister of Ecclesiastical Affairs
Finnur Jónsson	1944	1947		Another ministry of Ólafur Thors	Only Attorney General
Eysteinn Jónsson	1947	1949		The Ministry of Stefán Jóhann Stefánsson	Only Minister of Ecclesiastical Affairs
Bjarni Benediktsson	1947	1949	Independence	The Ministry of Stefán Jóhann Stefánsson	Only Attorney General
Bjarni Benediktsson	1949	1950	Independence	Olaf Thors third ministry	
Hermann Jónasson	1950	1953	Progressives	Steingrímur Steinþórsson's ministry	Only Minister of Ecclesiastical Affairs
Bjarni Benediktsson	1950	1956	Independence	Steingrímur Steinþórsson's ministry Olaf Thors fourth ministry	Only Attorney General
Steingrímur Steinþórsson	1953	1956		Olaf Thors fourth ministry	Only Minister of Ecclesiastical Affairs
Hermann Jónasson	1956	1958	Progressives	The third ministry of Hermann Jónasson	
Friðjón Skarphéðinsson	1958	1959		The Ministry of Emil Jonsson	
Bjarni Benediktsson	1959	1963	Independence	The fifth ministry of Ólafur Thors	
Jóhann Hafstein	1963	1970	Independence	Ministry of Bjarni Benediktsson	
Auður Auðuns [1st female]	1970	1971		The Ministry of Jóhann Hafstein	
Ólafur Jóhannesson	1971	1978	Progressives	The first ministry of Ólafur Jóhannesson The Ministry of Geir Hallgrímsson	
Steingrímur Hermannsson	1978	1979	Progressives	Another ministry of Ólafur Jóhannesson	
Vilmundur Gylfason	1979	1980	Social Democratic Party	Ministry of Benedikt Gröndal	
Fridrið Thordarson	1980	1983		Gunnars Thoroddsen's Ministry	
Jón Helgason	1983	1987		The first ministry of Steingrím Hermannsson	
Jón Sigurðsson	1987	1988	Social Democratic Party	The Ministry of Þorsteinn Pálsson	
Halldór Ásgrímsson	1988	1989	Progressives	The second ministry of Steingrím Hermannsson	
Oli Þ. Guðbjartsson	1989	1991		The third ministry of Steingrím Hermannsson	
Þorsteinn Pálsson	1991	1999	Independence	The first ministry of David Oddsson Another ministry of David Oddsson	
David Oddsson	1999	1999	Independence	Another ministry of David Oddsson	
Sólveig Pétursdóttir	1999	2003		The Third Ministry of David Oddsson	
Björn Bjarnason	2003	2009	Independence	David Oddsson's fourth ministry The Ministry of Halldór Ásgrímsson The first ministry of Geir Haarde Other ministry of Geir Haarde	
Ragna Árnadóttir	2009	2010	Off-Minister	The first ministry of Jóhanna Sigurðardóttir Another ministry of Jóhanna Sigurðardóttir	Ministry of Justice and Human Rights (late 2009)
Ögmundur Jónasson	2010	2010	Left-wing movement - green supply	Another ministry of Jóhanna Sigurðardóttir	Ministry of Justice and Human Rights

=== Ministers of Interior (2011-2017) ===
Minister	from	to	Category	Ministry	other
Ögmundur Jónasson	2011	2013	Left-wing movement - green supply	Another ministry of Jóhanna Sigurðardóttir	
Hanna Birna Kristjánsdóttir	2013	2014	Independence	The Ministry of Sigmund Davíð Gunnlaugsson	Resigned on 21 November 2014 and resigned on 4 December of the same year.
Sigmundur David Gunnlaugsson	2014	2014	Progressives	The Ministry of Sigmund Davíð Gunnlaugsson	Only Attorney General from 27 August to 4 December 2014
Ólöf Nordal	2014	2017	Off-Minister	The Ministry of Sigmund Davíð Gunnlaugsson	

=== Ministers of Justice (2017 - ) ===
Minister	from	to	Category	other
Þórdís Kolbrún R. Gylfadóttir	2019	2019	Independence	
Áslaug Arna Sigurbjörnsdóttir	2019	2021	Independence	
Jón Gunnarsson	2022		Independence	

=== Attorney General ===
Attorney General	from	to	Category	Ministry	other
Minister of Interior
Sigríður Ásthildur Andersen	2017	still in office	Independence	The Ministry of Bjarni Benediktsson (2017) The Ministry of Katrina Jakobsdóttir (2017-)	

== See also ==
- Justice ministry
- Innanríkisráðherra Íslands (Minister of the Interior of Iceland)
- Politics of Iceland
