= Statistics Iceland =

National statistical service of Iceland

- Hagstofa Íslands
- Logo

Agency overview
- Formed: 1914
- Jurisdiction: Iceland
- Headquarters: Reykjavík, Iceland
- Employees: 158 (2009)
- Minister responsible: Kristrún Frostadóttir, Prime Minister
- Agency executive: Hrafnhildur Arnkelsdóttir, Director-general
- Website: statice.is (in English) hagstofa.is (in Icelandic)

Statistics Iceland (Icelandic: Hagstofa Íslands) is the main official institute providing statistics on the nation of Iceland. It was created by the Althing in 1913, began operations in 1914 and became an independent government agency under the Prime Minister's Office on 1 January 2008.

== See also ==
- Minister of Statistics Iceland
