= Ministry of Communications (Iceland) =

Government ministry of Iceland

Coordinates: 64°08′56″N 21°56′25″W

The Icelandic Ministry of Communications (Icelandic: Samgönguráðuneytið) was a cabinet-level ministry responsible for transport by land, sea and air, as well as telecommunications and postal services. Since September 2010, the minister had been Ögmundur Jónasson of the Left-Green Movement. Various organisational changes has taken effect in the Ministry of Transport, Communications and Municipal Affairs. A number of projects have been transferred to the Ministry, which has expanded its staff by 8 employees to a total of 36.

The work of the Ministry covered i.a. the preparation of drafts of legislative proposals for parliamentary purposes, drafting of regulations, issue of work permits and professional licences, publication of reports and information dissemination. International co-operation is also an important feature of Ministry operations.

Under the auspices of the Ministry were: The Public Road Administration (Vegagerðin), the Road Accident Analysis Group, the Icelandic Maritime Administration, the Icelandic Civil Aviation Administration, Marine Accident Investigation Board, Aircraft Accident Investigation Board, the Post and Telecom Administration, Equalization Fund, and Keflavik Airport Ltd.

The Ministry was divided into four departments:

- The Department of Administrative and Financial Affairs
- The Department of Communications
- The Department of Municipalities and Equalization Fund
- The Department of Transportation

In 2011, the Ministry was merged with the Ministry of Justice and Human Rights to form the Ministry of Interior.

== Responsible for ==
- Planning of land, air and sea transport operations.
- Roads and road construction.
- Surface transportation and vehicle monitoring.
- Aviation and airports.
- Navigation and legal registration of seamen and their occupational rights.
- Lighthouses, harbours and breakwaters.
- Safety in transportation and accident investigation.
- Telecommunications.
- Postal services.
- Municipal affairs.
- Equalization Fund.
