= Ministry of Welfare (Iceland) =

Government ministry of Iceland

The Ministry of Welfare (Icelandic: Velferðarráðuneytið) is an Icelandic cabinet-level ministry founded 1 January 2011. It is the result of the merger of the Ministry of Social Affairs and Social Security, founded 17 April 1939 as the Ministry of Social Affairs and the Ministry of Health, founded 20 November 1959. It is responsible for administration and policy making of social affairs, health and social security. The first Minister of Welfare was Guðbjartur Hannesson. As of November 2017, there are two ministers heading the Ministry of Welfare: Ásmundur Einar Daðason, Minister of Social Affairs and Equality, and Svandís Svavarsdóttir, Minister of Health.

== See also ==
- Directorate of Health
- Minister of Welfare
- Welfare Committee
