= Ministry of Business Affairs (Iceland) =

Government ministry of Iceland

Coordinates: 64°08′55″N 21°55′52″W

The Icelandic Ministry of Business Affairs (Icelandic: Viðskiptaráðuneytið), also translated as the Ministry of Commerce or Ministry of Trade, is a government ministry established on 24 May 2007, when it was split off from the Ministry of Industry and Commerce. The ministry is responsible for company law, competition law, financial services, insurance and trade (both domestic and internal).

Its first minister was Björgvin G. Sigurðsson of the Social Democratic Alliance. He tendered his resignation to the Prime Minister Geir H. Haarde on 25 January 2009 to take partial responsibility for the 2008–2012 Icelandic financial crisis. Björgvin was replaced on 1 February by Gylfi Magnússon, a professor of economics at the University of Iceland without party political affiliation.
