= Ministry of Industry, Energy and Tourism (Iceland) =

Government ministry of Iceland

Coordinates: 64°08′52″N 21°55′52″W

The Icelandic Ministry of Industry, Energy and Tourism (Icelandic: Iðnaðarráðuneytið) is one of the cabinet-level government ministries responsible for Iceland's economy. It shares that responsibility with the Ministry of Business Affairs (responsible for banking and trade) and the Ministry of Fisheries (fishing making up some 40% of Iceland's exports). Since 2009, the responsible minister is Katrín Júlíusdóttir of the Social Democratic Alliance.
