= First cabinet of Steingrímur Hermannsson =

Government of Iceland from 1983 to 1987

- 29th Cabinet of Iceland
- Date formed: 26 May 1983
- Date dissolved: 8 July 1987

People and organisations
- Head of state: Vigdís Finnbogadóttir
- Head of government: Steingrímur Hermannsson
- Member parties: Progressive Party (PP); Independence Party (IP)

History
- Outgoing election: 1987 election
- Predecessor: Gunnar Thoroddsen
- Successor: Þorsteinn Pálsson

The First cabinet of Steingrímur Hermannsson in Iceland was formed 26 May 1983.

== Cabinets ==
=== Inaugural cabinet: 26 May 1983 – 16 October 1985 ===
Incumbent	Minister	Ministry	Party
Steingrímur Hermannsson	Prime Minister (Forsætisráðherra)	Prime Minister's Office (Forsætisráðuneytið)	PP
Albert Sigurður Guðmundsson	Minister of Finance (Fjármálaráðherra)	Ministry of Finance (Fjármálaráðuneytið)	IP
Alexander Stefánsson	Minister of Social Affairs (Félagsmálaráðherra)	Ministry of Social Affairs (Félagsmálaráðuneytið)	PP
Geir Hallgrímsson	Minister for Foreign Affairs (Utanríkisráðherra)	Ministry for Foreign Affairs (Utanríkisráðuneytið)	IP
Halldór Ásgrímsson	Minister of Fisheries (Sjávarútvegsráðherra)	Ministry of Fisheries (Sjávarútvegsráðuneytið)	PP
Jón Helgason	Minister of Agriculture (Landbúnaðarráðherra)	Ministry of Agriculture (Landbúnaðarráðuneytið)	PP
Jón Helgason	Minister of Justice and Ecclesiastical Affairs (Dóms- og kirkjumálaráðherra)	Ministry of Justice and Ecclesiastical Affairs (Dóms- og kirkjumálaráðuneytið)	PP
Matthías Árni Mathiesen	Minister of Commerce (Viðskiptaráðherra)	Ministry of Commerce (Viðskiptaráðuneytið)	IP
Matthías Árni Mathiesen	Minister of Statistics Iceland (Ráðherra Hagstofu Íslands)	Statistics Iceland (Hagstofa Íslands)	IP
Matthías Bjarnason	Minister of Communications (Samgönguráðherra)	Ministry of Communications (Samgönguráðuneytið)	IP
Matthías Bjarnason	Minister of Health and Social Security (Heilbrigðis- og tryggingamálaráðherra)	Ministry of Health and Social Security (Heilbrigðis- og tryggingamálaráðuneytið)	IP
Ragnhildur Helgadóttir	Minister of Education, Science and Culture (Menntamálaráðherra)	Ministry of Education, Science and Culture (Menntamálaráðuneytið)	IP
Sverrir Hermannsson	Minister of Industry (Iðnaðarráðherra)	Ministry of Industry (Iðnaðarráðuneytið)	IP

=== First reshuffle: 16 October 1985 – 24 January 1986 ===
Albert Sigurður Guðmundsson replaced Sverrir Hermannsson as Minister of Industry. Matthías Bjarnason replaced Matthías Árni Mathiesen as Minister of Commerce. Ragnhildur Helgadóttir replaced Matthías Bjarnason as Minister of Health and Social Security. Sverrir Hermannsson replaced Ragnhildur Helgadóttir as Minister of Education, Science and Culture. Þorsteinn Pálsson replaced Albert Sigurður Guðmundsson as Minister of Finance and Matthías Árni Mathiesen as Minister of Statistics Iceland.

Incumbent	Minister	Ministry	Party
Steingrímur Hermannsson	Prime Minister (Forsætisráðherra)	Prime Minister's Office (Forsætisráðuneytið)	PP
Albert Sigurður Guðmundsson	Minister of Industry (Iðnaðarráðherra)	Ministry of Industry (Iðnaðarráðuneytið)	IP
Alexander Stefánsson	Minister of Social Affairs (Félagsmálaráðherra)	Ministry of Social Affairs (Félagsmálaráðuneytið)	PP
Geir Hallgrímsson	Minister for Foreign Affairs (Utanríkisráðherra)	Ministry for Foreign Affairs (Utanríkisráðuneytið)	IP
Halldór Ásgrímsson	Minister of Fisheries (Sjávarútvegsráðherra)	Ministry of Fisheries (Sjávarútvegsráðuneytið)	PP
Jón Helgason	Minister of Agriculture (Landbúnaðarráðherra)	Ministry of Agriculture (Landbúnaðarráðuneytið)	PP
Jón Helgason	Minister of Justice and Ecclesiastical Affairs (Dóms- og kirkjumálaráðherra)	Ministry of Justice and Ecclesiastical Affairs (Dóms- og kirkjumálaráðuneytið)	PP
Matthías Bjarnason	Minister of Commerce (Viðskiptaráðherra)	Ministry of Commerce (Viðskiptaráðuneytið)	IP
Matthías Bjarnason	Minister of Communications (Samgönguráðherra)	Ministry of Communications (Samgönguráðuneytið)	IP
Ragnhildur Helgadóttir	Minister of Health and Social Security (Heilbrigðis- og tryggingamálaráðherra)	Ministry of Health and Social Security (Heilbrigðis- og tryggingamálaráðuneytið)	IP
Sverrir Hermannsson	Minister of Education, Science and Culture (Menntamálaráðherra)	Ministry of Education, Science and Culture (Menntamálaráðuneytið)	IP
Þorsteinn Pálsson	Minister of Finance (Fjármálaráðherra)	Ministry of Finance (Fjármálaráðuneytið)	IP
Þorsteinn Pálsson	Minister of Statistics Iceland (Ráðherra Hagstofu Íslands)	Statistics Iceland (Hagstofa Íslands)	IP

=== Second reshuffle: 24 January 1986 – 24 March 1987 ===
Matthías Árni Mathiesen replaced Geir Hallgrímsson as Minister for Foreign Affairs.

Incumbent	Minister	Ministry	Party
Steingrímur Hermannsson	Prime Minister (Forsætisráðherra)	Prime Minister's Office (Forsætisráðuneytið)	PP
Albert Sigurður Guðmundsson	Minister of Industry (Iðnaðarráðherra)	Ministry of Industry (Iðnaðarráðuneytið)	IP
Alexander Stefánsson	Minister of Social Affairs (Félagsmálaráðherra)	Ministry of Social Affairs (Félagsmálaráðuneytið)	PP
Matthías Árni Mathiesen	Minister for Foreign Affairs (Utanríkisráðherra)	Ministry for Foreign Affairs (Utanríkisráðuneytið)	IP
Matthías Bjarnason	Minister of Commerce (Viðskiptaráðherra)	Ministry of Commerce (Viðskiptaráðuneytið)	IP
Matthías Bjarnason	Minister of Communications (Samgönguráðherra)	Ministry of Communications (Samgönguráðuneytið)	IP
Halldór Ásgrímsson	Minister of Fisheries (Sjávarútvegsráðherra)	Ministry of Fisheries (Sjávarútvegsráðuneytið)	PP
Jón Helgason	Minister of Agriculture (Landbúnaðarráðherra)	Ministry of Agriculture (Landbúnaðarráðuneytið)	PP
Jón Helgason	Minister of Justice and Ecclesiastical Affairs (Dóms- og kirkjumálaráðherra)	Ministry of Justice and Ecclesiastical Affairs (Dóms- og kirkjumálaráðuneytið)	PP
Ragnhildur Helgadóttir	Minister of Health and Social Security (Heilbrigðis- og tryggingamálaráðherra)	Ministry of Health and Social Security (Heilbrigðis- og tryggingamálaráðuneytið)	IP
Sverrir Hermannsson	Minister of Education, Science and Culture (Menntamálaráðherra)	Ministry of Education, Science and Culture (Menntamálaráðuneytið)	IP
Þorsteinn Pálsson	Minister of Finance (Fjármálaráðherra)	Ministry of Finance (Fjármálaráðuneytið)	IP
Þorsteinn Pálsson	Minister of Statistics Iceland (Ráðherra Hagstofu Íslands)	Statistics Iceland (Hagstofa Íslands)	IP

=== Third reshuffle: 24 March 1987 – 8 July 1987 ===
Þorsteinn Pálsson replaced Albert Sigurður Guðmundsson as Minister of Industry.

Incumbent	Minister	Ministry	Party
Steingrímur Hermannsson	Prime Minister (Forsætisráðherra)	Prime Minister's Office (Forsætisráðuneytið)	PP
Alexander Stefánsson	Minister of Social Affairs (Félagsmálaráðherra)	Ministry of Social Affairs (Félagsmálaráðuneytið)	PP
Halldór Ásgrímsson	Minister of Fisheries (Sjávarútvegsráðherra)	Ministry of Fisheries (Sjávarútvegsráðuneytið)	PP
Jón Helgason	Minister of Agriculture (Landbúnaðarráðherra)	Ministry of Agriculture (Landbúnaðarráðuneytið)	PP
Jón Helgason	Minister of Justice and Ecclesiastical Affairs (Dóms- og kirkjumálaráðherra)	Ministry of Justice and Ecclesiastical Affairs (Dóms- og kirkjumálaráðuneytið)	PP
Matthías Árni Mathiesen	Minister for Foreign Affairs (Utanríkisráðherra)	Ministry for Foreign Affairs (Utanríkisráðuneytið)	IP
Matthías Bjarnason	Minister of Commerce (Viðskiptaráðherra)	Ministry of Commerce (Viðskiptaráðuneytið)	IP
Matthías Bjarnason	Minister of Communications (Samgönguráðherra)	Ministry of Communications (Samgönguráðuneytið)	IP
Ragnhildur Helgadóttir	Minister of Health and Social Security (Heilbrigðis- og tryggingamálaráðherra)	Ministry of Health and Social Security (Heilbrigðis- og tryggingamálaráðuneytið)	IP
Sverrir Hermannsson	Minister of Education, Science and Culture (Menntamálaráðherra)	Ministry of Education, Science and Culture (Menntamálaráðuneytið)	IP
Þorsteinn Pálsson	Minister of Finance (Fjármálaráðherra)	Ministry of Finance (Fjármálaráðuneytið)	IP
Þorsteinn Pálsson	Minister of Industry (Iðnaðarráðherra)	Ministry of Industry (Iðnaðarráðuneytið)	IP
Þorsteinn Pálsson	Minister of Statistics Iceland (Ráðherra Hagstofu Íslands)	Statistics Iceland (Hagstofa Íslands)	IP

== See also ==
- Government of Iceland
- Cabinet of Iceland
