= Cabinet of Þorsteinn Pálsson =

Government of Iceland from 1987 to 1988

- 30th Cabinet of Iceland
- Date formed: 8 July 1987
- Date dissolved: 28 September 1988

People and organisations
- Head of state: Vigdís Finnbogadóttir
- Head of government: Þorsteinn Pálsson
- Member parties: Independence Party (IP); Progressive Party (PP); Social Democratic Party (SDP)

History
- Predecessor: Steingrímur Hermannsson I
- Successor: Steingrímur Hermannsson II

The Cabinet of Þorsteinn Pálsson, nicknamed “The government that collapsed on live TV” (Icelandic: Stjórnin sem sprakk í beinni), was the government of Iceland between 8 July 1987 and 28 September 1988. It was led by Prime Minister Þorsteinn Pálsson.

== Cabinet ==
=== Inaugural cabinet: 8 July 1987 – 28 September 1988 ===
Incumbent	Minister	Ministry	Party
Þorsteinn Pálsson	Prime Minister (Forsætisráðherra)	Prime Minister's Office (Forsætisráðuneytið)	IP
Birgir Ísleifur Gunnarsson	Minister of Education, Science and Culture (Menntamálaráðherra)	Ministry of Education, Science and Culture (Menntamálaráðuneytið)	IP
Friðrik Klemenz Sophusson	Minister of Industry (Iðnaðarráðherra)	Ministry of Industry (Iðnaðarráðuneytið)	IP
Guðmundur Kristján Bjarnason	Minister of Health and Social Security (Heilbrigðis- og tryggingamálaráðherra)	Ministry of Health and Social Security (Heilbrigðis- og tryggingamálaráðuneytið)	PP
Halldór Ásgrímsson	Minister of Fisheries (Sjávarútvegsráðherra)	Ministry of Fisheries (Sjávarútvegsráðuneytið)	PP
Jóhanna Sigurðardóttir	Minister of Social Affairs (Félagsmálaráðherra)	Ministry of Social Affairs (Félagsmálaráðuneytið)	SDP
Jón Baldvin Hannibalsson	Minister of Finance (Fjármálaráðherra)	Ministry of Finance (Fjármálaráðuneytið)	SDP
Jón Helgason	Minister of Agriculture (Landbúnaðarráðherra)	Ministry of Agriculture (Landbúnaðarráðuneytið)	PP
Jón Sigurðsson	Minister of Commerce (Viðskiptaráðherra)	Ministry of Commerce (Viðskiptaráðuneytið)	SDP
Jón Sigurðsson	Minister of Justice and Ecclesiastical Affairs (Dóms- og kirkjumálaráðherra)	Ministry of Justice and Ecclesiastical Affairs (Dóms- og kirkjumálaráðuneytið)	SDP
Jón Sigurðsson	Minister of Statistics Iceland (Ráðherra Hagstofu Íslands)	Statistics Iceland (Hagstofa Íslands)	SDP
Matthías Árni Mathiesen	Minister of Communications (Samgönguráðherra)	Ministry of Communications (Samgönguráðuneytið)	IP
Steingrímur Hermannsson	Minister for Foreign Affairs (Utanríkisráðherra)	Ministry for Foreign Affairs (Utanríkisráðuneytið)	PP

== See also ==
- Government of Iceland
- Cabinet of Iceland
