= List of speakers of the Lower House of the Althing =

Speakers of the Lower House of the Althing.

Below is a list of office-holders from 1889:

Name	Period
Jón Sigurðsson	1875–1879
Jón Sigurðsson (Gaultlöndum)	1879–1885
Grímur Thomsen	1885–1886
Jón Sigurðsson (Gaultlöndum)	1886–1889
Benedikt Sveinsson	1889–1891
Þórarinn Böðvarsson	1891–1893
Benedikt Sveinsson	1893–1894
Þórarinn Böðvarson	1894–1895
Benedikt Sveinsson	1895–1897
Þórhallur Bjarnarson	1897–1901
Klemens Jónsson	1901–1905
Magnus Stephensen	1905–1909
Hannes þorsteinsson	1909–1912
Magnús Andrésson	1912–1914
Ólafur Briem	1914–1920
Benedikt Sveinsson	1920–1931
Jörundur Brynjólfsson	1931–1942
Emil Jónsson	1942
Jóhann Þ Jósefsson	1942–1943
Jörundur Brynjólfsson	1943–1945
Barði Guðmundsson	1945–1949
Sigurður Bjarnason	1949–1956
Einar Olgeirsson	1956–1959
Jóhann Hafstein	1959–1961
Ragnhildur Helgadóttir	1961–1962
Jóhann Hafstein	1962 – 14 November 1963
Sigurður Bjarnason	14 November 1963 – 28 February 1970
Matthías Árni Mathiesen	2 March 1970 – 1971
Gils Guðmundsson	1971–1974
Ragnhildur Helgadóttir	1974–1978
Ingvar Gíslason	1978–1979
Árni Gunnarsson	1979
Sverrir Hermannsson	1979–1983
Ingvar Gíslason	1983–1987
Jón Kristjánsson	1987–1988
Kjartan Jóhannsson	1988–1989
Árni Gunnarsson	1989–1991
Matthías Bjarnason	1991

In 1991 the Alting became unicameral.

== Sources ==
- The official website of the Althing
