= Matthías Bjarnason =

Icelandic politician (1921–2014)

Minister of Commerce
- In office 16 October 1985 – 8 July 1987
- Prime Minister: Steingrímur Hermannsson
- Preceded by: Matthías Árni Mathiesen
- Succeeded by: Jón Sigurðsson

Minister of Communications
- In office 26 May 1983 – 8 July 1987
- Prime Minister: Steingrímur Hermannsson
- Preceded by: Steingrímur Hermannsson
- Succeeded by: Matthías Árni Mathiesen

Minister of Health and Social Security
- In office 26 May 1983 – 16 October 1985
- Prime Minister: Steingrímur Hermannsson
- Preceded by: Svavar Gestsson
- Succeeded by: Ragnhildur Helgadóttir
- In office 28 August 1974 – 1 September 1978
- Prime Minister: Geir Hallgrímsson
- Preceded by: Magnús Kjartansson
- Succeeded by: Magnús Helgi Magnússon

Minister of Fisheries
- In office 28 August 1974 – 1 September 1978
- Prime Minister: Geir Hallgrímsson
- Preceded by: Lúdvik Jósepsson
- Succeeded by: Kjartan Jóhannsson

Personal details
- Born: 15 August 1921 Ísafjörður, Iceland
- Died: 28 February 2014 (aged 92) Kópavogur, Iceland
- Party: Independence Party

Matthías Bjarnason (15 August 1921 – 28 February 2014) was an Icelandic politician and former minister.
