= Ministry for Foreign Affairs (Iceland) =

Government ministry of Iceland

Coordinates: 64°08′31″N 21°54′50″W

Ministry of Foreign Affairs of Iceland
- Utanríkisráðuneytið

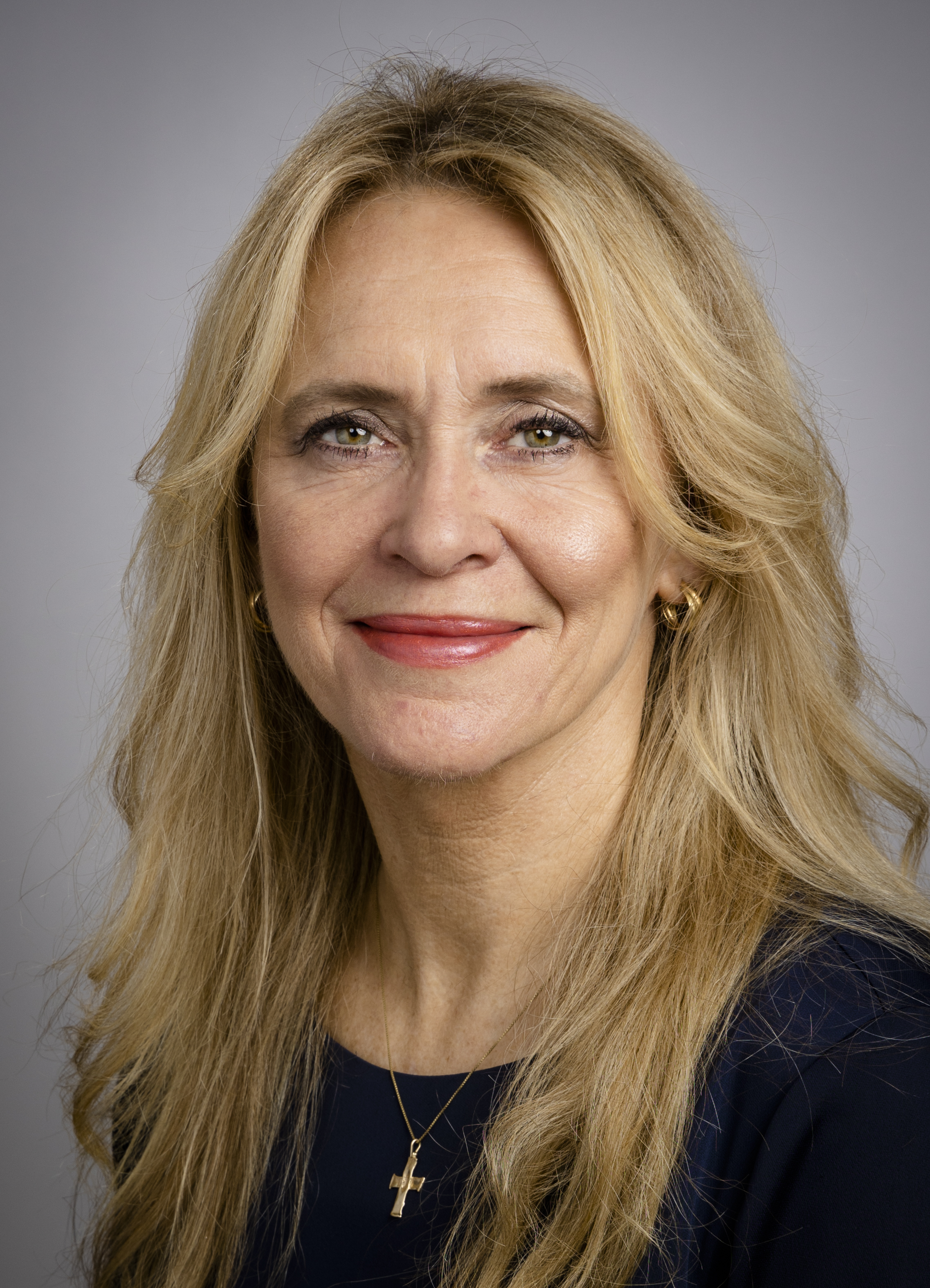
- Incumbent; Þorgerður Katrín Gunnarsdóttir since 21 December 2024
- Ministry of Foreign Affairs
- Member of: Cabinet of Iceland
- Term length: No fixed length
- Formation: 18 November 1941
- First holder: Stefán Jóhann Stefánsson
- Website: https://www.government.is/ministries/ministry-for-foreign-affairs/

The Ministry for Foreign Affairs (Icelandic: Utanríkisráðuneytið) is an Icelandic cabinet-level ministry founded 18 November 1941. The ministry is responsible for foreign policy, diplomatic missions, trade, foreign aid, and interactions with international organizations among other tasks.

The current Minister for Foreign Affairs is Þorgerður Katrín Gunnarsdóttir

The Ministry of Foreign Affairs is also responsible for national security and defense policy for Iceland.

== List of Ministers ==
The following lists the Ministers of Foreign Affairs, their party, date of assuming and leaving office, their tenure in years and days, and the cabinet they served in.

Key

Independence Party
Progressive Party
Social Democratic Party
Social Democratic Alliance

Portrait	Name	Party	Took office	Left office	Tenure	Cabinet	Ref
	Stefán Jóhann Stefánsson	SDP	18 November 1941	17 January 1942	60 days	Hermann Jónasson IV	
	Ólafur Thors	IP	16 May 1942	16 December 1942	214 days	Ólafur Thors I	
	Vilhjálmur Þór	Independent	16 December 1942	21 October 1944	1 year, 310 days	Björn Þórðarson	
	Ólafur Thors	IP	21 October 1944	4 February 1947	2 years, 106 days	Ólafur Thors II	
	Bjarni Benediktsson	IP	4 February 1947	11 September 1953	6 years, 219 days	Stefán Jóhann Stefánsson; Ólafur Thors III; Steingrímur Steinþórsson	
	Kristinn Guðmundsson	PP	11 September 1953	24 July 1956	2 years, 317 days	Ólafur Thors IV	
	Guðmundur Í. Guðmundsson	SDP	24 July 1956	3 August 1956	10 days	Hermann Jónasson V	
	Emil Jónsson	SDP	3 August 1956	17 October 1956	75 days	Hermann Jónasson V	
	Guðmundur Í. Guðmundsson	SDP	17 October 1956	31 August 1965	8 years, 318 days	Hermann Jónasson V Emil Jónsson; Ólafur Thors V Bjarni Benediktsson (1908)	
	Emil Jónsson	SDP	31 August 1965	14 July 1971	5 years, 317 days	Bjarni Benediktsson (1908); Jóhann Hafstein	
	Einar Ágústsson	PP	14 July 1971	1 September 1978	7 years, 49 days	Ólafur Jóhannesson I Geir Hallgrímsson	
	Benedikt Gröndal	SDP	1 September 1978	8 February 1980	1 year, 160 days	Ólafur Jóhannesson II; Benedikt Gröndal	
	Ólafur Jóhannesson	PP	8 February 1980	26 May 1983	3 years, 107 days	Gunnar Thoroddsen	
	Geir Hallgrímsson	IP	26 May 1983	24 January 1986	2 years, 243 days	Steingrímur Hermannsson I	
	Matthías Á. Mathiesen	IP	24 January 1986	8 July 1987	1 year, 165 days	Steingrímur Hermannsson I	
	Steingrímur Hermannsson	PP	8 July 1987	28 September 1988	1 year, 82 days	Þorsteinn Pálsson	
	Jón Baldvin Hannibalsson	SDP	28 September 1988	23 April 1995	6 years, 207 days	Steingrímur Hermannsson	
	Halldór Ásgrímsson	PP	23 April 1995	15 September 2004	9 years, 145 days	Davíð Oddsson	
	Davíð Oddsson	IP |	15 September 2004	27 September 2005	1 year, 12 days	Halldór Ásgrímsson	

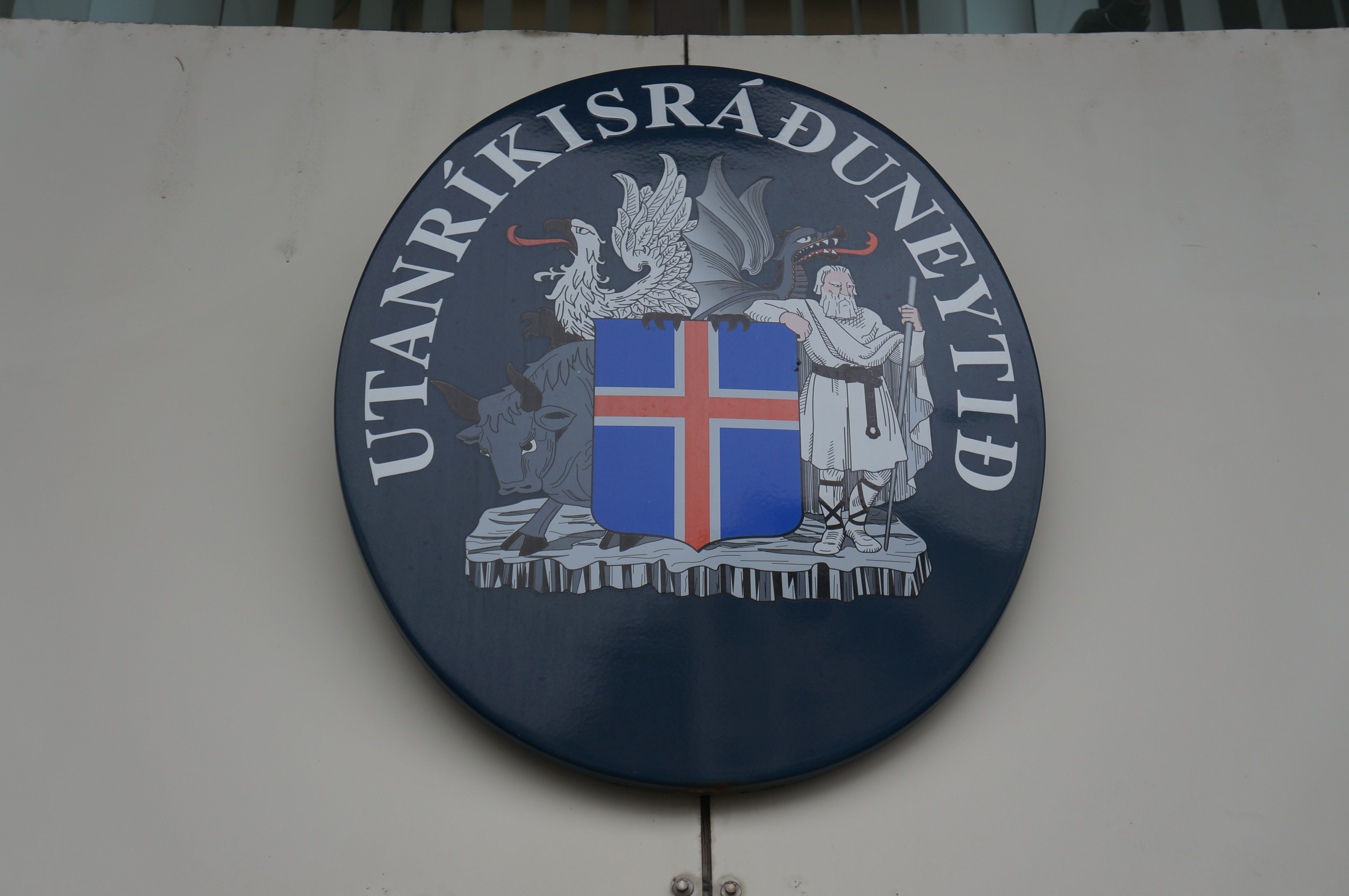
Symbol

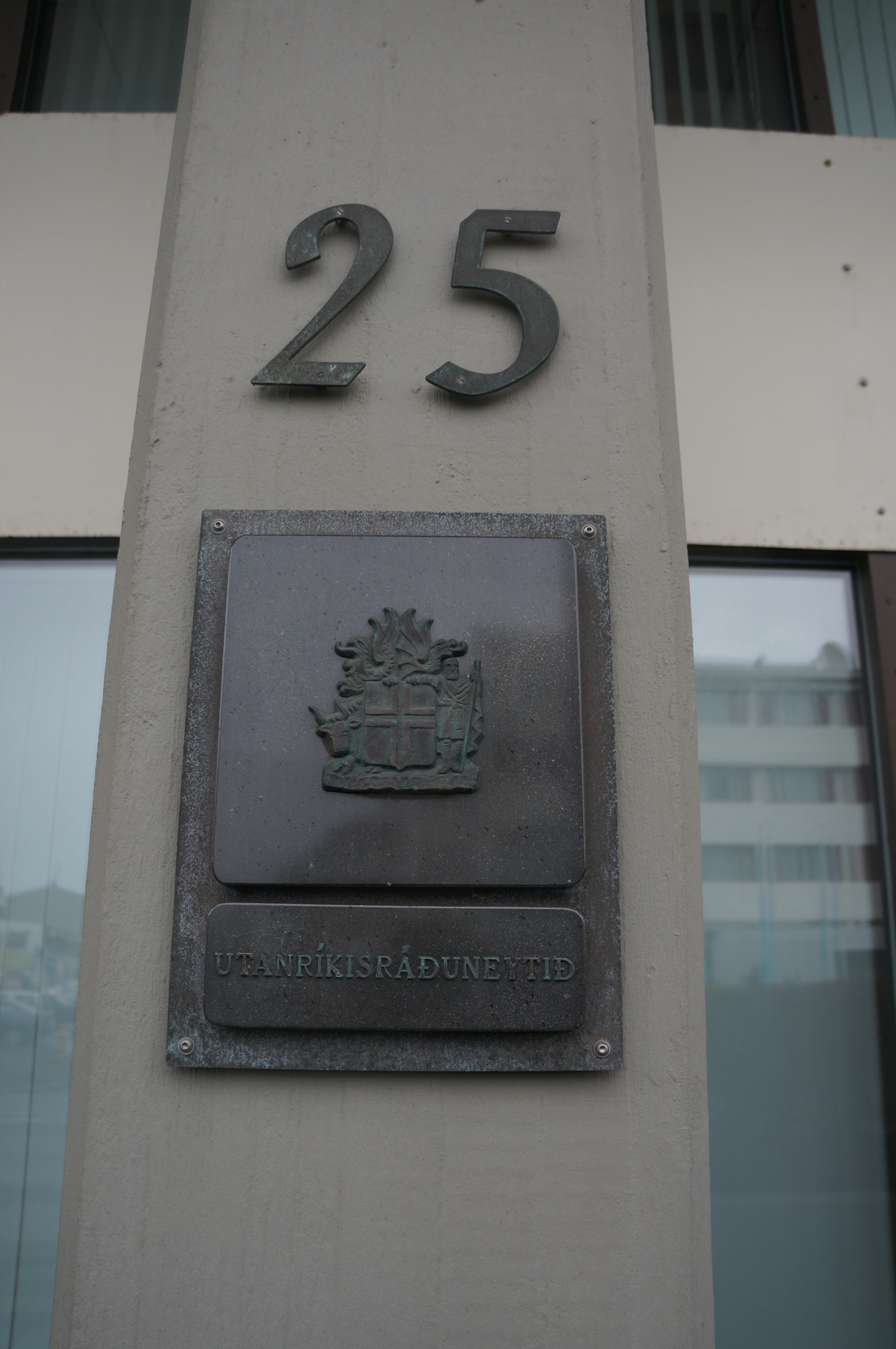
Street Address

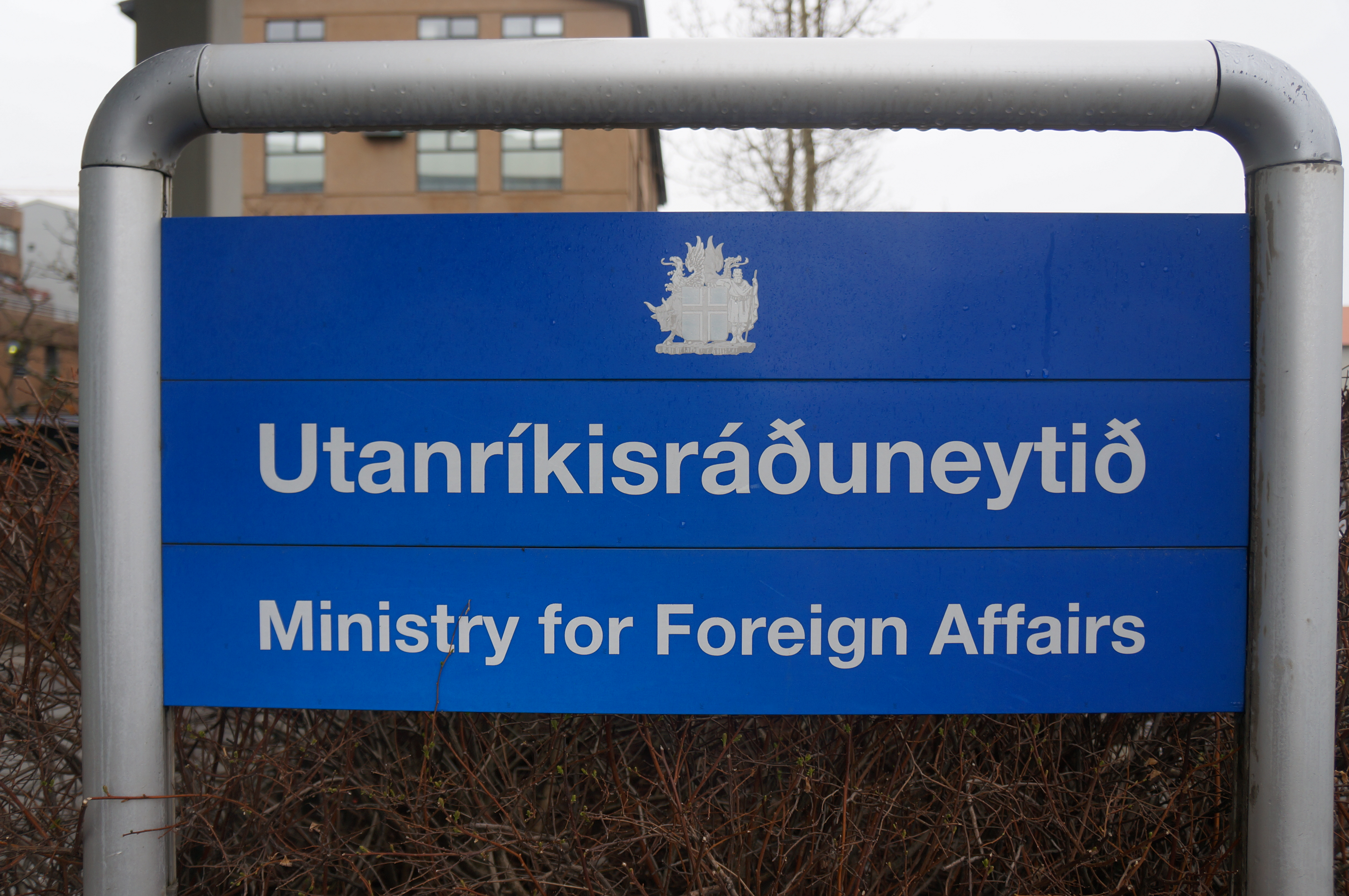
Sign in Iceland

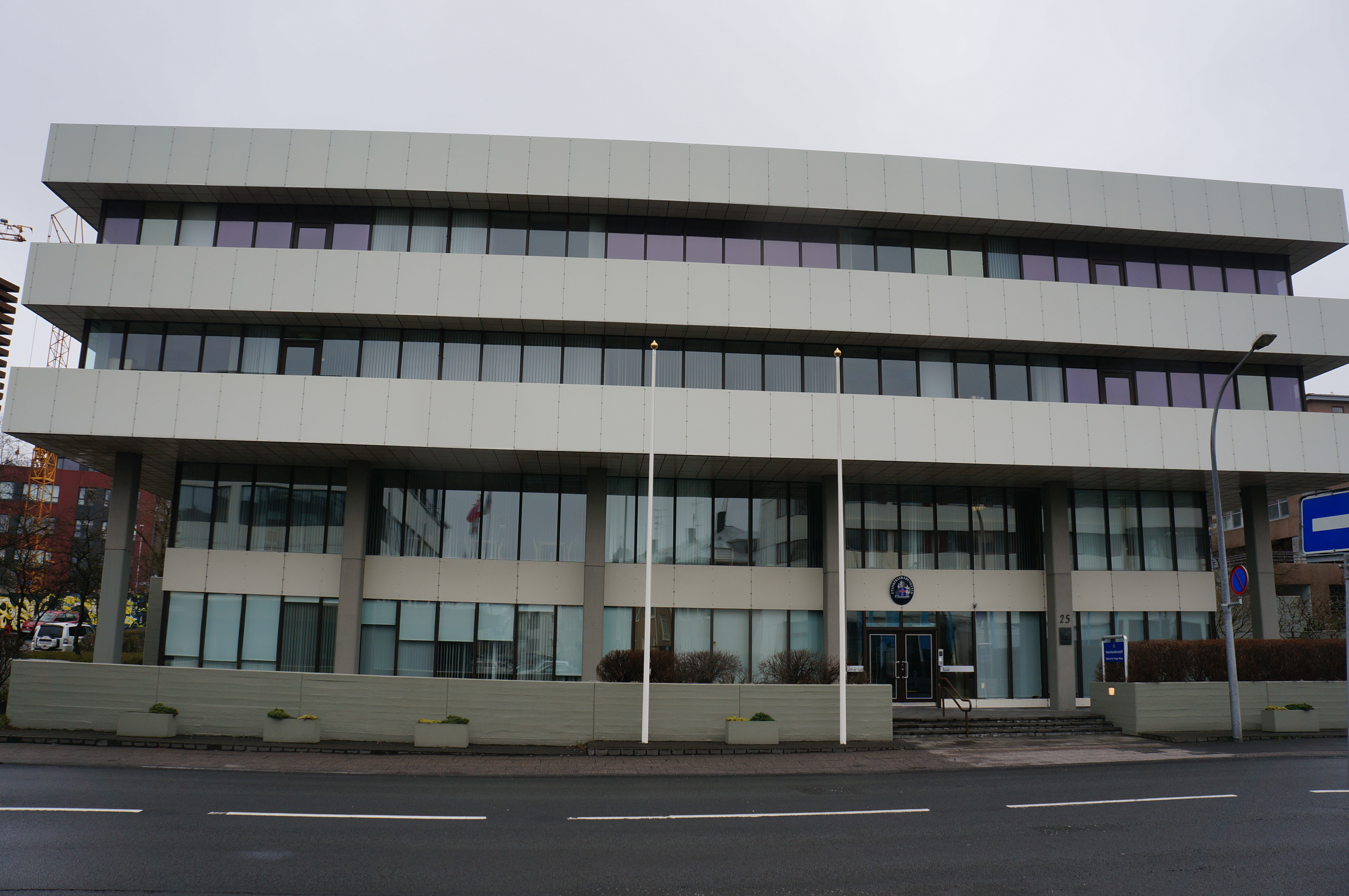
Main Office

== See also ==
- Foreign Affairs Committee
- Foreign relations of Iceland
