= Minister of Justice (Iceland) =

The Minister of Justice (Icelandic: Dómsmálaráðherra) in Iceland is the head of the Ministry of Justice and is a member of the Cabinet of Iceland. The Ministry was formed in 2017, and the current Minister is Þorbjörg Sigríður Gunnlaugsdóttir.

== History ==
The Minister of Justice and Ecclesiastical Affairs was the head of the Ministry of Justice and Ecclesiastical Affairs, which existed between 1 January 1970 and 1 October 2009. Before the Cabinet of Iceland Act no. 73/1969 took effect, ministries in Iceland had not existed separately from the ministers. Between 4 January 1917 and 1 January 1970, the minister responsible for justice was titled Minister of Justice and the minister responsible for ecclesiastical affairs was titled Minister of Ecclesiastical Affairs. In cases where one person was responsible for both, he or she was titled Minister of Justice and Ecclesiastical Affairs. On 1 October 2009, the position became Minister of Justice and Human Rights (Icelandic: Dómsmála- og mannréttindaráðherra) and the ministry itself was renamed accordingly. On 31 December 2010, the Ministry of Justice and Human Rights was merged with the Ministry of Transport, Communications and Local Government to form the Ministry of the Interior. On 1 May 2017 the Ministry of the Interior was again split up into the Ministry of Justice and the Ministry of Transport and Local Government.

== List of ministers ==
=== Minister of Justice (4 January 1917 – 1 January 1970) ===
Nº	Minister	Took office	Left office	Duration	Party	Cabinet
1	Jón Magnússon (1859–1926)	4 January 1917	7 March 1922	5 years, 2 months, 3 days (1,888 days)		
2	Sigurður Eggerz (1875–1945)	7 March 1922	22 March 1924	2 years, 15 days (746 days)		
(1)	Jón Magnússon (1859–1926)	22 March 1924	23 June 1926	2 years, 3 months, 1 day (823 days)		
3	Magnús Guðmundsson (1879–1937)	23 June 1926	28 August 1927	1 year, 2 months, 5 days (431 days)		
4	Jónas Jónsson (1885–1968)	28 August 1927	20 April 1931	3 years, 7 months, 23 days (1,331 days)		
5	Tryggvi Þórhallsson (1889–1935)	20 April 1931	20 August 1931	4 months (122 days)		
(4)	Jónas Jónsson (1885–1968)	20 August 1931	3 June 1932	9 months, 14 days (288 days)		
(3)	Magnús Guðmundsson (1879–1937)	3 June 1932	14 November 1932	5 months, 11 days (164 days)		
6	Ólafur Thors (1892–1964)	14 November 1932	23 December 1932	1 month, 9 days (39 days)	IP	
(3)	Magnús Guðmundsson (1879–1937)	23 December 1932	28 July 1934	1 year, 7 months, 5 days (582 days)		
7	Hermann Jónasson (1896–1976)	28 July 1934	16 May 1942	7 years, 9 months, 18 days (2,849 days)	PP	
8	Jakob Möller (1880–1955)	16 May 1942	16 December 1942	7 months (214 days)		
9	Einar Arnórsson (1880–1955)	16 December 1942	21 September 1944	1 year, 9 months, 5 days (645 days)		
10	Björn Þórðarson (1879–1963)	21 September 1944	21 October 1944	1 month (30 days)	independent	
11	Finnur Jónsson (1894–1951)	21 October 1944	4 February 1947	2 years, 3 months, 14 days (836 days)	SDP	
12	Bjarni Benediktsson (1908–1970)	4 February 1947	24 July 1956	9 years, 5 months, 20 days (3,458 days)	IP	
(7)	Hermann Jónasson (1896–1976)	24 July 1956	23 December 1958	2 years, 4 months, 29 days (882 days)	PP	
13	Friðjón Skarphéðinsson (1909–1996)	23 December 1958	20 November 1959	10 months, 28 days (332 days)	SDP	
(12)	Bjarni Benediktsson (1908–1970)	20 November 1959	14 November 1963	3 years, 11 months, 25 days (1,455 days)	IP	
14	Jóhann Hafstein (1915–1980)	14 November 1963	1 January 1970	6 years, 1 month, 18 days (2,240 days)	IP	

=== Minister of Ecclesiastical Affairs (4 January 1917 – 1 January 1970) ===
Nº	Minister	Took office	Left office	Duration	Party	Cabinet
1	Jón Magnússon (1859–1926)	4 January 1917	7 March 1922	5 years, 2 months, 3 days (1,888 days)		
2	Sigurður Eggerz (1875–1945)	7 March 1922	22 March 1924	2 years, 15 days (746 days)		
(1)	Jón Magnússon (1859–1926)	22 March 1924	23 June 1926	2 years, 3 months, 1 day (823 days)		
3	Magnús Guðmundsson (1879–1937)	23 June 1926	28 August 1927	1 year, 2 months, 5 days (431 days)		
4	Jónas Jónsson (1885–1968)	28 August 1927	20 April 1931	3 years, 7 months, 23 days (1,331 days)		
5	Tryggvi Þórhallsson (1889–1935)	20 April 1931	20 August 1931	4 months (122 days)		
(4)	Jónas Jónsson (1885–1968)	20 August 1931	3 June 1932	9 months, 14 days (288 days)		
(3)	Magnús Guðmundsson (1879–1937)	3 June 1932	23 June 1932	20 days (20 days)		
6	Þorsteinn Briem (1885–1949)	23 June 1932	28 July 1934	2 years, 1 month, 5 days (765 days)		
7	Hermann Jónasson (1896–1976)	28 July 1934	16 May 1942	7 years, 9 months, 18 days (2,849 days)	PP	
8	Magnús Jónsson (1887–1958)	16 May 1942	16 December 1942	7 months (214 days)		
9	Björn Þórðarson (1879–1963)	16 December 1942	21 October 1944	1 year, 10 months, 5 days (675 days)	independent	
10	Emil Jónsson (1902–1986)	21 October 1944	4 February 1947	2 years, 3 months, 14 days (836 days)	SDP	
11	Eysteinn Jónsson (1906–1993)	4 February 1947	6 December 1949	2 years, 10 months, 2 days (1,036 days)	PP	
12	Bjarni Benediktsson (1908–1970)	6 December 1949	14 March 1950	3 months, 8 days (98 days)	IP	
(7)	Hermann Jónasson (1896–1976)	14 March 1950	11 September 1953	3 years, 5 months, 28 days (1,277 days)	PP	
13	Steingrímur Steinþórsson (1893–1966)	11 September 1953	24 July 1956	2 years, 10 months, 13 days (1,047 days)	PP	
(7)	Hermann Jónasson (1896–1976)	24 July 1956	23 December 1958	2 years, 4 months, 29 days (882 days)	PP	
14	Friðjón Skarphéðinsson (1909–1996)	23 December 1958	20 November 1959	10 months, 28 days (332 days)	SDP	
(12)	Bjarni Benediktsson (1908–1970)	20 November 1959	14 September 1961	1 year, 9 months, 25 days (664 days)	IP	
15	Jóhann Hafstein (1915–1980)	14 September 1961	31 December 1961	3 months, 17 days (108 days)	IP	
(12)	Bjarni Benediktsson (1908–1970)	31 December 1961	14 November 1963	1 year, 10 months, 14 days (683 days)	IP	
(15)	Jóhann Hafstein (1915–1980)	14 November 1963	1 January 1970	6 years, 1 month, 18 days (2,240 days)	IP	

=== Minister of Justice and Ecclesiastical Affairs (1 January 1970 – 1 October 2009) ===
Nº	Minister	Took office	Left office	Duration	Party	Cabinet
1	Jóhann Hafstein (1915–1980)	1 January 1970	10 October 1970	9 months, 9 days (282 days)	IP	Bjarni Benediktsson
1	Jóhann Hafstein (1915–1980)	1 January 1970	10 October 1970	9 months, 9 days (282 days)	IP	Jóhann Hafstein
2	Auður Auðuns (1911–1999)	10 October 1970	14 July 1971	9 months, 4 days (277 days)	IP	Jóhann Hafstein
3	Ólafur Jóhannesson (1913–1984)	14 July 1971	1 September 1978	7 years, 1 month, 18 days (2,606 days)	PP	Ólafur Jóhannesson I
3	Ólafur Jóhannesson (1913–1984)	14 July 1971	1 September 1978	7 years, 1 month, 18 days (2,606 days)	PP	Geir Hallgrímsson
4	Steingrímur Hermannsson (1928–2010)	1 September 1978	15 October 1979	1 year, 1 month, 14 days (409 days)	PP	Ólafur Jóhannesson II
5	Vilmundur Gylfason (1948–1983)	15 October 1979	8 February 1980	3 months, 24 days (116 days)	SDP	Benedikt Sigurðsson Gröndal
6	Friðjón Þórðarson (1923–2009)	8 February 1980	26 May 1983	3 years, 3 months, 18 days (1,203 days)	IP	Gunnar Thoroddsen
7	Jón Helgason (1931–2019)	26 May 1983	8 July 1987	4 years, 1 month, 12 days (1,504 days)	PP	Steingrímur Hermannsson I
8	Jón Sigurðsson (1941–)	8 July 1987	28 September 1988	1 year, 2 months, 20 days (448 days)	SDP	Þorsteinn Pálsson
9	Halldór Ásgrímsson (1947–2015)	28 September 1988	10 September 1989	11 months, 13 days (347 days)	PP	Steingrímur Hermannsson II
10	Óli Þorbjörn Guðbjartsson (1935–)	10 September 1989	30 April 1991	1 year, 7 months, 20 days (597 days)	CP	Steingrímur Hermannsson III
11	Þorsteinn Pálsson (1947–)	30 April 1991	11 May 1999	8 years, 11 days (2,933 days)	IP	Davíð Oddsson I
11	Þorsteinn Pálsson (1947–)	30 April 1991	11 May 1999	8 years, 11 days (2,933 days)	IP	Davíð Oddsson II
12	Davíð Oddsson (1948–2026)	11 May 1999	28 May 1999	17 days (17 days)	IP	Davíð Oddsson II
13	Sólveig Guðrún Pétursdóttir (1952–)	28 May 1999	23 May 2003	3 years, 11 months, 25 days (1,456 days)	IP	Davíð Oddsson III
14	Björn Bjarnason (1944–)	23 May 2003	1 February 2009	5 years, 8 months, 9 days (2,081 days)	IP	Davíð Oddsson IV
14	Björn Bjarnason (1944–)	23 May 2003	1 February 2009	5 years, 8 months, 9 days (2,081 days)	IP	Halldór Ásgrímsson
14	Björn Bjarnason (1944–)	23 May 2003	1 February 2009	5 years, 8 months, 9 days (2,081 days)	IP	Geir Haarde I
14	Björn Bjarnason (1944–)	23 May 2003	1 February 2009	5 years, 8 months, 9 days (2,081 days)	IP	Geir Haarde II
15	Ragna Árnadóttir (1966–)	1 February 2009	—	—	independent	Jóhanna Sigurðardóttir I
15	Ragna Árnadóttir (1966–)	1 February 2009	—	—	independent	Jóhanna Sigurðardóttir II

=== Minister of Justice and Human Rights (1 October 2009 – 31 December 2010) ===
Nº	Minister	Took office	Left office	Duration	Party	Cabinet
(15)	Ragna Árnadóttir (1966–)	—	2 September 2010	1 year, 7 months, 1 day (578 days)	independent	Jóhanna Sigurðardóttir II
16	Ögmundur Jónasson (1948–)	2 September 2010	31 December 2010	3 months, 29 days (120 days)	LGM	Jóhanna Sigurðardóttir II

=== Minister of the Interior (2011–2017) ===
See Minister of the Interior (Iceland)

=== Minister of Justice (2017–) ===
Nº	Minister	Took office	Left office	Duration	Party	Cabinet
1	Sigríður Á. Andersen (1971–)	11 January 2017	14 March 2019	2 years, 62 days	IP	Bjarni Benediktsson
1	Sigríður Á. Andersen (1971–)	11 January 2017	14 March 2019	2 years, 62 days	IP	Katrín Jakobsdóttir
—	Þórdís Kolbrún R. Gylfadóttir (1987–)	14 March 2019	5 September 2019	175 days	IP	Katrín Jakobsdóttir
2	Áslaug Arna Sigurbjörnsdóttir (1990–)	6 September 2019	28 November 2021	2 years, 83 days	IP	Katrín Jakobsdóttir
3	Jón Gunnarsson (1956–)	1 February 2022	19 June 2023	1 year, 138 days	IP	Katrín Jakobsdóttir II
4	Guðrún Hafsteinsdóttir (1970–)	19 June 2023	21 December 2024	1 year, 185 days	IP	Katrín Jakobsdóttir II
4	Guðrún Hafsteinsdóttir (1970–)	19 June 2023	21 December 2024	1 year, 185 days	IP	Bjarni Benediktsson II
5	Þorbjörg Sigríður Gunnlaugsdóttir (1978–)	21 December 2024	Incumbent	1 year, 245 days	RP	Kristrún Frostadóttir
