= Þórður =

Þórður [ˈθourðʏr̥] is an Icelandic given name. Notable people with the name include:

- Þórður Friðjónsson (Thordur Fridjonsson), (1952–2011), Vice President of Iceland Stock Exchange and President of NASDAQ OMX Iceland
- Þórður Guðjónsson, (Thordur Gudjonsson), (born 1973), footballer
- Þórður Guðmundsson (1908–1988), Icelandic water polo player
- Þórður Helgason (born 1947), writer and educator
- Þórður Jónassen (1800–1880), Icelandic politician
- Þórður Jónsson (footballer, born 1934) (1934–2018), Icelandic footballer
- Þórður Snær Júlíusson (born 1980), Icelandic journalist
- Þórður Lárusson (born 1954), Icelandic former football namager
- Þórður Pálsson, Icelandic film director
- Þórður kakali Sighvatsson (died 1256), 13th century chieftain during the Age of the Sturlungs
- Þórður Sveinbjörnsson (1786–1856), Icelandic politician
- Þórður Þórðarson (1930–2002), footballer
- Þórður Þórðarson (born 1972), footballer
- Þórður Þorláksson (1637–1697), Icelandic bishop
