= Minister of Infrastructure (Iceland) =

The minister of infrastructure in Iceland is the head of the Ministry of Infrastructure (formerly known as the Ministry of Transport and Local Government) and forms a part of the Cabinet of Iceland. The ministry was formed in 2017 and the current minister is Eyjólfur Ármannsson.

== History ==
The Minister of Communications (Icelandic: Samgönguráðherra) was a cabinet position which existed between 20 November 1959 and 1 October 2009. The Minister of Communications existed alongside the minister after 1 January 1970 when the Cabinet of Iceland Act no. 73/1969 took effect since ministries had not formally existed separately from the ministers. On 1 October 2009 the position became Minister of Transport, Communications and Local Government (Icelandic: Samgöngu- og sveitarstjórnarráðherra) and the ministry itself was also renamed accordingly.

On 31 December 2010 the Ministry of Transport, Communications and Local Government was merged with the Ministry of Justice and Human Rights to form the Ministry of the Interior. On 1 May 2017 the Ministry of the Interior was again split up into the Ministry of Justice and the Ministry of Transport and Local Government. On 28 November 2021, the position changed its name to Minister of Infrastructure due to the renaming of the Ministry.

== List of ministers ==
=== Minister of Communications (20 November 1959 – 1 October 2009) ===
Nº	Minister	Took office	Left office	Duration	Party	Cabinet
1	Ingólfur Jónsson (1909–1984)	20 November 1959	14 July 1971	11 years, 7 months, 24 days (4,254 days)	IP	Bjarni Benediktsson
1	Ingólfur Jónsson (1909–1984)	20 November 1959	14 July 1971	11 years, 7 months, 24 days (4,254 days)	IP	Jóhann Hafstein
2	Hannibal Valdimarsson (1903–1991)	14 July 1971	16 July 1973	2 years, 2 days (733 days)	ULL	Ólafur Jóhannesson I
3	Björn Jónsson (1916–1985)	16 July 1973	6 May 1974	9 months, 20 days (294 days)	ULL	Ólafur Jóhannesson I
4	Magnús Torfi Ólafsson (1915–2003)	6 May 1974	28 August 1974	3 months, 22 days (114 days)	ULL	Ólafur Jóhannesson I
5	Halldór Eggert Sigurðsson (1915–2003)	28 August 1974	1 September 1978	4 years, 4 days (1,465 days)	PP	Geir Hallgrímsson
6	Ragnar Arnalds (1938–2022)	1 September 1978	15 October 1979	1 year, 1 month, 14 days (409 days)	PA	Ólafur Jóhannesson II
7	Magnús Helgi Magnússon (1922–2006)	15 October 1979	8 February 1980	3 months, 24 days (116 days)	SDP	Benedikt Sigurðsson Gröndal
8	Steingrímur Hermannsson (1928–2010)	8 February 1980	26 May 1983	3 years, 3 months, 18 days (1,203 days)	PP	Gunnar Thoroddsen
9	Matthías Bjarnason (1921–2014)	26 May 1983	8 July 1987	4 years, 1 month, 12 days (1,504 days)	IP	Steingrímur Hermannsson I
10	Matthías Árni Mathiesen (1931–2011)	8 July 1987	28 September 1988	year, 2 months, 20 days (448 days)	IP	Þorsteinn Pálsson
11	Steingrímur J. Sigfússon (1955–)	28 September 1988	30 April 1991	2 years, 7 months, 2 days (944 days)	PA	Steingrímur Hermannsson II
11	Steingrímur J. Sigfússon (1955–)	28 September 1988	30 April 1991	2 years, 7 months, 2 days (944 days)	PA	Steingrímur Hermannsson III
12	Halldór Blöndal (1938–2025)	30 April 1991	28 May 1999	8 years, 28 days (2,950 days)	IP	Davíð Oddsson I
12	Halldór Blöndal (1938–2025)	30 April 1991	28 May 1999	8 years, 28 days (2,950 days)	IP	Davíð Oddsson II
13	Sturla Böðvarsson (1945–2026)	28 May 1999	24 May 2007	7 years, 11 months, 26 days (2,918 days)	IP	Davíð Oddsson III
13	Sturla Böðvarsson (1945–2026)	28 May 1999	24 May 2007	7 years, 11 months, 26 days (2,918 days)	IP	Davíð Oddsson IV
13	Sturla Böðvarsson (1945–2026)	28 May 1999	24 May 2007	7 years, 11 months, 26 days (2,918 days)	IP	Halldór Ásgrímsson
13	Sturla Böðvarsson (1945–2026)	28 May 1999	24 May 2007	7 years, 11 months, 26 days (2,918 days)	IP	Geir Haarde I
14	Kristján L. Möller (1953–)	24 May 2007	—	—	SDA	Geir Haarde II
14	Kristján L. Möller (1953–)	24 May 2007	—	—	SDA	Jóhanna Sigurðardóttir I
14	Kristján L. Möller (1953–)	24 May 2007	—	—	SDA	Jóhanna Sigurðardóttir II

=== Minister of Transport, Communications and Local Government (1 October 2009 – 31 December 2010) ===
Nº	Minister	Took office	Left office	Duration	Party	Cabinet
(14)	Kristján L. Möller (1953–)	—	2 September 2010	3 years, 3 months, 9 days (1,197 days)	SDA	Jóhanna Sigurðardóttir II
15	Ögmundur Jónasson (1948–)	2 September 2010	31 December 2010	3 months, 29 days (120 days)	LGM	Jóhanna Sigurðardóttir II

=== Minister of the Interior (2011–2017) ===
See Minister of the Interior (Iceland)

=== Minister of Transport and Local Government (2017–2021) ===
Nº	Minister	Took office	Left office	Duration	Party	Cabinet
(14)	Jón Gunnarsson (1956–)	11 January 2017	30 November 2017	323 days	IP	Bjarni Benediktsson
15	Sigurður Ingi Jóhannsson (1962–)	30 November 2017	28 November 2021	3 years, 363 days	PP	Katrín Jakobsdóttir

=== Minister of Infrastructure (2021–2024) ===
Nº	Minister	Took office	Left office	Duration	Party	Cabinet
(15)	Sigurður Ingi Jóhannsson (1962–)	28 November 2021	9 April 2024	2 years, 133 days	PP	Katrín Jakobsdóttir II
16	Svandís Svavarsdóttir (1964–)	9 April 2024	17 October 2024	191 days	LGM	Bjarni Benediktsson II
(15)	Sigurður Ingi Jóhannsson (1962–)	17 October 2024	21 December 2024	65 days	PP	Bjarni Benediktsson II

=== Minister of Transport and Local Government (2024–) ===
Nº	Minister	Took office	Left office	Duration	Party	Cabinet
17	Eyjólfur Ármannsson (1969–)	21 December 2024	Incumbent	1 year, 252 days	PP	Kristrún Frostadóttir
