= Björgvin G. Sigurðsson =

Icelandic politician

Björgvin Guðni Sigurðsson
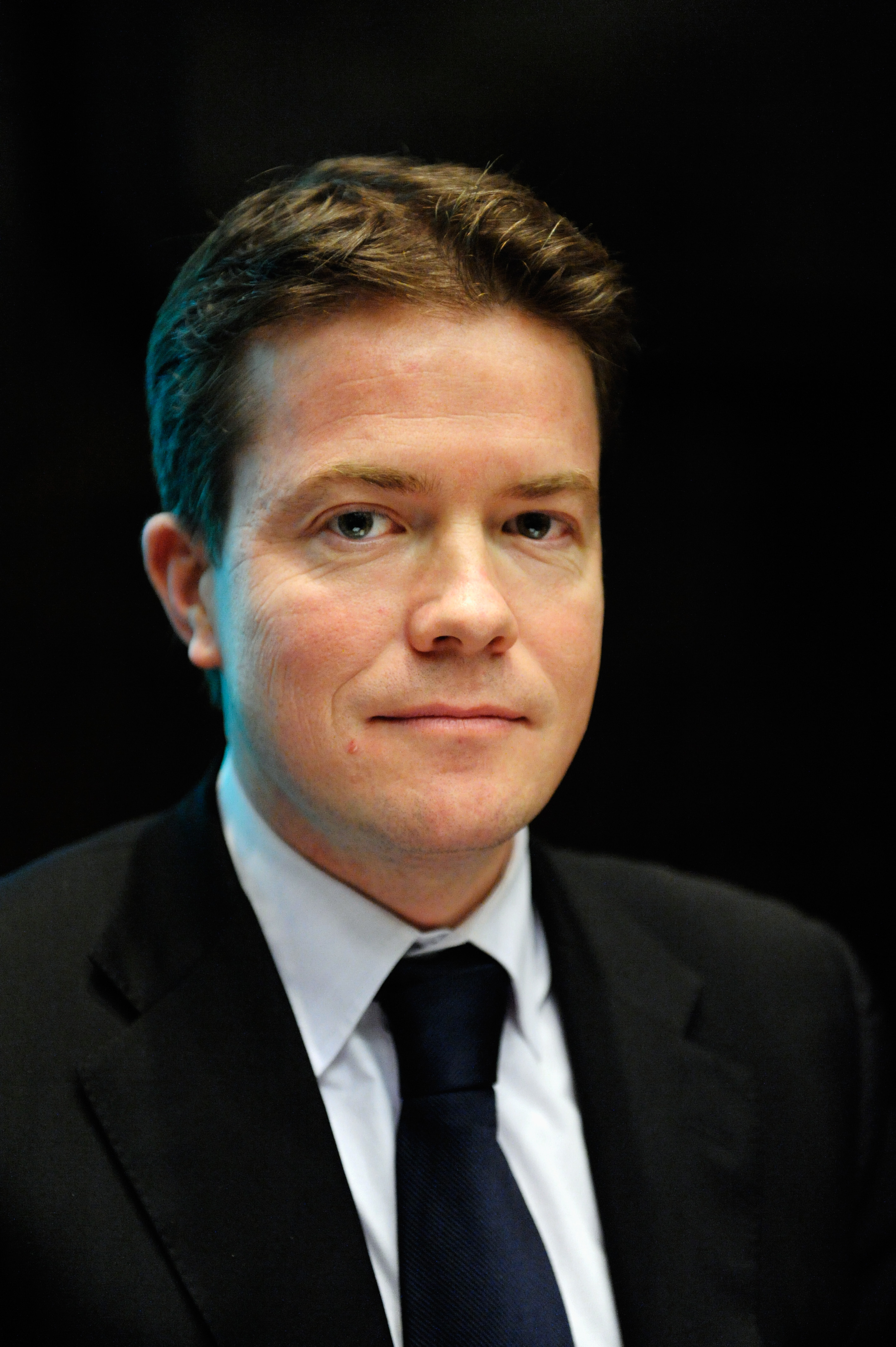

Minister of Business Affairs
- In office 24 May 2007 – 25 January 2009
- Prime Minister: Geir Haarde
- Preceded by: Jón Sigurðsson (as Minister of Industry and Commerce)
- Succeeded by: Gylfi Magnússon

Personal details
- Born: 30 October 1970 (age 55) Reykjavík, Iceland
- Party: Social Democratic Alliance
- Spouse: María Ragna Lúðvígsdóttir
- Children: six children
- Education: University of Iceland; University College Cork
- Profession: Journalist

Björgvin G. Sigurðsson (born 30 October 1970) is an Icelandic politician, representing the Social Democratic Alliance. He became Iceland's first Minister of Business Affairs when the new ministry was split off from the Ministry of Industry and Commerce on 24 May 2007. On 25 January 2009 Björgvin announced he would be stepping down as Minister effective immediately, firing the head of the Icelandic Financial Supervisory Authority as his last official act. He thus assumed part of the political responsibility for the current financial crisis and the associated protests. He was a been a member of the Althing (Iceland's parliament) for the South Iceland constituency from 2003 to 2013.

Political offices
Preceded by Jón Sigurðsson as Minister of Industry and Commerce	Minister of Business Affairs; 2007–2009	Succeeded by Gylfi Magnússon
Preceded by Össur Skarphéðinsson	Minister for Nordic Cooperation; 2008–2009	Succeeded by Kolbrún Halldórsdóttir
