= Kjartan Gunnarsson =

Icelandic lawyer (born 1951)

Kjartan Gunnarsson (born October 4, 1951) is an Icelandic lawyer, best known for serving for 26 years as the executive director of the Icelandic conservative Independence Party from 1980 until 2006. He has also worked for Landsbanki bank. He is a longtime supporter and friend of former Icelandic Prime Minister Davíð Oddsson.
