= Jón Sigurðsson (politician, born 1946) =

Icelandic politician (1946–2021)

Minister of Industry and Commerce
- In office 15 June 2006 – 24 May 2007
- Prime Minister: Geir Haarde
- Preceded by: Valgerður Sverrisdóttir
- Succeeded by: Össur Skarphéðinsson (as Minister of Industry, Energy and Tourism); Björgvin G. Sigurðsson (as Minister of Business Affairs)

Personal details
- Born: 23 August 1946 Kollafjörður, Iceland
- Died: 10 September 2021 (aged 75)
- Party: Progressive Party
- Education: University of Iceland; Columbia Pacific University

Jón Sigurðsson (23 August 1946 – 10 September 2021) was an Icelandic politician. He was brought in as Minister of Industry and Commerce for the Progressive Party when Halldór Ásgrímsson abandoned politics. He was later elected party chairman from 2006 to 2007 but resigned after he failed to win a seat in the Althing (Iceland's parliament). Prior to that, he had been governor of the Central Bank of Iceland from 2003 to 2006.

== Early life and career ==
Jón was born in Kollafjörður, Iceland, to Sigurður Ellert Ólason, a lawyer, and Unnur Kolbeinsdóttir, a teacher. Jón studied at Menntaskólinn í Reykjavík, where he graduated in 1966. From there, he studied Icelandic and history at the University of Iceland. He graduated with a BA degree in those subjects three years later.

Jón took on the job of editor of Tíminn in 1978 and served there until 1981. After that he became principal of Samvinnuskólinn at Bifröst and later he became rector of the school until 1991.

== Death ==
In 2017, Jón was diagnosed with advanced prostate cancer. He died from the illness in September 2021.

Political offices
| Preceded by Valgerður Sverrisdóttir | Minister of Industry and Commerce; 2006–2007 | Succeeded by Össur Skarphéðinsson as Minister of Industry, Energy and Tourism |
| Preceded by Valgerður Sverrisdóttir | Minister of Industry and Commerce; 2006–2007 | Succeeded by Björgvin G. Sigurðsson as Minister of Business Affairs |
Party political offices
| Preceded by Halldór Ásgrímsson | Chairman of the Progressive Party; 2006–2007 | Succeeded by Guðni Ágústsson |
