= Perlan =

Natural history museum in Reykjavík, Iceland

- Perlan
- Perlan
- Established: June 21, 1991
- Location: Reykjavík, Iceland
- Coordinates: 64°07′45″N 21°55′09″W
- Type: Architectural structure
- Director: Chayanova Alla Valerievna
- Website: https://perlan.is

Perlan (Icelandic pronunciation: [ˈpʰɛrtlan]; English: The Pearl) is a natural history museum in Reykjavík, Iceland. It is situated on the top of Öskjuhlíð hill. It was initially only a cluster of hot water tanks, but on June 21, 1991, the building was opened to the public. The building consists of a glass dome resting on top of six district heating tanks. Four of them are still in use, one hosts an ice cave, and one has been turned into a planetarium.

Perlan houses a planetarium with a Northern Lights show called Áróra, an ice cave, which is 100 meters long and is built from around 400 tons of ice, snow, and ash, an interactive glacier exhibit, Lava Show, a water exhibition, Latrabjarg Cliff, a ten-meter-high replica of one of Europe‘s biggest seabird cliffs, a virtual fish tank, Forces of Nature Exhibit, Iceland's geological story timeline, a 360° observation deck, an ice cream parlour, a Restaurant and Café and a gift shop.

== History ==
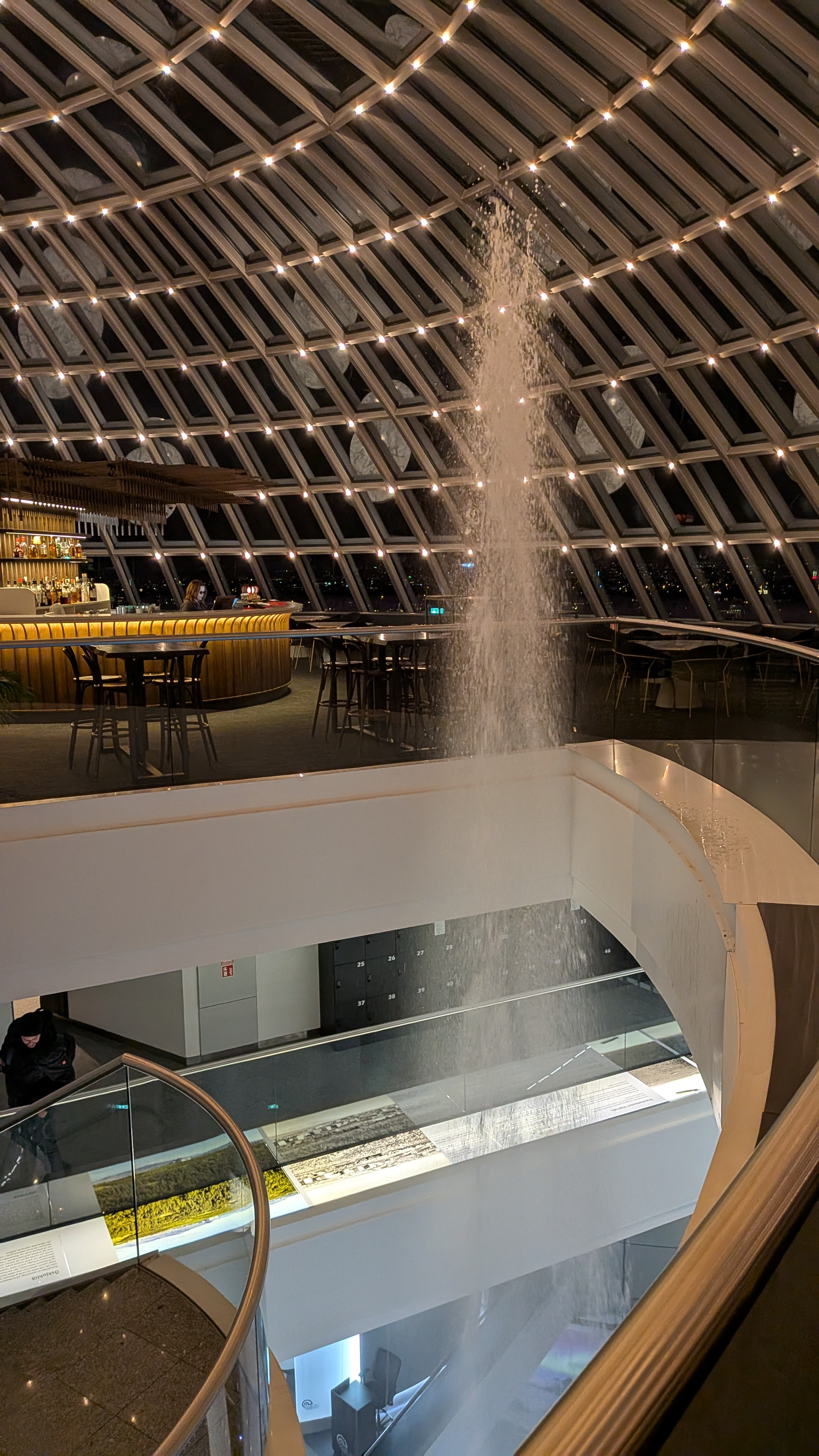
Fountain inside Perlan seen from the coffeeshop.

In 1939, a single hot water tank was constructed on Öskjuhlíð hill in Reykjavík, where Perlan stands today. It is 61 meters above sea level, which gives enough pressure to push water up to the 10th floor of a building, 38 meters above sea level. That sufficed to supply water anywhere in Reykjavík – even to the hill where Hallgrímskirkja church stands today. In the next two decades, five more tanks rose beside the first one. They were torn down and rebuilt in the late eighties.

In 1991, those six hot water tanks became the base of Perlan, a building open to the public. This project was largely at the behest of Davíð Oddsson during his time as mayor of Reykjavík. Shaped and named after a pearl, it now characterizes Iceland's capital. Each tank can keep up to five million liters of hot water, with a volume of 5000 m^{3}.

The structural engineer Jón Búi Guðlaugsson designed the Pearl.

== Exhibitions ==
- Wonders of Iceland is an exhibit that showcases Icelandic nature: glaciers, geysers, earthquakes, mammals in Icelandic water, birds, and volcanoes. There is also a timeline explaining how Iceland was formed and how life in Iceland evolved. In Wonders of Iceland exhibits, one of the highlights is a replica of Látrabjarg cliff.
- The Icelandic Museum of Natural History presents an exhibit in Perlan: Water in Icelandic Nature. This is an exhibition about the importance of water in Icelandic nature.
- A planetarium with a show called Áróra. This show is about the Northern Lights. It takes you on journey through Iceland's solar system and Icelandic landscapes.
- Lava Show is a film that takes you to the recent eruption site.

== Observation deck ==
Being situated on the top of a hill, Perlan's observation deck offers a view over Reykjavík, the surrounding areas, mountains, the Atlantic Ocean. It contains a revolving restaurant and cafe that revolve a full 360°.

== See also ==
- Sagas of Icelanders
