= Sverrir Hermannsson =

Icelandic politician, businessman, and banker (1930–2018)

Minister of Industry
- In office 26 May 1983 – 16 October 1985
- Prime Minister: Steingrímur Hermannsson
- Preceded by: Hjörleifur Guttormsson
- Succeeded by: Albert Guðmundsson

14th Minister of Education
- In office 16 October 1985 – 8 July 1987
- Prime Minister: Steingrímur Hermannsson
- Preceded by: Ragnhildur Helgadóttir
- Succeeded by: Birgir Ísleifur Gunnarsson

Personal details
- Born: 26 February 1930 Ögurvík, Iceland
- Died: 12 March 2018 (aged 88) Reykjavík, Iceland
- Party: Independence Party; Liberal Party
- Spouse: Greta Lind Kristjánsdóttir
- Children: 6
- Education: University of Iceland

Sverrir Hermannsson (26 February 1930 – 12 March 2018) was an Icelandic politician, businessman, and banker.

== Early life ==
Sverrir was born in the Svalbarði farm in Ögurvík, Ísafjarðardjúp, on 26 February 1930, to Hermann Hermannsson and Salóme Rannveig Gunnarsdóttir. He graduated from a high school in Akureyri in 1951 and earned a business degree from the University of Iceland in 1955.

== Career ==
Beginning in politics as a member of the Independence Party, he was Speaker of the lower chamber of Althing from 1979 to 1983.

Sverrir was Minister of Industry from 1983 to 1985, followed by Minister of Education from 1985 until 1987. From 1975 to 1983, and again from 1987 to 1988, he sat on the Nordic Council. In 1988, he resigned from the Althing to manage Landsbanki where he served until 1998.

Soon after leaving Landsbanki, in 1998, he returned to politics to found the Liberal Party and served its chairman from 1998 to 2003. At the 1999 election, he was returned to the Althing, representing Reykjavík, before leaving politics again in 2003.

== Death ==
Sverrir died, at the age of 88, on 12 March 2018.
