= Þorsteinn Pálsson =

Prime Minister of Iceland (1987–1988)

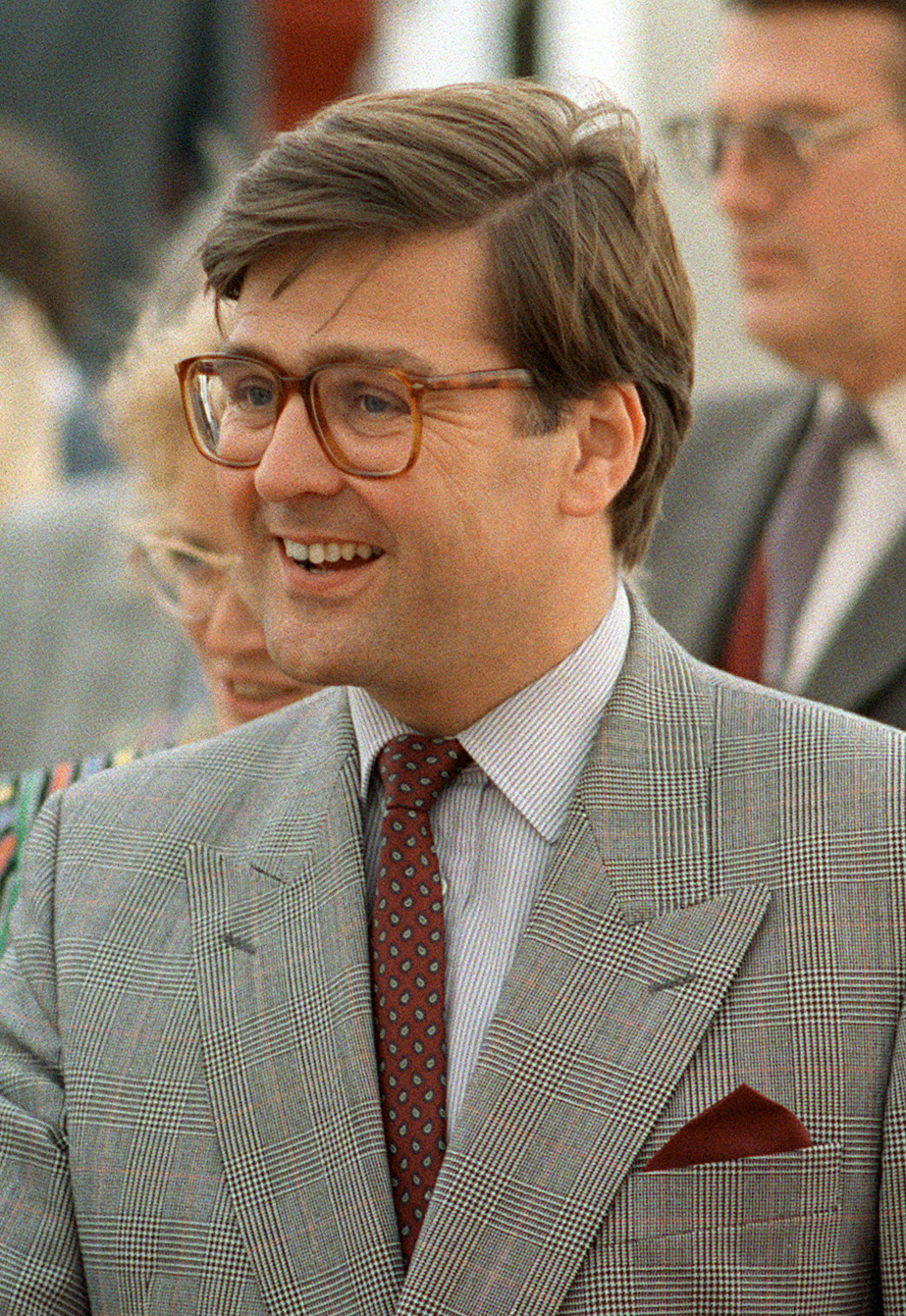

24th Prime Minister of Iceland
- In office 8 July 1987 – 28 September 1988
- President: Vigdís Finnbogadóttir
- Preceded by: Steingrímur Hermannsson
- Succeeded by: Steingrímur Hermannsson

Minister of Fisheries
- In office 30 April 1991 – 11 May 1999
- Prime Minister: Davíð Oddsson
- Preceded by: Halldór Ásgrímsson
- Succeeded by: Árni Mathiesen

Minister of Justice
- In office 30 April 1991 – 11 May 1999
- Prime Minister: Davíð Oddsson
- Preceded by: Óli Guðbjartsson
- Succeeded by: Sólveig Pétursdóttir

Minister of Finance
- In office 16 October 1985 – 8 July 1987
- Prime Minister: Steingrímur Hermannsson
- Preceded by: Albert Guðmundsson
- Succeeded by: Jón Baldvin Hannibalsson

Personal details
- Born: 29 October 1947 (age 78) Selfoss, Iceland
- Party: Independence Party (Before 2016); Liberal Reform Party (2016-present)
- Education: University of Iceland

Þorsteinn Pálsson (pronounced [ˈθɔr̥steitn ˈpʰaulsɔn]; born 29 October 1947) is an Icelandic politician who served as prime minister of Iceland for the Independence Party from 8 July 1987 to 28 September 1988. Þorsteinn led the Independence Party from 1983 to 1991, when he lost an inner partial election to then vice-chairman of the party and mayor of Reykjavík, Davíð Oddsson. His coalition was dissolved in September 1988 by Progressive Party leader, Steingrímur Hermannsson and Social Democratic Party leader, Jón Baldvin Hannibalsson because of different views on price stagnation.

Prior to his period as Prime Minister, Þorsteinn was Minister of Finance from 1985 to 1987. He represented Southern Iceland in the Althing (Iceland's Parliament) from 1983 to 1999. When Davíð Oddsson formed his first government in 1991 he appointed Þorsteinn as minister of Fisheries and Justice and Ecclesiastical Affairs. He remained in this position until 1999. Later he became ambassador, first in London and later in Copenhagen. He was editor of the newspaper Fréttablaðið between 2006 and 2009.

In 2016, Þorsteinn left the Independence Party and joined the newly formed Reform party, a more moderate right wing party.

Party political offices
Preceded by Geir Hallgrímsson	Leader of the Independence Party; 1983–1991	Succeeded by Davíð Oddsson
Political offices
Preceded by Albert Guðmundsson	Minister of Finance; 1985–1987	Succeeded by Jón Baldvin Hannibalsson
Preceded by Steingrímur Hermannsson	Prime Minister of Iceland; 1987–1988	Succeeded by Steingrímur Hermannsson
Preceded by Halldór Ásgrímsson	Minister of Fisheries; 1991–1999	Succeeded by Árni Mathiesen
Preceded by Óli Guðbjartsson	Minister of Justice and Ecclesiastical Affairs; 1991–1999	Succeeded by Sólveig Pétursdóttir
