= Alexander Stefánsson =

Icelandic politician

Alexander Stefánsson (6 October 1922 – 28 May 2008) was an Icelandic politician and former minister for social affairs from May 1983 to July 1987.
