= Albert Guðmundsson (footballer, born 1923) =

Icelandic footballer (1923–1994)

Minister of Finance
- In office 26 May 1983 – 16 October 1985
- President: Vigdís Finnbogadóttir
- Prime Minister: Steingrímur Hermannsson
- Preceded by: Tómas Árnason
- Succeeded by: Þórður Friðjónsson

Minister of Industry
- In office 16 October 1985 – 24 March 1987
- Prime Minister: Steingrímur Hermannsson
- Preceded by: Hrafn Bragason
- Succeeded by: Jón Sigurðsson

Member of the Althing
- In office 1974–1989
- Constituency: Reykjavík

Ambassador of Iceland to France
- In office 1989–1993

President of the City Council of Reykjavík
- In office 1982–1983

President of the Football Association of Iceland
- In office 1968–1973

Personal details
- Born: 5 October 1923 Reykjavík, Iceland
- Died: 7 April 1994 (aged 70) Reykjavík, Iceland
- Party: Independence Party; Citizens' Party
- Spouse: Brynhildur Hjördís Jóhannsdóttir
- Children: 3
- Education: Co-operative College; Skerry's College
- Profession: Politician; Businessman; Footballer; Diplomat
Association football career
- Position: Forward
Senior career*
Years	Team	Apps	(Gls)
1938–1944	Valur		
1944	Rangers		
1944–1946	Arsenal	2	(0)
1947–1948	Nancy		
1948–1949	AC Milan	14	(2)
1949–1952	RC Paris	69	(31)
1952	Nice	14	(0)
1953–1955	Valur		
1956–1958	ÍBH Hafnarfjörður		
Total		109	(33)
International career
1946–1958	Iceland	6	(2)
- * Club domestic league appearances and goals

Albert Sigurður Guðmundsson (5 October 1923 – 7 April 1994) was an Icelandic professional footballer who played for, amongst others, Rangers, Arsenal, Nancy and A.C. Milan. After retiring from his sporting career, he became a politician and was a member of Alþingi for 15 years, serving as Minister of Finance of Iceland and Minister of Industry.

== Sporting career ==
Albert played football from a young age with local club Valur. In 1944, he made his way to Scotland to study business at Skerry's College, Glasgow. He began his foreign footballing career with Rangers. After a short stint there, he went to England where he played for Arsenal as an amateur; he played several friendly matches and two First Division matches in October 1946. He was only Arsenal's second foreign player.

== Political career ==
In 1974, he was elected to the Alþingi (the Icelandic parliament), representing Reykjavík. He ran for president in 1980 election but only finished third and lost to Vigdís Finnbogadóttir. In 1983, he became Minister of Finance of Iceland. In 1985, he was appointed Minister of Industry, a position he held until 1987, when a tax scandal forced his resignation.

Feeling that the Independence Party's leadership had failed to support him, he left the party soon after his resignation and only a few weeks before a general election. He then immediately founded the Citizens' Party and sat in parliament for them for two years before being appointed ambassador to France.

== Personal life ==
Albert's son is former international striker and former politician Ingi Björn Albertsson, who held the record for most goals in the Icelandic top division from 1987 until 2012. Ingi's daughter and Albert's granddaughter is former international footballer Kristbjörg Ingadóttir. Kristbjörg's son, and Albert's great-grandson, is footballer Albert Guðmundsson. All four generations have scored for the Icelandic national team.
