= Davíð Oddsson =

Icelandic politician (1948–2026)

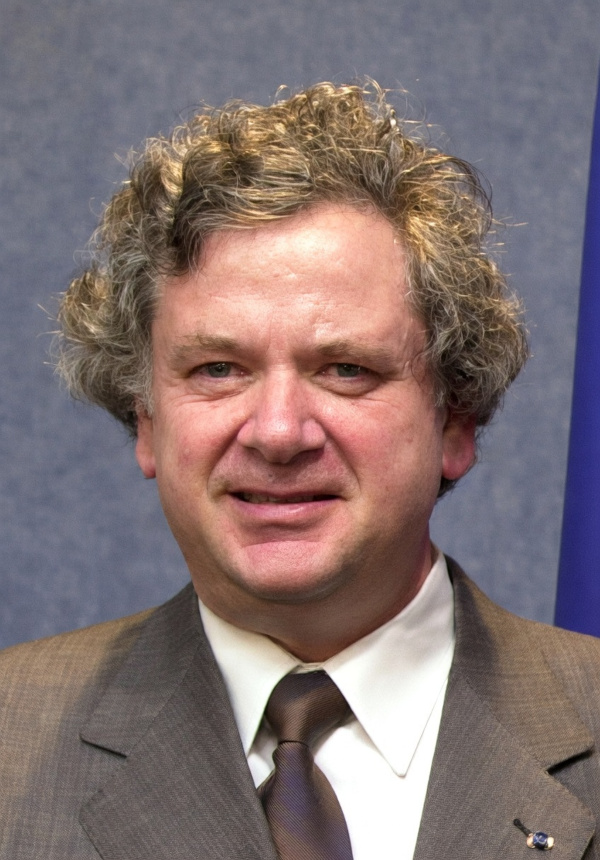
- Davíð in 2001

Prime Minister of Iceland
- In office 30 April 1991 – 15 September 2004
- President: Vigdís Finnbogadóttir; Ólafur Ragnar Grímsson
- Preceded by: Steingrímur Hermannsson
- Succeeded by: Halldór Ásgrímsson

Minister for Foreign Affairs
- In office 15 September 2004 – 27 September 2005
- Prime Minister: Halldór Ásgrímsson
- Preceded by: Halldór Ásgrímsson
- Succeeded by: Geir Haarde

10th Mayor of Reykjavik
- In office 27 May 1982 – 16 July 1991
- Preceded by: Egill Skúli Ingibergsson
- Succeeded by: Markús Örn Antonsson

Personal details
- Born: 17 January 1948 Reykjavík, Iceland
- Died: 1 March 2026 (aged 78) Skerjafjörður, Iceland
- Party: Independence Party
- Education: University of Iceland

Davíð Oddsson (pronounced [ˈtaːvið ˈɔtsɔn]; 17 January 1948 – 1 March 2026) was an Icelandic politician, and the longest-serving prime minister of Iceland, in office from 1991 to 2004. From 2004 to 2005, he served as foreign minister and as the chairman for the Independence Party from 1991 to 2005. Previously, he was Mayor of Reykjavík from 1982 to 1991, and chaired the board of governors of the Central Bank of Iceland from 2005 to 2009. The 2008–2011 Icelandic financial crisis led to vocal demands for his resignation, both from members of the Icelandic public and from the new Icelandic Prime Minister Jóhanna Sigurðardóttir, which resulted in his being replaced as head of the Central Bank in March 2009.

In September 2009, he was hired as the editor of Morgunblaðið, one of Iceland's largest newspapers, a decision that caused nationwide controversy and was followed by resignations and widespread terminated subscriptions. He contested the election for President of Iceland on 25 June 2016 but lost to Guðni Jóhannesson, coming in fourth place with 13.7% of the popular vote.

Davíð was one of the most popular and successful politicians in Icelandic history but was also highly controversial for his support for the Iraq War and for his part in the 2008 financial crisis. Time named Davíð as one of the 25 people the most to blame for the crisis worldwide.

== Life and career ==
=== Early years ===
Davíð Oddsson was born in Reykjavík on 17 January 1948. His father was a doctor, and his mother a secretary. His parents were not married, and he was brought up in his maternal grandfather's home in Selfoss until his grandfather died. He then moved with his mother and grandmother to Reykjavík.

He took an early interest in acting, and attended an acting school for a while. He also attended the gymnasium Menntaskólinn í Reykjavík where he graduated in the spring of 1970. Davíð married Ástríður Thorarensen, a nurse; they have one son, Þorsteinn, who is a judge at the district court at Akureyri. The next six years, Davíð read law at the University of Iceland, working almost full-time as well. He was assistant to the director of a small theatre (now the Borgarleikhúsið) for a while, and with two friends (Þórarinn Eldjárn and Hrafn Gunnlaugsson), he produced a popular radio comedy show for two years; he was for a while a political commentator at the newspaper Morgunblaðið, and the director of publication of Almenna bókafélagið, a conservative publishing house. He had been elected to the Municipal Council in Reykjavík in 1974, for the Independence Party.

=== Mayor of Reykjavík (1982–1991) ===
Davíð Oddsson was a member of a group of young conservative-libertarians within the Independence Party who felt that the party should more strongly support attempts to extend economic freedom in the heavily regulated Icelandic economy. The group included Þorsteinn Pálsson, Geir H. Haarde, Jón Steinar Gunnlaugsson, Kjartan Gunnarsson, Magnús Gunnarsson, Brynjólfur Bjarnason and Hannes Hólmsteinn Gissurarson, and they published the magazine Eimreiðin from 1972 to 1975; they also followed with interest what was happening in the United Kingdom under Margaret Thatcher and in the United States under Ronald Reagan; they also read books and articles by and about Milton Friedman, Friedrich Hayek and James M. Buchanan, who all visited Iceland in the early 1980s and whose messages of limited governments, privatisation, and liberalisation of the economy had a wide impact.

Davíð got a chance to further his ideals when, in 1982, the Independence Party, under his leadership, regained the majority in the Reykjavík Municipal Council which it had lost four years earlier to three left-wing parties. Davíð swiftly reduced the number of Council members from 21 to 15, and merged the largest fishing firm in Reykjavík, which belonged to the municipality and had been a huge burden, with a private fishing firm and then sold off the municipality's assets in the new firm, Grandi, which became one of the biggest fishing firms in Iceland. Incidentally, the director of Grandi, Brynjólfur Bjarnason, later became the director of the Icelandic Telephone Company which turned out to be Davíð's last privatisation in government (2005). As Mayor of Reykjavík, Davíð was behind the building of Reykjavík City Hall by Tjörnin in Reykjavík, and of Perlan, a natural history museum with a revolving restaurant, built atop the district hot water tanks in Öskjuhlíð. Despite his libertarian leanings, Davíð also supported the Reykjavík City Theatre, in particular the building of a new theatre house which was opened in 1989. In the nine years when Davíð was Mayor of Reykjavík, a new district, Grafarvogur, was built and a new shopping area around the Kringlan shopping mall. A forceful and uncompromising Mayor of Reykjavík, Davíð was much criticized by the left-wing opposition in the Municipal Council.

=== Alliance with the Social Democrats (1991–1995) ===
In 1983, Davíð Oddsson's old friend and ally, Þorsteinn Pálsson, was elected leader of the Independence Party, and in 1989 Davíð was elected deputy leader or Vice-Chairman of the party. After Þorsteinn resigned as prime minister in 1988, after falling out with the leaders of his two coalition parties, there was a widespread feeling in the party that its leadership should be changed, and pressure was put on Davíð to run against Þorsteinn, which he did in 1991, becoming leader of the party. Under Davíð's leadership, in 1991, the party regained most of the parliamentary support it had lost in 1987. In record time, Davíð formed a coalition government with the social democrats, Alþýðuflokkurinn, whose leader, Jón Baldvin Hannibalsson, became Minister of Foreign Affairs. Jón Baldvin and Davíð jointly decided that Iceland should become the first state to renew recognition of the sovereignty and independence of the three Baltic countries, Estonia, Latvia and Lithuania, prior to the collapse of the Soviet Union.

Davíð's government inherited a huge budget deficit and a number of unproductive investments: much money had been spent on fish farming for example, with little result. Inflationary pressures were also building, while some fish stocks in Icelandic waters were being depleted. The budget deficit was turned into a surplus in 1996, not least because of the close cooperation between Davíð and Friðrik Sophusson, the Minister of Finance, who had also been a prominent young libertarian. There has been a surplus almost continuously since then, which was used to reduce the public debt, and also to reform the pension system, which is now almost wholly self-supporting. Some small companies were privatised. Monetary constraints were imposed by making the Central Bank largely independent of any political pressures. It also helped the Davíð Oddsson government that there was a consensus between the labour unions and the employers that the rampant inflation of the 1980s, with huge, but largely meaningless, wage increases, could not go on; therefore, in 1990, the unions and the employers had signed a "National Accord", whereby wage increases would be moderate, and government would be assisted in bringing down inflation. From 1991, inflation in Iceland was on a level with neighbouring countries.

=== Alliance with the Progressive Party (1995–1999) ===
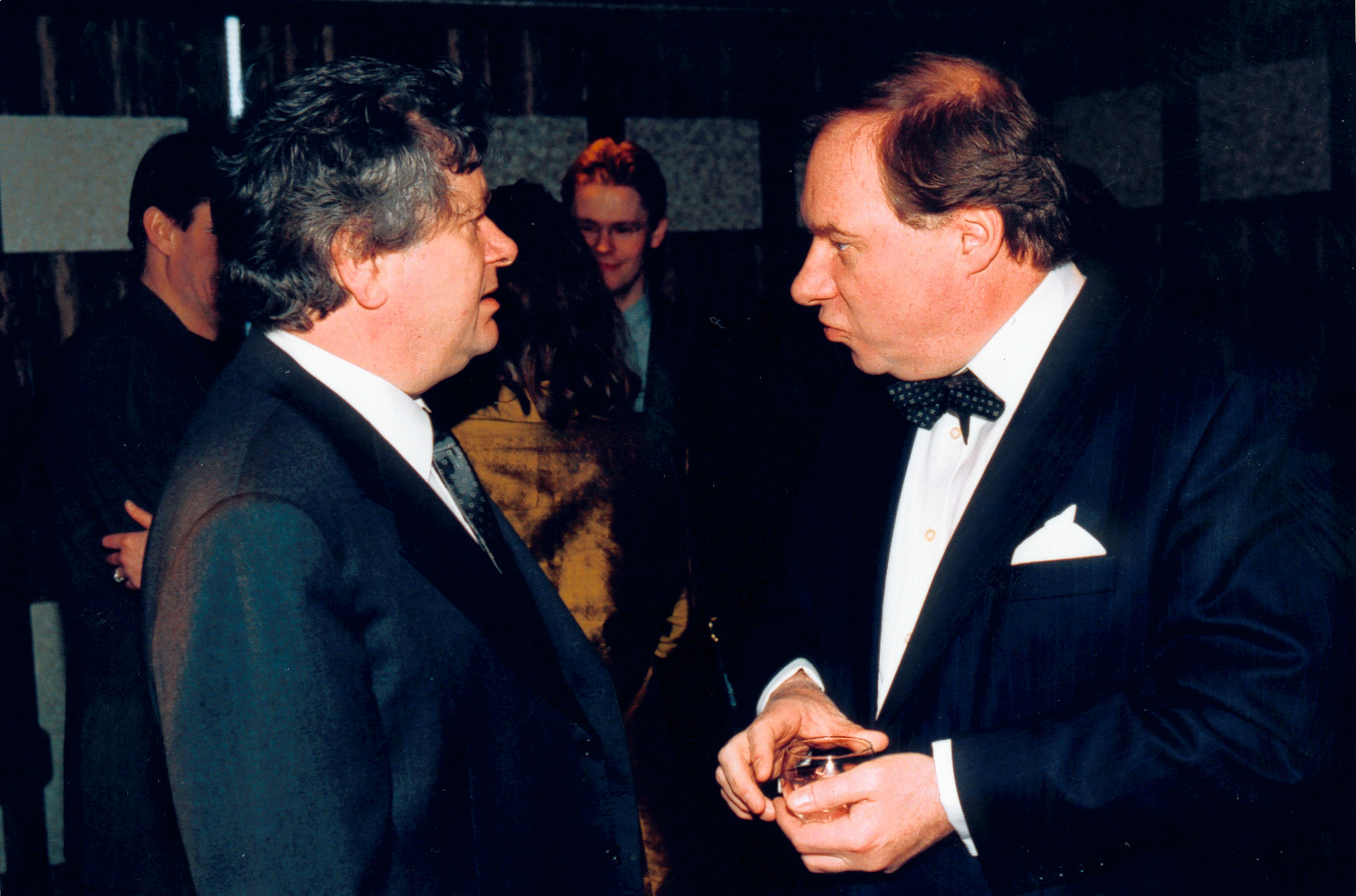
Davíð Oddsson at a birthday party 19 February 2003 with Kjartan Gunnarsson, the executive director of the Independence Party, and one of Davíð's closest friends and advisers

In 1994, the Social Democratic Party split, and as a result they suffered a huge loss in the 1995 parliamentary elections. The coalition government maintained its majority, but only by one seat. Davíð Oddsson therefore decided to form a coalition with the Progressive Party, whose leader, Halldór Ásgrímsson, became Minister of Foreign Affairs. In the new government, privatisation was continued on a much greater scale than before: a large and important chain of fish processing plants was sold; part-public or public investment funds were merged and sold as a private investment bank; the two commercial banks under government control were sold in a few stages; the two coalition parties accepted the loud demands from many people for a charge to be imposed on the holders of fishing quotas.

Davíð's two governments were staunch allies of the United States and strongly in support of NATO, of which Iceland is a founding member. He firmly supported the actions undertaken by the U.S. and its allies in Afghanistan and Iraq, taking much criticism from the Icelandic Left. Since the fall of the Soviet Union, there has been some uncertainty about whether the United States defence force could or should remain in Iceland, having been invited there in 1951, at the height of the Cold War. Davíð has not been enthusiastic about joining the European Union.

The latter Davíð Oddsson government (1995–2004) (under the influence of Milton Friedman's neoliberal ideas) embarked on a course of tax cuts. It cut the corporate income tax to 18%; it abolished the net wealth tax; it lowered the personal income tax and inheritance tax. This combination of opening up of the economy, fiscal and monetary stabilisation created an entrepreneurial climate in Iceland that spurred record economic growth in the country, with the real average income of individual households increasing by more than 17%, but was also one of the causes of the 2008–2011 Icelandic financial crisis.

=== Alliance with Progressive Party (1999–2004) ===
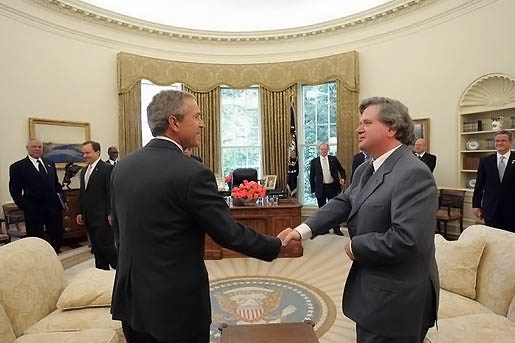
Davíð Oddsson with George W. Bush in the White House on 6 July 2004

As a young man, Davíð Oddsson authored or co-authored several stage and TV plays. During his days as political leader, he also pursued his literary interests, and in 1997 he published a collection of short stories, Nokkrir góðir dagar án Guðnýjar, which became a best-seller in Iceland. Davíð celebrated his 50th birthday at a huge reception in Perlan, paid for by the Independence Party, and his friends published a Festschrift of more than 500 pages to which many Icelandic writers, scholars and politicians contributed papers. In the 1999 parliamentary elections, Davíð's Independence Party retained strong support, despite an attempt by a former government minister of the party, Sverrir Hermannsson, to establish a splinter party: the minister had been appointed director of the National Bank of Iceland and had had to resign because of financial irregularities. In 2002, Davíð published another collection of short stories, Stolið frá höfundi stafrófsins, which was also well received.

However, in that same year, 2002, there began a controversy in Iceland about the Baugur Group, owned by the entrepreneurs Jóhannes Jónsson and his son, Jón Ásgeir Jóhannesson. A giant on the Icelandic scene, Baugur controlled the majority of the retail business in Iceland: in parliament, the then leader of the Social Democratic party, Össur Skarphéðinsson, called for closer supervision of possible monopoly pricing, specifically mentioning Baugur. Davíð concurred. In summer 2002, the Icelandic police raided the headquarters of Baugur, after a disgruntled former employee of their American operations had produced what he claimed was evidence of financial irregularities. The two main owners of Baugur did not take kindly to this, and accused Davíð of orchestrating a campaign against them. They bought a newspaper, Fréttablaðið, which is distributed free of charge to every household in Iceland. The paper opposed Davíð in the bitterly fought 2003 parliamentary election when there was talk of corruption, bribery and abuse of the police. In a speech on 9 February 2003, the main spokesperson of the Social Democratic Alliance, Ingibjörg Sólrún Gísladóttir, suggested that Davíð might be responsible for the tax investigation of businessman Jón Ólafsson, then owner of a private television station, and also for the police raid on Baugur. Paraphrasing Shakespeare, she asked: "Are you a friend of the Prime Minister or are you not; that is the question".

In 2003, he led the liberalization of the banking laws in Iceland allowing less transparency which brought a huge amount of foreign money and high interest rates.

==== Support for the Iraq War ====
On 18 March 2003, Davíð and Foreign Minister Halldór Ásgrímsson declared their support of the ultimatum issued by the United States, the United Kingdom and Spain at the Azores Summit, where the three countries announced their intention to invade Iraq if the government of Saddam Hussein did not step down. Due to Davíð and Halldór's declaration of support, Iceland was consequently put on the list of member states of the Coalition of the Willing. Davíð and Halldór did not consult the Parliament's foreign affairs committee before making the announcement, arguing that support for the Iraq War could not be considered a major foreign policy decision. Össur Skarphéðinsson, chairman of the Social Democratic Alliance, and Steingrímur J. Sigfússon, chairman of the Left-Green Movement, accused the government of breaking with parliamentary protocol by bypassing the foreign affairs committee while announcing its support for the war.

Davíð's government's support for the Iraq War was largely unpopular among the Icelandic public. Shortly after the outbreak of the war, 76 percent of responders declared themselves opposed to the government's support for the war in an opinion poll published by Fréttablaðið. In an opinion poll published by Gallup in 2005, 84 percent of responders declared their opposition to Iceland being on the list of the Coalition of the Willing.

=== Foreign minister (2004–2005) ===
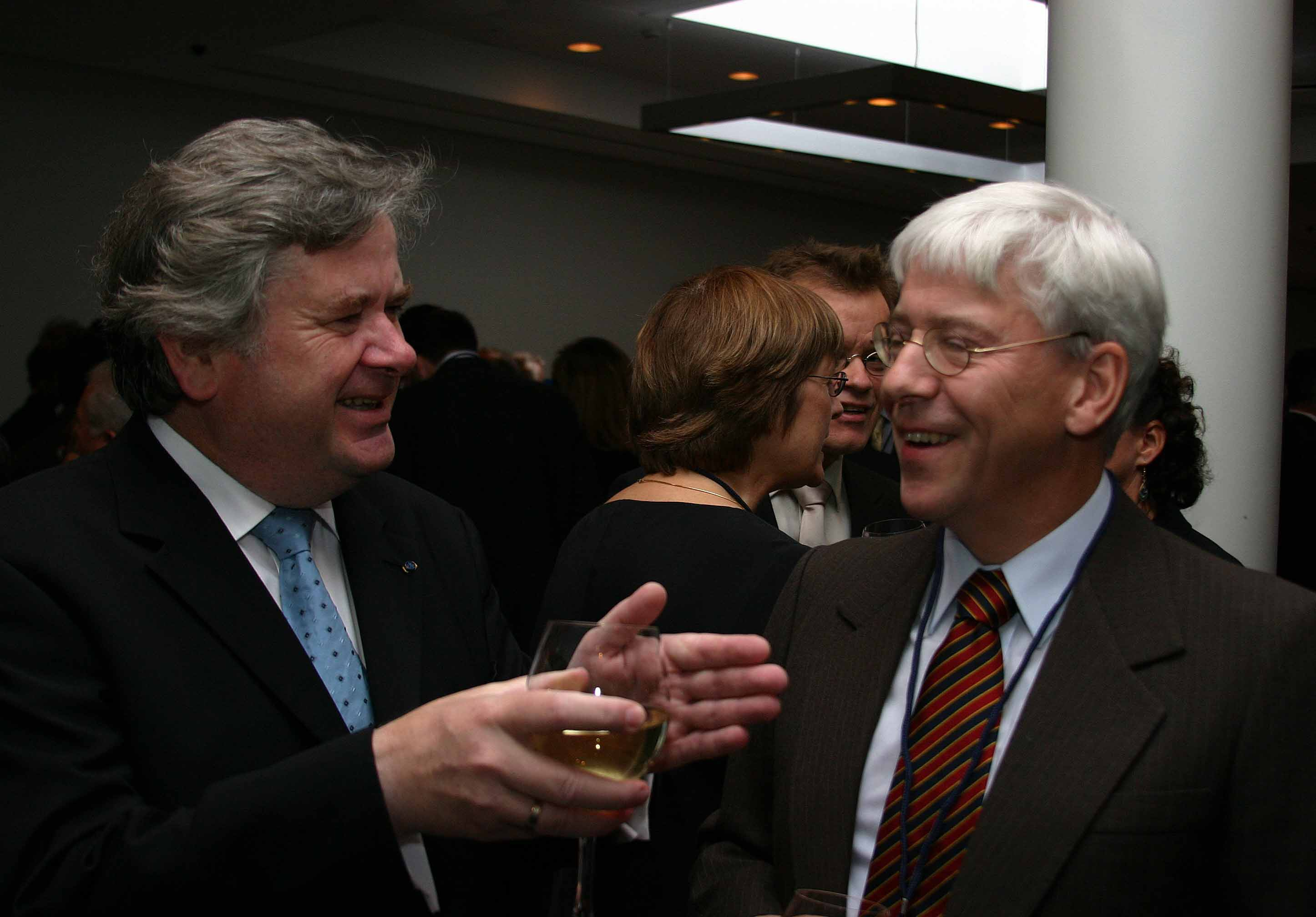
Davíð Oddsson with Professor Ragnar Árnason, a leading free market economist in Iceland, at a Mont Pelerin Society meeting in Iceland 20 August 2005

After the 2003 elections, Davíð Oddsson and the leader of his coalition partners, Halldór Ásgrímsson, Minister of Foreign Affairs, agreed that Davíð should remain prime minister until 15 September 2004, at which time Halldór would become prime minister, and that the Independence Party would, in exchange for relinquishing the Prime Minister's post, gain an additional ministry in the government from its partner.

In 2004, Davíð's government became embroiled in controversy, when he introduced a bill which would have made it impossible for large private companies to own more than 15% of any one media company, and under which newspapers and television stations could not be owned by the same company. Davíð argued that this was to prevent concentration of the media in the hands of a few people, and to enable the media to remain independent and critical not only towards politicians, but also towards financial moguls. His critics maintained, however, that the proposal was directly aimed at Baugur Group which they claimed Davíð regarded as a political enemy. By then, Baugur had bought another newspaper, the television station from Jón Ólafsson and a few radio stations, and controlled more than half of the media market. The Alþingi passed a much-softened version of the media bill. But in summer 2004, for the first time in the history of the Icelandic Republic, the president, Ólafur Ragnar Grímsson, refused to sign the bill into law. Davíð criticized this, pointing out that the director of the television station formerly owned by Jón Ólafsson and recently bought by Baugur, Sigurður G. Guðjónsson, had been Ólafur Ragnar's campaign manager in his first presidential campaign, and that Ólafur's daughter was employed by Baugur. However, Baugur enjoyed considerable goodwill in Iceland because their shops offered lower prices than competitors, while their owners, Jón Ásgeir Jóhannesson and Jóhannes Jónsson, were seen as an embodiment of an Icelandic dream of rags-to-riches. Many people agreed that the media bill seemed to be a part of a political duel rather than an attempt to make general law. The conclusion of the long struggle was that Davíð Oddsson withdrew the bill instead of holding a national referendum on it, as required by the Icelandic constitution in the event that the president refuses to sign a bill into law.

During his 14 years as prime minister, Davíð became acquainted with, or a friend of, many Western leaders, including Bill Clinton and George W. Bush of the United States, Václav Klaus of Czechoslovakia and Silvio Berlusconi of Italy. He has occasionally attended the meetings of the Bilderberg Group, and has read a paper to the Mont Pelerin Society. But he served as Minister of Foreign Affairs for only one year. In autumn 2005, Davíð announced that he would leave politics, saying that he felt the time had come for a new generation to take over. His close ally over many years, Geir Haarde, replaced him, as both leader of the Independence Party and Minister of Foreign Affairs. A probable contribution to this decision was a short, but dramatic, bout of cancer, soon after the crisis over the failure of the media bill.

=== Central Bank Governor (2005–2009) ===
In October 2005, Davíð was appointed the Governor of the Central Bank of Iceland, despite not having any formal education in economics. During the 2008–2011 Icelandic financial crisis, Iceland was forced to ask for financial help from the International Monetary Fund and friendly nations. Some blamed the collapse on the policies pursued by the Independence Party under Davíð's leadership, such as deregulation, market liberalisation and privatisation which led to investigations into the collapse and a trial. Consequently, there were public calls for Davíð's dismissal. Following protests outside the Central Bank, the new Prime Minister Jóhanna Sigurðardóttir requested that Davíð and his two fellow governors resign. He refused this request. On 26 February 2009, following changes to the laws concerning the Central Bank, Davíð was ousted from the bank and replaced by Norwegian economist Svein Harald Øygard.

In April 2009, Davíð stated that Iceland needed to investigate the "unusual and unconventional loans" given by the banks to senior politicians during the years before the crisis.

=== Editor of Morgunblaðið (2009–2026) ===
On 24 September 2009, the new owners of Morgunblaðið announced that Davíð Oddsson and Haraldur Johannessen, former editor of the business-oriented newspaper Viðskiptablaðið, had been hired as editors of the paper. The decision was announced in the wake of much speculation and rumours about who would be the new editor after the dismissal of the previous editor, Ólafur Þ. Stephensen. In the first year of Davíð's tenure as editor-in-chief, a third of Morgunblaðið's subscribers cancelled their subscriptions. In 2009, the paper lost 667 million ISK. In the report of the Icelandic parliament's Special Investigation Commission, published in April 2010, the appointment of Davíð Oddsson as editor-in-chief of Morgunblaðið and the firing of many experienced journalists from the newspaper is mentioned as an example of how the owners of media in Iceland engage in manipulation for political ends. "Their objective seems to be to run an opinion journalism and protect special interests rather than ensure a professional and fair reporting." On 2 March 2026, Morgunblaðið announced that Davíð Oddsson had died in his home the previous day.

=== 2016 presidential campaign ===
Davíð announced his bid to the Icelandic presidency on 8 May 2016 for the 2016 presidential election. After he announced his campaign, he shortly afterwards started to poll in as the second highest in the race. Davíð ended up finishing fourth in race with 13.7% of the popular vote. A lot of people have speculated that the reason for his bad performance in the election was because of people fully blaming him for the 2008–2011 Icelandic financial crisis. Another speculation for his bad performance was when he joked about the Iraq War during his campaigning.

=== Death ===
Davíð died at his home in Skerjafjörður on 1 March 2026, at the age of 78.

== Political views ==
=== Environmental issues ===
Throughout his political career, Davíð repeatedly engaged in various forms of climate change denial and criticized attempts to limit emissions of greenhouse gasses. Around the turn of the millennium, Davíð's government refused to make Iceland a party to the Kyoto Accords before extracting a concession that permitted the country to exclude what amounted to around 3.3 million tons of carbon dioxide from the country's obligations in the accords. In his 1997 new year's address, Davíð justified his stance by claiming it would be wrong to stoke people's fears on the basis of "sciences that rest on weak grounds". In a speech during the Independence Party's 2005 convention, Davíð reiterated his view that the Kyoto Accords were based on "very weak foundations" and that the public discourse about climate change tended to be based on "inscrutable emotionalism and, at worst, empty propaganda".

In televised debates during Davíð's 2016 candidacy for President of Iceland, he denied that he had doubted the scientific reality of climate change and noted that it was would not do to "deny the calculations and scientific tools". However, he reiterated his scepticism of ongoing attempts to combat climate change, stating that he believed them to be ineffectual without the full participation of countries like the United States, India and China.

During Davíð's tenure as editor-in-chief of Morgunblaðið, the paper continued to regularly publish editorials and opinion pieces denying the reality of climate change and criticizing efforts to combat it.

=== Support for Donald Trump ===
In 2018, Davíð said that he was an open supporter of the then-president of the United States, Donald Trump.

In January 2021, following the January 6 United States Capitol Attack, Davíð said that no president in the history of the United States had been more “wrongfully bullied" than Donald Trump. He also said that Joe Biden would be the "weakest president in American history".

In February 2024, Davíð criticized the Democratic Party and sent his support for Trump in the Prosecution of Donald Trump in New York trial.

== In popular culture ==
Davíð was the subject of parody, comedy, and caricature ever since taking public office. From 1989 to 2014, he was parodied regularly on Spaugstofan and the yearly Áramótaskaupið by comedian Örn Árnason, from 1986 to 2012, including in the sketch Dabbi Kóngur in 2001. In 2009, Davíð was part of an unused sketch for the Áramótaskaupið where he played Örn Árnason playing himself.

== See also ==
- List of Icelandic writers

Political offices
Preceded by Egill Skúli Ingibergsson	Mayor of Reykjavík; 1982–1991	Succeeded by Markús Örn Antonsson
Preceded by Steingrímur Hermannsson	Prime Minister of Iceland; 1991–2004	Succeeded by Halldór Ásgrímsson
Preceded by Halldór Ásgrímsson	Minister for Foreign Affairs; 2004–2005	Succeeded by Geir Haarde
Party political offices
Preceded by Þorsteinn Pálsson	Leader of the Independence Party; 1991–2005	Succeeded by Geir Haarde
Government offices
Preceded by Birgir Ísleifur Gunnarsson	Governor of the Central Bank; 2005–2009	Succeeded by Svein Harald Øygard
