= Ministry of Fisheries and Agriculture (Iceland) =

Government ministry of Iceland

Coordinates: 64°08′56″N 21°55′47″W

The Icelandic Ministry of Fisheries and Agriculture (Icelandic: Sjávarútvegs- og Landbúnaðarráðuneytið) is a cabinet-level ministry. It is an important economic ministry, with fisheries products making up about 40% of Iceland's exports.

== History ==
On 13 June 2007 the parliament of Iceland passed law changes to merge the Ministry of Fisheries and the Ministry of Agriculture, which took effect on 1 January 2008. In 2011 Steingrímur J. Sigfússon took on the roles of Minister of Fisheries and Agriculture and Minister of Economic Affairs. In 2012 the Ministry of Fisheries and Agriculture, the Ministry of Industry, Energy and Tourism and part of the Ministry of Economic Affairs merged to form the Ministry of Industries and Innovation (Atvinnuvega- og nýsköpunarráðuneytið), led by Steingrímur. Although since 2014, there are generally two ministers in the various cabinets, one for Fisheries and Agriculture and one for Industries and Innovation, the administrations are still combined.

== Ministers of Fisheries and Agriculture ==
- Sigurður Ingi Jóhannsson (23 May 2013 - 7 April 2016)
- Steingrímur J. Sigfússon 2011 - 2012
- Jón Bjarnason (10 May 2009 - 2011)
- Steingrímur J. Sigfússon (1 February 2009 – 10 May 2009)
- Einar Kristinn Guðfinnsson (1 January 2008 – 1 February 2009)

== Former Ministers of Fisheries ==
- Einar Kristinn Guðfinnsson (27 September 2005 – 31 December 2007)
- Árni M. Mathiesen (28 May 1999 – 27 September 2005)
- Þorsteinn Pálsson (30 April 1991 – 11 May 1999); Prime Minister Davíð Oddsson served as Minister of Fisheries between Þorsteinn's resignation on 11 May 1999 and the formation of the new cabinet the following 28 May.
- Halldór Ásgrímsson (26 May 1983 – 30 April 1991)
- Steingrímur Hermannsson (8 February 1980 – 26 May 1983)
- Kjartan Jóhannsson (1 September 1978 – 8 February 1980)
- Matthías Bjarnason (28 August 1974 – 1 September 1978)
- Lúðvík Jósepsson (14 July 1971 – 28 August 1974)
- Eggert G. Þorsteinsson (14 November 1963 – 14 July 1971)

== Former Ministers of Agriculture ==
- Guðni Ágústsson (1999–2007)
- Guðmundur Bjarnason (1995–1999)
- Halldór Blöndal (1991–1995)
- Steingrímur J. Sigfússon (1988–1991)
- Jón Helgason (1983–1988)
- Pálmi Jónsson (1980–1983)
- Bragi Sigurjónsson (1979–1980)
- Steingrímur Hermannsson (1978–1979)
- Halldór E. Sigurðsson (1971–1978)
- Ingólfur Jónsson (1959–1971)
- Friðjón Skarphéðinsson (1958–1959)
- Hermann Jónasson (1956–1958)
- Steingrímur Steinþórsson (1953–1956)
- Hermann Jónasson (1950–1953)
- Jón Pálmason (1949–1950)
- Bjarni Ásgeirsson (1947–1949)
- Pétur Magnússon (1944–1947)
