= Kjartan Jóhannsson =

Icelandic politician (1939–2020)

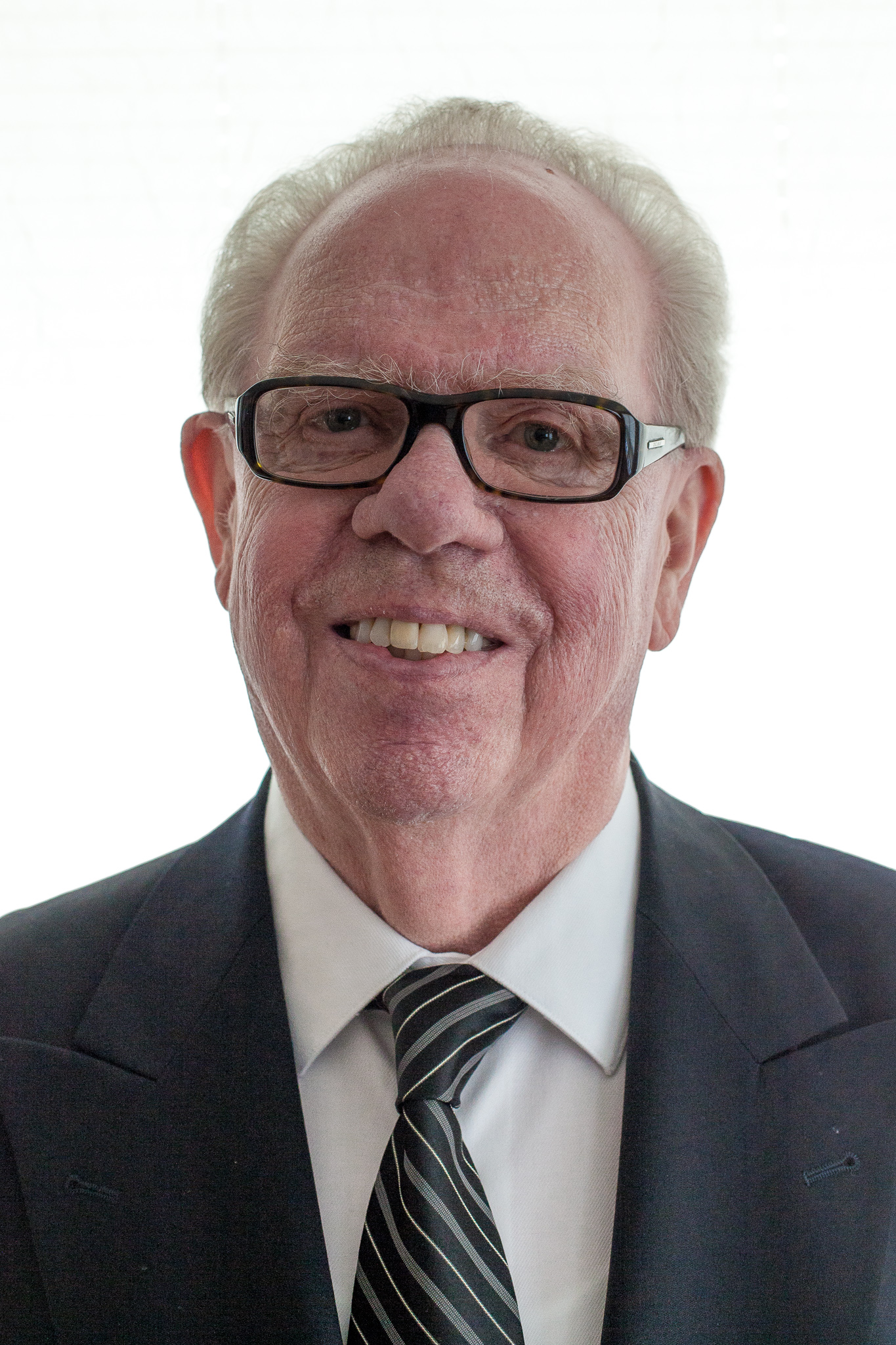

Minister of Commerce
- In office 15 October 1979 – 8 February 1980
- Prime Minister: Benedikt Sigurðsson Gröndal
- Preceded by: Svavar Gestsson
- Succeeded by: Tómas Árnason

Minister of Fisheries
- In office 1 September 1978 – 8 February 1980
- Prime Minister: Ólafur Jóhannesson; Benedikt Sigurðsson Gröndal
- Preceded by: Matthías Bjarnason
- Succeeded by: Steingrímur Hermannsson

Personal details
- Born: 19 December 1939 Reykjavík, Iceland
- Died: 13 November 2020 (aged 80)
- Party: Social Democratic Party

Kjartan Jóhannsson (19 December 1939 – 13 November 2020) was an Icelandic diplomat, politician, cabinet minister, and professor.

Kjartan was ambassador of Iceland to, among others, the European Union in Brussels, Belgium, as well as the UN and other international organizations in Geneva. He was secretary general of EFTA, a member of the Icelandic Parliament (Alþingi), chairman and vice chairman of the Icelandic Social Democratic Party, minister of fisheries and commerce, a consultant in management and management science, and an associate professor at the University of Iceland.

== Education ==
After graduating from Reykjavík Junior College, Kjartan went to Stockholm and studied civil engineering at the Royal Institute of Technology (Kungliga Tekniska Högskolan), receiving an M.S. in 1963. He also attended courses in business and management economics at the Stockholm University in 1964. In the autumn of 1964, he went to Chicago to study at the Illinois Institute of Technology on a Fulbright Scholarship, receiving an M.S. in industrial engineering in 1965 before continuing on a stipend from the Icelandic Scientific Fund and completing a PhD in the field of operations research.

== Career ==
=== Professional work ===
Kjartan taught at Reykjavík Junior College during 1963 as well as working part-time for an engineering consultancy and the Icelandic Road Administration from 1963 to 1965. From 1966 to 1978, he ran his own consulting firm in the fields of planning, management and operations research. He was a lecturer at the University of Iceland in the Department of Science and Engineering from 1966 to 1974, before being appointed an associate professor in the Department of Economics and Business Administration. This position he kept from 1974 to 1989, with a leave of absence from 1978 to 1980 while he was Minister of Fisheries and Commerce. Kjartan was among the pioneers of operations research in Iceland. In 1967, he along with two other academics, wrote the first ever computerized prediction program for Parliamentary elections in Iceland. Kjartan was appointed an honorary member of the Operations Research Society of Iceland in 2006.

=== Political career ===
Kjartan was elected to the executive council of the Social Democratic Party of Iceland in 1972 and as its vice chairman in 1974. That year he was also elected to the municipal council of the township of Hafnarfjörður on behalf of the party. He became a member of the Alþingi in 1978, and was re-elected three times, in 1979, 1983, and 1987. Appointed to the position of Minister of Fisheries in 1978, Kjartan quickly became known for his controversial views of conservation, more specifically regarding over-fishing and over-investment in the fisheries sector. He put a moratorium on investment in new fishing vessels and stopped fishing of select species where over-fishing was evident and advocated a quota system in fisheries. Most notably he put a total stop on capelin fishing at the point where scientists evaluated the remaining spawning stock had been brought down to 400 thousand tons. This has remained the benchmark ever since. As minister of fisheries, he was a vocal spokesman for Iceland in its conflict with Norway over capelin fishing rights, north of Iceland up to the Jan Mayen area.

As minister of commerce, in 1979, Kjartan abolished import restrictions on confectionery, bread and biscuits, making their trade free, which caused some turmoil initially. He was voted chairman of the Social Democratic Party in 1980, after challenging the sitting chairman, Benedikt Gröndal, who withdrew his candidacy. Kjartan's period as chair was tumultuous. A fraction of the party under the leadership of Vilmundur Gylfason broke away before the Parliamentary elections in 1983, forming the Alliance of Social Democrats and leading to a great loss of votes for the Social Democratic Party. In the following year Kjartan lost re-election for chairman to Jón Baldvin Hannibalsson.

During the period of 1986–89, Kjartan chaired committees and working groups proposing reforms in taxation; introducing 'pay-as-you-go' in income tax, replacing sales tax with value added tax, and reforming housing loans. Furthermore, he chaired a committee for evaluation of the development of European integration, in particular regarding the European Union's internal market. In 1988, Kjartan was elected speaker of the Lower Chamber of the Althing, a position he remained in until 1989.

He was member of the Parliamentary Committee of EFTA from 1985 to 1989, and was its chairman from 1985 to 1986. He took a leading role in the committee drafting a recommendation to the Ministerial Council of EFTA for positive response to the so-called 'Delors Initiative' for a closer relationship between EFTA and the EU.

He was also an initiator and in a leading role in the committee on the policy-making recommendation to the EFTA ministers to proceed towards complete liberalization in intra EFTA trade in fish, which was adopted in Hamar 24 June 1987, after two years of discussion.

=== Diplomatic career ===
Kjartan was appointed ambassador and permanent representative of Iceland to the UN and other international organizations in Geneva in 1989. In this capacity, he became member of the Council of EFTA. He was its chair 1989–90 and took part in drafting a formal position of EFTA to the then-newly gained freedom of the countries of Eastern and Central Europe, where EFTA invited these countries into negotiations on free trade agreements. Also in this capacity, he was on the Icelandic negotiating team for the establishment of the European Economic Area (EEA).

He represented Iceland in the Uruguay Round in the General Agreement on Tariffs and Trade (GATT) up to its conclusion at the ministerial meeting in Marrakesh and the establishment of the WTO as a successor to GATT. In a ministerial meeting in Geneva on 16 June 1993 the ministers of the EFTA countries Austria, Switzerland, Norway, Sweden, Finland, Iceland, and Liechtenstein decided to appoint Kjartan the next secretary general of EFTA, making him the first Icelander to head an international organization. He entered into office on 1 September 1994 at a time of great uncertainty as to EFTA's future. When three of its member countries joined the EU, the EFTA secretariat had to be radically reorganized, reducing staff by more than half while still maintaining the EFTA portion of the EEA agreement. During this time, EFTA expanded the network of free trade agreements in Europe and beyond. After 6 years as Secretary General, Kjartan rejoined the Icelandic Foreign Service and worked to prepare Iceland for upcoming negotiations with the EU on modifications of the EEA agreement upon admission of the eastern and central European countries to the EU. In 2002 Kjartan was appointed ambassador to Belgium, Liechtenstein, Luxembourg and Morocco as well as chief of mission to the EU and chief negotiator on behalf of Iceland in the previously mentioned negotiations. He remained in this post until November 2005, when he returned to Iceland for retirement.
