= Þórður Friðjónsson =

Icelandic economist

Thordur Fridjonsson (2 January 1952 – 8 February 2011) was an Icelandic economist and institutional leader.

== Career ==
Thordur Fridjonsson was chief executive of the NASDAQ OMX Iceland from 2002. Previous positions included being the General Director of the National Economic Institute from 1987 and Secretary General of the Ministry of Industry and Commerce (1998–1999). On Iceland’s behalf, Fridjonsson was a member of the Economic Policy Committee at OECD, an Alternate Governor at IMF and EBRD and Chairman of the Nordic Project Fund. Prior to this he was an economic advisor to Prime Minister's Gunnar Thoroddsen (1980–1983) and Steingrimur Hermannsson (1983–1986), lecturer at the Economic Department of the University of Iceland (1982–1987) and economist to the Association of Icelandic Manufacturers (Félag íslenskra iðnrekenda) (1978–1980).

== Education ==
Fridjonsson received the MA degree in economics from Queen's University in Canada in 1978 and the Cand.oecon. degree from the University of Iceland in 1977.

== Publications ==
Fridjonsson contributed articles on a range of contemporary economic issues in Iceland and edited The Icelandic economy explained (Íslensk haglýsing), 1986, AB, Reykjavík.
