= Halldór Ásgrímsson =

Icelandic politician

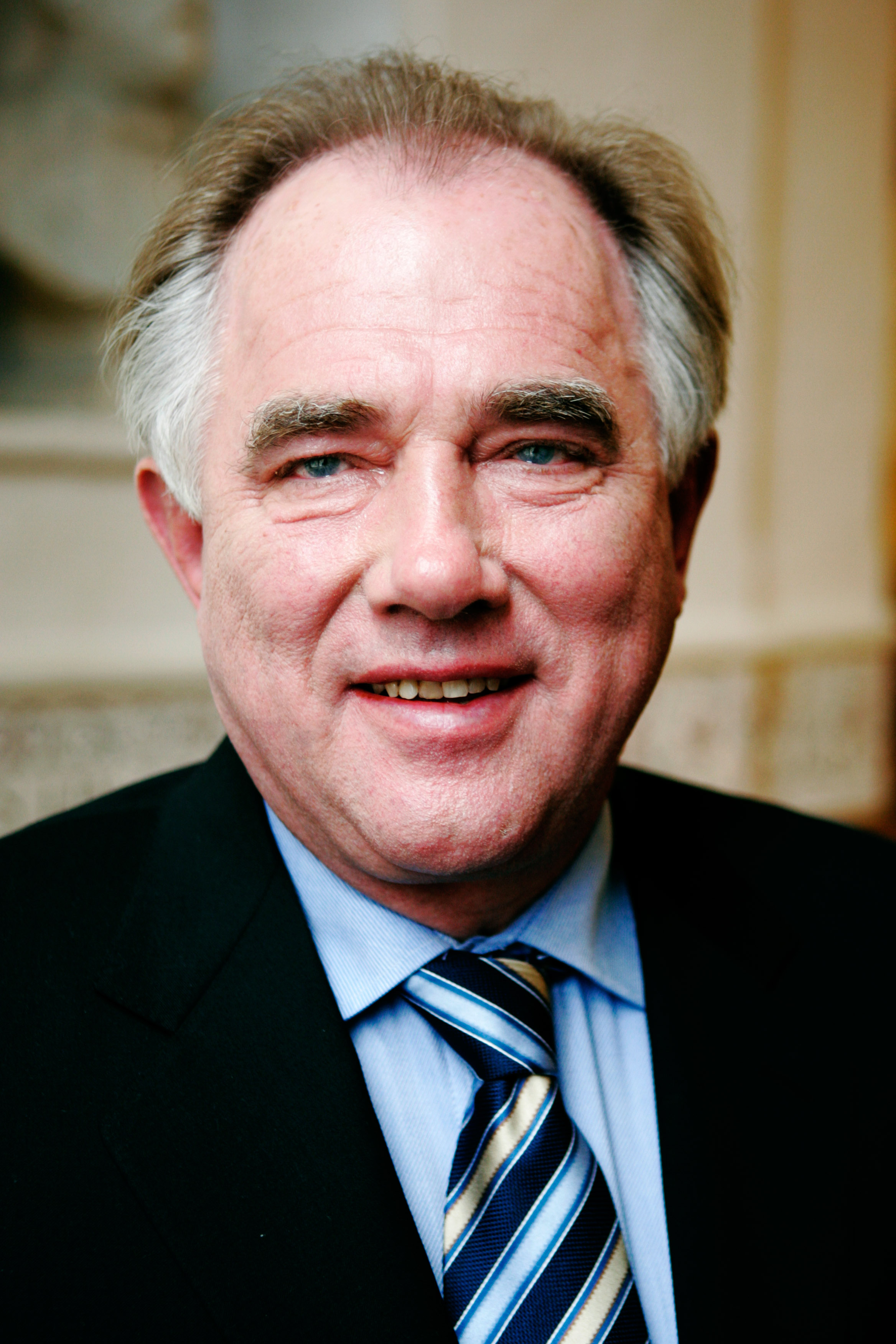
- Halldór in 2006

26th Prime Minister of Iceland
- In office 15 September 2004 – 15 June 2006
- President: Ólafur Ragnar Grímsson
- Preceded by: Davíð Oddsson
- Succeeded by: Geir Haarde

Secretary General for the Nordic Council of Ministers
- In office 1 January 2007 – 28 February 2013
- Preceded by: Per Unckel
- Succeeded by: Dagfinn Høybråten

Minister of Foreign Affairs
- In office 23 April 1995 – 15 September 2004
- Prime Minister: Davíð Oddsson
- Preceded by: Jón Baldvin Hannibalsson
- Succeeded by: Davíð Oddsson

Minister for Nordic Cooperation
- In office 23 April 1995 – 11 May 1999
- Prime Minister: Davið Oddsson
- Preceded by: Sighvatur Kristinn Björgvinsson
- Succeeded by: Siv Friðleifsdóttir

Minister of Fisheries
- In office 26 May 1983 – 30 April 1991
- Prime Minister: Steingrimur Hermannsson; Þorsteinn Pálsson
- Preceded by: Steingrimur Hermannsson
- Succeeded by: Þorsteinn Pálsson

Minister of Justice
- In office 28 September 1988 – 10 September 1989
- Prime Minister: Steingrimur Hermannsson
- Preceded by: Jón Sigurðsson
- Succeeded by: Óli Guðbjartssson

Personal details
- Born: 8 September 1947 Vopnafjörður, Iceland
- Died: 18 May 2015 (aged 67) Reykjavík, Iceland
- Party: Progressive Party
- Spouse: Sigurjóna Sigurðardóttir
- Children: 3
- Education: Bifröst University

Halldór Ásgrímsson (pronounced [ˈhalːˌtour ˈauːsˌkrimsˌsɔn]; 8 September 1947 – 18 May 2015) was an Icelandic politician, who served as prime minister of Iceland from 15 September 2004 to 15 June 2006 and was the leader of the Progressive Party from 1994 to 2006.

== Education and early life ==
Halldór studied at the Co-operative College in Bifröst, and became a certified public accountant in 1970. He later completed graduate commerce studies at the Universities of Bergen and Copenhagen, and worked as a lecturer at the University of Iceland from 1973 to 1975.

== Political career ==
He represented the Eastern constituency as a member of the Althing (Icelandic parliament) from 1974 to 1978 and from 1979 to 2003, when he was elected to represent the Reykjavík North constituency. Over the years, he served in a large number of ministerial portfolios, namely as Minister of Fisheries from 1983 to 1991, Minister of Justice and Ecclesiastical Affairs from 1988 to 1989, Minister for Nordic Cooperation from 1985 to 1987 and 1995 to 1999 and Minister of Foreign Affairs from 1995 to 2004. As Minister of Foreign Affairs, Halldór put Iceland on the Coalition of the Willing, the alliance supporting the 2003 invasion of Iraq.

Halldór took over as prime minister on 15 September 2004, succeeding Independence Party leader Davíð Oddsson, while Davíð replaced Halldór as Foreign Minister.

On 5 June 2006, following poor results for his party in the 2006 Icelandic municipalities elections, Halldór announced his resignation as prime minister and stated that he intended to step down as leader of the Progressive Party in August 2006, and leave politics altogether. Geir H. Haarde, the Foreign Minister of Iceland, succeeded him on 15 June 2006.

Halldór Ásgrímsson's successor as Progressive Party leader was Jón Sigurðsson, Ministry of Industry, Energy and Tourism, who was elected at the party's convention in August 2006. At the convention, Halldór ended his political career with an emotional and dynamic farewell speech to the party. When Halldór resigned as MP after the convention, he was the longest serving Icelandic MP at the time.

On 31 October 2006, Halldór was chosen as the Secretary-General of the Nordic Council of Ministers. Halldór Ásgrímsson was an Honorary Member of The International Raoul Wallenberg Foundation.

He died of a heart attack at a Reykjavík hospital in May 2015. His casket was carried by prime minister, Sigmundur Davíð Gunnlaugsson and his long-life partner, Davíð Oddsson.

Political offices
Preceded by Steingrímur Hermannsson	Minister of Fisheries; 1983–1991	Succeeded by Þorsteinn Pálsson
Preceded by Jón Sigurðsson	Minister of Justice and Ecclesiastical Affairs; 1988–1989	Succeeded by Óli Guðbjartssson
Preceded by Jón Baldvin Hannibalsson	Minister of Foreign Affairs; 1995–2004	Succeeded by Geir Haarde
Preceded by Sighvatur Kristinn Björgvinsson	Minister for Nordic Cooperation; 1995–1999	Succeeded by Siv Friðleifsdóttir
Preceded by Davíð Oddsson	Prime Minister of Iceland; 2004–2006	Succeeded by Geir Haarde
Party political offices
Preceded by Steingrímur Hermannsson	Leader of the Progressive Party; 1994–2006	Succeeded by Jón Sigurðsson
