= Ragnhildur Helgadóttir =

Icelandic politician (1930–2016)

Ragnhildur Helgadóttir (also Ragnhild Helgadóttir; 1930–2016) was an Icelandic politician. She was a member of the Icelandic parliament, the Althing, first from 1956 for the Independence Party. From 1961 to December 1962 she was the First President of the Lower House, and she was president of the parliament several times. From 1983 to 1987 she was a government minister, first of education, then of health, social affairs and communication.

== Early life ==
Ragnhildur was born 26 May 1930 in Reykjavík, the daughter of Helgi Tómasson, a physician and longtime chairman of the Scouts organisation Bandalag íslenskra skáta.

== Career ==
She was elected member of the Althing in 1956 as a candidate of the Independence Party. At the time, she was 26 years old, and became the youngest female ever elected to the Althing.

She served initially until 1963, from 1956 to 1959 as the only female member. She was in 1959 second vice-president of the Althing, from 1959 to 1960 second vice-president of the Lower House, from 1961 to 1962 Speaker of the Lower House of the Althing, from 1962 to 1963 again second vice president.

In 1971 she was again a member of parliament and belonged to the Second Chamber until 1979. She was again Speaker from 1974 to 1978. In 1975 she was appointed president of the Nordic Council.

She was again a member of parliament from 1983 in the Lower House until 1991, when the previous two-chamber system was abolished. In May 1983 she was appointed by Prime Minister Steingrímur Hermannsson as Minister of Education in his government. From 1985 until July 1987, she was Minister of Health, Social Affairs and Communication.

Ragnhildur died 29 January 2016.
