= Jón Helgason (minister) =

Icelandic politician (1931–2019)

Jón Helgason (4 October 1931 – 2 April 2019) was an Icelandic politician and former government minister. He was a member of Alþingi from 1974 to 1995, and the speaker from 1979 to 1983. Jón served as the Minister of Justice and Ecclesiastical Affairs from 1983 to 1987 and the Minister of Agriculture from 1987 to 1988.

== Personal life ==
Jón was married to Guðrún Þorkelsdóttur in 1961 and together they had two children and one foster child.
