= Steingrímur Hermannsson =

Icelandic politician (1928–2010)

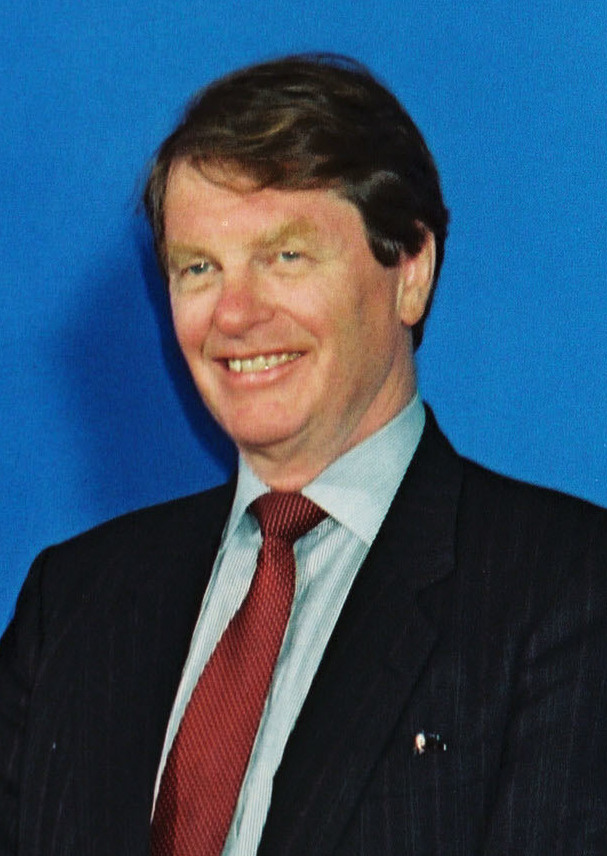

23rd and 25th Prime Minister of Iceland
- In office 28 September 1988 – 30 April 1991
- President: Vigdís Finnbogadóttir
- Preceded by: Þorsteinn Pálsson
- Succeeded by: Davíð Oddsson
- In office 26 May 1983 – 8 July 1987
- President: Vigdís Finnbogadóttir
- Preceded by: Gunnar Thoroddsen
- Succeeded by: Þorsteinn Pálsson

Minister of Foreign Affairs
- In office 8 July 1987 – 28 September 1988
- Prime Minister: Þorsteinn Pálsson
- Preceded by: Matthías Árni Mathiesen
- Succeeded by: Jón Baldvin Hannibalsson

Minister of Fisheries
- In office 8 February 1980 – 26 May 1983
- Prime Minister: Gunnar Thoroddsen
- Preceded by: Kjartan Jóhannsson
- Succeeded by: Halldór Ásgrímsson

Minister of Justice
- In office 1 September 1978 – 15 October 1979
- Prime Minister: Ólafur Jóhannesson
- Preceded by: Ólafur Jóhannesson
- Succeeded by: Vilmundur Gylfason

Personal details
- Born: 22 June 1928 Reykjavík, Kingdom of Iceland
- Died: 1 February 2010 (aged 81) Reykjavík, Iceland
- Party: Progressive
- Children: 6
- Education: Illinois Institute of Technology; California Institute of Technology

Steingrímur Hermannsson (pronounced [ˈsteinkrimur ˈhɛrmanˌsɔn]; 22 June 1928 – 1 February 2010) was an Icelandic politician who served as prime minister of Iceland from 1983 to 1987, and again from 1988 to 1991. He was the chairman for the Progressive Party from 1979 to 1994.

Steingrímur's father, Hermann Jónasson also served as Iceland's prime minister from 1934 to 1942 and again from 1956 to 1958. Steingrímur's son, Guðmundur Steingrímsson ran as the chairman for his own party in the 2013 parliamentary election.

== Early childhood ==
Steingrímur's father was Hermann Jónasson, another former Prime Minister. Being the son of a prominent official, Steingrímur enjoyed a relatively care-free upbringing in a country stricken by the Great Depression. As a young boy he had an exceptional proximity to Iceland's World War II politics, overhearing state affairs being discussed in his father's living room.

== Education ==
Not wanting to follow his father's footsteps into politics, Steingrímur went to the U.S. in 1948. He received a bachelor's degree in electrical engineering from Illinois Institute of Technology in 1951 and a master's degree from Caltech in 1952. After returning to his native country and experiencing troubles both in his private life and business career, he eventually entered politics in the 1960s. He was elected to the Althing (Icelandic Parliament) in 1971 for the Progressive Party, the party of his father. He became party chairman in 1979.

== Politics ==
Steingrímur served as Prime Minister from 1983 to 1987 and again from 1988 to 1991. He also served for a time as Minister of Justice, Ecclesiastical Affairs and Agriculture (1978–79), Minister of Fisheries and Communications (1980–83) and Minister of Foreign Affairs (1987–88). He was chairman of the Progressive Party from 1979 to 1994. After that he was governor of the Central Bank of Iceland until his retirement in 1998.

=== International affairs ===
Internationally, his greatest moment as Prime Minister came in 1986, when he hosted the Reykjavík Summit of Soviet General Secretary Mikhail Gorbachev and US President Ronald Reagan. Although not considered a success at the time, the summit paved the way for the ending of the Cold War, and the Icelandic government's management of the event was widely commended. In 1991, during the January Events in Lithuania, Steingrímur expressed strong support for Vytautas Landsbergis, Chairman of Lithuanian Parliament. Shortly after, Iceland was the first country to recognize the independence of Lithuania from the Soviet Union.

Steingrímur first kept a low profile in his retirement, rarely voicing his opinion of current affairs. He was however a founding member of Heimssýn, an organization opposed to Iceland's entry into the European Union, and became increasingly critical of the Progressive Party's policies. He gave public support to "The Iceland Movement", an ad hoc environmental movement which ran (unsuccessfully) in the 2007 Althing elections, appearing in campaign advertisements on TV. As a result of these activities, he mostly lost the informal status of the Progressive Party's "Grand Old Man".

In his last years Steingrímur was a well liked and respected elder statesman, and was considered as a potential candidate for the 1996 presidential elections. But he quickly declined that honour, stating his intention to retire at the age of 70. His memoirs, published in three volumes in 1998–2000, became bestsellers.

By 2007, Steingrímur had left the Progressive Party, after it had turned more to the right and he appeared in TV-ads advertising the Icelandic Movement party.

During a eulogy made by former Canadian prime minister Brian Mulroney at George H. W. Bush' state funeral in 2018, Mulroney joked about Steingrímur's often long speeches.

== Family ==
Steingrímur was twice married and had six children. His youngest son, Guðmundur Steingrímsson was active in Icelandic politics between 2007 and 2016. He first ran for the Althing in the 2007 elections, for the Social Democratic Alliance. In early 2009, however, he switched sides and joined his grandfather's and father's Progressive Party and got elected. Then switched again and got elected in 2013 for his own party as a chairman, Bright Future, where he attempted to become a prime minister just like his father and grandfather.

His eldest children, John, Ellen, and Neil Hermannsson reside in the United States with their own children, all of whom have been to Iceland.

Party political offices
| Preceded by Ólafur Jóhannesson | Leader of the Progressive Party; 1979–1994 | Succeeded by Halldór Ásgrímsson |
Political offices
| Preceded by Kjartan Jóhannsson | Minister of Fisheries; 1980–1983 | Succeeded by Halldór Ásgrímsson |
| Preceded by Gunnar Thoroddsen | Prime Minister of Iceland; 1983–1987 | Succeeded by Þorsteinn Pálsson |
| Preceded by Matthías Mathiesen | Minister of Foreign Affairs; 1987–1988 | Succeeded by Jón Baldvin Hannibalsson |
| Preceded by Ólafur Jóhannesson | Minister of Justice; 1978–1979 | Succeeded by Vilmundur Gylfason |
| Preceded by Þorsteinn Pálsson | Prime Minister of Iceland; 1988–1991 | Succeeded by Davíð Oddsson |
