= Matthías Árni Mathiesen =

Icelandic politician (1931–2011)

Matthías Árnason Mathiesen (6 August 1931 in Hafnarfjörður – 9 November 2011 in Hafnarfjörður) was an Icelandic politician and former minister. He was the Minister of Finance of Iceland from 1974 to 1978.
