= Western (Althing constituency) =

Former constituency of the Althing, the national legislature of Iceland

- Vesturland
- Former Constituency for the Althing
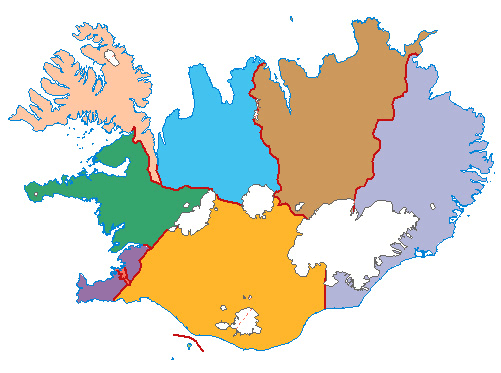
- Althing constituencies between 1959 and 2003
- Municipality: List: Akranes; Borgarbyggð; Borgarfjarðarsveit; Dalabyggð; Eyja-og Miklaholtshreppur; Eyrarsveit; Helgafellssveit; Hvalfjarðarstrandarhreppur; Hvítársíðuhreppur; Innri-Akraneshreppur; Kolbeinsstaðahreppur; Leirár-og Melahreppur; Saurbæjarhreppur; Skilmannahreppur; Skorradalshreppur; Snæfellsbær; Stykkishólmur
- Region: Western

Former Constituency
- Created: 1959
- Abolished: 2003
- Seats: List (Note: Excludes compensatory seats.): 4 (1987–2003); 5 (1959–1987)
- Created from: List: Borgarfjarðarsýsla; Dalasýsla; Mýrasýsla; Snæfellsnessýsla
- Replaced by: Northwest

Western (Icelandic: Vesturland) was one of the multi-member constituencies of the Althing, the national legislature of Iceland. The constituency was established in 1959 following the nationwide extension of proportional representation for elections to the Althing. It was abolished in 2003 when the constituency was merged into the Northwestern constituency following the re-organisation of constituencies across Iceland. Western was conterminous with the Western region.

== Election results ==
=== Summary ===
Election	People's Alliance G			Left-Green U			Social Democrats S / A			Progressive B			Independence D		
Election	Votes	%	Seats	Votes	%	Seats	Votes	%	Seats	Votes	%	Seats	Votes	%	Seats
1999				823	9.71%	0	2,212	26.11%	1	2,411	28.46%	1	2,826	33.35%	2
1995	1,148	13.31%	0				1,010	11.71%	0	2,943	34.13%	2	2,602	30.18%	2
1991	1,513	17.34%	1				1,233	14.13%	1	2,485	28.47%	1	2,525	28.93%	1
1987	971	10.84%	1				1,356	15.14%	1	2,299	25.67%	1	2,164	24.17%	1
1983	1,193	15.21%	1				1,059	13.50%	0	2,369	30.21%	2	2,725	34.74%	2
1979	1,203	16.04%	1				1,165	15.53%	1	2,812	37.49%	2	2,320	30.93%	1
1978	1,477	19.98%	1				1,718	23.24%	1	1,968	26.62%	2	1,920	25.97%	1
1974	1,179	16.61%	1				771	10.87%	0	2,526	35.60%	2	2,374	33.46%	2
1971	932	13.97%	1				723	10.84%	0	2,483	37.23%	2	1,930	28.94%	2
1967	827	13.21%	0				977	15.60%	1	2,381	38.02%	2	2,077	33.17%	2
1963	739	12.25%	0				912	15.12%	1	2,363	39.17%	2	2,019	33.47%	2
1959 Oct	686	11.49%	0				926	15.51%	1	2,236	37.45%	2	2,123	35.56%	2

(Excludes compensatory seats.)

=== Detailed ===
==== 1990s ====
===== 1999 =====
Results of the 1999 parliamentary election held on 8 May 1999:

Party		Votes	%	Seats		
Party		Votes	%	Con.	Com.	Tot.
Independence Party	D	2,826	33.35%	2	0	2
Progressive Party	B	2,411	28.46%	1	0	1
Social Democratic Alliance	S	2,212	26.11%	1	1	2
Left-Green Movement	U	823	9.71%	0	0	0
Liberal Party	F	169	1.99%	0	0	0
Humanist Party	H	32	0.38%	0	0	0
Valid votes		8,473	100.00%	4	1	5
Blank votes		155	1.79%			
Rejected votes – other		14	0.16%			
Total polled		8,642	88.70%			
Registered electors		9,743				

The following candidates were elected: Gísli S. Einarsson (S), 2,191 votes; Guðjón Guðmundsson (D), 2,814 votes; Ingibjörg Pálmadóttir (B), 2,398 votes; Jóhann Ársælsson (S), 2,207 votes; and Sturla Böðvarsson (D), 2,802 votes.

===== 1995 =====
Results of the 1995 parliamentary election held on 8 April 1995:

Party		Votes	%	Seats		
Party		Votes	%	Con.	Com.	Tot.
Progressive Party	B	2,943	34.13%	2	0	2
Independence Party	D	2,602	30.18%	2	0	2
People's Alliance	G	1,148	13.31%	0	0	0
Social Democratic Party	A	1,010	11.71%	0	1	1
National Awakening	J	568	6.59%	0	0	0
Women's List	V	324	3.76%	0	0	0
Natural Law Party	N	28	0.32%	0	0	0
Valid votes		8,623	100.00%	4	1	5
Blank votes		115	1.31%			
Rejected votes – other		27	0.31%			
Total polled		8,765	88.98%			
Registered electors		9,850				

The following candidates were elected: Gísli S. Einarsson (A), 1,006 votes; Guðjón Guðmundsson (D), 2,596 votes; Ingibjörg Pálmadóttir (B), 2,924 votes; Magnús Stefánsson (B), 2,934 votes; and Sturla Böðvarsson (D), 2,593 votes.

===== 1991 =====
Results of the 1991 parliamentary election held on 20 April 1991:

Party		Votes	%	Seats		
Party		Votes	%	Con.	Com.	Tot.
Independence Party	D	2,525	28.93%	1	1	2
Progressive Party	B	2,485	28.47%	1	0	1
People's Alliance	G	1,513	17.34%	1	0	1
Social Democratic Party	A	1,233	14.13%	1	0	1
Women's List	V	591	6.77%	0	0	0
Home Rule Association	H	178	2.04%	0	0	0
Liberals	F	124	1.42%	0	0	0
National Party and Humanist Party	Þ	79	0.91%	0	0	0
Valid votes		8,728	100.00%	4	1	5
Blank votes		133	1.50%			
Rejected votes – other		9	0.10%			
Total polled		8,870	89.85%			
Registered electors		9,872				

The following candidates were elected: Eiður Svanberg Guðnason (A), 1,228 votes; Guðjón Guðmundsson (D), 2,523 votes; Ingibjörg Pálmadóttir (B), 2,465 votes; Jóhann Ársælsson (G), 1,513 votes; and Sturla Böðvarsson (D), 2,523 votes.

==== 1980s ====
===== 1987 =====
Results of the 1987 parliamentary election held on 25 April 1987:

Party		Votes	%	Seats		
Party		Votes	%	Con.	Com.	Tot.
Progressive Party	B	2,299	25.67%	1	0	1
Independence Party	D	2,164	24.17%	1	0	1
Social Democratic Party	A	1,356	15.14%	1	0	1
People's Alliance	G	971	10.84%	1	0	1
Citizens' Party	S	936	10.45%	0	1	1
Women's List	V	926	10.34%	0	1	1
National Party	Þ	156	1.74%	0	0	0
Humanist Party	M	147	1.64%	0	0	0
Valid votes		8,955	100.00%	4	2	6
Blank votes		150	1.65%			
Rejected votes – other		13	0.14%			
Total polled		9,118	91.09%			
Registered electors		10,010				

The following candidates were elected: Alexander Stefánsson (B), 2,219 votes; Danfríður Kristín Skarphéðinsdóttir (V), 925 votes; Eiður Svanberg Guðnason (A), 1,342 votes; Friðjón Þórðarson (D), 2,110 votes; Ingi Björn Albertsson (S), 935 votes; and Skúli Alexandersson (G), 956 votes.

===== 1983 =====
Results of the 1983 parliamentary election held on 23 April 1983:

Party		Votes	%	Seats		
Party		Votes	%	Con.	Com.	Tot.
Independence Party	D	2,725	34.74%	2	0	2
Progressive Party	B	2,369	30.21%	2	0	2
People's Alliance	G	1,193	15.21%	1	0	1
Social Democratic Party	A	1,059	13.50%	0	1	1
Alliance of Social Democrats	C	497	6.34%	0	0	0
Valid votes		7,843	100.00%	5	1	6
Blank votes		238	2.93%			
Rejected votes – other		55	0.68%			
Total polled		8,136	88.29%			
Registered electors		9,215				

The following candidates were elected: Alexander Stefánsson (B), 2,367 votes; Davíð Aðalsteinsson (B), 2,130 votes; Eiður Svanberg Guðnason (A), 1,059 votes; Friðjón Þórðarson (D), 2,714 votes; Skúli Alexandersson (G), 1,187 votes; and Valdimar Indriðason (D), 2,452 votes.

==== 1970s ====
===== 1979 =====
Results of the 1979 parliamentary election held on 2 and 3 December 1979:

Party		Votes	%	Seats		
Party		Votes	%	Con.	Com.	Tot.
Progressive Party	B	2,812	37.49%	2	0	2
Independence Party	D	2,320	30.93%	1	1	2
People's Alliance	G	1,203	16.04%	1	0	1
Social Democratic Party	A	1,165	15.53%	1	0	1
Valid votes		7,500	100.00%	5	1	6
Blank votes		204	2.63%			
Rejected votes – other		48	0.62%			
Total polled		7,752	89.32%			
Registered electors		8,679				

The following candidates were elected: Alexander Stefánsson (B), 2,806 votes; Davíð Aðalsteinsson (B), 2,531 votes; Eiður Svanberg Guðnason (A), 1,165 votes; Friðjón Þórðarson (D), 2,302 votes; Jósef H. Þorgeirsson (D), 2,061 votes; and Skúli Alexandersson (G), 1,201 votes.

===== 1978 =====
Results of the 1978 parliamentary election held on 25 June 1978:

Party		Votes	%	Seats		
Party		Votes	%	Con.	Com.	Tot.
Progressive Party	B	1,968	26.62%	2	0	2
Independence Party	D	1,920	25.97%	1	1	2
Social Democratic Party	A	1,718	23.24%	1	1	2
People's Alliance	G	1,477	19.98%	1	0	1
Union of Liberals and Leftists	F	310	4.19%	0	0	0
Valid votes		7,393	100.00%	5	2	7
Blank votes		138	1.83%			
Rejected votes – other		30	0.40%			
Total polled		7,561	90.03%			
Registered electors		8,398				

The following candidates were elected: Alexander Stefánsson (B), 1,763 votes; Bragi Níelsson (A), 1,546 votes; Eiður Svanberg Guðnason (A), 1,718 votes; Friðjón Þórðarson (D), 1,915 votes; Halldór Eggert Sigurðsson (B), 1,963 votes; Jónas Árnason (G), 1,470 votes; and Jósef H. Þorgeirsson (D), 1,721 votes.

===== 1974 =====
Results of the 1974 parliamentary election held on 30 June 1974:

Party		Votes	%	Seats		
Party		Votes	%	Con.	Com.	Tot.
Progressive Party	B	2,526	35.60%	2	0	2
Independence Party	D	2,374	33.46%	2	0	2
People's Alliance	G	1,179	16.61%	1	0	1
Social Democratic Party	A	771	10.87%	0	1	1
Union of Liberals and Leftists	F	246	3.47%	0	0	0
Valid votes		7,096	100.00%	5	1	6
Blank votes		82	1.14%			
Rejected votes – other		17	0.24%			
Total polled		7,195	91.83%			
Registered electors		7,835				

The following candidates were elected: Ásgeir Bjarnason (B), 2,525 votes; Benedikt Sigurðsson Gröndal (A), 771 votes; Friðjón Þórðarson (D), 2,125 votes; Halldór Eggert Sigurðsson (B), 2,272 votes; Jón Árnason (D), 2,368 votes; and Jónas Árnason (G), 1,178 votes.

===== 1971 =====
Results of the 1971 parliamentary election held on 13 June 1971:

Party		Votes	%	Seats		
Party		Votes	%	Con.	Com.	Tot.
Progressive Party	B	2,483	37.23%	2	0	2
Independence Party	D	1,930	28.94%	2	0	2
People's Alliance	G	932	13.97%	1	0	1
Social Democratic Party	A	723	10.84%	0	1	1
Union of Liberals and Leftists	F	602	9.03%	0	0	0
Valid votes		6,670	100.00%	5	1	6
Blank votes		91	1.34%			
Rejected votes – other		21	0.31%			
Total polled		6,782	92.08%			
Registered electors		7,365				

The following candidates were elected: Ásgeir Bjarnason (B), 2,481 votes; Benedikt Sigurðsson Gröndal (A), 723 votes; Friðjón Þórðarson (D), 1,734 votes; Halldór Eggert Sigurðsson (B), 2,233 votes; Jón Árnason (D), 1,928 votes; and Jónas Árnason (G), 931 votes.

==== 1960s ====
===== 1967 =====
Results of the 1967 parliamentary election held on 11 June 1967:

Party		Votes	%	Seats		
Party		Votes	%	Con.	Com.	Tot.
Progressive Party	B	2,381	38.02%	2	0	2
Independence Party	D	2,077	33.17%	2	0	2
Social Democratic Party	A	977	15.60%	1	0	1
People's Alliance	G	827	13.21%	0	1	1
Valid votes		6,262	100.00%	5	1	6
Blank votes		108	1.69%			
Rejected votes – other		11	0.17%			
Total polled		6,381	92.46%			
Registered electors		6,901				

The following candidates were elected: Ásgeir Bjarnason (B), 2,381 votes; Benedikt Sigurðsson Gröndal (A), 977 votes; Friðjón Þórðarson (D), 1,867 votes; Halldór Eggert Sigurðsson (B), 2,141 votes; Jón Árnason (D), 2,076 votes; and Jónas Árnason (G), 827 votes.

===== 1963 =====
Results of the 1963 parliamentary election held on 9 June 1963:

Party		Votes	%	Seats		
Party		Votes	%	Con.	Com.	Tot.
Progressive Party	B	2,363	39.17%	2	0	2
Independence Party	D	2,019	33.47%	2	0	2
Social Democratic Party	A	912	15.12%	1	0	1
People's Alliance	G	739	12.25%	0	0	0
Valid votes		6,033	100.00%	5	0	5
Blank votes		93	1.51%			
Rejected votes – other		20	0.33%			
Total polled		6,146	92.70%			
Registered electors		6,630				

The following candidates were elected: Ásgeir Bjarnason (B), 2,363 votes; Benedikt Sigurðsson Gröndal (A), 912 votes; Halldór Eggert Sigurðsson (B), 2,125 votes; Jón Árnason (D), 1,814 votes; and Sigurður Ágústsson (D), 2,015 votes.

==== 1950s ====
===== October 1959 =====
Results of the October 1959 parliamentary election held on 25 and 26 October 1959:

Party		Votes	%	Seats		
Party		Votes	%	Con.	Com.	Tot.
Progressive Party	B	2,236	37.45%	2	0	2
Independence Party	D	2,123	35.56%	2	0	2
Social Democratic Party	A	926	15.51%	1	0	1
People's Alliance	G	686	11.49%	0	0	0
Valid votes		5,971	100.00%	5	0	5
Blank votes		81	1.33%			
Rejected votes – other		16	0.26%			
Total polled		6,068	93.22%			
Registered electors		6,509				

The following candidates were elected: Ásgeir Bjarnason (B), 2,234 votes; Benedikt Sigurðsson Gröndal (A), 926 votes; Halldór Eggert Sigurðsson (B), 2,011 votes; Jón Árnason (D), 1,894 votes; and Sigurður Ágústsson (D), 2,117 votes.
