= Northwest (Althing constituency) =

Constituency of the Althing, the national legislature of Iceland

- Norðvestur
- Constituency for the Althing
- Location of Northwest within Iceland
- Municipality: List: Akranes; Árneshreppur; Blönduóssbær; Bolungarvík; Borgarbyggð; Dalabyggð; Eyja- og Miklaholtshreppur; Grundarfjörður; Húnaþing vestra; Hvalfjarðarsveit; Ísafjarðarbær; Kaldrananeshreppur; Reykhólahreppur; Skagabyggð; Skorradalshreppur; Snæfellsbær; Strandabyggð; Stykkishólmur; Súðavíkurhreppur; Sveitarfélagið Skagafjörður; Sveitarfélagið Skagaströnd; Vesturbyggð
- Region: List: Northwestern; Western; Westfjords
- Population: 31,881 (2024)
- Electorate: 22,351 (2024)
- Area: 31,477 km^{2} (2018)

Current Constituency
- Created: 2003
- Seats: List (Note: Excludes compensatory seats.): 6 (2024–present); 7 (2013–2024); 8 (2007–2013); 9 (2003–2007)
- Member of the Althing: List: Arna Lára Jónsdóttir (S); Eyjólfur Ármannsson (F); Ingibjörg Davíðsdóttir (M); Lilja Rafney Magnúsdóttir (F); María Rut Kristinsdóttir (C); Ólafur Adolfsson (D); Stefán Vagn Stefánsson (B)
- Created from: List: Northwestern; Western; Westfjords

Northwest (Icelandic: Norðvestur) is one of the six multi-member constituencies of the Althing, the national legislature of Iceland. The constituency was established in 2003 following the re-organisation of constituencies across Iceland when the Northwestern constituency (excluding Siglufjörður municipality which was merged into the Northeast constituency) was merged with the Western and Westfjords constituencies. Northwest consists of the regions of Northwestern, Western and Westfjords. The constituency currently elects six of the 63 members of the Althing using the open party-list proportional representation electoral system. At the 2024 parliamentary election it had 22,351 registered electors.

== History ==
In September 1997 Prime Minister Davíð Oddsson appointed a committee headed by Friðrik Klemenz Sophusson to review the division of constituencies in Iceland and the organisation of elections. The committee's report was published in October 1998 and recommended, amongst other things, that the number of constituencies be reduced and that they be more equal in population size. The Althing passed an amendment to the constitution in June 1999 which removed the reference to specific eight constituencies contained within Article 31 and instead simply stated that there would be six or seven constituencies and that the Althing would determine the boundaries between the constituencies. The amendment also required that if, following an election to Althing, the number of registered electors per seat (including compensatory seats) in any constituency is less than half of that in another constituency, the National Electoral Commission shall change the allocation of seats so as to reduce the imbalance.

Northwest was one of six constituencies (kjördæmi) established by the "Elections to the Althing Act no. 24/2000" (Lög um kosningar til Alþingis, nr. 24/2000) passed by the Althing in May 2000. The Act initially allocated ten seats to the constituency - nine constituency seats and one compensatory seat. The number of seats allocated to Northwest was reduced to nine (eight constituency and one compensatory) in May 2003, eight (seven constituency and one compensatory) in May 2013 and seven (six constituency and one compensatory) in October 2021.

== Electoral system ==
Northwest currently elects six of the 63 members of the Althing using the open party-list proportional representation electoral system. Constituency seats are allocated using the D'Hondt method. Compensatory seats (equalisation seats) are calculated based on the national vote and are allocated using the D'Hondt method at the constituency level. Only parties that reach the 5% national threshold compete for compensatory seats.

== Election results ==
=== Summary ===
Election	Left-Green V / U			Social Democrats S			People's F			Pirate P / Þ			Viðreisn C			Progressive B			Independence D			Centre M		
Election	Votes	%	Seats	Votes	%	Seats	Votes	%	Seats	Votes	%	Seats	Votes	%	Seats	Votes	%	Seats	Votes	%	Seats	Votes	%	Seats
2024	486	2.69%	0	2,871	15.88%	1	3,023	16.72%	1	322	1.78%	0	2,286	12.65%	1	2,406	13.31%	1	3,249	17.98%	1	2,669	14.77%	1
2021	1,978	11.47%	1	1,195	6.93%	0	1,510	8.75%	1	1,081	6.27%	0	1,063	6.16%	0	4,448	25.78%	3	3,897	22.59%	2	1,278	7.41%	0
2017	3,067	17.78%	1	1,681	9.74%	1	911	5.28%	0	1,169	6.78%	0	423	2.45%	0	3,177	18.42%	2	4,233	24.54%	2	2,456	14.24%	1
2016	3,032	18.09%	1	1,054	6.29%	0	412	2.46%	0	1,823	10.88%	1	1,044	6.23%	0	3,482	20.78%	2	4,951	29.54%	3			
2013	1,470	8.47%	0	2,122	12.23%	1				537	3.09%	0				6,104	35.17%	4	4,282	24.67%	2			
2009	4,018	22.82%	2	4,001	22.73%	2										3,967	22.53%	2	4,037	22.93%	2			
2007	2,855	15.95%	1	3,793	21.19%	2										3,362	18.79%	1	5,199	29.05%	3			
2003	1,987	10.62%	1	4,346	23.23%	2										4,057	21.68%	2	5,532	29.57%	3			

(Excludes compensatory seats.)

=== Detailed ===
==== 2020s ====
===== 2024 =====
Results of the 2024 parliamentary election held on 30 November 2024:

Party		Votes	%	Seats		
Party		Votes	%	Con.	Com.	Tot.
Independence Party	D	3,249	17.98%	1	0	1
People's Party	F	3,023	16.72%	1	1	2
Social Democratic Alliance	S	2,871	15.88%	1	0	1
Centre Party	M	2,669	14.77%	1	0	1
Progressive Party	B	2,406	13.31%	1	0	1
Viðreisn	C	2,286	12.65%	1	0	1
Socialist Party of Iceland	J	620	3.43%	0	0	0
Left-Green Movement	V	486	2.69%	0	0	0
Pirate Party	P	322	1.78%	0	0	0
Democratic Party	L	143	0.79%	0	0	0
Valid votes		18,075	100.00%	6	1	7
Blank votes		284	1.54%			
Rejected votes – other		39	0.21%			
Total polled		18,398	82.31%			
Registered electors		22,351				

The following candidates were elected:

- Constituency seats - Arna Lára Jónsdóttir (S), 2,859.67 votes; Eyjólfur Ármannsson (F), 3,019.75 votes; Ingibjörg Davíðsdóttir (M), 2,664.33 votes; María Rut Kristinsdóttir (C), 2,285.00 votes; Ólafur Adolfsson (D), 3,239.00 votes; and Stefán Vagn Stefánsson (B), 2,343.33 votes.
- Compensatory seats - Lilja Rafney Magnúsdóttir (F), 2,251.50 votes.

===== 2021 =====
Results of the 2021 parliamentary election held on 25 September 2021:

Party		Votes	%	Seats		
Party		Votes	%	Con.	Com.	Tot.
Progressive Party	B	4,448	25.78%	3	0	3
Independence Party	D	3,897	22.59%	2	0	2
Left-Green Movement	V	1,978	11.47%	1	0	1
People's Party	F	1,510	8.75%	1	0	1
Centre Party	M	1,278	7.41%	0	1	1
Social Democratic Alliance	S	1,195	6.93%	0	0	0
Pirate Party	P	1,081	6.27%	0	0	0
Viðreisn	C	1,063	6.16%	0	0	0
Socialist Party of Iceland	J	728	4.22%	0	0	0
Liberal Democratic Party	O	73	0.42%	0	0	0
Valid votes		17,251	100.00%	7	1	8
Blank votes		382	2.16%			
Rejected votes – other		35	0.20%			
Total polled		17,668	82.02%			
Registered electors		21,541				

The following candidates were elected:

- Constituency seats - Bjarni Jónsson (V), 1,941.33 votes; Eyjólfur Ármannsson (F), 1,507.67 votes; Halla Signý Kristjánsdóttir (B), 2,974.50 votes; Haraldur Benediktsson (D), 2,882.50 votes; Lilja Rannveig Sigurgeirsdóttir (B), 3,703.50 votes; Stefán Vagn Stefánsson (B), 4,393.00 votes; and Þórdís Kolbrún R. Gylfadóttir (D), 3,854.75 votes.
- Compensatory seats - Bergþór Ólason (M), 1,249.67 votes.

==== 2010s ====
===== 2017 =====
Results of the 2017 parliamentary election held on 28 October 2017:

Party		Votes	%	Seats		
Party		Votes	%	Con.	Com.	Tot.
Independence Party	D	4,233	24.54%	2	0	2
Progressive Party	B	3,177	18.42%	2	0	2
Left-Green Movement	V	3,067	17.78%	1	0	1
Centre Party	M	2,456	14.24%	1	1	2
Social Democratic Alliance	S	1,681	9.74%	1	0	1
Pirate Party	P	1,169	6.78%	0	0	0
People's Party	F	911	5.28%	0	0	0
Viðreisn	C	423	2.45%	0	0	0
Bright Future	A	135	0.78%	0	0	0
Valid votes		17,252	100.00%	7	1	8
Blank votes		582	3.26%			
Rejected votes – other		38	0.21%			
Total polled		17,872	83.04%			
Registered electors		21,521				

The following candidates were elected:

- Constituency seats - Ásmundur Einar Daðason (B), 3,078.75 votes; Bergþór Ólason (M), 2,442.00 votes; Guðjón Brjánsson (S), 1,637.00 votes; Halla Signý Kristjánsdóttir (B), 2,395.50 votes; Haraldur Benediktsson (D), 4,200.25 votes; Lilja Rafney Magnúsdóttir (V), 3,032.33 votes; and Þórdís Kolbrún R. Gylfadóttir (D), 3,174.00 votes.
- Compensatory seats - Sigurður Páll Jónsson (M), 1,842.50 votes.

===== 2016 =====
Results of the 2016 parliamentary election held on 29 October 2016:

Party		Votes	%	Seats		
Party		Votes	%	Con.	Com.	Tot.
Independence Party	D	4,951	29.54%	3	0	3
Progressive Party	B	3,482	20.78%	2	0	2
Left-Green Movement	V	3,032	18.09%	1	0	1
Pirate Party	P	1,823	10.88%	1	0	1
Social Democratic Alliance	S	1,054	6.29%	0	1	1
Viðreisn	C	1,044	6.23%	0	0	0
Bright Future	A	590	3.52%	0	0	0
People's Party	F	412	2.46%	0	0	0
Dawn	T	282	1.68%	0	0	0
Icelandic National Front	E	90	0.54%	0	0	0
Valid votes		16,760	100.00%	7	1	8
Blank votes		642	3.68%			
Rejected votes – other		42	0.24%			
Total polled		17,444	81.21%			
Registered electors		21,481				

The following candidates were elected:

- Constituency seats - Elsa Lára Arnardóttir (B), 2,691.75 votes; Eva Pandora Baldursdóttir (P), 1,814.00 votes; Gunnar Bragi Sveinsson (B), 3,118.50 votes; Haraldur Benediktsson (D), 4,919.00 votes; Lilja Rafney Magnúsdóttir (V), 2,987.33 votes; Teitur Björnsson (D), 3,298.17 votes; and Þórdís Kolbrún R. Gylfadóttir (D), 4,117.50 votes.
- Compensatory seats - Guðjón Brjánsson (S), 1,042.00 votes.

===== 2013 =====
Results of the 2013 parliamentary election held on 27 April 2013:

Party		Votes	%	Seats		
Party		Votes	%	Con.	Com.	Tot.
Progressive Party	B	6,104	35.17%	4	0	4
Independence Party	D	4,282	24.67%	2	0	2
Social Democratic Alliance	S	2,122	12.23%	1	0	1
Left-Green Movement	V	1,470	8.47%	0	1	1
Bright Future	A	792	4.56%	0	0	0
Rainbow	J	774	4.46%	0	0	0
Pirate Party	Þ	537	3.09%	0	0	0
Dawn	T	328	1.89%	0	0	0
Rural Party	M	326	1.88%	0	0	0
Iceland Democratic Party	L	251	1.45%	0	0	0
Right-Green People's Party	G	208	1.20%	0	0	0
Households Party	I	161	0.93%	0	0	0
Valid votes		17,355	100.00%	7	1	8
Blank votes		432	2.42%			
Rejected votes – other		38	0.21%			
Total polled		17,825	83.61%			
Registered electors		21,318				

The following candidates were elected:

- Constituency seats - Ásmundur Einar Daðason (B), 5,314.6 votes; Einar Kristinn Guðfinnsson (D), 4,186.5 votes; Elsa Lára Arnardóttir (B), 4,581.0 votes; Gunnar Bragi Sveinsson (B), 6,078.0 votes; Guðbjartur Hannesson (S), 2,109.0 votes; Haraldur Benediktsson (D), 3,203.3 votes; and Jóhanna María Sigmundsdóttir (B), 3,821.4 votes.
- Compensatory seats - Lilja Rafney Magnúsdóttir (V), 1,460.0 votes.

==== 2000s ====
===== 2009 =====
Results of the 2009 parliamentary election held on 25 April 2009:

Party		Votes	%	Seats		
Party		Votes	%	Con.	Com.	Tot.
Independence Party	D	4,037	22.93%	2	0	2
Left-Green Movement	V	4,018	22.82%	2	1	3
Social Democratic Alliance	S	4,001	22.73%	2	0	2
Progressive Party	B	3,967	22.53%	2	0	2
Liberal Party	F	929	5.28%	0	0	0
Citizens' Movement	O	587	3.33%	0	0	0
Democracy Movement	P	66	0.37%	0	0	0
Valid votes		17,605	100.00%	8	1	9
Blank votes		558	3.06%			
Rejected votes – other		51	0.28%			
Total polled		18,214	85.54%			
Registered electors		21,293				

The following candidates were elected:

- Constituency seats - Ásbjörn Óttarsson (D), 3,950.0 votes; Einar Kristinn Guðfinnsson (D), 2,908.0 votes; Gunnar Bragi Sveinsson (B), 3,942.2 votes; Guðbjartur Hannesson (S), 3,959.2 votes; Guðmundur Steingrímsson (B), 2,929.5 votes; Jón Bjarnason (V), 3,871.0 votes; Lilja Rafney Magnúsdóttir (V), 3,344.8 votes; and Ólína Þorvarðardóttir (S), 2,900.0 votes.
- Compensatory seats - Ásmundur Einar Daðason (V), 2,703.5 votes.

===== 2007 =====
Results of the 2007 parliamentary election held on 12 May 2007:

Party		Votes	%	Seats		
Party		Votes	%	Con.	Com.	Tot.
Independence Party	D	5,199	29.05%	3	0	3
Social Democratic Alliance	S	3,793	21.19%	2	0	2
Progressive Party	B	3,362	18.79%	1	0	1
Left-Green Movement	V	2,855	15.95%	1	0	1
Liberal Party	F	2,432	13.59%	1	1	2
Icelandic Movement – Living Country	I	255	1.42%	0	0	0
Valid votes		17,896	100.00%	8	1	9
Blank votes		254	1.40%			
Rejected votes – other		28	0.15%			
Total polled		18,178	86.05%			
Registered electors		21,126				

The following candidates were elected:

- Constituency seats - Einar Kristinn Guðfinnsson (D), 4,348.7 votes; Einar Oddur Kristjánsson (D), 3,379.8 votes; Guðbjartur Hannesson (S), 3,772.0 votes; Guðjón Arnar Kristjánsson (F), 2,426.0 votes; Jón Bjarnason (V), 2,807.7 votes; Karl V. Matthíasson (S), 2,776.7 votes; Magnús Stefánsson (B), 3,347.3 votes; and Sturla Böðvarsson (D), 4,903.7 votes.
- Compensatory seats - Kristinn H. Gunnarsson (F), 1,812.7 votes.

===== 2003 =====
Results of the 2003 parliamentary election held on 10 May 2003:

Party		Votes	%	Seats		
Party		Votes	%	Con.	Com.	Tot.
Independence Party	D	5,532	29.57%	3	0	3
Social Democratic Alliance	S	4,346	23.23%	2	0	2
Progressive Party	B	4,057	21.68%	2	0	2
Liberal Party	F	2,666	14.25%	1	1	2
Left-Green Movement	U	1,987	10.62%	1	0	1
New Force	N	122	0.65%	0	0	0
Valid votes		18,710	100.00%	9	1	10
Blank votes		245	1.29%			
Rejected votes – other		29	0.15%			
Total polled		18,984	89.35%			
Registered electors		21,247				

The following candidates were elected:

- Constituency seats - Anna Kristín Gunnarsdóttir (S), 3,223.7 votes; Einar Oddur Kristjánsson (D), 3,664.3 votes; Einar Kristinn Guðfinnsson (D), 4,646.2 votes; Guðjón Arnar Kristjánsson (F), 2,666.0 votes; Jóhann Ársælsson (S), 4,285.0 votes; Jón Bjarnason (U), 1,970.7 votes; Kristinn H. Gunnarsson (B), 2,928.0 votes; Magnús Stefánsson (B), 4,017.5 votes; and Sturla Böðvarsson (D), 5,078.7 votes.
- Compensatory seats - Sigurjón Þórðarson (F), 1,993.2 votes.
