= Gísli S. Einarsson =

Icelandic politician (born 1945)

Gísli S. Einarsson (GE)

Member of the Althing
- In office 1 September 1993 – 10 May 2003
- Preceded by: Eiður Guðnason
- Constituency: Western

Personal details
- Born: Gísli Sveinbjörn Einarsson; 12 December 1945 (age 80) Súðavík, Iceland
- Party: Social Democratic Alliance

Gísli Sveinbjörn Einarsson (born 12 December 1945) is an Icelandic politician and former member of the Althing. A member of the Social Democratic Alliance, he represented the Western constituency from September 1993 to May 2003.

Gísli was born on 12 December 1945 in Súðavík in Norður-Ísafjarðarsýsla county. He is the son of captain Einar Kristinn Gíslason and Elísabet Sveinbjörnsdóttir. In 1968 he received a diploma in mechanics from the vocational school in Akranes. He received a degree in engineering from the Western Polytechnic in Akranes in 1982.

Gísli joined the State Cement Factory in Akranes in 1963 as an apprentice mechanic and was a mechanic at the factory from 1964 to 1976. He did an apprenticeship in cement machine maintenance at Aalborg Portland in Denmark from 1976 to 1977 and was a mechanic at the factory from 1977 to 1979. Returning to Iceland, he was foreman at the State Cement Factory from 1979 to 1992 before working on computer-controlled machine maintenance at the factory from 1992 to 1993.

Gísli was a member of the municipal council in Akranes from 1986 to 1993 and served as its chairman (1990) and president (1991–1992). He was Mayor of Akranes from 2006 to 2010. He was a substitute member of the Althing in December 1991 (for Eiður Guðnason) and in November 2004 (for Jóhann Ársælsson). He was appointed to the Althing in September 1993 following the resignation of Eiður Guðnason.

Gísli married Ólöf Edda Guðmundsdóttir in 1964 and has two sons and a daughter.

Electoral history of Gísli S. Einarsson
Election	Constituency	Party	Votes	Result
1991 parliamentary	Western	Social Democratic Party	1,226	Not elected
1995 parliamentary	Western	Social Democratic Party	1,006	Elected
1999 parliamentary	Western	Social Democratic Alliance	2,191	Elected
2003 parliamentary	Northwest	Social Democratic Alliance	2,152.7	Not elected
