= Hvalfjarðarsveit =

Municipality in Vesturland, Iceland

Coordinates: 64.2959°N 21.9251°W

- Municipality
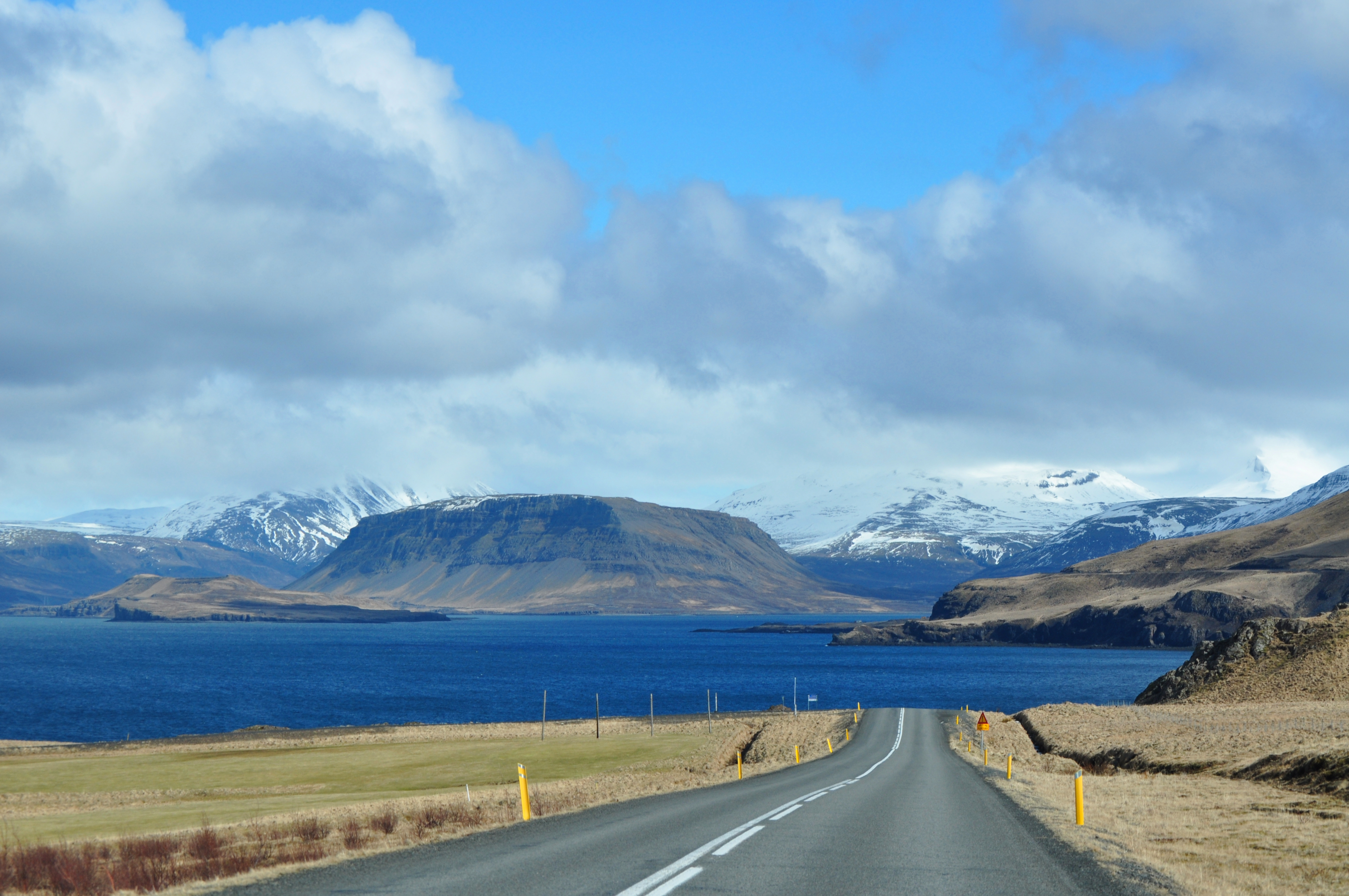
- View of Hvalfjörður

- Location of Hvalfjarðarsveit
- Interactive map of Hvalfjarðarsveit
- Location within Iceland
- Country: Iceland
- Region: Western Region
- Constituency: Northwest Constituency
- Established: 1 June 2006

Government
  - Mayor: Björgvin Helgason

Area
  - Total: 494 km^{2} (191 sq mi)

Population
  - Total: 612 (1 december 2,013)
  - Density: 1.24/km^{2} (3.2/sq mi)
- Postal code(s): 301
- Municipal number: 3511
- Website: www.hvalfjardarsveit.is

Hvalfjarðarsveit (Icelandic pronunciation: [ˈkʰvalˌfjarðarˌsveiːt]) is a municipality in Vesturland, Iceland. The municipality derives its name from the fjord Hvalfjörður, which forms its southern border.

The municipality formed on 1 June 2006, by the union of the former municipalities of Hvalfjarðarstrandarhreppur, Innri-Akraneshreppur, Leirár- og Melahreppur and Skilmannahreppur.

== Geography ==
The shores of Hvalfjörður, Faxaflói and Borgarfjörður form the region's southern and western borders. Hvalfjarðarsveit additionally borders the municipalities of Kjósarhreppur in the south, Akranes in the west, Borgarbyggð and Skorradalshreppur in the north, and Bláskógabyggð in the highlands to the east.

The largest settlement in the municipality is Melahverfi with a population of 111 in 2016.

Prominent mountains in Hvalfjarðarsveit (from west to east) include Akrafjall, Hafnarfjall, Skarðsheiði and Botnssúlur. Notable lakes (from west to east) include Eiðisvatn, Hólmavatn, Eyrarvatn, Glammastaðavatn, Geitabergsvatn and Hvalvatn. Iceland's second-tallest waterfall, Glymur, forms part of the river Botnsá that runs from Hvalvatn into the eastern bottom of Hvalfjörður.

Some 30 km (19 mi) of the Ring Road pass through Hvalfjarðarsveit, between the Hvalfjörður Tunnel in the south and Borgarnes in the north.

== Economy ==
Although the region is mostly rural and scarcely populated, Grundartangi industrial area contains a significant part of Iceland's heavy industry, and one of the country's largest ports. The port of Grundartangi opened in 1978, is operated by Faxaflóahafnir and owned by some of the neighbouring municipalities.

A ferrosilicon plant began operations in 1979 and is now the world's second largest producer, operated by Elkem, a subsidiary of China National Bluestar Group. An aluminium plant began operations in 1998, operated by Norðurál, a subsidiary of Century Aluminum. Silicor Materials is currently planning to construct a solar silicon plant at Grundartangi.

Pollution in the region caused by sulphur dioxide and fluorine emissions from the industrial area is controversial.

== Notable people ==
- Pétur Ottesen (1888–1968), politician and farmer
