= Guðjón =

Guðjón [ˈkvʏðˌjouːn] is an Icelandic given name.

- Guðjón S. Brjánsson (born 1955), Icelandic MP
- Guðjón Arnar Kristjánsson (1944–2018), Icelandic MP and chairman of the Liberal Party
- Guðjón Samúelsson (1887–1950), State Architect of Iceland
- Guðjón Valur Sigurðsson (born 1979), Icelandic handball player
- Guðjón Þórðarson (1955–2026), Icelandic football player and manager
