= Esja =

Icelandic mountain

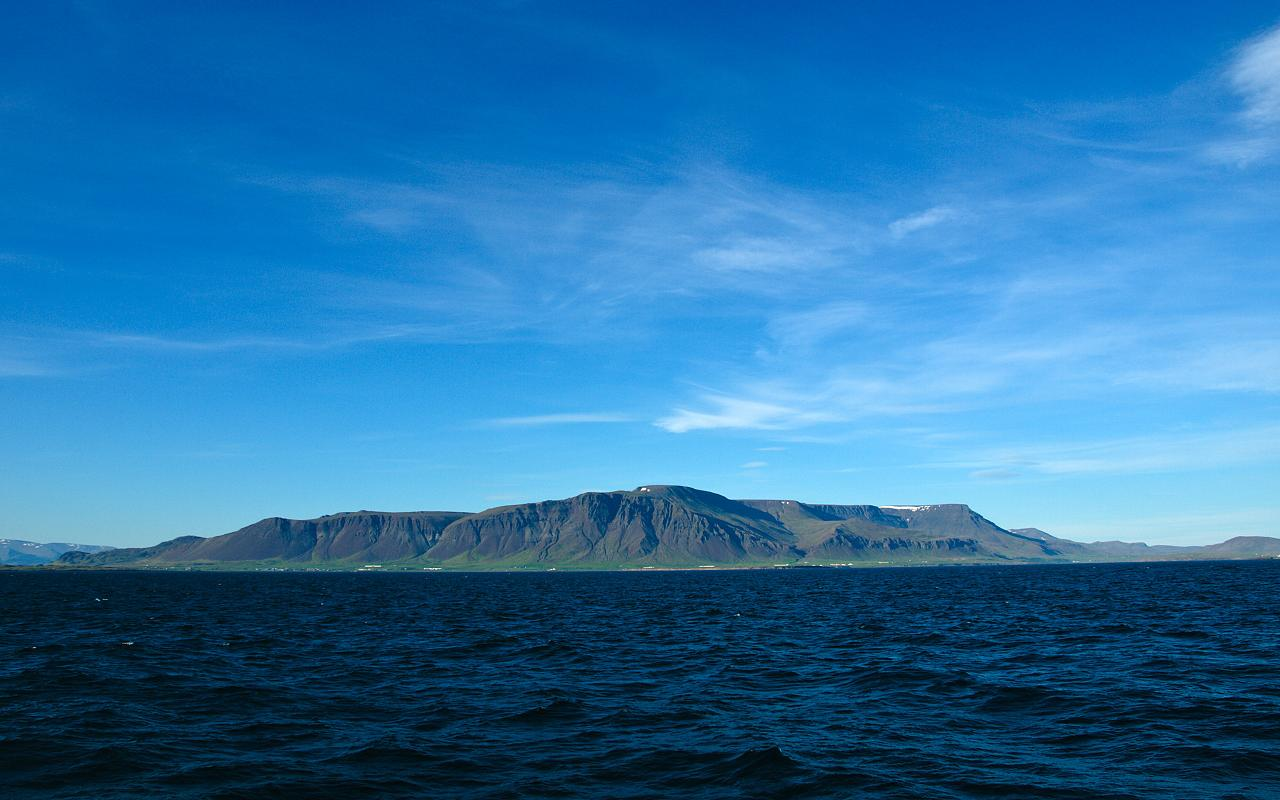
- The mountain range Esja

Highest point
- Elevation: 914 m (2,999 ft)
- Coordinates: 64°15′N 21°38′W

Geography
- Location within Iceland
- Location: 10 km north of Reykjavík, Iceland

Climbing
- Easiest route: hiking

Esja (Icelandic pronunciation: [ˈɛːsja]; often Esjan [ˈɛːsjan], with the feminine definite article) is a 914 m (2,999 ft) mountain situated in the south-west of Iceland, about ten kilometres north of Iceland's capital city Reykjavík.

Esja is not a single mountain, but a volcanic mountain range, made from basalt and tuff.

Esja is located in close proximity to Reykjavík

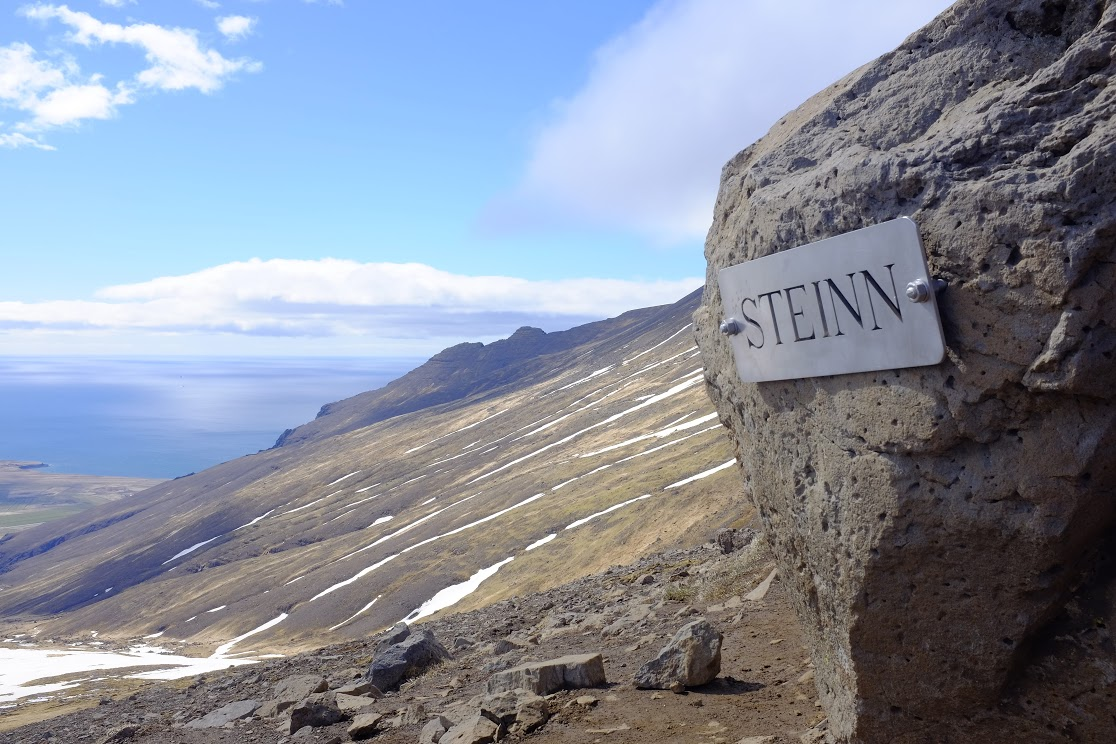
Steinn on Esja

== Etymology ==
The name is likely related to an archaic word, esja, meaning rock flake or carving stone.

In the Kjalnesinga saga, there is a rich widow among Irish settlers named Esja, but it is likely that the woman's name is derived from the mountain and not vice versa.

Esja can be used as a given name in Iceland.

== Formation ==
Esja was built up at the end of the Pleistocene with the beginning of the Ice Age. During the warm periods lava flowed, and in the cold periods ridges of tuff were built up under the glacier. The western part of the mountain range is the oldest (about 3.2 million years) and the eastern part is the youngest (about 1.8 million years). The movements of the plate boundaries cutting diagonally through Iceland are continually pushing the strata to the west and away from the active volcanic zone. Intrusions, i.e. large magma channels coming from the old central volcanoes at Kjalarnes and Stardalur [ˈstarˌtaːlʏr̥], found entrances into the strata. The result was a series of large lava fields, one above the other, which the Ice Age glacier ground down. It left only the highest summits, like the mountain ranges of Esja or Akrafjall [ˈaːkraˌfjatl̥].

== Physical features ==
The easternmost summits of the mountain range, called Móskarðshnúkar [ˈmouːˌskarðsˌn̥uːkʏr̥], are of an unusually light colour. An Icelandic writer in the 19th century, so goes the story, hoped to see the sun there after a long period of rain. But when he looked closer, it was only the mountaintops with their colours. In reality, it is the rhyolite stone, often to be found in Icelandic nature near old (and also active) central volcanoes.

== Hiking and climbing ==
Within easy reach of the capital, Esja is a very popular recreation area for hikers and climbers. The best known hiking paths lead to the summits Þverfellshorn [ˈθvɛrˌfɛlsˌhɔ(r)tn̥] (780 m) and Kerhólakambur [ˈcʰɛrˌhouːlaˌkʰampʏr̥] (851 m). Þverfellshorn is also easily accessible by public transport.

The path is divided into sections, marked with signs along the way. Each sign gives an indication of the difficulty of the path ahead with a grade system ranging from 1 boot (easy) to 3 boots (challenging). At the third sign, experienced climbers can choose to climb directly to the peak, instead of following the path which goes off to the right. After approximately 6.6 kilometers of walking and 597 meters altitude gain is a big rock called Steinn [ˈsteitn̥]. It is here that most inexperienced climbers choose to go down again, as the path becomes increasingly difficult from there.

The highest point, at 914 m, is called Hábunga [ˈhauːˌpuŋka]. From Þverfellshorn, reaching Hábunga requires another three-kilometer trek northeast, across a rocky plateau with no directional signs or clear path. As of June 2024, Hábunga was marked only by a large cairn with a wooden stick at the top.

There is danger of avalanches in wintertime. The last fatality from an avalanche was in 2020.

The last fatality on Esjan was in 2025 when a young man unfortunately fell to his death.

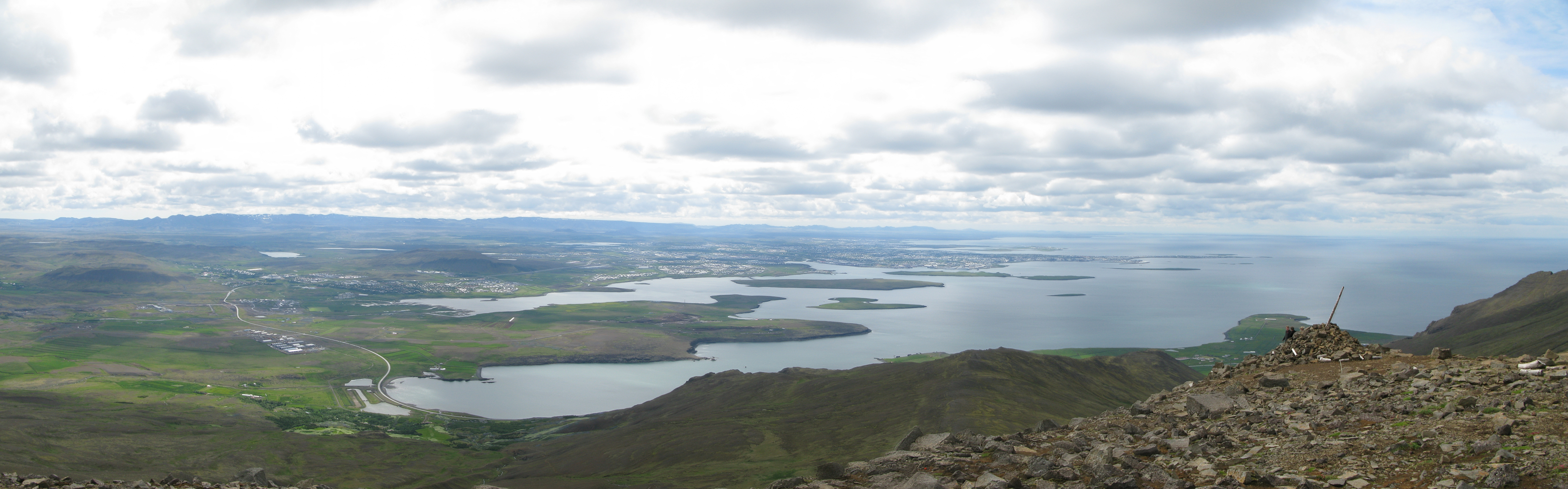
View from the Þverfellshorn peak towards Mosfellsbær and Reykjavík
