= Arna Lára Jónsdóttir =

Icelandic politician (born 1976)

Arna Lára Jónsdóttir (ArnaJ)
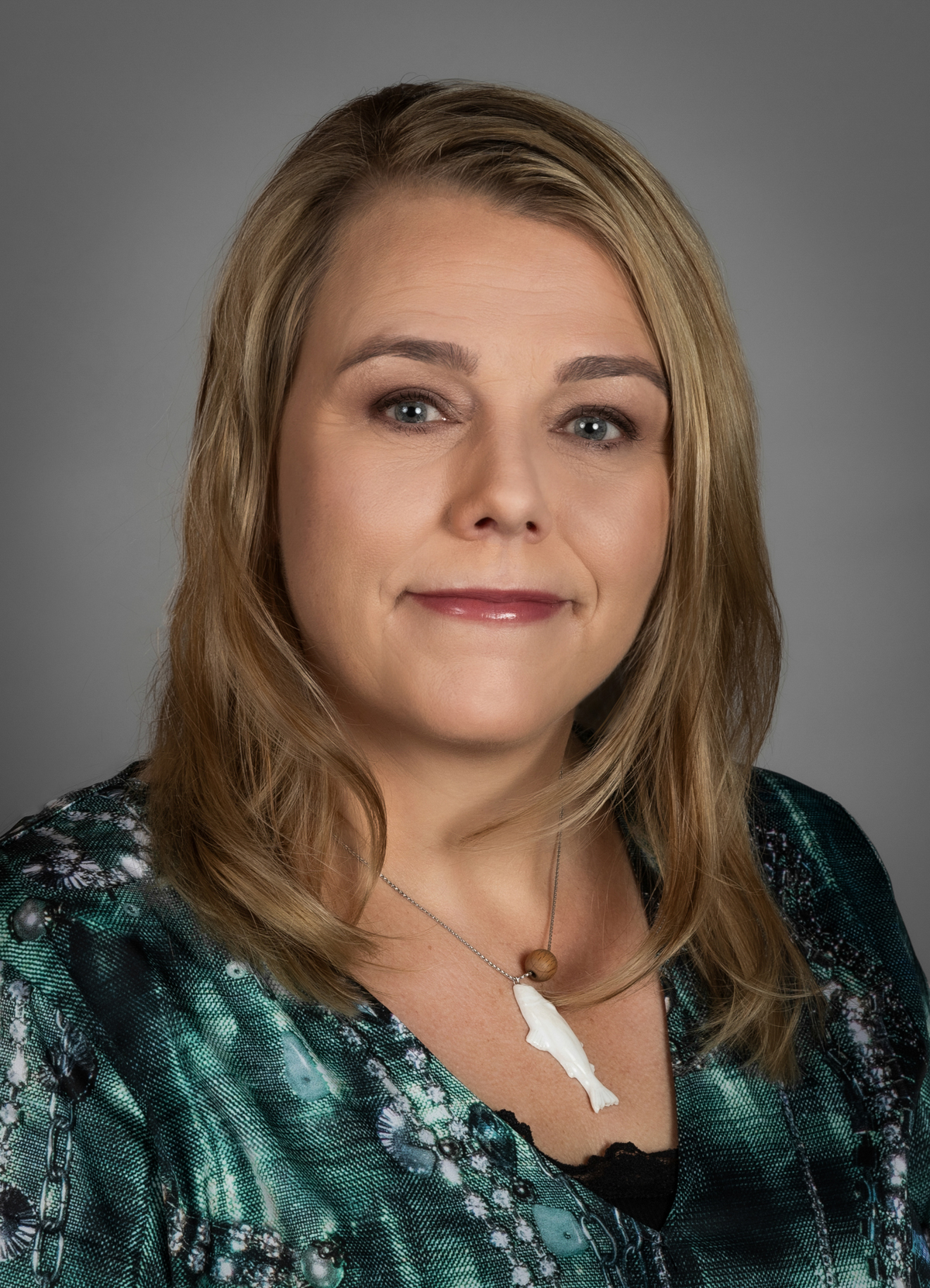

Member of the Althing
- Incumbent
- Assumed office 30 November 2024
- Constituency: Northwest

Mayor of Ísafjarðarbær
- In office 2 June 2022 – 7 January 2025
- Preceded by: Birgir Gunnarsson
- Succeeded by: Sigríður Júlía Brynleifsdóttir

Personal details
- Born: 30 May 1976 (age 49) Ísafjörður, Iceland
- Party: Social Democratic Alliance

Arna Lára Jónsdóttir (born 30 May 1976) is an Icelandic politician and member of the Althing. A member of the Social Democratic Alliance, she has represented the Northwest constituency since November 2024.

Arna was born on 30 May 1976 in Ísafjörður. She has a Bachelor of Science degree in political science and a master's degree in international business and marketing. She has worked in the innovation and business development sector as well as on regional development projects for the Westfjords Economic Development Association (Atvinnuþróunarfélagi Vestfjarða) and the Icelandic Innovation Center.

Arna was elected to the municipal council in Ísafjarðarbær at the 2006 municipal elections as a candidate for the Í List, an electoral alliance between the Social Democratic Alliance (Samfylkingin), Left-Green Movement and Liberal Party. She has been mayor of Ísafjarðarbær since June 2022. She was elected secretary of Samfylkingin in October 2022, defeating incumbent Alexandra Ýr van Erven. She has been on the board of the Municipal Loan Fund (Lánasjóðs sveitarfélaga) and the Hvetjandi investment company.

Arna was a substitute member of the Althing several times: in February 2010 and from October 2012 to November 2012 for Ólína Þorvarðardóttir; in January 2012 for Guðbjartur Hannesson; and in September 2018, May 2019, October 2019 and from January 2020 to February 2020 for Guðjón S. Brjánsson. She was elected to the Althing at the 2024 parliamentary election. Sigríður Júlía Brynleifsdóttir is expected to replace Arna as Mayor of Ísafjarðarbær in January 2025.

Arna and her partner Ingi Björn Guðnason have two daughters and a son.

Electoral history of Arna Lára Jónsdóttir
Election	Constituency	Party	Votes	Result
2009 parliamentary	Northwest	Social Democratic Alliance	2,038.50	Not elected
2017 parliamentary	Northwest	Social Democratic Alliance	1,133.67	Not elected
2024 parliamentary	Northwest	Social Democratic Alliance	2,859.67	Elected
