= Hafsteinsson =

Hafsteinsson is an Icelandic patronymic surname. Notable people with the surname include:

- Daníel Hafsteinsson (born 1999), Icelandic footballer
- Magnús Þór Hafsteinsson (1964–2025), Icelandic politician
- Vésteinn Hafsteinsson (born 1960), Icelandic discus thrower
- Viðar Örn Hafsteinsson (born 1985), Icelandic basketball player and coach
