= Benediktsson =

Benediktsson is a surname of Icelandic origin, meaning son of Benedikt. In Icelandic names, the name is not strictly a surname, but a patronymic. The name refers to:

- Bjarni Benediktsson (born 1908) (1908–1970), Icelandic politician; Prime Minister of Iceland 1963–70
- Bjarni Benediktsson (born 1970), Icelandic politician, Prime Minister of Iceland 2017 and 2024 to present, grand-nephew of the earlier prime minister
- Einar Benediktsson (1864–1940), Icelandic lawyer, poet, and translator
- Einar Örn Benediktsson (born 1962), Icelandic pop singer and trumpet player
- Ellen Benediktson (born 1995), Swedish electronic music singer and songwriter
- Haraldur Benediktsson (born 1966), Icelandic politician

== See also ==
- Victoria Benedictsson (1850–1888), Swedish author who wrote under the pen name Ernst Ahlgren
