= 2007 Icelandic parliamentary election =

- 12 May 2007
- All 63 seats in the Althing
- Turnout: 83.62%
Party	Leader	Vote %	Seats	+/–
Independence	Geir Haarde	36.64	25	+3
Social Democratic	Ingibjörg Sólrún Gísladóttir	26.76	18	−2
Left-Green	Steingrímur J. Sigfússon	14.35	9	+4
Progressive	Jón Sigurðsson	11.72	7	−5
Liberal	Guðjón Arnar Kristjánsson	7.26	4	0
This lists parties that won seats. See the complete results below.
Results by constituency
Prime Minister before	Prime Minister after election
Geir Haarde; Independence	Geir Haarde; Independence

Parliamentary elections were held in Iceland on 12 May 2007. The Independence Party remained the largest party in the Althing, winning 25 of the 63 seats. Following the elections, a coalition government was formed by the Independence Party and the Social Democratic Alliance, with Geir Haarde continuing as Prime Minister.

== Background ==
Six parties participated in the elections: the two parties of the then government coalition, the right wing Independence Party and the centrist Progressive Party, and the opposition parties in the Alþingi, the Social Democratic Alliance, the Left-Green Movement and the Liberal Party; one new party, the environmentalist Icelandic Movement – Living Country also participated in the elections. The Fighting Union, an advocacy party for disabled and senior citizens' rights, failed to present lists of candidates in due time in five out of six constituencies, and therefore decided to withdraw from the elections.

== Constituencies ==
There are six constituencies in Iceland. According to the Law on Parliamentary Elections (nr.24/2000), each constituency is granted 9 seats decided by proportional voting in the constituency, and finally 9 special Leveling seats (either 1 or 2 per constituency, depending on their population size) will work to adjust the result, so that proportionality is also ensured according to the overall number of party votes at the national level. The number of constituency seats shall however be adjusted ahead of the next election, if the fraction of residents with suffrage per available seat in the constituency became more than twice as big in the latest election, when comparing the constituency with the highest fraction against the one with the lowest fraction. In that case a constituency seat shall travel from the constituency with the lowest figure to the one with the highest figure, until the result of the equation comply with the rule. However, the total number of seats (including leveling seats) must never become less than six in any constituency. The box below display the number of available seats in each constituency at the 2007 parliamentary election.

Constituency	Constituency seats	Leveling seats	Total seats
Reykjavik North	9	2	11
Reykjavik South	9	2	11
Southwest	10	2	12
Northwest	8	1	9
Northeast	9	1	10
South	9	1	10
Total	54	9	63

=== Method for apportionment of constituency seats ===
The available constituency seats are first distributed to each party according to the D'Hondt method, so that proportional representation is ensured within each of the constituencies. The next step is to apportion these party distributed seats to the candidates within the party having the highest "vote score", after counting both direct candidate votes and their share of party votes in the constituency. In Iceland the "candidate vote system" is that, for each constituency, each party provides a pre-ranked list of candidates beneath each party name (listed according to the preferred order decided by the party), but where the voters voting for the party can alter this pre-ranked order by renumbering the individual candidates and/or crossing out those candidates they do not like, so that such candidates will not get a share of the voter's "personal vote" for the party.

As a restriction on the possibility of re-ranking candidates, it is however only possible to alter the first several candidates on the list. The borderline for alterations is drawn for the first three candidates if the party only win one of the total seats in the constituency, or if more than one seat is won the borderline shall be drawn at the pre-ranked number equal to two times the total number of seats being won by the party in the constituency. So if a party has won two seats in a constituency, then the voter is only allowed to re-rank the top four ranked candidates on the list, with any rank altering by voters below this line simply being ignored when subsequently calculating the candidate vote shares within each party. Final calculation of the candidate vote shares is always done according to the Borda method, where all candidates above the previously described borderline in the ranking are granted voting fraction values according to the voters noted rank. If the number of considered candidates consist of four (as in the given example), then the first ranked candidate is assigned a value of 1 (a so-called full personal vote), the next one get the value 0.75 (1/4 less), followed likewise by 0.50 and 0.25 respectively for the two last candidates. If the number of considered candidates instead had been six (due to winning 3 seats), then the first ranked candidate in a similar way would be assigned a value of 1 (a so-called full personal vote), with the following five candidates receiving respectively 5/6, 4/6, 3/6, 2/6 and 1/6. As mentioned above, crossed out names will always be allocated a 0.00 value. The accumulated total score of the candidates voting fractions, will be used in determining which candidates receive the seats won by their party. Note that candidate vote scores are not directly comparable to candidates from other parties, as how many seats are being won in a constituency by a particular party will effect how their candidates receive voting fractions (like in the above examples, where a candidate ranked number four for a party winning two seats would receive a voting fraction of 0.25, compared to 0.50 for an equally ranked candidate belonging to a party winning 3 seats)

=== Method for apportionment of leveling seats ===
After the initial apportionment of constituency seats, all the parties that exceed the election threshold of 5% nationally will also qualify to potentially be granted the extra leveling seats, which seek to adjust the result towards seat proportionality at the national level.

The calculation procedure for the distribution of leveling seats is, first, for each party having exceeded the national threshold of 5%, to calculate the ratio of its total number of votes at the national level divided by the sum of one extra seat added to the number of seats the party have so far won. The first leveling seat will go to the party with the highest ratio of votes per seat. The same calculation process is then repeated, until all 9 leveling seats have been allocated to specific parties. A party's "votes per seat" ratio will change during this calculation process, after each additional leveling seat being won. The second and final step is for each party being granted a leveling seat to pin point, across all constituencies, which of its runner-up candidates (candidates that came short of winning direct election through a constituency seat) should then win this additional seat. This selection is made by first identifying the constituency having the strongest "relative constituency vote shares for this additional seat of the party", which is decided by another proportional calculation, where the "relative vote share for the party list in each constituency", is divided with the sum of "one extra seat added to the number of already won constituency seats by the party list in the constituency". When this strongest constituency has been identified, the leveling seat will be automatically granted to the highest placed unelected runner-up candidate on the party list in this constituency, who among the remaining candidates have the highest personal vote score (the same figure as the one used when ranking candidates for constituency seats).

The above described method is used for apportionment of all the party allocated leveling seats. Note that when selecting which of a party's constituencies shall receive its apportioned leveling seat, this identification may only happen in exactly the same numerical order as the leveling seats were calculated at the party level. This is important because the number of available leveling seats are limited per constituency, meaning that the last calculated leveling seats in all circumstances can never be granted to candidates who belong to constituencies where the available leveling seats already were granted to other parties.

== Results ==
Party	Votes	%	+/–	Seats	+/–
Independence Party	66,754	36.64	+2.96	25	+3
Social Democratic Alliance	48,743	26.76	–4.19	18	–2
Left-Green Movement	26,136	14.35	+5.55	9	+4
Progressive Party	21,350	11.72	–6.01	7	–5
Liberal Party	13,233	7.26	–0.12	4	0
Icelandic Movement – Living Country	5,953	3.27	New	0	New
Total	182,169	100.00	–	63	0
Valid votes	182,169	98.43			
Invalid/blank votes	2,902	1.57			
Total votes	185,071	100.00			
Registered voters/turnout	221,330	83.62			
Source: Nohlen & Stöver

=== By constituency ===
Constituency	Progressive	Liberal	Icelandic Movement	Social Democratic	Independence	Left-Green
Northeast	24.57%	5.91%	1.19%	20.77%	27.99%	19.56%
Northwest	18.79%	13.59%	1.42%	21.19%	29.05%	15.95%
Reykjavik North	6.24%	6.32%	4.87%	29.24%	36.41%	16.92%
Reykjavik South	5.90%	6.76%	4.76%	29.00%	39.23%	14.35%
South	18.72%	6.99%	1.72%	26.76%	35.97%	9.85%
Southwest	7.18%	6.74%	3.53%	28.37%	42.64%	11.55%
Source: Constituency Level Election Archive

== Aftermath ==
The then governing parties won a razor-thin majority, 32 seats against the opposition's 31. This was caused by considerable losses for the Progressive Party, which had the worst election in its more than 90-year history. Major outcomes of the elections were also the considerable strengthening of the Left-Green Movement, was the election's big winner, and the failure of Iceland's Movement – Living Land to clear the election threshold and enter the parliament, though it got 3.3% of the votes. After five days of speculation, it was decided on 17 May that the government would resign and the 12-year-long coalition between Independence Party and Progressive would end. Later the same day, the leaders of the Independence Party and of the largest opposition party, the Social Democratic Alliance, Geir H. Haarde, the outgoing Prime Minister, and Ingibjörg Sólrún Gísladóttir, former mayor of Reykjavík, decided to try to form a new majority coalition. Haarde formally resigned on 18 May on behalf of his outgoing government. Simultaneously, he was assigned by the President of Iceland, Ólafur Ragnar Grímsson, the mandate to form a new majority coalition. The coalition meetings between the Independence Party and the Alliance were held in Reykjavík and at Þingvellir, where Alþingi was established in the year of 930. On 22 May the two parties reached an agreement, and the new government took over on 24 May. The ministers are as follows:

- Geir Haarde, Prime Minister (IP)
- Ingibjörg Sólrún Gísladóttir, Minister of Foreign Affairs (SDA)
- Árni Mathiesen, Minister of Finance (IP)
- Einar Kristinn Guðfinnsson, Minister of Fisheries and Agriculture (IP)
- Össur Skarphéðinsson, Minister of Industries (SDA)
- Björgvin G. Sigurðsson, Minister of Commerce (SDA)
- Björn Bjarnason, Minister of Justice (IP)
- Þorgerður Katrín Gunnarsdóttir, Minister of Education (IP)
- Jóhanna Sigurðardóttir, Minister of Social Affairs (SDA)
- Guðlaugur Þór Þórðarson, Minister of Health (IP)
- Kristján L. Möller, Minister of Transportation (SDA)
- Þórunn Sveinbjarnardóttir, Minister of Environment (SDA)

The government enjoyed a vast majority on Alþingi, with 43 out of 63 members supporting it. In the government's manifesto, it stated that it would focus on children, the elderly and the environment, as well as aiming to lower taxes, raise benefits and invest heavily in education and transportation. The Social Democratic Alliance was more environmentalist and pro-EU and opposed the war in Iraq and Iceland's participation in the "Coalition of the Willing". Nevertheless, no action was announced to stop or reconsider the building of large-scale industrial complexes such as aluminium smelters and the development of new power plants, especially hydropower stations, or the country's participation in the war. A commission, though, to weigh the pros and cons of European Union membership was set up, but without a clear mandate.

On 23 May the chairman of the Progressive Party, Jón Sigurðsson, the outgoing Minister of Industries and Commerce, announced his resignation, due to poor results in the election. The vice chairman, Guðni Ágústsson, the outgoing Minister of Agriculture, took over the post.
