= Sigurlín Margrét Sigurðardóttir =

Icelandic politician

Sigurlín Margrét Sigurðardóttir (born 23 April 1964) is the first deaf person to be a member of Alþingi (Iceland's parliament), on 1 October 2003 as a then-member of the Icelandic Liberal Party, serving for three months as a replacement for Gunnar Örlygsson while he served a sentence for fishery violations.

In 2007 she left the Liberal Party along with several other members to join the Icelandic Movement – Living Country.

== Website ==
- Sigurlín's Blog (Icelandic)
