= Stefán Stefánsson =

Stefán Stefánsson may refer to:

- Stefán Jóhann Stefánsson (1894–1980), Icelandic politician; prime minister of Iceland 1947–1949
- Stefán Karl Stefánsson (1975–2018), Icelandic film and stage actor
- Stefán Vagn Stefánsson (born 1972), Icelandic politician
