= Halla Signý Kristjánsdóttir =

Icelandic politician (born 1964)

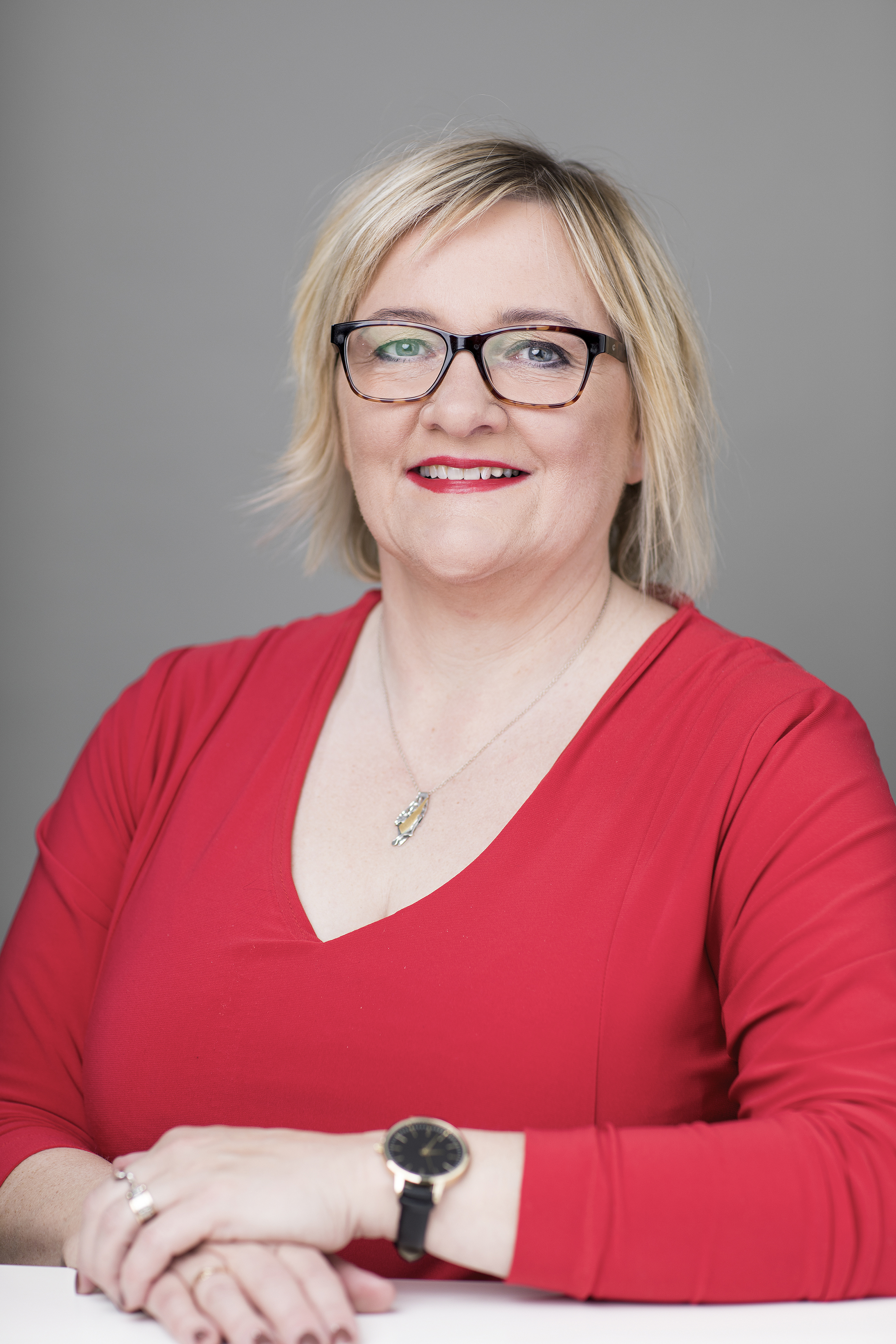

Personal details
- Born: 1 May 1964 (age 62) Flateyri, Iceland
- Party: Progressive Party
- Spouse: Sigurður G. Sverrisson
- Parent(s): Kristján Guðmundsson (1918-1988); Árilía Jóhannesdóttir (1923-2014)
- Education: Bifröst University (B.S.)

Halla Signý Kristjánsdóttir (born 1 May 1964) is an Icelandic politician who is a member of the Althing (Iceland's parliament) for the Northwest Constituency since 2017.
