= Jóhann Ársælsson =

Icelandic politician (born 1943)

Jóhann Ársælsson (JÁ)

Member of the Althing
- In office 10 May 2003 – 11 May 2007
- Constituency: Northwest
- In office 8 May 1999 – 10 May 2003
- Constituency: Western
- In office 13 May 1991 – 8 April 1995
- Constituency: Western

Personal details
- Born: 7 December 1943 (age 82) Ólafsvík, Iceland
- Party: Social Democratic Alliance

Jóhann Ársælsson (born 7 December 1943) is an Icelandic politician and former member of the Althing. A member of the Social Democratic Alliance, he represented the Western constituency from May 1991 to April 1995 and from May 1999 to May 2003, and the Northwest constituency from May 2003 to May 2007.

Jóhann was born on 7 December 1943 in Ólafsvík. He is the son of lighthouse keeper Ársæll Jónsson and Anna Sigrún Jóhannsdóttir. He studied shipbuilding from 1961 and 1965 and qualified as a master shipbuilder. He was managing director of the Knarrar boat yard in Akranes from 1974 to 1991 and from 1995 to 1999. He was on the board of the State Cement Factory (1977–1981), HAB (1979–1987), State Herring Factory (1992–1993) and Landsbankinn (1995–1998).

Jóhann was a member of the municipal council in Akranes from 1974 to 1982 and from 1986 to 1990. He was on the central board of the People's Alliance from 1987. He was a substitute member of the Althing in October 1984 for Skúli Alexandersson. He was elected to the Althing at the 1991 parliamentary election. He was deputy chairman of social democratic parliamentary group from August 1992 to April 1995 and from June 1999 to May 2003. Jóhann announced in September 2006 that he would not be seeking re-election. In May 2012 he was appointed chairman of the Housing Financing Fund (ÍLS) by Minister of Welfare Guðbjartur Hannesson.

Jóhann married Guðbjörg Róbertsdóttir in 1966 and has three sons and a daughter.

Electoral history of Jóhann Ársælsson
Election	Constituency	Party	Votes	Result
1983 parliamentary	Western	People's Alliance	1,074	Not elected
1991 parliamentary	Western	People's Alliance	1,513	Elected
1995 parliamentary	Western	People's Alliance		Not elected
1999 parliamentary	Western	Social Democratic Alliance	2,207	Elected
2003 parliamentary	Northwest	Social Democratic Alliance	4,285.0	Elected
