= Elsa Lára Arnardóttir =

Icelandic politician

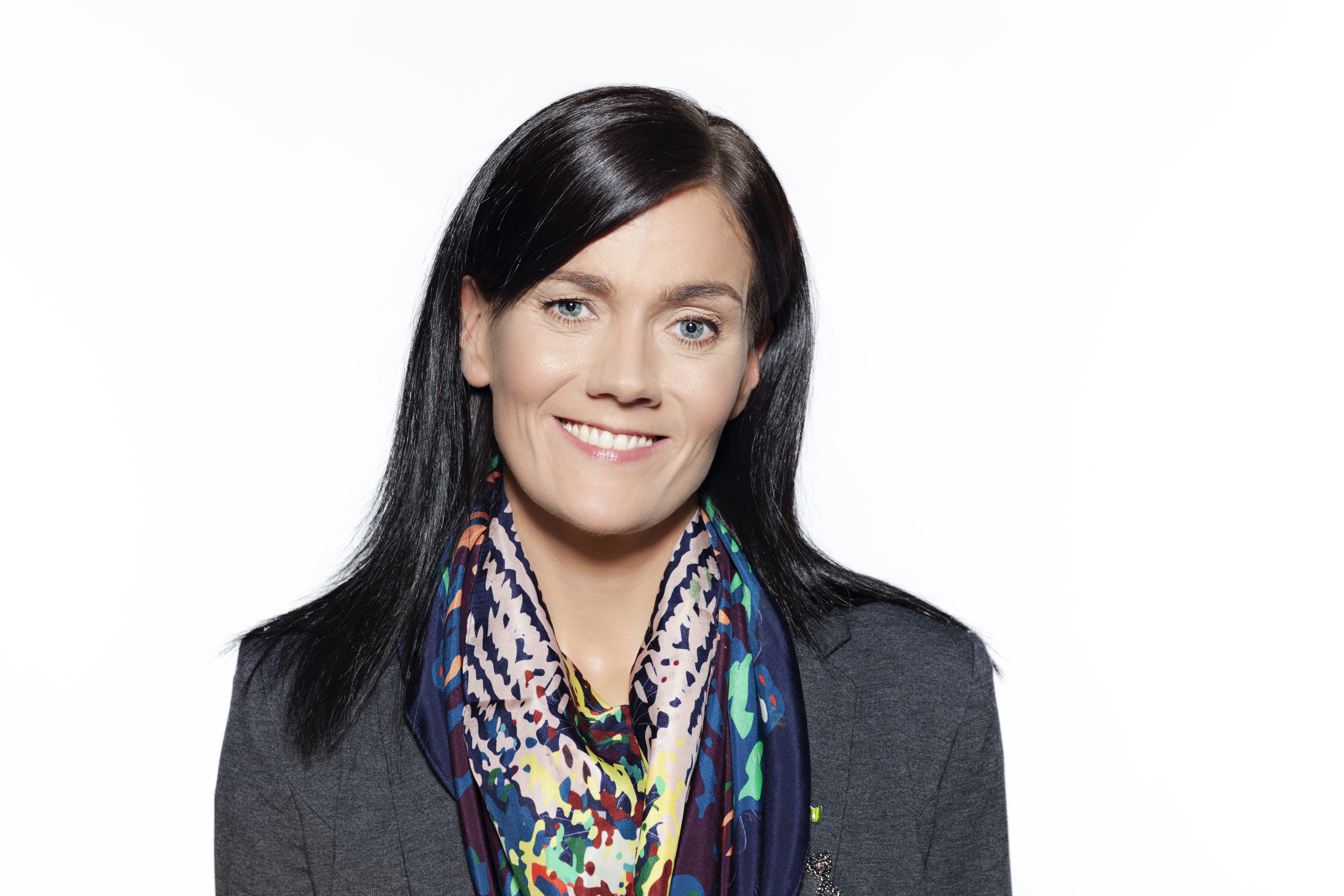
- Elsa Lára Arnardóttir

Deputy Member of the Althing
- Incumbent
- Assumed office 2022
- Constituency: Northwest

Member of the Althing
- In office 2013–2017
- Constituency: Northwest

Personal details
- Born: December 30, 1975 (age 50) Reykjavík, Iceland
- Party: Progressive Party

Elsa Lára Arnardóttir (born 30 December 1975) is an Icelandic politician for the Progressive Party. From 2013 to 2017, she served as a member of the Althing for the Northwest constituency.
