= Pétur Ottesen =

Icelandic politician

Pétur Ottesen (2 August 1888 – 16 December 1968) was an Icelandic politician and member of the Althing from 1916 to 1959. He lived on Ytri-Holmur in Hvalfjardarsveit where he was a farmer. His wife's name was Petrína Helga Jónsdóttir.
