= María Rut Kristinsdóttir =

Icelandic politician

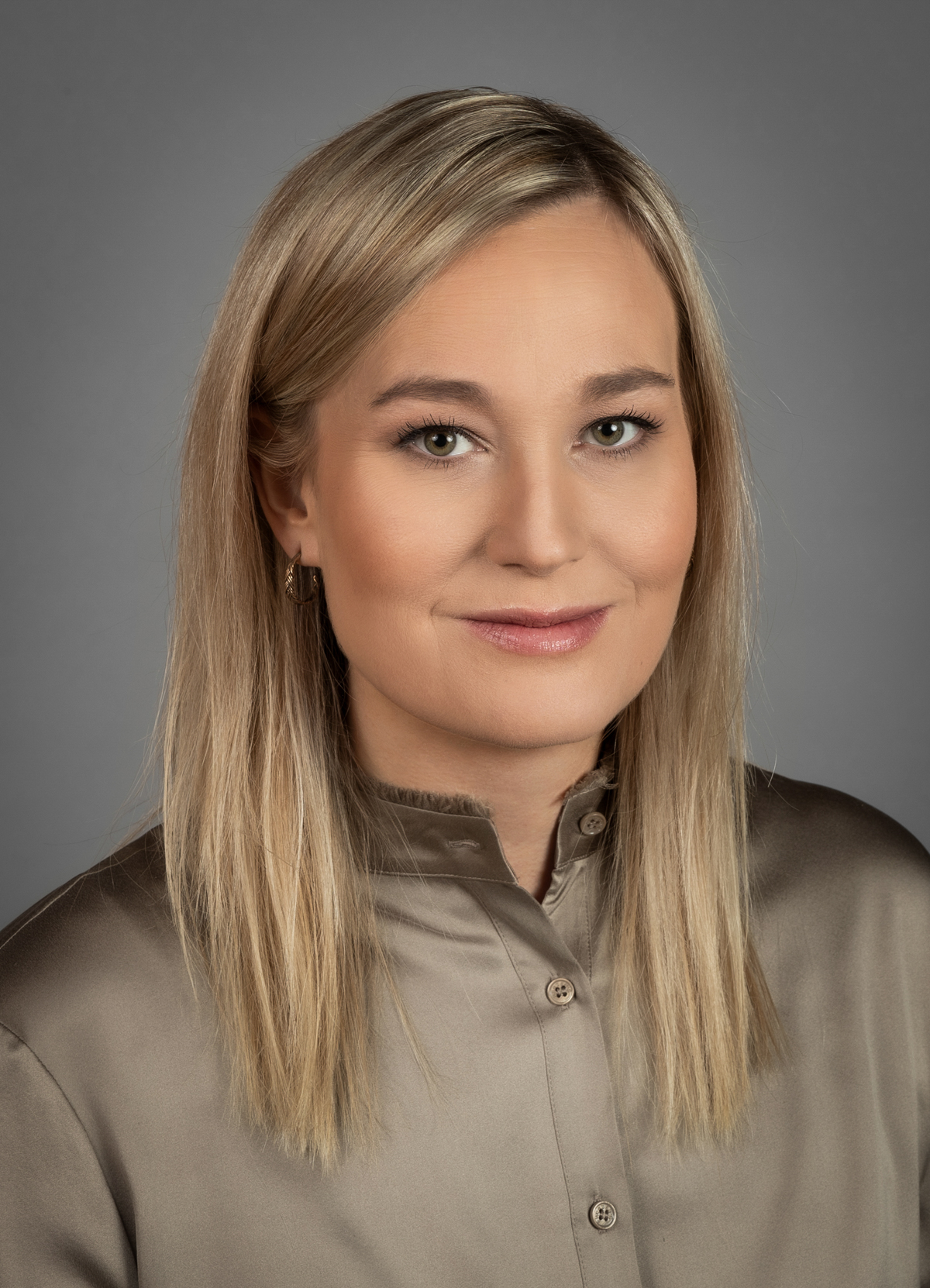

Member of the Althing
- Incumbent
- Assumed office 2024
- Constituency: Northwest

Personal details
- Party: Viðreisn

María Rut Kristinsdóttir is an Icelandic politician from the Viðreisn party. In the 2024 Icelandic parliamentary election she was elected to the Althing.

She was publicity manager for UN Women in Iceland.

== Personal life ==
She is the mother of a son.

== See also ==
- List of members of the Althing, 2024–2028
