= Ólafur Adolfsson =

Icelandic politician

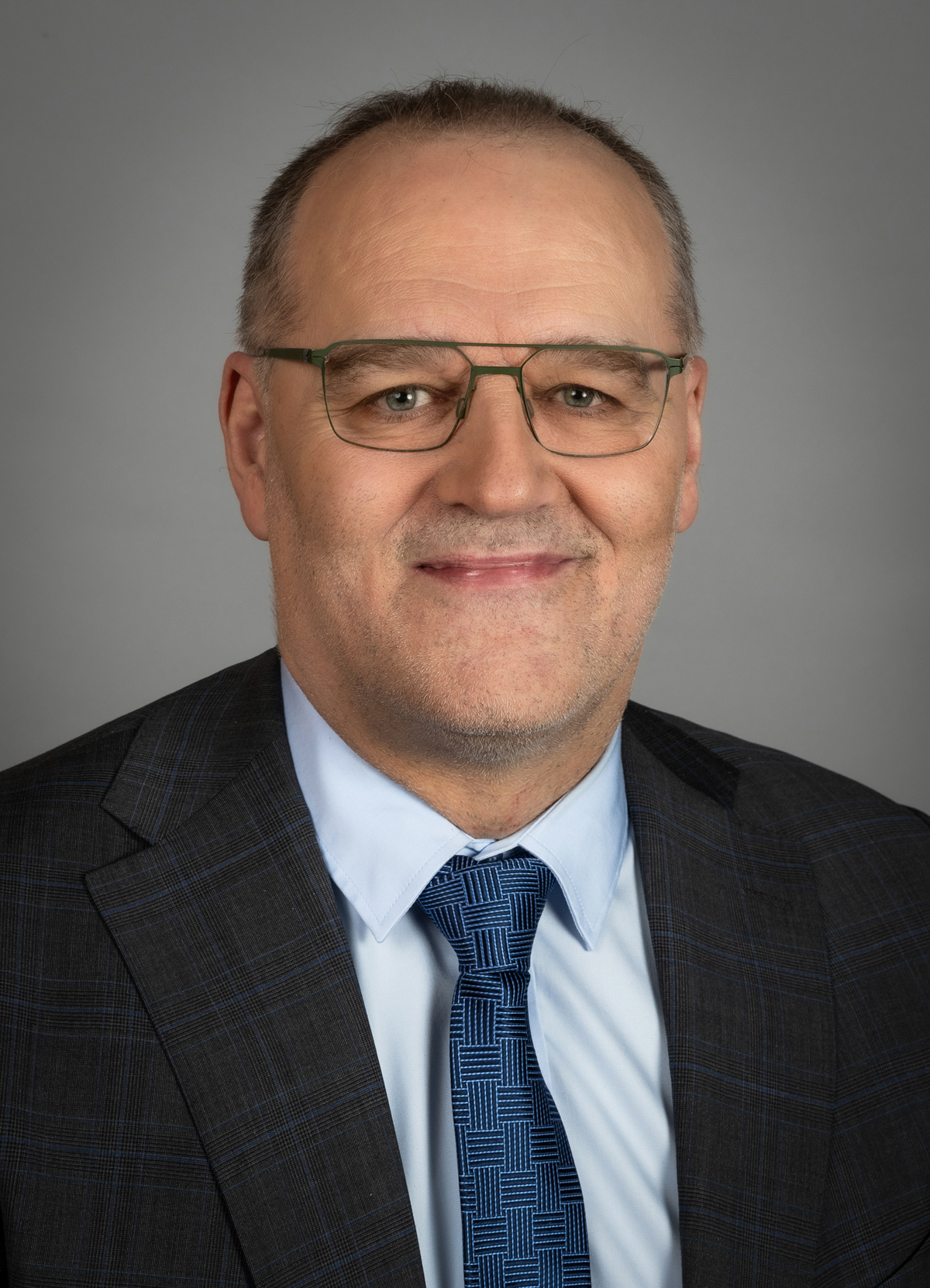

Member of the Althing
- Incumbent
- Assumed office 2024
- Constituency: Northwest

Personal details
- Party: Independence
- Education: University of Iceland

Ólafur Adolfsson is an Icelandic politician from the Independence Party. In the 2024 Icelandic parliamentary election he was elected to the Althing.

In 2009, he founded the Reykjavíkur Apótek pharmacy. He is a former councillor in Akransei.

== See also ==
- List of members of the Althing, 2024–2028
