= Þverfellshorn =

Mountain in Iceland

- Location within Iceland

Highest point
- Elevation: 840 m (2,760 ft)
- Coordinates: 64°13′55″N 21°42′40″W

Naming
- Language of name: Icelandic

Geography
- Location: Capital Region, Iceland
- Parent range: Esjan

Climbing
- Easiest route: Hike

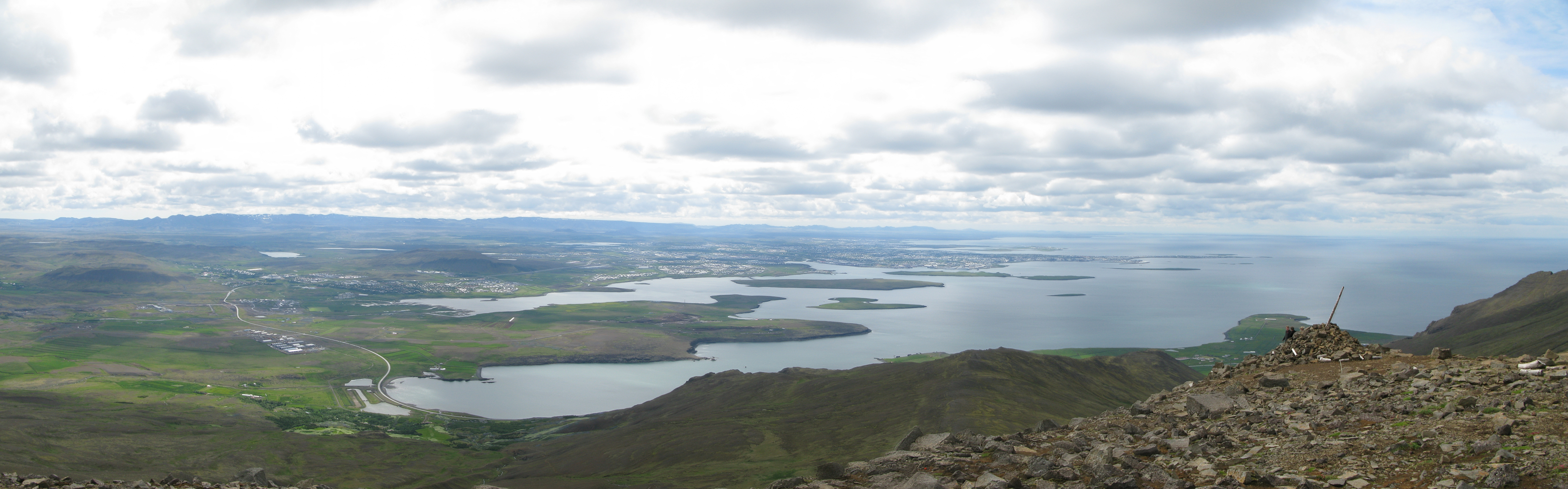
View from the Þverfellshorn peak towards Mosfellsbær and Reykjavík

Þverfellshorn (Icelandic pronunciation: [ˈθvɛrˌfɛlsˌhɔ(r)tn̥]) is a peak in the Esjan mountains of Capital Region (Greater Reykjavík) in southwestern Iceland. It is located roughly 15 kilometres (9.3 mi) by air northeast of Reykjavík. It is one of the most visited peaks in Iceland, attracting hikers for its scenic views. Its elevation range is 820 metres (2,690 ft) - 840 metres (2,760 ft). The car park at the foot of the mountain is known as "Mógilsá".
