= Jóhanna María Sigmundsdóttir =

Icelandic politician (born 1991)

Member of the Althing
- In office 2013–2016

Personal details
- Born: 28 June 1991 (age 35) Reykjavík, Iceland
- Party: Progressive Party

Jóhanna María Sigmundsdóttir (born 28 June 1991) is an Icelandic politician. She was a member of the Althing for the Northwest Constituency from 2013 to 2016.

== Biography ==
Jóhanna completed her agricultural science studies at the agricultural college of Hvanneyri and worked as a farmer in the Westfjords. From 2012 until 2013, she was a board member of the Young Farmers Association in the Western Region. In 2013, she became the chairperson of the national young farmers union. Since 2013, Jóhanna has been the vice chairperson of the association of young members of the Progressive Party.

Jóhanna is the youngest person ever to be elected to the Althingi, at age 21.
