= Karl V. Matthíasson =

Icelandic politician

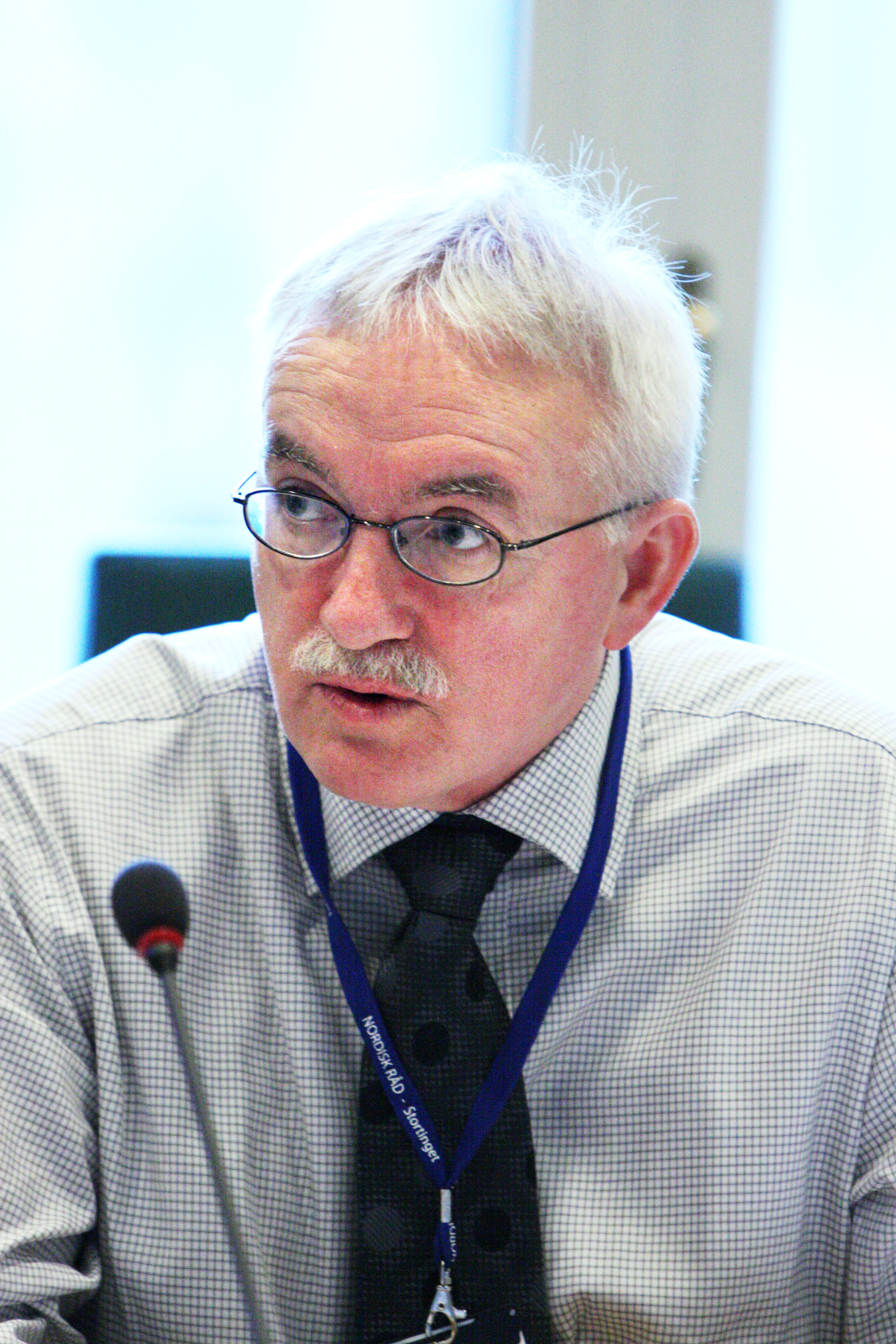

Member of Alþingi
- In office 2001 – 2003; 2007 – 2009

Personal details
- Born: 12 August 1952 (age 74) Akureyri, Iceland
- Party: Social Democratic Alliance; Liberal Party
- Spouse: Sesselja Björk Guðmundsdóttir (m. 1980)
- Children: 3
- Education: University of Iceland

Karl V. Matthíasson (born 12 August 1952) is an Icelandic priest and former politician. He was a member of Alþingi from 2001 to 2003 and again from 2007 to 2009. Originally a member of the Social Democratic Alliance, he joined the Liberal Party in March 2009 due to his views on the fishing industry regulations not coinciding with the views of the party. In the 2009 Icelandic parliamentary election, he failed to win a seat.
