= Haraldur Benediktsson =

Icelandic politician (born 1966)

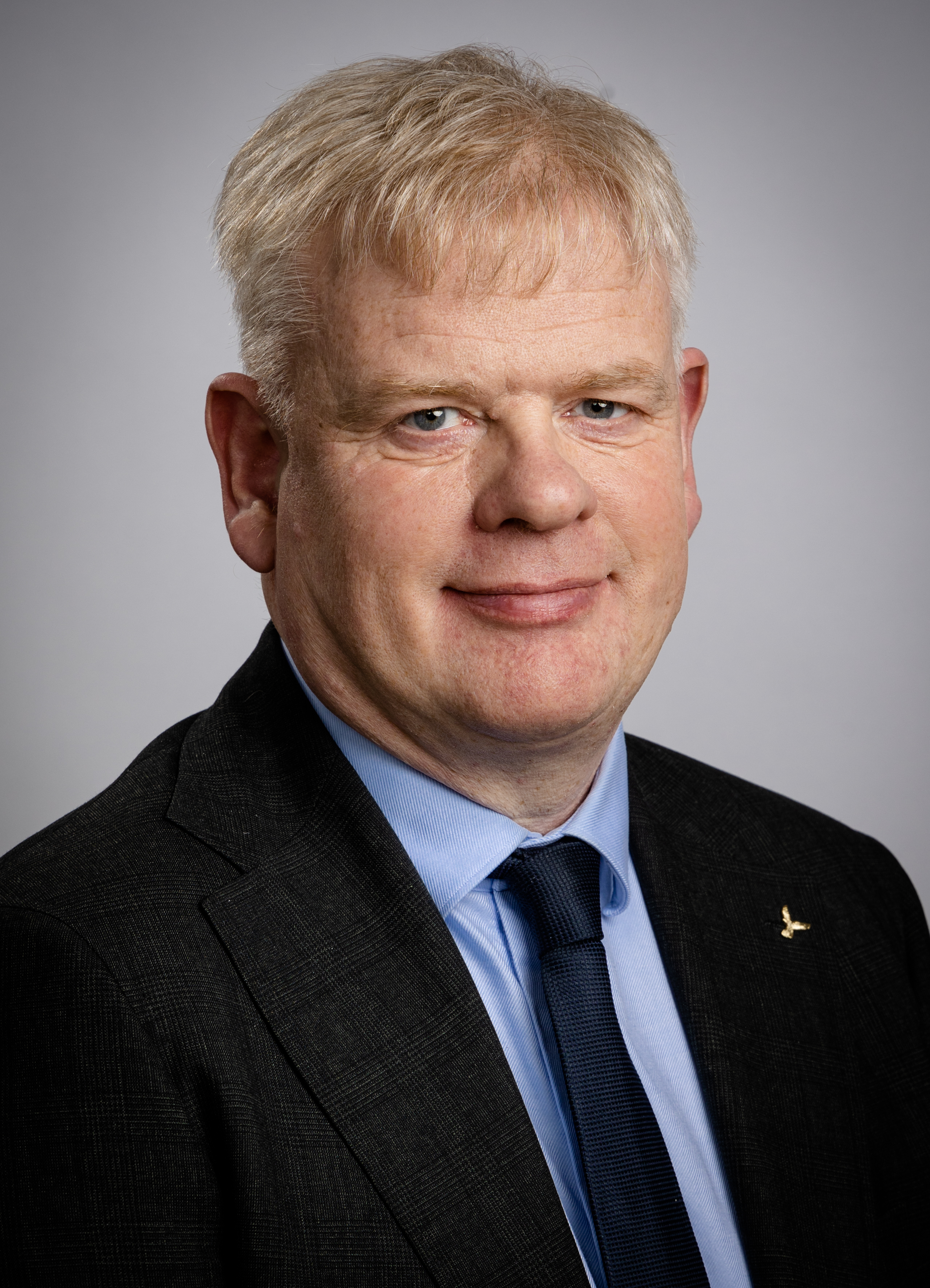
Haraldur Benediktson 2021

Haraldur Benediktsson (born 23 January 1966) is an Icelandic politician from the Independence Party. He represented Northwest in the Parliament of Iceland from 2013 to 2023.

In 2023, he was elected Mayor of Akranes.
