= Magnús Þór Hafsteinsson =

Icelandic politician (1964–2025)

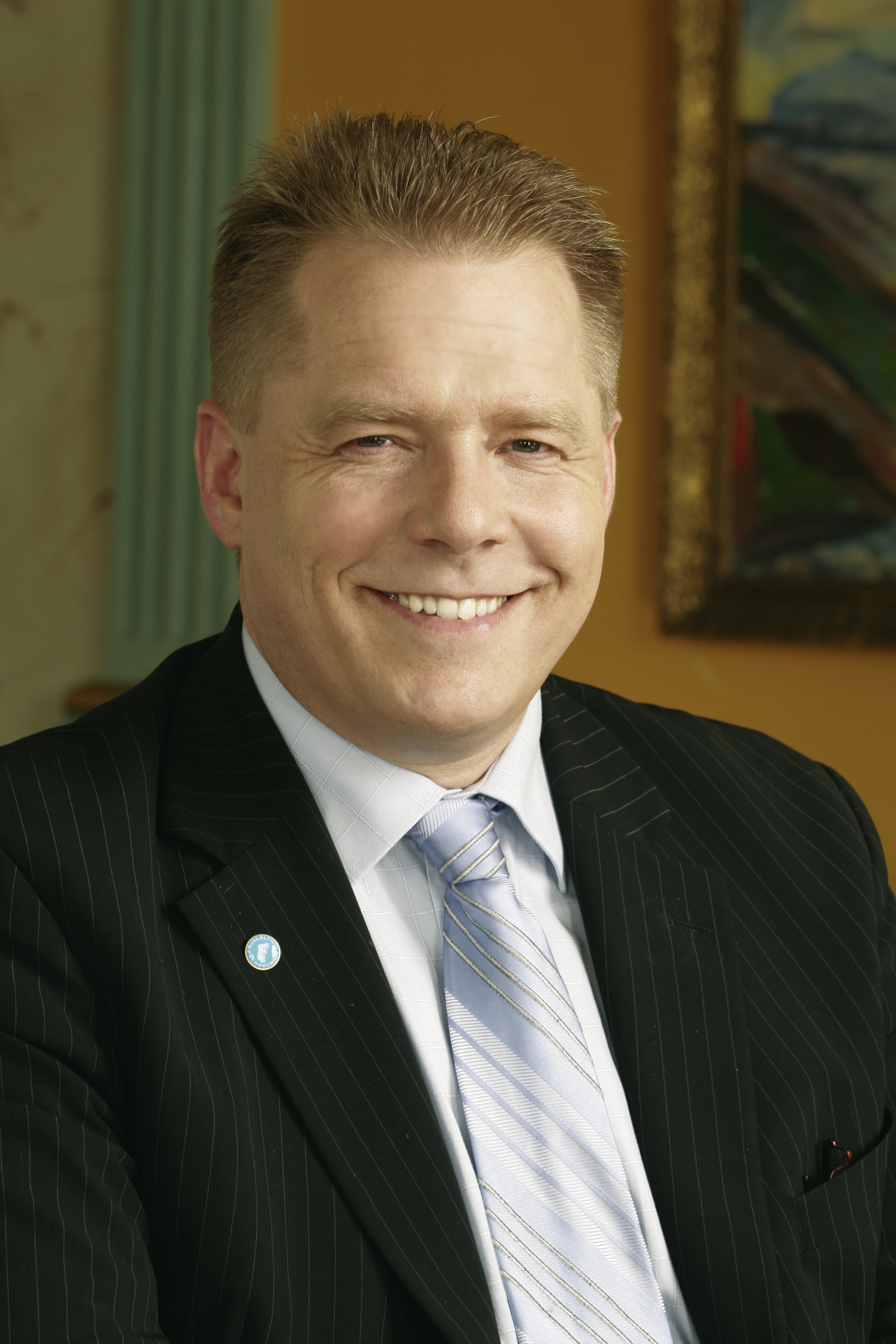
- Born: 29 May 1964; Akranes, Iceland
- Died: 30 June 2025 (aged 61); Patreksfjörður, Iceland
- Occupations: Journalist, politician, writer, and fisherman
- Political party: Liberal Party
- Children: 4

Magnús Þór Hafsteinsson (29 May 1964 – 30 June 2025) was an Icelandic journalist, politician, writer and a fisherman. He served as a member of Alþingi for the Liberal Party from 2003 to 2007. Prior to his political career, he worked as a journalist for RÚV and the Norvegian newspaper Fiskaren. He was educated in ichthyology.

== Death ==
Magnús died on 30 June 2025, at the age of 61, whilst the fishing boat that he was on sank off Patreksfjörður.
