= Hvalfjarðarstrandarhreppur =

Municipality of Iceland

Coordinates: 64°25′N 21°35′W

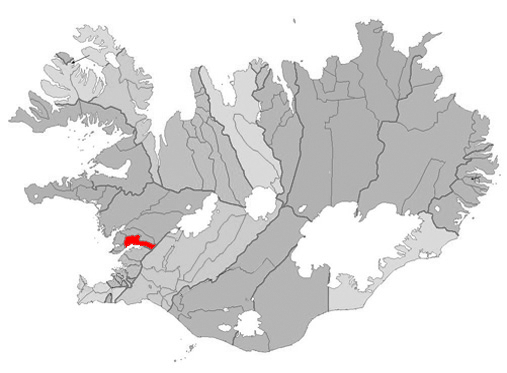

Hvalfjarðarstrandarhreppur (Icelandic pronunciation: [ˈkʰvalˌfjarðarˌstrantar̥ˌr̥ɛhpʏr̥]) was a municipality of Iceland. As of December 1, 2004, its population was 147.

== History ==
On 1 June 2006, it merged, along with the former municipalities of Innri-Akraneshreppi, Leirár- og Melahreppi and Skilmannahreppi, in the new one of Hvalfjarðarsveit.
