= Akrafjall =

Volcanic mountain in western Iceland

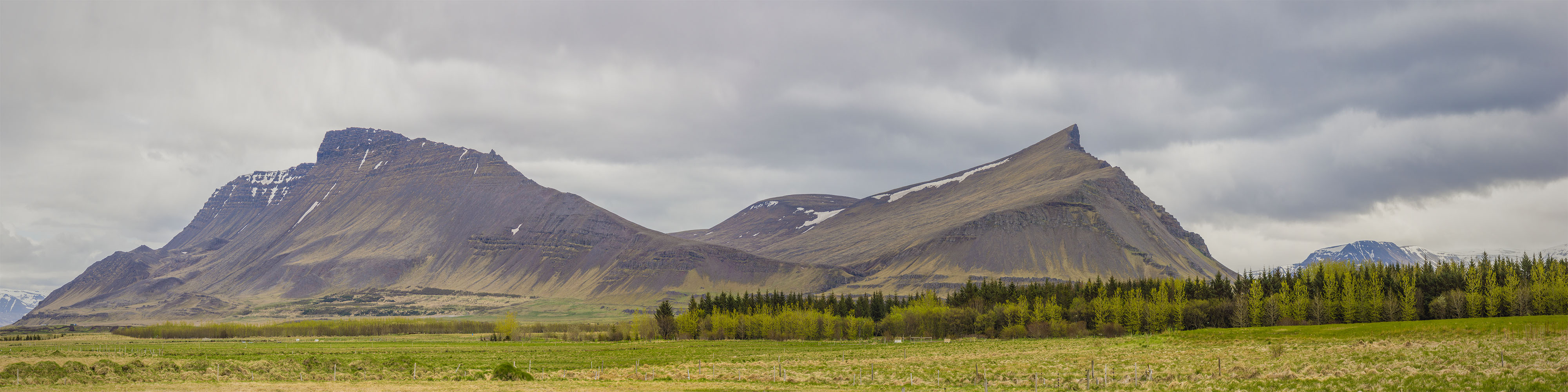
- Akrafjall

Highest point
- Elevation: 643 m (2,110 ft)
- Coordinates: 64°20′38″N 21°54′59″W

Geography
- Country: Iceland

Akrafjall is a volcanic mountain in western Iceland. It is located in the municipality of Hvalfjarðarsveit, east of the city of Akranes.

== Location ==
Akrafjall is located north of the capital Reykjavík, on a peninsula between the fjords Borgarfjörður and Hvalfjörður (whale fjord).

A mountain with two main summits, Akrafjall is divided by the Berjadalur valley which was cut out by a glacier. The highest peak of the mountain, called Geirmundartindur (Geirmundur Peak), reaches a height of 643 meters. Opposite it is the second highest peak of the mountain, Háihnúkur (555 m).

For hiking enthusiasts, a trail leads most of the way to the summit. Depending on a hiker's level of fitness, reaching the summit may take anywhere from 2 to 5 hours. A picturesque mountain, Akrafjall offers extensive views from Reykjanes to Snaefellsjokull Glacier and across Faxafloi Bay.

The cliffs of Akrafjall are a popular nesting ground for the great black-backed gull and the Icelandic fulmar in the country. Even today, many people pick thousands of great black-backed gull eggs every summer to eat.

== Geology & history ==
Basalt constitutes the main geological feature from the lava that brought Akrafjall into being.

It is said that Arnes Pálsson, a notorious thief and vagabond, went into hiding on Akrafjall in 1756 to escape justice. When a search party was assembled to look for him, he shrewdly joined the group. Only when they returned home after an entire day of futile search did the search party reportedly realize that Pálsson had fooled them. He was eventually arrested in 1764.
