= Friðjón Þórðarson =

Icelandic politician (1923–2009)

4th President of the West Nordic Council
- In office 1989–1990
- Preceded by: Preben Lange
- Succeeded by: Karin Kjølbro

Minister of Justice and Ecclesiastical Affairs
- In office 8 February 1980 – 26 May 1983
- Preceded by: Vilmundur Gylfason
- Succeeded by: Jón Helgason

Personal details
- Born: 5 February 1923
- Died: 14 December 2009 (aged 86)

Friðjón Þórðarson (5 February 1923 – 14 December 2009) was an Icelandic politician and former Minister of Justice and Ecclesiastical Affairs (1980–1983). In 1989-1990 he served as the president of the West Nordic Council.
