= Halldór Eggert Sigurðsson =

Icelandic politician (1915–2003)

Halldór Eggert Sigurðsson (9 September 1915 – 25 May 2003) was an Icelandic politician and former Minister of Finance of Iceland from 1971 until 1974.
