= Silicor Materials =

American silicon manufacturing company

Silicor Materials Inc.
- Company type: Private
- Predecessor: Calisolar
- Founded: 2006
- Headquarters: San Jose, California, U.S.
- Website: www.silicormaterials.com

Silicor Materials Inc. is a privately held manufacturer of solar silicon and aluminum alloy. Silicor is headquartered in San Jose, California, and its silicon purification operations are performed by its wholly owned subsidiary, Silicor Materials Canada Inc., in Ontario, Canada.

== History ==
The organization was founded as a development company in 2006 under the name Calisolar, with the goal of manufacturing low-cost photovoltaic (PV) solar cells from silicon designed specifically for the solar industry. The company then acquired 6N Silicon, Inc. in 2010. The company was renamed "Silicor Materials" in 2012, when its focus shifted exclusively to solar silicon manufacturing.

Silicor has a research and development facility in Berlin, Germany, and is currently building a commercial manufacturing facility in the port of Grundartangi, Iceland. The facility will have a nameplate capacity of 16,000 metric tons, with the ability to yield up to 19,000 metric tons of solar silicon each year. To date, more than 20 million solar cells have been made with Silicor's solar silicon.

== Technology ==
Silicor Materials uses a unique silicon purification process, which it obtained with the acquisition of 6N Silicon, Inc. Silicor Materials says that it owns intellectual property and patents on processes related to silicon purification, crystallization, wafering, and cell processing. Silicor Materials' solar silicon is shipped globally to manufacturers who cast the material into ingots, cut the ingots into bricks, cut those bricks into wafers using wire saws and convert the wafers into solar cells. These cells are then assembled into conventional aluminum-framed, glass-encapsulated solar modules (also known as solar panels) for use in distributed and centralized solar applications.

In contrast to the Siemens Process, which requires a total of four phase changes—solid to liquid, liquid to gas, gas to liquid, liquid to solid—Silicor's silicon only goes through two phase changes- solid to liquid and liquid to solid. This change reduces the manufacturing energy requirements to an estimated total usage of 10 to 25 kWh/kg. Silicor's method does not require the use or handling of hazardous chemicals such as silane or trichlorosilane gas, which are required in both the Siemens and Fluid Bed silicon purification processes. This contributes to improved worker safety, the avoidance of recycle and disposal costs, faster facility permitting and reduced facility construction footprint.

== See also ==
- Solar energy
- Photovoltaics companies
- Photovoltaics
- Silicon
