= Stefán Vagn Stefánsson =

Icelandic politician (born 1972)

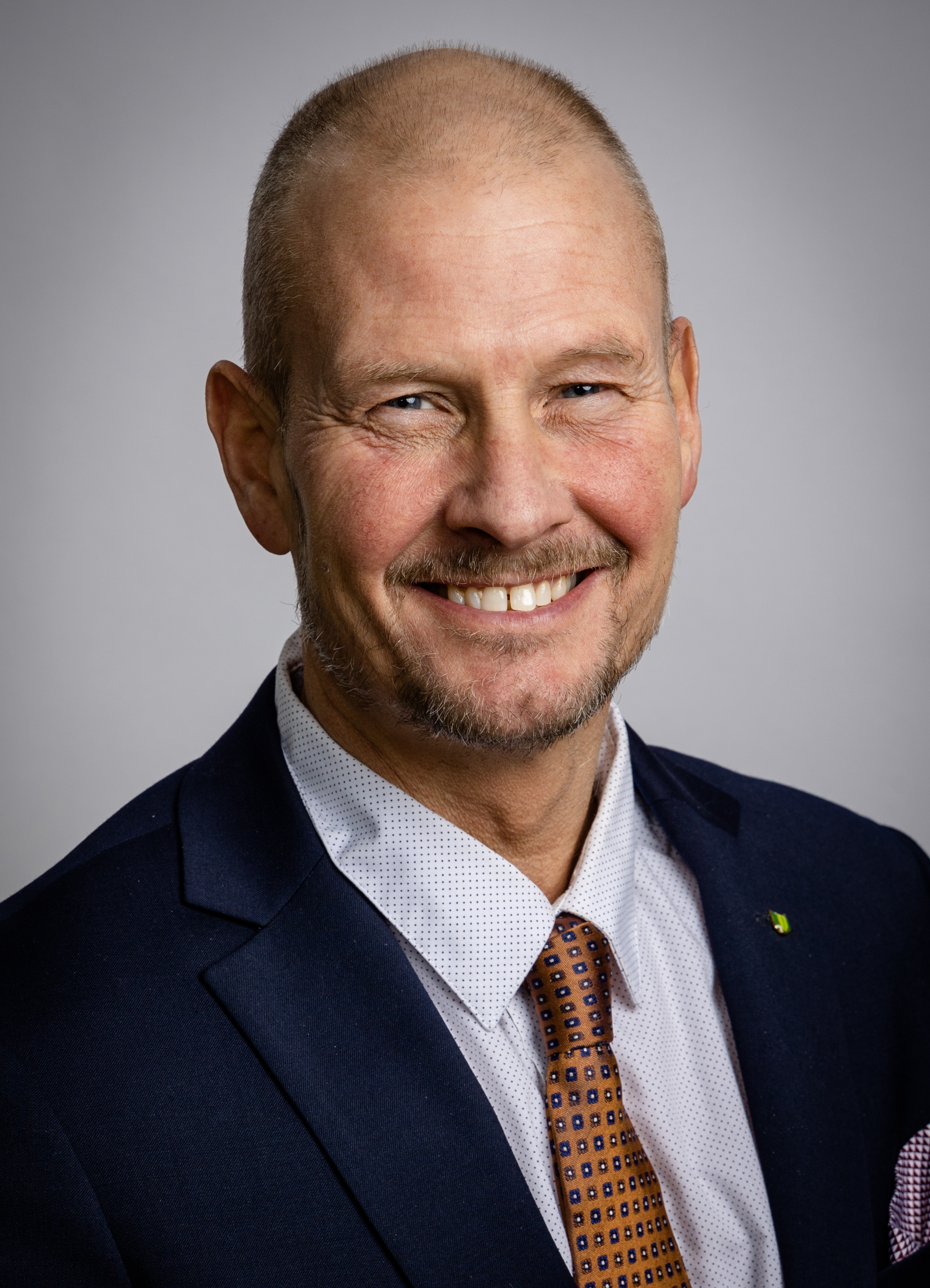
- Stefán Vagn Stefánsson in 2021

Member of the Althing
- Incumbent
- Assumed office 2021
- Constituency: Northwest

Personal details
- Born: 17 July 1972 (age 53)
- Party: Progressive Party
- Spouse: Hrafnhildur Guðjónsdottir
- Children: 3

Stefán Vagn Stefánsson (born 17 January 1972) is an Icelandic politician. He is a member of the Icelandic Parliament for the Progressive Party in the Northwest Constituency. His parents are Hrafnhildur Stefánsdóttir from Hjaltastöðum í Blönduhlíð in Skagafjörður and Stefán Sigurður Guðmundsson, a former member of the Icelandic Parliament from Sauðárkrókur.

Stefán began working for the Icelandic Police in Sauðárkrókur in 1997 and worked there until 1998 when he began working for the Reykjavík police. He began studying at the State Police Academy in 1998 and after graduating, Stefán began working for the Reykjavík police. In 2001, he began working in the National Police Commissioner's Special Unit and worked there until 2007. He began working in the National Police Commissioner's Analysis Department from 2007 to 2008 when he began working as a senior police officer in Sauðárkrókur. Stefán worked alongside his police work at the Ministry of Foreign Affairs and went to Afghanistan as a peacekeeper from 2006 to 2007. Stefán has three children, two daughters and one son.

Stefán was elected to the municipal council of Skagafjörður in 2010 as the leader of the Progressive Party's list. After the 2010 municipal elections, he was elected chairman of the municipality's regional council.

In the spring of 2014, Stefán was appointed chairman of the government's Northwest Committee, which was intended to discuss ways to strengthen the economy and society in Northwest Iceland. The committee submitted proposals. Since December 2014 he was involved in moving the headquarters of RARIK to Sauðárkrókur, as well as some of the activities of the Icelandic Coast Guard, mainly the Guard's ship operations.

Stefán Vagn was elected to parliament for the Progressive Party in the Northwest Constituency in the 2021 Icelandic parliamentary election. He was re-elected in the 2024 Icelandic parliamentary election.

== See also ==
- List of members of the Althing, 2021–2024
- List of members of the Althing, 2024–2028
