= Icelandic Movement – Living Country =

Defunct political party in Iceland

Icelandic Movement – Living Country Íslandshreyfingin – lifandi land
- Chairperson: Ómar Ragnarsson
- Vice-chairperson: Sigurlín Margrét Sigurðardóttir
- Founded: 2007
- Dissolved: 2009
- Merged into: Social Democratic Alliance
- Ideology: Green politics

Icelandic Movement – Living Country (Icelandic: Íslandshreyfingin – lifandi land) was a green political party in Iceland founded by the reporter and environmentalist Ómar Ragnarsson and Sigurlín Margrét Sigurðardóttir in 2007 to contest the 2007 parliamentary election. It failed to clear the 5% election threshold and did not enter the Alþingi. At the Social Democratic Alliance's party congress in late March 2009, the Icelandic Movement became part of the SDA.

== Election results ==
Election	Votes	Vote %	Seats	Place
2007	5,953	3.3	0	6th
