= Skorradalshreppur =

Municipality in Iceland

- Former municipality
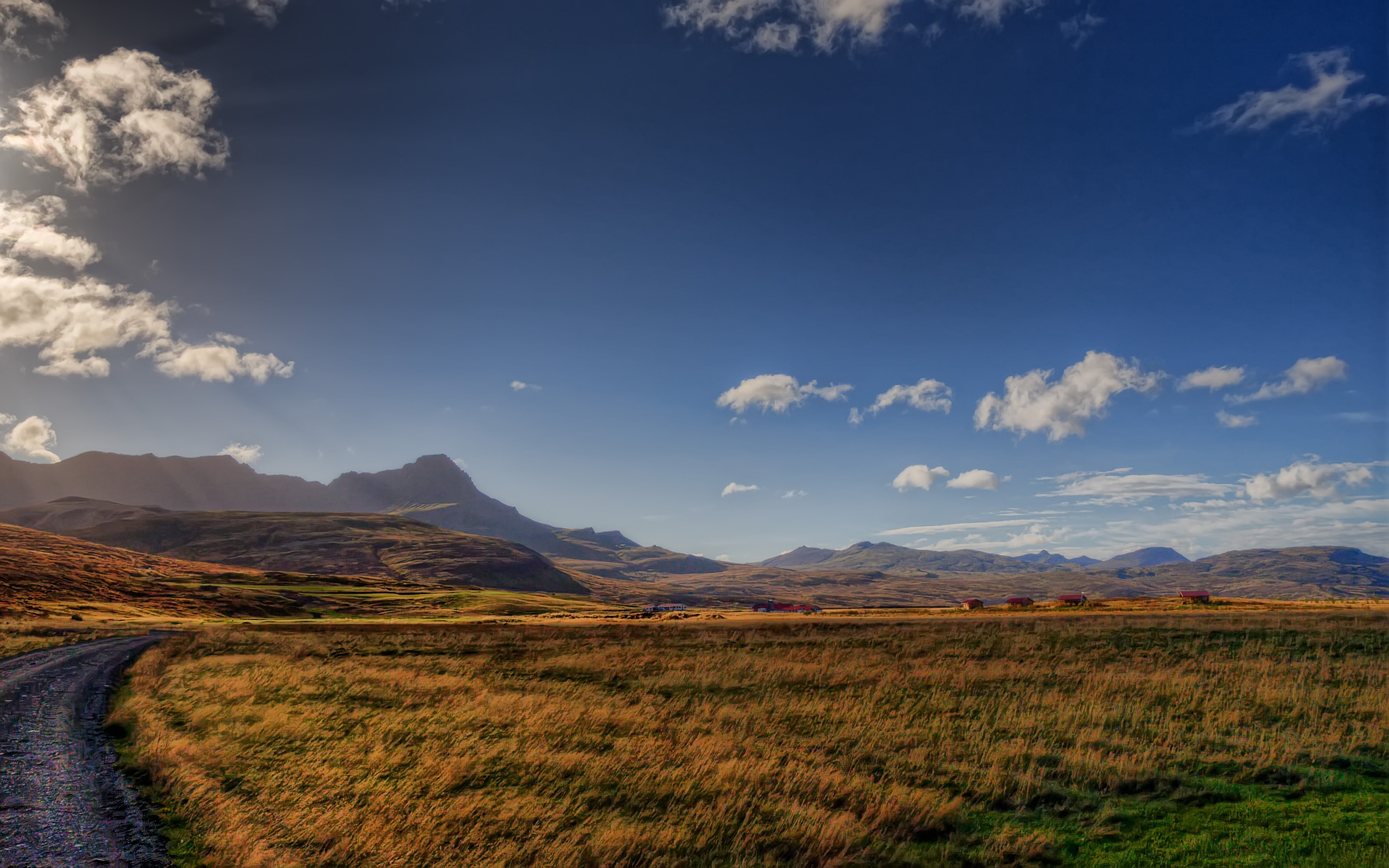
- Skyline of Skorradalshreppur

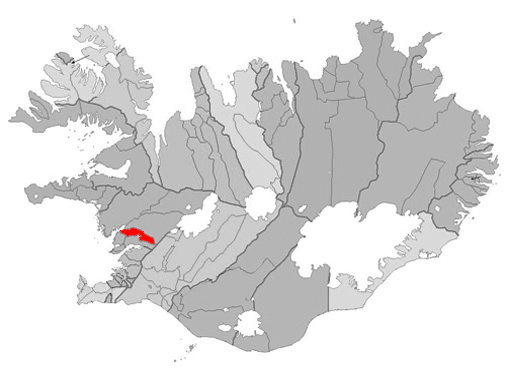
- Location of the municipality

- Location within Iceland
- Coordinates: 64°30′18″N 21°27′53″W
- Country: Iceland
- Region: Western Region
- Constituency: Northwest Constituency

Area
  - Total: 216 km^{2} (83 sq mi)

Population
  - Total: 75
  - Density: 0.27/km^{2} (0.70/sq mi)
- Municipal number: 3506
- Website: skorradalur.is

Skorradalshreppur (Icelandic pronunciation: [ˈskɔrːaˌtalsˌr̥ehpʏr̥]) is a former municipality in Iceland.

In September 2025, residents voted to unify with Borgarbyggð after previously rejecting several unification proposals. The merger was completed in spring 2026.
