= Liberal Party (Iceland) =

Liberal Party Frjálslyndi flokkurinn
- Founder: Sverrir Hermannsson
- Founded: 28 November 1998
- Dissolved: 18 March 2012
- Split from: Independence Party
- Merged into: Dawn
- Ideology: Liberalism; Anti-establishment; Coastal and fishermen's interests; Euroscepticism
- Political position: Centre-right
- Colours: Blue and White

Website
- xf.is

The Liberal Party (Icelandic: Frjálslyndi flokkurinn) was a liberal political party in Iceland. Its main issue was fisheries policy and it drew its main support from coastal villages.

The Liberal Party was founded by former Independence Party MP Sverrir Hermannsson in 1998. It was founded primarily in opposition to the fishing quota, and became a protest vote. In the following year's election, the party won two seats out of 63. This climbed to four in 2003: a level that was maintained at the 2007 election. However, the party lost all its parliamentary representation in 2009, after a financial crisis hit the country.

The party was a strong supporter of the free market, against subsidies and monopolies, and in favour of civil liberties. It was oriented particularly towards the fishing industry and campaigns for the coastal electorate. It advocated the redistribution of fishing rights, as few big fishing companies had bought up around 70% of all quotas. While Reykjavík-based large-scale fisheries became rich, some coastal villages that were dependent on draught became impoverished. The party decided in March 2012 to merge with the newly formed Dawn.

== History ==
The Liberal Party was founded by Sverrir Hermannsson, a former MP of the Independence Party and CEO of Landsbanki, in November 1998. Sverrir had been a member of Independence-led governments from 1983 to 1988 before he went into the private sector. He turned his back to the Independence Party in disappointment over their turn to neoliberal policies.

In 2006/2007, the minor New Force party merged into the Liberal Party, which caused the prominent Liberal Party member Margrét Sverrisdóttir to leave the party and join the Icelandic Movement - Living Land, threatening to split the Liberal Party.

The party had, before the 2007 parliament elections, moved from being primarily focused on issues of fishing quotas and small fishing communities toward immigration. It was the only political party in Iceland that supports strict restrictions on immigration, and consequently the party was accused of xenophobia. The party conducted a members' poll in January 2009 in order to determine its EU stance. The outcome was against EU-accession of Iceland. The party supports strict neutrality.

In February 2009, two of the Liberal Party's parliamentarians left the party; Jón Magnússon joined the Independence Party and Kristinn H. Gunnarsson joined the Progressive Party.

== Ideology ==
=== Fishing quotas ===
The party was founded in opposition of the fishing quotas system which the Independence Party and Progressive Party passed in 1983. The party sought to represent those coastal villages that felt left out as the ownership of the quotas was consolidated in a few Reykjavík-based fisheries.

=== Privatisation ===
The party was not as positive towards privatisations as the Independence Party. It opposed the privatisation on the energy company Hitaveita Suðurnesja.

=== Immigration ===
The party had a conservative attitude towards immigration and wished to implement further restrictions.

=== Foreign policy ===
The part was against the idea of Iceland joining the European Union. The party's stance was decided in a party members' poll which was conducted in December 2008. The question was: Should Iceland seek EU-membership?. The results were published in January 2009 with 51.6% being against EU-accession, 34.8% in favour and 9.5% undecided.

The party supported Iceland's membership of NATO, but was firmly opposed to the U.S. invasion and occupation of Iraq.

== Election results ==
=== Parliament ===
Election	Votes	Vote %	Seats	Place
1999	6,919	4.2	2 / 63	5th
2003	13,523 ▲	7.4 ▲	4 / 63	5th
2007	13,233 ▼	7.3 ▼	4 / 63	5th
2009	4,148 ▼	2.2 ▼	0 / 63	6th ▼

== Leaders ==
=== Chairpersons ===
- Sverrir Hermannsson, 1998–2003
- Guðjón Arnar Kristjánsson, 2003–2010
- Sigurjón Þórðarson, 2010–2012

=== Vice-chairpersons ===
- Gunnar Ingi Gunnarsson, 1998–2003
- Magnús Þór Hafsteinsson, 2003–2009
- Ásgerður Flosadóttir 2009
- Kolbrún Stefánsdóttir, 2009–2010
- Ásta Hafberg, 2010–2012

== See also ==
- Politics of Iceland
- Liberalism and centrism in Iceland
- Liberalism
- Liberal democracy
- Contributions to liberal theory
