= Guðjón Arnar Kristjánsson =

Icelandic politician (1944–2018)

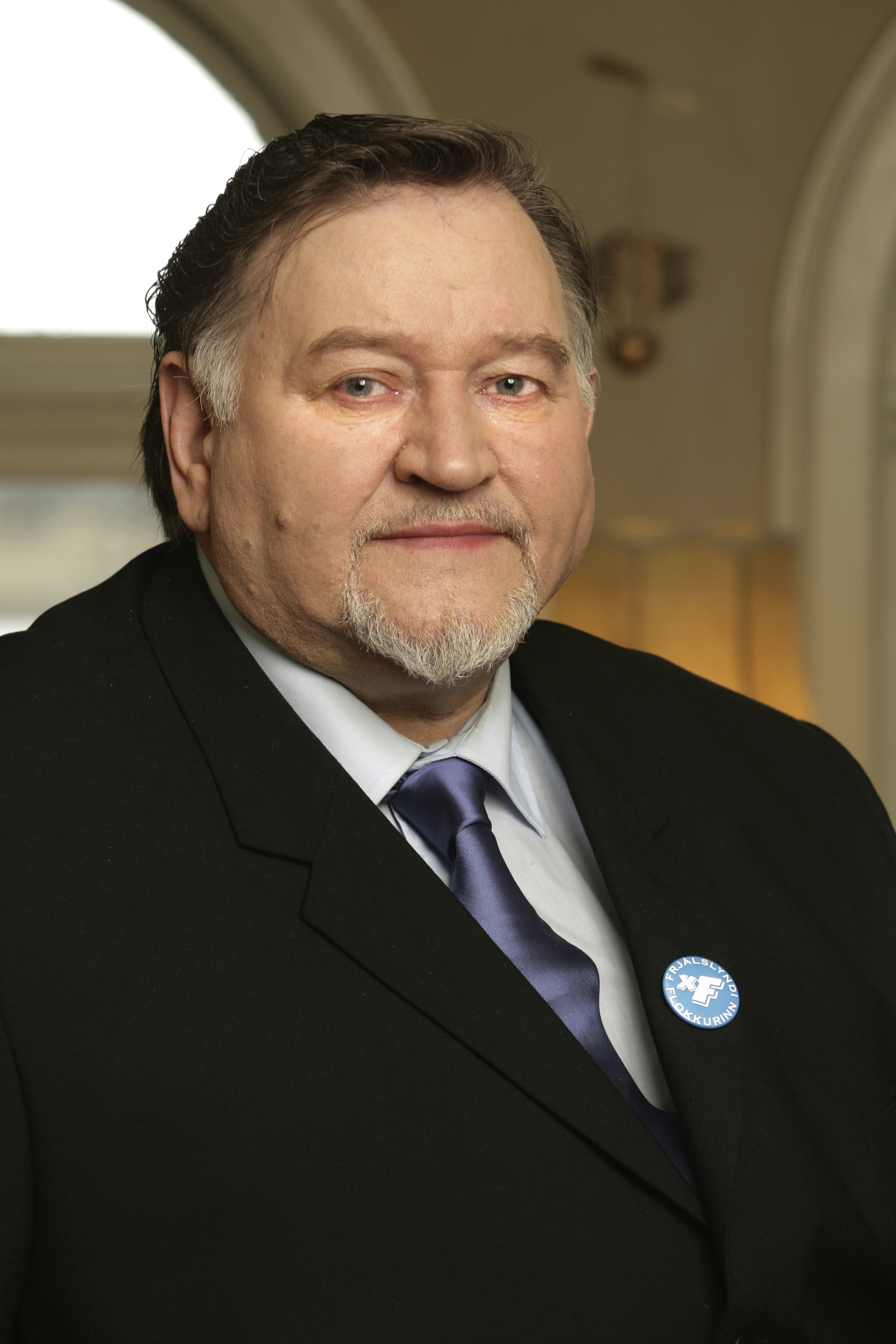

Personal details
- Born: 5 July 1944 Ísafjörður, Iceland
- Died: 17 March 2018 (aged 73) Reykjavík, Iceland
- Cause of death: Cancer
- Party: Independence Party; Liberal Party
- Nickname: Addi Kitta Gau

Guðjón Arnar Kristjánsson (5 July 1944 – 17 March 2018) was an Icelandic politician and chairman of the Liberal Party (Frjálslyndi flokkurinn) from 2003 to 2009. He served as the captain of fishing vessels in the years from 1967 to 1997. He was an active member of the Independence Party and attended meetings of Althingi 8 times in 1991–1995. In 1999 he joined Sverrir Hermannsson and formed the Liberal Party. He was a member of Althingi from 1999 to 2009.

== Personal life ==
Guðjón Arnar was the son of Jóhanna Jakobsdóttir and Kristján Sigmundur Guðjónsson, commonly known as Kitti Gau (short for Kristján Guðjónsson). As such, Guðjón Arnar was commonly referred to as Addi Kitta Gau which means Addi (short for Arnar) son of Kitti Gau.

== Death ==
Guðjón Arnar died on 17 March 2018 in the National University Hospital of Iceland after a battle with cancer.
