= Northeastern (Althing constituency) =

Former constituency of the Althing, the national legislature of Iceland

- Norðurlandi eystra
- Former Constituency for the Althing
- Althing constituencies between 1959 and 2003
- Municipality: List: Aðaldælahreppur; Akureyri; Arnarneshreppur; Bárðdælahreppur; Dalvíkurbyggð; Eyjafjarðarsveit; Glæsibæjarhreppur; Grímseyjarhreppur; Grýtubakkahreppur; Hálshreppur; Hríseyjarhreppur; Húsavíkurbær; Kelduneshreppur; Ljósavatnshreppur; Ólafsfjarðarbær; Öxarfjarðarhreppur; Öxnadalshreppur; Raufarhafnarhreppur; Reykdælahreppur; Reykjahreppur; Skriðuhreppur; Skútustaðahreppur; Svalbarðshreppur; Svalbarðsstrandarhreppur; Tjörneshreppur; Þórshafnarhreppur
- Region: Northeastern

Former Constituency
- Created: 1959
- Abolished: 2003
- Seats: List (Note: Excludes compensatory seats.): 5 (1995–2003); 6 (1959–1995)
- Created from: List: Akureyri; Eyjafjarðarsýsla; North Þingeyjarsýsla; South Þingeyjarsýsla
- Replaced by: Northeast

Northeastern (Icelandic: Norðurlandi eystra) was one of the multi-member constituencies of the Althing, the national legislature of Iceland. The constituency was established in 1959 following the nationwide extension of proportional representation for elections to the Althing. It was abolished in 2003 following the re-organisation of constituencies across Iceland when it was merged with the Eastern constituency to form the Northeast constituency. Northeastern was conterminous with the Northeastern region.

== Election results ==
=== Summary ===
Election	People's Alliance G			Left-Green U			Social Democrats S / A			Progressive B			Independence D		
Election	Votes	%	Seats	Votes	%	Seats	Votes	%	Seats	Votes	%	Seats	Votes	%	Seats
1999				3,483	22.04%	1	2,652	16.78%	1	4,610	29.17%	1	4,717	29.85%	2
1995	2,741	16.78%	1				1,211	7.41%	0	6,015	36.82%	2	4,606	28.19%	2
1991	2,795	17.82%	1				1,522	9.70%	0	5,388	34.34%	3	3,720	23.71%	2
1987	2,053	13.13%	1				2,229	14.26%	1	3,889	24.88%	2	3,273	20.94%	1
1983	2,308	16.84%	1				1,504	10.97%	0	4,751	34.67%	3	3,727	27.20%	2
1979	2,141	15.93%	1				1,789	13.31%	1	5,896	43.87%	3	2,758	20.52%	1
1978	2,580	19.85%	1				2,876	22.13%	1	4,150	31.93%	2	2,944	22.65%	2
1974	1,731	14.29%	1				1,098	9.06%	0	4,811	39.71%	3	3,661	30.22%	2
1971	1,215	10.69%	0				1,147	10.09%	0	4,677	41.15%	3	2,939	25.86%	2
1967	1,571	15.03%	1				1,357	12.98%	0	4,525	43.29%	3	2,999	28.69%	2
1963	1,621	16.18%	1				1,012	10.10%	0	4,530	45.21%	3	2,856	28.51%	2
1959 Oct	1,373	14.35%	1				1,045	10.92%	0	4,166	43.53%	3	2,645	27.64%	2

(Excludes compensatory seats.)

=== Detailed ===
==== 1990s ====
===== 1999 =====
Results of the 1999 parliamentary election held on 8 May 1999:

Party		Votes	%	Seats		
Party		Votes	%	Con.	Com.	Tot.
Independence Party	D	4,717	29.85%	2	0	2
Progressive Party	B	4,610	29.17%	1	0	1
Left-Green Movement	U	3,483	22.04%	1	1	2
Social Democratic Alliance	S	2,652	16.78%	1	0	1
Liberal Party	F	297	1.88%	0	0	0
Humanist Party	H	43	0.27%	0	0	0
Valid votes		15,802	100.00%	5	1	6
Blank votes		243	1.51%			
Rejected votes – other		28	0.17%			
Total polled		16,073	84.55%			
Registered electors		19,011				

The following candidates were elected:

- Constituency seats - Halldór Blöndal (D), 4,669 votes; Steingrímur J. Sigfússon (U), 3,480 votes; Svanfríður Jónasdóttir (S), 2,596 votes; Tómas Ingi Olrich (D), 4,691 votes; and Valgerður Sverrisdóttir (B), 4,458 votes.
- Compensatory seats - Árni Steinar Jóhannsson (U), 3,476 votes.

===== 1995 =====
Results of the 1995 parliamentary election held on 8 April 1995:

Party		Votes	%	Seats		
Party		Votes	%	Con.	Com.	Tot.
Progressive Party	B	6,015	36.82%	2	0	2
Independence Party	D	4,606	28.19%	2	0	2
People's Alliance	G	2,741	16.78%	1	0	1
Association for Justice and Equality	J	1,414	8.65%	0	1	1
Social Democratic Party	A	1,211	7.41%	0	0	0
Women's List	V	351	2.15%	0	0	0
Valid votes		16,338	100.00%	5	1	6
Blank votes		199	1.20%			
Rejected votes – other		44	0.27%			
Total polled		16,581	87.40%			
Registered electors		18,971				

The following candidates were elected:

- Constituency seats - Guðmundur Kristján Bjarnason (B), 5,965 votes; Halldór Blöndal (D), 4,587 votes; Steingrímur J. Sigfússon (G), 2,715 votes; Tómas Ingi Olrich (D), 4,568 votes; and Valgerður Sverrisdóttir (B), 5,962 votes.
- Compensatory seats - Svanfríður Jónasdóttir (J), 1,408 votes.

===== 1991 =====
Results of the 1991 parliamentary election held on 20 April 1991:

Party		Votes	%	Seats		
Party		Votes	%	Con.	Com.	Tot.
Progressive Party	B	5,388	34.34%	3	0	3
Independence Party	D	3,720	23.71%	2	0	2
People's Alliance	G	2,795	17.82%	1	0	1
Social Democratic Party	A	1,522	9.70%	0	1	1
National Party and Humanist Party	Þ	1,062	6.77%	0	0	0
Women's List	V	751	4.79%	0	0	0
Home Rule Association	H	302	1.93%	0	0	0
Liberals	F	148	0.94%	0	0	0
Valid votes		15,688	100.00%	6	1	7
Blank votes		226	1.42%			
Rejected votes – other		9	0.06%			
Total polled		15,923	86.44%			
Registered electors		18,420				

The following candidates were elected:

- Constituency seats - Guðmundur Kristján Bjarnason (B), 5,354 votes; Halldór Blöndal (D), 3,232 votes; Jóhannes Geir Sigurgeirsson (B), 5,328 votes; Steingrímur J. Sigfússon (G), 2,788 votes; Tómas Ingi Olrich (D), 3,700 votes; and Valgerður Sverrisdóttir (B), 5,340 votes.
- Compensatory seats - Sigbjörn Gunnarsson (A), 1,475 votes.

==== 1980s ====
===== 1987 =====
Results of the 1987 parliamentary election held on 25 April 1987:

Party		Votes	%	Seats		
Party		Votes	%	Con.	Com.	Tot.
Progressive Party	B	3,889	24.88%	2	0	2
Independence Party	D	3,273	20.94%	1	0	1
Social Democratic Party	A	2,229	14.26%	1	0	1
People's Alliance	G	2,053	13.13%	1	0	1
Association for Justice and Equality	J	1,893	12.11%	1	0	1
Women's List	V	992	6.35%	0	1	1
Citizens' Party	S	567	3.63%	0	0	0
National Party	Þ	533	3.41%	0	0	0
Humanist Party	M	202	1.29%	0	0	0
Valid votes		15,631	100.00%	6	1	7
Blank votes		141	0.89%			
Rejected votes – other		23	0.15%			
Total polled		15,795	88.16%			
Registered electors		17,917				

The following candidates were elected:

- Constituency seats - Árni Gunnarsson (A), 2,211 votes; Guðmundur Kristján Bjarnason (B), 3,874 votes; Halldór Blöndal (D), 3,182 votes; Stefán Valgeirsson (J), 1,889 votes; Steingrímur J. Sigfússon (G), 2,049 votes; and Valgerður Sverrisdóttir (B), 3,874 votes.
- Compensatory seats - Málfríður Sigurðardóttir (V), 986 votes.

===== 1983 =====
Results of the 1983 parliamentary election held on 23 April 1983:

Party		Votes	%	Seats		
Party		Votes	%	Con.	Com.	Tot.
Progressive Party	B	4,751	34.67%	3	0	3
Independence Party	D	3,727	27.20%	2	0	2
People's Alliance	G	2,308	16.84%	1	0	1
Social Democratic Party	A	1,504	10.97%	0	0	0
Women's List	V	791	5.77%	0	0	0
Alliance of Social Democrats	C	623	4.55%	0	1	1
Valid votes		13,704	100.00%	6	1	7
Blank votes		285	2.03%			
Rejected votes – other		27	0.19%			
Total polled		14,016	87.00%			
Registered electors		16,110				

The following candidates were elected:

- Constituency seats - Guðmundur Kristján Bjarnason (B), 3,971 votes; Halldór Blöndal (D), 3,412 votes; Ingvar Gíslason (B), 4,620 votes; Lárus Jónsson (D), 3,723 votes; Stefán Valgeirsson (B), 4,341 votes; and Steingrímur J. Sigfússon (G), 2,308 votes.
- Compensatory seats - Kolbrún Jónsdóttir (C), 623 votes.

==== 1970s ====
===== 1979 =====
Results of the 1979 parliamentary election held on 2 and 3 December 1979:

Party		Votes	%	Seats		
Party		Votes	%	Con.	Com.	Tot.
Progressive Party	B	5,896	43.87%	3	0	3
Independence Party	D	2,758	20.52%	1	1	2
People's Alliance	G	2,141	15.93%	1	0	1
Social Democratic Party	A	1,789	13.31%	1	0	1
Independent List	S	857	6.38%	0	0	0
Valid votes		13,441	100.00%	6	1	7
Blank votes		267	1.94%			
Rejected votes – other		20	0.15%			
Total polled		13,728	89.58%			
Registered electors		15,324				

The following candidates were elected:

- Constituency seats - Árni Gunnarsson (A), 1,784 votes; Guðmundur Kristján Bjarnason (B), 4,916 votes; Ingvar Gíslason (B), 5,878 votes; Lárus Jónsson (D), 2,757 votes; Stefán Jónsson (G), 2,136 votes; and Stefán Valgeirsson (B), 5,394 votes.
- Compensatory seats - Halldór Blöndal (D), 2,527 votes.

===== 1978 =====
Results of the 1978 parliamentary election held on 25 June 1978:

Party		Votes	%	Seats		
Party		Votes	%	Con.	Com.	Tot.
Progressive Party	B	4,150	31.93%	2	0	2
Independence Party	D	2,944	22.65%	2	0	2
Social Democratic Party	A	2,876	22.13%	1	1	2
People's Alliance	G	2,580	19.85%	1	0	1
Union of Liberals and Leftists	F	448	3.45%	0	0	0
Valid votes		12,998	100.00%	6	1	7
Blank votes		240	1.81%			
Rejected votes – other		44	0.33%			
Total polled		13,282	89.77%			
Registered electors		14,795				

The following candidates were elected:

- Constituency seats - Bragi Sigurjónsson (A), 2,857 votes; Ingvar Gíslason (B), 4,146 votes; Jón G. Sólnes (D), 2,901 votes; Lárus Jónsson (D), 2,695 votes; Stefán Jónsson (G), 2,573 votes; and Stefán Valgeirsson (B), 3,803 votes.
- Compensatory seats - Árni Gunnarsson (A), 2,635 votes.

===== 1974 =====
Results of the 1974 parliamentary election held on 30 June 1974:

Party		Votes	%	Seats		
Party		Votes	%	Con.	Com.	Tot.
Progressive Party	B	4,811	39.71%	3	0	3
Independence Party	D	3,661	30.22%	2	0	2
People's Alliance	G	1,731	14.29%	1	0	1
Social Democratic Party	A	1,098	9.06%	0	0	0
Union of Liberals and Leftists	F	772	6.37%	0	0	0
Democratic Party	M	42	0.35%	0	0	0
Valid votes		12,115	100.00%	6	0	6
Blank votes		121	0.98%			
Rejected votes – other		62	0.50%			
Total polled		12,298	91.70%			
Registered electors		13,411				

The following candidates were elected:

- Constituency seats - Ingi Tryggvason (B), 3,974 votes; Ingvar Gíslason (B), 4,802 votes; Jón G. Sólnes (D), 3,656 votes; Lárus Jónsson (D), 3,354 votes; Stefán Jónsson (G), 1,727 votes; and Stefán Valgeirsson (B), 4,409 votes.

===== 1971 =====
Results of the 1971 parliamentary election held on 13 June 1971:

Party		Votes	%	Seats		
Party		Votes	%	Con.	Com.	Tot.
Progressive Party	B	4,677	41.15%	3	0	3
Independence Party	D	2,939	25.86%	2	0	2
Union of Liberals and Leftists	F	1,389	12.22%	1	0	1
People's Alliance	G	1,215	10.69%	0	0	0
Social Democratic Party	A	1,147	10.09%	0	0	0
Valid votes		11,367	100.00%	6	0	6
Blank votes		115	1.00%			
Rejected votes – other		28	0.24%			
Total polled		11,510	91.62%			
Registered electors		12,563				

The following candidates were elected:

- Constituency seats - Björn Jónsson (F), 1,388 votes; Gísli Guðmundsson (B), 4,660 votes; Ingvar Gíslason (B), 4,280 votes; Lárus Jónsson (D), 2,690 votes; Magnús Jónsson (D), 2,937 votes; and Stefán Valgeirsson (B), 3,887 votes.

==== 1960s ====
===== 1967 =====
Results of the 1967 parliamentary election held on 11 June 1967:

Party		Votes	%	Seats		
Party		Votes	%	Con.	Com.	Tot.
Progressive Party	B	4,525	43.29%	3	0	3
Independence Party	D	2,999	28.69%	2	1	3
People's Alliance	G	1,571	15.03%	1	0	1
Social Democratic Party	A	1,357	12.98%	0	1	1
Valid votes		10,452	100.00%	6	2	8
Blank votes		116	1.10%			
Rejected votes – other		25	0.24%			
Total polled		10,593	90.96%			
Registered electors		11,646				

The following candidates were elected:

- Constituency seats - Björn Jónsson (G), 1,568 votes; Gísli Guðmundsson (B), 4,524 votes; Ingvar Gíslason (B), 4,145 votes; Jónas G. Rafnar (D), 2,993 votes; Magnús Jónsson (D), 2,748 votes; and Stefán Valgeirsson (B), 3,752 votes.
- Compensatory seats - Bjartmar Guðmundsson (D), 1,000 votes; and Bragi Sigurjónsson (A), 1,357 votes.

===== 1963 =====
Results of the 1963 parliamentary election held on 9 June 1963:

Party		Votes	%	Seats		
Party		Votes	%	Con.	Com.	Tot.
Progressive Party	B	4,530	45.21%	3	0	3
Independence Party	D	2,856	28.51%	2	1	3
People's Alliance	G	1,621	16.18%	1	0	1
Social Democratic Party	A	1,012	10.10%	0	0	0
Valid votes		10,019	100.00%	6	1	7
Blank votes		106	1.04%			
Rejected votes – other		29	0.29%			
Total polled		10,154	90.64%			
Registered electors		11,202				

The following candidates were elected:

- Constituency seats - Björn Jónsson (G), 1,620 votes; Gísli Guðmundsson (B), 4,152 votes; Ingvar Gíslason (B), 3,770 votes; Jónas G. Rafnar (D), 2,820 votes; Karl Kristjánson (B), 4,526 votes; and Magnús Jónsson (D), 2,586 votes.
- Compensatory seats - Bjartmar Guðmundsson (D), 952 votes.

==== 1950s ====
===== October 1959 =====
Results of the October 1959 parliamentary election held on 25 and 26 October 1959:

Party		Votes	%	Seats		
Party		Votes	%	Con.	Com.	Tot.
Progressive Party	B	4,166	43.53%	3	0	3
Independence Party	D	2,645	27.64%	2	1	3
People's Alliance	G	1,373	14.35%	1	0	1
Social Democratic Party	A	1,045	10.92%	0	1	1
National Preservation Party	F	341	3.56%	0	0	0
Valid votes		9,570	100.00%	6	2	8
Blank votes		98	1.01%			
Rejected votes – other		30	0.31%			
Total polled		9,698	88.68%			
Registered electors		10,936				

The following candidates were elected:

- Constituency seats - Björn Jónsson (G), 1,371 votes; Garðar Halldórsson (B), 3,456 votes; Gísli Guðmundsson (B), 3,816 votes; Jónas G. Rafnar (D), 2,644 votes; Karl Kristjánson (B), 4,160 votes; and Magnús Jónsson (D), 2,424 votes.
- Compensatory seats - Bjartmar Guðmundsson (D), 882 votes; and Friðjón Skarphéðinsson (A), 1,045 votes.
