= Second cabinet of Davíð Oddsson =

Government of Iceland from 1995 to 1999

- 34th Cabinet of Iceland

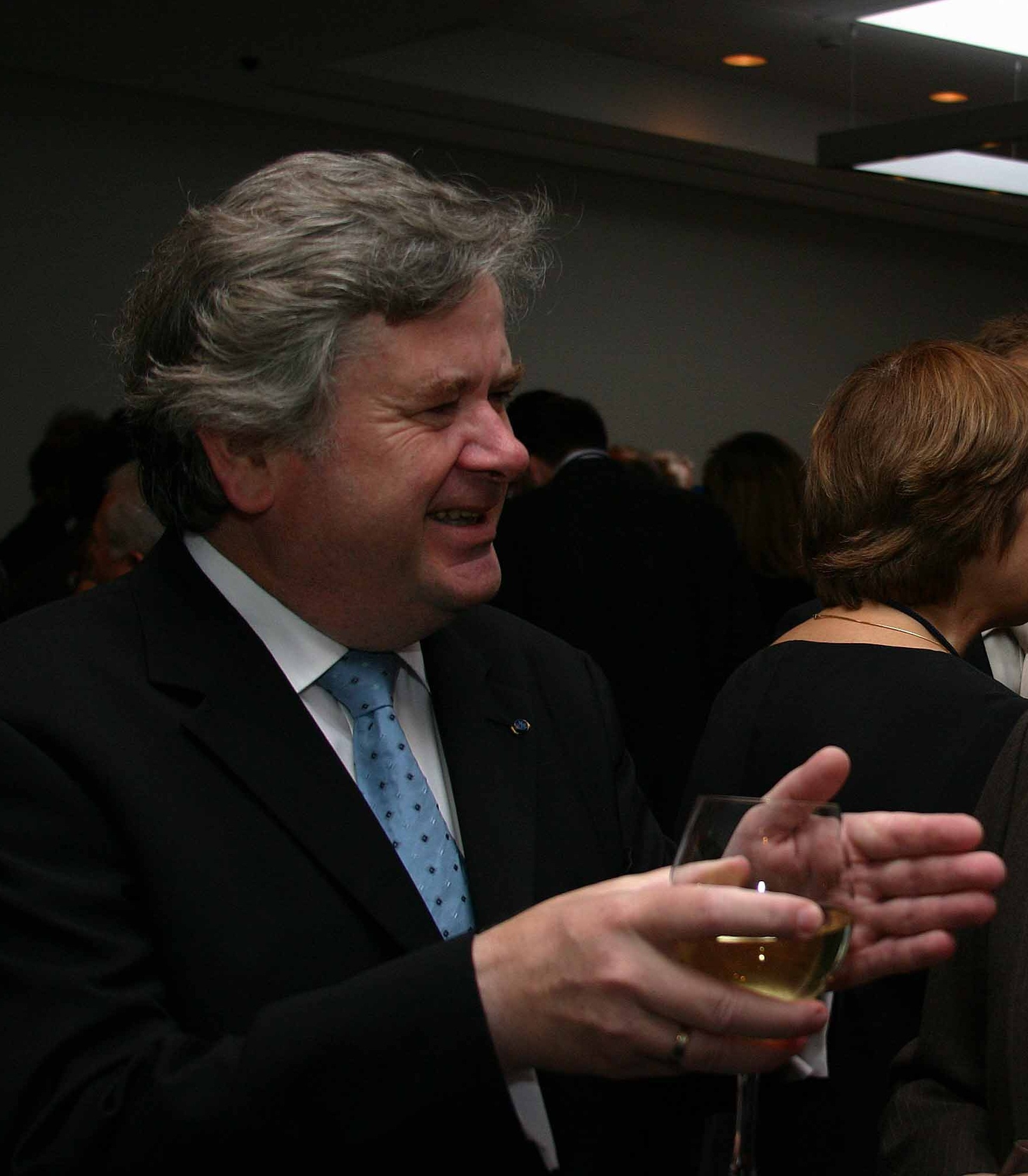
- Davíð Oddsson
- Date formed: 23 April 1995
- Date dissolved: 28 May 1999

People and organisations
- President: Vigdís Finnbogadóttir; (to 1 August 1996); Ólafur Ragnar Grímsson; (from 1 August 1996)
- Prime Minister: Davíð Oddsson
- No. of ministers: 12
- Member parties: Independence Party; Progressive Party
- Status in legislature: Majority government (coalition)
- Opposition parties: People's Alliance; Social Democratic Alliance; National Awakening; Women's List

History
- Election: 1995
- Outgoing election: 1999
- Predecessor: Davíð Oddsson I
- Successor: Davíð Oddsson III

The Second cabinet of Davíð Oddsson in Iceland, nicknamed “The privatization government” (Icelandic: Einkavæðingarstjórnin), was formed on 23 April 1995.

== Cabinets ==
=== Inaugural cabinet: 23 April 1995 – 16 April 1998 ===
Incumbent	Minister	Ministry	Party
Davíð Oddsson	Prime Minister (Forsætisráðherra)	Prime Minister's Office (Forsætisráðuneytið)	IP
Davíð Oddsson	Minister of Statistics Iceland (Ráðherra Hagstofu Íslands)	Statistics Iceland (Hagstofa Íslands)	IP
Björn Bjarnason	Minister of Education, Science and Culture (Menntamálaráðherra)	Ministry of Education, Science and Culture (Menntamálaráðuneytið)	IP
Finnur Ingólfsson	Minister of Commerce (Viðskiptaráðherra)	Ministry of Commerce (Viðskiptaráðuneytið)	PP
Finnur Ingólfsson	Minister of Industry (Iðnaðarráðherra)	Ministry of Industry (Iðnaðarráðuneytið)	PP
Friðrik Klemenz Sophusson	Minister of Finance (Fjármálaráðherra)	Ministry of Finance (Fjármálaráðuneytið)	IP
Guðmundur Kristján Bjarnason	Minister for the Environment (Umhverfisráðherra)	Ministry for the Environment (Umhverfisráðuneytið)	PP
Guðmundur Kristján Bjarnason	Minister of Agriculture (Landbúnaðarráðherra)	Ministry of Agriculture (Landbúnaðarráðuneytið)	PP
Halldór Ásgrímsson	Minister for Foreign Affairs (Utanríkisráðherra)	Ministry for Foreign Affairs (Utanríkisráðuneytið)	PP
Halldór Blöndal	Minister of Communications (Samgönguráðherra)	Ministry of Communications (Samgönguráðuneytið)	IP
Ingibjörg Pálmadóttir	Minister of Health and Social Security (Heilbrigðis- og tryggingamálaráðherra)	Ministry of Health and Social Security (Heilbrigðis- og tryggingamálaráðuneytið)	PP
Páll Bragi Pétursson	Minister of Social Affairs (Félagsmálaráðherra)	Ministry of Social Affairs (Félagsmálaráðuneytið)	PP
Þorsteinn Pálsson	Minister of Fisheries (Sjávarútvegsráðherra)	Ministry of Fisheries (Sjávarútvegsráðuneytið)	IP
Þorsteinn Pálsson	Minister of Justice and Ecclesiastical Affairs (Dóms- og kirkjumálaráðherra)	Ministry of Justice and Ecclesiastical Affairs (Dóms- og kirkjumálaráðuneytið)	IP

=== First reshuffle: 16 April 1998 – 11 May 1999 ===
Geir Haarde replaced Friðrik Klemenz Sophusson as Minister of Finance.

Incumbent	Minister	Ministry	Party
Davíð Oddsson	Prime Minister (Forsætisráðherra)	Prime Minister's Office (Forsætisráðuneytið)	IP
Davíð Oddsson	Minister of Statistics Iceland (Ráðherra Hagstofu Íslands)	Statistics Iceland (Hagstofa Íslands)	IP
Björn Bjarnason	Minister of Education, Science and Culture (Menntamálaráðherra)	Ministry of Education, Science and Culture (Menntamálaráðuneytið)	IP
Finnur Ingólfsson	Minister of Commerce (Viðskiptaráðherra)	Ministry of Commerce (Viðskiptaráðuneytið)	PP
Finnur Ingólfsson	Minister of Industry (Iðnaðarráðherra)	Ministry of Industry (Iðnaðarráðuneytið)	PP
Geir Haarde	Minister of Finance (Fjármálaráðherra)	Ministry of Finance (Fjármálaráðuneytið)	IP
Guðmundur Kristján Bjarnason	Minister for the Environment (Umhverfisráðherra)	Ministry for the Environment (Umhverfisráðuneytið)	PP
Guðmundur Kristján Bjarnason	Minister of Agriculture (Landbúnaðarráðherra)	Ministry of Agriculture (Landbúnaðarráðuneytið)	PP
Halldór Ásgrímsson	Minister for Foreign Affairs (Utanríkisráðherra)	Ministry for Foreign Affairs (Utanríkisráðuneytið)	PP
Halldór Blöndal	Minister of Communications (Samgönguráðherra)	Ministry of Communications (Samgönguráðuneytið)	IP
Ingibjörg Pálmadóttir	Minister of Health and Social Security (Heilbrigðis- og tryggingamálaráðherra)	Ministry of Health and Social Security (Heilbrigðis- og tryggingamálaráðuneytið)	PP
Páll Bragi Pétursson	Minister of Social Affairs (Félagsmálaráðherra)	Ministry of Social Affairs (Félagsmálaráðuneytið)	PP
Þorsteinn Pálsson	Minister of Fisheries (Sjávarútvegsráðherra)	Ministry of Fisheries (Sjávarútvegsráðuneytið)	IP
Þorsteinn Pálsson	Minister of Justice and Ecclesiastical Affairs (Dóms- og kirkjumálaráðherra)	Ministry of Justice and Ecclesiastical Affairs (Dóms- og kirkjumálaráðuneytið)	IP

=== Second reshuffle: 11 May 1999 – 28 May 1999 ===
Davíð Oddsson replaced Þorsteinn Pálsson as Minister of Fisheries and Minister of Justice and Ecclesiastical Affairs. Halldór Ásgrímsson replaced Guðmundur Kristján Bjarnason as Minister for the Environment and Minister of Agriculture.

Incumbent	Minister	Ministry	Party
Davíð Oddsson	Prime Minister (Forsætisráðherra)	Prime Minister's Office (Forsætisráðuneytið)	IP
Davíð Oddsson	Minister of Fisheries (Sjávarútvegsráðherra)	Ministry of Fisheries (Sjávarútvegsráðuneytið)	IP
Davíð Oddsson	Minister of Justice and Ecclesiastical Affairs (Dóms- og kirkjumálaráðherra)	Ministry of Justice and Ecclesiastical Affairs (Dóms- og kirkjumálaráðuneytið)	IP
Davíð Oddsson	Minister of Statistics Iceland (Ráðherra Hagstofu Íslands)	Statistics Iceland (Hagstofa Íslands)	IP
Björn Bjarnason	Minister of Education, Science and Culture (Menntamálaráðherra)	Ministry of Education, Science and Culture (Menntamálaráðuneytið)	IP
Finnur Ingólfsson	Minister of Commerce (Viðskiptaráðherra)	Ministry of Commerce (Viðskiptaráðuneytið)	PP
Finnur Ingólfsson	Minister of Industry (Iðnaðarráðherra)	Ministry of Industry (Iðnaðarráðuneytið)	PP
Geir Haarde	Minister of Finance (Fjármálaráðherra)	Ministry of Finance (Fjármálaráðuneytið)	IP
Halldór Ásgrímsson	Minister for Foreign Affairs (Utanríkisráðherra)	Ministry for Foreign Affairs (Utanríkisráðuneytið)	PP
Halldór Ásgrímsson	Minister for the Environment (Umhverfisráðherra)	Ministry for the Environment (Umhverfisráðuneytið)	PP
Halldór Ásgrímsson	Minister of Agriculture (Landbúnaðarráðherra)	Ministry of Agriculture (Landbúnaðarráðuneytið)	PP
Halldór Blöndal	Minister of Communications (Samgönguráðherra)	Ministry of Communications (Samgönguráðuneytið)	IP
Ingibjörg Pálmadóttir	Minister of Health and Social Security (Heilbrigðis- og tryggingamálaráðherra)	Ministry of Health and Social Security (Heilbrigðis- og tryggingamálaráðuneytið)	PP
Páll Bragi Pétursson	Minister of Social Affairs (Félagsmálaráðherra)	Ministry of Social Affairs (Félagsmálaráðuneytið)	PP

== See also ==
- Government of Iceland
- Cabinet of Iceland
