= Árni Steinar Jóhannsson =

Icelandic politician (1953–2015)

Árni Steinar Jóhannsson (ÁSJ)

Fourth Deputy Speaker of the Althing
- In office 8 June 1999 – 10 May 2003
- Preceded by: Guðmundur Árni Stefánsson
- Succeeded by: Jóhanna Sigurðardóttir

Member of the Althing
- In office 8 May 1999 – 10 May 2003
- Constituency: Northeastern

Personal details
- Born: 12 June 1953 Dalvík, Iceland
- Died: 1 November 2015 (aged 62) Dalvík, Iceland
- Party: Left-Green Movement

Árni Steinar Jóhannsson (12 June 1953 – 1 November 2015) was an Icelandic politician and member of the Althing. A member of the Left-Green Movement, he represented the Northeastern constituency from May 1999 to May 2003.

Árni was born on 12 June 1953 in Dalvík. He was the son of fisherman Jóhann Helgason and shopkeeper Valrós Árnadóttir. His father was amongst several sailors who were killed during a severe blizzard off northern Iceland on 9 April 1963. Árni was the first cousin of Althing member Sigríður Anna Þórðardóttir. After obtaining a general education diploma in Dalvík in 1969, Árni moved to the US to study at the Memorial High School in Eau Claire, Wisconsin. He then studied at an agricultural college (1971–1974) and at the Royal Veterinary and Agricultural University in Copenhagen (1974–1979). He was a Horticultural Director (1979–1986) and Environmental Director (1986–1999) for the municipality of Akureyri.

Árni was substitute member of the Althing for Steingrímur J. Sigfússon in November 1996 and from October 1998 to November 1998, and for Jón Bjarnason from October 2003 to November 2003 and in October 2006. He was elected to the Althing at the 1999 parliamentary election. He was Fourth Deputy Speaker of the Althing from June 1999 to May 2003.

After leaving the Althing, Árni was the Environmental Director for the municipality of Fjarðabyggð until his death. He was on the board of energy company RARIK from 2008 to 2014 and served as its chairman from 2009 to 20141. He died on 1 November 2015 at a nursing home in Dalvík due to cancer. He never married and had no children.

Electoral history of Árni Steinar Jóhannsson
Election	Constituency	Party	Votes	Result
1991 parliamentary	Northwestern	National Party		Not elected
1991 parliamentary	Northeastern	National Party and Humanist Party		Not elected
1995 parliamentary	Northeastern	People's Alliance	2,726	Not elected
1999 parliamentary	Northeastern	Left-Green Movement	3,476	Elected
2003 parliamentary	Northwest	Left-Green Movement	1,326.7	Not elected
