= Bakkafjörður =

- Village
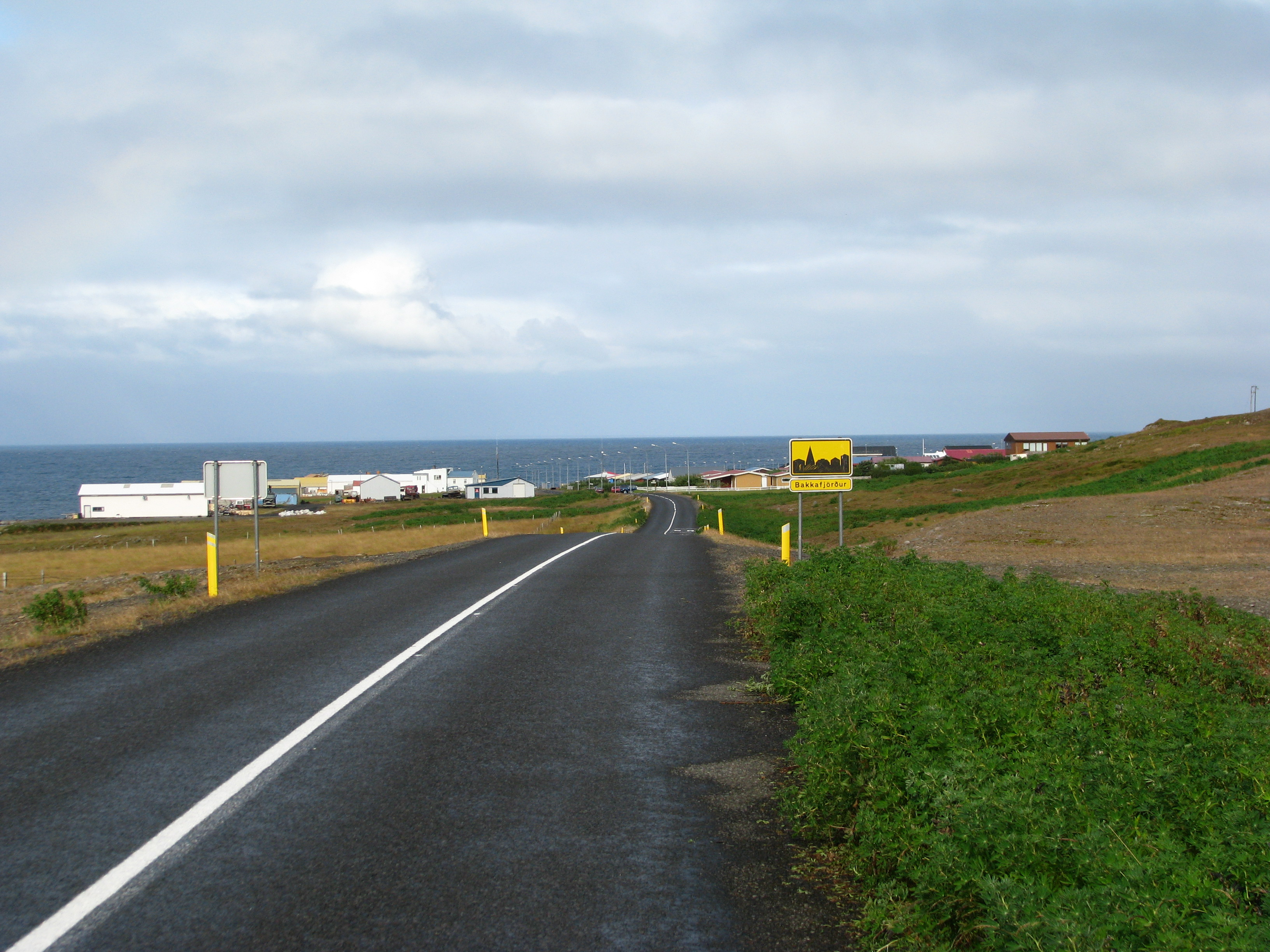
- Bakkafjörður, Sept 2008

- Location of the Municipality of Langanesbyggð

- Location of Bakkafjörður in Iceland
- Coordinates: 66°02′N 14°48′W
- Country: Iceland
- Constituency: Northeast Constituency
- Region: Northeastern Region
- Municipality: Langanesbyggð

Population (January 2011)
  - Total: 72
- Time zone: UTC+0 (GMT)
- Post Code: 685
- Website: Official website

Bakkafjörður (Icelandic pronunciation: [ˈpahkaˌfjœrðʏr̥]) is a small fishing village in North-East Iceland, located in a fjord with the same name.

The village has 65 inhabitants and is part of the regional service center of Langanesbyggð district in Northeastern Region.

== History ==
Hróðgeir hvíti Hrappsson was the first to occupy Sandvík. He lived near Skeggjastaðir and Sandvík, which is now called Bakkafjörður but Sandvíkurheiði (between Bakkafjörður and Vopnafjörður), still bears the ancient name.

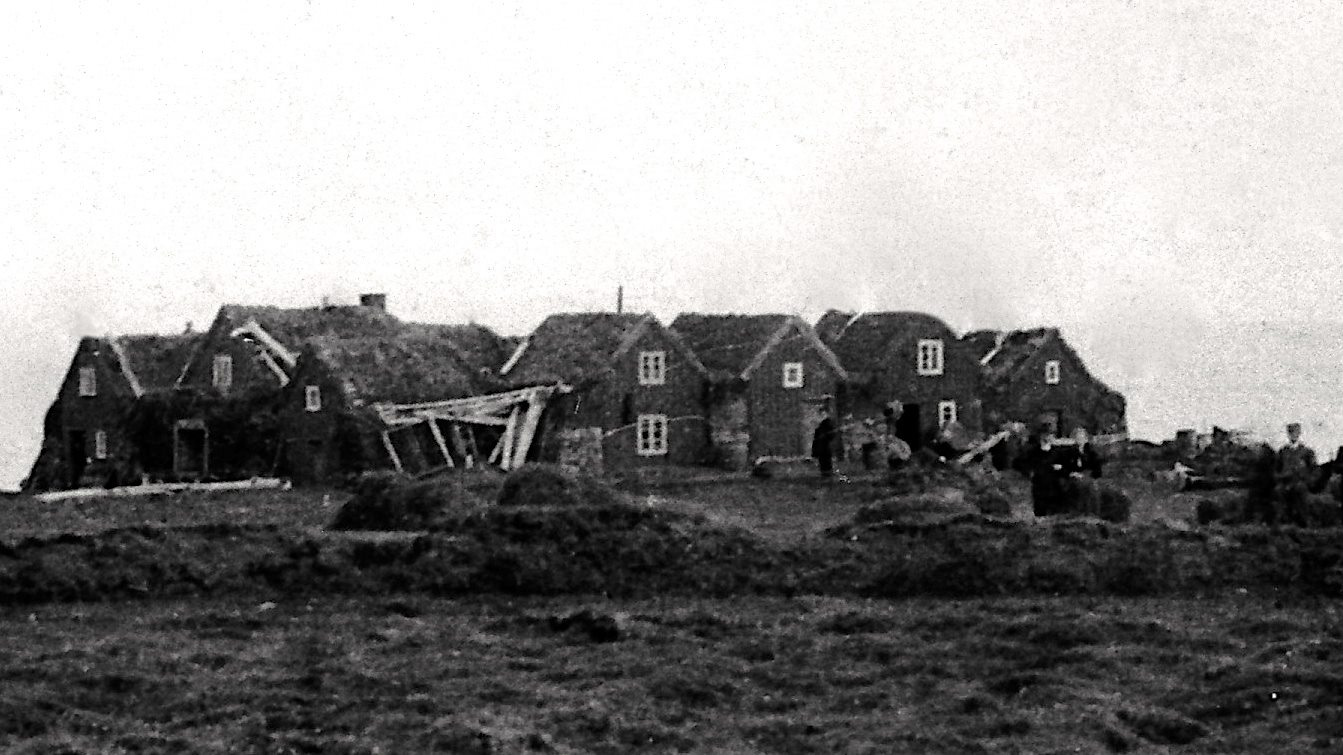
Höfn, built in the 1800s

The largest farm at Sandvík was likely Höfn. Built in the 1800s somewhere in modern day Bakkafjördur. Later on, more houses were built on Hafnartangi. Most of these original houses were demolished except for one.

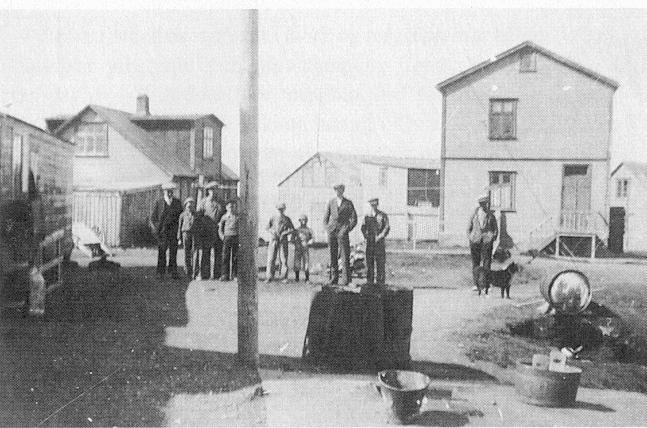
Hafnartangi in the early 20th century.

Halldórsshús was built in 1900. It was owned by Halldór, who ran his shop until his death in 1920. His trading house is still stands on the tang and is often referred to as the merchant's house or Halldórshús.

In Höfn, the port facilities were poor, despite the name, but boats lay by clapping at Hafnartangi and the catch was pulled (or carried up) ashore, directly to the house. In the early 1900s, around the trade and fish receptions that had then begun to form so-called grass farms in Hafnar's land with a small stock, a few cows and sheep, but most of those who lived on them also engaged to some extent in fishing. The main grass farms include Steinholt, Lindarbrekku, Bjarg and Bergholt. Some of these farms are still standing in some form and even inhabited in some houses, though not with animals.

After Halldórs death, Jakob Gunnlaugsson's Store in Copenhagen established a branch in Bakkafjörður, as Halldór had had a main business dealings with that company.

The first telephone of the town came between Vopnafjörður and Bakkafjörður in 1916. (A rural telephone later came in 1954.) In 1933 work began on the so-called Bakkafjörður road, a road around the countryside. In 1949, a road connection was finally established between Bakkafjörður and Þórshöfn over Brekknaheiði, after many years of work. Funds were first granted for the road in 1936, but construction did not begin in full until 1943. With the road, Langanesströnd and Bakkafjörður were connected to the country's road network for the first time. A road over Sandvíkurheiði between Bakkafjörður and Vopnafjörður was built in 1955–1960.

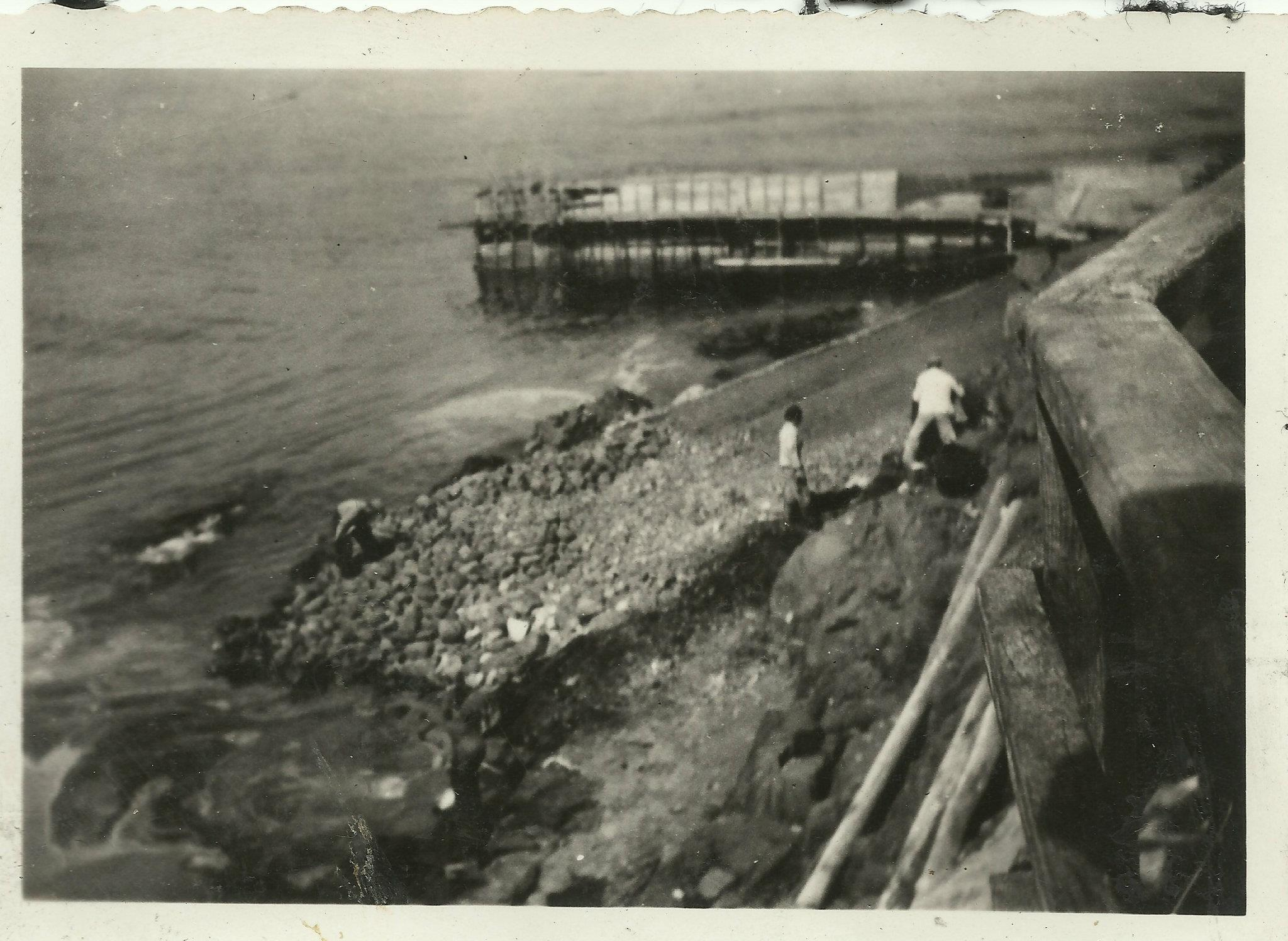
Construction of the harbour wall

Around 1945, the construction of a harbour pier on Bakkafjörður began, for the first time. Casting was done on top of the skerry rocks, which were cut just below the Hafnartang, and there a pier was created with a small wall. It was later lengthened around 1970 with the help of the Icelandic Coast Guard. A major problem at the port was that the fishermen were not allowed to use the port crane to hoist the fish out of the boats. Because of this, most of the fishermen would use small crates or simply throw the fish onto a trailer.

A small airport was built not far from the village. However, it did not come with a hangar, and funding for it from the public sector was repeatedly postponed. More often than not, the locals took matters into their own hands. In 1979, the municipality bought one of the so-called emergency fund houses; it was moved east and used as a hangar. This would have been unique as the hangar was built without the involvement of the Civil Aviation Authority. This hangar was in use throughout the life of the airport. In the end the airport was closed around the early 2000s.

== Sights ==
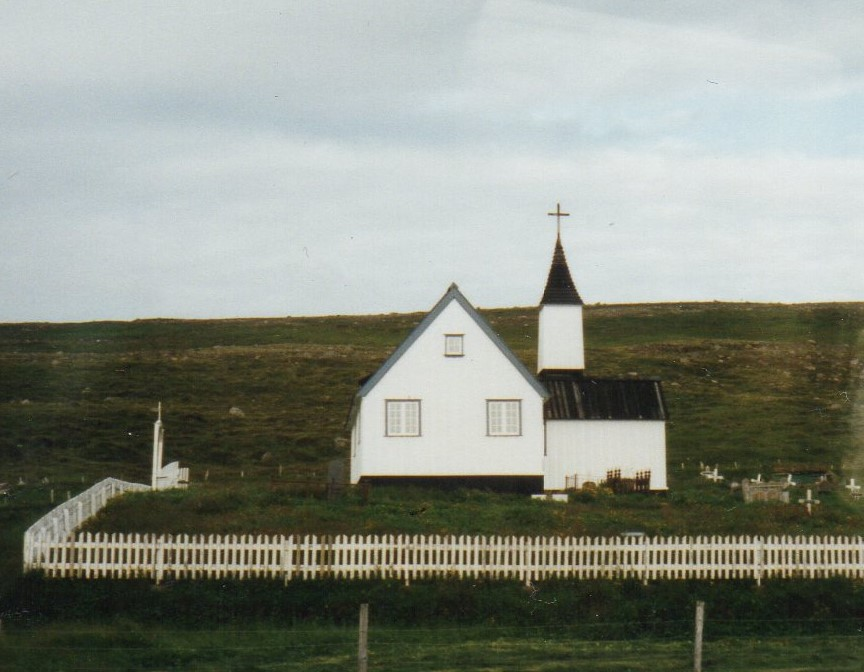
Church at Skeggjastaðir, the oldest church in eastern Iceland

Skeggjastaðakirkja is the oldest church in eastern Iceland can be visited at Skeggjastaðir, a farm on the main road close to Bakkafjörður. The wooden church which was built in 1845 seats about 100 persons, and it was renovated in its authentic style from 1961 to 1962 and reopened on 16 September 1962. The pulprit and the interior were made of driftwood. The altar painting dates from 1857. The small tower with three old bells were added in 1962. Legend has it that there has always been a church dedicated to Saint Thorlákur here since the Christianization of Iceland in 1000. Permission to view the church must be obtained at Skeggjastaðir, however requests are rarely turned down.

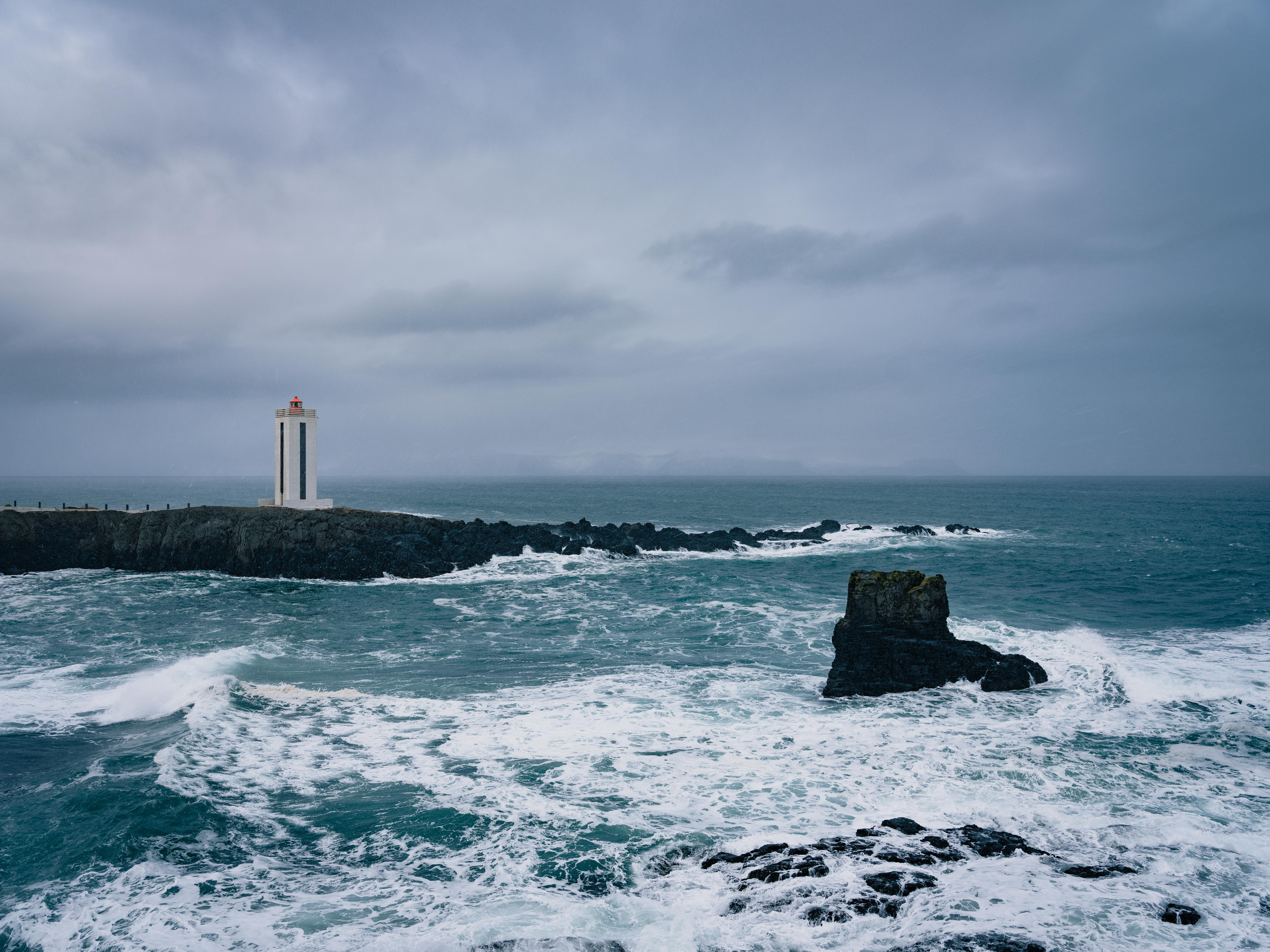
Digranes lighthouse, north of Bakkafjörður

Digranes lighthouse was built in 1943–1947 and is 18,4 m tall. From Digranes, the view over Bakkaflói is like no other.
