= List of speakers of the Upper House of the Althing (Iceland) =

Speakers of the Upper House of the Althing.

Name	Period
Pétur Pétursson	1875–1881
Bergur Thorberg	1881–1882
Pétur Pétursson	1882–1886
Ární Thorsteinsson	1886–1889
Benedikt Kristjánsson	1889–1893
Árni Thorsteinsson	1893–1905
Júliús Havsteen	1905–1909
Kristján Jónsson	1909–1911
Jens Pálsson	1911–1912
Júlíus Havsteen	1912–1913
Stefán Stefánsson	1913–1916
Guðmundur Björnsson	1916–1923
Halldór Steinsson	1923–1928
Guðmundur Ólafsson	1928–1933
Eínar Árnason	1933–1942
Jóhann Þ Jósefsson	1942
Steingrímur Aðalsteinsson	1942–1946
Þorsteinn Þorsteinsson	1946–1947
Bernharð Stefánsson	1947–1953
Gísli Jónsson	1953–1956
Bernharð Stefánsson	1956–1959
Eggert G. Þorsteinsson	1959
Sigurður Ó. Ólafsson	1959–1967
Jónas G. Rafnar	1967–1971
Björn Jónsson	1971–1973
Ásgeir Bjarnason	1973–1974
Þorvaldur Garðar Kristjánsson	1974–1978
Bragi Sigurjónsson	1978 – 4 December 1978
Þorvaldur Garðar Kristjánsson	4 December 1978 – 1979
Helgi Seljan	1979–1983
Salome Þorkelsdóttir	1983–1987
Karl Steinar Guðnason	1987–1988
Jón Helgason	1988–1991

In 1991, the Althing became unicameral.

== Sources ==
- The official website of the Althing
