= Steingrímur J. Sigfússon =

Icelandic politician (born 1955)

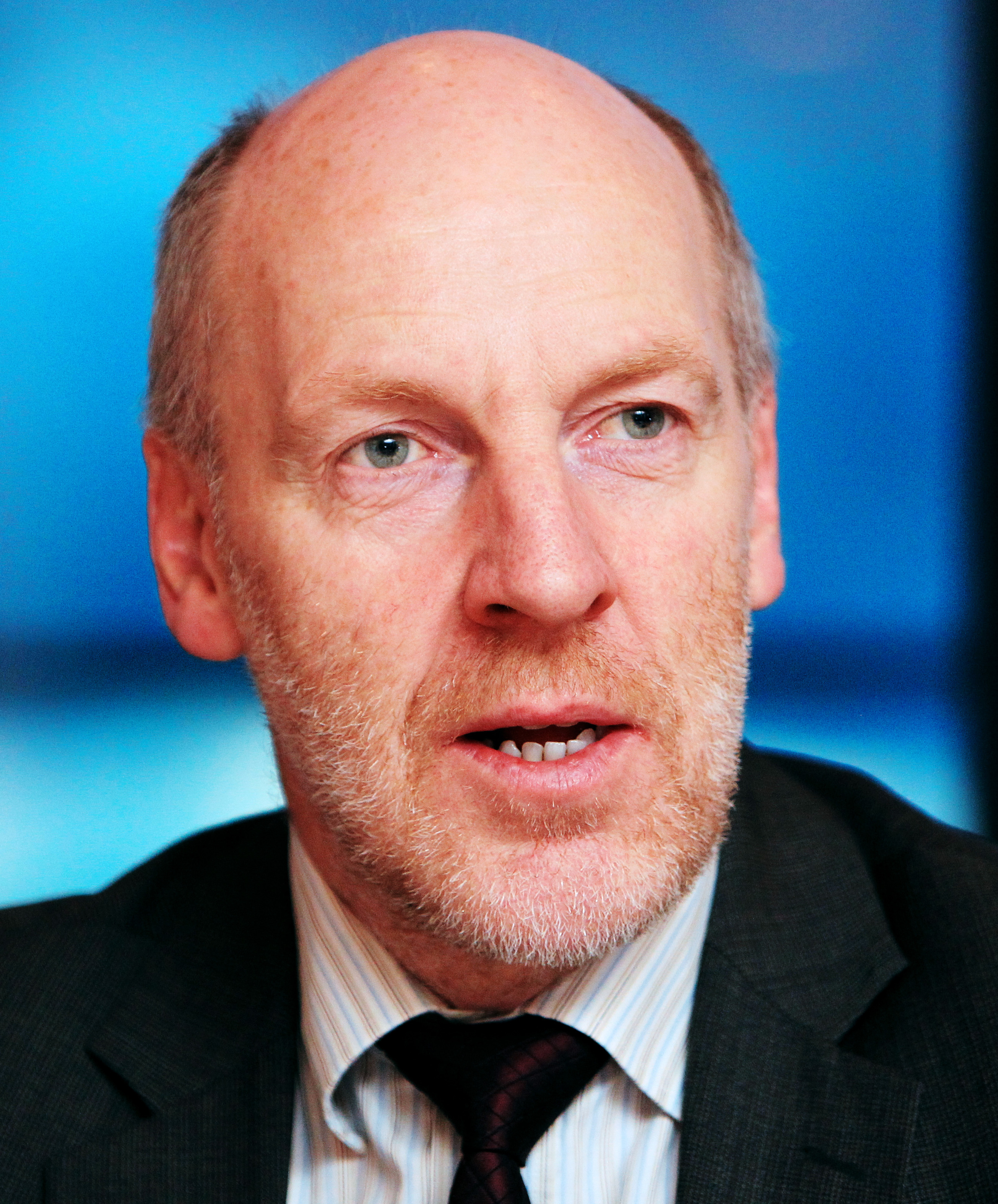

Speaker of the Althing
- In office 29 October 2017 – 25. September 2021
- President: Guðni Th. Jóhannesson
- Prime Minister: Bjarni Benediktsson; Katrín Jakobsdóttir
- Preceded by: Unnur Brá Konráðsdóttir
- Succeeded by: Birgir Ármannsson
- In office 29 October 2016 – 24 January 2017
- President: Guðni Th. Jóhannesson
- Prime Minister: Sigurður Ingi Jóhannsson; Bjarni Benediktsson
- Preceded by: Einar Kristinn Guðfinnsson
- Succeeded by: Unnur Brá Konráðsdóttir

Minister of Finance
- In office 1 February 2009 – 2011
- Prime Minister: Jóhanna Sigurðardóttir
- Preceded by: Árni Mathiesen
- Succeeded by: Oddný G. Harðardóttir

Minister of Fisheries and Agriculture
- In office 1 February 2009 – 10 May 2009
- Prime Minister: Jóhanna Sigurðardóttir
- Preceded by: Einar Kristinn Guðfinnsson
- Succeeded by: Jón Bjarnason
- In office 1 January 2012 – 23 May 2013
- Prime Minister: Jóhanna Sigurðardóttir
- Preceded by: Jón Bjarnason
- Succeeded by: Sigurður Ingi Jóhannsson

Minister of Agriculture and Communications
- In office 28 September 1988 – 30 April 1991
- Prime Minister: Steingrímur Hermannsson
- Preceded by: Jón Helgason (as Minister of Agriculture); Mattías Á. Mathiesen (as Minister of Communications)
- Succeeded by: Halldór Blöndal

Personal details
- Born: 4 August 1955 (age 71) Gunnarsstaðir, Þistilfjörður, Iceland
- Party: Left-Green Movement
- Other political affiliations: People's Alliance
- Spouse: Bergný Marvinsdóttir
- Children: 4
- Education: University of Iceland
- Profession: Geologist

Steingrímur Jóhann Sigfússon (born 4 August 1955) is an Icelandic politician. He has been a member of the Althing (Icelandic parliament) since 1983 and was the founding chairman of the Left-Green Movement (Vinstri hreyfingin – grænt framboð) from 1999 until 2013. He was the Minister for Agriculture and Communications from 1988 to 1991. He was Minister of Finance from 2009 to 2011. In 2011, he took on the roles of Minister of Fisheries and Agriculture and Minister of Economic Affairs. He was first elected as a member of the People's Alliance and helped found the Left-Green Movement after the merger of the People's Alliance into the more moderate Social Democratic Alliance.

Steingrímur was born in Gunnarsstaðir, a large sheep farm between Garður and Þórshöfn in the Þistilfjörður region of northeast Iceland (Svalbarðshreppur municipality). In his younger days he was an avid sportsman, both track and field and also a volleyball player. On 16 January 2006, Steingrímur was injured in a car accident not far from Blönduós but later recovered.

He supported the end of the US military presence in Iceland, but believed Iceland itself should have taken the initiative in ending this presence. Since September 2006, when US forces left Naval Air Station Keflavik, he has strongly opposed any possible development of an Icelandic army seeing the country's need for armed forces as practically non-existent. He believes that civilian institutions such as the police and the coast guard should be organized in order to provide the needed protection in the unlikely event of a major disturbance.

In November 2006, he published the book Við öll – Íslenskt velferðarsamfélag á tímamótum ("All of Us – Icelandic Welfare Society at Crossroads"), laying out his political ideology.

Political offices
Preceded by Árni Mathiesen	Minister of Finance; 2009 – 2011	Succeeded by Oddný G. Harðardóttir
Preceded by Einar Kristinn Guðfinnsson	Minister of Fisheries and Agriculture; 2009 – 2013	Succeeded by Sigurður Ingi Jóhannsson
Preceded by Jón Helgason	Minister of Agriculture; 1988 – 1991	Succeeded by Halldór Blöndal
Preceded by Matthías Árni Mathiesen	Minister of Communications; 1988 – 1991	Succeeded by Halldór Blöndal
Preceded by Einar Kristinn Guðfinnsson	Speaker of the Althing; 2016 – 2017	Succeeded by Unnur Brá Konráðsdóttir
Preceded by None	Chairman of the Left-Green Movement; 1999 – 2013	Succeeded by Katrín Jakobsdóttir
