= Sigurjónsson =

Sigurjónsson is an Icelandic patronymic meaning "son of Sigurjón". In Icelandic names, it is not a family name. Some Icelanders abroad use the anglicised version Sigurjonsson as a surname. Notable people with the name include:

- Bragi Sigurjónsson (1910–1995), Icelandic politician and former minister
- Frosti Sigurjónsson (born 1962), Icelandic businessman and politician
- Gordon Sigurjonsson (1883–1967), Icelandic athlete and trainer
- Guðmundur Sigurjónsson (born 1947), Icelandic chess grandmaster
- Guðmundur Ari Sigurjónsson (born 1988), Icelandic politician
- Jóhann Sigurjónsson (1880–1919), Icelandic playwright and poet
- John Snorri Sigurjónsson (1973–2021), Icelandic high-altitude mountaineer
- Oliver Sigurjónsson (born 1995), Icelandic football midfielder,
- Rúnar Már Sigurjónsson (born 1990), Icelandic professional footballer
- Sigurður Sigurjónsson (born 1955), AKA Siggi Sigurjóns, Icelandic actor, comedian and screenwriter

== See also ==
- Sigurð Joensen
- Sigurd Jonsson
