= List of speakers of the Parliament of Iceland =

This is a list of speakers of the Althing, the Icelandic parliament.

The Speaker of the Althing (Icelandic: Forseti Alþingis, literally the President of the Althing) is the presiding officer (speaker) of that legislature.

== Speakers of the United Althing (1875–1991) ==
Name	Period
Jón Sigurðsson	1875-1877
Pétur Pétursson	1879
Bergur Thorberg	1881
Magnús Stephensen	1883
Árni Thorsteinson	1885
Benedikt Sveinsson	1886-1887
Benedikt Kristjánsson	1889
Eiríkur Briem	1891
Benedikt Sveinsson	1893-1894
Ólafur Briem	1895
Hallgrímur Sveinsson	1897-1899
Eiríkur Briem	1901-1907
Björn Jónsson	1909
Skúli Thoroddsen	1909-1911
Hannes Hafstein	1912
Jón Magnússon	1912-1913
Kristinn Daníelsson	1914-1917
Jóhannes Jóhannesson	1918-1921
Sigurður Eggerz	1922
Magnús Kristjánsson	1922-1923
Jóhannes Jóhannesson	1924-1926
Magnús Torfason	1927-1929
Ásgeir Ásgeirsson	1930-1931
Einar Árnason	1931-1932
Tryggvi Þórhallsson	1933
Jón Baldvinsson	1933-1938
Haraldur Guðmundsson	1938-1941
Gísli Sveinsson	1942
Haraldur Guðmundsson	1942-1943
Gísli Sveinsson	1943-1945
Jón Pálmason	1945-1949
Steingrímur Steinþórsson	1949-1950
Jón Pálmason	1950-1953
Jörundur Brynjólfsson	1953-1956
Emil Jónsson	1956-1958
Jón Pálmason	1959
Bjarni Benediktsson	1959
Friðjón Skarphéðinsson	1959-1963
Birgir Finnsson	1963-1971
Eysteinn Jónsson	1971-1974
Gylfi Þorsteinsson Gíslason	1974
Ásgeir Bjarnason	1974-1978
Gils Guðmundsson	1978-1979
Oddur Ólafsson	1979
Jón Helgason	1979-1983
Þorvaldur Garðar Kristjánsson	1983-1988
Guðrún Helgadóttir	1988-1991
Salome Þorkelsdóttir	1991

== Speakers of the unicameral Althing (1991–) ==
Name	Period	Party
Salome Þorkelsdóttir	1991 – 1995	Independence Party
Ólafur Garðar Einarsson	1995 – 1999	Independence Party
Halldór Blöndal	1999 – 2005	Independence Party
Sólveig Pétursdóttir	2005 – 2007	Independence Party
Sturla Böðvarsson	2007 – 2009	Independence Party
Guðbjartur Hannesson	2009	Social Democratic Alliance
Ásta Jóhannesdóttir	2009 – 2013	Social Democratic Alliance
Einar Kristinn Guðfinnsson	2013 – 2016	Independence Party
Steingrímur J. Sigfússon	2016 – 2017	The Left-Green Movement
Unnur Brá Konráðsdóttir	2017*	Independence Party
Steingrímur J. Sigfússon	2017 – 2021	The Left-Green Movement
Birgir Ármannsson	2021 – 2024	Independence Party
Þórunn Sveinbjarnardóttir	2024 –	Social Democratic Alliance
