= Salome Þorkelsdóttir =

Icelandic politician

- Born: 3 July 1927 (age 98); Reykjavík, Iceland
- Other name: Salome Thorkelsdottir
- Occupation: Politician
- Years active: 1966-1995
- Known for: First Woman Speaker of unicameral Alþingi
- Spouse: Jóel Kristinn Jóelsson (married on 22 February 1947)

Salome Þorkelsdóttir, sometimes transliterated as Salome Thorkelsdottir, (born 3 July 1927) is a retired Icelandic politician and first woman to be Speaker of the unicameral Althing. Before that she had been Speaker of the Upper House of the Althing. She was of the Independence Party.

== Biography ==
Salome Þorkelsdóttir was born on 3 July 1927, in Reykjavík, Iceland to Þorkell Sigurðsson and Anna Þorbjörg Sigurðardóttir. She attended the Reykjavik Women's Gymnasium graduating in 1945. In 1947, she married Jóel Kristinn Jóelsson (2 January 1921 – 16 June 2007) and subsequently, they had three children.

After raising her children, Salome served on the council of the Mosfellshrepps (Moss District) from 1966-1982. During this same period, she served as Chairwoman of the Federation of Municipalities in Reykjanesbær from 1975 to 1979 and was Chairwoman of the Independence Party's Representatives for the County of Kjósarsýsla (which is now Reykjavík) between 1972 and 1980. She was elected to the Alþingi as a Member of Parliament representing Reyknesinga in 1979 and served until 1983, when she was re-elected as an Independence Party candidate. With her reelection in 1983, she became Speaker of the Upper House of the Althing.

She served as the first Vice President of the United Assembly from 1988 to 1991 and in 1991, Salome became the first woman to be Speaker of the unicameral Althing, serving in that capacity until 1995. During her time as speaker, she oversaw discussions concerning the formalization of the European Union in 1993 as well as the reorganization and procedural realignments of the Alþingi.
