= Árni Gunnarsson =

Icelandic journalist and politician (1940–2022)

Personal details
- Born: 14 April 1940; Ísafjörður, Kingdom of Iceland
- Died: 1 July 2022 (aged 82)
- Political party: Social Democratic Party
- Spouse: Hrefna Filippusdóttir
- Children: 2
- Occupation: Journalist; politician

Árni Gunnarsson (14 April 1940 – 1 July 2022) was an Icelandic journalist and politician. He was a journalist at Alþýðublaðið and later a news director from 1959 to 1965. He was also a journalist and news director at Ríkisútvarpið and Vísir from 1965 to 1976. He was a reporter for Ríkisútvarpið when the eruption began on Heimaey in January 1973 and later wrote the book Eldgos í Eyjar. In 1978, he was elected a Member of Alþingi for Northeastern Region for the Social Democratic Party where he had a seat intermittently until 1991. He was then President of the Lower House in 1979 and from 1989 to 1991.

== Personal life ==
Árni was born in Ísafjörður to Gunnar Stefánsson, a representative of the State Travel Agency, and Ásta Árnadóttir, a housewife. Árni was married to Hrefna Filippusdóttir with whom he had two daughters.
