= Jóhannes Jóhannesson =

Icelandic politician (1866 - 1950)

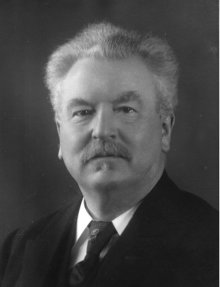

Speaker of the Althing
- In office 1918–1921
- Appointed by: Christian X of Denmark
- Preceded by: Kristinn Daníelsson
- Succeeded by: Sigurður Eggerz
- In office 1924–1926
- Appointed by: Christian X of Denmark
- Preceded by: Magnús Kristjánsson
- Succeeded by: Magnús Torfason

Personal details
- Born: 17 January 1866 Hjarðarholti, Stafholtstungum
- Died: 7 February 1950 (aged 84) Reykjavík
- Resting place: Hólavallakirkjugarður
- Spouse: Jósefína Antonía Lárusdóttir Blöndal
- Children: Lárus Jóhannesson
- Education: University of Copenhagen (Hafnarskóli)
- Profession: Lawyer

Jóhannes Jóhannesson (17 January 1866 – 7 February 1950) was an Icelandic politician and speaker of Althing. He was a member of the Althing in 1900–1901, 1903–1913, and 1916–1931.

On 25 August 1907 Jóhannes inaugurated the first submarine cable between Iceland and Europe, and sent the first telegraph after minister Hannes Hafstein was delayed due to bad weather out at sea.

Between the years of 1897-1918 he served as county sheriff for Seyðisfjörður, and from 1918-1928 he served as county sheriff for the city of Reykjavík until the role was dissolved.

Jóhannes served as chairman for the Icelandic side of the committee on the act of the Union with Denmark, which secured the sovereignty of Iceland from Danish rule.

In 1920 he was appointed a member of the first committee of the Fálkaorða receiving the stórriddarakross for his role as county sheriff in 1921.

== Photos ==
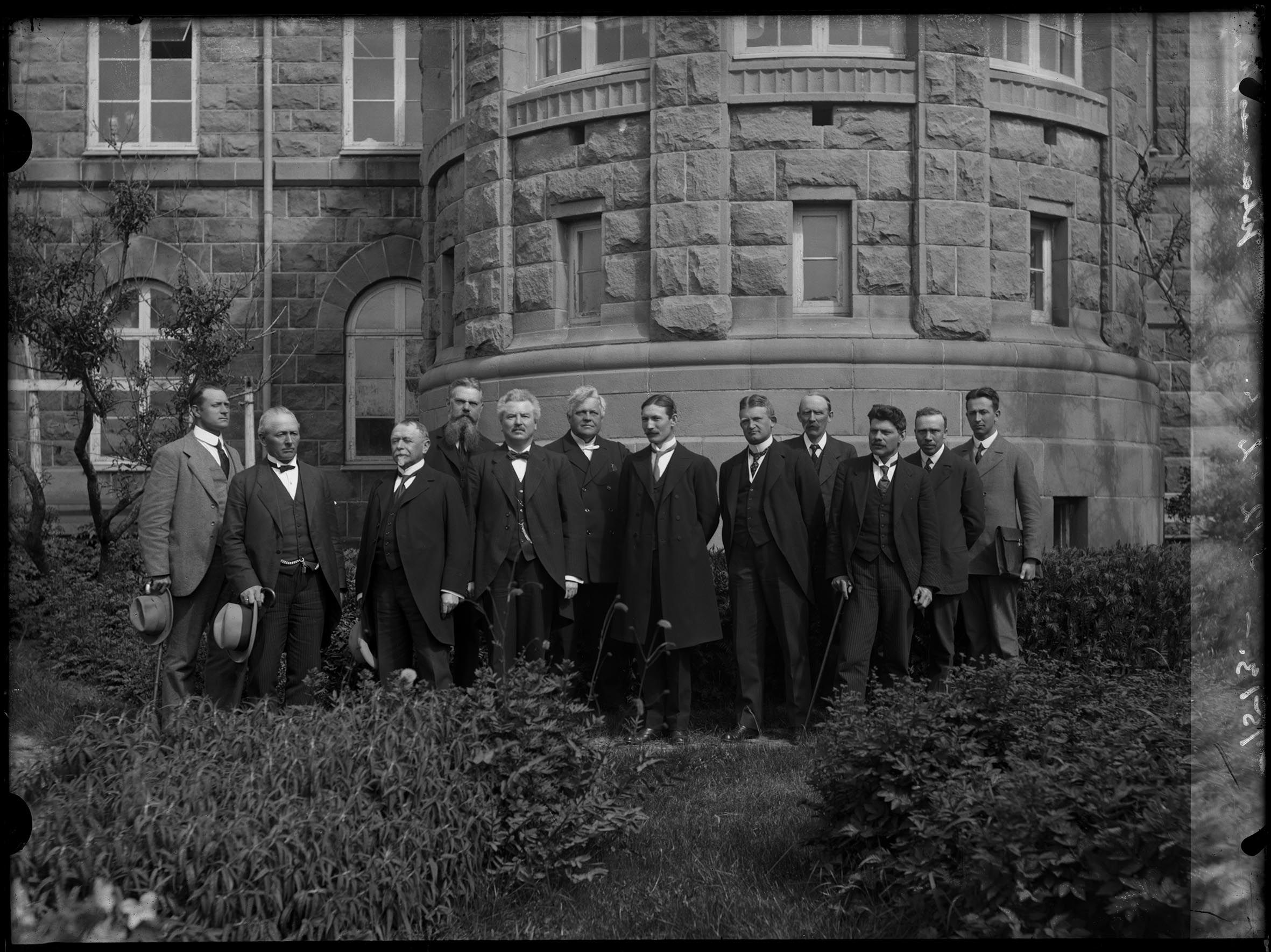
Sambandslaganefndin in front of Alþingishúsið in Reykjavík

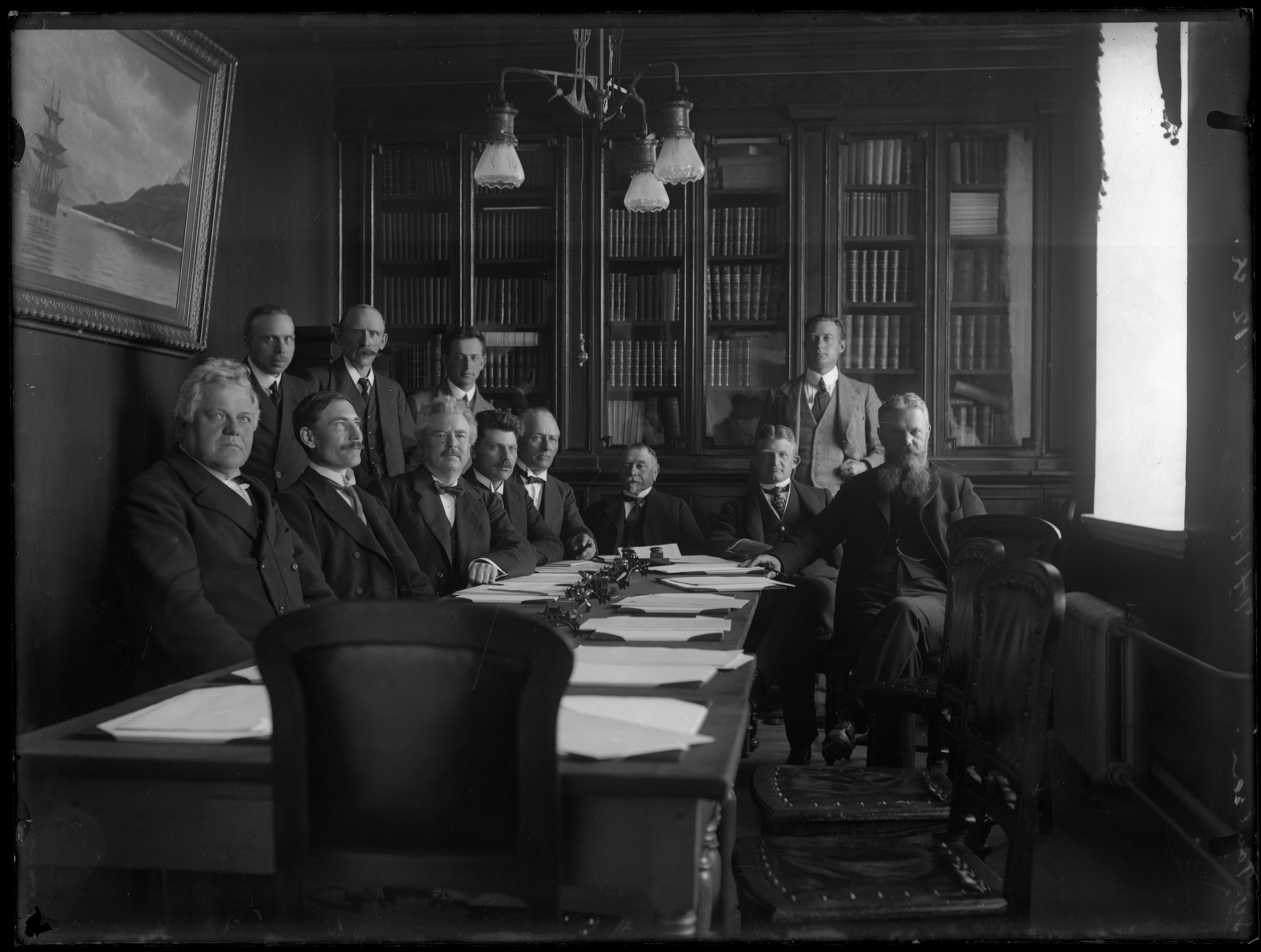

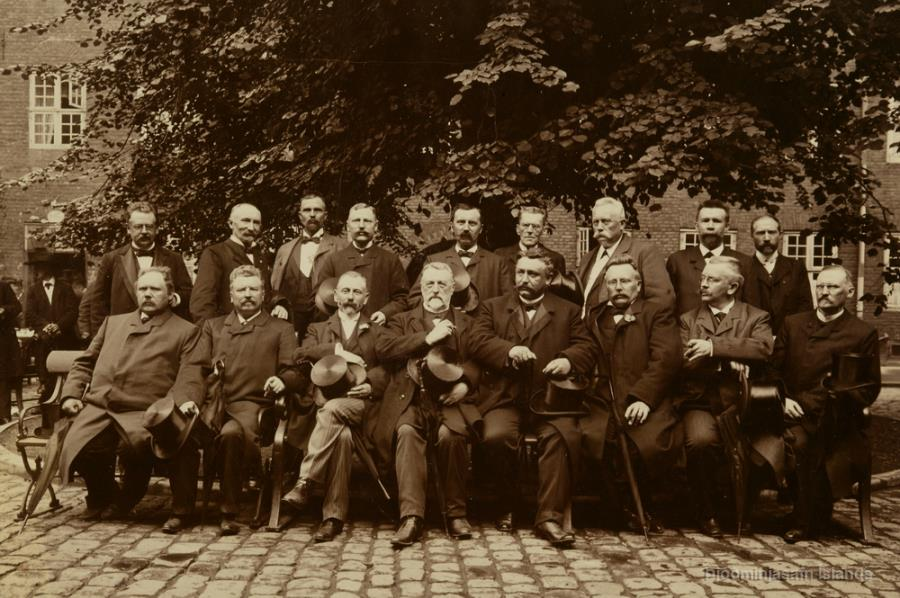
Jóhannes (second to the left, bottom row) alongside other members of Alþingi in Copenhagen in 1906
