= Association for Justice and Equality =

Defunct political party in Iceland

The Association for Justice and Equality (Icelandic: Samtök um jafnrétti og félagshyggju) was a political party in Iceland.

== History ==
The party was formed by Stefán Valgeirsson as a breakaway from the Progressive Party. It contested the 1987 parliamentary elections in the Northeastern constituency. Although it received only 1,893 votes (1.2%), it won a single seat in the Althing, taken by Valgeirsson.
