= Þistilfjörður =

Fjord in Iceland

Coordinates: 66.35°N 15.48°W

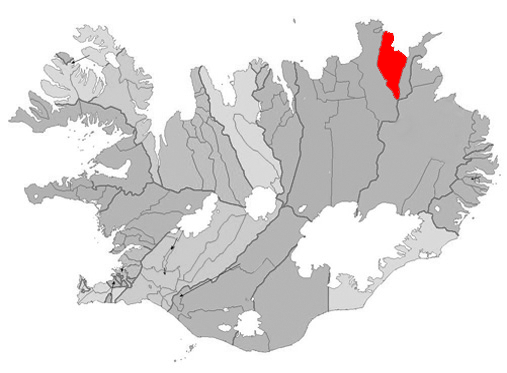
Location of Svalbarðshreppur in Iceland, the area also known as Þistilfjörður. The bay itself is immediately to the northeast.

Þistilfjörður (Icelandic pronunciation: [ˈθɪstɪlˌfjœrðʏr̥]; sometimes anglicised as Thistilfjördur) is a bay in northeast Iceland, between the Rifstangi and Langanes peninsulas, near the town of Þórshöfn (Thorshofn). The name also refers to the region immediately to the southwest of the bay, roughly corresponding to Svalbarðshreppur municipality.

The fjord is named after the settler Ketil þistill ("thistle") but the Landnámabók does not say much about him and does not mention from where in Norway he came.
