= Einar Kristinn Guðfinnsson =

Icelandic politician (born 1955)

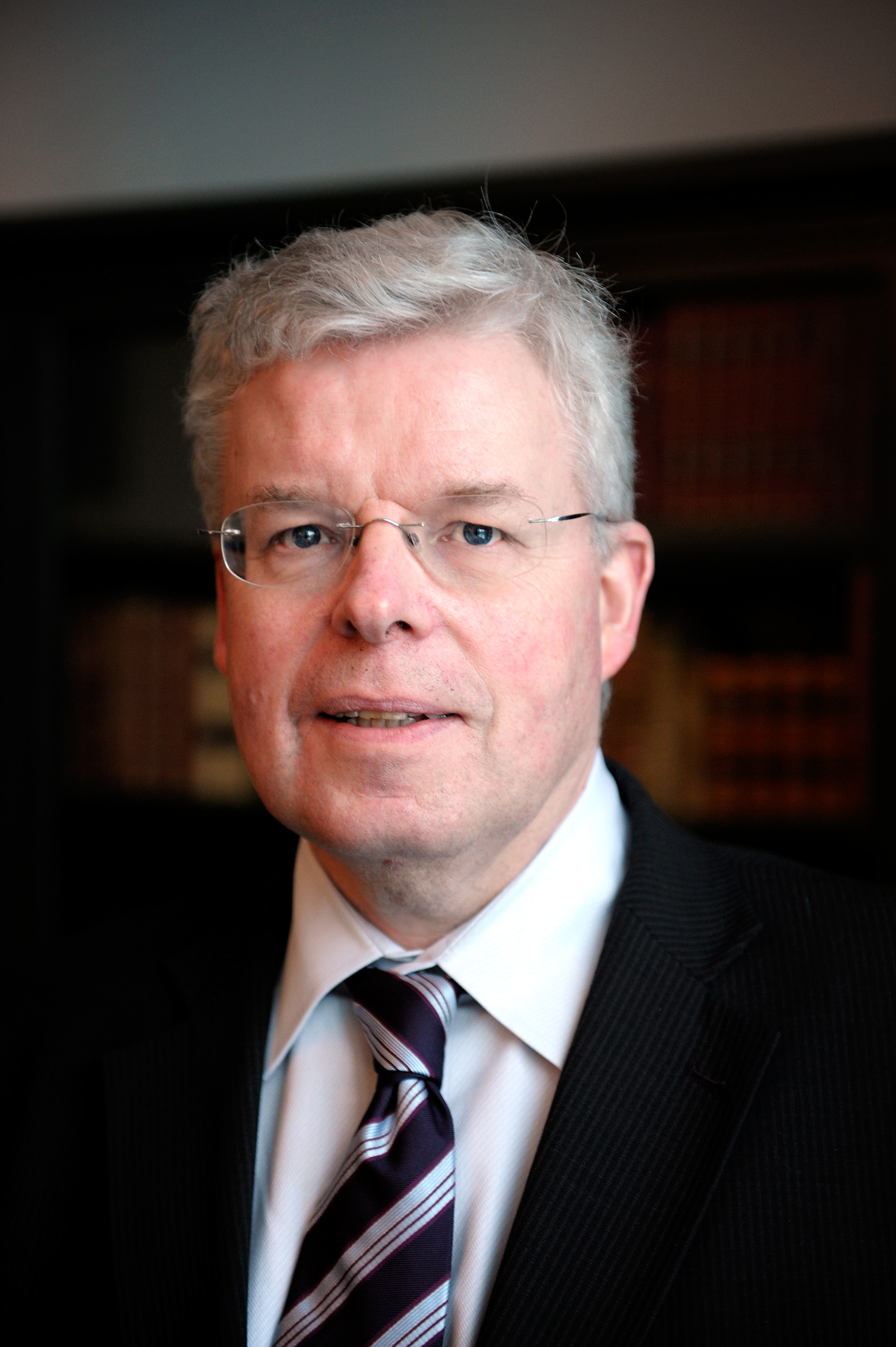

Minister of Fisheries and Agriculture
- In office 27 September 2005 (as Minister of Fisheries) – 1 February 2009
- Prime Minister: Halldór Ásgrímsson; Geir Haarde
- Preceded by: Árni Mathiesen (as Minister of Fisheries); Guðni Ágústsson (as Minister of Agriculture)
- Succeeded by: Steingrímur J. Sigfússon

Personal details
- Born: 2 December 1955 (age 70) Bolungarvík, Iceland
- Party: Independence Party
- Spouse: Sigrún J. Þórisdóttir
- Children: three children
- Education: University of Essex

Einar Kristinn Guðfinnsson (born 2 December 1955) is an Icelandic politician. He was speaker of the Althing, in office 2013 until 2016. He was Iceland's Minister of Fisheries from September 2005, and became Minister of Fisheries and Agriculture when the two ministries merged on 1 January 2008 until 1 February 2009.

Political offices
Preceded by Árni Mathiesen	Minister of Fisheries; 2005–2007	Post merged with Ministry of Agriculture
New title	Minister of Fisheries and Agriculture; 2007–2009	Succeeded by Steingrímur J. Sigfússon
Preceded by Guðni Ágústsson as Minister of Agriculture	Minister of Fisheries and Agriculture; 2007–2009	Succeeded by Steingrímur J. Sigfússon
