= Árni Mathiesen =

Icelandic politician

Árni M. Mathiesen
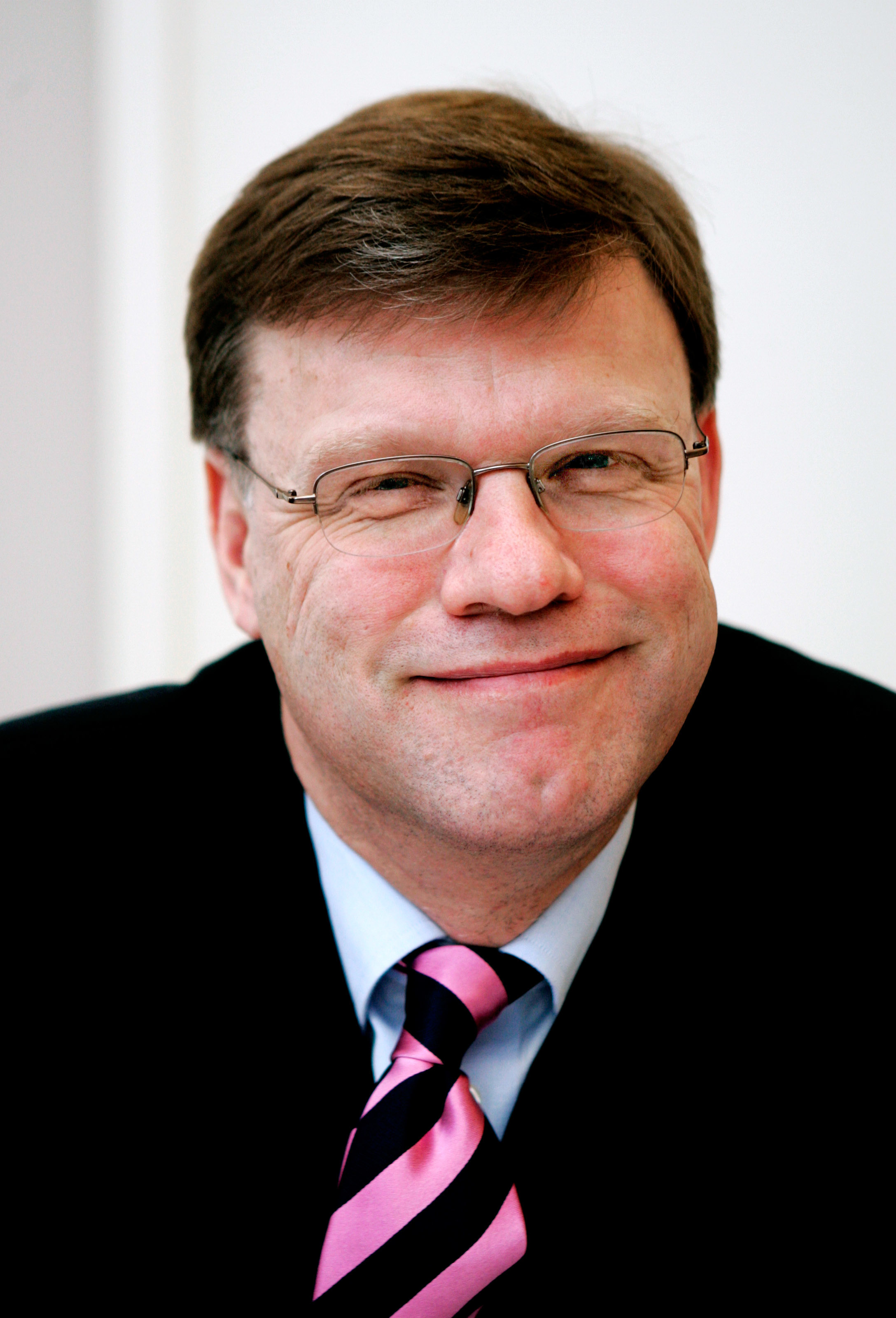

Minister of Finance
- In office 27 September 2005 – 1 February 2009
- Prime Minister: Halldór Ásgrímsson; Geir Haarde
- Preceded by: Geir Haarde
- Succeeded by: Steingrímur J. Sigfússon

Minister of Fisheries
- In office 1999–2005
- Prime Minister: Davíð Oddsson; Halldór Ásgrímsson
- Preceded by: Þorsteinn Pálsson
- Succeeded by: Einar Kristinn Guðfinnsson

Personal details
- Born: 2 October 1958 (age 68) Reykjavík, Iceland
- Party: Independence Party
- Spouse: Steinunn Kristín Friðjónsdóttir
- Children: Kristín Unnur Mathiesen, Halla Sigrún Mathiesen, Arna Steinunn Mathiesen
- Education: University of Edinburgh; University of Stirling
- Profession: Veterinarian

Árni M. Mathiesen (born 2 October 1958 in Reykjavík) is an Icelandic politician. From September 2005 through 31 January 2009, he was Minister of Finance in Iceland. From 1999 to 2005 he was Minister of Fisheries. Mathiesen was first elected to the Althing (Iceland's parliament) for the Independence Party in 1991, when he was the youngest member of the Althing at the age of 33.

== Biography ==
Mathiesen graduated from Flensborgarskóli in Hafnarfjörður with a university entrance diploma in 1978. He studied veterinary medicine at the University of Edinburgh, qualifying as veterinarian in 1983. He studied fish pathology at the University of Stirling and in 1985 was awarded the MSc in Aquatic Veterinary Science.

After completing his studies, he worked as veterinarian in various areas of Iceland, and served as veterinary officer for fish diseases 1985–1995. Mathiesen was also the managing director of the aquaculture firm Faxalax hf. 1988–1989.

Árni M. Mathiesen was chairman of the Flensborgarskóli student association 1977–78, president of Stefnir, the association of young conservatives in Hafnarfjörður 1986–88, and vice-president of SUS, the association of young conservatives in Iceland 1985–87. He was a member of the Board of the Guarantee Division of Aquaculture Loans 1990–94, of the Board of the Icelandic Veterinary Association 1986–87, and was on the Salary Council of the Confederation of University Graduates 1985–87. He was chairman of the team handball division of his local FH club 1988–90 and was a member of the Flensborgarskóli school board from 1990 to 1999. Mathiesen was an Icelandic representative on the Nordic Council 1991–95; he has been a member of the Board of Búnaðarbanki Íslands and of the Agricultural Loan Fund and the chairman of the Council of the Prevention of Cruelty to Animals. Mathiesen was also a member of the EFTA/EEA parliamentarians' committee from 1995 to 1999. He is the ADG of the Fisheries and Aquaculture Department at FAO, in Rome, where he lives with his family, from 2010 to present.

== See also ==
- Politics of Iceland

Political offices
Preceded by Þorsteinn Pálsson	Minister of Fisheries; 1999–2005	Succeeded by Einar Kristinn Guðfinnsson
Preceded by Geir Haarde	Minister of Finance; 2005–2009	Succeeded by Steingrímur J. Sigfússon
