= Bakkaflói =

Coordinates: 66.125°N 14.857°W

Bakkaflói (Icelandic pronunciation: [ˈpahkaˌflouːɪ]) is a bay in the northeastern region of Iceland. It is north of Bakkafjordur and southeast of Langanes.
