= Langanes =

Peninsula in northeast Iceland

Coordinates: 66°12′N 15°20′W

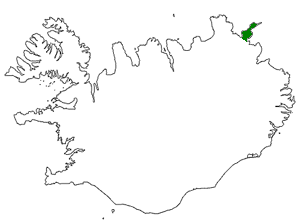
The location of Langanes within Iceland.

Langanes (Icelandic pronunciation: [ˈlauŋkaˌnɛːs]) is a peninsula in northeast Iceland. The name literally means "long peninsula". It is 45 kilometres (28 mi) long from southwest to northeast, ending in a thin strip of land called Fontur [ˈfɔn̥tʏr̥] (regionally also [ˈfɔntʰʏr̥]) where there is also a suggestive lighthouse called Langanesviti [ˈlauŋkaˌnɛsˌvɪːtɪ]. It is bounded by Þistilfjörður to the northwest and Bakkaflói to the southeast, while the terrain inland reaches elevations of 200–450 metres (600–1200 feet). The highest point is Gunnólfsvíkurfjall [ˈkʏnːoul(f)sˌviːkʏrˌfjatl̥] in the southeast of the peninsula, at 719 m.

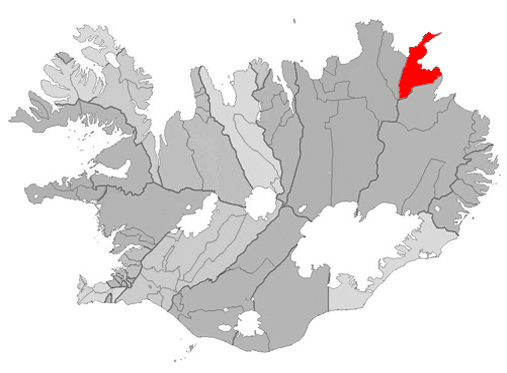
The Langanesbyggð municipality

The peninsula is composed of late Pliocene-early Pleistocene lavas. Kistufjall [ˈcʰɪstʏˌfjatl̥] (444 m) is the distinctive tuya (table mountain) volcano that resulted from subglacial eruptions.

Administratively, Langanes forms part of the Langanesbyggð municipality (population 480 in 2008). Virtually all of the population live in the village of Þórshöfn (Thorshofn) on the northwestern coast, which has a small airport. Sauðanes [ˈsœyːðaˌnɛːs], just to the north of Þórshöfn, has an ancient church which has been converted into a museum. The fishing village of Skálar [ˈskauːlar̥], on the southeastern coast near the tip of the peninsula, had a population of over a hundred in the early 20th century, but was abandoned by 1946. Other abandoned settlements include Heiðarhöfn [ˈheiːðarˌhœpn̥], Læknistaðir [ˈlaihknɪˌstaːðɪr̥], Skoruvík [ˈskɔːrʏˌviːk], Fagranes [ˈfaɣraˌnɛːs] and Saurbær [ˈsœyrˌpaiːr̥].

A radar station (NATO ID: H-2) was operated in Heiðarhöfn, on mountain Heiðarfjall [ˈheiːðarˌfjatl̥], from 1954 to 1968 to monitor Soviet activity in the GIUK gap. Nowadays the buildings are difficult to reach and remain in a deteriorating condition, most without windows, abandoned to the elements. The new radar station (NATO ID: H-2A) is located atop the next mountain, 15 kilometres (9.3 mi) south, on mount Gunnólfsvíkurfjall and is an integral part of the Iceland Air Defence System, helping NATO and the country itself to effectively monitor its airspace.

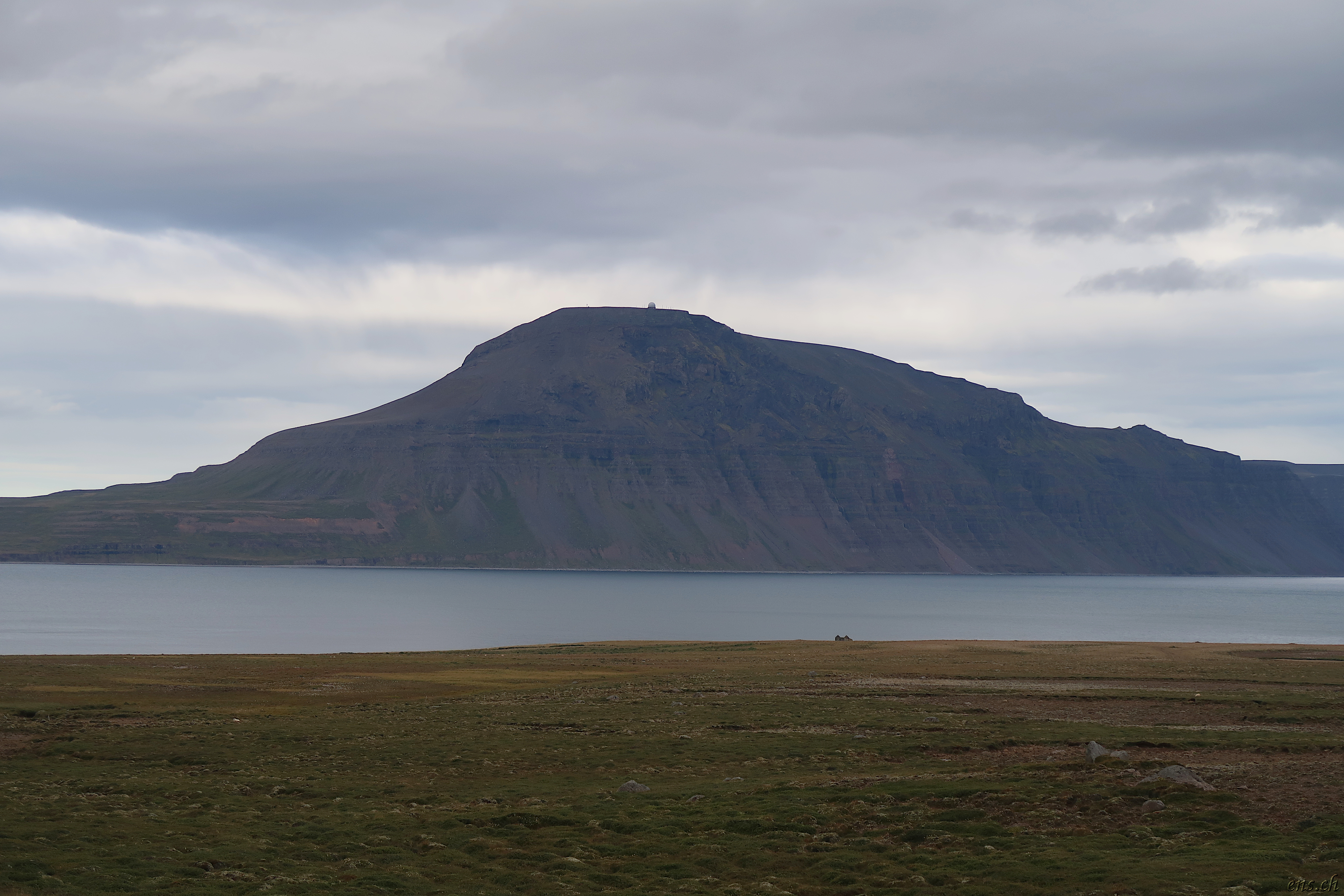
Gunnólfsvíkurfjall and the H-3A radar station as seen from below

In the spring time (May–June) seabirds (guillemot and kittiwake) lay their eggs in the cliffs at Langanes and for those interested there may be an opportunity to watch egg-gatherers at work in the cliffs. The Langanes peninsula is popular with bird-watchers and holds the third largest gannet nesting place in the world at Stórkarl [ˈstourˌkʰa(r)tl̥].
