= Unnur Brá Konráðsdóttir =

Icelandic politician

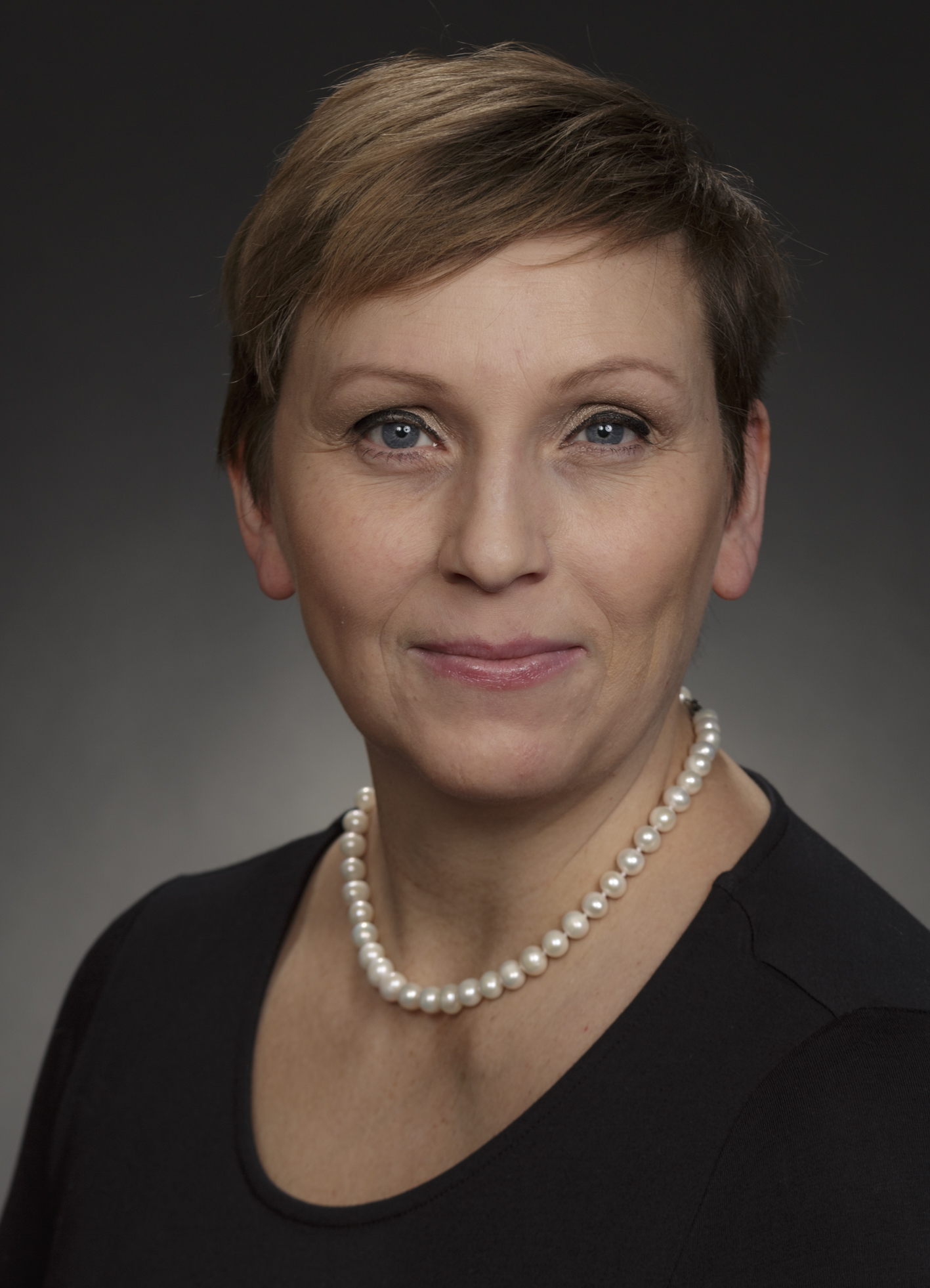

Speaker of the Althing
- In office 24 January 2017 – 28 October 2017
- President: Guðni Th. Jóhannesson
- Prime Minister: Bjarni Benediktsson
- Preceded by: Steingrímur J. Sigfússon
- Succeeded by: Steingrímur J. Sigfússon (acting)

22nd President of the West Nordic Council
- In office 2013–2014
- Preceded by: Josef Motzfeldt
- Succeeded by: Bill Justinussen

Personal details
- Born: 6 April 1974 (age 52) Reykjavík, Iceland
- Party: Independence Party
- Children: Konráð Oscar (born 2004); Bríet Járngerður (born 2008); Hervör Úlfdís Gná (born 2016)
- Parent(s): Konráð Oscar Auðunsson (1916-1999); Sigrid Haraldsdóttir (born 1931)
- Education: University of Iceland
- Profession: Lawyer

Unnur Brá Konráðsdóttir (born 6 April 1974) is an Icelandic politician. She served as the Speaker of the Althing from the 24th of January 2017 until she failed to be re-elected in the 2017 Icelandic parliamentary election. She has also served as the chair of the Parliament's Judicial Affairs and Education Committee.
