= Björn Jónsson (minister) =

Icelandic politician (1916–1985)

Björn Jónsson (3 September 1916 – 26 April 1985) was an Icelandic politician and former minister for social affairs from July 1973 to May 1974.
