= 1999 Icelandic parliamentary election =

- 8 May 1999
- All 63 seats in the Althing
- Turnout: 84.11%
Party	Leader	Vote %	Seats	+/–
Independence	Davíð Oddsson	40.74	26	+1
Social Democratic	Margrét Frímannsdóttir	26.78	17	−6
Progressive	Halldór Ásgrímsson	18.35	12	−3
Left-Green	Steingrímur J. Sigfússon	9.12	6	New
Liberal	Sverrir Hermannsson	4.17	2	New
This lists parties that won seats. See the complete results below.
Results by constituency
Prime Minister before	Prime Minister after election
Davíð Oddsson; Independence	Davíð Oddsson; Independence

Parliamentary elections were held in Iceland on 8 May 1999. The Independence Party remained the largest party in the Althing, winning 26 of the 63 seats. The coalition government of the Independence Party and Progressive Party remained in office, with Davíð Oddsson continuing as Prime Minister.

== Results ==
Party	Votes	%	+/–	Seats	+/–
Independence Party	67,513	40.74	+3.67	26	+1
Social Democratic Alliance	44,378	26.78	–10.96	17	–6
Progressive Party	30,415	18.35	–4.97	12	–3
Left-Green Movement	15,115	9.12	New	6	New
Liberal Party	6,919	4.17	New	2	New
Humanist Party	742	0.45	New	0	New
Christian Democratic Party	441	0.27	New	0	New
Anarchists in Iceland	204	0.12	New	0	New
Total	165,727	100.00	–	63	0
Valid votes	165,727	97.82			
Invalid/blank votes	3,697	2.18			
Total votes	169,424	100.00			
Registered voters/turnout	201,443	84.11			
Source: Nohlen & Stöver, Election Resources

=== By constituency ===
Constituency	Independence	Left-Green	Liberal	Progressive	Social Democratic	Other
Eastern	26.34%	10.96%	2.90%	38.40%	21.20%	0.19%
Northeastern	29.85%	22.04%	1.88%	29.17%	16.78%	0.27%
Northwestern	31.94%	9.41%	3.27%	30.33%	24.84%	0.22%
Reykjanes	44.66%	5.86%	4.63%	16.03%	28.07%	0.75%
Reykjavík	45.71%	9.39%	4.18%	10.35%	29.02%	1.34%
Southern	36.02%	2.88%	2.85%	29.18%	28.73%	0.34%
Western	33.35%	9.71%	1.99%	28.46%	26.11%	0.38%
Westfjords	29.61%	5.53%	17.71%	23.18%	23.59%	0.37%
Source: Constituency Level Election Archive
