= Ingvar Gíslason =

Icelandic politician (1926–2022)

Ingvar Gíslason (28 March 1926 – 17 August 2022) was an Icelandic politician, the minister of education, science and culture from 1980 to 1983 and a speaker of the lower house of the Althing.

He died on 17 August 2022, at the age of 96.
