= Þórshöfn =

- Village
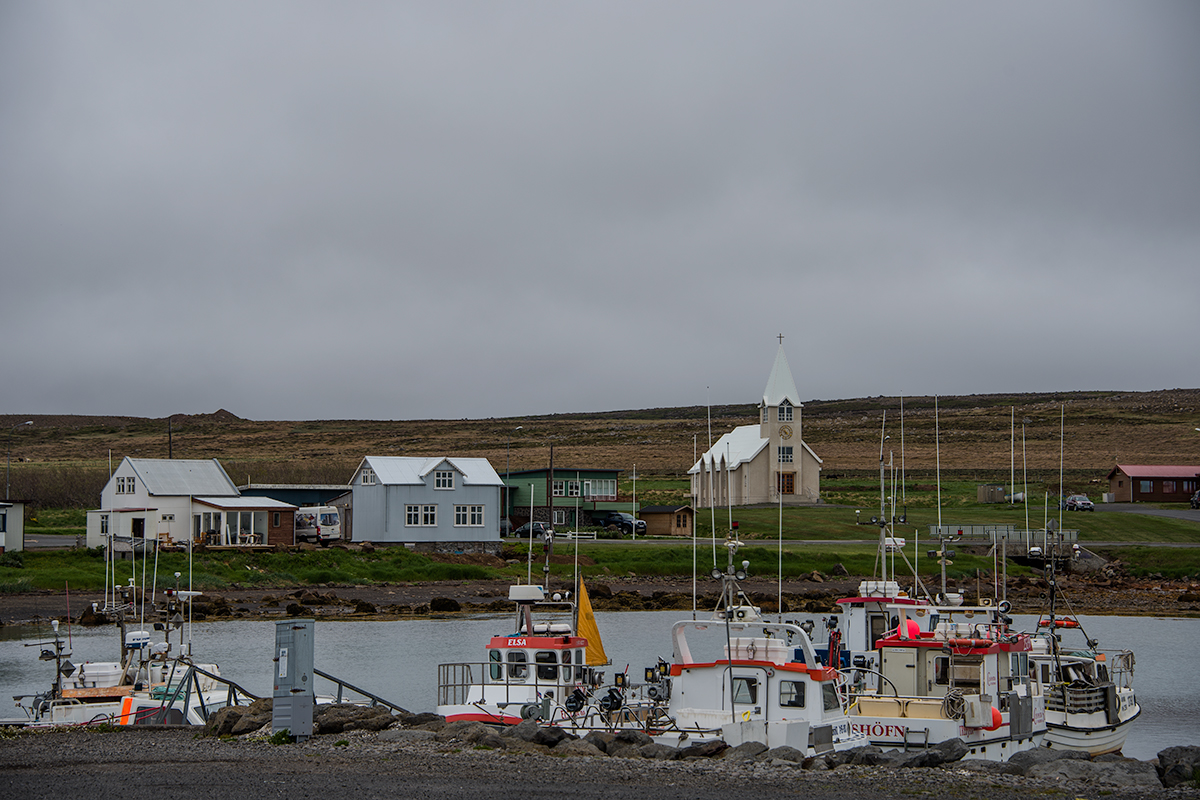

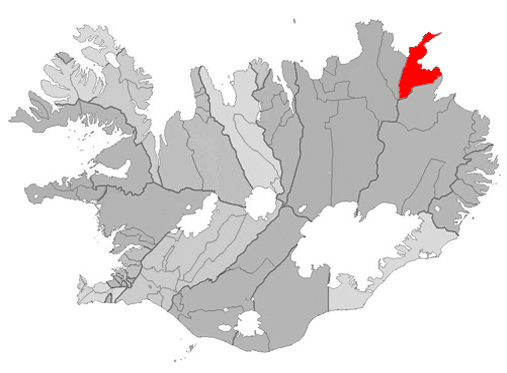
- Location of the Municipality of Langanesbyggð

- Location within Iceland Location within Europe
- Coordinates: 66°12′N 15°20′W
- Country: Iceland
- Constituency: Northeast Constituency
- Region: Northeastern Region
- Municipality: Langanesbyggð

Population (2011)
  - Total: 380
- Time zone: UTC+0 (GMT)
- Post Code: 680
- Website: Official website

Þórshöfn (Icelandic pronunciation: [ˈθour̥sˌhœpn̥]) or Thorshofn is a small fishing village in northeast Iceland, located on the northern coast of the Langanes peninsula on the Þistilfjörður bay.

The village has a population of 380 people. It is the administrative centre of Langanesbyggð municipality and formerly of the neighbouring Svalbarðshreppur municipality until the two merged. In Þórshöfn there is a year-round service to tourists, and Icelandair connects the village to Akureyri and Reykjavík with seasonal flights from Þórshöfn Airport.

Þórshöfn is also the Icelandic name of Tórshavn (capital of the Faroe Islands).

== Climate ==
The climate is arctic (Koppen: ET) with cold winters and cool summers.

Climate data for Miðfjarðarnes, Langanesbyggð (2000–2014)
Month	Jan	Feb	Mar	Apr	May	Jun	Jul	Aug	Sep	Oct	Nov	Dec	Year
Record high °C (°F)	12.2 (54.0)	14.0 (57.2)	13.1 (55.6)	20.8 (69.4)	20.2 (68.4)	22.5 (72.5)	25.0 (77.0)	25.9 (78.6)	21.0 (69.8)	16.8 (62.2)	14.5 (58.1)	14.8 (58.6)	25.9 (78.6)
Mean daily maximum °C (°F)	2.9 (37.2)	2.8 (37.0)	2.8 (37.0)	5.0 (41.0)	7.2 (45.0)	10.5 (50.9)	12.7 (54.9)	12.5 (54.5)	10.7 (51.3)	6.2 (43.2)	3.4 (38.1)	2.8 (37.0)	6.7 (44.1)
Daily mean °C (°F)	−0.1 (31.8)	−0.7 (30.7)	−0.6 (30.9)	1.2 (34.2)	3.8 (38.8)	7.1 (44.8)	9.3 (48.7)	9.4 (48.9)	7.0 (44.6)	3.1 (37.6)	0.8 (33.4)	−0.5 (31.1)	3.3 (37.9)
Mean daily minimum °C (°F)	−3.5 (25.7)	−3.8 (25.2)	−3.6 (25.5)	−1.8 (28.8)	0.7 (33.3)	4.1 (39.4)	6.4 (43.5)	6.3 (43.3)	3.8 (38.8)	0.5 (32.9)	−2.3 (27.9)	−4.0 (24.8)	0.2 (32.4)
Record low °C (°F)	−20.5 (−4.9)	−16.9 (1.6)	−18.7 (−1.7)	−18.4 (−1.1)	−10.5 (13.1)	−4.2 (24.4)	−1.2 (29.8)	−2.1 (28.2)	−6.1 (21.0)	−14.0 (6.8)	−19.3 (−2.7)	−19.1 (−2.4)	−20.5 (−4.9)
Average precipitation mm (inches)	46 (1.8)	33 (1.3)	40 (1.6)	37 (1.5)	46 (1.8)	36 (1.4)	49 (1.9)	66 (2.6)	90 (3.5)	93 (3.7)	80 (3.1)	44 (1.7)	660 (26.0)
Source: Veðurstofa Íslands

== Sights ==
Sauðanes, a farm about seven kilometres north of Þórshöfn on Langanes peninsula, has a church built in 1889 and a parsonage (Sauðaneshús) dating from 1879 which was the first stone building in the Northeastern part of Iceland. The church doors were made of driftwood, and the winged altarpiece dates from 1742. The pulpit was created in the 18th century as well. The parsonage was renovated from 1991 to 2003 and transformed into a museum.
