= Humanist Party (Iceland) =

Humanist Party Húmanistaflokkurinn
- Chairperson: Júlíus Valdimarsson
- Founded: 25 June 1984
- Headquarters: Brautarholt 4, 105 Reykjavík
- Ideology: Universal humanism Libertarian socialism Anti-capitalism; Collectivist anarchism
- Political position: Left-wing
- International affiliation: Humanist Movement
- Colours: Orange, White
- Seats in Parliament: 0 / 63

Election symbol
- H

The Humanist Party (Icelandic: Húmanistaflokkurinn) is a political party in Iceland founded on 25 June 1984 as the Human Party (Icelandic: Flokkur mannsins). It adopted its current name in 1995. It has run candidates in the 1987 and 1999 parliamentary elections, but has never achieved representation. It is related to the International Humanist Party.

They successfully applied for the list letter H to contest the 2013 Icelandic parliamentary election, and subsequently submitted an official candidate list on 12 April 2013. In the 2013 election, they chose to only run candidates in the Reykjavik North and Reykjavik South constituencies.

== History ==
The party ran candidates in the 1987 and 1999 parliamentary elections. They also stood candidates for the Reykjavík City Council in 1986, 1990, 1998, and 2002. They never achieved representation in either body.

== Electoral results ==
=== Parliament ===
Election year	# of overall votes	% of overall vote	# of overall seats won	±
1987	2,434	1.6	0 / 63	0
1999	▼742	▼0.4	0 / 63	0
2013	▼126	▼0.07	0 / 63	0
2016	▼33	▼0.02	0 / 63	0
