= Langanesbyggð =

- Municipality
- Location of the municipality

- Location within Iceland
- Coordinates: 66.199008°N 15.3447548°W
- Country: Iceland
- Region: Northeastern Region
- Constituency: Northeast Constituency

Government
  - Manager: Elías Pétursson

Area
  - Total: 1,332 km^{2} (514 sq mi)

Population
  - Total: 531
  - Density: 0.4/km^{2} (1.0/sq mi)
- Postal code(s): 680, 681, 685
- Municipal number: 6709
- Website: langanesbyggd.is

Langanesbyggð (Icelandic pronunciation: [ˈlauŋkaˌnɛsˌpɪɣθ]) is a municipality in northeastern Iceland, just north of Eastern Region. The main village is Þórshöfn, in the north there is the Langanes peninsula.
