= Guðmundur Kristján Bjarnason =

Icelandic politician (born 1944)

Guðmundur Kristján Bjarnason (born 9 October 1944) is an Icelandic politician and former minister.
