= Svalbarðshreppur =

- Former municipality
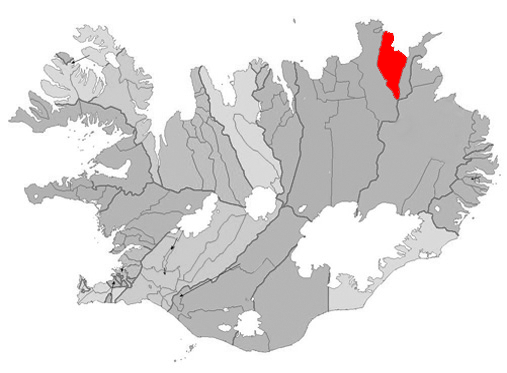
- Location of the municipality

- Location within Iceland
- Coordinates: 66.199°N 15.336°W
- Country: Iceland
- Region: Northeastern Region
- Constituency: Northeast Constituency
- Municipality: Langanesbyggð

Area
  - Total: 1,155 km^{2} (446 sq mi)

Population
  - Total: 90
  - Density: 0.08/km^{2} (0.21/sq mi)
- Postal code(s): 680, 681
- Website: svalbardshreppur.is

Svalbarðshreppur (Icelandic pronunciation: [ˈsvalˌparðsˌr̥ɛhpʏr̥]) is a former municipality in northeastern Iceland, between Norðurþing and Langanesbyggð. The municipality was administered from Þórshöfn in the neighbouring Langanesbyggð municipality. The area is known for its salmon rivers. In March 2022, residents of Svalbarðshreppur and Langanesbyggð voted to merge the two municipalities into one, which was formalized in June 2022.
