= Bragi Sigurjónsson =

Icelandic politician (1910–1995)

Bragi Sigurjónsson (9 November 1910 – 29 October 1995) was an Icelandic politician and former minister. He was Minister of Agriculture and Minister of Industry from 1979 to 1980.
