= Halldór Blöndal =

Icelandic politician

Halldór Blöndal (24 August 1938 – 16 December 2025) was a politician of the Independence Party (Iceland). He was the son of Kristjana Benediktsdóttir, Bjarni Benediktsson's sister. He worked as a teacher and a journalist from 1959 until 1980. From 1971 to 1979, he frequently sat on Althingi as a substitute member. He gained a seat of his own in the Parliament in 1979, where he has served for Iceland's North Eastern Constituency. Counted as strong supporter of whaling due to his summertime jobs in whale processing from 1954 to 1974, he helped building whale watching tourism industry while he was Minister of Communication and Tourism 1991 to 1999. He was also Minister of Agriculture in the first term of Davíð Oddsson as prime minister from 1991 to 1995.

From 1999 to 2005, Halldór was the president of the Althing and during his term the old house of the Althing was completely renovated and a new service building erected. From 2005 to 2007 he was chairman of the Committee of foreign affairs of Althing. He retired from the Icelandic parliament in 2007.
