= 2026 Icelandic European Union membership negotiations referendum =

- 29 August 2026
- "Should Iceland resume accession negotiations with the European Union?" (Note: Icelandic: „Á Ísland að hefja á ný aðildarviðræður við Evrópusambandið?“)
- Voting system: Majority vote

Results
| Choice | Votes | % |
|---|---|---|
| Yes | 105,338 | 47.16% |
| No | 118,047 | 52.84% |
| Valid votes | 223,385 | 99.27% |
| Invalid or blank votes | 1,646 | 0.73% |
| Total votes | 225,031 | 100.00% |
| Registered voters/turnout | 272,543 | 82.57% |
- Results by constituency Yes: 50–60% No: 50–60% 60–70% Each block on the map represents 1000 votes.

A referendum on the resumption of European Union membership negotiations by the Icelandic government was held in Iceland on 29 August 2026. Its result was to reject the proposal for resuming accession negotiations with 52.84% voting no and 47.16% voting yes.

Iceland applied to join the European Union (EU) in 2009, but negotiations have been suspended since 2013. Subsequent governments have insisted that negotiations be approved by referendum before they resume. After the 2024 parliamentary election, the new coalition government of the Social Democratic Alliance, Viðreisn (Liberal Reform Party) and the People's Party agreed to hold a referendum by 2027, although the People's Party did not support EU membership itself.

The Yes campaign argued that Iceland already adopts many EU laws through the European Economic Area (EEA) but has no direct influence over EU decisions. Supporters also highlighted potential economic benefits, including greater currency stability through possible euro adoption, and argued that membership could strengthen Iceland's position during geopolitical uncertainty, citing the Greenland crisis. The No campaign focused on sovereignty, arguing that EU membership could reduce Iceland's control over agriculture, fisheries (including the country's tolerance of commercial whaling), and natural resources. Opponents also criticised EU bureaucracy and argued that the current EEA arrangement provides economic access to Europe without giving up national decision-making power.

== Background ==
=== 2010s ===
The then Social Democratic Alliance–led government of Iceland applied to join the EU in July 2009 after the country suffered a severe financial crisis. Despite three years of negotiations, several major issues remained outstanding, including the Common Fisheries Policy. On 14 January 2013, the Icelandic government announced that negotiations would be suspended until after the parliamentary election in April. No new chapters will be opened prior to the election, though negotiations will continue on chapters that have already been opened. The ruling left-wing parties suffered a major defeat in the elections, while the centrist Progressive Party had a large victory.

The leaders of the Progressive Party and the Independence Party, which both oppose Icelandic EU membership, announced on 22 May 2013 that a coalition platform had been reached that would suspend all accession talks with the EU and not resume them unless first approved by a referendum. The advisor to Sigmundur Davíð Gunnlaugsson, the incoming prime minister, stated that "later in the term there will be a referendum on whether Iceland should continue the talks, although no date has been decided." The new Finance Minister Bjarni Benediktsson stated that "We believe the accession talks were started without the necessary support in Iceland. We will not go further with the talks. We also have to listen to what the EU has to say about our approach; maybe it will make no sense to hold a referendum".

On 22 February 2014, the governing parties agreed to formally withdraw the membership application, without first holding a referendum on the matter, and submitted a bill to parliament seeking their approval to do so. However, on 25 February, Ragnheiður Ríkharðsdóttir, Chairman of the Independence Party parliamentarian group, announced her intention not to vote in favour of the proposal.

The Independence/Progressive coalition lost its majority in the 2016 Icelandic parliamentary election. After several failed attempts to form a government from alternative combinations, a new coalition was formed in January 2017, led by the Independence party and joined by Regeneration and Bright Future, both of whom support EU membership: Regeneration was originally a splinter movement that left the Independence party over this very issue. The coalition deal included a pledge to hold a parliamentary vote on whether to hold an EU membership referendum.

=== 2020s ===
On 21 March 2022, party leaders from the Social Democratic Alliance, the Pirate Party and Viðreisn, submitted their proposals to the Althing that an EU membership referendum should be held before the end of 2022. On 15 September 2022, the three party leaders drafted a question for the referendum: "Do you want Iceland to take up the matter in negotiations with the European Union with the aim of concluding a membership agreement that would be submitted to the nation for approval or rejection? Answer options would be yes or no." On 20 September 2022, the leader of the Social Democratic Alliance, Logi Már Einarsson, wrote a speech for Icelandic president Guðni Th. Jóhannesson requesting the referendum before the end of 2023. On 23 March 2023, according to Jón Steindór Valdimarsson, as the polls indicated that 66% supported a "yes" in the referendum, he believed that such referendum should be held before the next elections in 2025. On 18 September 2023, a draft bill for the referendum was proposed by Viðreisn leader Þorgerður Katrín Gunnarsdóttir, with support from the members of the Social Democratic Alliance and the Pirate Party, including Logi Már.

Following the 2024 Icelandic parliamentary election, the Social Democratic Alliance, Viðreisn and People's Party formed a new coalition government, which agreed to hold a referendum on resuming negotiations on EU membership by 2027. Prior to organising the referendum, the new government would first establish a panel of independent experts to assess the advantages and disadvantages of retaining the Icelandic króna compared to adopting the euro currency, which it believed will ensure a more mature debate.

In January 2026, Þorgerður Katrín, now serving as Minister for Foreign Affairs, said the government intended to bring a parliamentary resolution on the referendum to Althing during spring of 2026. Under Icelandic law, the referendum would have to be held within three to twelve months after the approval of the resolution. In February 2026, Politico Europe reported, based on two sources, that the governing coalition considered holding the referendum as early as August 2026, as a result of geopolitical upheaval; in particular due to the tariff hikes imposed by the second Trump administration (acting since January 2025) on Icelandic goods and the threats by the US to annex Greenland and neighboring Canada. Some days later in Warsaw, Prime Minister Kristrún Frostadóttir confirmed that Iceland was going to have such a referendum later that year. At the same time Polish prime minister Donald Tusk said that he supported Icelandic membership of the bloc.

On 6 March 2026, Kristrún stated that her government had agreed to hold the referendum on 29 August 2026. Enlargement commissioner Marta Kos welcomed the announcement, saying "A significant decision now lies ahead for the Icelandic people." Kristrún said if Icelanders voted yes, talks could start by the end of 2026. On 28 May 2026, the Althing approved the proposal to hold the referendum.

=== Question ===
The question put forward for the referendum was:

Á Ísland að hefja á ný aðildarviðræður við Evrópusambandið?
Should Iceland resume accession negotiations with the European Union?

The choices were:

- Já. (Yes.)
- Nei. (No.)

== Party stances ==
| Group | Political party | Position | Ideology | Leader | Seats (Note: Amount of seats in parliament following the 2024 Icelandic parliamentary election.) | Ref. |
|---|---|---|---|---|---|---|
| Government | Social Democratic Alliance | Yes | Social democracy | Kristrún Frostadóttir | 15 | |
| Government | Viðreisn | Yes | Liberalism | Þorgerður Katrín Gunnarsdóttir | 11 | |
| Government | People's Party | No | Populism; Disability rights | Inga Sæland | 10 | |
| Opposition | Independence Party | No | Conservatism | Guðrún Hafsteinsdóttir | 14 | |
| Opposition | Centre Party | No | Conservatism; Right-wing populism | Sigmundur Davíð Gunnlaugsson | 8 | |
| Opposition | Progressive Party | No | Nordic agrarianism | Lilja Dögg Alfreðsdóttir | 5 | |
| Extra-parliamentary | Socialist Party | No | Democratic socialism | Jón Ferdínand Estherarson | 0 | |
| Extra-parliamentary | Pirate Party | Neutral | Pirate politics | Oktavía Hrund Guðrúnar Jóns | 0 | |
| Extra-parliamentary | Left-Green Movement | No | Eco-socialism | Rósa Björk Brynjólfsdóttir | 0 | |

== Opinion polls ==
| Institute | Fieldwork | Yes | No | Lead | Reference |
|---|---|---|---|---|---|
| Maskína | 28 August 2026 | 50.4 | 49.6 | 0.8 | |
| Gallup | 24–27 August 2026 | 48.4 | 51.6 | 3.2 | |
| Maskína | 21–25 August 2026 | 51.3 | 48.7 | 2.6 | |
| Gallup | 1–13 August 2026 | 51.5 | 48.5 | 3.0 | |
| Maskína | 7–11 August 2026 | 52.2 | 47.8 | 4.4 | |
| Gallup | 15–30 July 2026 | 50 | 50 | Tie | |
| Maskína | 22–29 July 2026 | 53 | 47 | 6 | |
| Gallup | 12–24 June 2026 | 52 | 48 | 4 | |
| Maskína | 2–11 June 2026 | 53.1 | 46.9 | 6.2 | |

== Issues ==
Commentators broadly agreed that the campaign was dominated by three domestic questions – fisheries, sovereignty and the economy – and that the changed security environment in the North Atlantic, although frequently cited by international observers as the reason the referendum was being held at all, played a smaller part in the domestic debate than expected.

=== Fisheries ===
Fishing occupies a central place in the Icelandic economy and in national self-understanding, accounting for around 8% of GDP and close to 40% of exports and the memory of the Cod Wars of 1958–1976, in which Iceland successfully asserted control over an expanding exclusive economic zone against the United Kingdom, remained a live reference point during the campaign. A trawler captain in Vestmannaeyjar interviewed by AFP summarised the prevailing view in the fishing ports by observing that "our people fought for these 200 miles around Iceland".

Accession would have brought Iceland within the Common Fisheries Policy (CFP), under which catch limits are set annually at EU level and enforced by member states. Opponents argued that Iceland would lose the ability to set its own quotas and that investment in the sector would be opened to foreign ownership. A Gallup poll conducted before the vote found that 90% of Icelandic companies connected to the fishing sector were opposed to membership.

The government sought to address these concerns by stating that it would seek full authority over the national fisheries management system in any negotiation and the European Commission indicated a willingness to explore flexible arrangements. Foreign Minister Þorgerður Katrín Gunnarsdóttir argued that Iceland's weight in the sector gave it leverage in any talks. Supporters of renewed talks also noted that CFP quotas are allocated partly on the basis of historical fishing patterns and that since no EU member state had fished Icelandic waters for decades, Iceland would in practice retain effective control. Some in the sector argued that the terms available could only be established by negotiating.

These assurances did not persuade the industry. The employers' body Fisheries Iceland said it lacked confidence that a clear set of non-negotiable positions had been established and European officials were reported to have cautioned that a formal, permanent exemption from the CFP would be highly unusual and would carry implications beyond Iceland's own accession. A further argument advanced against the CFP concerned stock management, with opponents contrasting the condition of Icelandic stocks with those in EU waters.

=== Sovereignty and the EEA ===
Sovereignty formed the second principal line of argument. Opponents held that as a member state Iceland would be bound by decisions taken in Brussels and would surrender independence secured comparatively recently, the country having become fully independent of Denmark in 1944; for this camp sovereignty was a question of political identity as much as of constitutional law. On this view the existing relationship already delivered market access and free movement without the full political and institutional commitments of membership.

Supporters inverted the argument. Through the European Economic Area (EEA) and the Schengen Area, Iceland participates in the single market, the Emissions Trading System and programmes such as Erasmus and Horizon; this has required the adoption of some 9,000 EU legal acts, without any Icelandic vote on their content, since the country is represented in neither the Council nor the European Parliament. Guðbjörg Ríkey Thoroddsen Hauksdóttir of the Centre for Arctic Studies at the University of Iceland characterised the pro-membership position as resting on the observation that "Iceland already adopts EU policies through the EEA without having voting rights", so that accession would increase rather than diminish national influence. Fisheries and agriculture are excluded from the EEA arrangement.

=== Economy, the króna and the euro ===
Economic arguments centred on the Icelandic króna and the cost of living. At the time of the referendum the Central Bank of Iceland's policy rate stood at 8.00%, against 2.25% at the European Central Bank, and mortgage rates of around 9% were cited by younger voters as an obstacle to home ownership. Supporters of renewed talks argued that membership and eventual adoption of the euro would reduce borrowing costs and inflation; Vilhjálmur Hilmarsson, chief economist at the trade union Viska, described the euro as a potential "catalyst to a more healthy economy" while cautioning that it would not resolve Iceland's structural weaknesses.

A report on currency options commissioned by the Ministry of Finance and Economic Affairs and published in May 2026 concluded that the costs of retaining an independent currency probably exceeded the benefits and that adopting the euro could lower interest rates and transaction costs. The report described the króna as markedly more volatile than the other Nordic currencies and noted that exchange-rate movements feed into inflation through import prices. Membership would additionally have brought Iceland into the customs union. Opponents, including Independence Party leader Guðrún Hafsteinsdóttir, maintained that the economic case was overstated and that the problems identified were for Icelandic rather than European institutions to solve.

=== Security and geopolitics ===
Iceland is a founding member of NATO and the only ally without armed forces of its own, its defence resting on the alliance and on a bilateral defence agreement with the United States concluded in 1951. The country lies across the GIUK gap, the maritime corridor through which the Russian Northern Fleet reaches the open North Atlantic and increased Russian submarine activity there, together with uncertainty over the durability of transatlantic security guarantees, prompted renewed discussion of Iceland's strategic position. Particular attention was paid to statements by US president Donald Trump regarding American control of Greenland and to his conflation of Iceland with Greenland in an address at Davos in 2026.

Gunnarsdóttir argued that closer alignment with the EU would strengthen Iceland's resilience and widen its strategic options, framing the vote as a question of where a small state should place itself as established international arrangements came under strain: "in times like these, small nations need to think carefully about where they stand". Eiríkur Bergmann of Bifröst University noted that the reliability of the 1951 agreement was itself being reconsidered by many Icelanders, but observers on both sides of the argument agreed that these considerations shaped the context of the vote without driving it.

== Results ==
| Choice | Votes | % |
|---|---|---|
| For | 105,338 | 47.16 |
| Against | 118,047 | 52.84 |
| Total | 223,385 | 100.00 |
| Valid votes | 223,385 | 99.27 |
| Invalid votes | 749 | 0.33 |
| Blank votes | 897 | 0.40 |
| Total votes | 225,031 | 100.00 |
| Registered voters/turnout | 272,543 | 82.57 |
Source: National Electoral Commission

=== By constituency ===
| Constituency | Yes | | No | |
| Constituency | Votes | % | Votes | % |
|---|---|---|---|---|
| Reykjavík North | 22,226 | 57.5 | 16,448 | 42.5 |
| Reykjavík South | 20,738 | 54.5 | 17,317 | 45.5 |
| Southwest | 31,779 | 47.0 | 35,910 | 53.0 |
| Northwest | 7,060 | 37.1 | 11,953 | 62.9 |
| Northeast | 10,022 | 38.8 | 15,822 | 61.2 |
| South | 13,473 | 39.5 | 20,597 | 60.5 |
| Total | 105,338 | 47.2 | 118,047 | 52.8 |

== Reactions to the result ==
=== Domestic ===
Prime Minister Kristrún Frostadóttir, who had made the referendum a commitment of her coalition and had presented it as an opportunity that would not soon recur, had said before the vote that a No result would keep the membership question off the political agenda for the remainder of her term, which runs to 2028. Kristrún, Minister for Foreign Affairs Þorgerður Katrín Gunnarsdóttir and Minister of Education and Children Inga Sæland announced a joint press conference in Reykjavík on the afternoon of 30 August, at which the coalition leaders were to respond to the result.

Guðrún Hafsteinsdóttir, leader of the Independence Party and the most prominent figure in the No campaign, had rejected the economic argument advanced by supporters of renewed negotiations, saying that "these are not problems that Brussels will solve for us". She had also expressed scepticism that any accommodation offered by the European Union on fisheries would prove durable. After the referendum, Guðrún stressed that Iceland was not turning its back on its close ties with Europe.

Commentators noted an urban–rural political divide in the returns, with the two Reykjavík constituencies favouring renewed talks and rural constituencies opposing them by wider margins, a pattern generally attributed to the importance of fisheries and agriculture outside the capital area.

=== International ===
The outcome was reported as an unwelcome one for Brussels, where EU officials had regarded Iceland as a comparatively straightforward candidate whose accession might have reduced scepticism about further enlargement of the European Union and strengthened the bloc's position at a time of increased attention to Arctic security. The European Commission stated that it fully respected the democratic decision of Icelandic voters and that Iceland would continue to be a close partner of the European Union, especially through the EEA.

Eurosceptic politicians including Nigel Farage and Marine Le Pen welcomed the result.

=== Analysis ===
Eiríkur Bergmann of Bifröst University argued that the geopolitical context of the vote, including changing security arrangements in the North Atlantic, had not substantially entered the public debate and described the Yes campaign as "highly technical and, frankly, passionless". Domestic coverage during the campaign focused more heavily on interest rates, fishing rights and the cost of living than on security and geopolitical questions. According to Hulda Þórisdóttir, a politics professor at the University of Iceland, the fact that the No campaign was better funded contributed to the outcome of the referendum; Áfram Ísland (the primary organization backing the No campaign) spent 90 million krónur (equivalent to US$740 thousand), while SJÁ (the equivalent for the Yes campaign) spent 80 million kr. (equivalent to US$660 thousand).

== See also ==
- Potential enlargement of the European Union
- Proposed United States acquisition of Greenland
