= Next Icelandic parliamentary election =

- Before 30 November 2028
- All 63 seats in the Althing; 32 seats needed for a majority
Party	Leader	Current seats
Social Democratic	Kristrún Frostadóttir	15
Independence	Guðrún Hafsteinsdóttir	14
Viðreisn	Þorgerður Katrín Gunnarsdóttir	11
People's	Inga Sæland	10
Centre	Sigmundur Davíð Gunnlaugsson	8
Progressive	Lilja Dögg Alfreðsdóttir	5
Incumbent Prime Minister
Kristrún Frostadóttir; Social Democratic

Parliamentary elections will be held in Iceland by 2 December 2028 to elect the 63 members of the Althing.

== Opinion polls ==

Polling Firm	Fieldwork date	Sample	Response Rate	Parties										
Polling Firm	Fieldwork date	Sample	Response Rate	Government			Opposition			Extra-parliamentary			Oth.	Lead
Polling Firm	Fieldwork date	Sample	Response Rate	S	C	F	D	M	B	J	P	V	Oth.	Lead
Gallup	1–30 June 2026	12,102	38.5	26.2	11.4	4.6	24.9	15.1	5.3	4.3	3	5	-	1.3
Maskína	2–11 Jun 2026	1,705	–	25.2	12.4	4.1	22.7	14.2	8.5	3.9	3.5	5.4	-	2.5
Gallup	30 Apr – 31 May 2026	12,979	40.8	28.4	10.6	4	23.5	17.6	6.7	3	2	4.3	-	4.9
Gallup	1–29 Apr 2026	10,484	40.4	28.5	10.6	5.2	21.4	18.9	5.4	2	2	5.1	-	7.1
Maskína	25–31 Mar, 8–16 Apr 2026	1,786	–	27.7	12.8	5.8	18.1	16.4	7.2	3	4.7	4.3	-	7.1
Gallup	2–31 Mar 2026	10,746	42.3	30	10	5.8	19.5	20.6	4.7	2	3	4.3	-	9.4
Maskína	26 Feb – 3 Mar, 12–19 Mar 2026	2,617	–	25.5	14	5.8	16.1	18.4	7.1	3.5	5	4.4	-	7.1
Maskína	February 2026	1,993	–	27.2	13.4	4.8	16.2	19	7	3.1	5.2	4.1	-	8.2
Gallup	2 Feb – 1 Mar 2026	9,958	44.3	28.5	10.9	5.8	18.1	20.3	6.6	2	2.7	4.2	-	8.2
Prósent	21 Jan – 16 Feb 2026	3,900	50	30.1	13.5	7.7	13.7	19.6	5.9	2.4	3.6	3.3	-	10.5
Gallup	9 Jan – 1 Feb 2026	9,713	43.6	31.2	11.3	5.3	17.1	20.8	5.4	1.9	3.4	3.1	0.5	10.4
Maskína	9–13 Jan 2026	886	–	27	14.1	4.3	13.5	22.2	7.1	4.1	4.1	3.7	-	4.8
Gallup	1–28 Dec 2025	9,091	43.4	30.9	10.9	5.5	16.9	21.7	5.2	1.6	3.4	3.6	-	9.2
Gallup	3–30 Nov 2025	10,332	41.8	31.1	12.8	5.2	16.5	19.5	5.6	2.3	3.3	3.2	-	11.6
Gallup	1 Oct – 2 Nov 2025	11,225	46.5	31.9	13.5	5.9	17.6	16.3	5.5	2.3	3.9	2.6	-	14.3
Prósent	16–30 Sep 2025	2,000	50	32.0	14.4	7.6	18.3	9.9	7.1	2.7	5.2	2.1	0.7	13.7
Gallup	1–30 Sep 2025	10,887	43.1	34.0; 24	12.6; 9	6.9; 5	19.5; 14	11.8; 7	5.8; 4	2.1; 0	2.9; 0	3.6; 0	- -	14.5
Maskína	4–19 Sep 2025	–	–	31.9	14.3	6.3	18.6	9.1	6.3	3.5	5.8	4.1	0	13.3
Gallup	1–31 Aug 2025	10.055	44.5	34.6; 25	12.9; 9	7.4; 5	19.7; 14	10.7; 7	4.5; 2	1.9; 0	3.5; 1	3.7; 0	0.8; 0	14.9
Maskína	?-21 Aug 2025	–	–	31.6	16.1	6.3	18.6	9.6	6.5	2.6	4.5	4.2	0	13.0
Gallup	1–31 Jul 2025	11,541	43.6	34.7; 26	14.6; 10	6.7; 5	18.7; 13	10.5; 7	4.9; 2	2.4; 0	3.5; 0	3.4; 0	–	16.0
Maskína	4–23 Jul 2025	1,855	–	31.2	16.2	6.6	18.0	9.9	6.8	2.9	5.0	3.4	–	13.2
Gallup	2–30 Jun 2025	–	–	31.8; 23	13.7; 10	6.5; 4	20.6; 15	10.7; 7	5.6; 4	3.3; 0	4.1; 0	3.2; 0	–	11.2
Maskína	?–22 Jun 2025	–	–	28.1	15.3	6.6	17.3	13.0	7.0	4.4	4.6	3.7	–	10.8
Gallup	1 May – 1 Jun 2025	11,521	44.9	30.7; 22	14.4; 10	7.5; 5	21.7; 16	9.1; 6	5.5; 4	3.5; 0	3.3; 0	3.6; 0	–	9.0
Maskína	?–22 May 2025	1,962	–	27.4	16.8	7.2	18.9	9.7	6.8	5.0	4.6	3.6	–	8.5
Gallup	1–30 Apr 2025	10,005	46.7	29.4; 21	13.9; 10	7.4; 5	22.3; 16	8.9; 6	6.1; 4	4.7; 1	3.2; 0	3.3; 0	0.7; 0	7.1
Maskína	?–22 Apr 2025	1,453	–	26.2	15.8	7.9	20.9	10.3	7.2	4.9	3.9	2.9	–	5.3
Gallup	3–31 Mar 2025	10,324	47.5	27.0; 19	14.6; 10	7.7; 5	22.4; 16	9.3; 6	5.7; 4	5.4; 3	4.0; 0	3.3; 0	0.6; 0	4.6
Maskína	5–19 Mar 2025	1,899	–	23.3	14.8	8.5	24.3	10.9	6.8	4.9	3.1	3.3	–	1.0
Gallup	3 Feb – 2 Mar 2025	9,652	47.2	26.0; 18	14.1; 10	8.3; 5	21.5; 15	10.1; 7	6.3; 4	6.2; 4	3.6; 0	3.1; 0	–	4.5
Maskína	?–26 Feb 2025	2,899	–	21.9	14.9	9.1	21.4	11.5	7.3	5.5	3.2	2.8	2.5	0.5
Gallup	2 Jan – 2 Feb 2025	10,908	48.6	21.7; 15	16.2; 11	10.6; 7	20.5; 14	12.7; 9	6.7; 4	5.2; 3	3.5; 0	2.2; 0	0.8; 0	1.2
Maskína	9–14 Jan 2025	966	–	22.2	14.0	12.9	19.3	11.6	7.2	4.1	3.6	3.1	1.9	2.9
Gallup	16 Dec – 1 Jan 2025	3,460	50.1	21.4; 15	13.8; 9	13.1; 9	20.1; 14	12.4; 8	6.3; 4	6.0; 4	3.1; 0	2.1; 0	1.6; 0	1.3
Maskína	5–19 Dec 2024	2,803	–	23.1	16.5	10.6	16.3	9.0	8.4	6.0	5.2	3.8	1.1	6.6
2024 election	30 Nov 2024	–	–	20.75; 15	15.82; 11	13.78; 10	19.36; 14	12.10; 8	7.80; 5	3.96; 0	3.02; 0	2.34; 0	1.06; 0	1.4
