= Cabinet of Kristrún Frostadóttir =

Government of Iceland since December 2024

First cabinet of Kristrún Frostadóttir
- 48th Cabinet of Iceland
- 2024–present
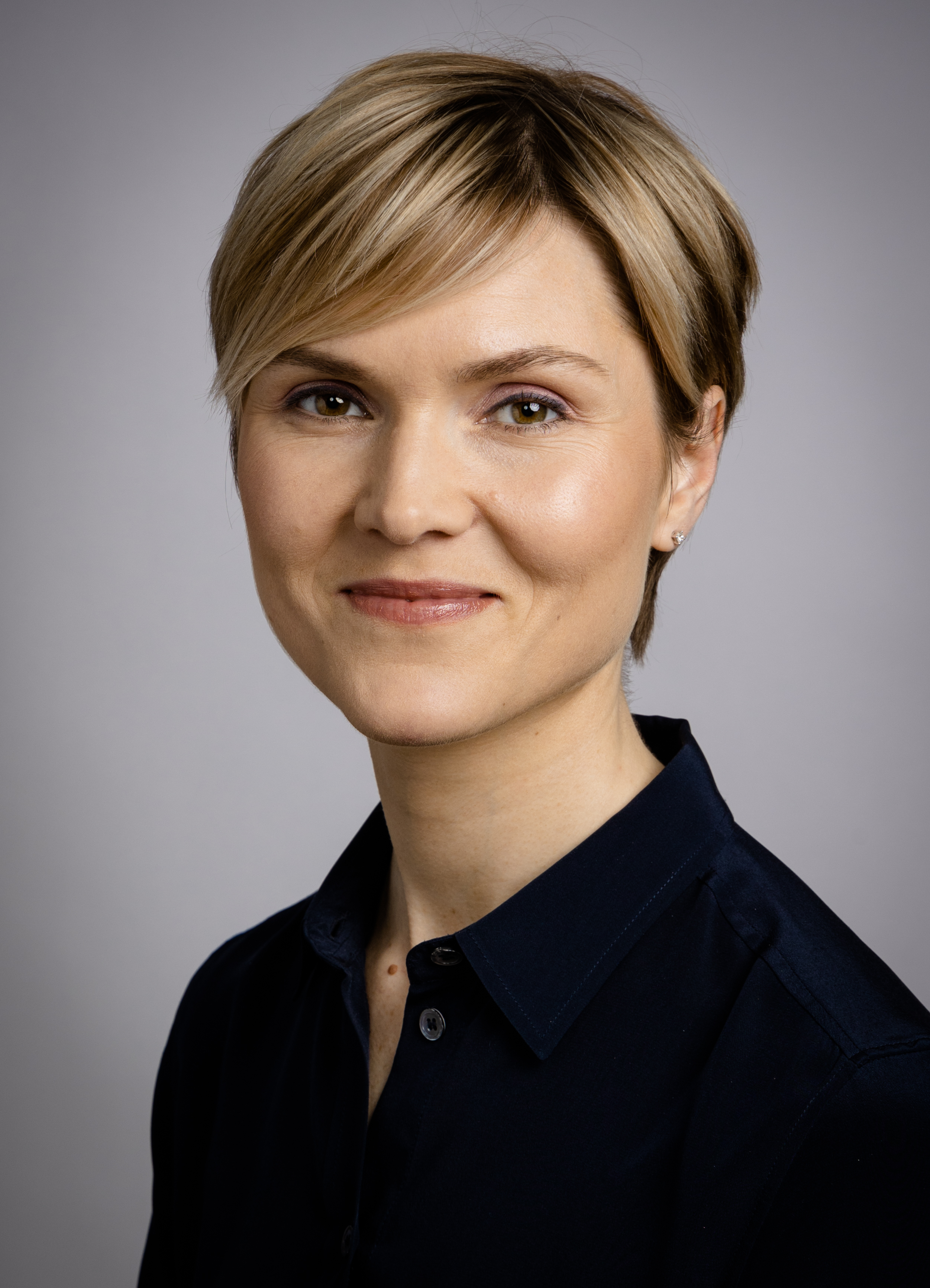
- Date formed: 21 December 2024

People and organisations
- President: Halla Tómasdóttir
- Prime Minister: Kristrún Frostadóttir
- No. of ministers: 11
- Member parties: Social Democratic Alliance (S); Viðreisn (C); People's Party (F)
- Status in legislature: Majority government (coalition)
- Opposition parties: Independence Party (D); Centre Party (M); Progressive Party (B)

History
- Election: 2024 parliamentary election
- Predecessor: Bjarni Benediktsson II

The Cabinet of Kristrún Frostadóttir, nicknamed “The Valkyrie government” (Icelandic: Valkyrjustjórnin), was formed on 21 December 2024, following the 2024 Icelandic parliamentary election. The cabinet is led by Kristrún Frostadóttir of the Social Democratic Alliance. The ministers of the cabinet formally took office on 21 December.

The cabinet is a coalition government consisting of the Social Democratic Alliance, the Viðreisn and the People's Party. Together they hold 36 of the 63 seats in the Parliament of Iceland and serve as a majority government. There are eleven ministers in the cabinet, four each from the Social Democratic Alliance and from Viðreisn, and three from the People's Party.

== Cabinet ==
The Cabinet is composed as follows:

Cabinet members
| Portfolio | Minister | Took office | Left office | Party |
|---|---|---|---|---|
| Prime Minister | Kristrún Frostadóttir | 21 December 2024 | Incumbent | Social Democratic |
| Minister for Foreign Affairs | Þorgerður Katrín Gunnarsdóttir | 21 December 2024 | Incumbent | Viðreisn |
| Minister of Social Affairs and Housing | Inga Sæland | 21 December 2024 | 11 January 2026 | People's |
| Minister of Social Affairs and Housing | Ragnar Þór Ingólfsson | 11 January 2026 | Incumbent | People's |
| Minister of Finance and Economic Affairs | Daði Már Kristófersson (Note: Daði is not a member of the Althing.) | 21 December 2024 | Incumbent | Viðreisn |
| Minister of Transport and Local Government | Eyjólfur Ármannsson | 21 December 2024 | Incumbent | People's |
| Minister for the Environment, Energy and Climate | Jóhann Páll Jóhannsson | 21 December 2024 | Incumbent | Social Democratic |
| Minister of Culture, Innovation and Universities; Minister for Nordic Cooperation | Logi Már Einarsson | 21 December 2024 | Incumbent | Social Democratic |
| Minister of Education and Children | Ásthildur Lóa Þórsdóttir | 21 December 2024 | 20 March 2025 | People's |
| Minister of Education and Children | Guðmundur Ingi Kristinsson | 23 March 2025 | 11 January 2026 | People's |
| Minister of Education and Children | Inga Sæland | 11 January 2026 | Incumbent | People's |
| Minister of Health | Alma Möller | 21 December 2024 | Incumbent | Social Democratic |
| Minister of Justice | Þorbjörg Sigríður Gunnlaugsdóttir | 21 December 2024 | Incumbent | Viðreisn |
| Minister of Industries | Hanna Katrín Friðriksson | 21 December 2024 | Incumbent | Viðreisn |

== Coalition priorities ==
Key policies were announced by the coalition government leaders:

- Key government commitments:
  - Housing security: Ensuring housing stability for citizens.
  - Poverty alleviation: Implementing measures to eliminate poverty.
  - Savings in administration: Rationalising state spending and simplifying the tax system.
  - Infrastructure investments: Developing infrastructure, including healthcare and social systems.
  - Support for the Icelandic language: Initiatives to protect and promote the language. Enhancing support for migrants learning Icelandic.
  - Strengthen energy infrastructure and simplify the permitting process.
  - Achieve climate neutrality by 2040, promote biodiversity, and protect marine areas.
  - Holding a referendum on resuming negotiations for a potential accession of Iceland into the European Union, targeting to be held in 2027.
- New initiatives:
  - Streamlining public administration.
  - Simplifying the tax system and eliminating exceptions.
  - Formulating policies on natural resources and their sustainable use.
  - Expanding transportation, including the construction of road tunnels.
  - Reducing the impact of indexation on the economy.
- Priorities mentioned by the Social Democratic Alliance (S):
  - Economic stabilisation.
  - Lowering interest rates.
  - Responsible public financial management.
  - Overcoming stagnation and supporting economic growth remain priorities.
  - Funding for initiatives would come from cost rationalisation and improving the efficiency of the tax system.
  - No plans to increase VAT in tourism but to introduce fees for managing access to certain tourist attractions.
  - Progressive fees or an analysis of income bases in fishing fees are being considered.
- Priorities mentioned by Viðreisn (C):
  - Streamlining public administration and reducing the number of ministries.
  - No increases in taxes, including income and capital gains taxes.
  - Introducing regulations for artificial intelligence.
  - Implementing new fees for accessing Iceland's natural attractions.
  - Increasing the number of police officers and strengthening public.
- Priorities mentioned by the People's Party (F):
  - Increasing the tax-free income threshold to ISK 60,000.
  - Introducing a lifetime pension for people with disabilities.
  - Establishing an ombudsman for the elderly.
  - Improving social support systems.
  - Addressing discrepancies between wages and pensions.
  - Strengthening the healthcare system.
  - Improving educational access for people with disabilities.
  - Revising immigration policies based on Nordic models.
