= Ragnar Þór Ingólfsson =

Icelandic politician (born 1973)

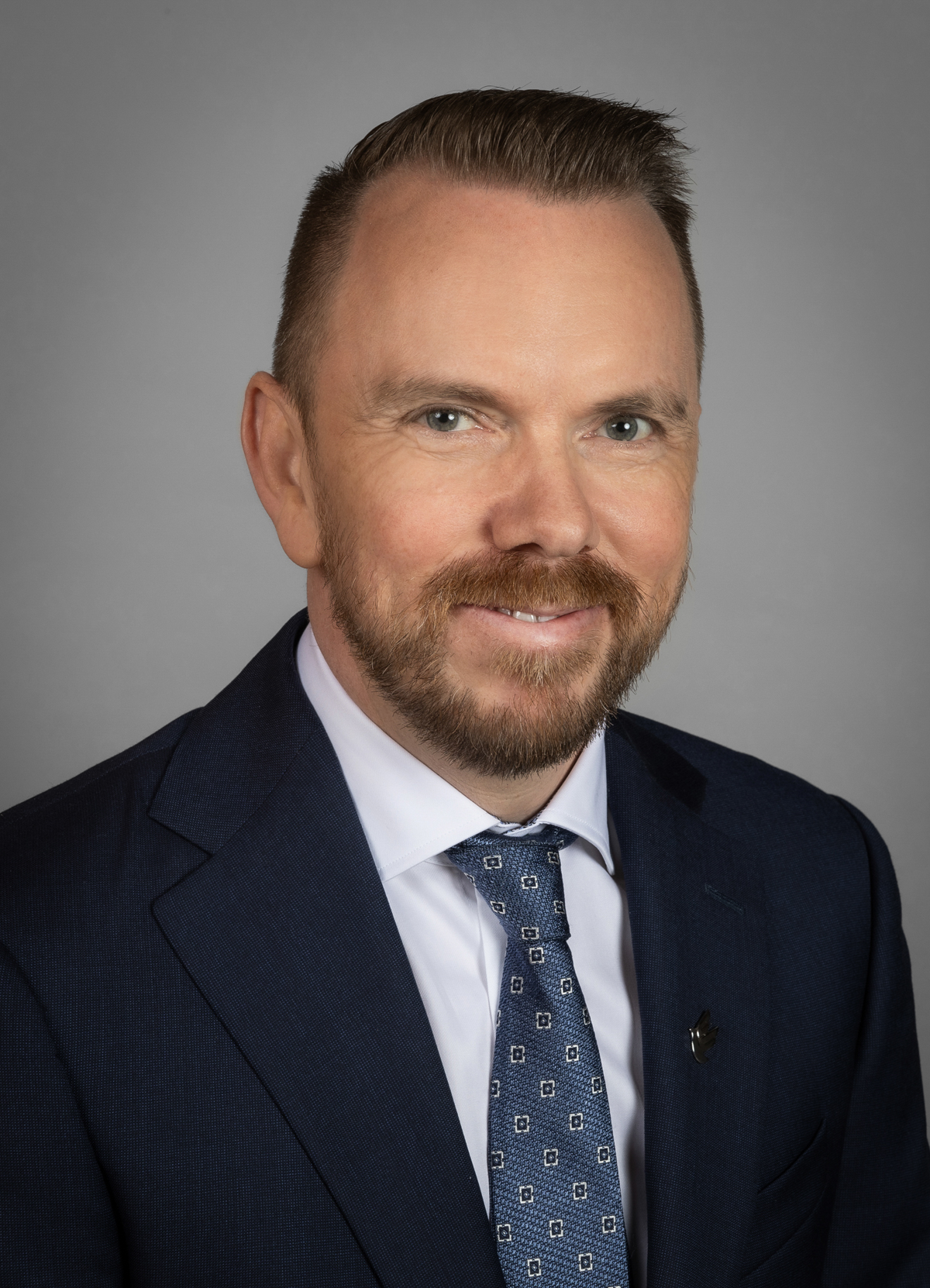

Minister of Social Affairs and Housing
- Incumbent
- Assumed office 11 January 2026
- Prime Minister: Kristrún Frostadóttir
- Preceded by: Inga Sæland

Member of the Althing
- Incumbent
- Assumed office 2024
- Constituency: Reykjavík North

Personal details
- Party: People's Party

Ragnar Þór Ingólfsson (born 17 May 1973) is an Icelandic politician from the People's Party. In the 2024 Icelandic parliamentary election he was elected to the Althing. Ragnar has served as the Minister of Social Affairs and Housing in the cabinet of Kristrún Frostadóttir since 2026.

== See also ==
- List of members of the Althing, 2024–2028
