= Inga Sæland =

Icelandic lawyer and politician

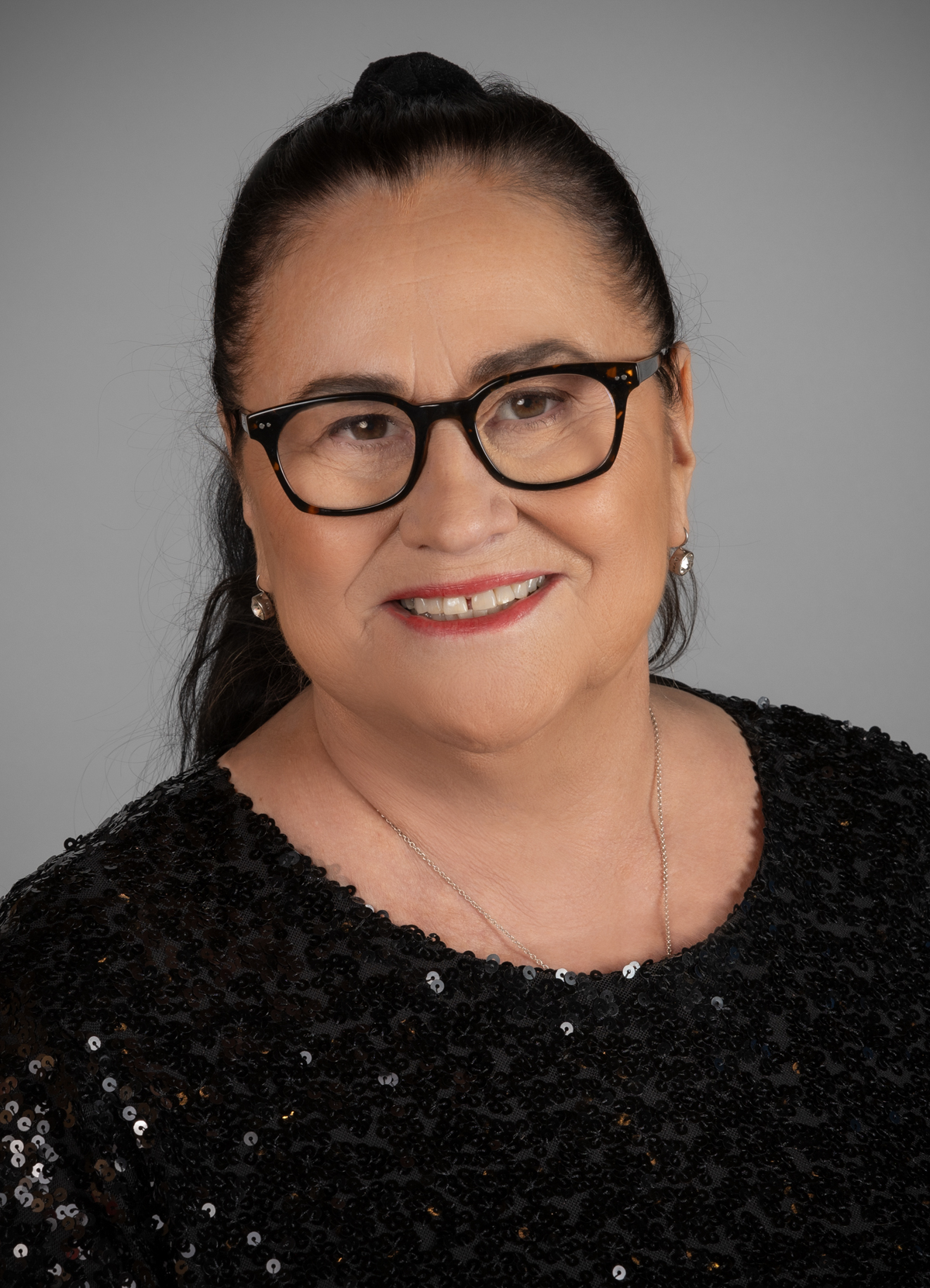
- Official portrait, 2025

Minister of Education and Children's Affairs
- Incumbent
- Assumed office 11 January 2026
- Prime Minister: Kristrún Frostadóttir
- Preceded by: Guðmundur Ingi Kristinsson

Minister of Social Affairs and Housing
- In office 21 December 2024 – 11 January 2026
- Prime Minister: Kristrún Frostadóttir
- Preceded by: Bjarni Benediktsson (Social Affairs and Labour Market)
- Succeeded by: Ragnar Þór Ingólfsson

Chairperson of the People's Party
- Incumbent
- Assumed office 27 January 2016
- Preceded by: Party established

Member of the Althing
- Incumbent
- Assumed office 28 October 2017
- Constituency: Reykjavík South

Personal details
- Born: 3 August 1959 (age 67) Ólafsfjörður, Iceland
- Party: People's Party (2016–present)
- Other political affiliations: Social Democratic Alliance (formerly)
- Spouse: Óli Már Guðmundsson
- Children: 4
- Education: University of Iceland (LLB)

Inga Sæland (born 3 August 1959) is an Icelandic politician. She is the founder and current leader of the People's Party, and has served as a member of the Althing since her election in 2017. Inga has served as the Minister of Education and Children's Affairs in the cabinet of Kristrún Frostadóttir since 2026, and previously served as Minister of Social Affairs and Housing from 2024 until 2026.

== Early life ==
Inga was born in Ólafsfjörður as the second of four children. For the first two years of her life, Inga was blind after suffering damage to her brain stem due to incorrect medication taken after contracting chickenpox and meningitis. In her adulthood, Inga is legally blind with 10% of her vision remaining. Inga was raised in an impoverished family, and has stated that her political beliefs are influenced by this upbringing.

Inga graduated with a Bachelor of Laws degree from the University of Iceland in 2016, and had previously studied political science at the university from 2003 to 2006. Inga was a contestant in the Icelandic version of the singing competition programme The X Factor in 2006, ultimately placing fifth in the competition.

== Political career ==
Inga founded the People's Party in 2016, a populist political party intended to advocate for Icelanders who "have suffered injustices, differences, lawlessness and poverty". The party has been cited as syncretic, with left-wing stances on disability rights and poverty, and right-wing stances on other issues such as immigration. As a politician, Inga has described herself as a populist and compared herself to the French politician Marine Le Pen.

Inga was elected to the Althing in the 2017 parliamentary election for the Reykjavík South constituency. In 2018, the party was involved in the Klaustur Affair, when party members Karl Gauti Hjaltason and Ólafur Ísleifsson were secretly recorded making disparaging comments about Inga along with former prime minister Sigmundur Davíð Gunnlaugsson and other politicians of the Centre Party. As a result of the scandal, both Karl and Ólafur were expelled from the People's Party and joined the Centre Party.

Inga was reelected in the 2021 and 2024 parliamentary elections. The party saw their best performance in the latter election, even winning the most votes of any party in the South constituency. Following the 2024 election, Kristrún Frostadóttir of the Social Democratic Alliance announced her intention to negotiate a coalition government with the People's Party and Viðreisn. The coalition agreement was later signed between Inga, Kristrún, and Þorgerður Katrín Gunnarsdóttir of Viðreisn in December 2024, and Inga was appointed by Kristrún to serve as Minister of Social Affairs and Housing in her cabinet. In January 2026, she was appointed as Minister of Education and Children after Guðmundur Ingi Kristinsson resigned due to health issues. She was succeeded as social affairs minister by Ragnar Þór Ingólfsson.

== Personal life ==
Inga is married to Óli Már Guðmundsson, with whom she has four children and five grandchildren.
