= Guðmundur Ingi Kristinsson =

Icelandic politician (born 1955)

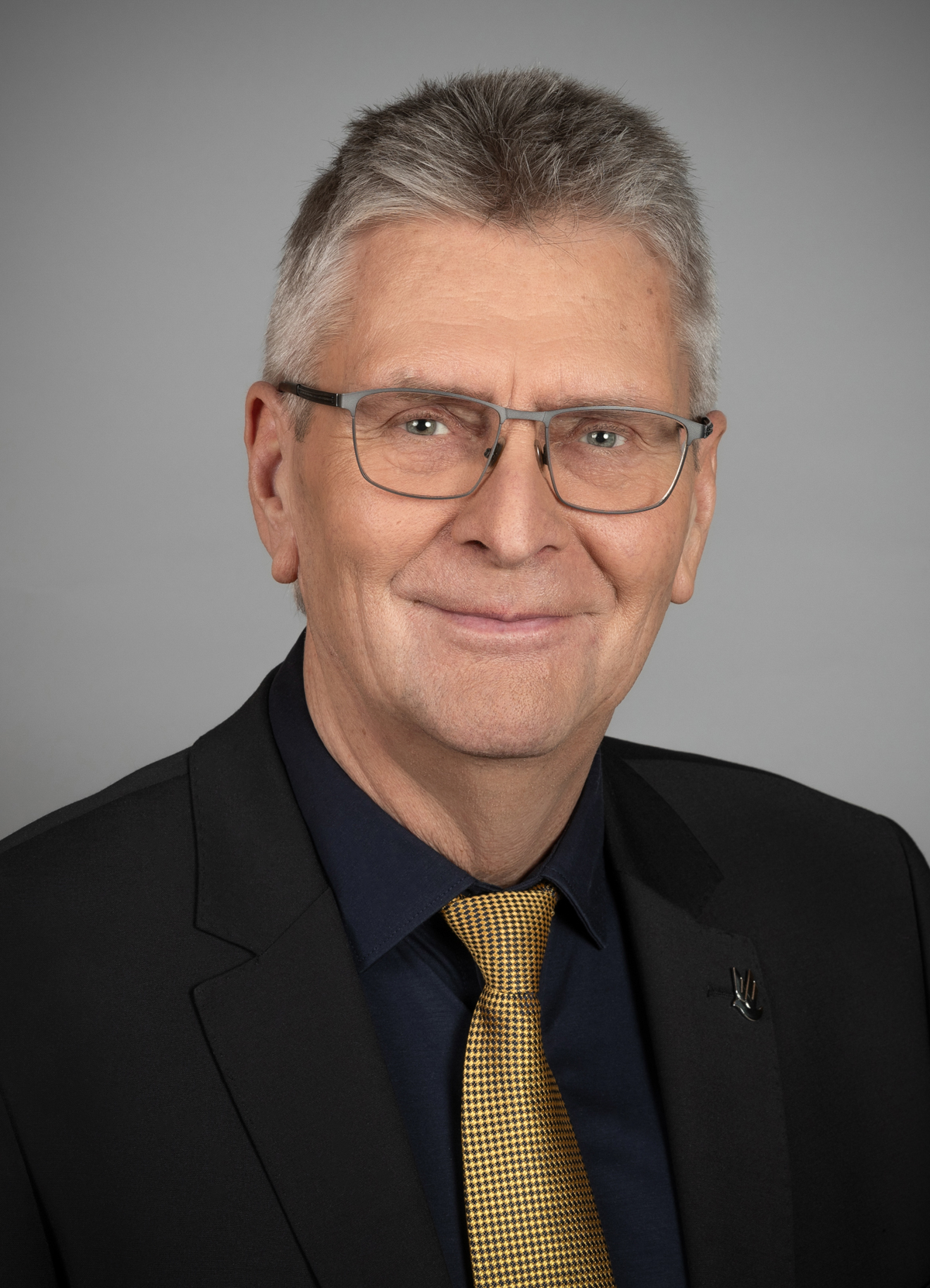
- Official portrait, 2025

Minister of Education and Children's Affairs
- In office 23 March 2025 – 11 January 2026
- Prime Minister: Kristrún Frostadóttir
- Preceded by: Ásthildur Lóa Þórsdóttir
- Succeeded by: Inga Sæland

Member of the Althing
- Incumbent
- Assumed office 28 October 2017
- Constituency: Southwest

Personal details
- Born: 14 July 1955 (age 70) Reykjavík, Iceland
- Party: People's
- Spouse(s): Inga Dóra Jónsdóttir (divorced); Hulda Margrét Baldursdóttir
- Children: 6

Guðmundur Ingi Kristinsson (born 14 July 1955) is an Icelandic politician from the People's Party. He was born in Reykjavík and has represented the Southwest constituency in the Althing, the Icelandic parliament, since 2017. He has served as the Minister of Education and Children's Affairs from March 2025 until January 2026, when he resigned due to health issues. He had been on sick leave since December 2025.
