= International reactions to the Greenland crisis =

Many uninvolved governments, particularly in Europe, made public responses to the Greenland crisis—as well as the European Union. The diplomatic crisis was precipitated by the United States' threats to annex Greenland, a Danish territory, in late 2025 and early 2026.

== European Union and NATO members ==
=== Members supporting Denmark ===
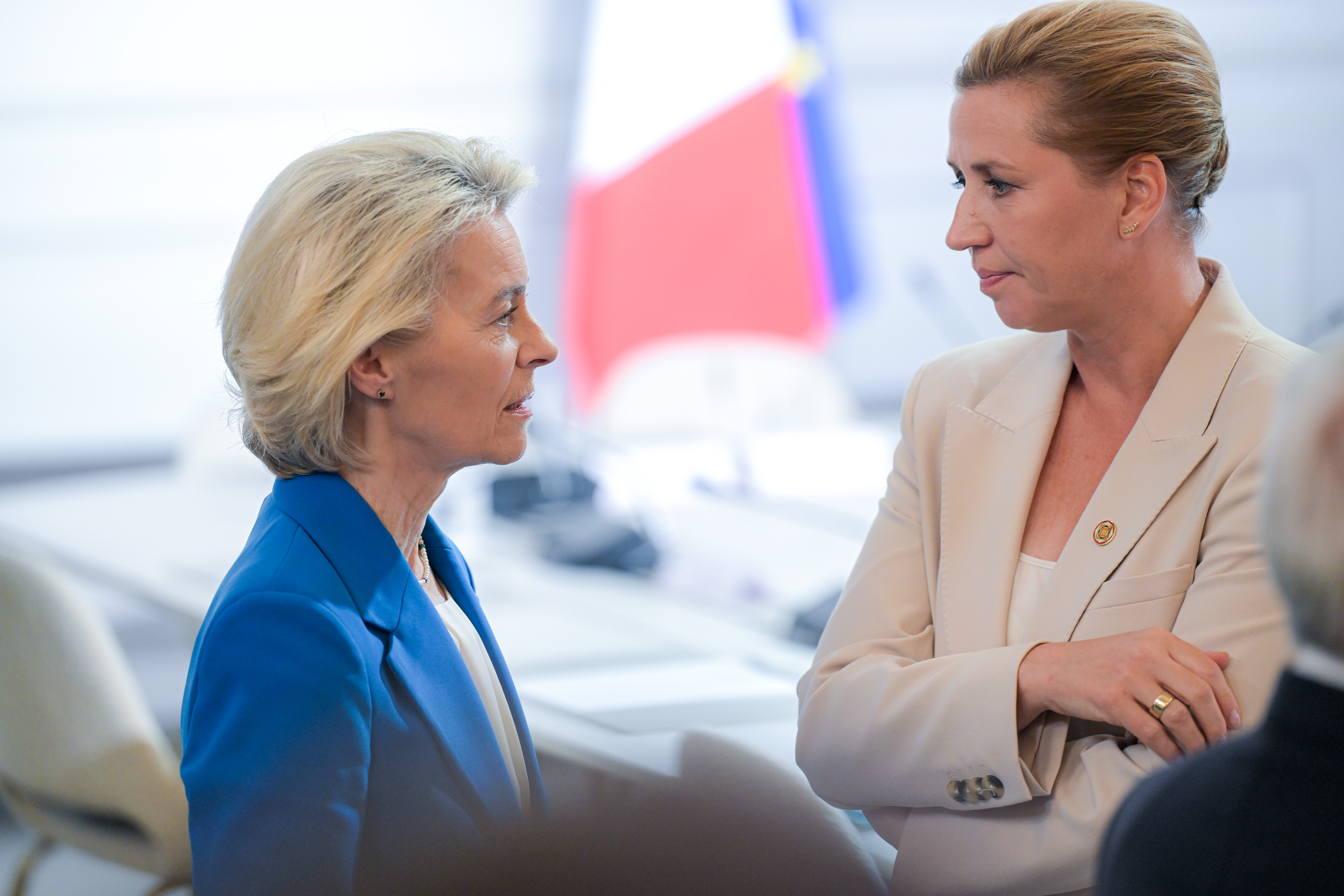
Danish Prime Minister Mette Frederiksen (right) urged "the United States to cease its threats against a historically close ally", while European Commission President Ursula von der Leyen (left) said that the EU stands in "full solidarity with Denmark and the people of Greenland".

The EU, the United Kingdom, Norway, and Canada have united behind Denmark, and condemned the US threats. The European Commission President Ursula von der Leyen said that the EU stands in "full solidarity with Denmark and the people of Greenland" against US threats. EU Defence Commissioner Andrius Kubilius warned that it would be the end of NATO if the US invaded Greenland and said that EU members would be under obligation to come to Denmark's assistance. European countries have united behind Denmark, emphasizing that Greenland belongs to its people, not to the United States.

European Council President António Costa said the EU would support Greenland and ‍Denmark when ‍needed and that the EU would not accept violations of international law. European allies said they are working on a plan to support Denmark. EU lawmakers have called for freezing a proposed trade deal with the US.

A joint statement, dated 6 January 2026, by President Emmanuel Macron of France, Chancellor Friedrich Merz of Germany, Prime Minister Giorgia Meloni of Italy, Prime Minister Donald Tusk of Poland, Prime Minister Pedro Sánchez of Spain, Prime Minister Keir Starmer of the United Kingdom and Prime Minister Mette Frederiksen of Denmark emphasised "sovereignty, territorial integrity and the inviolability of borders" and said that "Greenland belongs to its people. It is for Denmark and Greenland, and them only, to decide on matters concerning Denmark and Greenland." A joint statement by foreign ministers of the Nordic countries have echoed the same message. Greenland's Prime Minister Jens-Frederik Nielsen thanked the European allies for their support. Former NATO secretary-general Anders Fogh Rasmussen said Trump speaks like a gangster in his threats against Greenland. He also stated that time for "flattering Trump" was over while suggesting hard economic actions by Europe.

Private text message sent to Donald Trump

"From président [sic] Macron to President Trump,

My friend,

We are totally in line on Syria

We can do great things on Iran

I do not understand what you are doing on Greenland"

— French President Emmanuel Macron

Ursula von der Leyen said in a speech at the World Economic Forum on 20 January that geopolitical "shocks" and Trump's worldview require a "new form of European independence." She underlined that the sovereignty and integrity of the Kingdom of Denmark including Greenland is non-negotiable.

==== Belgium ====
At the Davos World Economic Forum, Belgian Prime Minister Bart De Wever said that Europe cannot be a "miserable slave to Trump." De Wever also stated that the US should be regarded as an ally only if it acts as one, warning that eight decades of Atlanticism could be nearing an end. He added that the situation was unprecedented in that a NATO member was threatening another NATO member with military action.

==== Canada ====
In January 2026, Canadian Prime Minister Mark Carney said Canada would "always support the sovereignty and territorial integrity of Denmark, including Greenland". Canadian foreign minister Anita Anand announced Canada would open a consulate in Nuuk and Governor-General Mary Simon would travel to Greenland and Denmark to show their support for a key Arctic ally. On 16 January 2026, Carney said that the "future of Greenland is a decision for Greenland and for the Kingdom of Denmark". He emphasised that a decision on who owns Greenland does not belong to Trump. Additionally, Canada is considering deploying a small number of troops to Greenland to participate in military exercises as part of contingency planning. Meanwhile the Royal Canadian Air Force continues pre-planned joint military exercises in Greenland with the United States Armed Forces as part of routine North American Aerospace Defense Command (NORAD) operations.

PM Carney also remarked that US-dominated world order was over and was "not coming back" during a speech at the World Economic Forum while warning about "an era of great power rivalry." Apart from Canadian issues, the speech was also perceived as a rebuke of Trump's efforts to acquire Greenland over which Trump later disinvited Carney from his proposed Board of Peace.

==== Croatia ====
The Croatian government released a statement calling on NATO allies to respect each other's sovereignty and reaffirming that Greenland is part of Denmark.

==== Estonia ====
Prior to the start of the Arctic Endurance mission, Estonian prime minister Kristen Michal stated that "Greenland’s future is for Greenlanders and the Kingdom of Denmark to decide, not anyone else".

==== Finland ====
Finnish president Alexander Stubb signed a letter confirming his country's view that Greenland's future is to be decided by the Danish and Greenlandic people. In an interview with the Washington Post, he further stated that Europe stood at a cross road.

==== France ====
Also speaking at the World Economic Forum, Emmanuel Macron talked about a shift towards a new world where "international law is trampled", and directly addressed the United States as having "trade agreements that undermine our export interests, [...] openly aim to weaken and subordinate Europe, combined with an endless accumulation of new tariffs [...] used as leverage against territorial sovereignty."

==== Germany ====
German Foreign Minister Johann Wadephul said Greenland would be defended by NATO, and German Vice Chancellor Lars Klingbeil said "it is solely up to Denmark and Greenland to decide about Greenland's future. Territorial sovereignty and integrity must be respected."

==== Greece ====
Greek prime minister Kyriakos Mitsotakis stated that his country fully supported the letter of support concerning the sovereignty of Denmark and Greenland.

==== Italy ====
Italian prime minister Giorgia Meloni cosigned a letter stating that Greenland's future should be decided by Greenland and Denmark alone. However, the country refused to send troops to Greenland to support the Arctice Endurance mission.

==== Norway ====
Norwegian prime minister Jonas Gahr Støre stated that Greenland is a part of Denmark. Upon receiving a letter from Donald Trump complaining about the Nobel prize, he suggested de-escalation and a partnership with Finland.

==== Iceland ====
On 5 January 2026, RÚV reported that Prime Minister Kristrún Frostadóttir had expressed support for Greenland and Denmark, though she did not mention the United States or Donald Trump outright. On the same day, Þorgerður Katrín Gunnarsdóttir, the Minister for Foreign Affairs, wrote in Vísir that while Iceland's bilateral defence agreement with the US remains unchanged, she advises the nation to preserve their vigilance and safeguarding of Icelandic interests, and urged a discussion of Iceland's position in a state of uncertainty prevailing "in our immediate environment". On 14 January 2026, the government sent two officers of the Icelandic Coast Guard to Greenland. On 14 January 2026, nominee for the ambassador of the US to Iceland, Billy Long, joked that Iceland should become the 52nd state of the United States; he apologised for the remark. On January 21, 2026 at the 56th World Economic Forum, Trump repeatedly referred to Greenland as "Iceland", threatening to seize control of the island.

==== Poland ====
Polish prime minister Donald Tusk stated that he supported Denmark's sovereignty over Greenland. However, he also stated that he would send troops and wanted to avoid any rifts in NATO.

==== Slovenia ====
In a government meeting, Slovenian prime minister Robert Golob stated that the issues of Greenland "can only be decided by Denmark and Greenland".

==== Spain ====
Spanish prime Pedro Sánchez was a signatory of the joint statement from 6 January 2026 stating that Greenlanders and Danes should decide their fate. He further stated that a US invasion of Greenland would make Putin the happiest man on earth.

==== Sweden ====
Swedish prime minister Ulf Kristersson stated that he was highly critical of US rhetoric on Greenland.

==== United Kingdom ====
British Prime Minister Keir Starmer has backed Denmark as a close ally within NATO and Europe. British Defence Secretary John Healey said that the UK would never help the US invade Greenland. Starmer said the UK will not yield to Trump's pressure on Greenland.

=== Members not supporting Denmark ===
==== Albania ====
Albanian minister Bledi Çuçi issued a composed statement. He urged all parties to prioritize peaceful negotiations.

==== Czech Republic ====
When asked about the matter, Czech prime minister Andrej Babiš stated that he could not say that Czechia stands behind Greenland. He further stated that he understood Donald Trump's argument concerning the island's importance for the US.

==== Hungary ====
Hungarian minister of foreign affairs and trade Péter Szijjártó stated that it was a bilateral issue. He further stated that the EU should not be involved. Hungary also declined to sign a joint statement from the EU.

==== Slovakia ====
After meeting with Donald Trump, Slovak prime minister Robert Fico did not express solidarity with Greenland. He further stated that both he and Trump were critical of the EU.

==== Turkey ====
The Turkish foreign minister Hakan Fidan stated that the Turkey "welcomed U.S.-Denmark-Greenland talks" and that his country was monitoring the situation carefully.

== Other international reactions ==
=== China ===
On 18 January 2026, Chinese foreign ministry spokesman Guo Jiakun deplored the tariff threats made to European nations over Greenland, rejecting days later that China would compete for influence in the West. At the Davos' World Economic Forum China’s Vice Premier He Lifeng positioned his country as a champion of the rules-based international order, in a speech that indirectly attacked the Trump administration.

=== India ===
India's foreign secretary Vikram Misri stated that India was closely monitoring the situation.

=== Russia ===
Russia affirmed that it considers Greenland to be a Danish territory. On 20 January, Russia's foreign minister Sergey Lavrov called Greenland "not a natural part of Denmark", but said the US knew that Russia had no interest in the island. Russian foreign ministry spokeswoman Maria Zakharova mocked the EU, saying it should react to the proposed US annexation of Greenland as it did to Russia's 2014 annexation of Crimea. Russia's ambassador to Denmark, Vladimir Barbin, accused Denmark and Greenland of being "anti-Russian". Former Russian president Dmitry Medvedev jokingly suggested Trump should "hurry up" or Greenland might choose to join Russia instead. Kremlin spokesman Dmitry Peskov said that Russia was monitoring the situation, calling it "extraordinary" and "unusual".

On 19 January 2026, the Chuvashian branch of the Communist Party of the Russian Federation, Alexander Andreyev, held up a sign saying "Greenland, we are with you! We are Greenland!" while performing his traditional Epiphany ice plunge. He later stated that "On a remote northern island, the local Communist Party enjoys great popularity. We decided to demonstrate our solidarity with Eskimo workers in their struggles against American imperialism," referring to members of Greenland's democratic socialist party Inuit Ataqatigiit.

In March 2025, Russian president Vladimir Putin appeared to endorse Trump's vision to take over Greenland, stating that it is "a deep mistake to believe that this is some kind of extravagant talk by the new American administration", citing past US attempts to purchase Greenland since 1910 which he called "serious" with "longstanding historical roots" and comparing the situation to the 1867 Alaska Purchase.

== See also ==
- Denmark–United States relations
- International reactions to the 2026 United States intervention in Venezuela
