= Social Democratic Youth (Iceland) =

Youth branch of political party

Social Democratic Youth Ungt jafnaðarfólk
- President: Lilja Hrönn Önnudóttir Hrannarsdóttir
- Founded: 2000
- Headquarters: Reykjavík, Iceland
- Ideology: Social democracy
- Mother party: Social Democratic Alliance
- International affiliation: International Union of Socialist Youth
- European affiliation: Young European Socialists
- Nordic affiliation: Forbundet Nordens Socialdemokratiske Ungdom (FNSU)
- Website: politik.is

Social Democratic Youth (Icelandic: Ungt jafnaðarfólk) is the youth branch of the Social Democratic Alliance of Iceland.
