= The Greens (Iceland) =

The Greens Græningjar
- Leader: Kikka Sigurðardóttir
- Parliamentary leader: Bjarni Jónsson
- Founder: Kikka Sigurðardóttir
- Founded: 20 October 2024
- Split from: Left-Green Movement (partly)
- Ideology: Green politics
- Political position: Centre-left
- Colours: Green
- Althing: 0 / 63

Election symbol
- G

Website
- Official website

The Greens (Icelandic: Græningjar) is a green Icelandic political party established on 20 October 2024 by Kikka Sigurðardóttir. The main policies of the party are to establish a highland national park and to ensure the protection of the environment and to bring measures against climate change. The party had representation in the Althing through an MP who left the Left-Green Movement, Bjarni Jónsson, though Bjarni did not retain his seat at the 2024 parliamentary election.

== History ==
The Greens' founding assembly was held on 20 October 2024. The party announced that it would run in the southern and northern Reykjavik constituencies, as well as in the north-eastern constituency.

On 27 October, Althing member Bjarni Jónsson, who had recently left the Left-Green Movement, joined The Greens, giving them parliamentary representation. He said The Greens "are a growing movement in which environmental and nature conservation issues have sincere and determined supporters, but today such a party is not to be found in the Althing".

On 30 October, the party announced that it had decided not to participate in the 2024 parliamentary election. Instead, the party intends to participate in the 2026 municipal elections.

== Ideology ==
The party focuses on environmental issues, and Kikka Sigurðardóttir says that the party was primarily founded around those issues. The party plans to focus on fighting climate change and "our resources, which we are handing out left and right to anyone who wants to manage them". In her opinion, the Greens hope to become "as huge as other green parties in Europe".

Kikka Sigurðardóttir says The Greens are willing to cooperate with the Left-Green Movement, but believes they have not done a good enough job. She says Iceland's environment and the climate crisis were not their main issues in parliament and that "they couldn't even implement their own climate plan when they were in government".
