= Lenya Rún Taha Karim =

Icelandic politician (born 1999)

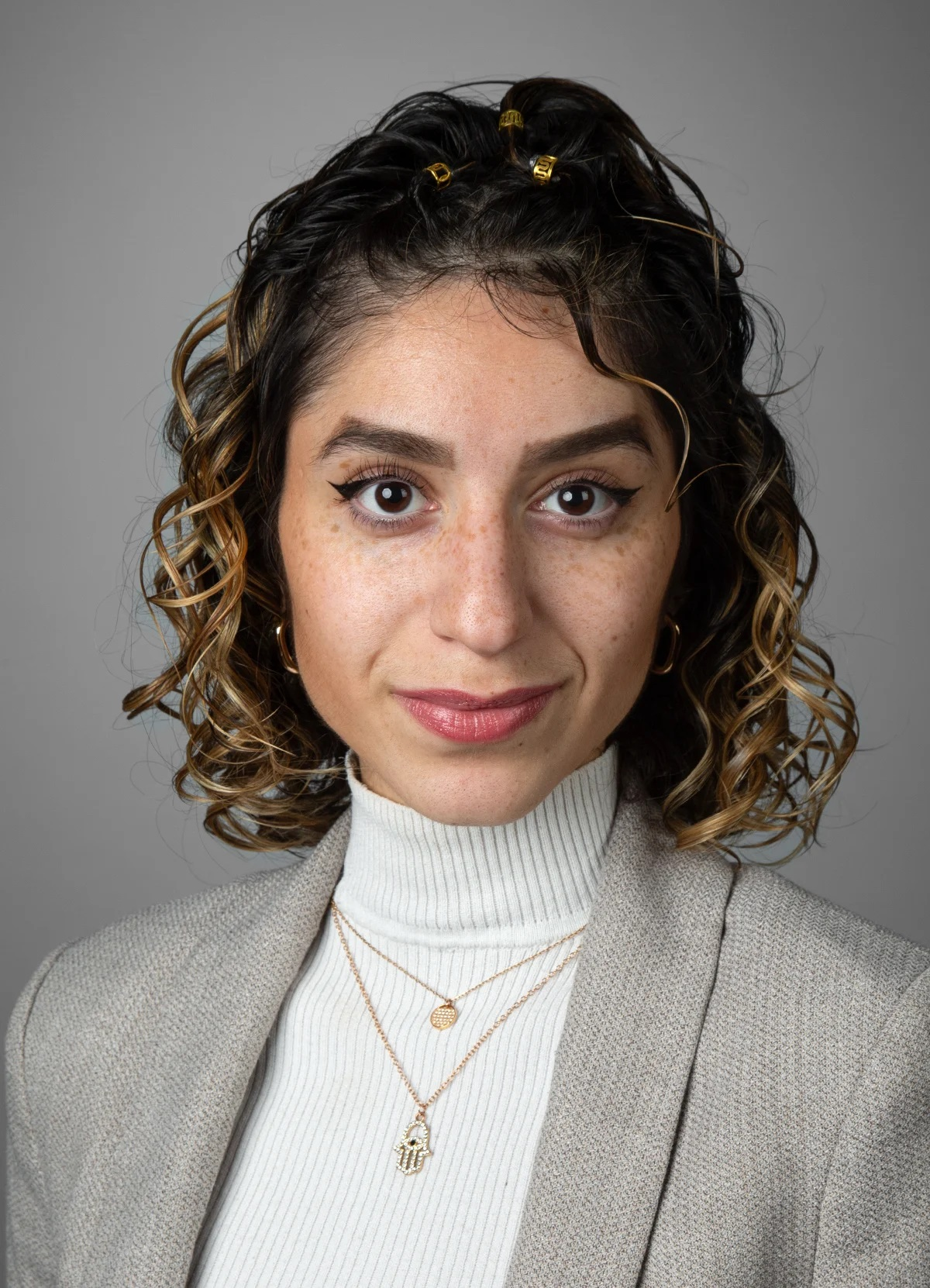

Personal details
- Born: 18 December 1999 (age 26) Kópavogur, Iceland
- Party: Pirate Party

Lenya Rún Taha Karim (born 18 December 1999) is an Icelandic politician for the Pirate Party.

== Early life ==
Lenya Rún was born in Kópavogur in 1999 to Kurdish immigrants. Her father migrated to Iceland in 1993 and her mother in 1996. She went to school in Iceland, but the family returned to Kurdistan for three years in 2013. She is currently a law student at the University of Iceland.

== Political career ==
Lenya Rún advocates for an embetterment of the rights for the asylum seekers, the legalization of drugs and a solution of the climate crisis. Following the Icelandic parliamentary election on 25 September 2021, it was announced that she had been elected as a member of parliament for the constituency Reykjavík North, winning one of the nine available Leveling seats. At the age of 21, she would have been the youngest parliamentarian in the history of Alþingi, 22-days younger than Jóhanna María Sigmundsdóttir. However, after a recount in the Northwest constituency on 26 September, five leveling seats where reshuffled, meaning Lenya Rún and four other candidates lost their seats.

On 27 December 2021, she took a seat at Alþingi as a deputy member of parliament, temporarily replacing Andrés Ingi Jónsson.
