= Ásthildur Lóa Þórsdóttir =

Icelandic politician (born 1966)

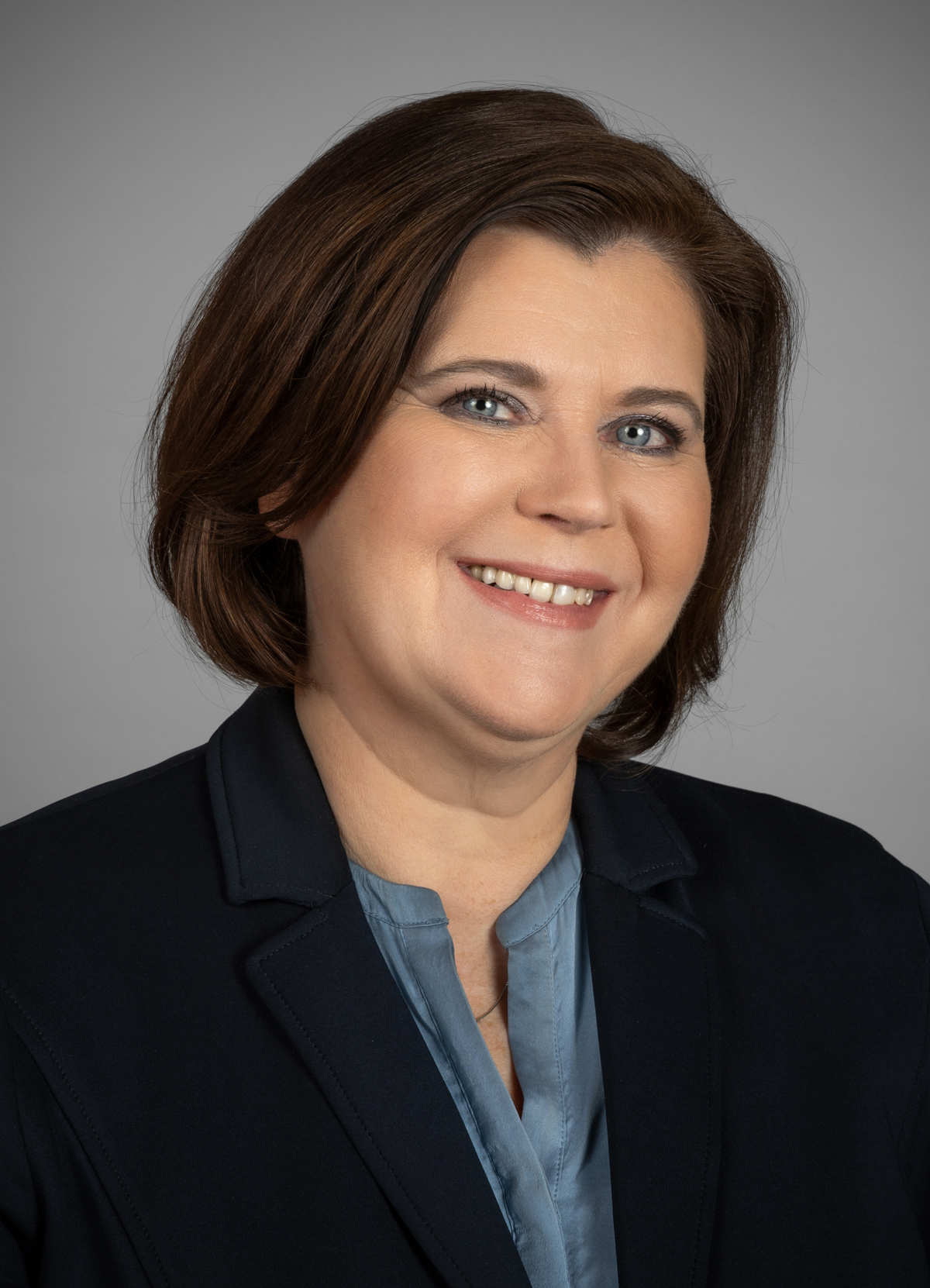
- Official portrait, 2025

Minister of Education and Children's Affairs
- In office 21 December 2024 – 20 March 2025
- Prime Minister: Kristrún Frostadóttir
- Preceded by: Ásmundur Einar Daðason
- Succeeded by: Guðmundur Ingi Kristinsson

Member of the Althing
- Incumbent
- Assumed office 25 September 2021
- Constituency: South

Acting Speaker of the Althing
- In office 30 November 2024 – 5 February 2025
- Preceded by: Birgir Ármannsson
- Succeeded by: Þórunn Sveinbjarnardóttir

Personal details
- Born: 20 November 1966 (age 59) Reykjavík, Iceland
- Party: People's
- Spouse: Hafþór Ólafsson
- Children: 2
- Education: University of Iceland; Iceland College of Education

Ásthildur Lóa Þórsdóttir (born 20 November 1966) is an Icelandic politician. She served as minister of education and children's affairs for four months until she resigned due to a scandal involving a sexual relationship with a 15-year-old boy when she was in her early 20s. She has been a member of the Althing since 2021 for the People's Party of Iceland.

== Education ==
Ásthildur graduated from Reykjavik Women's Gymnasium in 1986 and from the Iceland College of Education in 1994 with a B.Ed.

Diploma in Project Management and Leadership Training from Nordica Consulting Group at the Continuing Education Department of the University of Iceland 2016 and D-level IPMA certification in project management from the Icelandic Project Management Association (Verkefnastjórnunarfélagi Íslands).

== Previous career ==
She had worked as a teacher since 1994 throughout most of her career before becoming a minister.

== Resignation ==
On 20 March 2025, she resigned following a scandal in which she admitted to a sexual relationship with a 15-year-old boy when she was 22. They met in a religious group called Trú og Líf (English: Faith and Life), where she worked as a Christian youth leader.

She later gave birth to his child when he was 16, and she was 23.

At the time of the relationship, the age of consent in Iceland was 14. However, under current law, sexual relationships are not permitted between a person under the age of 18 and someone who is their teacher, mentor, or employer.
