= Logi Már Einarsson =

Icelandic politician and architect

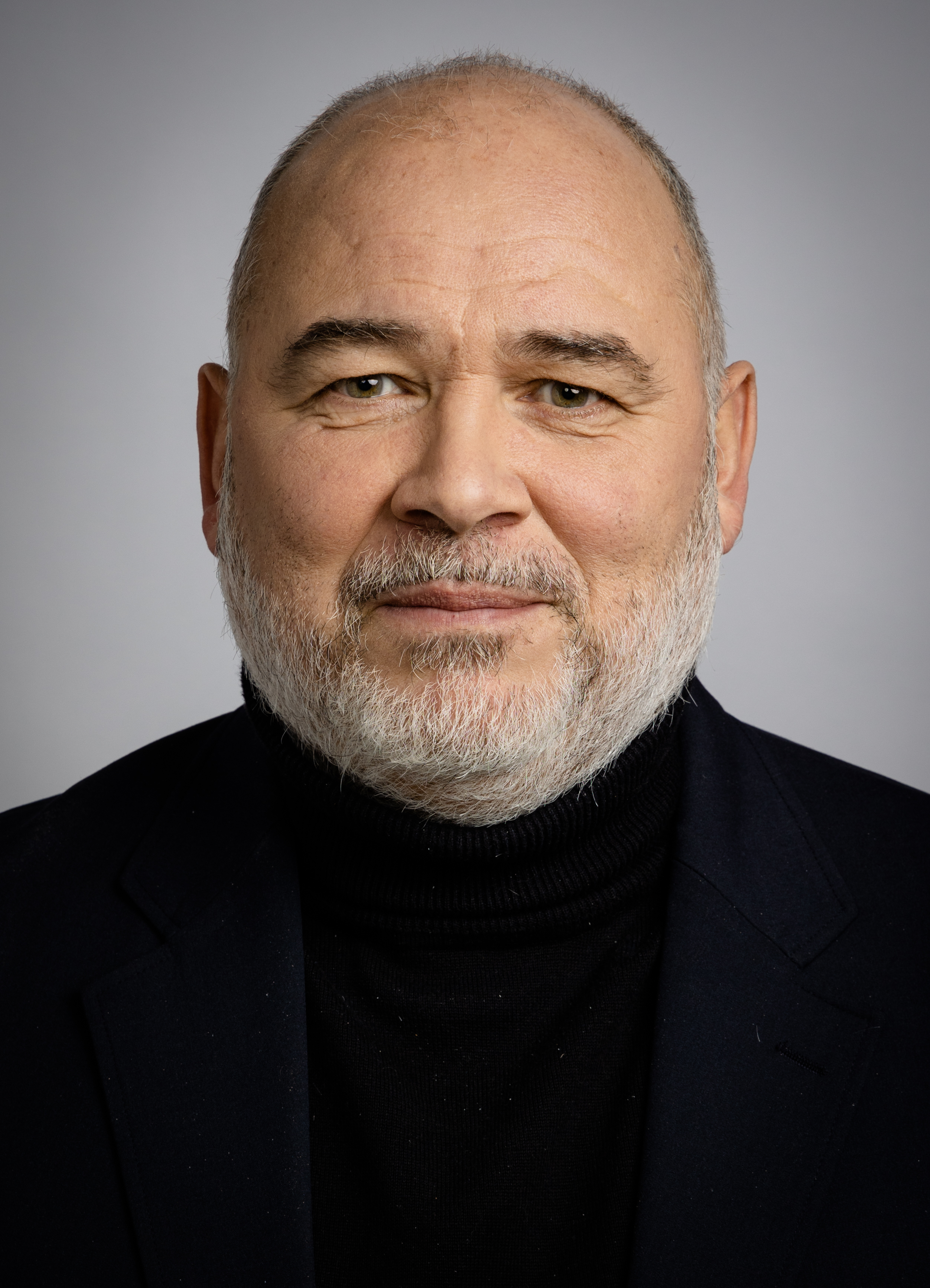
- Official portrait, 2021

Minister of Culture, Innovation and Universities
- Incumbent
- Assumed office 21 December 2024
- Prime Minister: Kristrún Frostadóttir
- Preceded by: Lilja Dögg Alfreðsdóttir (Culture and Business Affairs); Áslaug Arna Sigurbjörnsdóttir (Higher Education, Science and Innovation)

Leader of the Social Democratic Alliance
- In office 31 October 2016 – 28 October 2022
- Preceded by: Oddný Harðardóttir
- Succeeded by: Kristrún Frostadóttir

Member of the Althing
- Incumbent
- Assumed office 31 October 2016
- Constituency: Northeast

Member of the Akureyri City Council
- In office 29 May 2010 – 31 October 2016

Personal details
- Born: 21 August 1964 (age 61) Akureyri, Iceland
- Party: Social Democratic Alliance
- Spouse: Arnbjörg Sigurðardóttir
- Children: 2
- Education: Akureyri Junior College
- Alma mater: Oslo School of Architecture and Design
- Occupation: Architect; Politician

Logi Már Einarsson (born 21 August 1964) is an Icelandic politician and architect.

== Early life and education ==
Logi grew up in Akureyri and took stúdentspróf from Menntaskólinn á Akureyri in 1985. He studied architecture at the Oslo School of Architecture and Design 1986– 92 and graduated as a civil architect (Master of Architecture).

== Professional life ==
Following graduation Logi returned to Akureyri, where he worked as a landscape designer at H.J. teiknistofa 1992–94 and for the technical and zoning office at Akureyri municipality 1994–96, before switching back to the private sector where he worked for Form 1996-1997, Úti og Inni 1997–2003 and Arkitektúr.is 2003–2004. In late 2003 he founded the architecture and design firm Kollgáta together with industrial designer Ingólfur Freyr Guðmundsson. From 2010–12 he also lectured at Reykjavik University. Logi has been chairman of the Icelandic architectural association, Arkitektafélag Íslands.

== Political career ==
Logi first ran for parliament in the Northeast Constituency in the 2009 Althing election for the Social Democratic Alliance (SDA), and served as a substitute MP on five occasions during the 2009-2013 term. He became a member of the City Council in Akureyri in 2010, and was elected as deputy chairman of the SDA on their party conference in 2016. Logi contested the Northeast Constituency for his party in the 2016 Althing election and won the party's sole constituency seat. SDA suffered the worst defeat in the history of the party in the election, and as a consequence party chairman Oddný G. Harðardóttir stepped down and Logi was selected as Party Leader by the board on 31 October 2016. He left the City Council in Akureyri shortly after being elected to the Althing. He is a vice-chairman of the Icelandic Parliament Foreign Committee and member of the Future Committee. Logi was re-elected as Party Leader at the SDA Party Congress in March 2018. He announced in June 2022 that he would step down as leader at the party congress in October and was succeeded by Kristrún Frostadóttir.

Following his party's victory in the 2024 snap election, Logi was appointed minister of culture, innovation and universities in Kristrún Frostadóttir's cabinet.

== Personal life ==
Logi is married to the lawyer and flute player, Arnbjörg Sigurðardóttir. They have two children, Úlfur and Hrefna.
