= 2021 Icelandic parliamentary election =

- 25 September 2021
- All 63 seats in the Althing; 32 seats needed for a majority
- Turnout: 80.09%
Party	Leader	Vote %	Seats	+/–
Independence	Bjarni Benediktsson	24.39	16	0
Progressive	Sigurður Ingi Jóhannsson	17.27	13	+5
Left-Green	Katrín Jakobsdóttir	12.57	8	−3
Social Democratic	Logi Már Einarsson	9.93	6	−1
People's	Inga Sæland	8.85	6	+2
Pirates	Collective leadership (Note: The Pirate Party rejects the regular leadership model. A new formal chair is chosen at the start of each parliamentary session by coin toss. Their formal chairperson for the 2021–2022 period was Halldóra Mogensen.)	8.63	6	0
Viðreisn	Þorgerður Katrín Gunnarsdóttir	8.33	5	+1
Centre	Sigmundur Davíð Gunnlaugsson	5.45	3	−4
This lists parties that won seats. See the complete results below.
Results by constituency
Prime Minister before	Prime Minister after
Katrín Jakobsdóttir; Left-Green	Katrín Jakobsdóttir; Left-Green

Parliamentary elections were held in Iceland on 25 September 2021 to elect the members of the Althing. Following the elections, the three parties in the ruling coalition government – the Independence Party, Progressive Party and Left-Green Movement – agreed to continue in office, with Katrín Jakobsdóttir of the Left-Green Movement remaining Prime Minister despite her party being the smallest of the three. It was the first time an incumbent government had retained power in an election since the 2008 financial crisis.

== Background ==
=== 2017 parliamentary election ===
The 2017 parliamentary election was called after the collapse of the coalition government between the Independence Party, Viðreisn, and Bright Future after the withdrawal of the latter over a breach of trust involving a request to grant a convicted child sex offender "restored honor" from the father of Prime Minister Bjarni Benediktsson. In the 2017 election, the Independence Party lost 5 seats and was reduced to 16, while Viðreisn lost 3 to win 4, and Bright Future was eliminated from the Althing entirely. The Left-Green Movement gained 1 seat to win 11, the Social Democratic Alliance gained 4 seats to win 7, the Progressive Party remained steady with 8 seats, and the Pirate Party lost 4 seats and was reduced to 6 in total. Two parties entered the Althing for the first time, with the People's Party securing 4 seats and the Centre Party winning 7 seats.

With 16 seats and 25% of the vote, the Independence Party saw its second-worst electoral performance in its history in terms of vote percentage, the worst being the 2009 election, and tied its record low number of seats. A total of 24 women were elected to the Althing, compared to 30 in the 2016 election. Of those elected to the Althing, 19 were new, but this was considerably lower than in 2016 with 32.

=== Government formation ===
On 30 October 2017 President Guðni Th. Jóhannesson met with the leaders of the eight parliamentary parties. The four former opposition parties held informal talks, with the Progressive Party in pole position to determine whether the Independence Party or the Left-Greens would lead the next government. After meeting with Jóhannesson, Left-Green leader Katrín Jakobsdóttir declared that she wanted to form a government with the four former opposition parties, noting that though a coalition with additional parties would provide more than 32 seats, it was out of consideration before a four-party coalition was first attempted. On 2 November, Guðni Th. Jóhannesson granted Katrín Jakobsdóttir, leader of the Left-Green Movement, the mandate to form a coalition between her party, the Progressives, Social Democratic Alliance, and Pirates, the four having agreed to begin formal coalition talks.

On 6 November, after the Progressives announced that they would not continue talks over difficult issues with such a thin majority, Katrín Jakobsdóttir announced that she would return her mandate. In the following days, the leaders of the Left-Greens, Independence Party, and Progressive Party discussed the possibility of forming a coalition together, with the Left-Greens insistent that Katrín become prime minister in that case, an idea supported by the Progressives; in exchange, demissionary prime minister Bjarni Benediktsson would be appointed finance minister. Talks between the three parties were completed swiftly, and after meeting with Katrín on 28 November, president Guðni formally granted her the mandate to lead a government with the Independence Party and Progressive Party, pending the support of each of the parties, with the new government seated on 30 November. According to Article 22 of the constitution, the president must convene the newly elected Althing within 10 weeks of the election.

== Electoral system ==
The 63 members of the Althing were elected by open list proportional representation in six multi-member constituencies, with 54 seats distributed between parties at the constituency level with no electoral threshold and 9 leveling seats assigned to party lists at the national level with a threshold of 5 percent required in order to ensure proportionality with the election result. The 54 constituency seats were distributed within each constituency according to the D'Hondt method. Election lists were determined by parties. Voters had the option of marking preferential votes for particular candidates of the party they vote for, which can result in the order of the candidates being altered.

In the 2017 election, the Social Democratic Alliance received 7 seats – fewer than the Progressive Party, which came third in number of seats – despite the fact that it came third in the overall vote, with the Centre Party similarly receiving more votes but securing fewer seats than the Progressive Party. In the aftermath of the election, two professors at the University of Akureyri suggested that there was no need for a national constituency to allocate equalization seats, and that 15 leveling seats would be necessary to ensure proportionality in the future. In addition, the imbalance in number of votes between constituencies nearly violated the level stipulated in the constitution, with 2,690 eligible voters per seat in the Northwest constituency compared to 5,346 in the Southwest constituency, a ratio of 199%, just short of the constitutional limit of 200%.

=== Date ===
Per Article 20 in Chapter V of Act No. 24 from the 16 May 2000 Law Concerning Parliamentary Elections to the Althing, last amended in 2017, elections must be held no later than the same weekday of the month four years after the previous elections, counting from the turn of the month; because the 2017 parliamentary took place on the fourth Saturday in October, the latest possible date for the next election would be 23 October 2021.

Members of the opposition parties had called for the election to be scheduled for the spring of 2021, arguing that Icelandic elections are traditionally held during the spring — a tradition broken only by the premature elections in autumn of 2016 and 2017 – and that autumn elections give a newly-formed government too little time to prepare next year's budget. Finance Minister Bjarni Benediktsson dismissed those arguments, saying that gaining power had involved "blood, sweat and tears", and he had no interest in giving it away half a year earlier than required. On 24 July 2020, Prime Minister Katrín Jakobsdóttir announced that the it would take place on 25 September 2021, a month earlier than required, calling the decision "a compromise".

=== Political parties ===
The table below lists political parties represented in the Althing after the 2017 parliamentary election and parties which were on the ballot in at least one constituency in 2021.

Name		Ideology	Position	Leader	2017 result		Before election
Name		Ideology	Position	Leader	Votes (%)	Seats	
D	Independence Party; Sjálfstæðisflokkurinn	Liberal conservatism	Centre-right to right-wing	Bjarni Benediktsson	25.2%	16 / 63	16 / 63
V	Left-Green Movement; Vinstrihreyfingin – grænt framboð	Eco-socialism	Centre-left to left-wing	Katrín Jakobsdóttir	16.9%	11 / 63	9 / 63
B	Progressive Party; Framsóknarflokkurinn	Nordic agrarianism	Centre to centre-right	Sigurður Ingi Jóhannsson	10.7%	8 / 63	8 / 63
S	Social Democratic Alliance; Samfylkingin	Social democracy	Centre-left	Logi Már Einarsson	12.1%	7 / 63	8 / 63
M	Centre Party; Miðflokkurinn	Populism	Centre-right	Sigmundur Davíð Gunnlaugsson	10.9%	7 / 63	9 / 63
P	Pirate Party; Píratar	Pirate politics	Syncretic	None	9.2%	6 / 63	7 / 63
F	People's Party; Flokkur fólksins	Disability rights	Centre-left to right-wing	Inga Sæland	6.9%	4 / 63	2 / 63
C	Viðreisn	Liberalism	Centre-right	Þorgerður Katrín Gunnarsdóttir	6.7%	4 / 63	4 / 63
J	Socialist Party of Iceland; Sósíalistaflokkur Íslands	Socialism	Left-wing	Gunnar Smári	New	0 / 63	0 / 63
O	Liberal Democratic Party; Frjálslyndi lýðræðisflokkurinn	Classical liberalism	Right-wing	Guðmundur Franklín Jónsson	New	0 / 63	0 / 63
Y	Responsible Future; Ábyrg framtíð	Right-libertarianism	Right-wing	Jóhannes Loftsson	New	0 / 63	0 / 63

== Opinion polls ==
=== Graphical summary ===
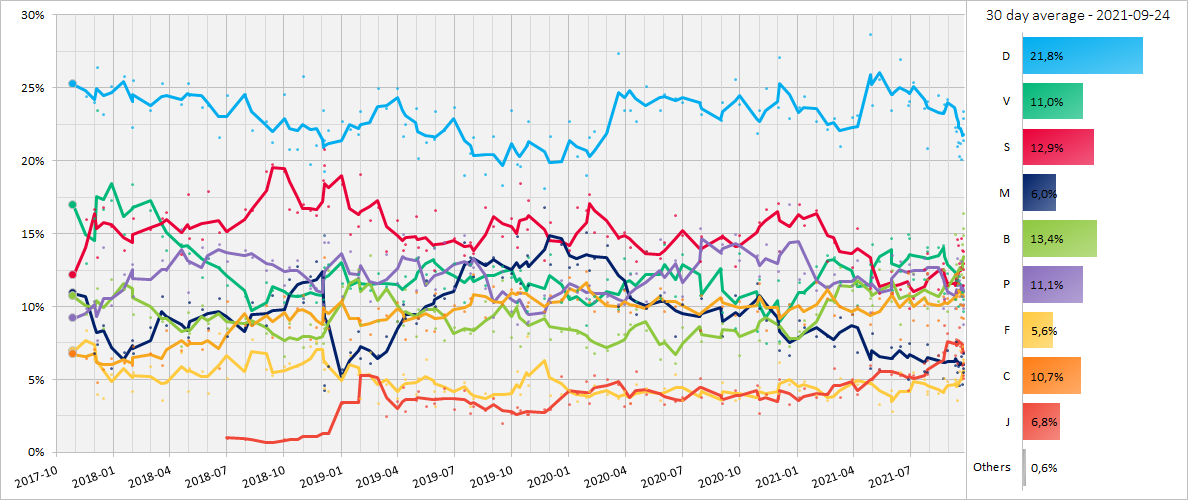

D = Independence Party, V = Left-Green Movement, S = Social Democratic Alliance, M = Centre Party, B = Progressive Party, P = Pirate Party, F = People's Party, C = Viðreisn, J = Socialist Party.

== Results ==
Compared to polling, the Progressive Party and the People's Party performed better than expectations, while the Social Democratic Alliance, Viðreisn, the Pirate Party, and the new Icelandic Socialist Party performed slightly worse. The Centre Party saw its vote percentage and seat count reduced by half compared to the prior elections, while the Progressive Party saw a vote percentage increase of over 6% and a seat increase of 5. The governing grand coalition of the Independence Party, the Left-Green Movement, and the Progressive Party were expected to negotiate to continue their cooperation.

On 9 October, Birgir Þórarinsson, who was originally elected to represent the Centre Party, announced that he was defecting to the Independence Party, making him the 17th member of the Althing for the Independence Party and leaving the Centre Party with just two members.

Party	Votes	%	Seats	+/–
Independence Party	48,708	24.39	16	0
Progressive Party	34,501	17.27	13	+5
Left-Green Movement	25,114	12.57	8	–3
Social Democratic Alliance	19,825	9.93	6	–1
People's Party	17,672	8.85	6	+2
Pirate Party	17,233	8.63	6	0
Viðreisn	16,628	8.33	5	+1
Centre Party	10,879	5.45	3	–4
Socialist Party of Iceland	8,181	4.10	0	New
Liberal Democratic Party	845	0.42	0	New
Responsible Future	144	0.07	0	New
Total	199,730	100.00	63	0
Valid votes	199,730	97.92		
Invalid/blank votes	4,249	2.08		
Total votes	203,979	100.00		
Registered voters/turnout	254,681	80.09		
Source: Statistics Iceland

=== By constituency ===
Constituency	D	B	V	S	F	P	C	M
Reykjavík North	20.9	12.3	15.9	12.6	7.7	12.8	7.7	3.5
Reykjavík South	22.8	11.5	14.7	13.3	8.9	10.9	8.6	4.1
Southwest	30.2	14.5	12.1	8.1	7.6	8.3	11.4	4.5
Northwest	22.5	25.8	11.5	6.9	8.8	6.3	6.2	7.4
Northeast	18.5	25.6	12.9	10.5	8.6	5.3	5.4	8.9
South	24.6	23.9	7.4	7.6	12.9	5.6	6.2	7.4

Constituency	D	B	V	S	F	P	C	M	Total
Reykjavík North	2	1	2	2	1	2	1	0	11
Reykjavík South	3	1	2	1	1	2	1	0	11
Southwest	4	2	1	1	1	2	2	0	13
Northwest	2	3	1	0	1	0	0	1	8
Northeast	2	3	2	1	1	0	0	1	10
South	3	3	0	1	1	0	1	1	10

=== Recounts ===
It was initially reported that 33 women and 30 men were elected, making Iceland the first European nation to have a female-majority parliament. Among them was Lenya Rún Taha Karim of the Pirate Party, who at 21 would become the youngest MP in Iceland's history. Following a recount in the Northwest Constituency, the representation became a majority of men. The Left-Green Movement and the Pirate Party both requested recounts in the South Constituency.

== Government formation ==
On 21 October, the Left-Green Movement, the Independence Party, and the Progressive Party were negotiating a continued coalition with Katrín remaining Prime Minister. The coalition talks focused on energy and climate issues. On 28 November, the three parties agreed on a renewed coalition.
