= Karl Gauti Hjaltason =

Icelandic politician

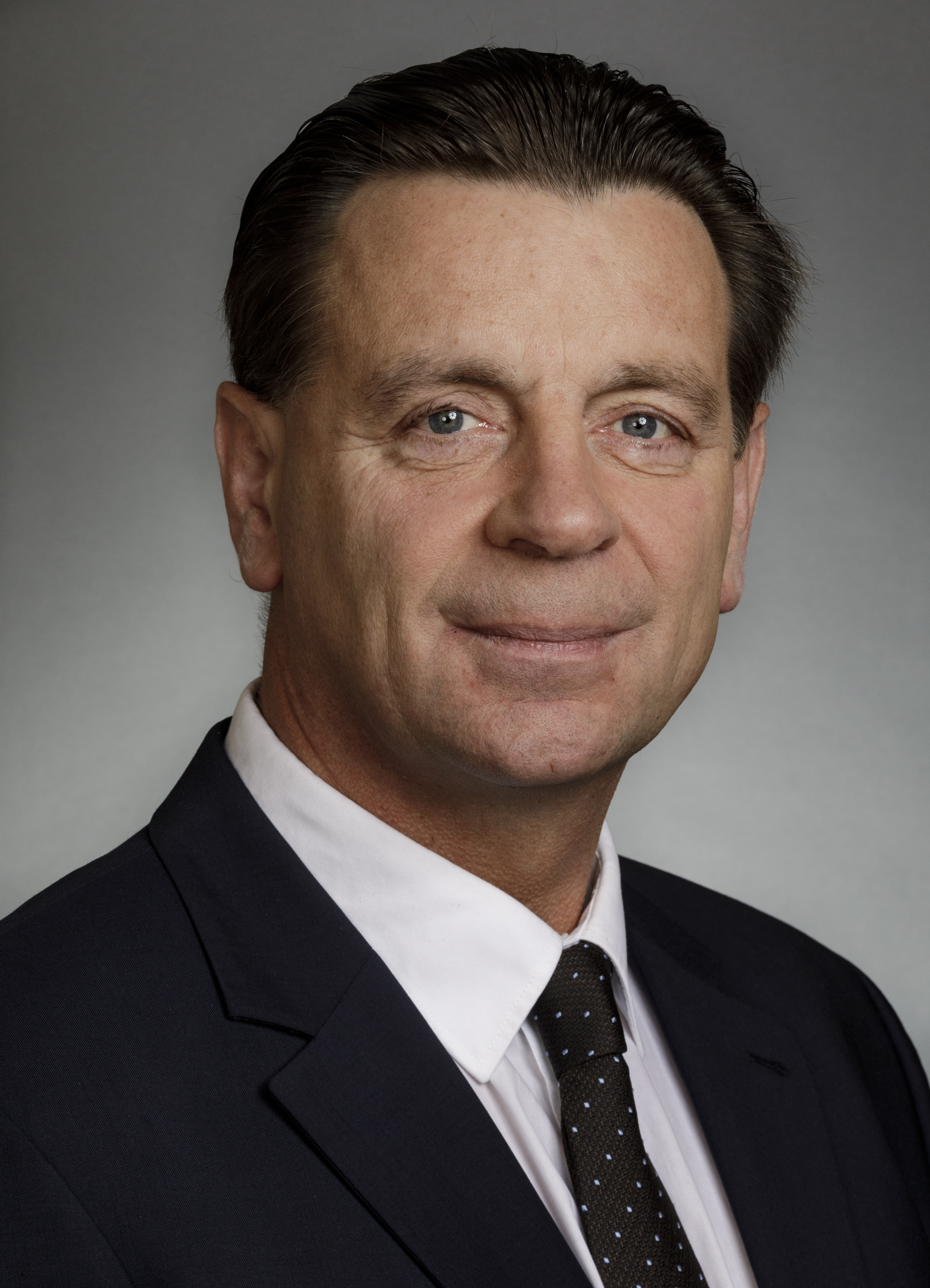
Karl Gauti Hjaltason, 2017

Karl Gauti Hjaltason (born 1959) is an Icelandic politician and former police officer. He was a member of Althing from 2017 to 2021 and has been serving as MP since 2024. Formerly, he was a part of People's Party of Iceland until he was expelled as part of the Klaustur Affair. Outside of his political career, Karl has served as the police chief in Vestmannaeyjar and Reykjavík and Sýslumaður in Vestmannaeyjar and Hólmavík. From 2014 to 2016, he was the head of the State Police Academy.

== Life and career ==
Karl Gauti was born in 1959 in Reykjavík, Iceland. He earned a degree in management from Endurmenntun Háskóla Íslands.

Between 1985 and 1998, Karl Gauti was the chairman of the Icelandic Karate Association. He has the black belt in karate.

In 2012, he founded Vestmannaeyjar Astronomical Society where he served as a chairman until 2014.
