= Social Democratic Alliance =

Political party in Iceland

Social Democratic Alliance Samfylkingin – jafnaðarflokkur Íslands
- Chairperson: Kristrún Frostadóttir
- Vice-chairperson: Guðmundur Árni Stefánsson
- Chairperson of the executive board: Guðmundur Ari Sigurjónsson
- Secretary: Arna Lára Jónsdóttir
- Chairperson of the parliamentary group: Logi Már Einarsson
- Founded: 5 May 2000
- Merger of: National Awakening; People's Alliance; Social Democratic Party; Women's List
- Headquarters: Hallveigarstigur 1, 101 Reykjavík
- Youth wing: Social Democratic Youth
- Ideology: Social democracy Pro-Europeanism
- Political position: Centre-left
- European affiliation: Party of European Socialists (associate)
- Nordic affiliation: SAMAK; The Social Democratic Group
- Colours: Red
- Seats in Parliament: 15 / 63

Election symbol

Website
- samfylkingin.is

The Social Democratic Alliance (Icelandic: Samfylkingin - jafnaðarflokkur Íslands, lit. 'The Alliance – Iceland's Equality Party') (Note: Jafnaðarflokkur can also mean "Social Democratic Party", a similar translation is used by the Faroese Social Democratic Party.) is a social democratic political party in Iceland. The party is positioned on the centre-left of the political spectrum and their leader is Kristrún Frostadóttir, who has been leader since 2022, and has served as Prime Minister of Iceland since 21 December 2024.

Founded in 2000 as a merger of four centre-left parties, the party formed its first government following the 2009 Icelandic parliamentary election under Jóhanna Sigurðardóttir. The party was defeated in 2013, and remained in opposition until winning the 2024 elections. The youth wing of the Social Democratic Alliance is the Social Democratic Youth.

== History ==
In 1999, four centre-left political parties (the National Awakening, the People's Alliance, the Social Democratic Party and the Women's List) agreed to form a joint run by all parties in the 1999 Icelandic parliamentary election. The vision of the party was to unite the left-wing of Icelandic politics, which had been fractured since the 1930 split of the Social Democratic Party, and present a united bloc to oppose the ruling Independence Party. The leader of the alliance at the 1999 election was Margrét Frímannsdóttir. The alliance elected 17 MPs and finished second in terms of total votes, but still finished some way behind the dominant Independence Party.

The parties then formally merged in May 2000 under the name The Alliance (Samfylkingin). The first leader of the unified party was Össur Skarphéðinsson. The merger was a deliberate attempt to unify the entire Icelandic centre-left into one political party capable of countering the centre-right Independence Party. However, the initial attempt failed as a group of Althing representatives rejected the new party's platform, which was inspired by that of UK Prime Minister Tony Blair's centrist New Labour, and broke away before the merger to found the Left-Green Movement, a party based on more traditional democratic socialist values as well as Euroscepticism and green politics.

In the 2003 parliamentary election, the party improved on its 1999 showing, electing 20 MPs and finishing with just 3% less of the total vote share than the Independence Party. The party fell back some in the 2007 Icelandic parliamentary election under Ingibjörg Sólrún Gísladóttir, winning 18 seats, as the Left-Green Movement began eating into their left-leaning voter base. However, the Alliance did enter government for the first time after the 2007 election, forming a grand coalition in supporting the government of Independence Party Prime Minister Geir Haarde. The Alliance received the portfolios for the Ministries of Commerce, Foreign Affairs, Social Affairs, Communications, Industry, and the Environment.

The Icelandic Movement – Living Country merged into the party in March 2009. In the snap 2009 parliamentary election called in the aftermath of the Icelandic financial crisis, the Social Democratic Alliance under the leadership of Jóhanna Sigurðardóttir emerged as the largest party and formed a coalition government with the Left-Green Movement, which was the country's first majority left-wing government. She was the country’s first female prime minister and the world’s first openly gay head of government. In February 2013, the official name of the party was changed to The Alliance – Social Democratic Party of Iceland (Icelandic: Samfylkingin – Jafnaðarmannaflokkur Íslands).

The party lost substantial support in the 2013 parliamentary election, its first under new leader Árni Páll Árnason who replaced Jóhanna in February of that year. The party fell from first to third largest in Alþingi. It fell back further at the 2016 parliamentary election, under new leader Oddný G. Harðardóttir, where it polled 5.7% and elected only three MPs. Oddný resigned after the election, and was replaced by Logi Már Einarsson.

In 2014, it became the largest party in the Reykjavík City Council, and party member Dagur B. Eggertsson became mayor. Since 2018 it has been the second largest party in the City Council after the Independence Party, but the Alliance is part of the governing coalition of Progressive Party mayor Einar Þorsteinsson. In the 2017 parliamentary election, the party rebounded some by winning seven seats on 12.1% of the vote. However, the party lost one of their seats and received 9.9% of the vote in the 2021 parliamentary election. Logi led the party in both of these elections, becoming the first Alliance leader to contest two elections, but stepped down after the disappointing results in 2021, and was replaced by Kristrún Frostadóttir in 2022, who remains the current chair of the party.

In the 2024 parliamentary election under new leader Kristrún, the party won 15 seats on 20.8% of the vote, the largest party in both seats and vote share. President Halla Tómasdóttir gave the Social Democratic Alliance the first mandate to form a government, and Kristrún became Prime Minister in a government led by the Social Democratic Alliance and supported by Viðreisn and the People's Party. With Kristrún as Prime Minister and Halla as President, it was the first time in history Iceland had women in both offices simultaneously. The two junior coalition partners in Kristrún's government are also led by women.

== Election results ==
Election	Leader	Votes	%	Seats	+/–	Position	Government
1999	Margrét Frímannsdóttir	44,378	26.78	17 / 63	New	2nd	Opposition
2003	Össur Skarphéðinsson	56,700	30.95	20 / 63	▲3	2nd	Opposition
2007	Ingibjörg Sólrún Gísladóttir	48,743	26.76	18 / 63	▼2	2nd	Coalition
2009	Jóhanna Sigurðardóttir	55,758	29.79	20 / 63	▲2	▲1st	Coalition
2013	Árni Páll Árnason	24,292	12.85	9 / 63	▼11	▼3rd	Opposition
2016	Oddný G. Harðardóttir	10,893	5.74	3 / 63	▼6	▼7th	Opposition
2017	Logi Már Einarsson	23,652	12.05	7 / 63	▲4	▲4th	Opposition
2021	Logi Már Einarsson	19,825	9.93	6 / 63	▼1	4th	Opposition
2024	Kristrún Frostadóttir	44,091	20.75	15 / 63	▲9	▲1st	Coalition

== Leadership ==
Nº	Chairman	Tenure		Elections Contested
Nº	Chairman	Assumed office	Left office	Elections Contested
1	Margrét Frímannsdóttir (born 1954)	1999	2000	1999
2	Össur Skarphéðinsson (born 1953)	2000	2005	2003
3	Ingibjörg Sólrún Gísladóttir (born 1954)	2005	2009	2007
4	Jóhanna Sigurðardóttir (born 1942)	2009	26 February 2013	2009
5	Árni Páll Árnason (born 1966)	26 February 2013	3 June 2016	2013
6	Oddný Guðbjörg Harðardóttir (born 1957)	3 June 2016	31 October 2016	2016
7	Logi Már Einarsson (born 1964)	31 October 2016	28 October 2022	2017; 2021
8	Kristrún Frostadóttir (born 1988)	28 October 2022	Present	2024
