= 2024 Icelandic parliamentary election =

- 30 November 2024
- All 63 seats in the Althing; 32 seats needed for a majority
- Opinion polls
- Turnout: 80.18%
Party	Leader	Vote %	Seats	+/–
Social Democratic	Kristrún Frostadóttir	20.75	15	+9
Independence	Bjarni Benediktsson	19.36	14	−2
Viðreisn	Þorgerður Katrín Gunnarsdóttir	15.82	11	+6
People's	Inga Sæland	13.78	10	+4
Centre	Sigmundur Davíð Gunnlaugsson	12.10	8	+5
Progressive	Sigurður Ingi Jóhannsson	7.80	5	−8
This lists parties that won seats. See the complete results below.
Results by constituency
Prime Minister before	Prime Minister after election
Bjarni Benediktsson; Independence	Kristrún Frostadóttir; Social Democratic

Parliamentary elections were held in Iceland on 30 November 2024 to elect the 63 members of the Althing. The centre-left Social Democratic Alliance, led by Kristrún Frostadóttir, outperformed the ruling Independence Party to win the most seats, at 15. The election saw the worst performance by the Independence Party, Progressive Party, the Left-Green Movement, and the Pirate Party in each of the parties' histories, while Viðreisn, the People's Party, and the Centre Party saw their best performance in each of the parties' histories. This follows a trend of Icelanders voting against every post–2008 recession government except during the 2021 election.

The Left-Green Movement and the Pirate Party lost all of their parliamentary representation, with each failing to obtain a seat for the first time since their foundation in the 1999 and 2013 elections, respectively.

== Background ==
=== Previous election ===
The 2021 parliamentary election took place on 25 September, a month before the latest date allowed by law. The government coalition of the Left-Green Movement, the Progressive Party and the Independence Party, led by prime minister Katrín Jakobsdóttir, had been in place since the 2017 elections. This unusual coalition of parties from the left wing, the center and the right wing of Icelandic mainstream politics maintained its majority in parliament in the elections as the Independence Party had the same number of seats as before while the Progressive Party added 5 seats and the Left-Green Movement lost 3. As for the opposition parties, the People's Party gained two seats and Viðreisn gained 1 seat. The Pirate Party held steady but the Social Democratic Alliance lost 1 seat and the Centre Party lost 4 of its seats in parliament. The Icelandic Socialist Party received 4.1% of the vote but no seats as 5% of the national vote is needed to be eligible for the allocation of leveling seats.

The coalition partners from the previous term soon decided that the first option for coalition talks should be to renew their coalition. The second cabinet of Katrín Jakobsdóttir was then formed on 28 November.

=== Fall of government ===
In April 2024, Katrín Jakobsdóttir resigned to contest the 2024 Icelandic presidential election, which she lost. She was succeeded as prime minister by Bjarni Benediktsson.

On 13 October, prime minister Bjarni Benediktsson announced that the government had collapsed due to disputes over foreign policy, asylum seekers, and energy, prompting him to call for new elections and ask President Halla Tómasdóttir the next day to dissolve the Althingi and set the elections for 30 November. In particular, Bjarni cited "how different the Movement's vision for the future is, compared to what I want to stand for".

== Issues ==
In November 2024, a Gallup poll found that more than 60% of voters regarded healthcare, economic issues and housing as a top concern. Immigration was regarded as a key issue by 32% of those surveyed while asylum issues accounted for 18% of respondents. The public broadcaster RÚV said that an AI chatbot set up to answer election-related questions received mostly queries on housing and taxation.

== Electoral system ==
The 63 members of the Althing are elected by open list proportional representation in six multi-member constituencies, with 54 seats allocated to parties at the constituency level with no electoral threshold, and 9 leveling seats assigned to party lists at the national level in order to ensure proportionality with the election result, with a threshold of 5 percent required. The 54 constituency seats are distributed within each constituency according to the D'Hondt method. Election lists are determined by parties; although voters have the option of altering the order of candidates or striking out particular candidates entirely, this rarely has any effect on the result.

The number of voters per parliamentary seat varies significantly between the constituencies of Iceland. The number of seats per constituency was determined by law in 1999 and is not updated before each election except when the number of voters per representative in the most represented constituency reaches half the number of voters per representative in the least represented constituency. The constitution stipulates that in this case, a constituency seat should be transferred from the most represented constituency to the least represented constituency. This has happened twice since 1999, in both cases transferring a constituency seat from the Northwest constituency (a large rural constituency) to the Southwest constituency (a relatively small constituency in area, adjoining the capital city). In the 2021 election, the number of eligible voters for each seat in the Southwest was 5671.5, more than double the 2693.5 eligible voters for each seat in the Northwest. According to the constitution, this means another transfer of a constituency seat from the Northwest to the Southwest before this election.

=== Date ===
Per Article 23 in Chapter V of Act No. 112 from the 25 June 2021 Elections Law, elections must be held no later than the same weekday of the month four years after the previous elections, counting from the turn of the month; therefore, because the 2021 election took place on the fourth Saturday in September, the latest possible date for the election was 27 September 2025.

Following the collapse of the government in October 2024, the election was held on 30 November.

== Political parties ==
The table below lists political parties participating in the election. This list also includes the percentages and Althing seats of the parties after the 2021 parliamentary election.

Name		Ideology	Position	Leader	2021 result	
Name		Ideology	Position	Leader	Votes (%)	Seats
D	Independence Party; Sjálfstæðisflokkurinn	Conservatism; Economic liberalism	Centre-right	Bjarni Benediktsson	24.4%	16 / 63
B	Progressive Party; Framsóknarflokkurinn	Nordic agrarianism Liberalism	Centre to centre-right	Sigurður Ingi Jóhannsson	17.3%	13 / 63
V	Left-Green Movement; Vinstrihreyfingin – grænt framboð	Democratic socialism Eco-socialism	Centre-left to left-wing	Svandís Svavarsdóttir	12.6%	8 / 63
S	Social Democratic Alliance; Samfylkingin – jafnaðarflokkur Íslands	Social democracy Pro-Europeanism	Centre-left	Kristrún Frostadóttir	9.9%	6 / 63
F	People's Party; Flokkur fólksins	Populism; Disability rights	Centre to centre-left	Inga Sæland	8.8%	6 / 63
P	Pirate Party; Píratar	Pirate politics	—N/a		8.6%	6 / 63
C	Viðreisn; Liberal Reform Party	Liberalism; Green liberalism	Centre to centre-right	Þorgerður Katrín Gunnarsdóttir	8.3%	5 / 63
M	Centre Party; Miðflokkurinn	Conservatism; Right-wing populism Nordic agrarianism	Right-wing	Sigmundur Davíð Gunnlaugsson	5.4%	3 / 63
J	Icelandic Socialist Party; Sósíalistaflokkur Íslands	Socialism; Democratic socialism	Left-wing	Sanna Magdalena Mörtudóttir	4.1%	0 / 63
Y	Responsible Future; Ábyrg framtíð	Right-libertarianism; Anti-vaccination	Right-wing	Jóhannes Loftsson	0.1%	0 / 63
L	Democratic Party; Lýðræðisflokkurinn	Libertarian conservatism Right-libertarianism	Right-wing	Arnar Þór Jónsson	Did not exist	

== Opinion polls ==
D B V S F P C M J L Y

Polling firm	Fieldwork date	Sample size	Resp.	Parties												
Polling firm	Fieldwork date	Sample size	Resp.	Government			Opposition								Oth.	Lead
Polling firm	Fieldwork date	Sample size	Resp.	D	B	V	S	F	P	C	M	J	L	Y	Oth.	Lead
2024 parliamentary election	30 Nov 2024	–	–	19.36	7.80	2.34	20.75	13.78	3.02	15.82	12.10	3.96	1.04	0.02	–	1.39
Gallup	23–29 Nov 2024	4,285	53.7	18.4	6.8	3.1	20.0	12.6	4.1	17.6	11.2	4.8	1.4	0.0	–	1.6
Prósent	25–28 Nov 2024	4,500	52.9	14.7	6.4	3.4	21.8	11.2	5.5	17.6	12.0	5.8	1.2	–	–	4.2
Maskína	22–28 Nov 2024	–	2,617	14.5	7.8	3.7	20.4	10.8	5.4	19.2	11.6	5.0	1.1	0.5	–	1.2
Gallup	15–21 Nov 2024	–	–	16.0	6.2	3.3	20.2	13.1	4.1	18.1	12.2	5.1	–	–	–	2.1
Prósent	15–21 Nov 2024	–	–	11.5	4.4	3.0	18.3	12.5	6.7	22.0	13.5	6.4	1.0	0.7	–	3.7
Maskína	15–20 Nov 2024	1,400	–	14.6	5.9	3.1	22.7	8.8	4.3	20.9	12.6	5.0	1.6	0.6	–	1.8
Prósent	8–14 Nov 2024	2,600	52.0	12.0	5.6	2.4	22.4	10.2	3.4	21.5	15.5	5.4	1.0	0.6	–	0.9
Gallup	1–14 Nov 2024	1,463	48.0	16.4	6.0	4.1	20.8	10.2	5.5	15.5	14.3	6.2	1.0	0.1	–	4.4
Maskína	8–13 Nov 2024	1,406	–	13.4	7.3	3.4	20.1	9.2	5.1	19.9	12.6	6.3	2.1	0.6	–	0.2
Prósent	1-7 Nov 2024	2,400	50.0	12.3	5.8	2.6	21.6	11.5	5.7	17.1	15.1	6.7	1.4	0.2	–	4.5
Maskína	1-6 Nov 2024	1,406	–	13.3	7.5	3.2	20.9	8.9	4.8	19.4	14.9	4.5	1.7	0.8		1.5
Gallup	1-31 Oct 2024	12,125	47.5	17.3	6.5	4.1	23.8	7.8	5.4	13.5	16.5	4.5	0.6	0.0	–	6.5
Prósent	25–31 Oct 2024	2,400	–	14.1	5.8	2.6	22.3	11.2	4.9	18.5	14.4	4.0	1.5	0.4	0.5	3.8
Maskína	22-28 Oct 2024	1,708	–	13.9	6.9	3.8	22.2	9.3	4.5	16.2	15.9	4.0	1.6	0.9	0.8 (Note: The Greens)	6.0
Prósent	18-24 Oct 2024	2,500	50.0	13.3	5.8	2.4	24.2	11.4	5.8	15.0	16.1	4.3	1.1	0.4	–	8.1
Prósent	18 Oct 2024	–	–	15.6	6.2	2.2	24.8	10.8	6.1	14.1	15.1	4.2	–	N/A	–	9.2
Maskína	13–18 Oct 2024	–	–	14.1	8	5.1	21.9	7.3	5.2	13.4	17.7	5.2	2.1	N/A	–	4.2
Prósent	18 Sep–3 Oct 2024	2,150	50.8	12	5	3	26	11	9	11	18	4	Did not exist	N/A	–	8
Gallup	30 Aug–30 Sep 2024	11,138	48.3	14.1	6.2	4.3	26.2	7.5	7.6	10.3	18.7	5.2	Did not exist	N/A	–	7.5
Maskína	24 Sep 2024	1,783	–	13.4	7.6	3.7	25.0	8.8	8.5	11.3	17.0	4.7	Did not exist	N/A	–	8.0
Gallup	1–29 Aug 2024	10,780	46.8	17.1	7.0	3.4	26.4	6.7	7.8	10.1	16.0	5.7	Did not exist	N/A	–	9.3
Maskína	7–27 Aug 2024	1,730	–	13.9	9.0	4.6	25.5	7.1	8.6	10.7	15.3	5.2	Did not exist	N/A	–	10.2
Gallup	1–30 Jul 2024	9,306	45.9	17.2	7.2	3.5	27.6	8.6	7.8	8.8	14.6	4.7	Did not exist	N/A	–	10.4
Gallup	3–30 Jun 2024	8,786	47.3	18.5	6.6	4.0	26.9	7.7	8.8	9.4	14.5	3.5	Did not exist	N/A	–	8.4
Maskína	31 May–20 Jun 2024	1,846	–	14.7	10.2	5.0	27.1	5.0	9.3	10.1	12.7	5.9	Did not exist	N/A	–	12.4
Gallup	30 Apr–2 Jun 2024	12,731	50.2	18.0	9.1	3.3	29.9	6.1	8.8	7.7	13.5	3.7	Did not exist	N/A	–	11.9
Maskína	30 Apr–23 May 2024	3,349	–	17.5	10.4	5.1	27.3	5.6	8.4	9.3	12.6	3.9	Did not exist	N/A	–	9.8
Háskóli Íslands	22–30 Apr 2024	2,638	–	19.0	10.0	4.3	25.4	7.3	8.1	7.9	13.4	4.4	Did not exist	N/A	0.2 (Note: Liberal Democratic Party)	6.4
Gallup	3–28 Apr 2024	9,925	48.1	18.0	8.8	4.4	29.7	7.2	8.2	7.5	12.8	3.4	Did not exist	N/A	–	11.7
Maskína	5–16 Apr 2024	1,746	–	17.2	10.7	5.0	27.3	5.3	8.5	10.2	11.6	4.1	Did not exist	N/A	–	10.1
Gallup	1 Mar–2 Apr 2024	–	–	18.2	7.3	5.6	30.9	6.2	7.8	7.1	12.9	3.9	Did not exist	N/A	–	12.7
Maskína	6–12 Mar 2024	1,753	–	18.0	9.4	6.7	25.6	5.7	9.5	9.7	11.9	3.5	Did not exist	N/A	–	7.6
Gallup	1–29 Feb 2024	9,964	48.1	19.9	8.8	4.7	28.2	6.8	8.0	7.5	12.8	3.5	Did not exist	N/A	–	8.3
Maskína	7–27 Feb 2024	1,706	–	18.4	8.5	5.9	27.2	6.4	9.0	9.2	11.1	4.3	Did not exist	N/A	–	8.8
Gallup	2–31 Jan 2024	10,503	46.9	18.2	8.4	5.5	30.6	7.9	8.1	7.0	10.9	3.4	Did not exist	N/A	–	12.4
Maskína	10–15 Jan 2024	1,936	–	16.6	10.3	5.7	25.7	6.5	7.6	11.7	11.8	4.1	Did not exist	N/A	–	9.1
Gallup	1 Dec 2023 – 1 Jan 2024	9,636	48.9	18.1	9.4	6.0	28.4	6.8	9.1	8.8	9.7	3.6	Did not exist	N/A	–	10.3
Maskína	19–27 Dec 2023	1,945	–	17.3	9.9	5.6	26.3	6.8	8.1	12.2	9.4	4.3	Did not exist	N/A	–	9.0
Gallup	1–30 Nov 2023	9,721	47.8	19.8	8.6	5.1	28.1	6.9	9.3	7.9	9.4	4.2	Did not exist	N/A	–	8.3
Maskína	3–7 Nov & 23–26 Nov 2023	2,376	–	17.9	10.4	6.1	26.0	6.4	10.0	10.3	8.4	4.4	Did not exist	N/A	–	8.1
Gallup	2–31 Oct 2023	10,463	49.8	20.5	7.4	6.0	29.1	6.5	10.2	7.5	8.6	4.1	Did not exist	N/A	–	8.6
Maskína	12–24 Oct 2023	1,935	–	17.7	9.8	5.9	27.8	6.1	10.8	9.3	8.2	4.3	Did not exist	N/A	–	10.1
Gallup	1 Sep–3 Oct 2023	11,005	48.5	20.4	8.1	5.7	30.1	5.7	9.6	7.9	8.6	3.9	Did not exist	N/A	–	9.7
Maskína	15–29 Sep 2023	1,466	–	19.6	8.8	6.5	24.4	6.5	10.8	11.6	7.0	4.8	Did not exist	N/A	–	4.8
Gallup	1–31 August 2023	10,076	49.5	21.1	7.5	5.9	28.5	6.3	10.3	7.2	8.7	4.4	Did not exist	N/A	–	7.4
Maskína	17–22 August 2023	954	–	17.6	9.2	6.4	26.1	5.9	13.1	9.5	7.9	4.2	Did not exist	N/A	–	8.5
Gallup	3–30 July 2023	10,491	46.1	21.0	8.9	6.1	28.6	5.7	10.5	7.0	8.5	3.6	Did not exist	N/A	–	7.6
Maskína	6–24 July 2023	836	–	19.3	9.6	8.0	25.3	6.0	11.0	10.4	5.9	4.5	Did not exist	N/A	–	6.0
Prósent	22 June–22 July 2023	2,300	51.8	16.1	7.1	7.3	27.4	8.5	14.5	8.9	7.2	2.9	Did not exist	N/A	–	11.3
Gallup	1 June–2 July 2023	11,331	48.8	20.8	8.7	6.2	28.4	5.7	9.7	8.1	7.8	4.6	Did not exist	N/A	–	7.6
Maskína	1–22 June 2023	1,691	–	18.5	8.8	7.0	27.2	6.6	11.3	9.7	6.3	4.7	Did not exist	N/A	–	8.7
Gallup	2–31 May 2023	10,316	48.2	20.8	10.2	5.7	28.4	5.5	10.1	7.6	6.9	4.9	Did not exist	N/A	–	7.6
Maskína	4–16 May 2023	1,726	–	19.2	10.0	6.1	27.3	5.6	11.0	9.1	6.4	5.2	Did not exist	N/A	–	8.1
Gallup	3 Apr–1 May 2023	9,916	48.7	21.9	9.6	6.6	27.8	6.0	10.0	7.4	6.2	4.3	Did not exist	N/A	–	5.9
Maskína	13–19 Apr 2023	852	–	18.7	10.2	8.2	25.7	4.4	11.4	10.6	6.0	4.9	Did not exist	N/A	–	7.0
Gallup	1 Mar–2 Apr 2023	1,128	–	22.3	9.9	7.1	25.1	5.6	9.4	9.1	6.3	5.1	Did not exist	N/A	–	2.8
Maskína	6–20 Mar 2023	1,599	–	20.2	13.2	6.0	24.4	5.2	10.2	9.1	5.7	6.0	Did not exist	N/A	–	4.2
Gallup	1–28 Feb 2023	9,517	49.6	22.5	10.8	6.8	24.0	5.6	12.1	7.7	5.3	5.0	Did not exist	N/A	–	1.5
Maskína	3–13 Feb 2023	1,892	–	20.1	12.3	6.7	23.3	5.9	12.7	8.2	5.8	5.0	Did not exist	N/A	–	2.2
Prósent	27 Jan–6 Feb 2023	2,400	51.4	23.2	11.8	5.9	22.1	9.5	12.5	6.9	4.1	4.1	Did not exist	N/A	–	1.1
Maskína	13–18 Jan 2023	804	–	21.8	12.1	8.3	23.6	5.1	10.4	9.1	5.9	3.6	Did not exist	N/A	–	1.8
Gallup	6–31 Jan 2023	9,842	48.5	23.5	11.3	6.8	25.3	5.5	10.4	7.3	5.5	4.4	Did not exist	N/A	–	1.8
Gallup	1 Dec 2022–2 Jan 2023	7,115	48.0	23.8	12.1	6.8	23.4	6.2	11.3	6.9	4.6	4.6	Did not exist	N/A	–	0.2
Prósent	22–30 Dec 2022	4,000	49.6	23.2	10.8	6.7	20.5	9.7	14.3	6.2	4.5	4.0	Did not exist	N/A	–	2.7
Maskína	16–28 Dec 2022	1,703	–	20.0	12.2	7.8	20.1	7.0	12.5	7.5	6.7	6.1	Did not exist	N/A	–	0.1
Gallup	1–30 Nov 2022	10,798	50.8	24.1	12.2	7.5	21.1	4.5	12.2	7.4	5.6	5.2	Did not exist	N/A	–	3.0
Maskína	4–22 Nov 2022	2,483	–	21.8	14.8	7.1	19.0	5.0	13.4	9.0	4.9	5.0	Did not exist	N/A	–	2.8
Prósent	14–17 Nov 2022	2,600	51.3	21.1	14.6	8.0	19.1	6.4	11.8	10.6	4.2	4.2	Did not exist	N/A	–	2.0
Gallup	3–31 Oct 2022	8,267	49.9	24.4	13.8	8.4	16.6	5.3	12.9	8.4	5.0	5.0	Did not exist	N/A	–	7.8
Maskína	30 Sep–17 Oct 2022	1,638	–	22.8	15.0	7.7	14.4	4.6	14.3	9.5	5.0	6.5	Did not exist	N/A	–	7.8
Gallup	1 Sep–2 Oct 2022	11,149	48.3	24.1	13.4	8.2	16.3	5.1	13.6	8.5	5.4	5.1	Did not exist	N/A	–	7.8
Maskína	16–27 Sep 2022	1,875	–	20.8	15.6	8.7	15.2	5.0	12.3	10.4	5.3	6.8	Did not exist	N/A	–	5.2
Gallup	2–31 Aug 2022	10,719	48.9	21.8	15.6	8.4	15.5	5.6	14.8	8.4	4.6	5.1	Did not exist	N/A	–	6.2
Maskína	12–17 Aug 2022	890	–	20.9	19.6	7.5	12.9	4.6	13.9	8.9	4.5	7.3	Did not exist	N/A	–	1.3
Gallup	1 Jul–1 Aug 2022	9,705	49.0	22.1	15.4	8.6	13.7	6.6	15.0	8.6	4.4	5.3	Did not exist	N/A	–	6.7
Maskína	20–25 Jul 2022	895	–	24.4	18.0	7.7	10.9	6.9	12.7	8.3	6.0	5.1	Did not exist	N/A	–	6.4
Gallup	2–30 Jun 2022	10,274	61.7	22.8	17.5	7.2	13.7	7.0	16.1	6.7	4.6	4.1	Did not exist	N/A	–	5.3
Maskína	1–23 Jun 2022	1,658	–	19.3	18.3	8.5	13.4	6.3	14.6	8.8	4.7	6.1	Did not exist	N/A	–	1.0
Prósent	2–13 Jun 2022	1,780	50.1	18.5	17.3	9.0	13.5	5.6	17.5	7.8	4.2	6.3	Did not exist	N/A	–	2.2
Gallup	2–31 May 2022	10,548	51.9	20.1	17.5	8.1	14.1	6.4	14.7	9.5	4.3	5.0	Did not exist	N/A	–	2.6
Prósent	13–26 Apr 2022	3,500	50.3	17.9	12.4	9.6	16.8	8.0	16.2	9.6	4.1	5.4	Did not exist	N/A	–	1.1
Gallup	1–30 Apr 2022	9,828	50.1	19.8	15.6	10.1	13.7	7.7	14.5	9.6	4.1	4.6	Did not exist	N/A	–	4.2
Maskína	17 Mar–12 Apr 2022	1,367	–	22.4	15.5	8.8	13.0	7.7	13.2	10.5	4.2	4.6	Did not exist	N/A	–	6.9
Gallup	1–31 Mar 2022	10,941	49.6	22.7	18.0	11.4	11.2	8.2	11.9	9.1	3.7	3.6	Did not exist	N/A	–	4.7
Gallup	1–28 Feb 2022	9,672	49.7	21.9	18.1	10.5	11.1	7.5	13.2	9.7	3.9	3.9	Did not exist	N/A	–	3.8
Maskína	28 Jan–16 Feb 2022	3,039	–	21.9	16.9	12.9	13.4	7.6	10.3	9.7	3.9	3.5	Did not exist	N/A	–	5.0
Gallup	1–31 Jan 2022	10,911	50.4	22.4	17.0	10.7	10.8	8.8	12.5	9.4	3.7	4.3	Did not exist	N/A	–	5.4
Maskína	6–19 Jan 2022	1,548	–	20.1	17.8	11.2	12.3	8.5	13.5	9.2	3.7	3.7	Did not exist	N/A	–	3.3
Gallup	1–30 Dec 2021	7,890	51.2	23.3	17.7	10.6	10.5	8.6	12.5	8.7	3.4	4.5	Did not exist	N/A	–	5.6
Gallup	1–30 Nov 2021	10,000	51.0	22.7	17.0	13.0	10.7	8.0	11.8	8.4	3.8	4.4	Did not exist	N/A	–	5.7
Gallup	1–31 Oct 2021	8,899	50.6	22.8	17.2	13.4	9.8	7.9	11.0	8.9	4.3	4.6	Did not exist	N/A	–	5.6
MMR	12–18 Oct 2021	967	–	21.1	17.9	12.1	10.1	7.8	11.7	10.0	3.2	5.5	Did not exist	N/A	–	3.2
2021 parliamentary election	25 Sep 2021	–	–	24.39	17.27	12.57	9.93	8.85	8.63	8.33	5.45	4.10	–	0.07	0.42	7.12

== Results ==
Results showed no party winning a majority in the Althing, with the Social Democratic Alliance outperforming the ruling Independence Party to win a plurality of seats. The election saw the worst performance by the Independence Party, Progressive Party, the Left-Green Movement, and the Pirate Party in each of the parties' histories, while Viðreisn, the People's Party, and the Centre Party saw their best performance in each of the parties' histories. This follows a trend of Icelanders voting against every post 2008 recession government except for 2021.

The Left-Green Movement and the Pirate Party lost all of their parliamentary representation, with each failing to obtain a seat for the first time since their foundation in 1999 and 2013 respectively.

Party	Votes	%	Seats	+/–
Social Democratic Alliance	44,091	20.75	15	+9
Independence Party	41,143	19.36	14	–2
Viðreisn	33,606	15.82	11	+6
People's Party	29,288	13.78	10	+4
Centre Party	25,700	12.10	8	+5
Progressive Party	16,578	7.80	5	–8
Socialist Party	8,422	3.96	0	0
Pirate Party	6,411	3.02	0	–6
Left-Green Movement	4,974	2.34	0	–8
Democratic Party	2,215	1.04	0	New
Responsible Future	42	0.02	0	0
Total	212,470	100.00	63	0
Valid votes	212,470	98.72		
Invalid votes	308	0.14		
Blank votes	2,438	1.13		
Total votes	215,216	100.00		
Registered voters/turnout	268,422	80.18		
Source: Statistics Iceland

=== By constituency ===
Vote percentages
Constituency	S	D	C	F	M	B	J	P	V
Reykjavík North	26.1	17.4	16.3	11.9	8.9	4.0	5.9	5.4	2.9
Reykjavík South	22.9	17.6	17.7	13.5	10.5	4.4	5.6	3.9	2.9
Southwest	19.3	23.4	20.1	11.0	12.0	5.9	2.8	2.8	1.5
Northwest	15.9	18.0	12.6	16.7	14.8	13.3	3.4	1.8	2.7
Northeast	21.3	15.0	9.4	14.3	15.7	14.2	3.8	1.8	3.8
South	17.3	19.6	11.2	20.0	13.6	12.0	2.4	1.3	1.3

Seats
Constituency	S	D	C	F	M	B	Total
Reykjavík North	4	2	3	1	1	0	11
Reykjavík South	3	3	2	2	1	0	11
Southwest	3	4	3	2	2	0	14
Northwest	1	1	1	2	1	1	7
Northeast	2	2	1	1	2	2	10
South	2	2	1	2	1	2	10

== Government formation ==
People's Party leader Inga Sæland expressed an interest in joining a governing coalition and said she favored a coalition consisting of her own party, the Social Democratic Alliance, and Viðreisn. However, she did not explicitly rule out any party. This followed with praise from the leader of the Social Democratic Alliance Kristrún Frostadóttir for Inga's work on repairing issues affecting the elderly and disabled.

Kristrún Frostadóttir also expressed interest in forming a government, but did not rule out any party, but signaled that if she formed a coalition with the Independence Party, she said they would need to change their policies. However, she said she preferred a coalition with those who were ideologically closer to her party. There was talk also about the possibility of forming the biggest parliamentary majority between the three largest parties (S, D, and C), similarly to what was done in the last parliamentary session.

Viðreisn's leader Þorgerður Katrín Gunnarsdóttir also expressed an interest in forming a government and said she was interested in joining a "coherent" government and was not seeking to become Prime Minister. Election results showed that her party could play a kingmaker role in who forms the next government and would be able to provide a majority (if it comes down) to either a possible centrist left-leaning coalition with the Social Democrats and People's or possibly with Independence and the Centre Party, which is more right-leaning.

Centre Party leader Sigmundur Davíð Gunnlaugsson met with President Halla Tómasdóttir on 2 December. He stated that he believed that Social Democratic Alliance leader Kristrún Frostadóttir should get the first mandate to form a government, as her party won first and said he did not rule out joining a government with any party. He stated he would implement "real changes", if he does enter a coalition. Independence Party leader and Prime Minister Bjarni Benediktsson also met with Halla and stated that he would not be making any special effort in asking for a mandate to forming a government, stating nothing was achieved in getting it and not being able to do anything with it, if received. He also stated he intended to meet with his party to decide on how to proceed, following the elections.

On 3 December, Halla gave Kristrún the first mandate and expressed interest in trying to form a government with her own party, Viðreisn, and the People's Party. On 4 December, Kristrún Frostadóttir began the formal process of forming a government consisting of Social Democratic Alliance, Viðreisn and the People's Party. If successfully formed, the government would have 36 of the 63 seats in the Althing. The coalition leaders were dubbed as "valkyries", citing that the three parties are led by women.

On 21 December, Kristrún Frostadóttir formed her cabinet and was appointed prime minister. The cabinet consists of four ministers from Kristrún's Social Democratic Alliance, four from Þorgerður's Viðreisn, and three from Inga's People's Party.
