= Kristrún Frostadóttir =

Prime Minister of Iceland since 2024

- Kristrún in 2026

Prime Minister of Iceland
- Incumbent
- Assumed office 21 December 2024
- President: Halla Tómasdóttir
- Preceded by: Bjarni Benediktsson

Leader of the Social Democratic Alliance
- Incumbent
- Assumed office 28 October 2022
- Preceded by: Logi Már Einarsson

Member of the Althing
- Incumbent
- Assumed office 25 September 2021
- Constituency: Reykjavík South (2021–2024); Reykjavík North (2024–)

Personal details
- Born: 12 May 1988 (age 38) Reykjavík, Iceland
- Party: Social Democratic Alliance
- Spouse: Einar Bergur Ingvarsson
- Children: 2
- Education: University of Iceland (BS); Yale University (MA); Boston University (MA)

Kristrún Mjöll Frostadóttir (Icelandic: [ˈkʰrɪstrun ˈmjœtl̥ ˈfrɔstaˌtouhtɪr̥]; born 12 May 1988) is an Icelandic politician and economist who has served as the prime minister of Iceland since 2024, and leader of the Social Democratic Alliance since 2022. First elected to the Althing in the 2021 parliamentary election, she became Iceland's youngest-ever prime minister at the age of 36. As of March 2026, she is the world's second-youngest serving head of government behind Balen Shah.

== Early life and education ==
Kristrún was born in Reykjavík to Frosti Fífill Jóhannsson, an ethnographer, and Steinunn Guðný H. Jónsdóttir, a physician. She graduated from Reykjavik Junior College, where she developed a strong interest in languages. During her youth, she spent a year at Bury Grammar School in Manchester, attended a Danish language summer camp, and later studied Spanish while spending a summer in the Basque Country.

She earned a bachelor's degree in economics from the University of Iceland in 2011. Although she initially planned to pursue a PhD in economics in the United States, she instead chose to focus on public policy. She completed a master's degree in economics at Boston University in 2014, followed by a master's degree in global affairs from the Yale Jackson School of Global Affairs in 2016.

== Career ==
Kristrún began her career as an assistant at the Central Bank of Iceland, where she worked until 2010. She then joined the analysis department of Arion Bank, remaining there until 2012. Between 2012 and 2014, she worked as a journalist for the business newspaper Viðskiptablaðið from its New York City office.

From 2015 to 2017, she worked as an equity research associate at Morgan Stanley in both New York and later London. After returning to Iceland in 2017, she became chief economist at the Icelandic Chamber of Commerce. She later served as a lecturer in the Department of Economics at the University of Iceland and subsequently as chief economist at Kvika Bank before entering politics in 2021.

== Political career ==
=== Parliament ===
Kristrún was elected as a member of the Althing for the Reykjavík South constituency at the 2021 parliamentary election. At the 2024 snap election, she was elected to represent the Reykjavík North constituency.

Prior to becoming prime minister, she sat on the Budget Committee between 2021 and 2024, with a brief stint on the Economic Affairs and Trade Committee in 2023.

=== Party leadership ===
She announced her candidacy for the party leadership in August 2022 and was later elected at the party congress in October unopposed with 94% of the vote.

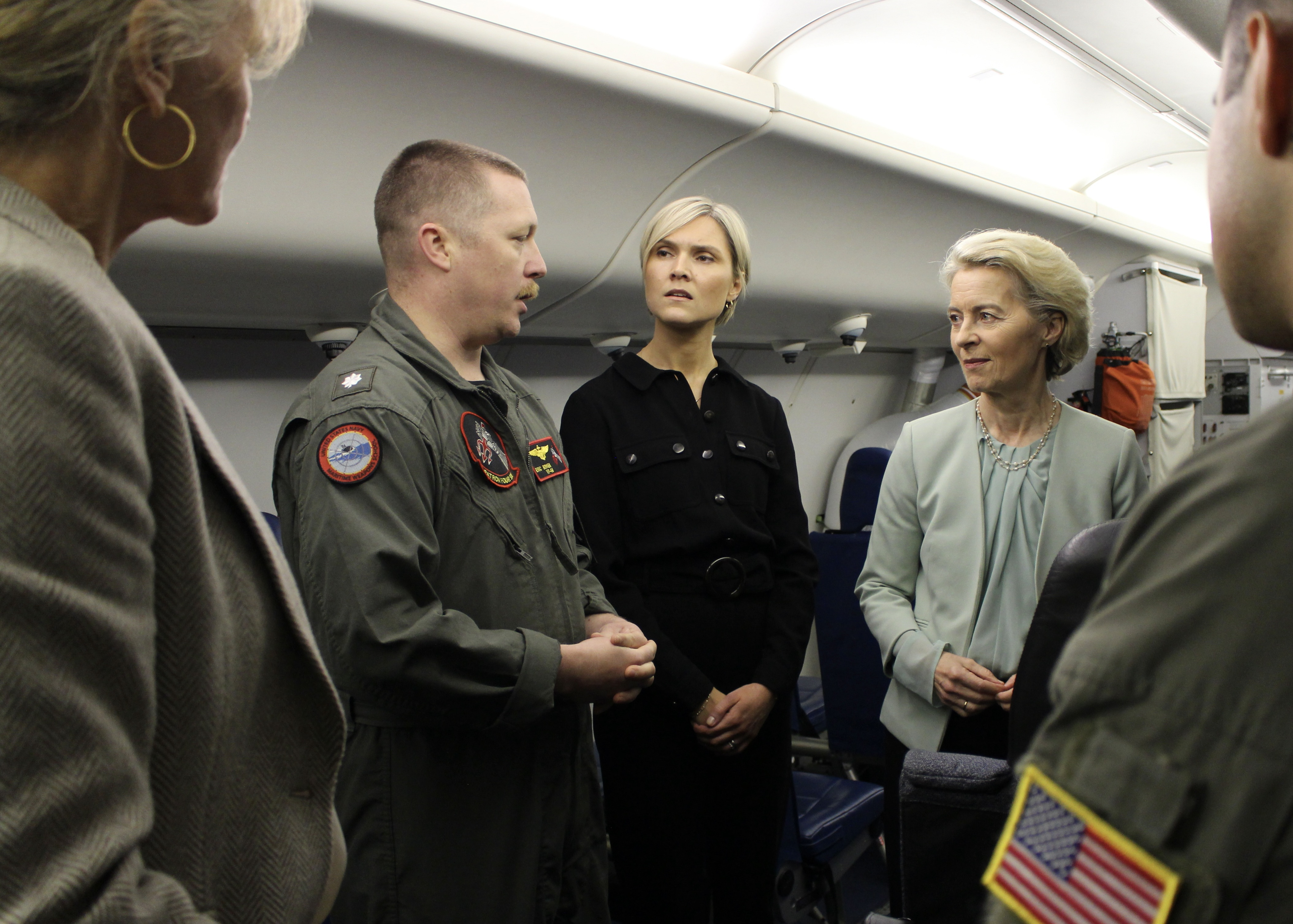
Kristrún with Ursula von der Leyen and Eric Bowen on 17 July 2025 at Keflavik Airport

=== Prime Minister of Iceland (2024–present) ===
Kristrún led her party into the 2024 snap election, securing 20.8% of the vote and 15 seats in the Althing. She held coalition negotiations with the Viðreisn and People's Party which began on 4 December and concluded seventeen days later, when she was appointed prime minister along with her cabinet.

She called for a ceasefire in Gaza during a meeting with President Trump in June 2025. In 2026, she was prime minister during the Icelandic European Union membership negotiations referendum. After the referendum was rejected, Kristrún said that the referendum outcome will be respected and described it as "a victory for democracy" due to the high turnout rate of over 80%.

On September 7, 2026, United States President Donald Trump posted to Truth Social a map of all of North America, the Caribbean, as well as Greenland and Iceland colored in with the American flag. In response, Kristrún denounced the edited map as "an insult to Icelanders, Canadians and Greenlanders," and summoned US ambassador Billy Long to communicate that such a post is unacceptable to make.

== Personal life ==
Kristrún is married to Einar Bergur Ingvarsson, and they have two daughters, born in 2019 and 2023. Einar had previously earned an MBA from Yale University, a connection that influenced Kristrún's decision to pursue graduate studies at Yale.

Party political offices
Preceded by Logi Már Einarsson	Leader of the Social Democratic Alliance; 2022–present	Incumbent
Political offices
Preceded by Bjarni Benediktsson	Prime Minister of Iceland; 2024–present	Incumbent
