= People's Party (Iceland) =

People's Party Flokkur fólksins
- Chairperson: Inga Sæland
- Vice-chairperson: Guðmundur Ingi Kristinsson
- Secretary: Sigurjón Arnórsson
- Chairman of the parliamentary group: Guðmundur Ingi Kristinsson
- Founder: Inga Sæland
- Founded: 27 January 2016; 10 years ago
- Ideology: Populism; Pensioner interests
- Political position: Centre-left
- Nordic affiliation: Centre Group
- Colours: Yellow; Magenta; Dark grey
- Seats in Parliament: 10 / 63

Election symbol
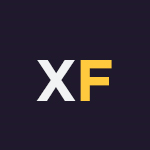

Website
- flokkurfolksins.is
- Politics of Iceland; Political parties; Elections; A: Also described as centrist and left-wing.

The party's old logo (c. 2018)

The People's Party (Icelandic: Flokkur fólksins) is an Icelandic political party, with an emphasis on disability rights, pensioners' interests, and direct democracy. It currently sits in government.

The People's Party was founded in 2016 by Inga Sæland. The party defines itself as "based on a message of love", its articles of association stating its goals as "[fighting] with thought, word and will for Icelanders who have suffered injustices, differences, lawlessness and poverty."

The People's Party entered majority government with Liberal Reform and Social Democrats in 2024. One of their ministers was forced to resign after 3 months when it was revealed that she had an affair with a 15-year-old boy when she was 22 and had a child with him a year later. She had met the boy through Christian youth work.

In April 2026 its deputy leader, MP and former minister, Guðmundur Ingi Kristinsson left the party. He cited the reason as "a breach of confidentiality concerning personal communications within the party".

== Policies ==
In the 2021 parliamentary election, the party's electoral priorities were:

=== Welfare and the fight against poverty ===
- The minimum subsistence level will be ISK 350,000, tax- and deduction-free.
- Introduce a new social security system that ensures a minimum subsistence level and the abolition of deduction of state support because of income. Do not let interactive austerity rules lock people in a poverty trap.

=== The disabled ===
- Allow all disabled people who can to try their skills in the labor market for two years without any deduction in state support and without their disability being reassessed.
- Encourage the individual to be self-sufficient and never punish them or reduce the income of those who want and can save themselves in some way.
- All aids equipment should be exempt from VAT.
- Ratification of the United Nations Convention on the Rights of Persons with Disabilities.

=== Senior citizens ===
- Increase the free income limit for old-age pensions of the state's pension income from ISK 25,000 up to ISK 100,000.
- Abolish deductions to the state's old-age pensions due to employment income.
- Ensure the safety of the elderly in residential and nursing accommodations.

=== Pension funds ===
- Ensure increased democracy and transparency in pension funds.
- Ensure that pension rights are inherited upon death.

=== Health care ===
- Fully secure the funding of the health care system.
- Eliminate waiting lists for necessary health care.
- Ensure that people born with blemishes receive reimbursement for medical procedures from the Icelandic health insurance.
- Never accept that children have to wait for urgent medical attention.

=== Housing market ===
- Abolish inflation indexing of mortgages.
- Enable people to refinance inflation-indexed loans with non-indexed loans without being subject to a credit rating and payment assessment.
- Abolish the high prepayment fees on loan agreements that the Housing Financing Fund made at the time.
- Fight against housing shortages by creating incentives for increased construction of new housing.

=== Fisheries ===
- Full price for access to the marine resource and the fishing quota.
- A new fishery policy based on the fishing grounds around Iceland being the common property of the nation and not private property.
- Ensure that the inhabitants of coastal villages enjoy an increased right to utilize marine resources with a positive effect on the fishing grounds across the country.
- Boost coastal fishing by making handline fishing free.
- The nation should receive full price for access to its resources.
- Enactment of a provision on national ownership of natural resources in the constitution.

=== Student loans ===
- Give students freedom to earn extra income without cuts in students loans.

=== Environment and climate change ===
- The People's Party views man-made climate change as a grave global environmental problem.
- Iceland should take an active part in the fight against climate change through international co-operation.
- Wetland restoration, the electrification of the car fleet, environmentally friendly energy for ships, the production of renewable energy and increased forestry are the countermeasures Iceland should emphasize.
- Iceland should take responsibility in the fight against climate change without environmental protection measures affecting the public who have little financial means.
- Against green taxes that increase inequality and poverty. Those who pollute the most should pay the most.
- Iceland's clean energy sources should be wisely used to reduce pollution, while at the same time considering nature conservation.

=== The highlands ===
- Oppose restrictions on the public freedom of movement within the country to enjoy their own nature. The Highlands of Iceland cannot be institutionalized in the form of a national park with associated ministerial powers at the expense of public access. We trust the locals in the surrounding municipalities to take care of the Highlands.
- It is extremely important that the public has easy access to the refreshing paradise of the Highlands free of charge. Not everyone can afford to travel abroad. Icelanders have enjoyed it for a long time, for example within the framework of outdoor clubs, and have generally been successful. We trust these people to enjoy the highlands, and to respect and protect them at the same time.

=== Funding of campaign promises ===
- Abolish the pension fund exemption to withhold taxes upon deposit to the pension funds. Thus, the cash payment will be taken immediately upon deposit, but not when the funds are paid out as currently. To give the Treasury "tens of billions of dollars annually" in increased revenues without compromising the people's pension rights.
- Transfer the personal tax credit from the rich to the poorer.
- Full price will be charged for access to marine resources.
- Re-implementation of the bank tax, as there is no real competition as the banks' profits prove.
- Clean up the system and reduce any unnecessary government spending.

== Controversies and expulsions ==
At the end of November 2018, the party expelled two of its parliamentarians, Karl Gauti Hjaltason and Ólafur Ísleifsson, after they met with members of the Centre Party and did not object to derogatory remarks made about People's Party leader Inga Sæland.

At the end of March 2025, Ásthildur Lóa Þórsdóttir served as minister of education and children's affairs for four months until she resigned due to a scandal involving a sexual relationship with a 15-year-old boy when she was in her early 20s.

In April 2026 the former Minister of Education Guðmundur Ingi Kristinsson resigned from the parliamentary group citing personal disagreement with party leadership. He later came out and said that he was outraged by the treatment he and his family got from the party leader Inga Sæland pressuring him to resign as minister when he was recuperating from a surgery in hospital. Personal text message between Guðmundur and his advisor was published in the media. In it the advisor (also the wife of the incoming minister, Ragnar Þór Ingólfsson) wrote that the options are either to resign or go to war, and that the decision had been made by the leaders of the government parties. The Prime Minister, Frostadóttir denied putting any pressure on Guðmundur while the leader of the People's Party said it was a matter of different experiences for her and Guðmundur of the matter. This matter was likened to Tv drama series, House of Cards and Bold and the beautiful by political commentators.

== Election results ==
Election	Leader	Votes	%	Seats	+/–	Position	Government
2016	Inga Sæland	6,707	3.54	0 / 63	New	8th	Extra-parliamentary
2017	Inga Sæland	13,502	6.88	4 / 63	▲4	▲7th	Opposition
2021	Inga Sæland	17,672	8.85	6 / 63	▲2	▲5th	Opposition
2024	Inga Sæland	29,288	13.78	10 / 63	▲4	▲4th	Coalition
