= List of members of the Althing, 2024–2028 =

This is a list of members of the Althing, the national legislature of Iceland, elected at the parliamentary election held on 30 November 2024, and subsequent changes during the legislative term.

== Members ==
Name	Constituency	Seat Type	Votes	Party	Took office	Left office	Notes
Alma Möller	Southwest	Con.	12,217.17	Social Democratic Alliance	30 November 2024		
Arna Lára Jónsdóttir	Northwest	Con.	2,859.67	Social Democratic Alliance	30 November 2024		
Ása Berglind Hjálmarsdóttir	South	Con.	4,136.50	Social Democratic Alliance	30 November 2024		
Áslaug Arna Sigurbjörnsdóttir	Reykjavík South	Con.	6,463.17	Independence Party	30 November 2024		
Ásthildur Lóa Þórsdóttir	South	Con.	6,339.00	People's Party	30 November 2024		
Bergþór Ólason	Southwest	Con.	7,580.00	Centre Party	30 November 2024		
Bjarni Benediktsson	Southwest	Con.	14,451.88	Independence Party	30 November 2024		
Bryndís Haraldsdóttir	Southwest	Con.	11,324.75	Independence Party	30 November 2024		
Dagbjört Hákonardóttir	Reykjavík North	Com.	6,237.62	Social Democratic Alliance	30 November 2024		
Dagur B. Eggertsson	Reykjavík North	Con.	7,181.25	Social Democratic Alliance	30 November 2024		
Diljá Mist Einarsdóttir	Reykjavík North	Con.	4,845.25	Independence Party	30 November 2024		
Eiríkur Björn Björgvinsson	Southwest	Con.	8,579.67	Viðreisn	30 November 2024		
Eydís Ásbjörnsdóttir	Northeast	Con.	3,906.25	Social Democratic Alliance	30 November 2024		
Eyjólfur Ármannsson	Northwest	Con.	3,019.75	People's Party	30 November 2024		
Grímur Grímsson	Reykjavík North	Com.	4,029.67	Viðreisn	30 November 2024		
Guðbrandur Einarsson	South	Con.	3,525.00	Viðreisn	30 November 2024		
Guðlaugur Þór Þórðarson	Reykjavík North	Con.	6,247.00	Independence Party	30 November 2024		
Guðmundur Ari Sigurjónsson	Southwest	Con.	10,272.83	Social Democratic Alliance	30 November 2024		
Guðmundur Ingi Kristinsson	Southwest	Con.	7,008.00	People's Party	30 November 2024		
Guðrún Hafsteinsdóttir	South	Con.	6,207.00	Independence Party	30 November 2024		
Halla Hrund Logadóttir	South	Con.	3,606.00	Progressive Party	30 November 2024		
Hanna Katrín Friðriksson	Reykjavík North	Con.	6,027.33	Viðreisn	30 November 2024		
Hildur Sverrisdóttir	Reykjavík South	Con.	5,437.67	Independence Party	30 November 2024		
Inga Sæland	Reykjavík South	Con.	5,017.50	People's Party	30 November 2024		
Ingibjörg Davíðsdóttir	Northwest	Con.	2,664.33	Centre Party	30 November 2024		
Ingibjörg Ólöf Isaksen	Northeast	Con.	3,436.75	Progressive Party	30 November 2024		
Ingvar Þóroddsson	Northeast	Con.	2,291.00	Viðreisn	30 November 2024		
Jens Garðar Helgason	Northeast	Con.	3,563.00	Independence Party	30 November 2024		
Jóhann Páll Jóhannsson	Reykjavík South	Con.	8,504.67	Social Democratic Alliance	30 November 2024		
Jón Gnarr	Reykjavík South	Con.	4,776.25	Viðreisn	30 November 2024		
Jón Pétur Zimsen	Reykjavík South	Com.	4,382.17	Independence Party	30 November 2024		
Jónína Björk Óskarsdóttir	Southwest	Com.	5,262.00	People's Party	30 November 2024		
Karl Gauti Hjaltason	South	Con.	4,174.33	Centre Party	30 November 2024		
Kolbrún Baldursdóttir	Reykjavík South	Com.	3,757.75	People's Party	30 November 2024		
Kristján Þórður Snæbjarnarson	Reykjavík South	Con.	5,688.17	Social Democratic Alliance	30 November 2024		
Kristrún Frostadóttir	Reykjavík North	Con.	9,598.62	Social Democratic Alliance	30 November 2024		
Lilja Rafney Magnúsdóttir	Northwest	Com.	2,251.50	People's Party	30 November 2024		
Logi Már Einarsson	Northeast	Con.	5,104.00	Social Democratic Alliance	30 November 2024		
María Rut Kristinsdóttir	Northwest	Con.	2,285.00	Viðreisn	30 November 2024		
Nanna Margrét Gunnlaugsdóttir	Southwest	Con.	5,786.50	Centre Party	30 November 2024		
Njáll Trausti Friðbertsson	Northeast	Con.	2,712.00	Independence Party	30 November 2024		
Ólafur Adolfsson	Northwest	Con.	3,239.00	Independence Party	30 November 2024		
Pawel Bartoszek	Reykjavík North	Con.	4,944.83	Viðreisn	30 November 2024		
Ragna Sigurðardóttir	Reykjavík South	Con.	7,120.50	Social Democratic Alliance	30 November 2024		
Ragnar Þór Ingólfsson	Reykjavík North	Con.	4,387.67	People's Party	30 November 2024		
Rósa Guðbjartsdóttir	Southwest	Com.	9,373.62	Independence Party	30 November 2024		
Sigmar Guðmundsson	Southwest	Con.	10,640.50	Viðreisn	30 November 2024		
Sigmundur Davíð Gunnlaugsson	Northeast	Con.	3,795.00	Centre Party	30 November 2024		
Sigríður Á. Andersen	Reykjavík North	Con.	3,242.33	Centre Party	30 November 2024		
Sigurður Helgi Pálmason	South	Con.	4,767.50	People's Party	30 November 2024		
Sigurður Ingi Jóhannsson	South	Com.	2,894.50	Progressive Party	30 November 2024		
Sigurjón Þórðarson	Northeast	Con.	3,456.33	People's Party	30 November 2024		
Snorri Másson	Reykjavík South	Con.	3,883.67	Centre Party	30 November 2024		
Stefán Vagn Stefánsson	Northwest	Con.	2,343.33	Progressive Party	30 November 2024		
Víðir Reynisson	South	Con.	5,490.50	Social Democratic Alliance	30 November 2024		
Vilhjálmur Árnason	South	Con.	4,677.75	Independence Party	30 November 2024		
Þórarinn Ingi Pétursson	Northeast	Com.	2,568.00	Progressive Party	30 November 2024		
Þorbjörg Sigríður Gunnlaugsdóttir	Reykjavík South	Con.	6,547.50	Viðreisn	30 November 2024		
Þórdís Kolbrún R. Gylfadóttir	Southwest	Con.	12,660.50	Independence Party	30 November 2024		
Þórður Snær Júlíusson	Reykjavík North	Con.	7,185.75	Social Democratic Alliance	30 November 2024		
Þorgerður Katrín Gunnarsdóttir	Southwest	Con.	12,698.83	Viðreisn	30 November 2024		
Þorgrímur Sigmundsson	Northeast	Con.	2,848.50	Centre Party	30 November 2024		
Þórunn Sveinbjarnardóttir	Southwest	Con.	8,166.00	Social Democratic Alliance	30 November 2024		
