= Kolbrún =

Kolbrún is a given name. Notable people with the name include:

- Kolbrún María Ármannsdóttir, Icelandic basketball player
- Kolbrún Baldursdóttir (born 1959), Icelandic politician
- Kolbrún Halldórsdóttir (born 1955), Icelandic politician
- Kolbrún Ýr Kristjánsdóttir (born 1982), Icelandic swimmer
- Kolbrún Ólafsdóttir (1933–1960), Icelandic swimmer
- Anna Kolbrún Árnadóttir (1970–2023), Icelandic politician
- Þórdís Kolbrún R. Gylfadóttir (born 1987), Icelandic lawyer
- Erla Kolbrún Svavarsdóttir (born 1961), Icelandic professor
