= Ragna Sigurðardóttir =

Ragna Sigurðardóttir may refer to:

- Ragna Sigurðardóttir (author) (born 1962), Icelandic writer and artist
- Ragna Sigurðardóttir (politician) (born 1992), Icelandic politician
