= Hildur Sverrisdóttir =

Icelandic politician (born 1978)

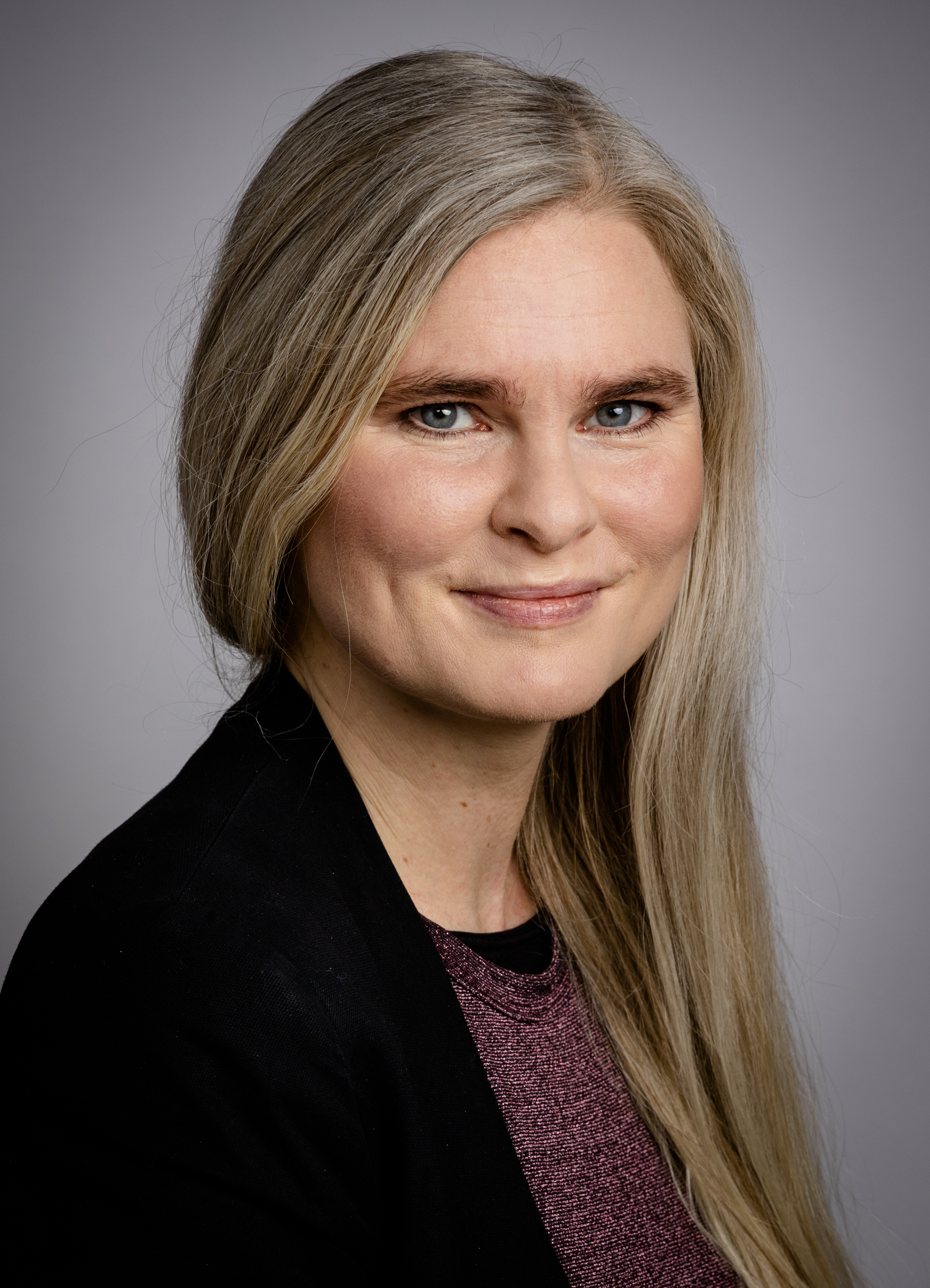
- Hildur Sverrisdóttir in 2021

Member of the Althing
- Incumbent
- Assumed office 2017
- Constituency: Reykjavík South

Personal details
- Born: 22 October 1978 (age 47) Stockholm, Sweden
- Party: Independence
- Education: Reykjavik University
- Website: https://www.althingi.is/altext/cv/is/?nfaerslunr=1279

Hildur Sverrisdóttir (born 22 October 1978) is an Icelandic lawyer and a member of the Icelandic Parliament for the Independence Party in the Reykjavík South constituency.

== Life and work ==
Hildur was born in Stockholm, Sweden to Sverrir Einarsson (1948–1998), a teacher and principal of Hamrahlíð High School, and Rannveig Auður Jóhannsdóttir (b. 1949), a teacher and lecturer at the School of Education at the University of Iceland.

She graduated from Hamrahlíð High School in 2000, obtained a law degree from Reykjavík University in 2008, and was admitted to the District Court in 2009. Hildur was the managing director of Peer Education from 1997 to 2000, worked at the law firm Ambrose Appelbe Solicitors in London, England from 2001 to 2003, and was the managing director of the Reykjavík Dance Festival in 2007. She worked as a lawyer and attorney at the media company 365 from 2007 to 2012, was a deputy city councilor for the Independence Party in Reykjavík from 2010 to 2016, and a city councilor from 2016 to 2017. Hildur took a seat in the Althing upon the death of Ólöf Nordal in 2017 but was not elected in the elections later that year but was the party's 1st deputy in the Reykjavík South constituency for the remainder of the term. In January 2018, Hildur was appointed assistant to Þórdís Kolbrún Reykfjörður Gylfadóttir, Minister of Tourism, Industry and Innovation. Hildur was elected to parliament in the 2021 Icelandic parliamentary election. In September 2023, Hildur was made parliamentary party leader of the Independence Party.

Hildur participated in the joint primary election of the Independence Party in Reykjavík on 3 September 2016 and finished in 7th place. She was ranked 4th on the party's list in the Reykjavík constituency south for the 2016 general election and ended up as the party's 1st deputy in the constituency. Upon the death of Ólafur Nordal in 2017, Hildur took a seat in parliament until later that year, when the 2017 general election took place. In those elections, she was ranked 3rd on the party's list but was not elected.

In the Independence Party's primary election in Reykjavík for the 2021 Icelandic parliamentary election, Hildur finished in 4th place, outperforming the party's three incumbent MPs. She subsequently placed 2nd on the party's list in the Reykjavík South constituency in the parliamentary elections and was elected as the constituency's 5th MP.

Hildur was the editor of the book Fantasíur which was published in 2012 and was a Bakþanka columnist in Fréttablaðið from 2013 - 2016.
