= Lilja Dögg Alfreðsdóttir =

Icelandic politician (born 1973)

Lilja Alfreðsdóttir
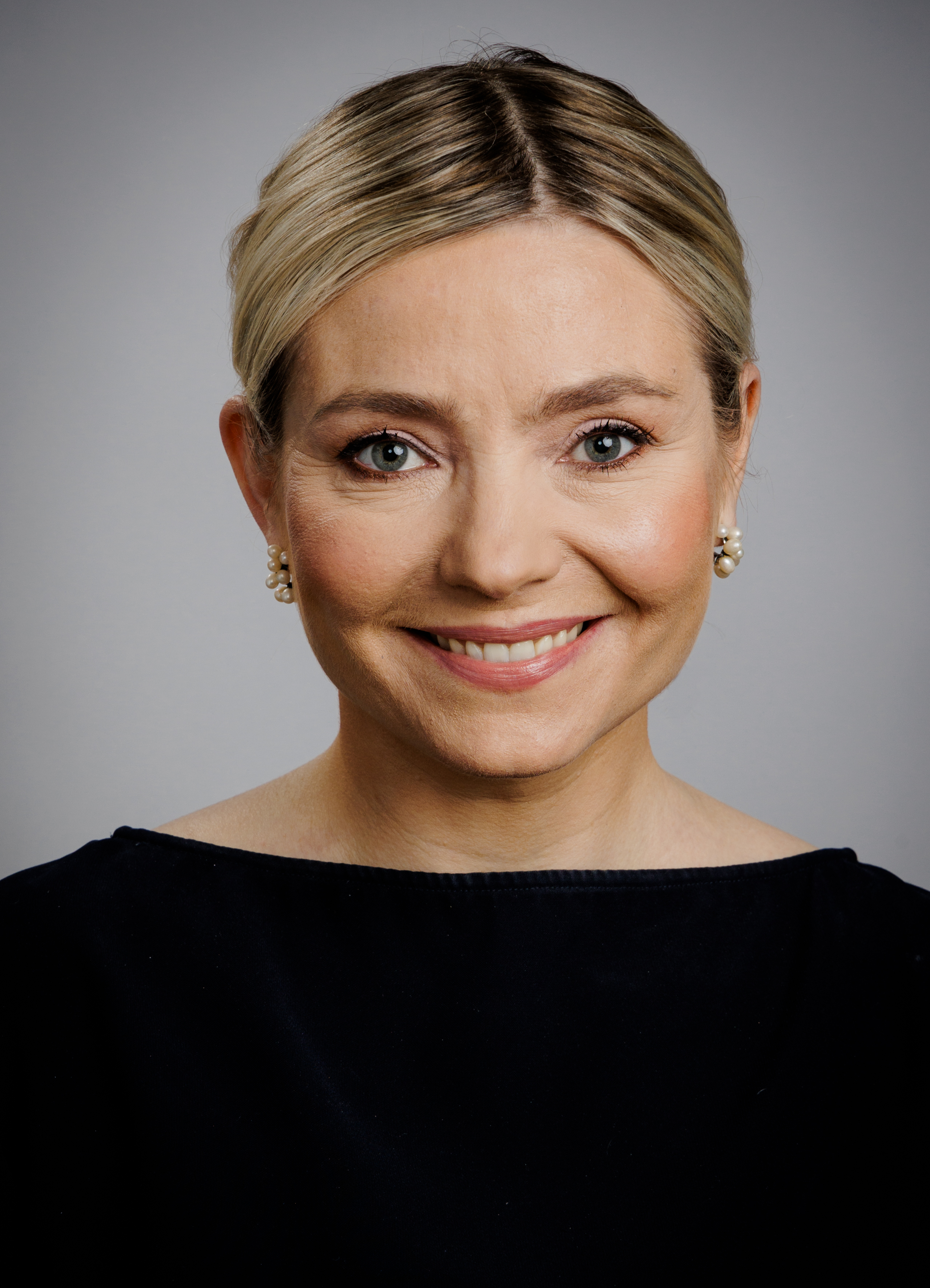
- Official portrait, 2021

Minister of Tourism, Trade and Culture
- In office 28 November 2021 – 21 December 2024
- Prime Minister: Katrín Jakobsdóttir; Bjarni Benediktsson
- Preceded by: Þórdís Kolbrún R. Gylfadóttir (Tourism, Industry, and Innovation)
- Succeeded by: Logi Már Einarsson (Culture, Innovation and Universities); Hanna Katrín Friðriksson (Industries)

Minister of Education, Science and Culture
- In office 30 November 2017 – 28 November 2021
- Prime Minister: Katrín Jakobsdóttir
- Preceded by: Kristján Þór Júlíusson
- Succeeded by: Ásmundur Einar Daðason (Education and Children's Affairs)

Chairman of the Progressive Party
- Incumbent
- Assumed office 15 February 2026
- Preceded by: Sigurður Ingi Jóhannsson

Minister of Foreign Affairs
- In office 7 April 2016 – 11 January 2017
- Prime Minister: Sigurður Ingi Jóhannsson
- Preceded by: Gunnar Bragi Sveinsson
- Succeeded by: Guðlaugur Þór Þórðarson

Member of the Althing
- Incumbent
- Assumed office 29 October 2016

Personal details
- Born: 4 October 1973 (age 52) Reykjavík, Iceland
- Party: Progressive
- Spouse: Magnús Óskar Hafsteinsson
- Children: 2

Lilja Dögg Alfreðsdóttir (born 4 October 1973) is an Icelandic politician and chair of the Progressive party who served as the Minister of Tourism, Trade and Culture from November 2021 to December 2024. As a member of the Althing (Iceland's parliament) for the Reykjavík South constituency from 2016 to 2024, she previously served as the Minister of Education, Science and Culture from 2017 to 2021 and Minister of Foreign Affairs from 2016 to 2017. During her time as Minister of Education, polling showed her as the minister with the most favorability at nearly 68%.

== Career ==
Lilja was born on 4 October 1973 in Reykjavík. She is the daughter of politician Alfreð Þorsteinsson, a longtime member of the Progressive Party and city councillor, and Guðný Kristjánsdóttir. From 2013 to 2014 she was the president of the student association, Framtíðin, of her secondary school Menntaskólinn í Reykjavík. In 1998 she graduated with her bachelor's degree in political science from the University of Iceland, and then for a year she did exchange studies in macroeconomics and philosophy at the University of Minnesota. In 2001 she graduated with her master's degree in international economics from Columbia University. Lilja has worked for the International Monetary Fund, the Icelandic Central Bank and was an economic advisor to Sigmundur Davíð Gunnlaugsson during his time as prime minister.

Lilja was the Minister of Foreign Affairs in Sigurður Ingi Jóhannson's cabinet from 2016 to 2017, and has been the chairperson of the Progressive Party since 2026.

She has criticised Disney for having too few films and programmes with Icelandic subtitles or dubbed in Icelandic. In 2021, she wrote to Tim Cook, CEO of Apple Inc., asking him to help maintain Icelandic as a language by including it in the voice, text and language collection in their operating systems.

Political offices
Preceded by Gunnar Bragi Sveinsson	Minister for Foreign Affairs; 2016–2017	Succeeded by Guðlaugur Þór Þórðarson
Preceded by Kristján Þór Júlíusson	Minister of Education, Science and Culture; 2017–	Incumbent
