= Jón Gunnarsson =

Icelandic politician (born 1956)

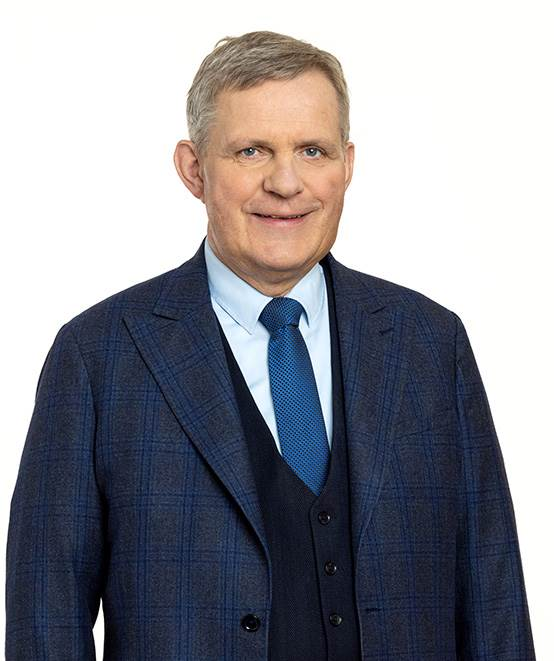

Minister of Justice
- In office 1 February 2022 – 19 June 2023
- Prime Minister: Katrín Jakobsdóttir
- Preceded by: Áslaug Arna Sigurbjörnsdóttir
- Succeeded by: Guðrún Hafsteinsdóttir

Minister of the Interior
- In office 28 November 2021 – 1 February 2022
- Prime Minister: Katrín Jakobsdóttir
- Preceded by: Sigurður Ingi Jóhannsson (Transport and Local Government)
- Succeeded by: office not in use

Minister of Transport and Local Government
- In office 11 January 2017 – 30 November 2017
- Prime Minister: Bjarni Benediktsson
- Preceded by: Ólöf Nordal (Interior)
- Succeeded by: Sigurður Ingi Jóhannsson

Personal details
- Born: 21 September 1956 (age 70) Reykjavík, Iceland
- Party: Independence

Jón Gunnarsson (born 21 September 1956) is an Icelandic politician. His multifaceted career spans various sectors including farming, industry management, and significant roles in Icelandic politics. Notably, he has served as a Member of the Althing for the Southwest Constituency since 2007, representing the Independence Party. His political career is highlighted by his tenure as Minister of Justice from 2022 to 2023, Minister of the Interior from 2021 to 2022, and Minister of Transport and Local Government in 2017.

== Early life, education, and personal life ==
Jón Gunnarsson was born to Gunnar Jónsson, a master electrician, and Erla Dóróthea Magnúsdóttir, a merchant. He embarked on his educational journey at the Industrial School of Reykjavík, completing his education in metalworking in 1975. His academic pursuit continued at the University of Iceland, where he graduated in 1996 with a degree in business and operational management.

In his personal life, Jón married Margrét Halla Ragnarsdóttir, with whom he has three children: Gunnar Bergmann, Arndís Erla, and Arnar Bogi. This phase of his life highlights his commitment to family and his foundational years that shaped his future career path.

== Professional and Political Career ==
Gunnarsson's professional career began in agriculture, where he worked as a farmer at Barkarstaðir in Miðfjörður from 1981 to 1985. He then shifted to the media sector, serving as the Head of the Advertising and Subscription Department at Stöð 2 from 1986 to 1990. His business acumen was further demonstrated in his role as Marketing Manager at Prentsmiðjan Oddi from 1991 to 1993, and later, in co-running the import company Rún ehf with his wife from 1994 to 2004.

His entry into public service was marked by his tenure as the Executive Director of the Icelandic Association for Search and Rescue from 2005 to 2007. Jón's political career is particularly notable, with several ministerial positions including Transport and Local Government Minister in 2017, Interior Minister from 2021 to 2022, and Justice Minister from 2022 to 2023. A member of the Althing for the Southwest Constituency since 2007, representing the Independence Party.
