= Ágúst Ólafur Ágústsson =

Icelandic politician (born 1977)

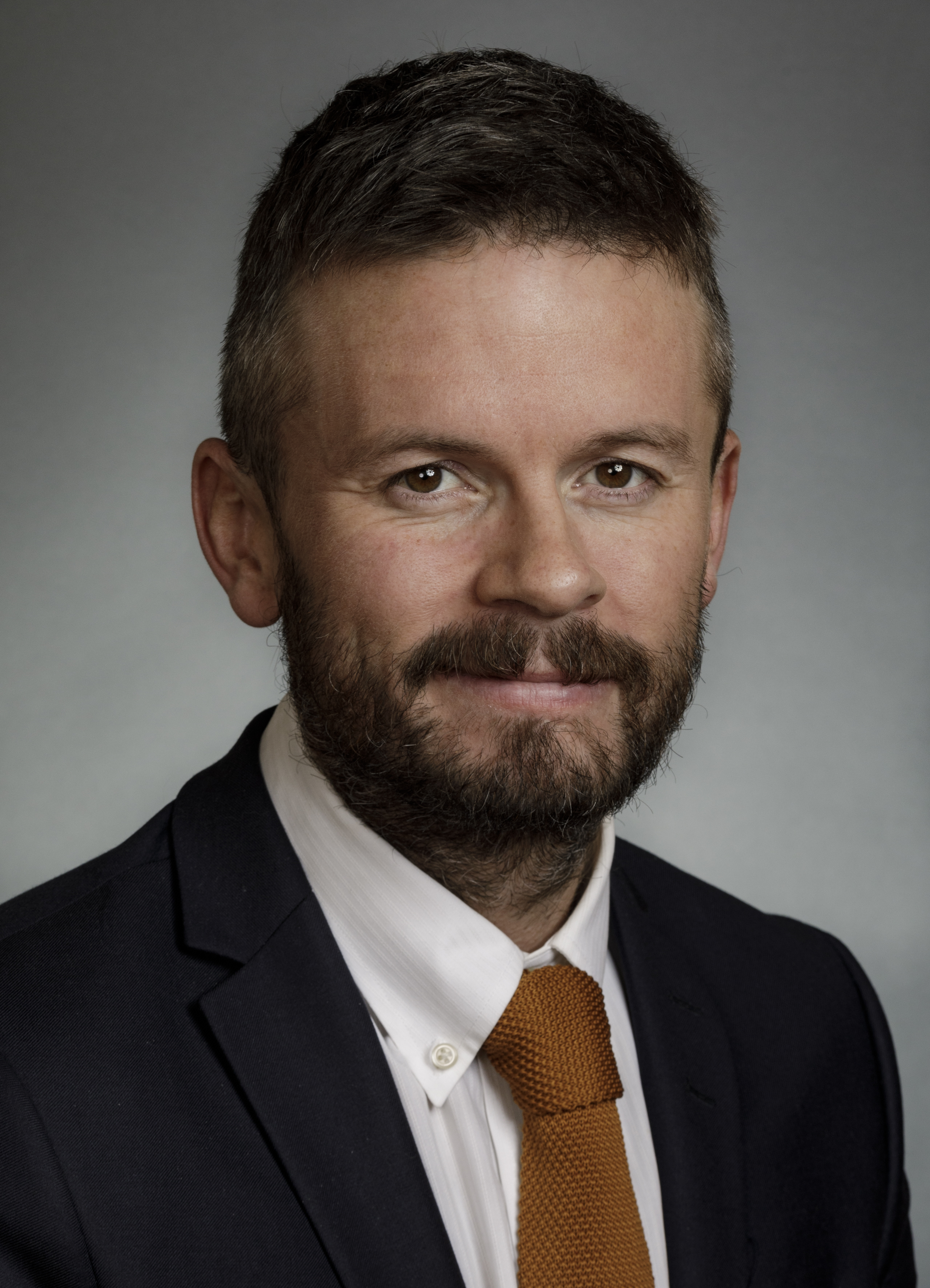
- Official portrait, 2017

Member of the Althing
- In office 28 October 2017 – 25 September 2021
- Constituency: Reykjavik South
- In office 10 May 2003 – 25 April 2009
- Constituency: Reykjavik South

Personal details
- Born: Ágúst Ólafur Ágústsson; 10 March 1977 (age 49) Hamburg, West Germany
- Party: Social Democratic Alliance
- Spouse: Þorbjörg Sigríður Gunnlaugsdóttir (divorced)
- Children: 3
- Education: University of Iceland
- Occupation: Lawyer • Politician

Ágúst Ólafur Ágústsson (born 10 March 1977) is an Icelandic politician from the Social Democratic Alliance. He has represented Reykjavik South in the Parliament of Iceland from 2017 to 2021, previously serving from 2003 to 2009.
