= Björn Leví Gunnarsson =

Icelandic politician (born 1976)

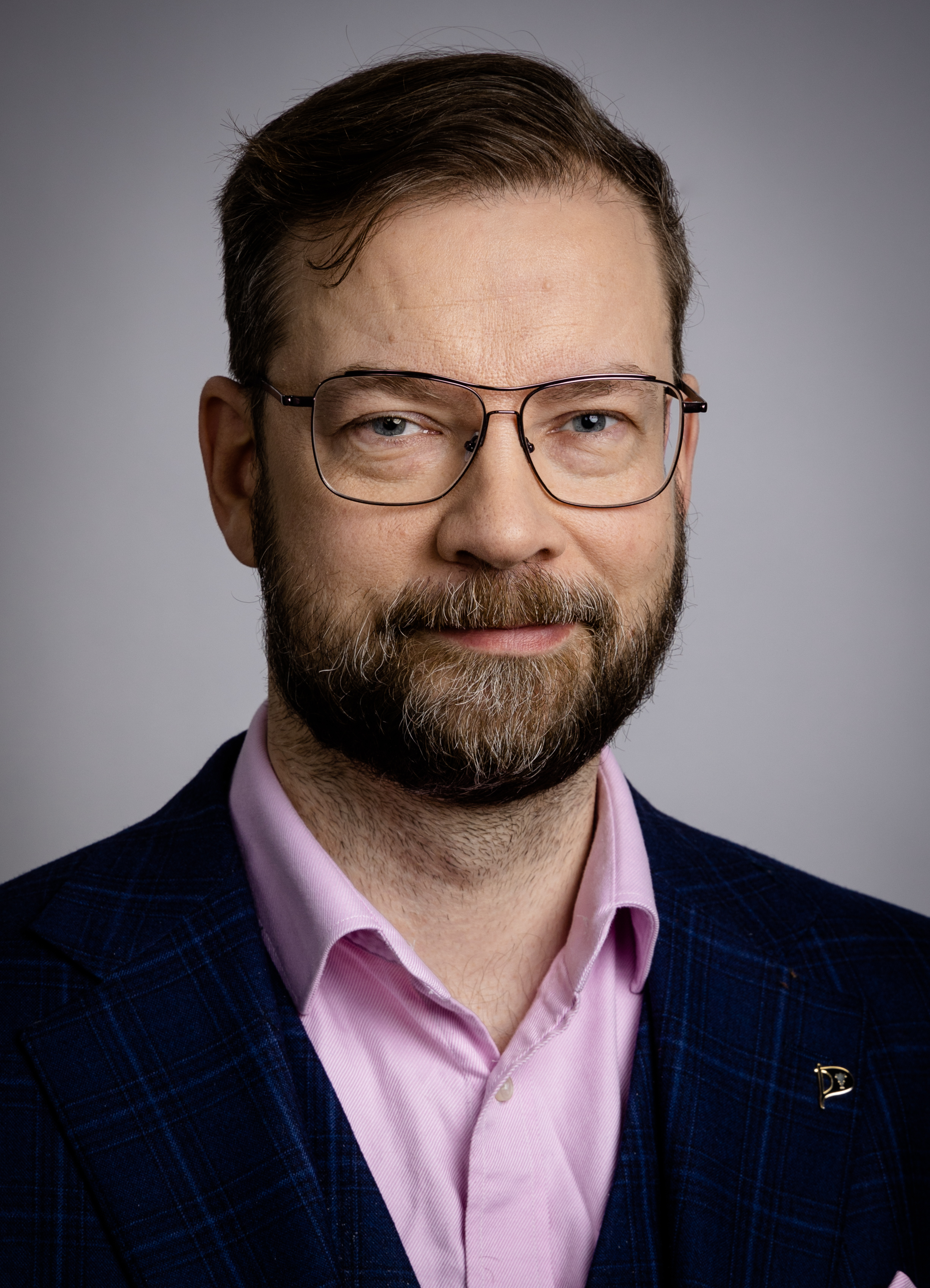
Björn Leví Gunnarsson

Björn Leví Gunnarsson (born 1 June 1976) is a former Icelandic politician from the Pirate Party. He has represented Reykjavik North in the Parliament of Iceland from 2016 to 2017 and Reykjavík South from 2017 to 2024.

He was a member of the Alþingi's budget committee.
