= Áslaug Arna Sigurbjörnsdóttir =

Icelandic politician (born 1990)

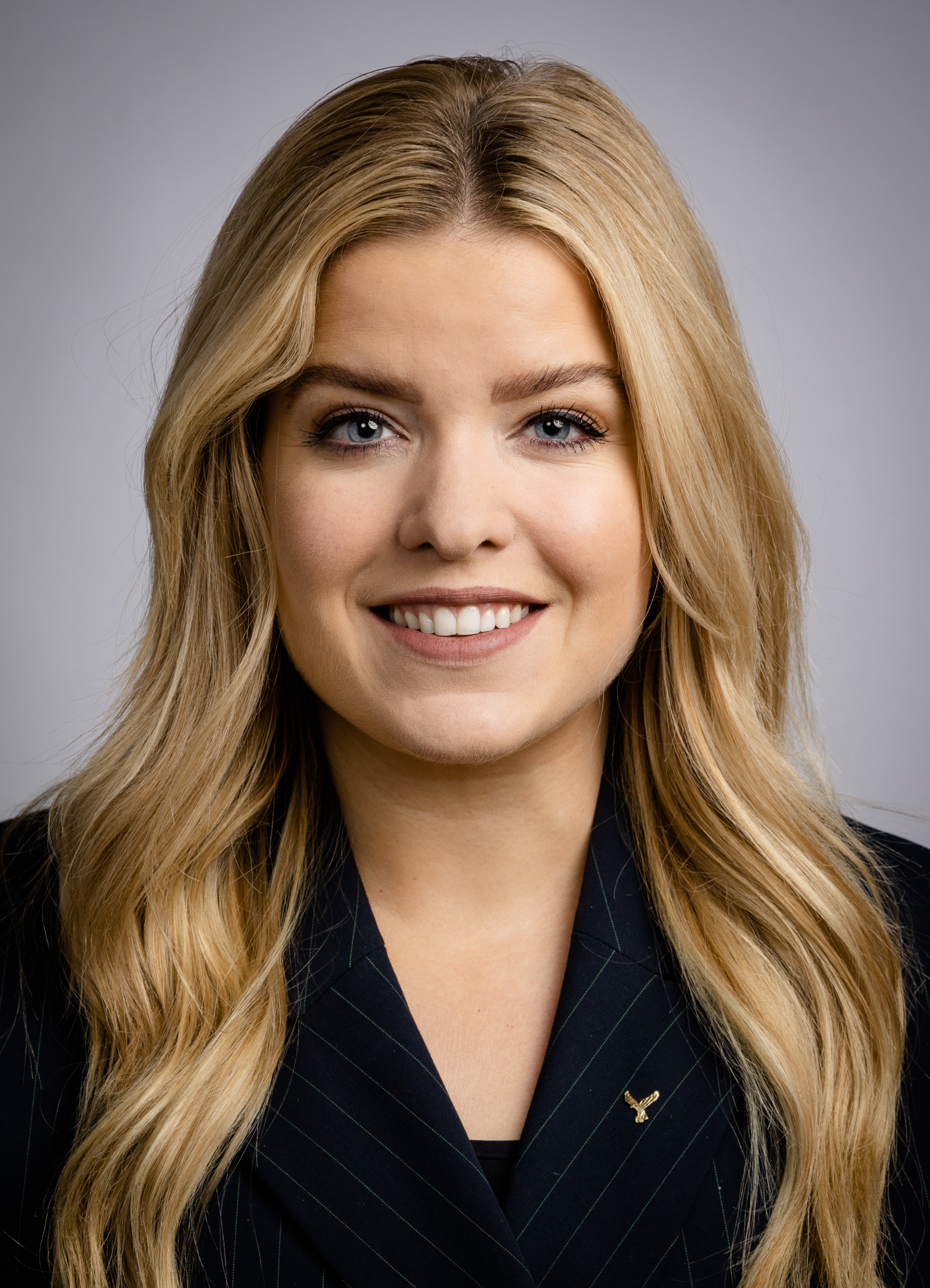

Minister of Higher Education, Science and Innovation
- In office 28 November 2021 – 21 December 2024
- Prime Minister: Katrín Jakobsdóttir; Bjarni Benediktsson
- Preceded by: Þórdís Gylfadóttir
- Succeeded by: Logi Már Einarsson (Culture, Innovation and Universities)

Minister of Justice
- In office 6 September 2019 – 28 November 2021
- Prime Minister: Katrín Jakobsdóttir
- Preceded by: Þórdís Gylfadóttir
- Succeeded by: Jón Gunnarsson

Personal details
- Born: 30 November 1990 (age 35) Reykjavík, Iceland
- Party: Independence
- Parent(s): Sigurbjörn Magnússon (born 1959); Kristín Steinarsdóttir (1959–2012)
- Education: University of Iceland
- Profession: Lawyer

Áslaug Arna Sigurbjörnsdóttir (born 30 November 1990) is an Icelandic lawyer and politician who has been a member of the Althing (Iceland's parliament) for the Reykjavík South constituency since 2016. She also served as the Secretary of the Independence Party from 2015 to 2019. In September 2019, she was named the Minister of Justice. In November 2021, she was named the Minister of Higher Education, Science and Innovation and served until 21 December 2024.

== Education and professional life ==
Áslaug was born in Reykjavík and has lived there all her life. She graduated from the University of Iceland in 2015 with a bachelor degree in law. She received her M.L. in law from the same university in 2017 for a thesis on referendums and their legal impact on democratic governance.

Alongside her studies, Áslaug has worked as a reporter for the newspaper Morgunblaðið and its website mbl.is, a police officer for the police department of the southern region of Iceland, an intern for the law firm Juris, and (briefly) a fisherwoman.

== Political career ==
Áslaug served as chairman of the independence party youth movement in Reykjavík from 2011 to 2013. In October 2015, she ran for the position of secretary of the independence party against, then secretary of the independence party, Guðlaugur Þór Þórðarson, after she declared her interest in the position Guðlaugur decided to step aside. She was elected the new secretary of the Independence Party and received 91.9 percent of the votes cast.

In the 2016 elections, she was elected to parliament for the Reykjavík North constituency and again in the 2017 elections. As of 2017, she served as the deputy chairman of the parliamentary group of the Independence Party. She was the chairman of the Foreign Affairs Committee 2017–2019 and chairman of the Icelandic delegation to the Inter-Parliamentary Union (IPU).

She was named a 2022 Politician of Year by One Young World, receiving her award in Manchester, England in September 2022 alongside four other young politicians from around the world.

On 2 March 2025, she lost the leadership contest of the Independence Party by 19 votes to Guðrún Hafsteinsdóttir.

== Personal life ==
Her mother, Kristín Steinarsdóttir, was a teacher; she died of cancer in 2012. Her father, Sigurbjörn Magnússon, is a Supreme Court attorney. Áslaug has two siblings.

On 20 December 2024, Áslaug was credited with saving the life of a restaurant-goer after using the Heimlich maneuver to dislodge a food stuck in the persons throat.

Party political offices
| Preceded by Guðlaugur Þór Þórðarson | Secretary of the Independence Party; 2015–2019 | Succeeded by Jón Gunnarsson |
Political offices
| Preceded by Þórdís Kolbrún R. Gylfadóttir as Minister of the Interior | Minister of Justice; 2019 – 2021 | Succeeded by Jón Gunnarsson |
| Preceded by Þórdís Kolbrún R. Gylfadóttir as Minister of Industries and Innovation | Minister of Science, Industry and Innovation; 2021 – | Incumbent |
