= Cross of Good Neighbourhood =

Cross of Good Neighbourhood ribbon bar.

Cross of Good Neighbourhood (Belarusian: Крыж добрасуседства, romanized: Kryž dobrasusiedstva, Russian: Крест добрососедства, romanized: Krest dobrososedstva) also known as the Cross of Good Neighborliness is an award of the United Transitional Cabinet of Belarus, a government in exile for Belarus that was formed in August 2022. It was to be awarded to outstanding individuals who significantly help the cause of Belarusians.

== Awardees ==
Recipients include:

- Roberta Metsola
- Stefan Eriksson
- Þórdís Gylfadóttir
- Volodymyr Zelenskyy
- Tobias Billström (6 November 2023)

== See also ==
- Orders, decorations, and medals of Belarus
- Belarusian Democratic Republic 100th Jubilee Medal
