= Reykjavík South (Althing constituency) =

Constituency of the Althing, the national legislature of Iceland

- Reykjavík suður
- Constituency for the Althing
- Location of Reykjavík South within Iceland
- Municipality: Reykjavík
- Region: Capital
- Electorate: 47,619 (2024)

Current Constituency
- Created: 2003
- Seats: 9 (2003–present) (Note: Excludes compensatory seats.)
- Member of the Althing: List: Áslaug Arna Sigurbjörnsdóttir (D); Hildur Sverrisdóttir (D); Inga Sæland (F); Jóhann Páll Jóhannsson (S); Jón Gnarr (C); Jón Pétur Zimsen (D); Kolbrún Baldursdóttir (F); Kristján Þórður Snæbjarnarson (S); Ragna Sigurðardóttir (S); Snorri Másson (M); Þorbjörg Sigríður Gunnlaugsdóttir (C)
- Created from: Reykjavík

Reykjavík South (Icelandic: Reykjavík suður) is one of the six multi-member constituencies of the Althing, the national legislature of Iceland. The constituency was established in 2003 when the existing Reykjavík constituency was split into two. The constituency currently elects nine of the 63 members of the Althing using the open party-list proportional representation electoral system. At the 2024 parliamentary election it had 47,619 registered electors.

== History ==
In March 1843 King Christian VIII of Denmark issued a royal decree converting the Althing into a consultative assembly. It consisted to 20 members popularly elected from single-member constituencies, one of which was Reykjavík. In the subsequent decades the electoral process, size of Althing and constituencies changed several time. Reykjavík became a two-member constituency in 1903 (effective 1904). In 1920 (effective 1923) it became a four-member constituency using proportional representation. It became a six-member constituency in 1934 and an eight-member constituency in 1942.

One of the main reasons for the changes was the shift in population from rural to urban areas, particularly Reykjavík. The changes however always lagged behind population shifts. This resulted in rural constituencies being over-represented in the Althing. The disproportionately in the voting power of rural and urban voters was as high as 10:1 by the mid 20th century. The over-representation of rural constituencies favoured the Progressive Party, whose support base was mostly farmers. The party was over-represented in Althing even after the introduction of compensatory seats (equalisation seas) in 1934.

The constituencies were radically altered in 1959 when the single and two-member constituencies were abolished and replaced by seven multi-member constituencies using proportional representation. The number of seats allocated to Reykjavík was increased from 8 to 12 at the same time. This reduced the disproportionately in the voting power of rural and urban voters to 3:1.

In September 1997 Prime Minister Davíð Oddsson appointed a committee headed by Friðrik Klemenz Sophusson to review the division of constituencies in Iceland and the organisation of elections. The committee's report was published in October 1998 and recommended, amongst other things, that the number of constituencies be reduced and that they be more equal in population size. The Althing passed an amendment to the constitution in June 1999 which removed the reference to specific eight constituencies contained within Article 31 and instead simply stated that there would be six or seven constituencies and that the Althing would determine the boundaries between the constituencies. The amendment also required that if, following an election to Althing, the number of registered electors per seat (including compensatory seats) in any constituency is less than half of that in another constituency, the National Electoral Commission shall change the allocation of seats so as to reduce the imbalance. This reduced the disproportionately in the voting power of rural and urban voters to 2:1.

Reykjavík South was one of six constituencies (kjördæmi) established by the "Elections to the Althing Act no. 24/2000" (Lög um kosningar til Alþingis, nr. 24/2000) passed by the Althing in May 2000. The Act required that, when an election to Althing had been called, the National Electoral Commission had to determine the boundaries between the Reykjavík South and Reykjavík North constituencies so that the number of registered electors per seat (including compensatory seats) is approximately the same. The Act initially allocated eleven seats to the constituency - nine constituency seats and two compensatory seats.

== Electoral system ==
Reykjavík South currently elects nine of the 63 members of the Althing using the open party-list proportional representation electoral system. Constituency seats are allocated using the D'Hondt method. Compensatory seats (equalisation seas) are calculated based on the national vote and are allocated using the D'Hondt method at the constituency level. Only parties that reach the 5% national threshold compete for compensatory seats.

== Election results ==
=== Summary ===
| Election | Left-Green V / U | | | Social Democrats S | | | People's F | | | Pirate P / Þ | | | Viðreisn C | | | Progressive B | | | Independence D | | | Centre M | | |
| Election | Votes | % | Seats | Votes | % | Seats | Votes | % | Seats | Votes | % | Seats | Votes | % | Seats | Votes | % | Seats | Votes | % | Seats | Votes | % | Seats |
|---|---|---|---|---|---|---|---|---|---|---|---|---|---|---|---|---|---|---|---|---|---|---|---|---|
| 2024 | 1,080 | 2.90% | 0 | 8,541 | 22.93% | 3 | 5,022 | 13.48% | 1 | 1,445 | 3.88% | 0 | 6,581 | 17.66% | 2 | 1,638 | 4.40% | 0 | 6,553 | 17.59% | 2 | 3,917 | 10.51% | 1 |
| 2021 | 5,212 | 14.68% | 1 | 4,720 | 13.29% | 1 | 3,169 | 8.93% | 1 | 3,875 | 10.91% | 1 | 3,067 | 8.64% | 1 | 4,077 | 11.48% | 1 | 8,089 | 22.78% | 3 | 1,456 | 4.10% | 0 |
| 2017 | 6,750 | 18.90% | 2 | 4,661 | 13.05% | 1 | 2,914 | 8.16% | 1 | 4,076 | 11.41% | 1 | 3,043 | 8.52% | 1 | 2,897 | 8.11% | 1 | 8,145 | 22.80% | 2 | 2,701 | 7.56% | 0 |
| 2016 | 6,149 | 17.63% | 2 | 1,945 | 5.58% | 0 | 1,614 | 4.63% | 0 | 6,030 | 17.29% | 2 | 4,440 | 12.73% | 1 | 2,564 | 7.35% | 1 | 8,930 | 25.60% | 3 | | | |
| 2013 | 4,279 | 12.12% | 1 | 5,007 | 14.18% | 2 | | | | 2,179 | 6.17% | 0 | | | | 5,931 | 16.80% | 2 | 9,466 | 26.82% | 3 | | | |
| 2009 | 8,106 | 22.88% | 2 | 11,667 | 32.94% | 3 | | | | | | | | | | 3,435 | 9.70% | 1 | 8,211 | 23.18% | 2 | | | |
| 2007 | 5,065 | 14.35% | 1 | 10,234 | 29.00% | 3 | | | | | | | | | | 2,081 | 5.90% | 0 | 13,846 | 39.23% | 5 | | | |
| 2003 | 3,438 | 9.32% | 1 | 12,286 | 33.30% | 3 | | | | | | | | | | 4,185 | 11.34% | 1 | 14,029 | 38.03% | 4 | | | |

(Excludes compensatory seats.)

=== Detailed ===
==== 2020s ====
===== 2024 =====
Results of the 2024 parliamentary election held on 30 November 2024:

| Party | | Votes | % | Seats | | |
| Party | | Votes | % | Con. | Com. | Tot. |
|---|---|---|---|---|---|---|
| Social Democratic Alliance | S | 8,541 | 22.93% | 3 | 0 | 3 |
| Viðreisn | C | 6,581 | 17.66% | 2 | 0 | 2 |
| Independence Party | D | 6,553 | 17.59% | 2 | 1 | 3 |
| People's Party | F | 5,022 | 13.48% | 1 | 1 | 2 |
| Centre Party | M | 3,917 | 10.51% | 1 | 0 | 1 |
| Socialist Party of Iceland | J | 2,091 | 5.61% | 0 | 0 | 0 |
| Progressive Party | B | 1,638 | 4.40% | 0 | 0 | 0 |
| Pirate Party | P | 1,445 | 3.88% | 0 | 0 | 0 |
| Left-Green Movement | V | 1,080 | 2.90% | 0 | 0 | 0 |
| Democratic Party | L | 388 | 1.04% | 0 | 0 | 0 |
| Valid votes | | 37,256 | 100.00% | 9 | 2 | 11 |
| Blank votes | | 337 | 0.89% | | | |
| Rejected votes – other | | 72 | 0.19% | | | |
| Total polled | | 37,665 | 79.10% | | | |
| Registered electors | | 47,619 | | | | |

The following candidates were elected:

- Constituency seats - Áslaug Arna Sigurbjörnsdóttir (D), 6,463.17 votes; Hildur Sverrisdóttir (D), 5,437.67 votes; Inga Sæland (F), 5,017.50 votes; Jóhann Páll Jóhannsson (S), 8,504.67 votes; Jón Gnarr (C), 4,776.25 votes; Kristján Þórður Snæbjarnarson (S), 5,688.17 votes; Ragna Sigurðardóttir (S), 7,120.50 votes; Snorri Másson (M), 3,883.67 votes; and Þorbjörg Sigríður Gunnlaugsdóttir (C), 6,547.50 votes.
- Compensatory seats - Jón Pétur Zimsen (D), 4,382.17 votes; and Kolbrún Baldursdóttir (F), 3,757.75 votes.

===== 2021 =====
Results of the 2021 parliamentary election held on 25 September 2021:

| Party | | Votes | % | Seats | | |
| Party | | Votes | % | Con. | Com. | Tot. |
|---|---|---|---|---|---|---|
| Independence Party | D | 8,089 | 22.78% | 3 | 0 | 3 |
| Left-Green Movement | V | 5,212 | 14.68% | 1 | 1 | 2 |
| Social Democratic Alliance | S | 4,720 | 13.29% | 1 | 0 | 1 |
| Progressive Party | B | 4,077 | 11.48% | 1 | 0 | 1 |
| Pirate Party | P | 3,875 | 10.91% | 1 | 1 | 2 |
| People's Party | F | 3,169 | 8.93% | 1 | 0 | 1 |
| Viðreisn | C | 3,067 | 8.64% | 1 | 0 | 1 |
| Socialist Party of Iceland | J | 1,691 | 4.76% | 0 | 0 | 0 |
| Centre Party | M | 1,456 | 4.10% | 0 | 0 | 0 |
| Liberal Democratic Party | O | 148 | 0.42% | 0 | 0 | 0 |
| Valid votes | | 35,504 | 100.00% | 9 | 2 | 11 |
| Blank votes | | 580 | 1.60% | | | |
| Rejected votes – other | | 117 | 0.32% | | | |
| Total polled | | 36,201 | 79.19% | | | |
| Registered electors | | 45,716 | | | | |

The following candidates were elected:

- Constituency seats - Áslaug Arna Sigurbjörnsdóttir (D), 7,990.50 votes; Birgir Ármannsson (D), 5,391.67 votes; Björn Leví Gunnarsson (P), 3,865.25 votes; Hanna Katrín Friðriksson (C), 3,056.67 votes; Hildur Sverrisdóttir (D), 6,719.17 votes; Inga Sæland (F), 3,168.00 votes; Kristrún Mjöll Frostadóttir (S), 4,714.33 votes; Lilja Dögg Alfreðsdóttir (B), 4,041.00 votes; and Svandís Svavarsdóttir (V), 5,127.50 votes.
- Compensatory seats - Arndís Anna K. Gunnarsdóttir (P), 2,904.25 votes; and Orri Páll Jóhannsson (V), 3,926.50 votes.

==== 2010s ====
===== 2017 =====
Results of the 2017 parliamentary election held on 28 October 2017:

| Party | | Votes | % | Seats | | |
| Party | | Votes | % | Con. | Com. | Tot. |
|---|---|---|---|---|---|---|
| Independence Party | D | 8,145 | 22.80% | 2 | 0 | 2 |
| Left-Green Movement | V | 6,750 | 18.90% | 2 | 0 | 2 |
| Social Democratic Alliance | S | 4,661 | 13.05% | 1 | 0 | 1 |
| Pirate Party | P | 4,076 | 11.41% | 1 | 1 | 2 |
| Viðreisn | C | 3,043 | 8.52% | 1 | 0 | 1 |
| People's Party | F | 2,914 | 8.16% | 1 | 0 | 1 |
| Progressive Party | B | 2,897 | 8.11% | 1 | 0 | 1 |
| Centre Party | M | 2,701 | 7.56% | 0 | 1 | 1 |
| Bright Future | A | 449 | 1.26% | 0 | 0 | 0 |
| People's Front of Iceland | R | 85 | 0.24% | 0 | 0 | 0 |
| Valid votes | | 35,721 | 100.00% | 9 | 2 | 11 |
| Blank votes | | 769 | 2.10% | | | |
| Rejected votes – other | | 108 | 0.30% | | | |
| Total polled | | 36,598 | 80.29% | | | |
| Registered electors | | 45,584 | | | | |

The following candidates were elected:

- Constituency seats - Ágúst Ólafur Ágústsson (S), 4,634.00 votes; Brynjar Níelsson (D), 5,884.75 votes; Hanna Katrín Friðriksson (C), 3,035.67 votes; Inga Sæland (F), 2,912.00 votes; Kolbeinn Óttarsson Proppé (V), 5,056.25 votes; Lilja Dögg Alfreðsdóttir (B), 2,894.33 votes; Sigríður Á. Andersen (D), 7,952.50 votes; Svandís Svavarsdóttir (V), 6,680.75 votes; and Þórhildur Sunna Ævarsdóttir (P), 4,049.25 votes.
- Compensatory seats - Björn Leví Gunnarsson (P), 3,050.75 votes; and Þorsteinn B. Sæmundsson (M), 2,695.33 votes.

===== 2016 =====
Results of the 2016 parliamentary election held on 29 October 2016:

| Party | | Votes | % | Seats | | |
| Party | | Votes | % | Con. | Com. | Tot. |
|---|---|---|---|---|---|---|
| Independence Party | D | 8,930 | 25.60% | 3 | 0 | 3 |
| Left-Green Movement | V | 6,149 | 17.63% | 2 | 0 | 2 |
| Pirate Party | P | 6,030 | 17.29% | 2 | 0 | 2 |
| Viðreisn | C | 4,440 | 12.73% | 1 | 1 | 2 |
| Progressive Party | B | 2,564 | 7.35% | 1 | 0 | 1 |
| Bright Future | A | 2,518 | 7.22% | 0 | 1 | 1 |
| Social Democratic Alliance | S | 1,945 | 5.58% | 0 | 0 | 0 |
| People's Party | F | 1,614 | 4.63% | 0 | 0 | 0 |
| Dawn | T | 578 | 1.66% | 0 | 0 | 0 |
| People's Front of Iceland | R | 79 | 0.23% | 0 | 0 | 0 |
| Humanist Party | H | 33 | 0.09% | 0 | 0 | 0 |
| Valid votes | | 34,880 | 100.00% | 9 | 2 | 11 |
| Blank votes | | 755 | 2.11% | | | |
| Rejected votes – other | | 150 | 0.42% | | | |
| Total polled | | 35,785 | 78.18% | | | |
| Registered electors | | 45,770 | | | | |

The following candidates were elected:

- Constituency seats - Ásta Guðrún Helgadóttir (P), 5,975.25 votes; Brynjar Níelsson (D), 7,399.33 votes; Gunnar Hrafn Jónsson (P), 4,515.50 votes; Hanna Katrín Friðriksson (C), 4,405.25 votes; Kolbeinn Óttarsson Proppé (V), 4,613.00 votes; Lilja Dögg Alfreðsdóttir (B), 2,555.00 votes; Ólöf Nordal (D), 8,823.00 votes; Sigríður Á. Andersen (D), 5,957.67 votes; and Svandís Svavarsdóttir (V), 6,080.75 votes.
- Compensatory seats - Nichole Leigh Mosty (A), 2,497.33 votes; and Pawel Bartoszek (C), 3,322.75 votes.

===== 2013 =====
Results of the 2013 parliamentary election held on 27 April 2013:

| Party | | Votes | % | Seats | | |
| Party | | Votes | % | Con. | Com. | Tot. |
|---|---|---|---|---|---|---|
| Independence Party | D | 9,466 | 26.82% | 3 | 0 | 3 |
| Progressive Party | B | 5,931 | 16.80% | 2 | 0 | 2 |
| Social Democratic Alliance | S | 5,007 | 14.18% | 2 | 0 | 2 |
| Left-Green Movement | V | 4,279 | 12.12% | 1 | 0 | 1 |
| Bright Future | A | 3,790 | 10.74% | 1 | 1 | 2 |
| Pirate Party | Þ | 2,179 | 6.17% | 0 | 1 | 1 |
| Households Party | I | 1,394 | 3.95% | 0 | 0 | 0 |
| Dawn | T | 1,163 | 3.29% | 0 | 0 | 0 |
| Iceland Democratic Party | L | 1,025 | 2.90% | 0 | 0 | 0 |
| Right-Green People's Party | G | 575 | 1.63% | 0 | 0 | 0 |
| Sturla Jónsson | K | 222 | 0.63% | 0 | 0 | 0 |
| Rainbow | J | 161 | 0.46% | 0 | 0 | 0 |
| Humanist Party | H | 55 | 0.16% | 0 | 0 | 0 |
| People's Front of Iceland | R | 54 | 0.15% | 0 | 0 | 0 |
| Valid votes | | 35,301 | 100.00% | 9 | 2 | 11 |
| Blank votes | | 794 | 2.19% | | | |
| Rejected votes – other | | 133 | 0.37% | | | |
| Total polled | | 36,228 | 80.17% | | | |
| Registered electors | | 45,187 | | | | |

The following candidates were elected:

- Constituency seats - Guðlaugur Þór Þórðarson (D), 5,957.7 votes; Hanna Birna Kristjánsdóttir (D), 9,305.8 votes; Helgi Hjörvar (S), 3,729.3 votes; Karl Garðarsson (B), 4,502.3 votes; Pétur Blöndal (D), 7,850.7 votes; Róbert Marshall (A), 3,698.8 votes; Sigríður Ingibjörg Ingadóttir (S), 4,943.0 votes; Svandís Svavarsdóttir (V), 4,225.0 votes; and Vigdís Hauksdóttir (B), 5,701.5 votes.
- Compensatory seats - Jón Þór Ólafsson (Þ), 2,093.3 votes; and Óttarr Proppé (A), 2,838.0 votes.

==== 2000s ====
===== 2009 =====
Results of the 2009 parliamentary election held on 25 April 2009:

| Party | | Votes | % | Seats | | |
| Party | | Votes | % | Con. | Com. | Tot. |
|---|---|---|---|---|---|---|
| Social Democratic Alliance | S | 11,667 | 32.94% | 3 | 1 | 4 |
| Independence Party | D | 8,211 | 23.18% | 2 | 1 | 3 |
| Left-Green Movement | V | 8,106 | 22.88% | 2 | 0 | 2 |
| Progressive Party | B | 3,435 | 9.70% | 1 | 0 | 1 |
| Citizens' Movement | O | 3,076 | 8.68% | 1 | 0 | 1 |
| Liberal Party | F | 700 | 1.98% | 0 | 0 | 0 |
| Democracy Movement | P | 226 | 0.64% | 0 | 0 | 0 |
| Valid votes | | 35,421 | 100.00% | 9 | 2 | 11 |
| Blank votes | | 1,388 | 3.76% | | | |
| Rejected votes – other | | 117 | 0.32% | | | |
| Total polled | | 36,926 | 84.41% | | | |
| Registered electors | | 43,747 | | | | |

The following candidates were elected:

- Constituency seats - Birgitta Jónsdóttir (O), 3,017.7 votes; Guðlaugur Þór Þórðarson (D), 6,269.2 votes; Lilja Mósesdóttir (V), 6,048.0 votes; Ólöf Nordal (D), 6,999.5 votes; Össur Skarphéðinsson (S), 10,363.1 votes; Sigríður Ingibjörg Ingadóttir (S), 10,310.2 votes; Skúli Helgason (S), 8,807.0 votes; Svandís Svavarsdóttir (V), 8,062.2 votes; and Vigdís Hauksdóttir (B), 3,390.7 votes.
- Compensatory seats - Ásta Ragnheiður Jóhannesdóttir (S), 7,136.6 votes; and Birgir Ármannsson (D), 5,489.3 votes.

===== 2007 =====
Results of the 2007 parliamentary election held on 12 May 2007:

| Party | | Votes | % | Seats | | |
| Party | | Votes | % | Con. | Com. | Tot. |
|---|---|---|---|---|---|---|
| Independence Party | D | 13,846 | 39.23% | 5 | 0 | 5 |
| Social Democratic Alliance | S | 10,234 | 29.00% | 3 | 0 | 3 |
| Left-Green Movement | V | 5,065 | 14.35% | 1 | 1 | 2 |
| Liberal Party | F | 2,385 | 6.76% | 0 | 1 | 1 |
| Progressive Party | B | 2,081 | 5.90% | 0 | 0 | 0 |
| Icelandic Movement – Living Country | I | 1,680 | 4.76% | 0 | 0 | 0 |
| Valid votes | | 35,291 | 100.00% | 9 | 2 | 11 |
| Blank votes | | 462 | 1.29% | | | |
| Rejected votes – other | | 93 | 0.26% | | | |
| Total polled | | 35,846 | 82.61% | | | |
| Registered electors | | 43,391 | | | | |

The following candidates were elected:

- Constituency seats - Ágúst Ólafur Ágústsson (S), 8,522.7 votes; Ásta Möller (D), 9,865.7 votes; Ásta Ragnheiður Jóhannesdóttir (S), 6,826.5 votes; Birgir Ármannsson (D), 8,551.3 votes; Björn Bjarnason (D), 10,187.1 votes; Geir Haarde (D), 13,822.4 votes; Illugi Gunnarsson (D), 11,310.3 votes; Ingibjörg Sólrún Gísladóttir (S), 10,090.2 votes; and Kolbrún Halldórsdóttir (V), 4,941.5 votes.
- Compensatory seats - Álfheiður Ingadóttir (V), 3,802.5 votes; and Jón Magnússon (F), 2,341.3 votes.

===== 2003 =====
Results of the 2003 parliamentary election held on 10 May 2003:

| Party | | Votes | % | Seats | | |
| Party | | Votes | % | Con. | Com. | Tot. |
|---|---|---|---|---|---|---|
| Independence Party | D | 14,029 | 38.03% | 4 | 1 | 5 |
| Social Democratic Alliance | S | 12,286 | 33.30% | 3 | 1 | 4 |
| Progressive Party | B | 4,185 | 11.34% | 1 | 0 | 1 |
| Left-Green Movement | U | 3,438 | 9.32% | 1 | 0 | 1 |
| Liberal Party | F | 2,448 | 6.64% | 0 | 0 | 0 |
| New Force | N | 504 | 1.37% | 0 | 0 | 0 |
| Valid votes | | 36,890 | 100.00% | 9 | 2 | 11 |
| Blank votes | | 379 | 1.02% | | | |
| Rejected votes – other | | 58 | 0.16% | | | |
| Total polled | | 37,327 | 87.29% | | | |
| Registered electors | | 42,761 | | | | |

The following candidates were elected:

- Constituency seats - Ásta Ragnheiður Jóhannesdóttir (S), 10,714.8 votes; Geir Haarde (D), 13,999.1 votes; Guðmundur Hallvarðsson (D), 9,839.0 votes; Jóhanna Sigurðardóttir (S), 12,199.1 votes; Jónína Bjartmarz (B), 4,150.7 votes; Mörður Árnason (S), 9,093.1 votes; Ögmundur Jónasson (U), 3,420.3 votes; Pétur Blöndal (D), 12,459.1 votes; and Sólveig Pétursdóttir (D), 10,816.3 votes.
- Compensatory seats - Ágúst Ólafur Ágústsson (S), 7,705.1 votes; and Birgir Ármannsson (D), 8,458.3 votes.
