= Snorri Másson =

Icelandic politician (born 1997)

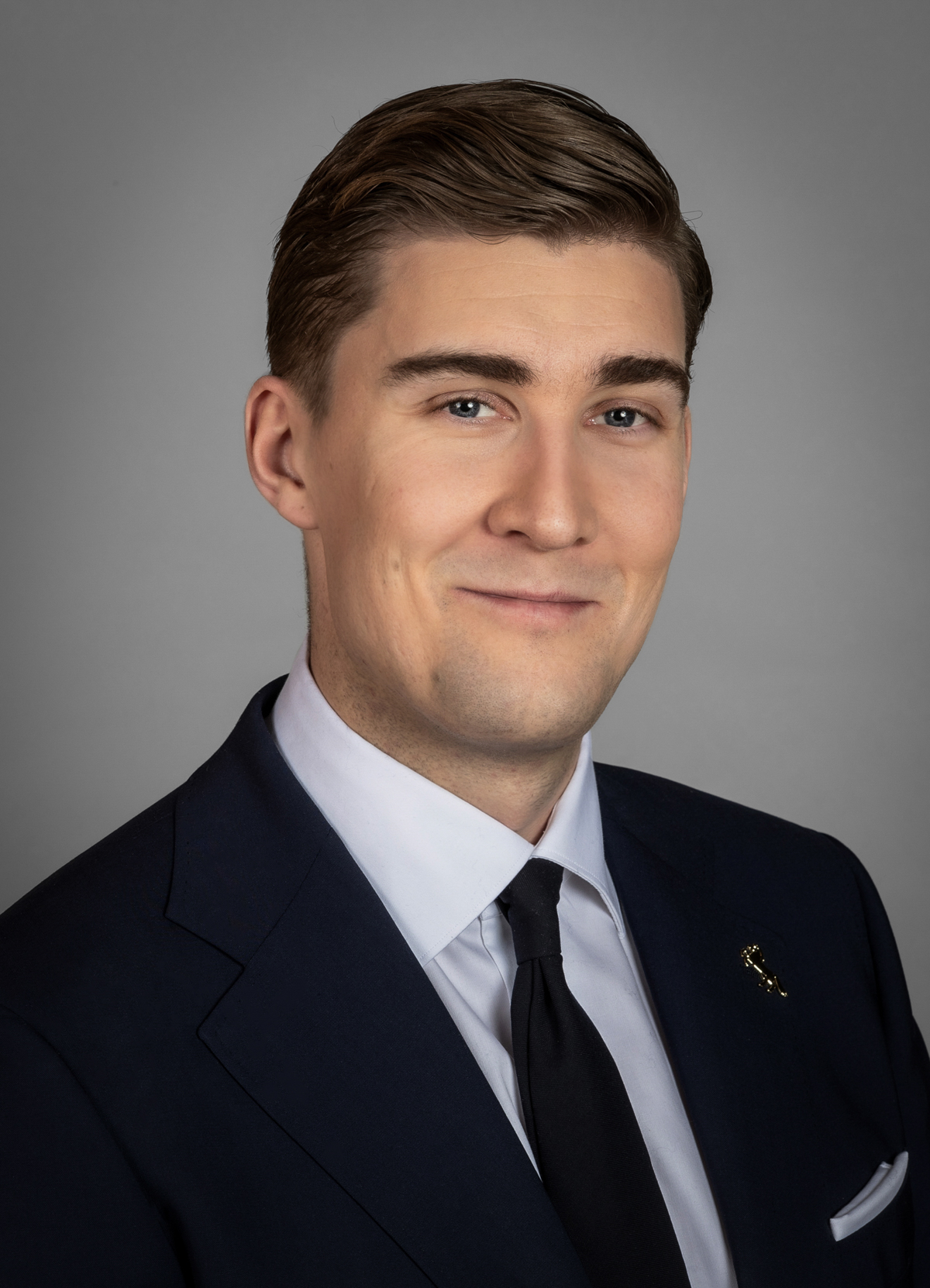

Member of the Althing
- Incumbent
- Assumed office 2024
- Constituency: Reykjavík South

Personal details
- Born: 1 May 1997 (age 29)
- Party: Centre Party (Iceland)

Snorri Másson (born 1 May 1997) is an Icelandic politician from the Centre Party. In the 2024 Icelandic parliamentary election he was elected to the Althing.

== Media career ==
Snorri worked for a time as a journalist at Morgunblaðið but then started working as a reporter at Stöð 2 and has been a podcast host on the podcast Skoðanabræður together with his brother Bergþór Másson, which they started in 2019. He operates a YouTube channel. He also publishes opinion pieces on his blog, Ritstjórinn.

== Politics ==
Snorri decided to run for the Centre Party in Reykjavík in the 2024 Icelandic parliamentary election. He was elected in Reykjavík South constituency.

In September 2025, Snorri appeared on Kastljós in a debate with LGBT rights activist Þorbjörg Þorvaldsdóttir of Samtökin '78. During his appearance he stated his opposition to "gender ideology" and belief that true sex changes were not possible. He reportedly received threats after the episode aired and his home was placed under police protection.

In November 2025, Snorri claimed that demographic replacement of native Icelanders was a "statistical fact".

== Personal life ==
Snorri's parents are Margrét Jónsdóttir Njarðvík, rector of Bifröst University, and Már Jónsson, a historian. His wife is Nadine Guðrún Yaghi.

She has also worked as a journalist and is a podcast host.

== See also ==
- List of members of the Althing, 2024–2028
