= Sigríður Á. Andersen =

Icelandic politician and lawyer

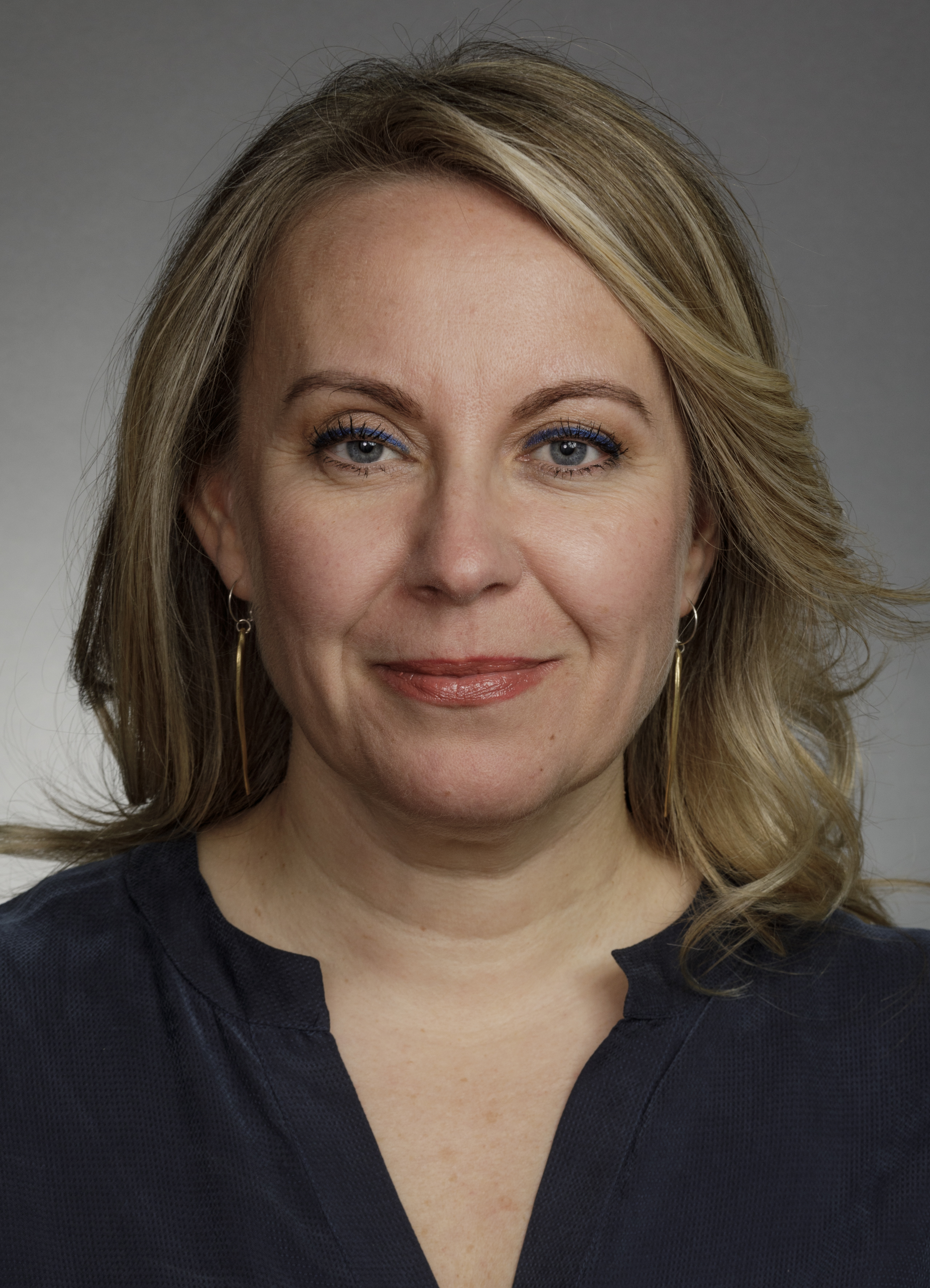
- Official portrait, 2017

Minister of Justice
- In office 11 January 2017 – 14 March 2019
- Prime Minister: Bjarni Benediktsson; Katrín Jakobsdóttir
- Preceded by: Ólöf Nordal (Minister of the Interior)
- Succeeded by: Þórdís Gylfadóttir

Member of the Althing
- Incumbent
- Assumed office 30 November 2024
- Constituency: Reykjavík North
- In office 26 June 2015 – 25 September 2021
- Constituency: Reykjavík South

Personal details
- Born: Sigríður Ásthildur Andersen; 21 November 1971 (age 54) Reykjavík, Iceland
- Party: Centre (2024–present)
- Other political affiliations: Independence (2007–2024)
- Spouse: Glúmur Jón Björnsson
- Education: Menntaskólinn í Reykjavík
- Alma mater: University of Iceland
- Occupation: Lawyer • Politician

Sigríður Ásthildur Andersen (born 21 November 1971) is an Icelandic politician and lawyer who served as the Minister of Justice of Iceland from 2017–2019. She resigned as minister of justice in March 2019 after the European Court of Human Rights found her appointments of judges to the Icelandic court of appeals to be illegal.

She was a member of the Icelandic parliament (Althing) for the Independence Party since 2015. In the 2024 parliamentary elections, she left the Independence Party and ran for the Centre Party.

== Education and career ==
Sigríður graduated from Reykjavik Junior College in 1991, studied law at the University of Iceland, and became an attorney in 2001. From 1999–2005, she worked as a lawyer at the Icelandic Chamber of Commerce, sat on the Council of District Courts from 2004–2009, and then worked at a private law firm from 2007–2015.

She was a deputy member of parliament for the Independence Party for a short while in 2008 and for a few months in 2012–2015. She then became an elected member of parliament in 2015.

== Controversies ==
Sigríður was a controversial figure during her tenure as Justice Minister. She played a pivotal role in the controversy surrounding the 'restored honour' of a convicted child sex offender which led to the dissolution of the Cabinet of Iceland under prime minister Bjarni Benediktsson in 2017.

In 2017, she did not follow the recommendations of a special committee list of the most qualified judges for the newly formed Icelandic court of appeals and instead hand-picked 4 of them, including the wife of fellow Independence Party parliamentarian Brynjar Níelsson. On 12 March 2019, the European Court of Human Rights ruled that the appointments had been made illegally. On 13 March 2019, in the aftermath of the ruling, Sigríður announced that she would resign as Justice Minister.

Political offices
| Preceded by Ólöf Nordal as Minister of the Interior | Minister of Justice; 2017–2019 | Succeeded by Þórdís Kolbrún R. Gylfadóttir |
