= Hanna Katrín Friðriksson =

Icelandic politician and businesswoman (born 1964)

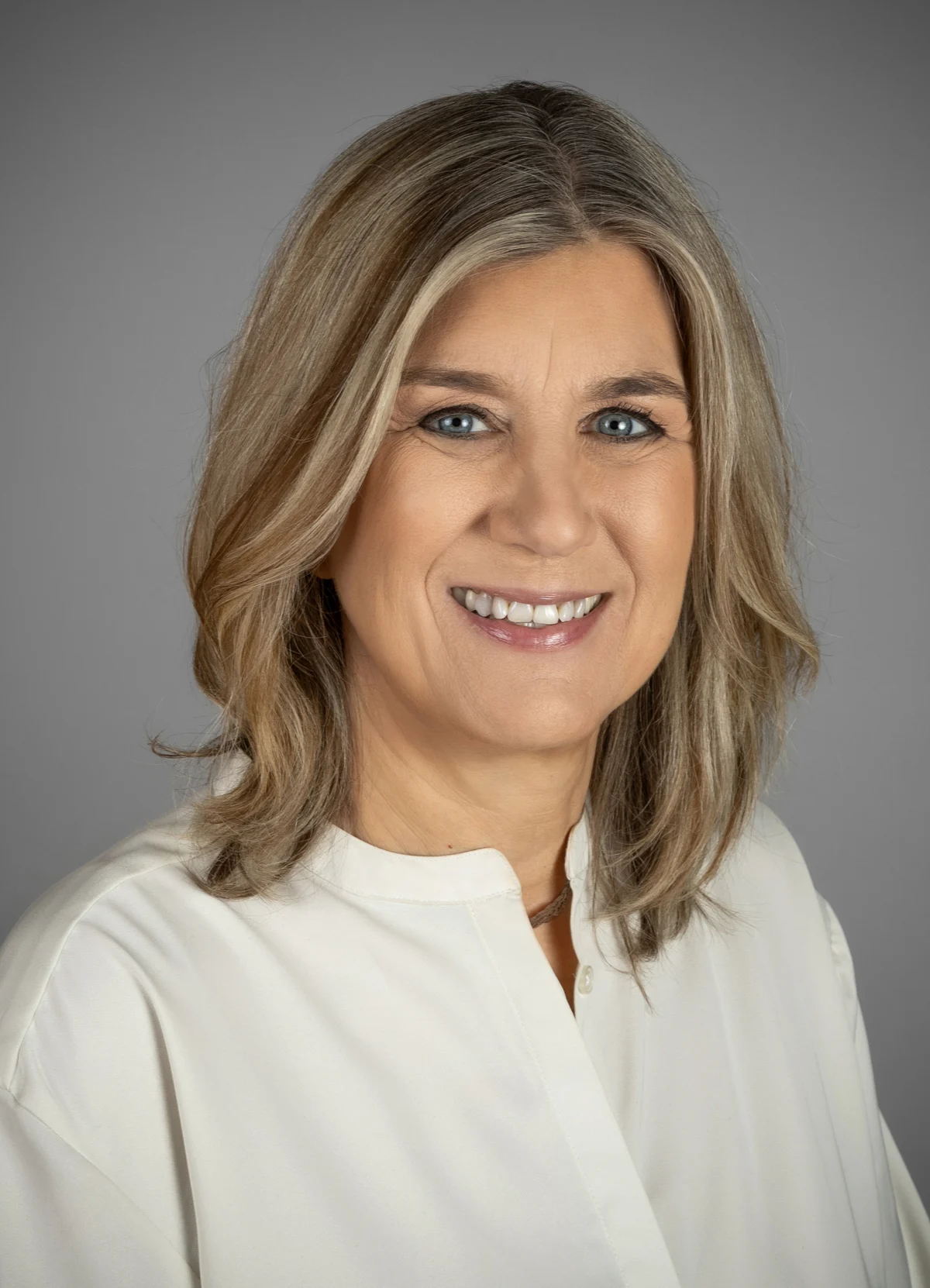
- Official portrait, 2025

Minister of Industries
- Incumbent
- Assumed office 21 December 2024
- Prime Minister: Kristrún Frostadóttir
- Preceded by: Bjarni Benediktsson (Food, Fisheries and Agriculture); Lilja Dögg Alfreðsdóttir (Culture and Business Affairs)

Member of the Althing
- Incumbent
- Assumed office 29 October 2016
- Constituency: Reykjavík South (2016–2024); Reykjavík North (since 2024)

Personal details
- Born: Hanna Katrín Friðriksson; 4 August 1964 (age 62) Paris, France
- Party: Viðreisn
- Spouse: Ragnhildur Sverrisdóttir
- Children: 2
- Education: Menntaskólinn í Reykjavík
- Alma mater: University of Iceland; University of California, Davis
- Occupation: Journalist • Politician

Hanna Katrín Friðriksson (born 4 August 1964) is an Icelandic politician and businesswoman and a former national handball player. Hanna Katrín was elected to Althing for Viðreisn in Reykjavík South in 2016. She played handball for many years and became a four-time cup champion as well as playing 34 national matches on behalf of Iceland.

== Family ==
She was born in Paris, France and her parents are Torben Friðriksson (1934–2012), a government accountant, and Margrét Björg Þorsteinsdóttir (1930–2016), a teacher. Her spouse is Ragnhildur Sverrisdóttir and they have twin daughters born in 2001.

== Education ==
She graduated from Reykjavík High School in 1985, and holds a BA in philosophy and economics from the University of Iceland in 1999, and an MBA from the University of California Davis in 2001.

== Career ==
She was a journalist at Morgunblaðin from 1990 to 1999, director of Reykjavík University's Management School from 2001 to 2003. Director of Reykjavík University from 2003 to 2005 and director of Eimskip's communications department from 2005 to 2006. She was an assistant to Guðlaugur Þór Þórðarson, Minister of Health from 2007 to 2009 and a part-time teacher at the University of Bifröst 2009–2011. In the years 2010–2016, she worked at Icepharma as director of business development from 2010 to 2012 and manager of the health department from 2012 to 2016. Since 2016, she has been Viðreisn's member of parliament in the Reykjavík South constituency.

She has sat in various committees and councils, for example as chairman of the committee of the Ministry of Education, ÍSÍ and UMFÍ on strategic planning in girls' and women's sports from 1996 to 1997, chairman of the committee of the Ministry of Education and the Office of Equality for Women and the Media in 1998-1999 and in the working group of the Ministry of Education on shaping sports policy from 2005 to 2006. She was a member of the committee organized by the Minister of Education on the law on public universities in 2007–2008, on the board of Independent Europeans from 2010, was on the board of MP bank from 2011 to 2014 and has been on the board of Hlíðarenda ses. from 2013 and in the Parliamentary Committee since 2017.

== Sports career ==
Hanna Katrín started playing handball at a young age with ÍR and became cup champion with the club during the 1982-1983 season. Due to the club having difficulties, the team disbanded a year later and Hanna Katrín joined Valur where she again became cup champion in 1988 and 1993. In 1994 she joined Fram where she won her fourth cup championship in February 1995. After a year in Fram's camp, she retired from playing competitive handball.
