= Brynjar Níelsson =

Icelandic politician

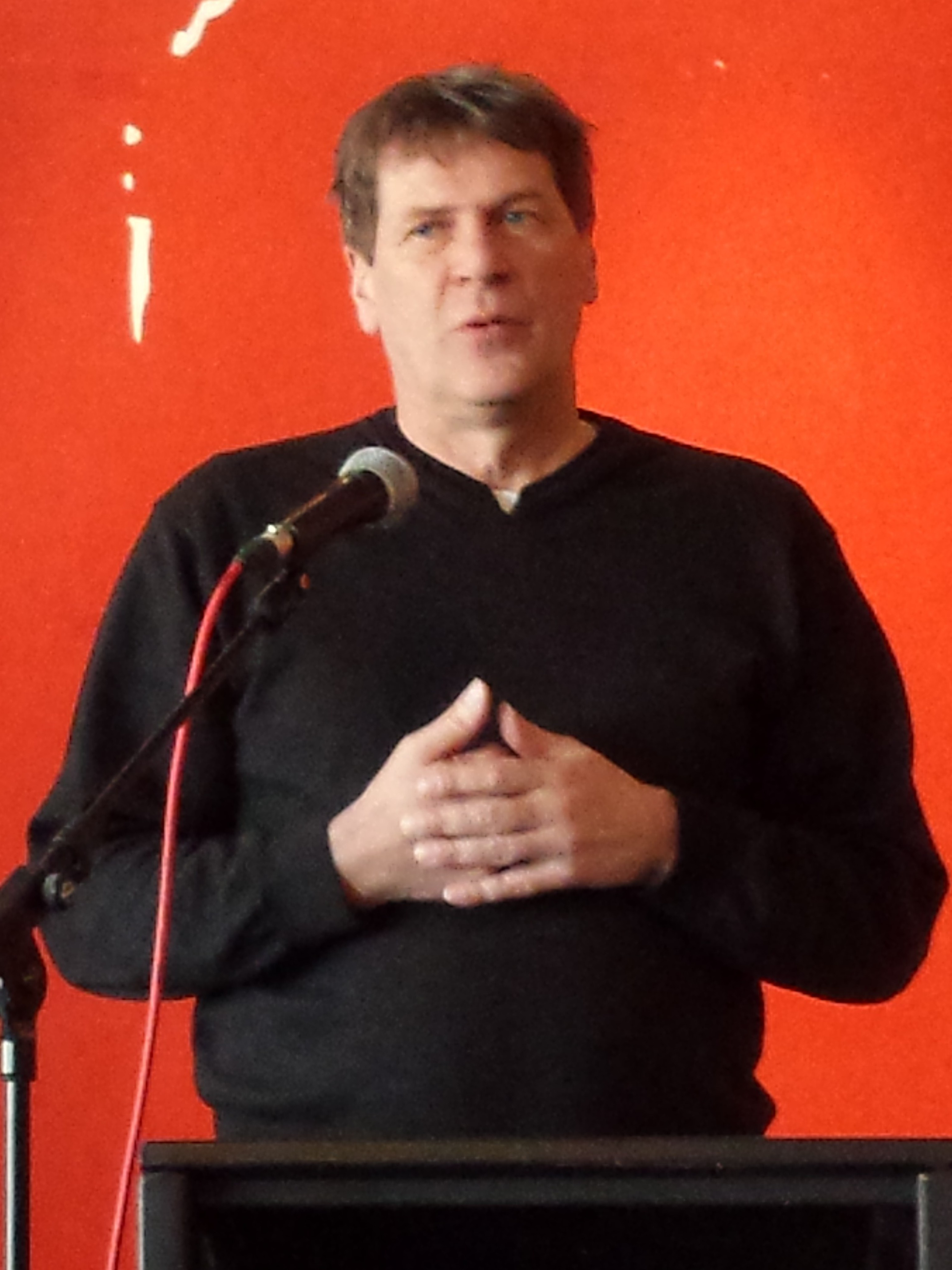

Member of the Althing
- In office 2013–2021

Personal details
- Born: 1 September 1960 (age 66) Reykjavík, Iceland
- Party: Independence Party
- Spouse(s): Arnfríður Einarsdóttir (born 1960)
- Parent(s): Níels Helgi Jónsson (1921—2005); Dóra Unnur Guðlaugsdóttir (1925-2017)
- Education: University of Iceland
- Profession: Lawyer

Brynjar Níelsson (born 1 September 1960) is an Icelandic politician who was a member of the Althing (Iceland's parliament) for the Reykjavík North constituency from 2013 to 2016 and the Reykjavík South constituency from 2016 to 2021, representing for the Independence Party.
