= Guðrún Hafsteinsdóttir =

Icelandic politician (born 1970)

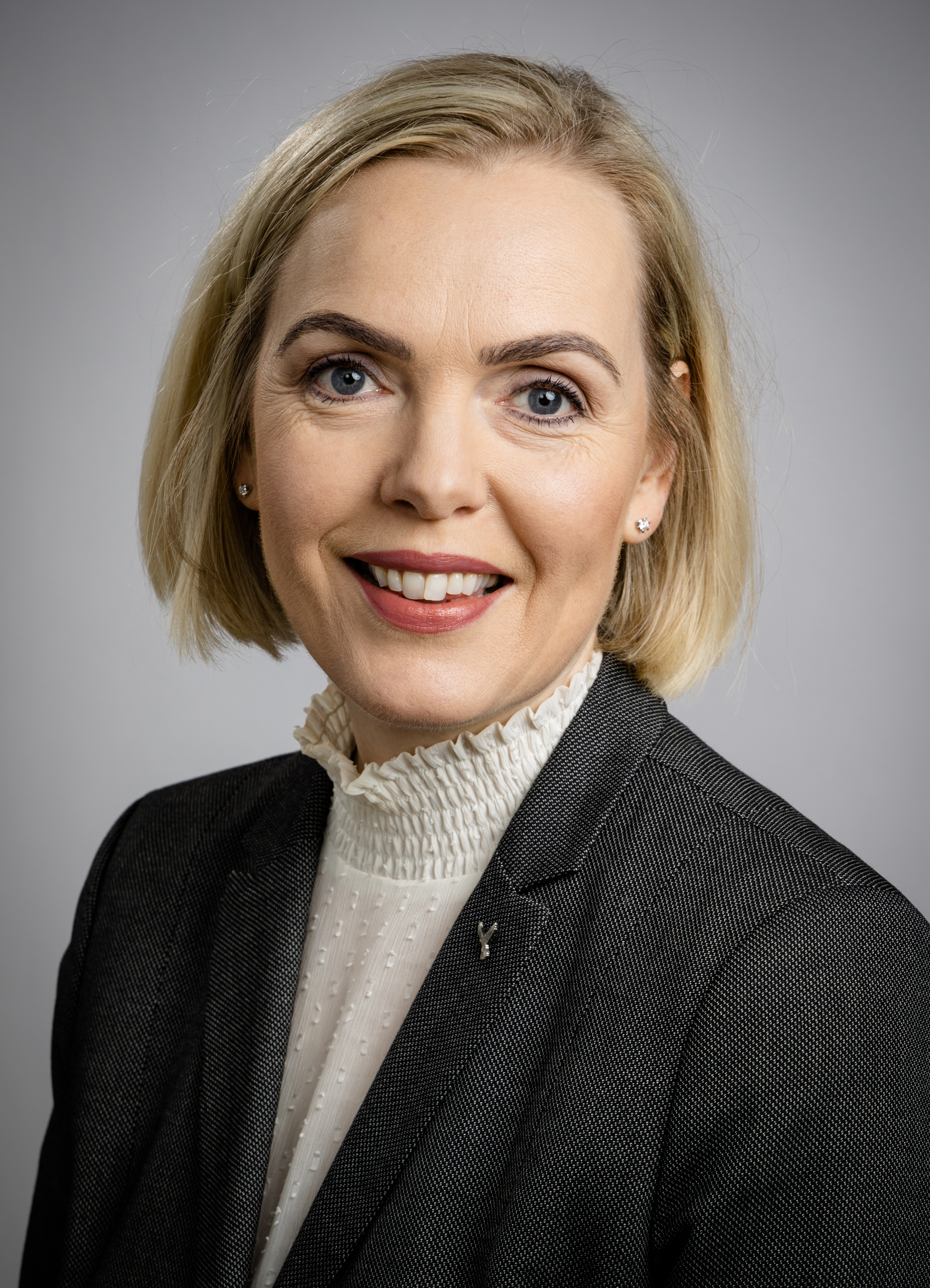

Minister of Justice
- In office 19 June 2023 – 21 December 2024
- Prime Minister: Katrín Jakobsdóttir; Bjarni Benediktsson
- Preceded by: Jón Gunnarsson
- Succeeded by: Þorbjörg Sigríður Gunnlaugsdóttir

Leader of the Independence Party
- Incumbent
- Assumed office 2 March 2025
- Deputy: Jens Garðar Helgason
- Preceded by: Bjarni Benediktsson

Personal details
- Born: 9 February 1970 (age 56) Selfoss, Iceland
- Party: Independence Party
- Parent(s): Hafsteinn Kristinsson (1933–1993); Laufey S. Valdimarsdóttir (1940)
- Education: University of Iceland

Guðrún Hafsteinsdóttir (born 9 February 1970) is an Icelandic politician and business leader. With a BA in anthropology and a diploma in Applied Gender Studies, she has held significant roles in her family's company, Kjörís ehf. Since 2021, she has been serving as a Member of Althing, the national parliament, for the South Constituency representing the Independence Party. From June 2023 to December 2024, she was also the Minister of Justice. In March 2025, she was elected chair of the Independence Party as successor of Bjarni Benediktsson.

== Early life, education, and personal life ==
Guðrún Hafsteinsdóttir was born on February 9, 1970, in Selfoss, Iceland, to Hafsteinn Kristinsson, a pioneering dairy engineer, and Laufey S. Valdimarsdóttir, a homemaker. She completed her student degree from FSu in 1991 and later earned a BA in anthropology in 2008 and a diploma in Applied Gender Studies in 2011, both from the University of Iceland. Guðrún has been married twice, first to Davíð Jóhann Davíðsson, with whom she has three children: Hafsteinn, Dagný Lísa, and Haukur. She later married Hans Kristján Einarsson Hagerup and became a stepmother to his three sons.

== Business and political career ==
Guðrún's career in the business sector primarily involved working in her family's company, Kjörís ehf., where she served as Marketing Manager, managing director, and Financial Manager at different times. She also held board positions in various organizations, including Steingerðis ehf. and the Confederation of Icelandic Enterprise. Guðrún entered politics as a Member of Parliament for the South Constituency representing the Independence Party in 2021. She chaired important committees and was appointed the Minister of Justice in 2023.

On 8 February 2025, she announced that she will be running to be chair of the Independence Party. She was formally elected at the party congress in early March, winning against Áslaug Arna Sigurbjörnsdóttir by 19 votes and 50.1% of the vote.

Party political offices
Preceded by Bjarni Benediktsson	Leader of the Independence Party; 2025–present	Incumbent
Political offices
Preceded by Jón Gunnarsson	Minister of Justice; 2023–2024	Succeeded by Þorbjörg Sigríður Gunnlaugsdóttir
