= Þorbjörg Sigríður Gunnlaugsdóttir =

Icelandic politician (born 1978)

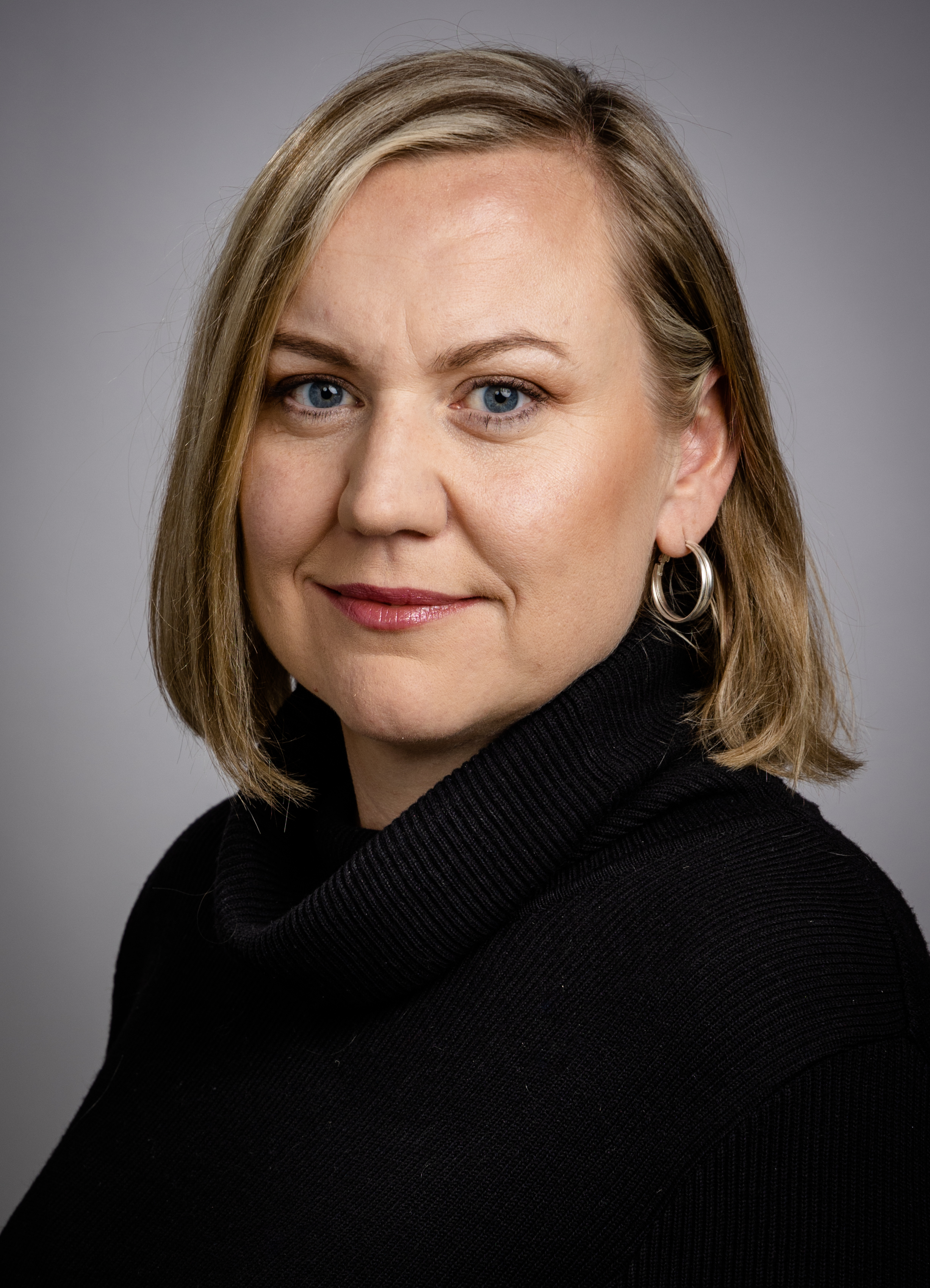
- Official portrait, 2021

Minister of Justice
- Incumbent
- Assumed office 21 December 2024
- Prime Minister: Kristrún Frostadóttir
- Preceded by: Guðrún Hafsteinsdóttir

Member of the Althing
- Incumbent
- Assumed office 14 April 2020
- Constituency: Reykjavík North (2020–2024); Reykjavík South (since 2024)

Personal details
- Born: Þorbjörg Sigríður Gunnlaugsdóttir; 23 May 1978 (age 48) Reykjavík, Iceland
- Party: Viðreisn
- Spouse: Ágúst Ólafur Ágústsson (divorced)
- Children: 3
- Education: University of Iceland; Columbia University
- Occupation: Lawyer • Politician

Þorbjörg Sigríður Gunnlaugsdóttir (born 23 May 1978) is an Icelandic politician serving as minister of justice since 2024. She has been a member of the Althing since 2020.
