= Kristján Þórður Snæbjarnarson =

Icelandic politician (born 1980)

Kristján Þórður Snæbjarnarson (KÞS)
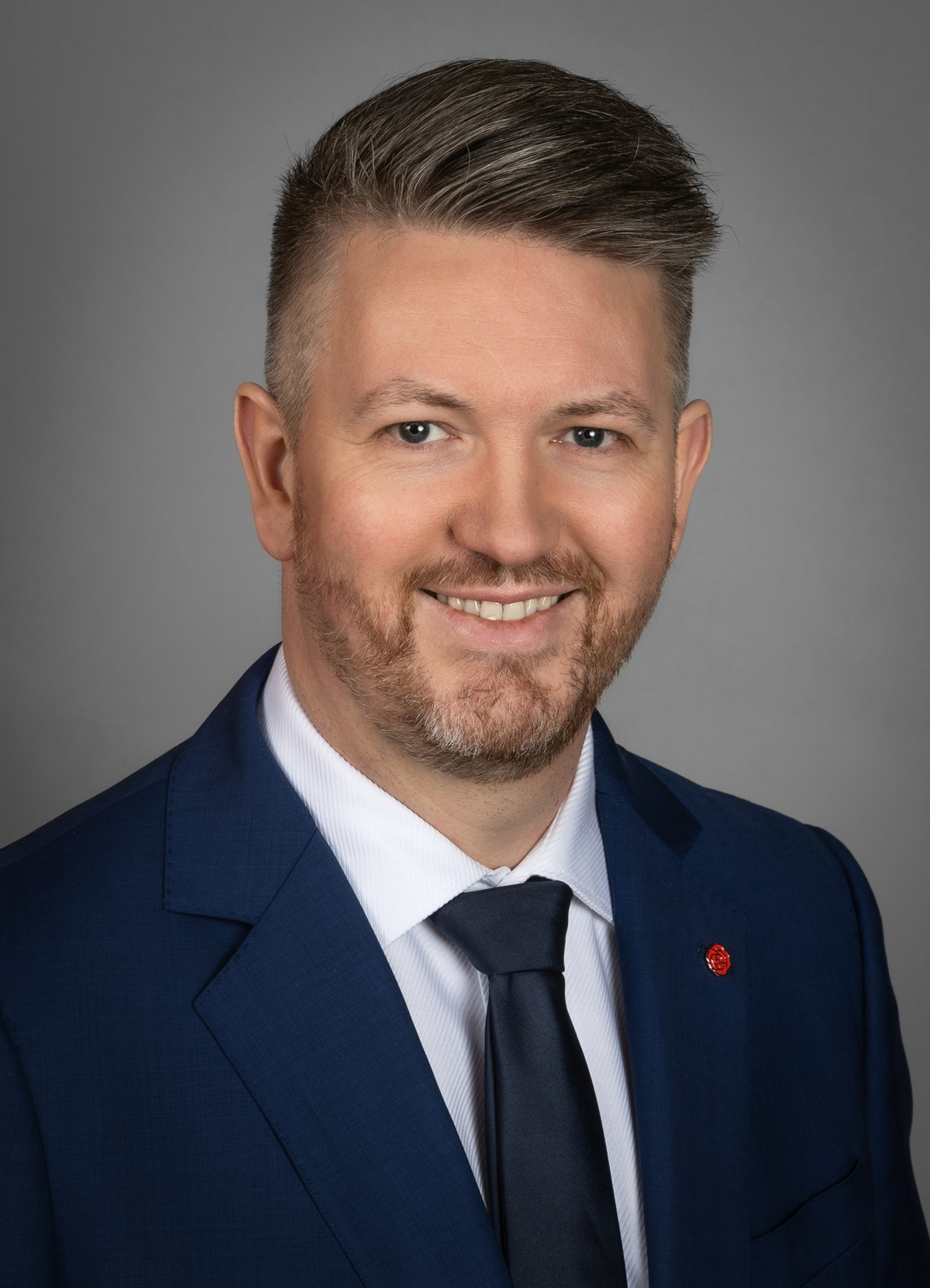

Member of the Althing
- Incumbent
- Assumed office 30 November 2024
- Constituency: Reykjavík South

Personal details
- Born: 21 October 1980 (age 45); Keflavík, Iceland
- Party: Social Democratic Alliance
- Education: Reykjavík University

Kristján Þórður Snæbjarnarson (born 21 October 1980) is an Icelandic trade unionist, politician and member of the Althing. A member of the Social Democratic Alliance, he has represented the Reykjavík South constituency since November 2024.

Kristján was born on 21 October 1980 in Keflavík. He is the son of electrical engineer Snæbjörn Kristjánsson and office representative Sigurlaug Sigurðardóttir. He spent the first six years of his life in Lyngholt, Barðaströnd before the family moved to Reykjavík in 1986. They lived in the Breiðholt district until 1993. He studied electronic engineering at Iðnskólinn í Reykjavík. He also studied electrical engineering (2008) and business administration (2010) at Reykjavík University. He worked for many years as an electronic technician at the ISAL smelter in Straumsvík.

Kristján became involved in trade unionism in 2004 and took part in the pay negotiation at ISAL. He was elected chairman of the Association of Electronic Engineers (Félags rafeindavirkja) in 2008. He has been chairman of the Electrical Industry Association of Iceland (RSÍ) since 2011. He was elected second vice-president of the Icelandic Confederation of Labour (ASI) in 2018 and first vice-president in 2020. He was elected to the Althing at the 2024 parliamentary election.

Kristján married to Díana Lynn Simpson in 2002 and has two daughters and a son.
