= Ögmundur Jónasson =

Icelandic politician

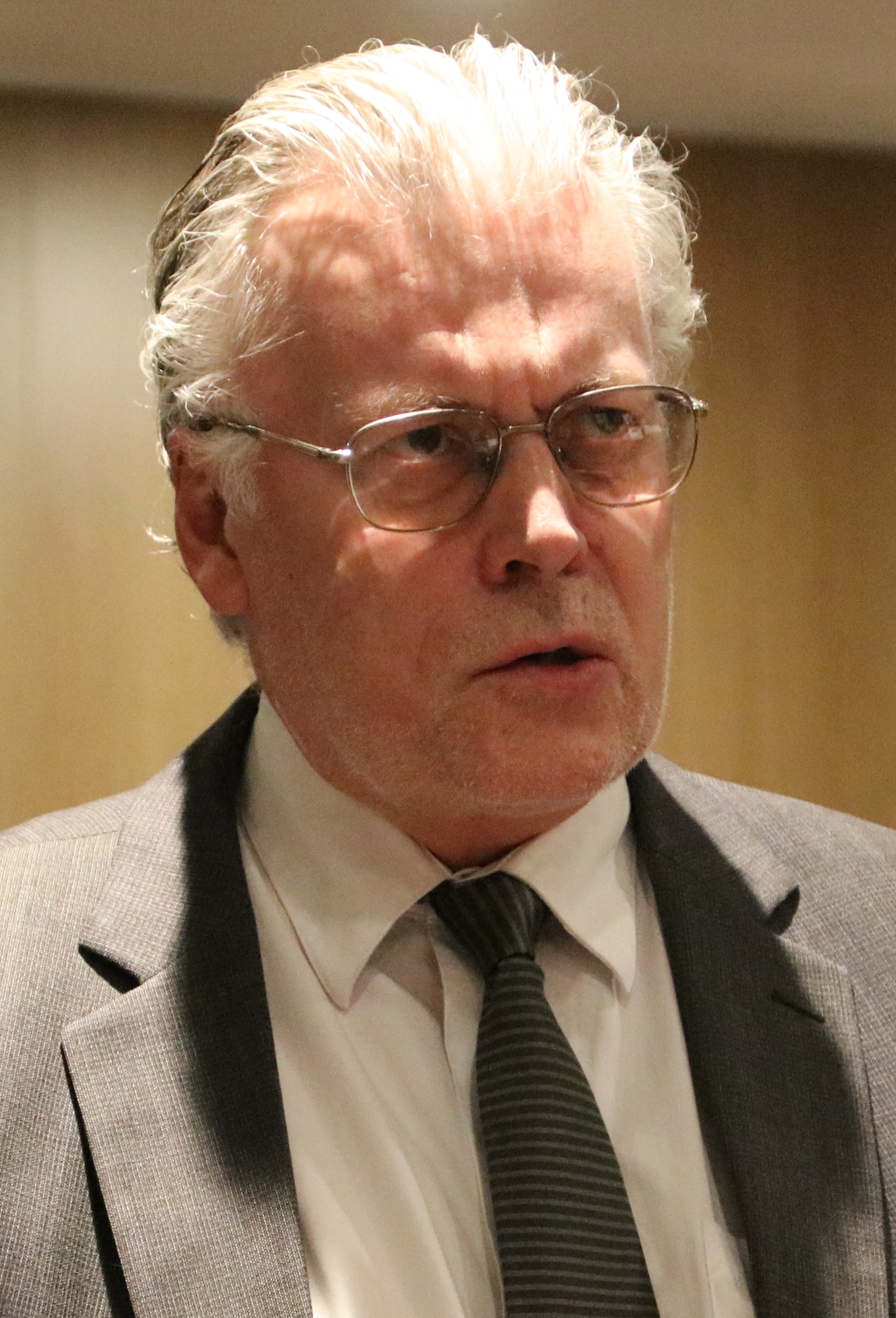
- Ögmundur Jónasson in November 2016.

Minister of the Interior
- In office 1 January 2011 – 23 May 2013
- Prime Minister: Jóhanna Sigurðardóttir
- Preceded by: Office created
- Succeeded by: Hanna Birna Kristjánsdóttir

Minister of Justice
- In office 2 September 2010 – 31 December 2010
- Prime Minister: Jóhanna Sigurðardóttir
- Preceded by: Ragna Árnadóttir
- Succeeded by: Position temporarily put under ministry of interior

Minister of Health
- In office 1 February 2009 – 30 September 2009
- Prime Minister: Jóhanna Sigurðardóttir
- Preceded by: Guðlaugur Þór Þórðarson
- Succeeded by: Álfheiður Ingadóttir

Personal details
- Born: 17 July 1948 (age 78) Reykjavík, Iceland
- Party: Left-Green Movement (1999-2016)
- Spouse: Valgerður Andrésdóttir (m. 1974)
- Children: Three children (b. 1974, 1979, 1981)
- Education: University of Edinburgh

Ögmundur Jónasson (born 17 July 1948) is an Icelandic politician who served as a member of Althingi, the Icelandic Parliament, from 1995 to 2016. He is the former Minister of the Interior (2011-2013); Minister of Justice and human rights and minister of transport, communications and local government (2010); and Minister of Health and social security (2009).

== Early life and education ==
Ögmundur was born in Reykjavík. He is born to father Jónas B. Jónsson, an education director, and mother Guðrún Ö. Stephensen, a housewife.

Ögmundur graduated from Menntaskólinn í Reykjavík in 1969 and from the University of Edinburgh in 1974 with a MA in history and political science.

== Early career ==
Apart from his political career, Ögmundur has been a journalist and a trade union leader, researcher, and part-time lecturer including at the University of Iceland. He has been active in various grass-root activities, a prolific commentator and public speaker. He was a radio broadcaster and TV reporter at RÚV, the Icelandic Public Broadcasting Service (1978-1988), and the Chairman of BSRB, the Confederation of State and Municipal Employees of Iceland (1988-2009). He has served on several international trade union boards, such as the European Trade Union Confederation (ETUC), the European Federation of Public Service Unions (EPSU), Public Services International (PSI), the Council of Nordic Trade Unions (NFS) and the Council of Nordic Municipal Employees (NTR).

== Political career ==
When Ögmundur entered Parliament in 1995 for the now defunct Reykjavík constituency, he first represented the People's Alliance and Non-Aligned. Later he partook in the foundation of the Left-Green Movement and served as its Chairperson of the Parliamentary group from 1999-2009.

Ögmundur became Iceland's Minister of Health in February 2009, but resigned at the end of September in connection with the Icesave dispute. He returned to the government in September 2010 and from January 2011 he headed the newly created Ministry of the Interior and stayed as minister until a new government came to power in 2013.

== Personal life ==
=== Family ===
Ögmundur is married to Valgerður Andrésdóttir, a geneticist, with whom he has three children.

=== Political Beliefs ===
Ögmundur has been outspoken on foreign policy issues. He is critical of Iceland's NATO membership and a strong supporter of human rights and national minority rights. He is also a supporter of the Campaign for the Establishment of a United Nations Parliamentary Assembly, an organisation which campaigns for democratic reformation of the United Nations. He has gained international attention in connection with three issues. First, he proposed measures designed to protect children from the harms of violent pornography as part of his broader support for human rights and women’s rights. It was a step criticized by some free speech activists, but welcomed by human rights advocates and feminists. Second, his decision in 2011 to reject a plan by a Chinese business tycoon, Mr. Huang Nubo, to purchase a huge tract of land in the North East of Iceland attracted much geopolitical and media attention. It raised suspicions that the plan was part of Chinese efforts to gain a strategic foothold in Iceland. Third, Ögmundur Jónasson refused all cooperation with FBI agents who had come to Iceland in 2011 to question Sigurdur Thordarson—on the pretext of investigating an impending hacking attack on Icelandic government computers—and directed them to leave the country because he believed that they were, in fact, engaged in a broader swoop to gather intelligence on WikiLeaks and in trying to frame its founder Julian Assange.

Political offices
Preceded by Guðlaugur Þór Þórðarson	Minister of Health; February – September 2009	Succeeded by Álfheiður Ingadóttir
