= Kolbrún Baldursdóttir =

Icelandic politician (born 1959)

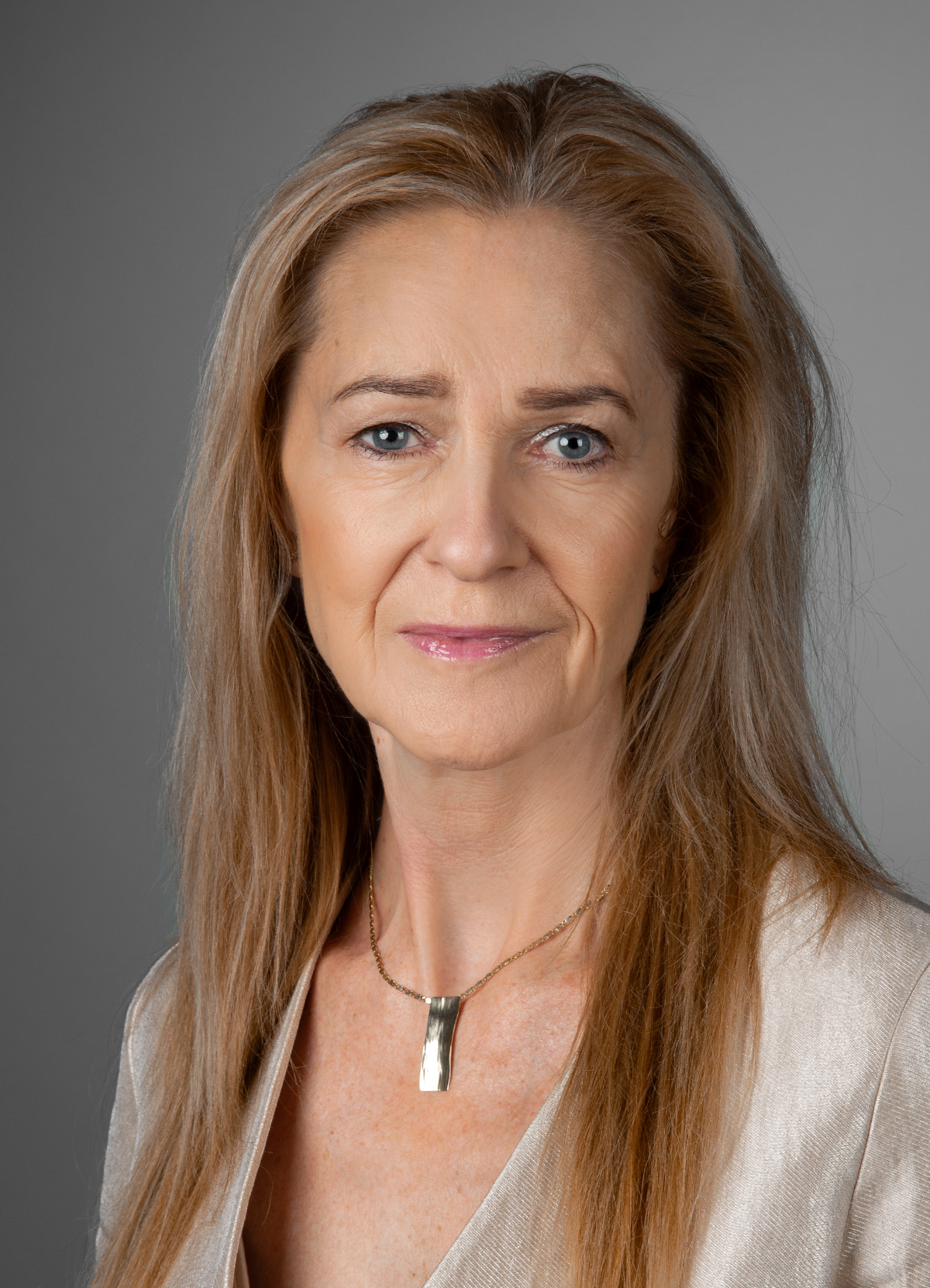

Member of the Althing
- Incumbent
- Assumed office 2024
- Constituency: Reykjavík South

Personal details
- Born: 23 March 1959 (age 67)
- Party: People's Party
- Website: kolbrunbaldurs.is

Kolbrún Baldursdóttir (born 23 March 1959) is an Icelandic politician from the People's Party. In the 2024 Icelandic parliamentary election she was elected to the Althing.

== See also ==
- List of members of the Althing, 2024–2028
