= Jóhann Páll Jóhannsson =

Icelandic politician (born 1992)

Jóhann Páll Jóhannsson (JPJ)
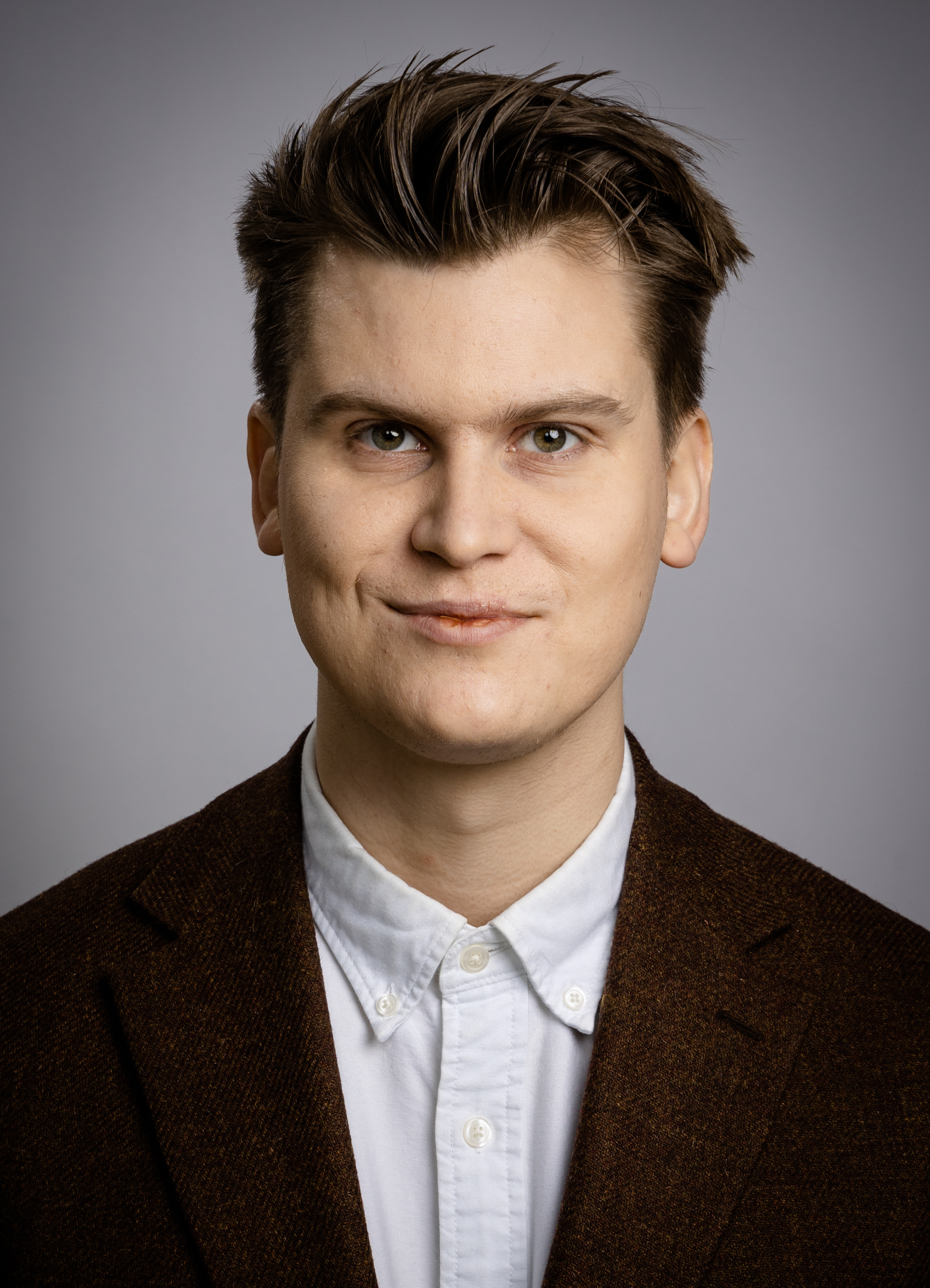
- Jóhann in 2021

Minister of Environment, Energy and Climate
- Incumbent
- Assumed office 21 December 2024
- Prime Minister: Kristrún Frostadóttir
- Preceded by: Guðlaugur Þór Þórðarson

Member of the Althing
- Incumbent
- Assumed office 30 November 2024
- Constituency: Reykjavík South
- In office 25 September 2021 – 29 November 2024
- Constituency: Reykjavík North

Personal details
- Born: 31 May 1992 (age 34) Reykjavík, Iceland
- Party: Social Democratic Alliance
- Education: University of Iceland; University of Edinburgh; London School of Economics
- Profession: Journalist

Jóhann Páll Jóhannsson (born 31 May 1992) is an Icelandic politician, government minister and member of the Althing. A member of the Social Democratic Alliance, he has represented Reykjavík South since November 2024. He previously represented Reykjavík North from September 2021 to November 2024. He has been Minister of Environment, Energy and Climate since December 2024.

== Early life ==
Jóhann was born on 31 May 1992 in Reykjavík. He is the son of composer Jóhann G. Jóhannsson and violinist Bryndís Pálsdóttir. He grew up in the Laugarás neighbourhood of Reykjavík. He wanted to be a musician and studied the piano for ten years but had difficulty reading music. At the age of 12 he wrote a song titled Hvar er Guðmundur? which became a hit on the Internet and on radio. He performed at concerts, singing his own songs and playing the guitar. He was religious as a child but this stopped after he read the entire Bible.

Jóhann graduated from Reykjavík High School (MR) in 2012. He received a Bachelor of Arts degree in philosophy, minoring in law, from the University of Iceland (HÍ) in 2015. He has Master of Science degrees in history from the University of Edinburgh (2017) and in European political economy from the London School of Economics (2020).

== Career ==
Jóhann was a journalist at the DV (2012-2015) but resigned in January 2015 citing editorial interference by new owner Björn Ingi Hrafnsson who had links to the right wing Progressive Party. He worked for Stundin, which had been founded by former journalists from DV, from 2015 to 2019. He has won awards for his journalistic work including on Lekamálið (2014), sex offenders (2017) and Bjarni Benediktsson's involvement in the collapsed Glitnir bank (2018).

Jóhann quit journalism after returning to Iceland from studying in the UK and entered politics, joining the Social Democratic Alliance (Samfylkingin) in 2020. He worked as an advisor to the party's parliamentary group. He was elected to the Althing at the 2021 parliamentary election. He was re-elected at the 2024 parliamentary election. Following the election Samfylkingin formed a coalition government with Viðreisn and the People's Party. Jóhann was appointed Minister of Environment, Energy and Climate by Prime Minister Kristrún Frostadóttir on 21 December 2024.

== Personal life ==
Jóhann is married to chemist Anna Bergljót Gunnarsdóttir. Their daughter was born in January 2023.

== Electoral history ==
Electoral history of Jóhann Páll Jóhannsson
Election	Constituency	Party	Votes	Result
2021 parliamentary	Reykjavík North	Social Democratic Alliance	3,323.00	Elected
2024 parliamentary	Reykjavík South	Social Democratic Alliance	8,504.67	Elected
