= Ragna Sigurðardóttir (politician) =

Icelandic politician (born 1992)

Ragna Sigurðardóttir (RagnaS)
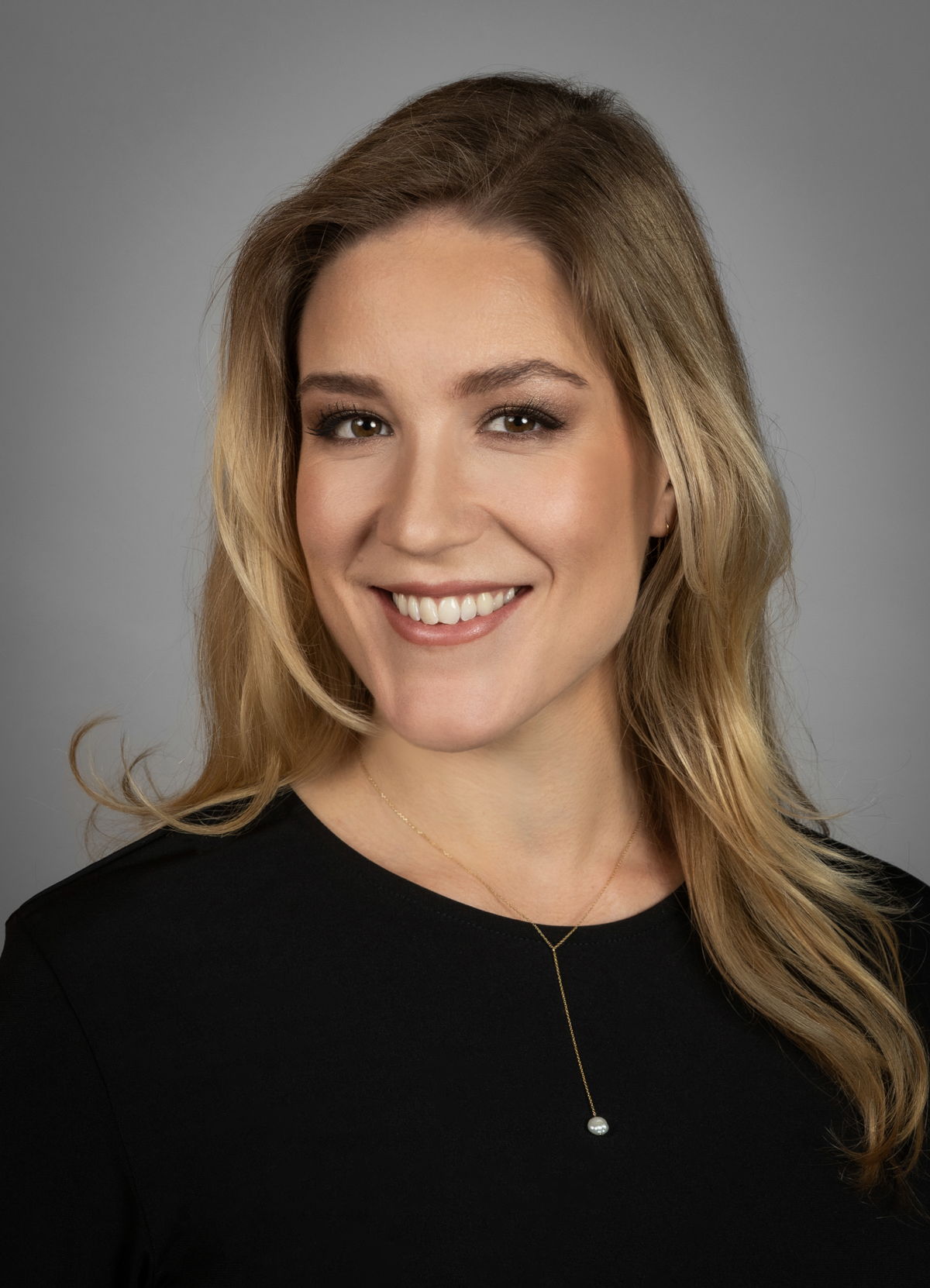

Member of the Althing
- Incumbent
- Assumed office 30 November 2024
- Constituency: Reykjavík South

Personal details
- Born: 31 August 1992 (age 34) Reykjavík, Iceland
- Citizenship: Icelandic; American
- Party: Social Democratic Alliance
- Education: University of Iceland
- Profession: Physician

Ragna Sigurðardóttir (born 31 August 1992) is an Icelandic politician and member of the Althing. A member of the Social Democratic Alliance, she has represented the Reykjavík South constituency since November 2024.

Ragna was born on 31 August 1992 in Reykjavík. She is the daughter of physician Sigurður Einarsson. At the age of six she and her family migrated to Madison, Wisconsin, where her father was a resident gastroenterologist. The family regularly returned to Iceland for vacations. She studied at Madison West High School from 2006 to 2007 and obtained American citizenship. The family moved back to Iceland in 2008, a move that Ragna was not happy with. She studied at Kársnesskóli in Kópavogur and Menntaskólinn við Hamrahlíð from where she matriculated cum laude (2012).

Ragna has Bachelor of Science (2017) and Doctor of Medicine (2022) degrees in medicine from the University of Iceland (HÍ). She was chair of Röskva from 2014 to 2015 and one of the founders of Hugrún, a mental health education society. She was a student representative on the university council at HÍ from 2016 to 2018 and chair of the student council at HÍ from 2017 to 2018. She was a doctor at the health centre in Garðabær and a resident in surgery at Landspítali.

Ragna led the Social Democratic Alliance's (Samfylkingin) campaign in Reykjavík during the 2018 municipal elections. She was a board member of Samfylkingin's Reykjavík branch from 2020 to 2021. She was president of the Young Social Democrats from 2020 to 2022. She was a member of Reykjavík City Council from 2020 to 2022. She was a substitute member of the Althing for Dagbjört Hákonardóttir in November 2023. She was elected to the Althing at the 2024 parliamentary election.
