= Ólöf Nordal =

Icelandic politician (1966–2017)

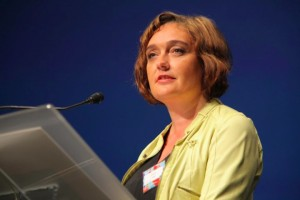

Minister of the Interior
- In office 4 December 2014 – 11 January 2017
- Prime Minister: Sigmundur Davíð Gunnlaugsson; Sigurður Ingi Jóhannsson
- Preceded by: Hanna Birna Kristjánsdóttir; Sigmundur Davíð Gunnlaugsson
- Succeeded by: Sigríður Á. Andersen (Justice); Jón Gunnarsson (Transport and Local Government)

Member of the Althing
- In office April 2007 – 2013
- Constituency: Northeast Constituency (2007–2009); Reykjavík Constituency South (2009–2013)

Personal details
- Born: 3 December 1966 Reykjavík, Iceland
- Died: 8 February 2017 (aged 50) Reykjavík, Iceland
- Party: Independence Party
- Spouse: Tómas Már Sigurðsson
- Children: 4
- Education: University of Iceland; University of Reykjavik

Ólöf Nordal (3 December 1966 – 8 February 2017) was an Icelandic politician who was the Minister of the Interior of Iceland from 4 December 2014 to 11 January 2017. She died on 8 February 2017. She was a member of the Independence Party.

== Early life ==
Ólöf graduated from Reykjavík Upper Secondary School in 1986. She received a law degree from the University of Iceland in 1994 and an MBA from Reykjavík University in 2002.

== Career ==
Ólöf worked as a teacher, lawyer, and in the administration prior to entering politics.

She served as a department head in the Ministry of Transport and Communications from 1996 through 1999. Thereafter, she worked as a lawyer for the Iceland Stock Exchange from 1999 until 2001, and as an instructor of law at Bifröst University from 1999 until 2002, where she chaired the Business Law Department.

Between 2002 and 2004, she served as head of wholesale business at Landsvirkjun and director of sales at RARIK – Iceland State Electricity. During her tenure at RARIK, electricity sales were transferred to a separate company, Orkusalan, where Ólöf served as managing director until 2006.

Ólöf was elected to the Parliament of Iceland in 2007. She was a Member of Parliament for the Northeast Constituency from 2007 to 2009 and for the Reykjavík Constituency South from 2009 to 2013.

=== Panama Papers ===
Ólöf appeared in the leaked Panama Papers in connection with offshore holdings. She was quoted as saying that she was "utterly surprised our names are on that list."

== Personal life ==
She was married to Tómas Már Sigurðsson and had four children. She died of cancer on 8 February 2017, aged 50.
