= Þórdís Kolbrún R. Gylfadóttir =

Icelandic politician (born 1987)

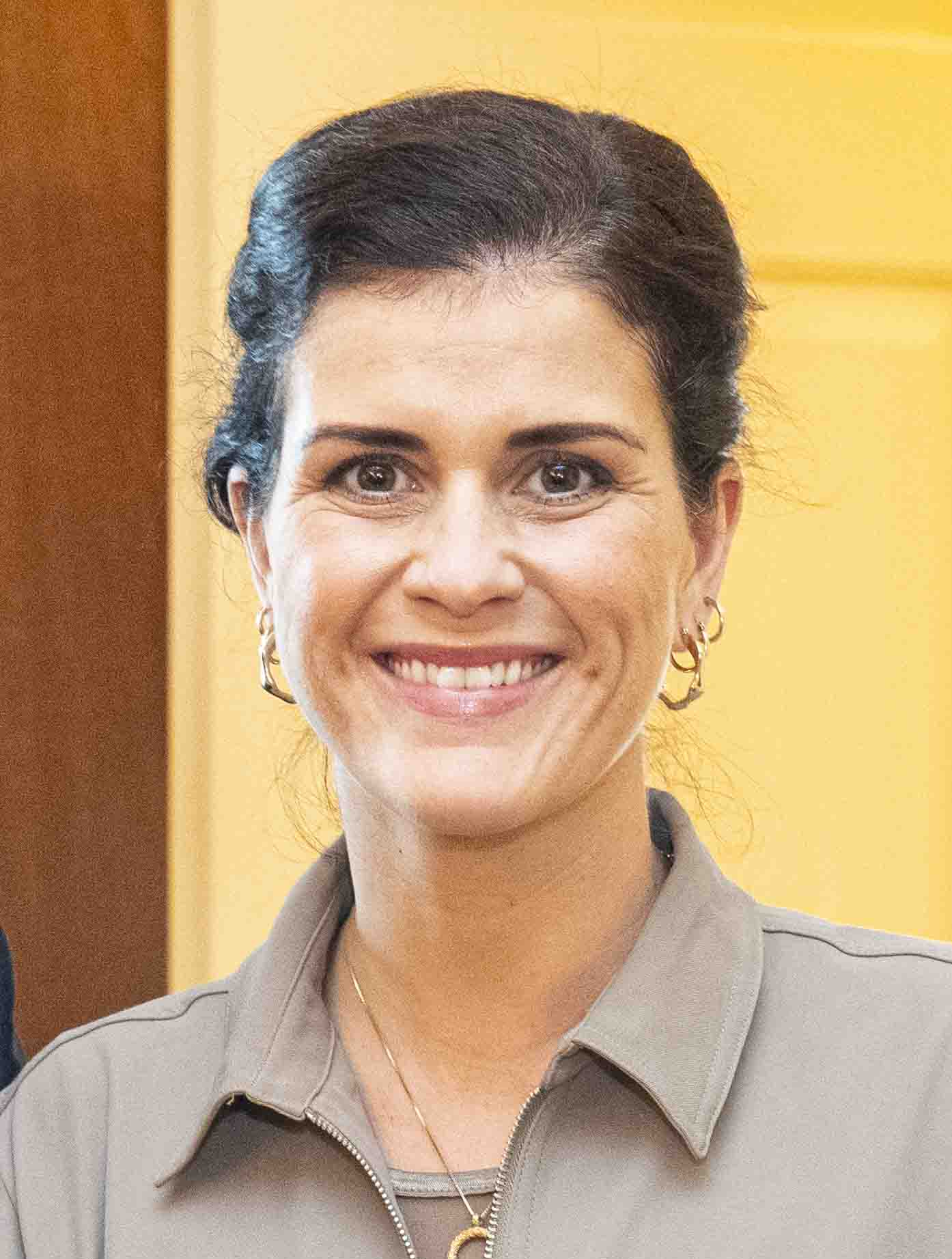
- Þórdís in 2024

Minister for Foreign Affairs
- In office 9 April 2024 – 21 December 2024
- Prime Minister: Bjarni Benediktsson
- Preceded by: Bjarni Benediktsson
- Succeeded by: Þorgerður Katrín Gunnarsdóttir
- In office 28 November 2021 – 14 October 2023
- Prime Minister: Katrín Jakobsdóttir
- Preceded by: Guðlaugur Þór Þórðarson
- Succeeded by: Bjarni Benediktsson

Minister for Finance and Economic Affairs
- In office 14 October 2023 – 9 April 2024
- Prime Minister: Katrín Jakobsdóttir
- Preceded by: Bjarni Benediktsson
- Succeeded by: Sigurður Ingi Jóhannsson

Minister of Tourism, Industry and Innovation
- In office 11 January 2017 – 28 November 2021
- Prime Minister: Bjarni Benediktsson; Katrín Jakobsdóttir
- Preceded by: Ragnheiður Elín Árnadóttir (Minister of Industry and Commerce)
- Succeeded by: Áslaug Arna Sigurbjörnsdóttir (Minister of Science, Industry and Innovation)

President of the Committee of Ministers of the Council of Europe
- In office 24 November 2022 – 17 May 2023
- Preceded by: Simon Coveney
- Succeeded by: Edgars Rinkēvičs

Minister of Justice
- In office 14 March 2019 – 5 September 2019
- Prime Minister: Katrín Jakobsdóttir
- Preceded by: Sigríður Á. Andersen
- Succeeded by: Áslaug Arna Sigurbjörnsdóttir

Member of the Althing
- Incumbent
- Assumed office 29 October 2016
- Constituency: Northwest (2016–2024); Southwest (2024–)

Personal details
- Born: 4 November 1987 (age 38) Akranes, Iceland
- Party: Independence Party
- Spouse: Hjalti Sigvaldason Mogensen
- Children: 2
- Education: Reykjavík University

Þórdís Kolbrún Reykfjörð Gylfadóttir (born 4 November 1987) is an Icelandic lawyer and politician of the Independence Party. She most recently served as the minister of foreign affairs in 2024, having previously held the portfolio from 2021 to 2023. She also served as finance minister from 2023 to 2024 and tourism and industry minister from 2017 to 2021. She is currently Special Envoy of Council of Europe Secretary General on the situation of children of Ukraine appointed.

== Political career ==
Þórdís has been a member of the Althing (Iceland's parliament) for the Northwest Constituency since 2016, as a representative of the Independence Party. From 2018 to 2025, she was the party's vice-chair. At the 2025 party convention, she was succeeded by Jens Garðar Helgason.

Þórdís has previously held the positions of Minister for Foreign Affairs, Minister of Tourism, Industry and Innovation, and Minister of Justice. At the age of 29, she became the youngest woman to become an Icelandic Minister.

During her time as Minister for Foreign Affairs, Þórdís held the rotating chairmanship of the Council of Europe's Committee of Ministers from November 2022 to May 2023. In July 2023, she announced that Iceland would suspend its embassy in Moscow due to not meeting the priorities of the country's foreign service in its current state. She added that the suspension did not mean they would be cutting diplomatic relations with Russia.

On 14 October 2023, she was appointed Minister for Finance and Economic Affairs in a minor reshuffle following Bjarni Benediktsson's resignation.

On 9 April 2024, she was reappointed Minister for Foreign Affairs after Bjarni Benediktsson succeeded Katrín Jakobsdóttir when the latter decided to run in the 2024 presidential election.

She and her Nordic counterparts signed a joint letter in late October condemning Israel's planned bill that would seek to ban the UNRWA from operating in the country and in effect the Palestinian areas. Furthermore, they urged the Knesset to reconsider passing the bill.

== Recognition ==
In 2023, Þórdís received the Cross of Good Neighbourhood from Sviatlana Tsikhanouskaya. The distinction is awarded by the Belarusian United Transitional Cabinet to outstanding individuals who have significantly helped the cause of Belarusians.

Party political offices
Preceded by Ólöf Nordal	Vice-Chairman of the Independence Party; 2018–2025	Succeeded by Jens Garðar Helgason
Political offices
Preceded by Ragnheiður Elín Árnadóttir as Minister of Industry and Commerce	Minister of Tourism, Industry and Innovation; 2017–2021	Succeeded by Áslaug Arna Sigurbjörnsdóttir as Minister of Science, Industry and Innovation
Preceded by Sigríður Á. Andersen	Minister of Justice; 2019	Succeeded by Áslaug Arna Sigurbjörnsdóttir
Preceded by Guðlaugur Þór Þórðarson	Minister for Foreign Affairs; 2021–2023	Succeeded by Bjarni Benediktsson
Preceded by Bjarni Benediktsson	Minister for Finance and Economic Affairs; 2023–2024	Succeeded by Sigurður Ingi Jóhannsson
Preceded by Bjarni Benediktsson	Minister for Foreign Affairs; 2024	Succeeded by Þorgerður Katrín Gunnarsdóttir
