= Guðlaugur Þór Þórðarson =

Icelandic politician (born 1967)

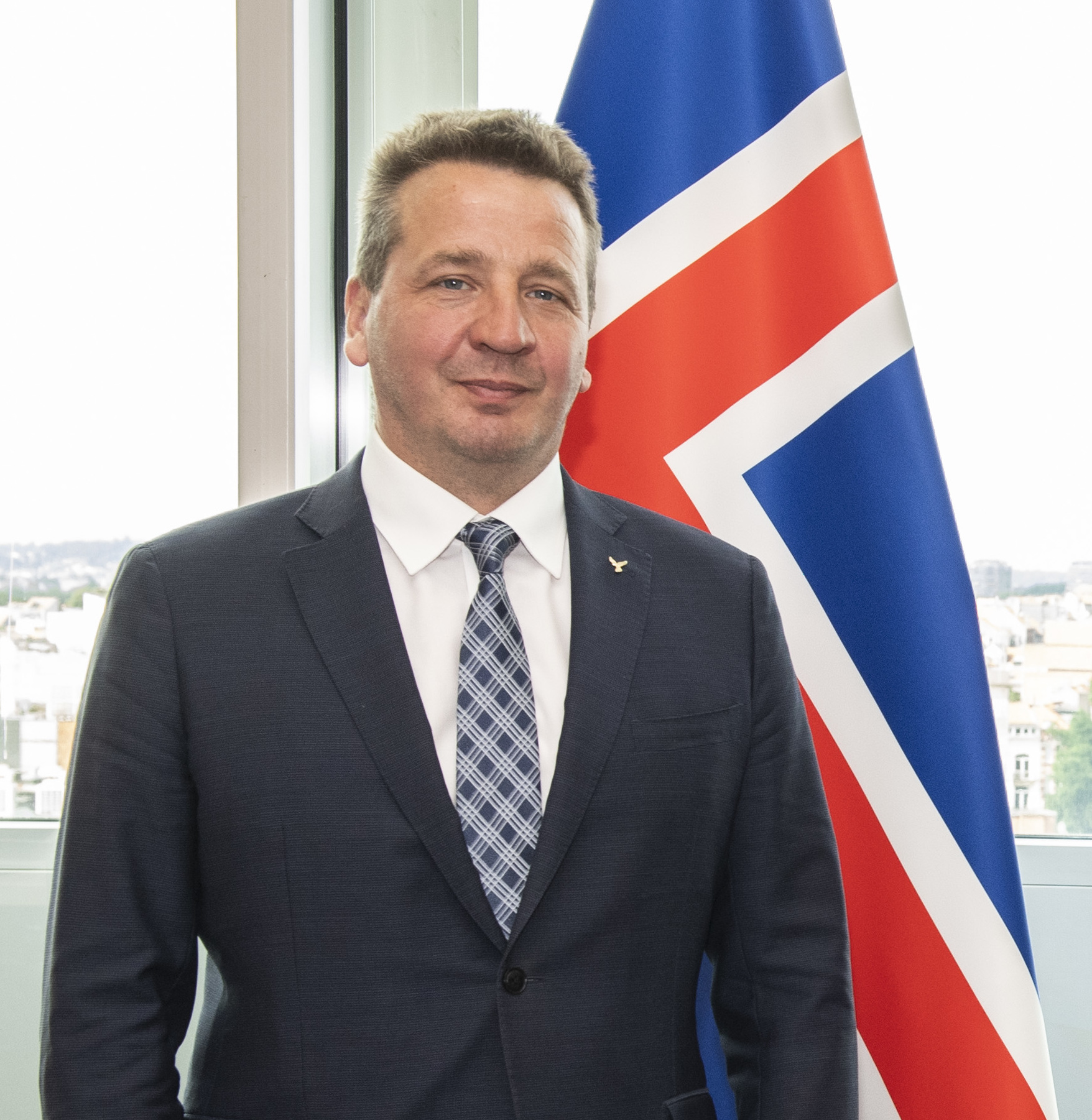
- Guðlaugur in 2021

Minister for the Environment, Energy and Climate
- In office 28 November 2021 – 21 December 2024
- Prime Minister: Katrín Jakobsdóttir; Bjarni Benediktsson
- Preceded by: Guðmundur Ingi Guðbrandsson
- Succeeded by: Jóhann Páll Jóhannsson

Minister for Foreign Affairs
- In office 11 January 2017 – 28 November 2021
- Prime Minister: Bjarni Benediktsson; Katrín Jakobsdóttir
- Preceded by: Lilja Dögg Alfreðsdóttir
- Succeeded by: Þórdís Kolbrún R. Gylfadóttir

Minister for Health
- In office 24 May 2007 – 1 February 2009
- Prime Minister: Geir Haarde
- Preceded by: Siv Friðleifsdóttir (Health and Social Security)
- Succeeded by: Ögmundur Jónasson

Personal details
- Born: 19 December 1967 (age 58) Reykjavík, Iceland
- Party: Independence
- Spouse: Ágústa Johnson
- Children: 4
- Education: University of Iceland

Guðlaugur Þór Þórðarson (Icelandic pronunciation: [kvʏðlœyɣʏr̥ θouːr̥ θourðar̥son]; born 19 December 1967) is an Icelandic politician who served as Minister for the Environment, Energy and Climate from 2021 to 2024 and previously minister of foreign affairs from 2017 to 2021.

== Early life and education ==
Guðlaugur Þór Þórðarson graduated with a BA degree in Political Sciences from the University of Iceland in 1996.

== Political career ==
Guðlaugur started his involvement in the Independence party in 1987 when he was elected on the board of the National Youth Organisation of the Independence Party in which he served until 1997 of which he was vice chairman 1989–1993 and chairman 1993–1997. He was then elected on the Reykjavík City Council in 1998 and sat two four-year terms there. He sat on the parliamentary committee on welfare issues 2003–2006, the committee on fisheries 2003–2007, and the committee on the environment 2003–2007 (chairman 2004–2007).

He has been a member of the Althing (Iceland's parliament) for the Independence Party since 2003 and served as the Minister of Health from 24 May 2007 to 1 February 2009.

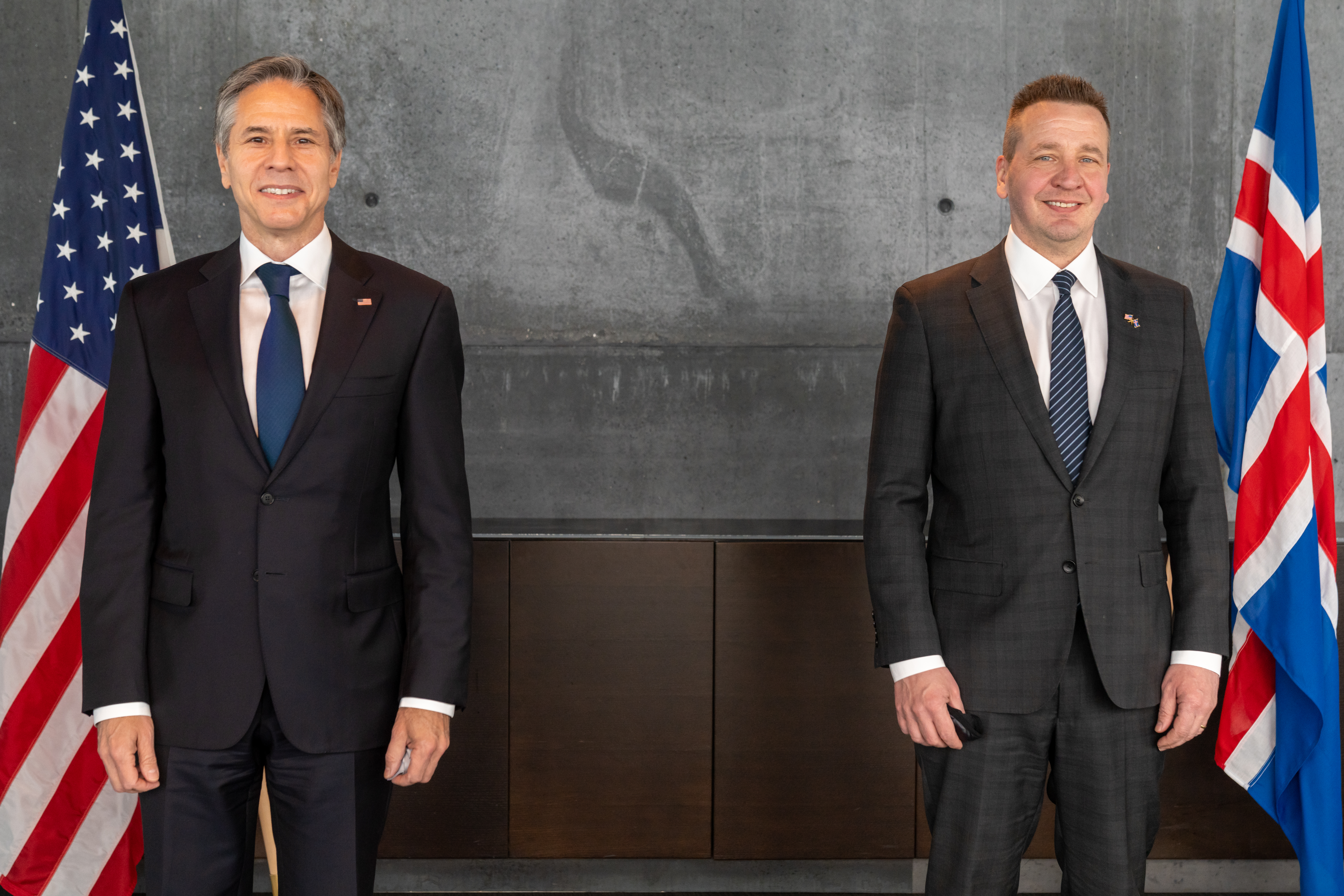
Guðlaugur meets with U.S. Secretary of State Antony J. Blinken in Reykjavik in May 2021.

Guðlaugur represented Reykjavík North 2003–2009, then switched to Reykjavík South for the 2009 elections before returning to Reykjavík North in 2013, where he has topped the party list for the last three elections. In the party primary in 2006 he defeated then Minister of Justice and Ecclesiastical Affairs Björn Bjarnason for the top spot in Reykjavík North.

He has served as Minister for Foreign Affairs since 11 January 2017.

Guðlaugur opposes Icelandic membership of the European Union. He is strongly supportive of Iceland's membership of the European Economic Area, describing the benefits as substantial.

== Personal life ==
He is married and has four children.

== See also ==
- List of foreign ministers in 2017

Political offices
Preceded by Siv Friðleifsdóttir as Minister of Health and Social Security	Minister for Health; 2007–2009	Succeeded by Ögmundur Jónasson
Preceded by Lilja Dögg Alfreðsdóttir	Minister for Foreign Affairs; 2017–2021	Succeeded by Þórdís Kolbrún R. Gylfadóttir
Preceded by Guðmundur Ingi Guðbrandsson	Minister for the Environment, Energy and Climate; 2021–2024	Succeeded by Jóhann Páll Jóhannsson
