= Cabinet of Sigurður Ingi Jóhannsson =

Government of Iceland from April 2016 to January 2017

- 43rd Cabinet of Iceland

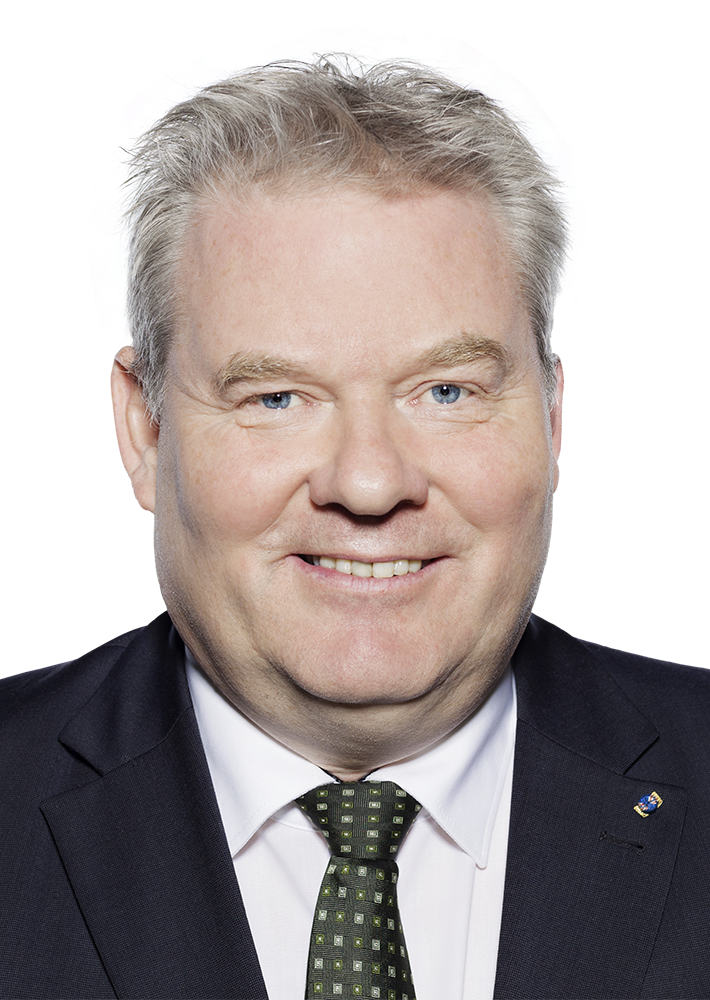
- Sigurður Ingi Jóhannsson
- Date formed: 7 April 2016
- Date dissolved: 11 January 2017

People and organisations
- President: Ólafur Ragnar Grímsson
- Prime Minister: Sigurður Ingi Jóhannsson
- No. of ministers: 10
- Member parties: Independence Party (D); Progressive Party (B)
- Status in legislature: Majority government (coalition)
- Opposition parties: Social Democratic Alliance (S); Left-Green Movement (V); Bright Future (A); Pirates (P)

History
- Predecessor: Sigmundur Davíð Gunnlaugsson
- Successor: Bjarni Benediktsson, Jr

The Cabinet of Sigurður Ingi Jóhannsson in Iceland was formed 7 April 2016, following the resignation of Prime Minister Sigmundur Davíð Gunnlaugsson.

== Cabinet ==
Incumbent	Minister	Ministry	Party
Sigurður Ingi Jóhannsson	Prime Minister (Forsætisráðherra)	Prime Minister's Office (Forsætisráðuneytið)	B
Lilja Dögg Alfreðsdóttir	Minister for Foreign Affairs (Utanríkisráðherra)	Ministry for Foreign Affairs (Utanríkisráðuneytið)	B
Bjarni Benediktsson	Minister of Finance and Economic Affairs (Fjármála- og efnahagsráðherra)	Ministry of Finance and Economic Affairs (Fjármála- og efnahagsráðuneytið)	D
Ólöf Nordal	Minister of the Interior (Innanríkisráðherra)	Ministry of the Interior (Innanríkisráðuneytið)	D
Gunnar Bragi Sveinsson	Minister of Fisheries and Agriculture (Sjávarútvegs- og landbúnaðarráðherra)	Ministry of Industries and Innovation (Atvinnuvega- og nýsköpunarráðuneytið)	B
Ragnheiður Elín Árnadóttir	Minister of Industry and Commerce (Iðnaðar- og viðskiptaráðherra)	Ministry of Industries and Innovation (Atvinnuvega- og nýsköpunarráðuneytið)	D
Sigrún Magnúsdóttir	Minister for the Environment and Natural Resources (Umhverfis- og auðlindaráðherra)	Ministry for the Environment and Natural Resources (Umhverfis- og auðlindaráðuneytið)	B
Illugi Gunnarsson	Minister of Education, Science and Culture (Mennta- og menningarmálaráðherra)	Ministry of Education, Science and Culture (Mennta- og menningarmálaráðuneytið)	D
Eygló Harðardóttir	Minister of Social Affairs and Housing (Félags- og húsnæðismálaráðherra)	Ministry of Welfare (Velferðarráðuneytið)	B
Kristján Þór Júlíusson	Minister of Health (Heilbrigðisráðherra)	Ministry of Welfare (Velferðarráðuneytið)	D

== See also ==
- Government of Iceland
- Cabinet of Iceland
