= Cabinet of Sigmundur Davíð Gunnlaugsson =

Government of Iceland from May 2013 to April 2016

- 42nd Cabinet of Iceland

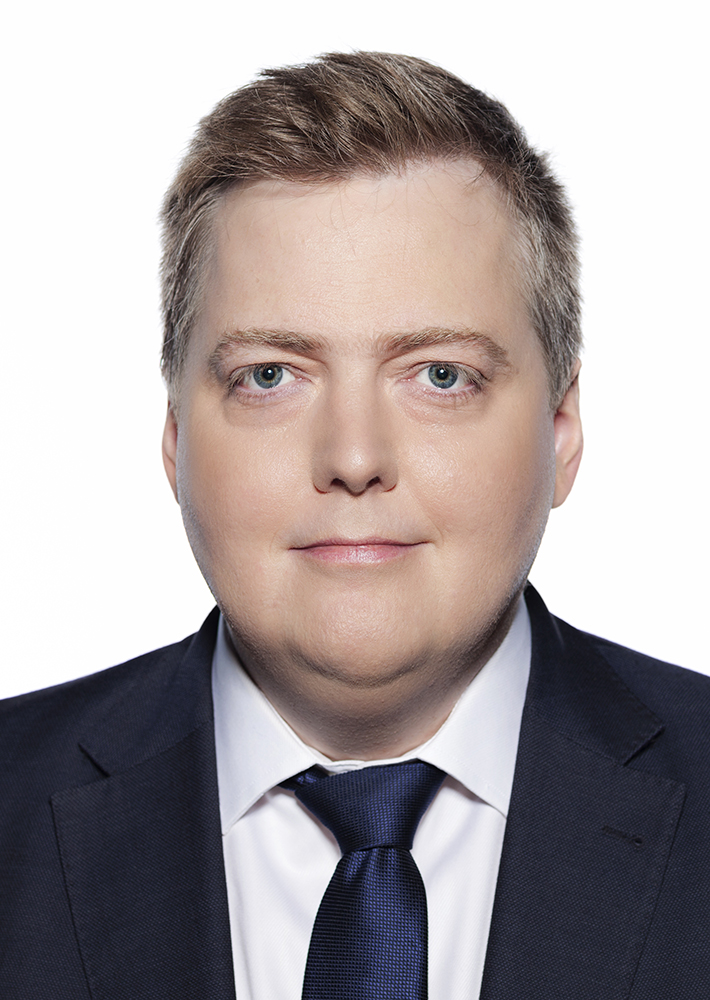
- Sigmundur Davíð Gunnlaugsson
- Date formed: 23 May 2013
- Date dissolved: 7 April 2016

People and organisations
- President: Ólafur Ragnar Grímsson
- Prime Minister: Sigmundur Davíð Gunnlaugsson
- No. of ministers: 10
- Member parties: Independence Party (D); Progressive Party (B)
- Status in legislature: Majority government (coalition)
- Opposition parties: Social Democratic Alliance (S); Left-Green Movement (V); Bright Future (A); Pirates (P)

History
- Election: 2013 Icelandic parliamentary election
- Predecessor: Jóhanna Sigurðardóttir II
- Successor: Sigurður Ingi Jóhannsson

The Cabinet of Sigmundur Davíð Gunnlaugsson in Iceland, nicknamed “The Panama government” (Icelandic: Panamastjórnin) or “The government of leaks” (Icelandic: Lekastjórnin), was formed 23 May 2013. The cabinet left office 7 April 2016 due to the Panama Papers leak.

== Cabinet ==
=== Inaugural cabinet: 23 May 2013 – 26 August 2014 ===
Incumbent	Minister	Ministry	Party
Sigmundur Davíð Gunnlaugsson	Prime Minister (Forsætisráðherra)	Prime Minister's Office (Forsætisráðuneytið)	B
Bjarni Benediktsson	Minister of Finance and Economic Affairs (Fjármála- og efnahagsráðherra)	Ministry of Finance and Economic Affairs (Fjármála- og efnahagsráðuneytið)	D
Eygló Harðardóttir	Minister of Social Affairs and Housing (Félags- og húsnæðismálaráðherra)	Ministry of Welfare (Velferðarráðuneytið)	B
Gunnar Bragi Sveinsson	Minister for Foreign Affairs (Utanríkisráðherra)	Ministry for Foreign Affairs (Utanríkisráðuneytið)	B
Hanna Birna Kristjánsdóttir	Minister of the Interior (Innanríkisráðherra)	Ministry of the Interior (Innanríkisráðuneytið)	D
Illugi Gunnarsson	Minister of Education, Science and Culture (Mennta- og menningarmálaráðherra)	Ministry of Education, Science and Culture (Mennta- og menningarmálaráðuneytið)	D
Kristján Þór Júlíusson	Minister of Health (Heilbrigðisráðherra)	Ministry of Welfare (Velferðarráðuneytið)	D
Ragnheiður Elín Árnadóttir	Minister of Industry and Commerce (Iðnaðar- og viðskiptaráðherra)	Ministry of Industries and Innovation (Atvinnuvega- og nýsköpunarráðuneytið)	D
Sigurður Ingi Jóhannsson	Minister for the Environment and Natural Resources (Umhverfis- og auðlindaráðherra)	Ministry for the Environment and Natural Resources (Umhverfis- og auðlindaráðuneytið)	B
Sigurður Ingi Jóhannsson	Minister of Fisheries and Agriculture (Sjávarútvegs- og landbúnaðarráðherra)	Ministry of Industries and Innovation (Atvinnuvega- og nýsköpunarráðuneytið)	B

=== First reshuffle: 26 August 2014 – 4 December 2014 ===
Due to a political scandal within the Ministry of the Interior, affairs relating to the judiciary, prosecution, law enforcement and civil defence were transferred to Prime Minister Sigmundur Davíð Gunnlaugsson hence making him the Minister of Justice.

Incumbent	Minister	Ministry	Party
Sigmundur Davíð Gunnlaugsson	Prime Minister (Forsætisráðherra)	Prime Minister's Office (Forsætisráðuneytið)	B
Sigmundur Davíð Gunnlaugsson	Minister of Justice (Dómsmálaráðherra)	Ministry of the Interior (Innanríkisráðuneytið)	B
Bjarni Benediktsson	Minister of Finance and Economic Affairs (Fjármála- og efnahagsráðherra)	Ministry of Finance and Economic Affairs (Fjármála- og efnahagsráðuneytið)	D
Eygló Harðardóttir	Minister of Social Affairs and Housing (Félags- og húsnæðismálaráðherra)	Ministry of Welfare (Velferðarráðuneytið)	B
Gunnar Bragi Sveinsson	Minister for Foreign Affairs (Utanríkisráðherra)	Ministry for Foreign Affairs (Utanríkisráðuneytið)	B
Hanna Birna Kristjánsdóttir	Minister of the Interior (Innanríkisráðherra)	Ministry of the Interior (Innanríkisráðuneytið)	D
Illugi Gunnarsson	Minister of Education, Science and Culture (Mennta- og menningarmálaráðherra)	Ministry of Education, Science and Culture (Mennta- og menningarmálaráðuneytið)	D
Kristján Þór Júlíusson	Minister of Health (Heilbrigðisráðherra)	Ministry of Welfare (Velferðarráðuneytið)	D
Ragnheiður Elín Árnadóttir	Minister of Industry and Commerce (Iðnaðar- og viðskiptaráðherra)	Ministry of Industries and Innovation (Atvinnuvega- og nýsköpunarráðuneytið)	D
Sigurður Ingi Jóhannsson	Minister for the Environment and Natural Resources (Umhverfis- og auðlindaráðherra)	Ministry for the Environment and Natural Resources (Umhverfis- og auðlindaráðuneytið)	B
Sigurður Ingi Jóhannsson	Minister of Fisheries and Agriculture (Sjávarútvegs- og landbúnaðarráðherra)	Ministry of Industries and Innovation (Atvinnuvega- og nýsköpunarráðuneytið)	B

=== Second reshuffle: 4 December 2014 – 31 December 2014 ===
Ólöf Nordal replaced Hanna Birna Kristjánsdóttir as Minister of the Interior. Affairs relating to the judiciary, prosecution, law enforcement and civil defence were transferred back to the Minister of the Interior.

Incumbent	Minister	Ministry	Party
Sigmundur Davíð Gunnlaugsson	Prime Minister (Forsætisráðherra)	Prime Minister's Office (Forsætisráðuneytið)	B
Bjarni Benediktsson	Minister of Finance and Economic Affairs (Fjármála- og efnahagsráðherra)	Ministry of Finance and Economic Affairs (Fjármála- og efnahagsráðuneytið)	D
Eygló Harðardóttir	Minister of Social Affairs and Housing (Félags- og húsnæðismálaráðherra)	Ministry of Welfare (Velferðarráðuneytið)	B
Gunnar Bragi Sveinsson	Minister for Foreign Affairs (Utanríkisráðherra)	Ministry for Foreign Affairs (Utanríkisráðuneytið)	B
Illugi Gunnarsson	Minister of Education, Science and Culture (Mennta- og menningarmálaráðherra)	Ministry of Education, Science and Culture (Mennta- og menningarmálaráðuneytið)	D
Kristján Þór Júlíusson	Minister of Health (Heilbrigðisráðherra)	Ministry of Welfare (Velferðarráðuneytið)	D
Ólöf Nordal	Minister of the Interior (Innanríkisráðherra)	Ministry of the Interior (Innanríkisráðuneytið)	D
Ragnheiður Elín Árnadóttir	Minister of Industry and Commerce (Iðnaðar- og viðskiptaráðherra)	Ministry of Industries and Innovation (Atvinnuvega- og nýsköpunarráðuneytið)	D
Sigurður Ingi Jóhannsson	Minister for the Environment and Natural Resources (Umhverfis- og auðlindaráðherra)	Ministry for the Environment and Natural Resources (Umhverfis- og auðlindaráðuneytið)	B
Sigurður Ingi Jóhannsson	Minister of Fisheries and Agriculture (Sjávarútvegs- og landbúnaðarráðherra)	Ministry of Industries and Innovation (Atvinnuvega- og nýsköpunarráðuneytið)	B

=== Third reshuffle: 31 December 2014 – 7 April 2016 ===
Sigrún Magnúsdóttir replaced Sigurður Ingi Jóhannsson as Minister for the Environment and Natural Resources.

Incumbent	Minister	Ministry	Party
Sigmundur Davíð Gunnlaugsson	Prime Minister (Forsætisráðherra)	Prime Minister's Office (Forsætisráðuneytið)	B
Bjarni Benediktsson	Minister of Finance and Economic Affairs (Fjármála- og efnahagsráðherra)	Ministry of Finance and Economic Affairs (Fjármála- og efnahagsráðuneytið)	D
Eygló Harðardóttir	Minister of Social Affairs and Housing (Félags- og húsnæðismálaráðherra)	Ministry of Welfare (Velferðarráðuneytið)	B
Gunnar Bragi Sveinsson	Minister for Foreign Affairs (Utanríkisráðherra)	Ministry for Foreign Affairs (Utanríkisráðuneytið)	B
Illugi Gunnarsson	Minister of Education, Science and Culture (Mennta- og menningarmálaráðherra)	Ministry of Education, Science and Culture (Mennta- og menningarmálaráðuneytið)	D
Kristján Þór Júlíusson	Minister of Health (Heilbrigðisráðherra)	Ministry of Welfare (Velferðarráðuneytið)	D
Ólöf Nordal	Minister of the Interior (Innanríkisráðherra)	Ministry of the Interior (Innanríkisráðuneytið)	D
Ragnheiður Elín Árnadóttir	Minister of Industry and Commerce (Iðnaðar- og viðskiptaráðherra)	Ministry of Industries and Innovation (Atvinnuvega- og nýsköpunarráðuneytið)	D
Sigrún Magnúsdóttir	Minister for the Environment and Natural Resources (Umhverfis- og auðlindaráðherra)	Ministry for the Environment and Natural Resources (Umhverfis- og auðlindaráðuneytið)	B
Sigurður Ingi Jóhannsson	Minister of Fisheries and Agriculture (Sjávarútvegs- og landbúnaðarráðherra)	Ministry of Industries and Innovation (Atvinnuvega- og nýsköpunarráðuneytið)	B

== See also ==
- Government of Iceland
- Cabinet of Iceland
