= Cabinet of Bjarni Benediktsson (2017) =

Government of Iceland from January to September 2017

- 44th Cabinet of Iceland

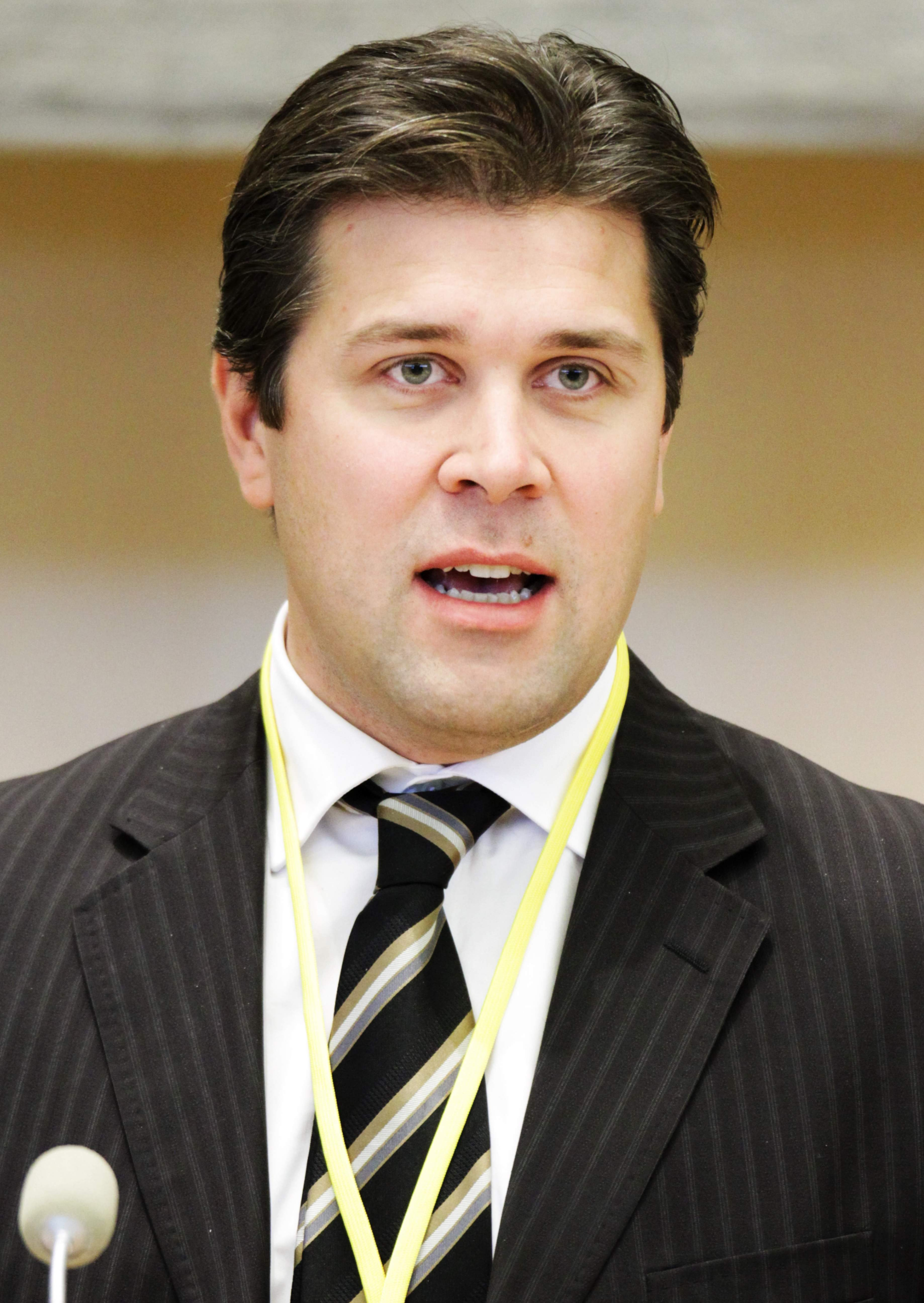
- Date formed: 11 January 2017
- Date dissolved: 15 September 2017

People and organisations
- President: Guðni Th. Jóhannesson
- Prime Minister: Bjarni Benediktsson
- No. of ministers: 11
- Member parties: Independence Party (D); Viðreisn (C); Bright Future (A)
- Status in legislature: Majority government (coalition)
- Opposition parties: Social Democratic Alliance (S); People's Party (F); Pirate Party (P); Viðreisn (C); Centre Party (M)

History
- Election: 2016 parliamentary election
- Predecessor: Sigurður Ingi Jóhannsson
- Successor: Katrín Jakobsdóttir

The Cabinet of Bjarni Benediktsson, nicknamed “The DAC government” (Icelandic: DAC stjórnin) or “The Kópavogur government” (Icelandic: Kópavogsstjórnin), was formed on 11 January 2017, following the 2016 parliamentary election. The cabinet was led by Bjarni Benediktsson of the Independence Party, who served as Prime Minister of Iceland.

The cabinet was a coalition government consisting the Independence Party, Viðreisn and Bright Future. Together they held 32 of the 63 seats in the Parliament of Iceland and served as a majority government. In the cabinet, there were eleven ministers where six were from the Independence Party, three were from Viðreisn and two were from Bright Future.

The government collapsed in September after Bright Future withdrew following a scandal involving Bjarni and his father, which triggered the 2017 Icelandic parliamentary election.

== Cabinet ==
Incumbent	Minister	Ministry	Party
Bjarni Benediktsson	Prime Minister	Prime Minister's Office	D
Guðlaugur Þór Þórðarson	Minister for Foreign Affairs	Ministry for Foreign Affairs	D
Benedikt Jóhannesson	Minister of Finance and Economic Affairs	Ministry of Finance and Economic Affairs	C
Sigríður Ásthildur Andersen	Minister of Justice	Ministry of the Interior	D
Jón Gunnarsson	Minister of Transport and Local Government	Ministry of the Interior	D
Þorgerður Katrín Gunnarsdóttir	Minister of Fisheries and Agriculture	Ministry of Industries and Innovation	C
Þórdís Kolbrún Reykfjörð Gylfadóttir	Minister of Tourism, Industry and Innovation	Ministry of Industries and Innovation	D
Björt Ólafsdóttir	Minister for the Environment and Natural Resources	Ministry for the Environment and Natural Resources	A
Kristján Þór Júlíusson	Minister of Education, Science and Culture	Ministry of Education, Science and Culture	D
Þorsteinn Víglundsson	Minister of Social Affairs and Equality	Ministry of Welfare	C
Óttarr Proppé	Minister of Health	Ministry of Welfare	A

== See also ==
- Government of Iceland
- Cabinet of Iceland
