= First cabinet of Katrín Jakobsdóttir =

Government of Iceland from 2017 to 2021

Cabinet of Katrín Jakobsdóttir
- 45th Cabinet of Iceland

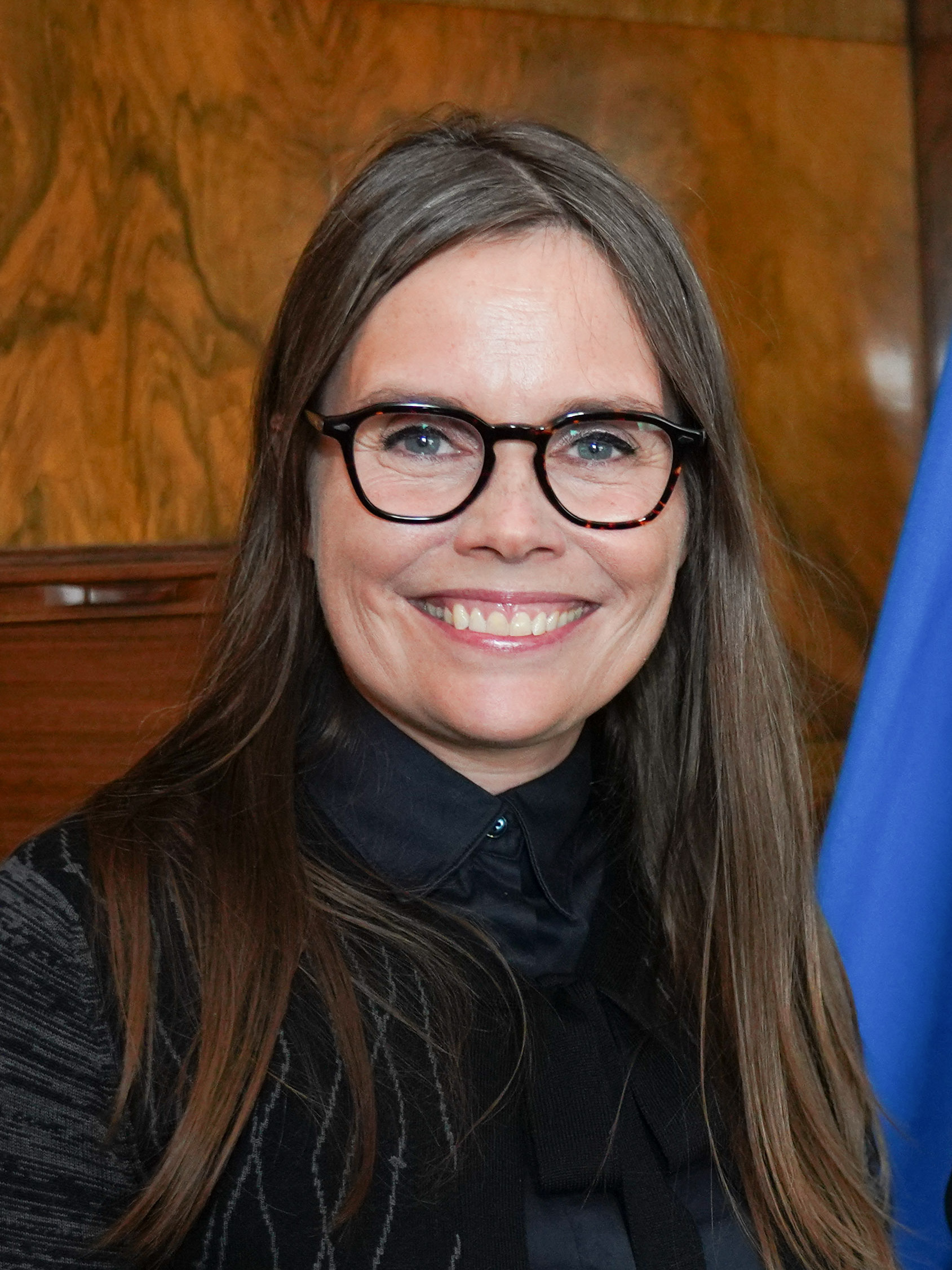
- Date formed: 30 November 2017
- Date dissolved: 28 November 2021

People and organisations
- President: Guðni Th. Jóhannesson
- Prime Minister: Katrín Jakobsdóttir
- No. of ministers: 11
- Member parties: Independence Party (D); Left-Green Movement (V); Progressive Party (B)
- Status in legislature: Majority government (coalition)
- Opposition parties: Social Democratic Alliance (S); Centre Party (M); Pirate Party (P); People's Party (F); Viðreisn (C)

History
- Election: 2017 parliamentary election
- Predecessor: Bjarni Benediktsson
- Successor: Katrín Jakobsdóttir II

The First cabinet of Katrín Jakobsdóttir, nicknamed “The covid government” (Icelandic: Covidstjórnin), was formed on 30 November 2017, following the 2017 parliamentary election. The cabinet was led by Katrín Jakobsdóttir of the Left-Green Movement, who served as Prime Minister of Iceland.

The cabinet was a coalition government consisting the Independence Party, the Left-Green Movement and the Progressive Party. Together they held 33 of the 63 seats in the Parliament of Iceland (i.e. Althing; Icelandic: Alþingi) and served as a majority government. In the cabinet, there were eleven ministers, where five were from the Independence Party, three were from the Left-Green Movement and three were from the Progressive Party. After the election in 2017 the parties had 35 seats in the parliament, but since then two MPs have left the Left-Green Movement.

== Cabinet ==
Cabinet member	Minister	Ministry	Party
Katrín Jakobsdóttir	Prime Minister	Prime Minister's Office	V
Guðlaugur Þór Þórðarson	Minister for Foreign Affairs	Ministry for Foreign Affairs	D
Bjarni Benediktsson	Minister of Finance and Economic Affairs	Ministry of Finance and Economic Affairs	D
Sigurður Ingi Jóhannsson	Minister of Transport and Local Government	Ministry of Transport and Local Government	B
Sigríður Á. Andersen (until 14 March 2019)	Minister of Justice	Ministry of Justice	D
Þórdís Kolbrún R. Gylfadóttir (interim)	Minister of Justice	Ministry of Justice	D
Áslaug Arna Sigurbjörnsdóttir (from 15 September 2019)	Minister of Justice	Ministry of Justice	D
Þórdís Kolbrún R. Gylfadóttir	Minister of Tourism, Industry and Innovation	Ministry of Industries and Innovation	D
Kristján Þór Júlíusson	Minister of Fisheries and Agriculture	Ministry of Industries and Innovation	D
Guðmundur Ingi Guðbrandsson	Minister for the Environment and Natural Resources	Ministry for the Environment and Natural Resources	V
Lilja Dögg Alfreðsdóttir	Minister of Education, Science and Culture	Ministry of Education, Science and Culture	B
Ásmundur Einar Daðason	Minister of Social Affairs and Equality	Ministry of Welfare	B
Svandís Svavarsdóttir	Minister of Health	Ministry of Welfare	V

== See also ==
- Government of Iceland
- Cabinet of Iceland
