= Minister of Welfare (Iceland) =

The Ministry of Welfare is a part of the Icelandic Government. As of November 2017, there are two ministers heading the Ministry of Welfare: Ásmundur Einar Daðason, Minister of Social Affairs and Equality, and Svandís Svavarsdóttir, Minister of Health.

== List of ministers ==
=== Minister of Welfare (1 January 2011 – 23 May 2013) ===
Nº	Minister	Took office	Left office	Duration	Party	Cabinet
1	Guðbjartur Hannesson (1950–2015)	1 January 2011	23 May 2013	2 years, 4 months, 22 days (873 days)	SDA	Jóhanna Sigurðardóttir II

=== Minister of Social Affairs and Equality (23 May 2013 – present) ===
Nº	Minister	Took office	Left office	Duration	Party	Cabinet
1	Eygló Harðardóttir (1972–) Minister of Social Affairs and Housing	23 May 2013	11 January 2017	3 years, 7 months, 19 days (1,329 days)	PP	Sigmundur Davíð Gunnlaugsson
1	Eygló Harðardóttir (1972–) Minister of Social Affairs and Housing	23 May 2013	11 January 2017	3 years, 7 months, 19 days (1,329 days)	PP	Sigurður Ingi Jóhannsson
2	Þorsteinn Víglundsson (1969–)	11 January 2017	30 November 2017	10 months, 19 day (323 days)	C	Bjarni Benediktsson
3	Ásmundur Einar Daðason (1982–)	30 November 2017	Incumbent	8 years, 248 days (3170 days)	PP	Katrín Jakobsdóttir

=== Minister of Health (23 May 2013 – present) ===
Nº	Minister	Took office	Left office	Duration	Party	Cabinet
1	Kristján Þór Júlíusson (1957–)	23 May 2013	11 January 2017	3 years, 7 months, 19 days (1,329 days)	IP	Sigmundur Davíð Gunnlaugsson
1	Kristján Þór Júlíusson (1957–)	23 May 2013	11 January 2017	3 years, 7 months, 19 days (1,329 days)	IP	Sigurður Ingi Jóhannsson
2	Óttarr Proppé (1968–)	11 January 2017	30 November 2017	10 months, 19 day (323 days)	BF	Bjarni Benediktsson
3	Svandís Svavarsdóttir (1964–)	30 November 2017	Incumbent	8 years, 248 days (3170 days)	LGM	Katrín Jakobsdóttir
