= Björt Ólafsdóttir =

Icelandic politician

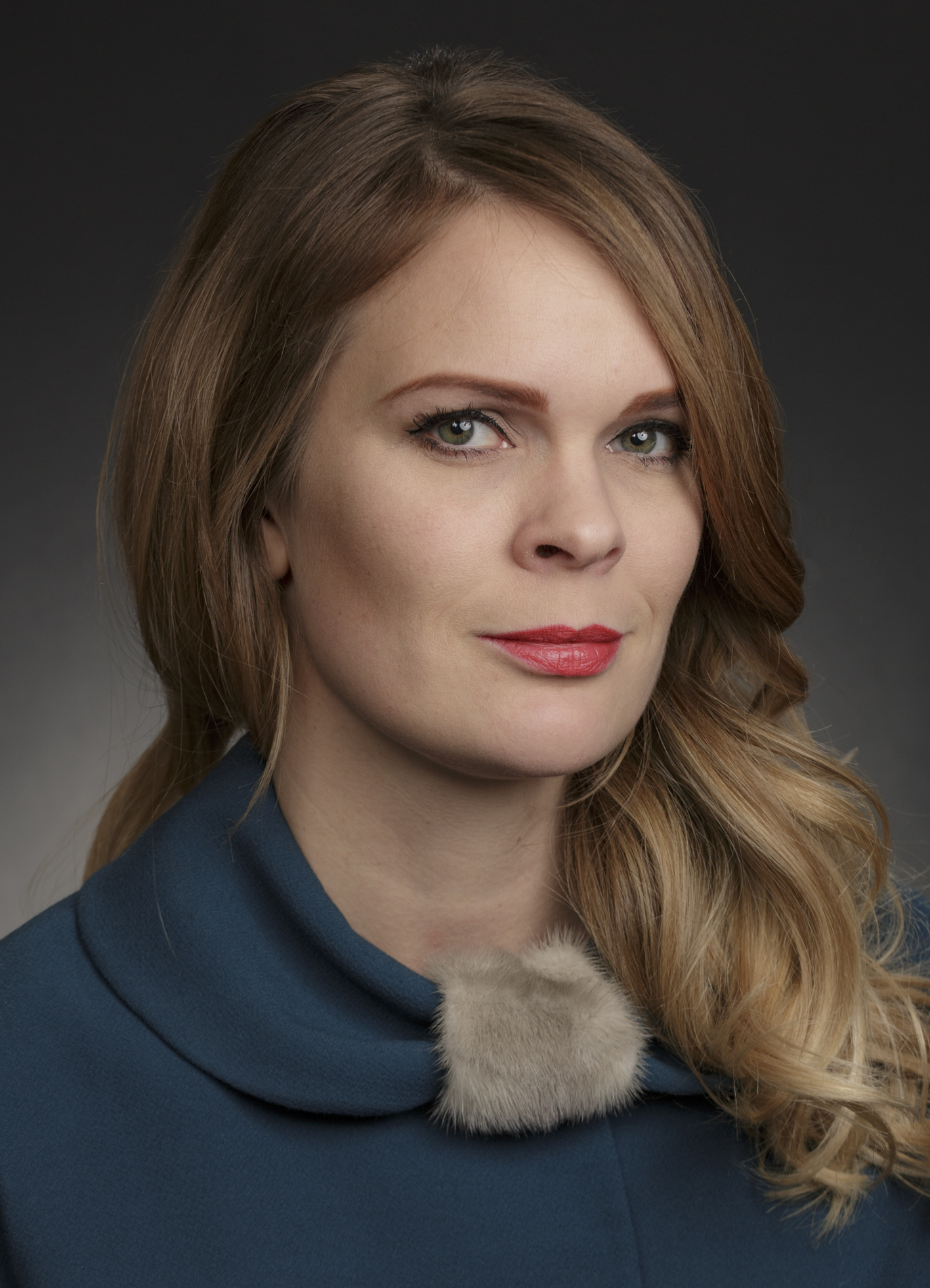
- Ólafsdóttir in 2016

Chairperson of Bright Future
- Incumbent
- Assumed office 25 November 2017
- Preceded by: Óttarr Proppé

Minister for the Environment and Natural Resources
- In office 11 January 2017 – 30 November 2017
- Prime Minister: Bjarni Benediktsson
- Preceded by: Sigrún Magnúsdóttir
- Succeeded by: Guðmundur Ingi Guðbrandsson

Personal details
- Born: 2 March 1983 (age 43)
- Party: Bright Future

Björt Ólafsdóttir is an Icelandic politician who represented Bright Future in the Althing 2013-17 and is its current chairperson. She served as the Minister for the Environment and Natural Resources of Iceland from January to November 2017.

Bright Future was formed to contest the 2013 Icelandic parliamentary election, which is when Björt entered the Althing as one of the new party's six MPs. She was elected chairperson of her party on 25 November 2017, after the previous chair Óttarr Proppé resigned following the results of the 2017 election, in which Bright Future lost every seat it held.

In March 2015 she joined the protest #FreeTheNipple on Twitter, which was directed against censorship on women's bodies and sexism. She joined the protest by posting a picture of her naked left breast.

== Ministerial career ==
Following parliamentary elections in 2016, a new coalition government with Björt as Minister of Environment was formed in January 2017 comprising the Independence Party, Viðreisn and Bright Future, which lasted until the parliamentary elections in October 2017. It continued as a caretaker government during the government negotiations in November.
