= Second cabinet of Jóhanna Sigurðardóttir =

Government of Iceland from May 2009 to May 2013

- 41st Cabinet of Iceland

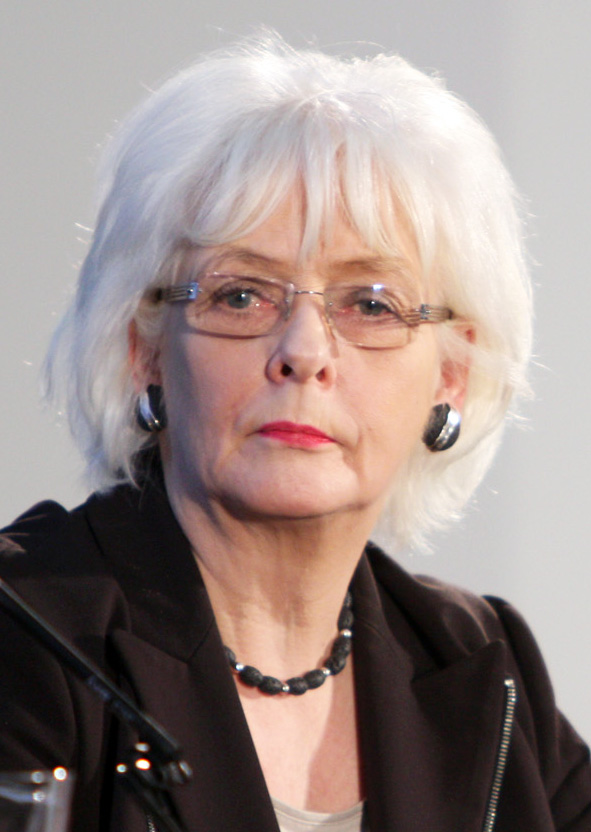
- Jóhanna Sigurðardóttir
- Date formed: 10 May 2009
- Date dissolved: 23 May 2013

People and organisations
- President: Ólafur Ragnar Grímsson
- Prime Minister: Jóhanna Sigurðardóttir
- No. of ministers: 12
- Member parties: Social Democratic Alliance (S); Left-Green Movement (V); Independents
- Status in legislature: Majority government (coalition)
- Opposition parties: Independence Party (D); Progressive Party (B); Citizens' Movement (O)

History
- Election: 2009
- Outgoing election: 2013
- Predecessor: Jóhanna Sigurðardóttir I
- Successor: Sigmundur Davíð Gunnlaugsson

The Second cabinet of Jóhanna Sigurðardóttir in Iceland, nicknamed “The welfare government” (Icelandic: Velferðarstjórnin) or “The sixth left government” (Icelandic: Vinstristjórn VI), was formed 10 May 2009. The cabinet left office on 23 May 2013.

== Cabinets ==
=== Inaugural cabinet: 10 May 2009 – 1 October 2009 ===
Incumbent	Minister	Ministry	Party
Jóhanna Sigurðardóttir	Prime Minister (Forsætisráðherra)	Prime Minister's Office (Forsætisráðuneytið)	S
Árni Páll Árnason	Minister of Social Affairs and Social Security (Félags- og tryggingamálaráðherra)	Ministry of Social Affairs and Social Security (Félags- og tryggingamálaráðuneytið)	S
Gylfi Magnússon	Minister of Trade (Viðskiptaráðherra)	Ministry of Trade (Viðskiptaráðuneytið)	Independent
Jón Bjarnason	Minister of Fisheries and Agriculture (Sjávarútvegs- og landbúnaðarráðherra)	Ministry of Fisheries and Agriculture (Sjávarútvegs- og landbúnaðarráðuneytið)	V
Katrín Jakobsdóttir	Minister of Education, Science and Culture (Menntamálaráðherra)	Ministry of Education, Science and Culture (Menntamálaráðuneytið)	V
Katrín Júlíusdóttir	Minister of Industry, Energy and Tourism (Iðnaðarráðherra)	Ministry of Industry, Energy and Tourism (Iðnaðarráðuneytið)	S
Kristján L. Möller	Minister of Communications (Samgönguráðherra)	Ministry of Communications (Samgönguráðuneytið)	S
Ögmundur Jónasson	Minister of Health (Heilbrigðisráðherra)	Ministry of Health (Heilbrigðisráðuneytið)	V
Össur Skarphéðinsson	Minister for Foreign Affairs (Utanríkisráðherra)	Ministry for Foreign Affairs (Utanríkisráðuneytið)	S
Ragna Árnadóttir	Minister of Justice and Ecclesiastical Affairs (Dóms- og kirkjumálaráðherra)	Ministry of Justice and Ecclesiastical Affairs (Dóms- og kirkjumálaráðuneytið)	Independent
Steingrímur J. Sigfússon	Minister of Finance (Fjármálaráðherra)	Ministry of Finance (Fjármálaráðuneytið)	V
Svandís Svavarsdóttir	Minister for the Environment (Umhverfisráðherra)	Ministry for the Environment (Umhverfisráðuneytið)	V

=== First reshuffle: 1 October 2009 – 2 September 2010 ===
The Ministry of Communications (Samgönguráðuneytið) was renamed the Ministry of Transport, Communications and Local Government (Samgöngu- og sveitarstjórnarráðuneytið). The Ministry of Education, Science and Culture was renamed in Icelandic from Menntamálaráðuneytið (lit. Ministry of Education) to Mennta- og menningarmálaráðuneytið (lit. Ministry of Education and Culture) but the English name was unchanged. The Ministry of Trade (Viðskiptaráðuneytið) was renamed Ministry of Economic Affairs (Efnahags- og viðskiptaráðuneytið). The Ministry of Justice and Ecclesiastical Affairs (Dóms- og kirkjumálaráðuneytið) was renamed Ministry of Justice and Human Rights (Dómsmála- og mannréttindaráðuneytið). Álfheiður Ingadóttir replaced Ögmundur Jónasson as Minister of Health.

Incumbent	Minister	Ministry	Party
Jóhanna Sigurðardóttir	Prime Minister (Forsætisráðherra)	Prime Minister's Office (Forsætisráðuneytið)	S
Álfheiður Ingadóttir	Minister of Health (Heilbrigðisráðherra)	Ministry of Health (Heilbrigðisráðuneytið)	V
Árni Páll Árnason	Minister of Social Affairs and Social Security (Félags- og tryggingamálaráðherra)	Ministry of Social Affairs and Social Security (Félags- og tryggingamálaráðuneytið)	S
Gylfi Magnússon	Minister of Economic Affairs (Efnahags- og viðskiptaráðherra)	Ministry of Economic Affairs (Efnahags- og viðskiptaráðuneytið)	Independent
Jón Bjarnason	Minister of Fisheries and Agriculture (Sjávarútvegs- og landbúnaðarráðherra)	Ministry of Fisheries and Agriculture (Sjávarútvegs- og landbúnaðarráðuneytið)	V
Katrín Jakobsdóttir	Minister of Education, Science and Culture (Mennta- og menningarmálaráðherra)	Ministry of Education, Science and Culture (Mennta- og menningarmálaráðuneytið)	V
Katrín Júlíusdóttir	Minister of Industry, Energy and Tourism (Iðnaðarráðherra)	Ministry of Industry, Energy and Tourism (Iðnaðarráðuneytið)	S
Kristján L. Möller	Minister of Transport, Communications and Local Government (Samgöngu- og sveitarstjórnarráðherra)	Ministry of Transport, Communications and Local Government (Samgöngu- og sveitarstjórnarráðuneytið)	S
Össur Skarphéðinsson	Minister for Foreign Affairs (Utanríkisráðherra)	Ministry for Foreign Affairs (Utanríkisráðuneytið)	S
Ragna Árnadóttir	Minister of Justice and Human Rights (Dómsmála- og mannréttindaráðherra)	Ministry of Justice and Human Rights (Dómsmála- og mannréttindaráðuneytið)	Independent
Steingrímur J. Sigfússon	Minister of Finance (Fjármálaráðherra)	Ministry of Finance (Fjármálaráðuneytið)	V
Svandís Svavarsdóttir	Minister for the Environment (Umhverfisráðherra)	Ministry for the Environment (Umhverfisráðuneytið)	V

=== Second reshuffle: 2 September 2010 – 31 December 2011 ===
Guðbjartur Hannesson replaced Álfheiður Ingadóttir as Minister of Health and Árni Páll Árnason as Minister of Social Affairs and Social Security. Ögmundur Jónasson replaced Kristján L. Möller as Minister of Transport, Communications and Local Government and Ragna Árnadóttir as Minister of Justice and Human Rights.

Incumbent	Minister	Ministry	Party
Jóhanna Sigurðardóttir	Prime Minister (Forsætisráðherra)	Prime Minister's Office (Forsætisráðuneytið)	S
Árni Páll Árnason	Minister of Economic Affairs (Efnahags- og viðskiptaráðherra)	Ministry of Economic Affairs (Efnahags- og viðskiptaráðuneytið)	S
Guðbjartur Hannesson	Minister of Health (Heilbrigðisráðherra)	Ministry of Health (Heilbrigðisráðuneytið)	S
Guðbjartur Hannesson	Minister of Social Affairs and Social Security (Félags- og tryggingamálaráðherra)	Ministry of Social Affairs and Social Security (Félags- og tryggingamálaráðuneytið)	S
Jón Bjarnason	Minister of Fisheries and Agriculture (Sjávarútvegs- og landbúnaðarráðherra)	Ministry of Fisheries and Agriculture (Sjávarútvegs- og landbúnaðarráðuneytið)	V
Katrín Jakobsdóttir	Minister of Education, Science and Culture (Mennta- og menningarmálaráðherra)	Ministry of Education, Science and Culture (Mennta- og menningarmálaráðuneytið)	V
Katrín Júlíusdóttir	Minister of Industry, Energy and Tourism (Iðnaðarráðherra)	Ministry of Industry, Energy and Tourism (Iðnaðarráðuneytið)	S
Ögmundur Jónasson	Minister of Justice and Human Rights (Dómsmála- og mannréttindaráðherra)	Ministry of Justice and Human Rights (Dómsmála- og mannréttindaráðuneytið)	V
Ögmundur Jónasson	Minister of Transport, Communications and Local Government (Samgöngu- og sveitarstjórnarráðherra)	Ministry of Transport, Communications and Local Government (Samgöngu- og sveitarstjórnarráðuneytið)	V
Össur Skarphéðinsson	Minister for Foreign Affairs (Utanríkisráðherra)	Ministry for Foreign Affairs (Utanríkisráðuneytið)	S
Steingrímur J. Sigfússon	Minister of Finance (Fjármálaráðherra)	Ministry of Finance (Fjármálaráðuneytið)	V
Svandís Svavarsdóttir	Minister for the Environment (Umhverfisráðherra)	Ministry for the Environment (Umhverfisráðuneytið)	V

=== Third reshuffle: 31 December 2011 – 23 May 2013 ===
Oddný Guðbjörg Harðardóttir replaced Steingrímur J. Sigfússon as Minister of Finance. Steingrímur J. Sigfússon replaced Árni Páll Árnason as Minister of Economic Affairs and Jón Bjarnason as Minister of Fisheries and Agriculture.

Incumbent	Minister	Ministry	Party
Jóhanna Sigurðardóttir	Prime Minister (Forsætisráðherra)	Prime Minister's Office (Forsætisráðuneytið)	S
Guðbjartur Hannesson	Minister of Health (Heilbrigðisráðherra)	Ministry of Health (Heilbrigðisráðuneytið)	S
Guðbjartur Hannesson	Minister of Social Affairs and Social Security (Félags- og tryggingamálaráðherra)	Ministry of Social Affairs and Social Security (Félags- og tryggingamálaráðuneytið)	S
Katrín Jakobsdóttir	Minister of Education, Science and Culture (Mennta- og menningarmálaráðherra)	Ministry of Education, Science and Culture (Mennta- og menningarmálaráðuneytið)	V
Katrín Júlíusdóttir	Minister of Industry, Energy and Tourism (Iðnaðarráðherra)	Ministry of Industry, Energy and Tourism (Iðnaðarráðuneytið)	S
Oddný Guðbjörg Harðardóttir	Minister of Finance (Fjármálaráðherra)	Ministry of Finance (Fjármálaráðuneytið)	S
Ögmundur Jónasson	Minister of Justice and Human Rights (Dómsmála- og mannréttindaráðherra)	Ministry of Justice and Human Rights (Dómsmála- og mannréttindaráðuneytið)	V
Ögmundur Jónasson	Minister of Transport, Communications and Local Government (Samgöngu- og sveitarstjórnarráðherra)	Ministry of Transport, Communications and Local Government (Samgöngu- og sveitarstjórnarráðuneytið)	V
Össur Skarphéðinsson	Minister for Foreign Affairs (Utanríkisráðherra)	Ministry for Foreign Affairs (Utanríkisráðuneytið)	S
Steingrímur J. Sigfússon	Minister of Economic Affairs (Efnahags- og viðskiptaráðherra)	Ministry of Economic Affairs (Efnahags- og viðskiptaráðuneytið)	V
Steingrímur J. Sigfússon	Minister of Fisheries and Agriculture (Sjávarútvegs- og landbúnaðarráðherra)	Ministry of Fisheries and Agriculture (Sjávarútvegs- og landbúnaðarráðuneytið)	V
Svandís Svavarsdóttir	Minister for the Environment (Umhverfisráðherra)	Ministry for the Environment (Umhverfisráðuneytið)	V

==== Change: 1 January 2011 ====
The Ministry of Justice and Human Rights and the Ministry of Transport, Communications and Local Government merged to form the Ministry of the Interior (Innanríkisráðuneytið). The Ministry of Health and the Ministry of Social Affairs and Social Security merged to form the Ministry of Welfare (Velferðarráðuneytið).

==== Change: 1 September 2012 ====
The Ministry of Fisheries and Agriculture, the Ministry of Industry, Energy and Tourism and part of the Ministry of Economic Affairs merged to form the Ministry of Industries and Innovation (Atvinnuvega- og nýsköpunarráðuneytið), led by Steingrímur J. Sigfússon. The Ministry for the Environment was renamed Ministry for the Environment and Natural Resources (Umhverfis- og auðlindaráðuneytið) and the Ministry of Finance and part of the Ministry of Economic Affairs merged to form the Ministry of Finance and Economic Affairs (Fjármála- og efnahagsráðuneytið), led by Oddný Guðbjörg Harðardóttir.

== See also ==
- Government of Iceland
- Cabinet of Iceland
