= Cabinet of Katrín Jakobsdóttir =

Cabinet of Katrín Jakobsdóttir may refer to:

- First cabinet of Katrín Jakobsdóttir formed 30 November 2017 dissolved 28 November 2021
- Second cabinet of Katrín Jakobsdóttir formed 28 November 2021 dissolved 9 April 2024
