= Minister of Education and Children's Affairs (Iceland) =

The Minister of Education and Cultural Affairs (Icelandic: Mennta- og menningarmálaráðherra) is the head of the Ministry of Education, Science and Culture. The current Minister of Education and Children's Affairs is Guðmundur Ingi Kristinsson.

== List of ministers ==
=== Minister of Education (16 December 1942 – 1 January 1970) ===
| Nº | Minister | Took office | Left office | Duration | Party | Cabinet |
|---|---|---|---|---|---|---|
| 1 | Einar Arnórsson (1880–1955) | 16 December 1942 | 21 September 1944 | 1 year, 9 months, 5 days (645 days) | IP | Björn Þórðarson |
| 2 | Björn Þórðarson (1879–1963) | 21 September 1944 | 21 October 1944 | 1 month (30 days) | N/A | Björn Þórðarson |
| 3 | Brynjólfur Bjarnason (1898–1989) | 21 October 1944 | 4 February 1947 | 2 years, 3 months, 14 days (836 days) | PUP | Ólafur Thors II |
| 4 | Eysteinn Jónsson (1906–1993) | 4 February 1947 | 6 December 1949 | 2 years, 10 months, 2 days (1,036 days) | PP | Stefán Jóhann Stefánsson |
| 5 | Bjarni Benediktsson (1908–1970) | 6 December 1949 | 14 March 1950 | 3 months, 8 days (98 days) | IP | Ólafur Thors III |
| 6 | Björn Ólafsson (1895–1974) | 14 March 1950 | 11 September 1953 | 3 years, 5 months, 28 days (1,277 days) | IP | Steingrímur Steinþórsson |
| (5) | Bjarni Benediktsson (1908–1970) | 11 September 1953 | 24 July 1956 | 2 years, 10 months, 13 days (1047 days) | IP | Ólafur Thors IV |
| 7 | Gylfi Þorsteinsson Gíslason (1917–2004) | 24 July 1956 | — | — | SDP | Hermann Jónasson V |
| 7 | Gylfi Þorsteinsson Gíslason (1917–2004) | 24 July 1956 | — | — | SDP | Emil Jónsson |
| 7 | Gylfi Þorsteinsson Gíslason (1917–2004) | 24 July 1956 | — | — | SDP | Ólafur Thors V |
| 7 | Gylfi Þorsteinsson Gíslason (1917–2004) | 24 July 1956 | — | — | SDP | Bjarni Benediktsson |

=== Minister of Education, Science and Culture (1 January 1970 – 28 November 2021) ===
The Cabinet of Iceland Act no. 73/1969, which had been passed by the parliament 28 May 1969, took effect on 1 January 1970. Thus the Cabinet was formally established along with its ministries which had up until then not formally existed separately from the ministers.

| Nº | Minister | Took office | Left office | Duration | Party | Cabinet |
|---|---|---|---|---|---|---|
| (7) | Gylfi Þorsteinsson Gíslason (1917–2004) | — | 14 July 1971 | 14 years, 11 months, 20 days (5,468 days) | SDP | Bjarni Benediktsson |
| (7) | Gylfi Þorsteinsson Gíslason (1917–2004) | — | 14 July 1971 | 14 years, 11 months, 20 days (5,468 days) | SDP | Jóhann Hafstein |
| 8 | Magnús Torfi Ólafsson (1923–1998) | 14 July 1971 | 28 August 1974 | 3 years, 1 month, 14 days (1,141 days) | ULL | Ólafur Jóhannesson I |
| 9 | Vilhjálmur Hjálmarsson (1914–2014) | 28 August 1974 | 1 September 1978 | 4 years, 4 days (1,465 days) | PP | Geir Hallgrímsson |
| 10 | Ragnar Arnalds (1938–2022) | 1 September 1978 | 15 October 1979 | 1 year, 1 month, 14 days (409 days) | PA | Ólafur Jóhannesson II |
| 11 | Vilmundur Gylfason (1948–1983) | 15 October 1979 | 8 February 1980 | 3 months, 24 days (116 days) | SDP | Benedikt Gröndal |
| 12 | Ingvar Gíslason (1926–2022) | 8 February 1980 | 26 May 1983 | 3 years, 3 months, 18 days (1,203 days) | PP | Gunnar Thoroddsen |
| 13 | Ragnhildur Helgadóttir (1930–2016) | 26 May 1983 | 16 October 1985 | 2 years, 4 months, 20 days (874 days) | IP | Steingrímur Hermannsson I |
| 14 | Sverrir Hermannsson (1930–2018) | 16 October 1985 | 8 July 1987 | 1 year, 8 months, 22 days (630 days) | IP | Steingrímur Hermannsson I |
| 15 | Birgir Ísleifur Gunnarsson (1936–2019) | 8 July 1987 | 28 September 1988 | 1 year, 2 months, 20 days (448 days) | IP | Þorsteinn Pálsson |
| 16 | Svavar Gestsson (1944–2021) | 28 September 1988 | 30 April 1991 | 2 years, 7 months, 2 days (944 days) | PA | Steingrímur Hermannsson II |
| 16 | Svavar Gestsson (1944–2021) | 28 September 1988 | 30 April 1991 | 2 years, 7 months, 2 days (944 days) | PA | Steingrímur Hermannsson III |
| 17 | Ólafur Garðar Einarsson (1932–2023) | 30 April 1991 | 23 April 1995 | 3 years, 11 months, 24 days (1,454 days) | IP | Davíð Oddsson I |
| 18 | Björn Bjarnason (1944–) | 23 April 1995 | 2 March 2002 | 6 years, 10 months, 7 days (2,505 days) | IP | Davíð Oddsson II |
| 18 | Björn Bjarnason (1944–) | 23 April 1995 | 2 March 2002 | 6 years, 10 months, 7 days (2,505 days) | IP | Davíð Oddsson III |
| 19 | Tómas Ingi Olrich (1943–) | 2 March 2002 | 31 December 2003 | 1 year, 9 months, 29 days (669 days) | IP | Davíð Oddsson III |
| 19 | Tómas Ingi Olrich (1943–) | 2 March 2002 | 31 December 2003 | 1 year, 9 months, 29 days (669 days) | IP | Davíð Oddsson IV |
| 20 | Þorgerður Katrín Gunnarsdóttir (1965–) | 31 December 2003 | 1 February 2009 | 5 years, 1 month, 1 day (1,859 days) | IP | Davíð Oddsson IV |
| 20 | Þorgerður Katrín Gunnarsdóttir (1965–) | 31 December 2003 | 1 February 2009 | 5 years, 1 month, 1 day (1,859 days) | IP | Halldór Ásgrímsson |
| 20 | Þorgerður Katrín Gunnarsdóttir (1965–) | 31 December 2003 | 1 February 2009 | 5 years, 1 month, 1 day (1,859 days) | IP | Geir Haarde I |
| 20 | Þorgerður Katrín Gunnarsdóttir (1965–) | 31 December 2003 | 1 February 2009 | 5 years, 1 month, 1 day (1,859 days) | IP | Geir Haarde II |
| 21 | Katrín Jakobsdóttir (1976–) | 1 February 2009 | 23 May 2013 | 4 years, 3 months, 22 days (1,572 days) | LG | Jóhanna Sigurðardóttir I |
| 21 | Katrín Jakobsdóttir (1976–) | 1 February 2009 | 23 May 2013 | 4 years, 3 months, 22 days (1,572 days) | LG | Jóhanna Sigurðardóttir II |
| 22 | Illugi Gunnarsson (1967–) | 23 May 2013 | 30 November 2017 | 3 years, 7 months, 19 days (1,329 days) | IP | Sigmundur Davíð Gunnlaugsson |
| 22 | Illugi Gunnarsson (1967–) | 23 May 2013 | 30 November 2017 | 3 years, 7 months, 19 days (1,329 days) | IP | Sigurður Ingi Jóhannsson |
| 23 | Kristján Þór Júlíusson (1957–) | 11 January 2017 | 30 November 2017 | 10 months, 19 day (323 days) | IP | Bjarni Benediktsson |
| 24 | Lilja Dögg Alfreðsdóttir (1973–) | 30 November 2017 | 28 November 2021 | 3 years, 11 months, 29 days (1459 days) | PP | Katrín Jakobsdóttir I |

=== Minister of Education and Children's Affairs (28 November 2021 – present) ===
| Nº | Minister | Took office | Left office | Duration | Party | Cabinet |
|---|---|---|---|---|---|---|
| 25 | Ásmundur Einar Daðason (1982–) | 28 November 2021 | 21 December 2024 | 3 years, 23 days (1119 days) | PP | Katrín Jakobsdóttir II |
| 25 | Ásmundur Einar Daðason (1982–) | 28 November 2021 | 21 December 2024 | 3 years, 23 days (1119 days) | PP | Bjarni Benediktsson II |
| 26 | Ásthildur Lóa Þórsdóttir (1966–) | 21 December 2024 | 20 March 2025 | 92 days | PP | Kristrún Frostadóttir |
| 27 | Guðmundur Ingi Kristinsson (1955–) | 23 March 2025 | 11 January 2026 | 294 days | PP | Kristrún Frostadóttir |
| 28 | Inga Sæland (1959–) | 11 January 2026 | Incumbent | 83 days | PP | Kristrún Frostadóttir |
