= 2017 Icelandic parliamentary election =

- 28 October 2017
- All 63 seats in the Althing; 32 seats needed for a majority
- Turnout: 81.20%
Party	Leader	Vote %	Seats	+/–
Independence	Bjarni Benediktsson	25.25	16	−5
Left-Green	Katrín Jakobsdóttir	16.89	11	+1
Social Democratic	Logi Már Einarsson	12.05	7	+4
Centre	Sigmundur Davíð Gunnlaugsson	10.89	7	New
Progressive	Sigurður Ingi Jóhannsson	10.71	8	0
Pirates	Collective leadership (Note: The Pirate Party rejects the regular leadership model. Their formal chairperson of the parliamentary group for the 2017-18 period was Halldóra Mogensen)	9.20	6	−4
People's	Inga Sæland	6.88	4	+4
Viðreisn	Þorgerður Katrín Gunnarsdóttir	6.69	4	−3
This lists parties that won seats. See the complete results below.
Results by constituency
Prime Minister before	Prime Minister after
Bjarni Benediktsson; Independence	Katrín Jakobsdóttir; Left-Green

Early parliamentary elections were held in Iceland on 28 October 2017. On 15 September 2017, the three-party coalition government collapsed after the departure of Bright Future over a scandal involving Prime Minister Bjarni Benediktsson's father writing a letter recommending a convicted child sex offender have his "honour restored". Bjarni subsequently called for a snap election, which was officially scheduled for 28 October 2017 following the dissolution of the Althing.

Though many opinion polls in the run-up to the election indicated an increase in support for the Left-Green Movement, the Independence Party retained its position as the Althing's largest party. Following the election, four-party coalition talks led by the Left-Greens ensued; however, after the Progressive Party rejected the possibility, a three-party coalition led by the Left-Greens including the Independence Party and Progressive Party was negotiated. After formally receiving the mandate to form a coalition on 28 November, Left-Green leader Katrín Jakobsdóttir was designated Prime Minister to lead the new government on 30 November.

== Background ==
A three-party coalition of the Independence Party, Viðreisn and Bright Future had been put together after the 2016 election; it held a narrow majority of one seat in Parliament. The cabinet formed was led by Prime Minister Bjarni Benediktsson, head of the Independence Party.

The Icelandic legal system has a mechanism whereby a convicted individual can have their "honour restored", that is have certain civil rights restored, from five years after serving their sentence if three letters of recommendation from persons of good character who know the individual are provided. Hjalti Sigurjón Hauksson was convicted in 2004 for multiple rapes of his stepdaughter from age five for twelve years. He served a jail term of five and a half years. Bjarni's father, Benedikt Sveinsson, was a friend of Hjalti Sigurjón's. Benedikt signed a letter of recommendation, which he said Hjalti Sigurjón brought to him already drafted. Bjarni was informed of this in July 2017 by the justice minister, Sigríður Á. Andersen, also of the Independence Party, but Benedikt's support was not revealed by the government at first. At first Sigríður refused to say in public who had signed the letter, but she was ordered to do so by a Parliamentary committee. Bjarni said it would have been illegal for him to reveal the information earlier.

Benedikt's involvement emerged in September. Bright Future left the coalition, accusing the Independence Party of a "serious breach of trust". Benedikt apologised for signing the letter. Sigríður said she was preparing a bill to reform the restored honour system.

Bjarni acknowledged the need for new elections, although the decision is made by the President, Guðni Thorlacius Jóhannesson. Other parties supported new elections, although Birgitta Jónsdóttir, parliamentary chair of the Pirates, initially suggested a five-party coalition government of the Pirate Party, Viðreisn, the Left-Greens, the Social Democrats and Bright Future should be explored. There had been unsuccessful discussions about such a coalition after the previous election.

According to a poll conducted by Morgunblaðið, 57% of Icelanders believed calling the snap election was right.

== Candidates and campaign ==
The Pirate Party reject a traditional model of party leadership, but Birgitta Jónsdóttir co-founded the party and is often described as the party's informal leader. She announced that she would not be standing in the election. After Birgitta announced that she was not standing, Helgi Hrafn Gunnarsson announced that he would now be running to be an MP, having earlier quit due to what he described as bullying by Birgitta. The centre-right Independence and Reform Parties both campaigned on a platform of continuing their governmental efforts and retaining power in the Althing, as both parties were in coalition before the collapse of the previous parliament. Meanwhile, the Left-Green Movement sought an opportunity to govern for the first time since 2009 and implement ideologically leftist policies.

Former Progressive Party Prime Minister Sigmundur Davíð Gunnlaugsson announced in an open letter that he planned to create a party before the elections. This decision was triggered by a leadership dispute amongst the Progressive Party, and led to the formation of the Centre Party on 24 September. The party's platform was broadly similar to that of its predecessor, but was characterised by observers in the media as being "populist", with a particular emphasis on reform of the banking sector and firms such as Íslandsbanki.

== Electoral system ==
The 63 members of the Althing were elected using open list proportional representation in six multi-member constituencies. Voters could change the ranking of candidates or cross their names out completely. Of the 63 seats, 54 are elected using constituency results and determined using the d'Hondt method. The remaining nine supplementary seats are awarded to parties that crossed the 5% national electoral threshold in order to give them a total number of seats equivalent to their national share of the vote.

== Participating parties ==
=== Parties with a list for all constituencies ===
Name	List letter	Leader	Ideology		2016 result	
Name	List letter	Leader	Ideology		%	Seats
Independence Party; Sjálfstæðisflokkurinn	D	Bjarni Benediktsson	Conservatism; Liberal conservatism Economic liberalism	Centre-right to right-wing	29.0%	21 / 63
Left-Green Movement; Vinstrihreyfingin – grænt framboð	V	Katrín Jakobsdóttir	Democratic socialism Eco-socialism; Feminism	Centre-left to left-wing	15.9%	10 / 63
Pirate Party; Píratar	P	Collective leadership	Pirate politics Direct democracy Transparency	Syncretic	14.5%	10 / 63
Progressive Party; Framsóknarflokkurinn	B	Sigurður Ingi Jóhannsson	Populism; Agrarianism; Liberalism	Centre to centre-right	11.5%	8 / 63
Viðreisn	C	Þorgerður Katrín Gunnarsdóttir	Liberalism; Economic liberalism Green liberalism	Centre to centre-right	10.5%	7 / 63
Bright Future; Björt framtíð	A	Óttarr Proppé	Liberalism; Social liberalism Green liberalism	Centre	7.2%	4 / 63
Social Democratic Alliance; Samfylkingin jafnaðarmannaflokkur Íslands	S	Logi Már Einarsson	Social democracy Feminism; Pro-Europeanism	Centre-left	5.7%	3 / 63
People's Party; Flokkur fólksins	F	Inga Sæland	Socialism; Populism; Disability rights	Centre-left to left-wing	Did not exist	
Centre Party; Miðflokkurinn	M	Sigmundur Davíð Gunnlaugsson	Centrism; Populism; Nordic agrarianism	Centre-right	Did not exist	

=== Parties with a list for only some constituencies ===
Name	List letter	Leader	Ideology		2016 result	
Name	List letter	Leader	Ideology		%	Seats
People's Front of Iceland; Alþýðufylkingin	R	Þorvaldur Þorvaldsson	Anti-capitalism; Environmentalism; Hard Euroscepticism	Far-left	0.3%	0 / 63
Dawn; Dögun - stjórnmálasamtök um réttlæti, sanngirni og lýðræði	T	Board of directors			1.7%	0 / 63

The Icelandic National Front (right-wing/far-right) was going to take part in the election with list letter E, but has since withdrawn all its lists.

== Opinion polls ==

Poll source	Fieldwork date	Sample size	D	V	P	B	C	A	S	F	M	Others	Lead
2017 election	28 Oct 2017	–	25.2	16.9	9.2	10.7	6.7	1.2	12.1	6.9	10.9	0.2	8.4
MMR	26–27 Oct 2017	980	21.3	16.6	11.0	11.7	8.1	2.2	12.5	4.4	11.4	0.9	4.7
Gallup	23–27 Oct 2017	3,848	25.3	17.3	9.0	8.9	8.2	1.5	15.5	4.0	9.7	0.6	8.0
Zenter	23–27 Oct 2017	962	22.5	19.6	9.6	9.6	7.1	1.9	14.7	4.3	10.2	0.7	2.9
Háskóli Íslands	22–25 Oct 2017	2,283	24.5	20.2	8.8	7.9	8.3	1.3	15.3	4.2	9.3	0.2	4.6
Fréttablaðið	23–24 Oct 2017	1,602	24.1	19.2	9.4	6.2	7.5	1.9	14.3	4.4	9.6	3.4	4.9
MMR	20–23 Oct 2017	979	22.9	19.9	9.3	8.6	5.5	1.8	13.5	4.7	12.3	1.3	3.0
Háskóli Íslands	16–19 Oct 2017	2,395	25.1	23.2	8.2	7.1	5.7	1.5	15.6	3.3	9.8	0.5	1.9
Gallup	13–19 Oct 2017	2,870	22.6	23.3	10.7	7.4	5.8	1.2	13.3	5.7	9.4	0.5	0.7
MMR	17–18 Oct 2017	1,007	19.9	19.1	11.9	8.0	6.7	1.6	15.8	5.3	11.0	0.8	0.8
Fréttablaðið	16 Oct 2017	806	22.2	27.0	10.0	7.5	5.0	2.1	10.4	3.7	10.7	1.4	4.8
Háskóli Íslands	9–12 Oct 2017	1,250	22.6	27.4	9.2	5.5	3.4	2.6	15.3	6.5	6.4	1.1	4.8
Gallup	29 Sep–12 Oct 2017	3,876	23.7	23.0	8.8	7.2	4.8	3.0	13.4	5.7	9.5	0.9	0.7
MMR	6–11 Oct 2017	966	21.1	21.8	10.5	5.9	3.6	4.2	13.0	7.4	10.7	1.8	0.7
Fréttablaðið	10 Oct 2017	804	22.2	29.9	8.5	7.1	3.3	3.6	8.3	6.1	9.2	1.8	7.7
Háskóli Íslands	2–6 Oct 2017	1,083	20.7	28.2	9.1	5.5	3.1	2.7	10.8	9.0	9.5	1.4	7.5
Fréttablaðið	2–3 Oct 2017	800	22.3	28.6	11.4	5.5	3.0	2.6	10.6	5.8	8.9	1.4	6.3
MMR	26–28 Sep 2017	1,012	23.5	24.7	10.0	6.4	4.9	2.5	10.4	8.5	7.3	1.7	1.2
Háskóli Íslands	25–28 Sep 2017	952	24.3	28.8	11.6	7.0	4.8	4.3	7.5	6.5	4.6	0.6	4.5
Gallup	15–28 Sep 2017	4,092	23.1	25.4	10.3	9.9	3.6	4.6	9.3	10.1	2.0	1.6	2.3
Háskóli Íslands	19–21 Sep 2017	908	23	30	10	11	6	3	8	9	–	0	7
Fréttablaðið	18 Sep 2017	800	23.0	22.8	13.7	10.4	5.2	7.1	5.1	10.9	–	1.8	0.2
Zenter	15–18 Sep 2017	956	26.4	22.8	12.5	10.5	2.7	5.6	9.0	9.8	–	0.8	3.6
Gallup	14 Sep 2017	—N/a	23.6	24.4	9.8	10.4	5.2	4.4	9.1	11.6	–	1.5	0.8
MMR	4 Sep 2017	—N/a	25.9	19.2	13.8	9.7	7.3	3.0	9.6	9.1	–	2.4	6.7
Gallup	10–30 Aug 2017	4,108	26.3	19.5	13.1	10.8	4.8	2.8	9.7	10.6	–	2.4	6.8
MMR	15–18 Aug 2017	955	24.5	20.5	13.5	10.1	6.0	3.6	10.6	6.7	–	4.5	4.0
Gallup	12–31 Jul 2017	3,827	26.5	21.2	12.9	11.4	5.3	3.7	9.1	8.4	–	1.5	5.3
MMR	18–21 Jul 2017	909	29.3	20.4	13.3	9.6	4.6	2.4	10.6	6.1	–	3.6	8.9
Gallup	15 Jun–2 Jul 2017	2,870	27.5	21.5	14.2	11.3	5.6	3.3	9.2	3.8	–	3.6	6.0
MMR	21 Jun 2017	—N/a	28.4	22.6	13.3	10.2	5.3	3.3	9.1	2.8	–	5.0	5.8
MMR	6–14 Jun 2017	974	24.9	20.6	13.7	13.4	5.2	2.9	11.3	2.8	–	5.2	4.3
Gallup	3–31 May 2017	7,133	25.6	24.3	12.9	11.0	6.2	3.4	9.4	4.2	–	3.0	1.3
MMR	11–16 May 2017	943	25.6	21.4	14.1	12.2	5.5	3.4	9.3	3.6	–	5.0	4.2
Gallup	30 Mar–1 May 2017	8,206	26.4	24.0	13.1	10.9	6.9	4.4	8.3	3.7	–	3.3	2.4
MMR	11–26 Apr 2017	926	25.2	23.4	12.8	11.1	5.0	3.2	10.6	3.2	–	5.4	1.8
Gallup	2–30 Mar 2017	5,798	29.2	24.5	10.3	10.5	6.0	6.0	8.3	2.8	–	2.4	4.7
Fréttablaðið	20–21 Mar 2017	791	32.1	27.3	14.3	7.0	3.1	3.8	8.8	–	–	3.6	4.8
MMR	6–13 Mar 2017	921	25.4	23.5	13.7	11.4	5.5	5.0	8.8	3.7	–	3.0	1.9
Gallup	1–28 Feb 2017	5,557	27.6	24.3	12.0	10.7	5.4	6.4	8.3	2.4	–	2.9	3.3
MMR	17–24 Feb 2017	928	26.9	23.9	11.6	12.2	6.3	5.2	8.0	2.5	–	3.4	3.3
MMR	10–15 Feb 2017	983	24.4	27.0	11.9	10.7	6.2	5.4	10.0	2.6	–	1.8	2.6
MMR	1–5 Feb 2017	983	23.8	27.0	13.6	9.7	5.6	5.3	7.8	3.6	–	3.6	3.2
Gallup	5–29 Jan 2017	4,288	28.0	22.8	13.4	10.5	5.3	7.2	7.3	3.3	–	2.2	5.2
MMR	12–26 Jan 2017	910	24.6	22.0	13.6	12.5	6.8	7.0	7.0	3.6	–	2.9	2.6
MMR	3–10 Jan 2017	954	26.1	24.3	14.6	10.9	6.9	6.3	6.4	2.1	–	2.4	1.8
Gallup	1–29 Dec 2016	4,192	29.0	20.0	14.6	8.9	7.4	8.7	7.5	2.2	–	1.7	9.0
MMR	26 Dec 2016	—N/a	29.3	20.7	12.7	10.2	7.0	9.1	6.9	2.2	–	1.9	8.6
MMR	14 Dec 2016	—N/a	29.6	21.6	14.1	9.1	5.6	8.9	6.3	1.6	–	3.2	8.0
Fréttablaðið	12–14 Dec 2016	791	31.8	17.0	13.1	9.7	10.1	10.8	5.6	–	–	1.9	14.8
MMR	1 Dec 2016	—N/a	26.1	20.5	15.6	8.0	7.8	9.8	6.6	1.9	–	3.7	5.6
Gallup	10–29 Nov 2016	5,207	28.0	20.9	13.7	9.0	8.9	8.6	5.3	3.0	–	2.6	7.1
MMR	7–14 Nov 2016	904	26.0	20.7	11.9	9.4	10.6	9.6	5.6	3.4	–	2.8	5.3
2016 election	29 Oct 2016	–	29.0	15.9	14.5	11.5	10.5	7.2	5.7	3.5	–	2.2	13.1

If a sample size was not provided for the poll, only the given (Gallup) or end (MMR) date was provided by the polling firm.

== Results ==
The Independence Party retained its position as the Althing's largest party. However, the Independence Party's parliamentary representation decreased by five seats to 16 and it lost its governing majority. The Left-Green Movement retained its position as the Althing's second largest party, increasing its representation by one seat to 11. The Social Democratic Alliance saw a large increase in support, doubling its vote share from 2016, and entered the new parliament with seven members. The Progressive Party held steady at eight seats while the newly formed Centre Party, founded by former Progressive Prime Minister Sigmundur Davíð Gunnlaugsson, won seven seats. The Pirate Party, which entered the election as the Althing's third largest party, lost four seats and was reduced to six seats. Entering the Althing for the first time, the People's Party obtained four seats. Viðreisn, a member of the outgoing government, lost three seats and was left with four seats. In line with all pre-election polling, Bright Future did not meet the 5% threshold and was therefore not returned to the Althing.

Party	Votes	%	Seats	+/–
Independence Party	49,548	25.25	16	–5
Left-Green Movement	33,156	16.89	11	+1
Social Democratic Alliance	23,654	12.05	7	+4
Centre Party	21,337	10.87	7	New
Progressive Party	21,017	10.71	8	0
Pirate Party	18,053	9.20	6	–4
People's Party	13,502	6.88	4	+4
Viðreisn	13,122	6.69	4	–3
Bright Future	2,394	1.22	0	–4
People's Front of Iceland	375	0.19	0	0
Dawn	101	0.05	0	0
Total	196,259	100.00	63	0
Valid votes	196,259	97.26		
Invalid/blank votes	5,522	2.74		
Total votes	201,781	100.00		
Registered voters/turnout	248,485	81.20		
Source: Statistics Iceland

=== By constituency ===
Constituency	D	V	S	M	B	P	F	C
Reykjavík North	22.6	21.5	12.8	7.0	5.3	13.6	7.1	8.4
Reykjavík South	22.8	18.9	13.0	7.6	8.1	11.4	8.2	8.5
Southwest	30.9	13.6	12.1	9.5	7.9	8.3	6.5	9.5
Northwest	24.5	17.8	9.7	14.2	18.4	6.8	5.3	2.5
Northeast	20.3	19.9	13.9	18.6	14.3	5.5	4.3	2.1
South	25.2	11.8	9.6	14.3	18.6	7.1	8.9	3.1
Source: Statistics Iceland

== Government formation ==
=== Four-party coalition talks ===
On 30 October, President Guðni Th. Jóhannesson met with the leaders of the eight parliamentary parties. Before meeting with Guðni, Left-Green leader Katrín Jakobsdóttir stated that she wanted to become Prime Minister, and did not exclude the possibility of cooperation with any party. Þórhildur Sunna Ævarsdóttir, representing the Pirates, voiced her party's support for Katrín to receive the mandate to form a government, did not rule out an alliance with the Centre or People's Party, but indicated that it was not her first choice, and did not rule out an alliance with the Independence Party but did not envisage one to be possible. Inga Sæland said that the People's Party remained unbound, but alluded to the similarities between her party and Sigmundur Davíð Gunnlaugsson's Centre Party; however, though Sigmundur suggested that the two parties would ally to address shared issues, Inga stated she was not aware of any such alliance.

The four former opposition parties held informal talks, with their leaders meeting by chance on 30 October. Logi Már Einarsson, leader of the Social Democratic Alliance, told Guðni it was natural for Katrín to receive the mandate to form a government if she so requested. He did not rule out an alliance with the Independence Party, but said that the two parties were starkly different, adding that it was natural for the opposition to have the chance to lead given the government's losses in the election. The Progressive Party was in pole position to determine whether the Independence Party or the Left-Greens would lead the next government, and after the election reiterated its opposition to a referendum on EU membership. Progressive leader Sigurður Ingi Jóhannsson also expressed reluctance to governing with the Centre Party. After meeting with Guðni, Katrín declared that she wanted to form a government with the four former opposition parties, noting that though a coalition with additional parties would provide more than 32 seats, doing so would not be necessary before a four-party coalition was first attempted.

After holding talks with party leaders, President Guðni Th. Jóhannesson on 2 November granted Katrín Jakobsdóttir, leader of the Left-Green Movement, the mandate to form a coalition between her party, the Progressives, Social Democratic Alliance, and Pirates, the four having agreed in the morning to begin formal coalition talks, which started the following day. On 6 November, the leadership of the Progressive Party determined that the four-party coalition would hold too slim a majority to form the basis for cooperation between them on major issues, and the Pirates recommended in a press release that a government with a larger majority be formed; the early failure of negotiations was also attributed to the Progressives' distrust of the Pirates in supporting a government with such a slim majority. As such, Katrín met Guðni in the afternoon, after first announcing to the press that she would return her mandate. Guðni subsequently announced that he would discuss alternative possibilities to form a government with the party leaders, with speculation about a possible rapprochement between the Progressive Party and Centre Party sparked by a call between their chairmen over the weekend.

=== Three-party coalition talks ===
In the following days, the leaders of the Left-Greens, Independence Party, and Progressive Party discussed the possibility of forming a coalition together, with the Left-Greens insistent that Katrín become prime minister in that case, an idea supported by the Progressives; in exchange, demissionary prime minister Bjarni Benediktsson would be appointed finance minister. At a meeting of Left-Green parliamentarians on 13 November, 9 voted in support and 2 against opening formal talks with the Independence Party, the two opposed being Andrés Ingi Jónsson and Rósa Björk Brynjólfsdóttir. The youth organisation of the Left-Greens announced its vehement opposition to governing with the Independence Party, and dozens of the party's members renounced their membership in protest. The coalition is the first including the Independence Party and the farthest left party represented in the Althing since the period from 1944 to 1947, when it governed alongside the People's Unity Party – Socialist Party.

Talks concluded swiftly, and after meeting with Katrín on 28 November, Guðni formally granted her the mandate to lead a government with the Independence Party and Progressive Party, pending the support of each of the parties, with the new government seated on 30 November, after party committees approved the government agreement.
