= Minister of the Interior (Iceland) =

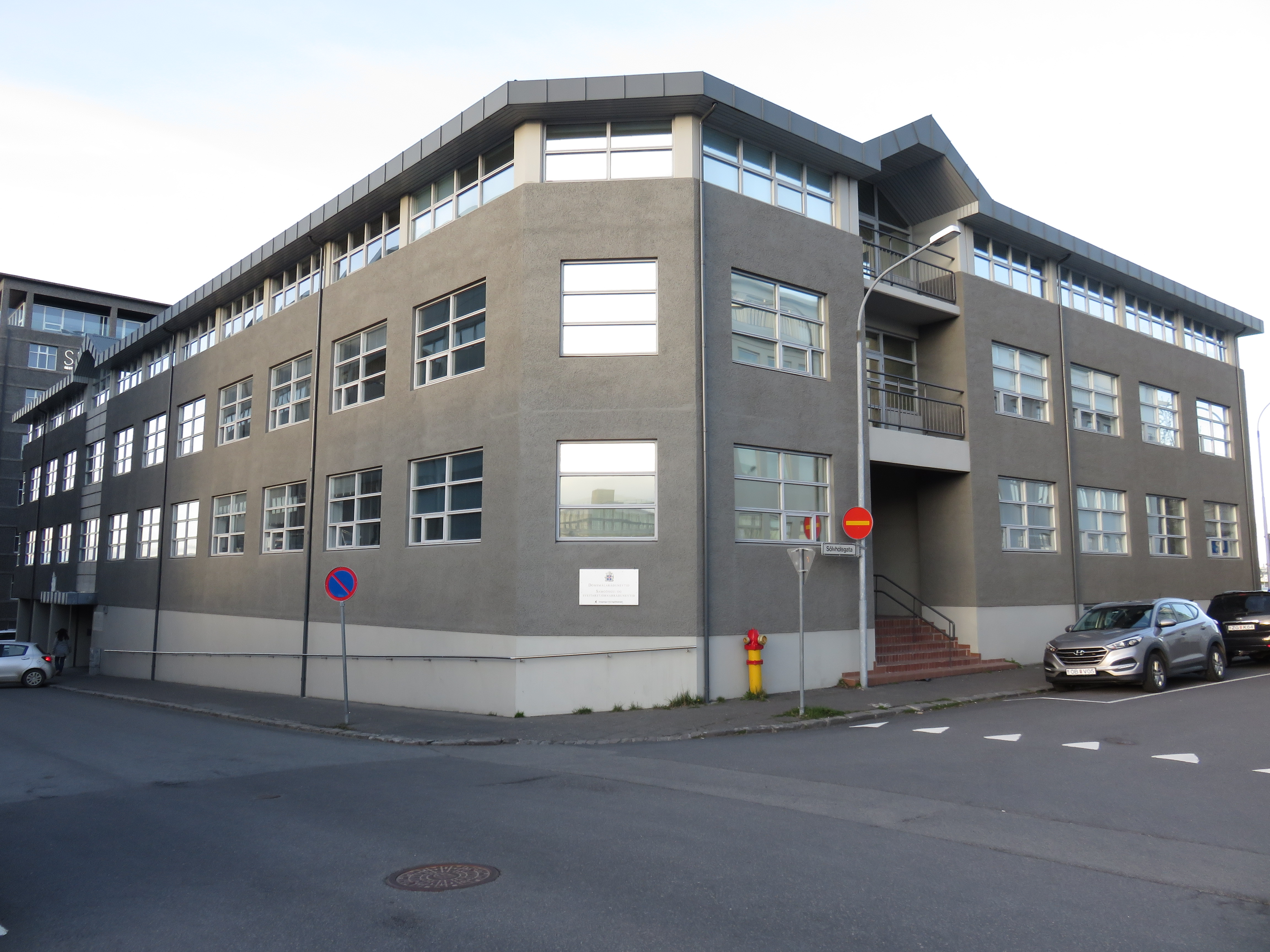
Ministry of Justice and Ministry of Transport and Local Government building in Reykjavík in 2018

The Minister of the Interior (Icelandic: Innanríkisráðherra) was the head of Iceland's Ministry of the Interior (Icelandic: Innanríkisráðuneyti Íslands) from 2011 to 2017.

The Ministry of the Interior was created on 1 January 2011 as the result of the merger of two ministries, those of Justice and Human Rights and Transport, Communications and Local Government.

In the cabinet of Bjarni Benediktsson, formed on 11 January 2017 following the 2016 parliamentary election, the Ministry of the Interior initially still existed as an umbrella ministry for two ministers, the Minister of Justice and the Minister of Transport and Local Government. On 1 May 2017, the Ministry of the Interior was formally dissolved and split into the two new ministries of Justice (Dómsmálaráðuneytið) and Transport and Local Government (Samgöngu- og sveitarstjórnarráðuneytið). For the time being, the two ministries will continue to operate a joint website at the address of the former Ministry of the Interior.

== List of ministers ==
=== Minister of the Interior (1 January 2011 – 11 January 2017) ===
| Nº | Minister | Took office | Left office | Duration | Party | Cabinet |
|---|---|---|---|---|---|---|
| 1 | Ögmundur Jónasson (1948–) | 1 January 2011 | 23 May 2013 | 2 years, 4 months, 22 days (873 days) | LGM | Jóhanna Sigurðardóttir II |
| 2 | Hanna Birna Kristjánsdóttir (1966–) | 23 May 2013 | 4 December 2014 | 1 years, 6 months, 11 days (560 days) | IP | Sigmundur Davíð Gunnlaugsson |
| 2 | Sigmundur Davíð Gunnlaugsson (1975–) Minister of Justice | 26 August 2014 | 4 December 2014 | 3 months, 8 days (100 days) | PP | Sigmundur Davíð Gunnlaugsson |
| 3 | Ólöf Nordal (1966–2017) | 4 December 2014 | 11 January 2017 | 2 years, 38 days (769 days) | IP | Sigmundur Davíð Gunnlaugsson |
| 3 | Ólöf Nordal (1966–2017) | 4 December 2014 | 11 January 2017 | 2 years, 38 days (769 days) | IP | Sigurður Ingi Jóhannsson |
