= Sigrún Magnúsdóttir =

Icelandic politician (born 1944)

Minister for the Environment and Natural Resources
- In office 31 December 2014 – 11 January 2017
- Prime Minister: Sigmundur Davíð Gunnlaugsson; Sigurður Ingi Jóhannsson
- Preceded by: Sigurður Ingi Jóhannsson
- Succeeded by: Björt Ólafsdóttir

Personal details
- Born: 15 June 1944 (age 81)
- Party: Progressive Party

Sigrún Magnúsdóttir (born 15 June 1944) is an Icelandic politician and a former cabinet member. She represented the Reykjavík North Constituency in the Althingi from 2013 until 2016.

== Minister for the Environment ==
At the end of 2014 she was appointed Minister for the Environment and Natural Resources. The post had previously been held by Sigurður Ingi Jóhannsson (who combined it with Fisheries and Agriculture). It was reassigned in the third reshuffle of the Cabinet of Sigmundur Davíð Gunnlaugsson.

Following the 2016 Icelandic parliamentary election (in which she did not stand) a new government was formed. In January 2017 she was succeeded as environment minister by Björt Ólafsdóttir in the Cabinet of Bjarni Benediktsson.

== External sources ==
- Wikivitnun (Wikiquote)
- CV at www.althingi.is
