= Althing Ombudsman =

The Umboðsmaður Alþingis (Icelandic for, literally, "Ombudsman [of the] Parliament") is an ombudsman appointed by the Alþingi (the Parliament of Iceland) to oversee investigation of complaints against local government and government departments in Iceland.

The post of Umboðsmaður Alþingis was established from January 1, 1988, by the decree of law 13/1987. In 1997, by the decree of law 85/1997, its remit was extended to local government. From the start, Gaukur Jörundsson was elected by the Althing as the umboðsmaður. He was reelected twice, the last time with a mandate to December 31, 1999; but resigned from November 1, 1998. Tryggvi Gunnarsson took his place, first temporarily selected for the rest of Jörundsson's mandate, and then formally elected for the next period, and then reelected five times for full periods. However, he retired at his own request in the middle of the last one, which was effective from 1 May 2021. He also has had to take leave from his office for three shorter periods, when he was engaged in other matters, as in the special investigation commission for the causes of the 2008–2011 Icelandic financial crisis. Thus, Róbert Ragnar Spanó served as Umboðsmaður Alþingis ad hoc 2009–2013.

In April 2021 the Althing elected Skúli Magnússon as new Ombudsman for a full period, starting 1 May 2021.
