= Ragnheiður Elín Árnadóttir =

Icelandic politician (born 1967)

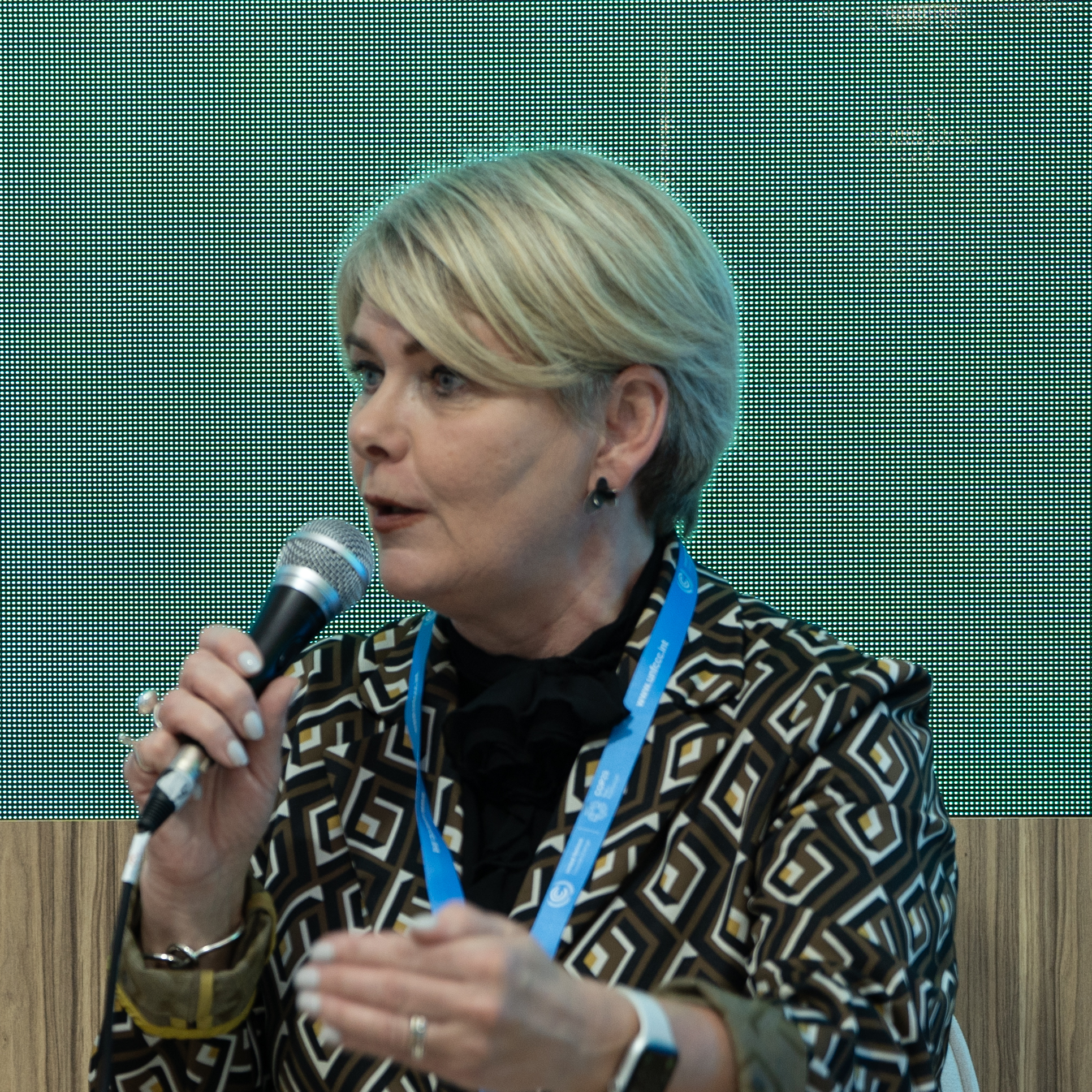
- in 2024

Minister for Industry and Commerce
- In office 23 May 2013 – 11 January 2017
- Prime Minister: Sigmundur Davíð Gunnlaugsson
- Preceded by: Katrín Júlíusdóttir

Personal details
- Born: 30 September 1967 (age 58) Keflavík, Iceland
- Party: Independence Party

Ragnheiður Elín Árnadóttir (born 30 September 1967) is an Icelandic politician who is the director of the OECD Development Centre. She was previously the Minister of Industry and Commerce from 2013 to 2017 and an elected Member of Parliament for the Independence Party between 2007 and 2016.
