= Þorgerður Katrín Gunnarsdóttir =

Icelandic politician (born 1965)

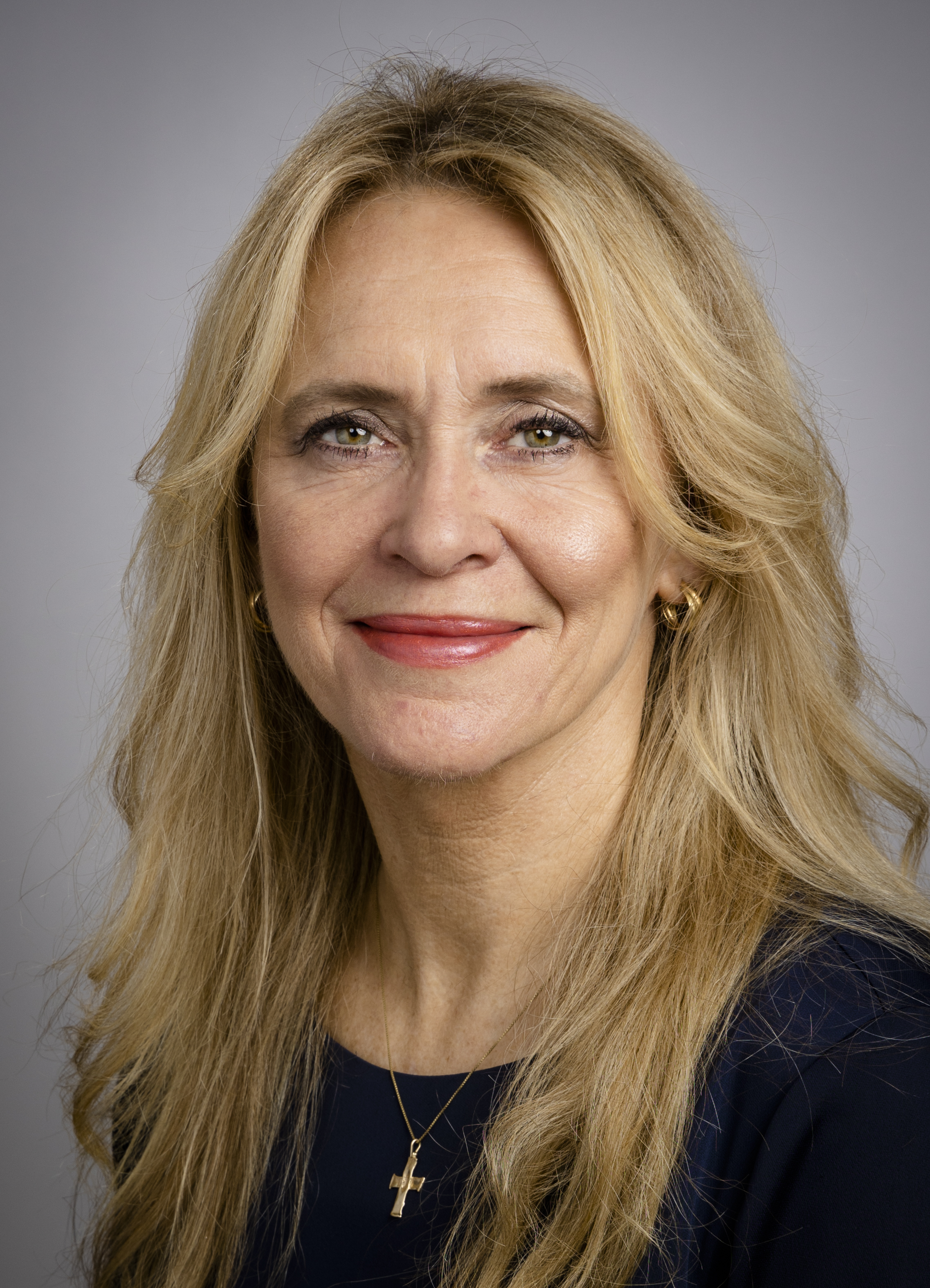
- Official portrait, 2021

Minister for Foreign Affairs
- Incumbent
- Assumed office 21 December 2024
- Prime Minister: Kristrún Frostadóttir
- Preceded by: Þórdís Kolbrún R. Gylfadóttir

Leader of Viðreisn
- Incumbent
- Assumed office 12 October 2017
- Preceded by: Benedikt Jóhannesson

Minister of Fisheries and Agriculture
- In office 11 January 2017 – 30 November 2017
- Prime Minister: Bjarni Benediktsson
- Preceded by: Gunnar Bragi Sveinsson
- Succeeded by: Kristján Þór Júlíusson

Minister of Education, Science, and Culture
- In office 31 December 2003 – 1 February 2009
- Prime Minister: Davíð Oddsson; Halldór Ásgrímsson; Geir Haarde
- Preceded by: Tómas Ingi Olrich
- Succeeded by: Katrín Jakobsdóttir

Member of the Althing
- Incumbent
- Assumed office 29 October 2016
- Constituency: Southwest
- In office 8 May 1999 – 27 April 2013
- Constituency: Reykjanes (1999–2003); Southwest (2003–2013)

Personal details
- Born: 4 October 1965 (age 60) Reykjavík, Iceland
- Party: Viðreisn (2016–present); Independence Party (1999–2016)
- Spouse: Kristján Arason
- Children: 3, including Gísli
- Education: University of Iceland

Þorgerður Katrín Gunnarsdóttir (born 4 October 1965) is an Icelandic politician, who has been chairwoman of Viðreisn since 2017.

Þorgerður Katrín was deputy chairwoman of the Independence Party from 2005 to 2010. She was the Minister of Education, Science and Culture from 31 December 2003 to 1 February 2009. From 2006, Þorgerður Katrín served as acting Prime Minister in the absence of Geir Haarde, including during his 2009 cancer treatment. She left the Independence Party in 2016 and joined the newly founded Viðreisn and became its chairman the following year. She was Minister of Fisheries and Agriculture in 2017.

== Education ==
Þorgerður Katrín took stúdentspróf from Menntaskólanum við Sund in Reykjavík 1985. In her final year she was elected Chairman (Ármaður) of the School Association as the second woman to serve in this position. She subsequently studied law at the University of Iceland and served as a board member in Orator, the Law Students' Society.

== Business career ==
After graduating with a Master of Law degree in 1993 Þorgerður Katrín began her career as a solicitor in a law firm at Höfðabakki. From 1997 to 1999 she was director of the Social and Current Affairs Department at the National Broadcasting Service. She worked for the Icelandic Chamber of Commerce during her break from politics 2013 to 2016.

== Political career ==
During her time at university she served as a board member in Stefnir, the local Independence Party youth organization in Hafnarfjörður, and vice-president of the executive committee of the Board of Representatives of the Independence Party in Hafnarfjörður.

She was elected to the Althing in 1999 for the constituency of Reykjanes and from 2003 (when the Reykjanes constituency was abolished) for the Southwest constituency.

Þorgerður Katrín was Minister of Education in Geir Haarde's government from 2003 to 2009 and functioned as de facto Prime Minister during the crash due to his illness. She served as deputy chairman of the Independence Party 2005 to 2010. Þorgerður Katrín resigned as deputy chairman on 17 April 2010 after being criticised for the handling of she and her husband Kristján Arason's debts in Kaupthing Bank, which collapsed in October 2008. She subsequently took leave of absence from parliament and chose not to run for reelection in the 2013 election.

She joined Viðreisn shortly after it was founded in 2016 and was elected to the Althing for them in the 2016 election. Þorgerður Katrín subsequently became Minister of Fisheries and Agriculture in the short-lived government of Bjarni Benediksson. During the 2017 election campaign her party fell below the threshold in multiple polls and its founder Benedikt Jóhannesson therefore decided to step down as chairman in favour of Þorgerður.

=== Ministry of Foreign Affairs ===
Following the 2024 snap election, her party formed a government with the Social Democratic Alliance and the People's Party, in which she was appointed minister for foreign affairs.

On 26 September 2026, during her address to the United Nations General Assembly on the situation in Gaza, Gunnarsdóttir responded to the term "moral cowards," which Benjamin Netanyahu had used a day earlier (25 September 2026) to describe delegates who walked out during his speech. Reversing the accusation, she stated: "We have heard the words 'moral cowards' from this podium. To me, moral cowards are those leaders around the world who refuse to sit down and negotiate a just and lasting peace. Those who deny access to humanitarian aid for people in desperate need. And moral cowards are those leaders who repeatedly go against and disrespect international law."

== Personal life ==
Þorgerður Katrín's father was Gunnar Eyjólfsson, an actor, who was born on 24 February 1926 and died on 21 November 2016. Her husband is Kristján Arason who was CEO of Retail Banking at Kaupthing Bank and previously one of Iceland's most successful handball players. Þorgerður Katrín and Kristján have three children, Gunnar Ari (1995), Gísli Þorgeir (1999) and Katrín Erla (2003).

At the time of the Icelandic financial crisis her husband owed Kaupthing bank just under 900 million ISK which he had borrowed to purchase shares in the bank. The debt was never repaid, as the board of Kaupthing allowed their executives to transfer their loans and shares into private holding companies a few months before the bank was taken over by the Icelandic authorities. These companies subsequently defaulted.

Þorgerður Katrín played handball in the 1980s, first with ÍR and later with FH where she won the Icelandic Cup in 1984. She later played for VfL Gummersbach in Germany. Following her playing career, she became a handball referee. In November 1993, she became the first female referee to referee a match in the Icelandic top-tier women's league. In February 1994, she became the first woman to referee in the Icelandic top-tier men's league.

Political offices
Preceded by Tomas Ingi Olrich	Minister of Education, Science and Culture; 2003–2009	Succeeded by Katrín Jakobsdóttir
Preceded by Gunnar Bragi Sveinsson	Minister of Fisheries and Agriculture; 2017	Succeeded by Kristján Þór Júlíusson
Preceded by Þórdís Kolbrún R. Gylfadóttir	Minister for Foreign Affairs; 2024–present	Incumbent
Party political offices
Preceded by Benedikt Jóhannesson	Leader of Viðreisn; 2017–present	Incumbent
