= Illugi Gunnarsson =

Icelandic politician (born 1967)

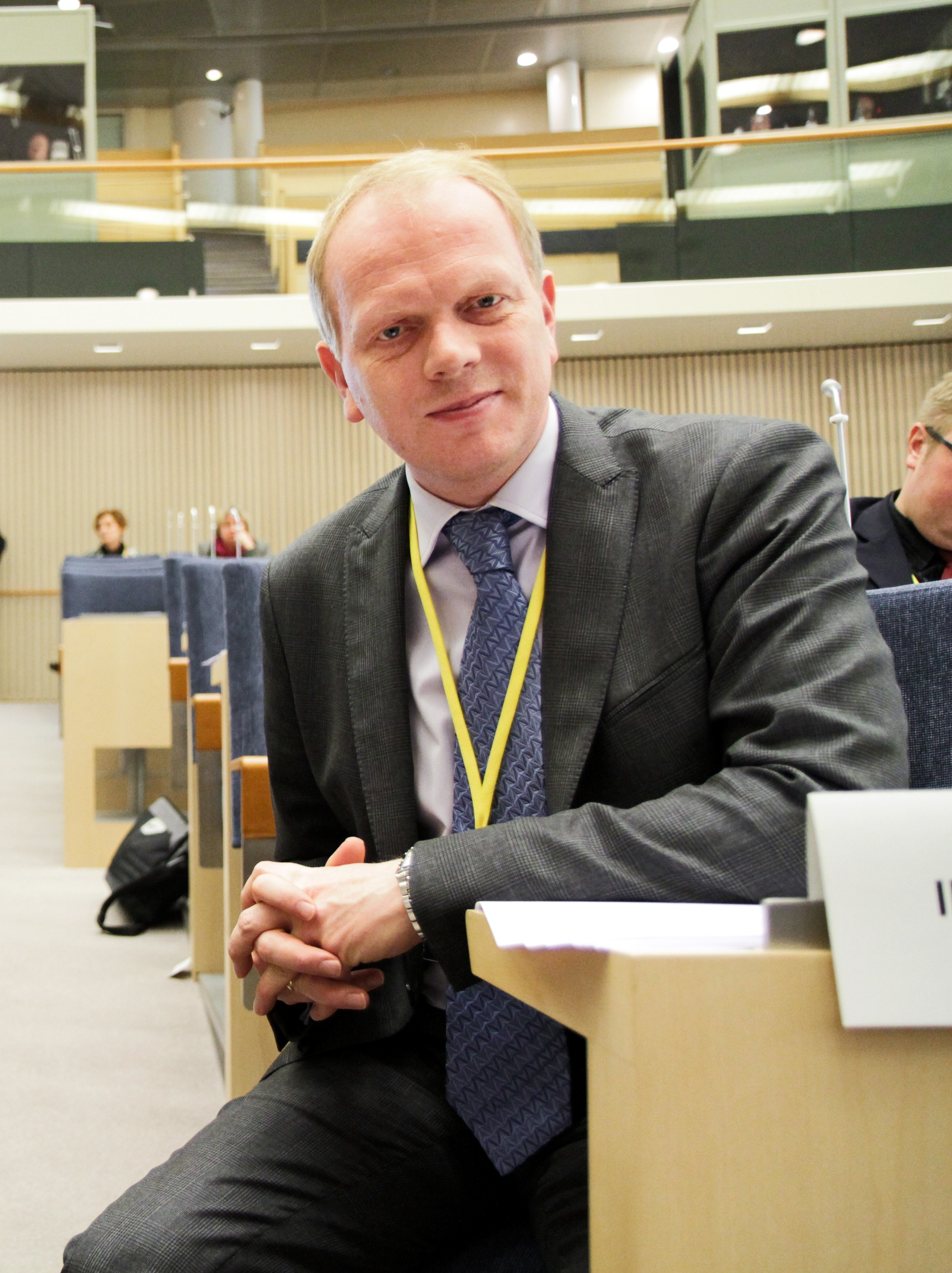
- Illugi Gunnarsson (2015)

Minister for Education, Science, and Culture
- In office 23 May 2013 – 11 January 2017
- Prime Minister: Sigmundur Davíð Gunnlaugsson; Sigurður Ingi Jóhannsson
- Preceded by: Katrín Jakobsdóttir
- Succeeded by: Kristján Þór Júlíusson

Personal details
- Born: 26 August 1967 (age 59) Siglufjörður, Iceland
- Party: Independence Party
- Spouse: Brynhildur Einarsdóttir
- Children: 1
- Education: London Business School; University of Iceland

Illugi Gunnarsson (born 26 August 1967) is an Icelandic politician and former member of the Althing. He is the former Minister of Education, Science and Culture.

Political offices
Preceded by Katrín Jakobsdóttir	Minister of Education, Science and Culture; 2013 – 2017	Succeeded by Kristján Þór Júlíusson
