= Kristján Þór Júlíusson =

Icelandic politician (born 1957)

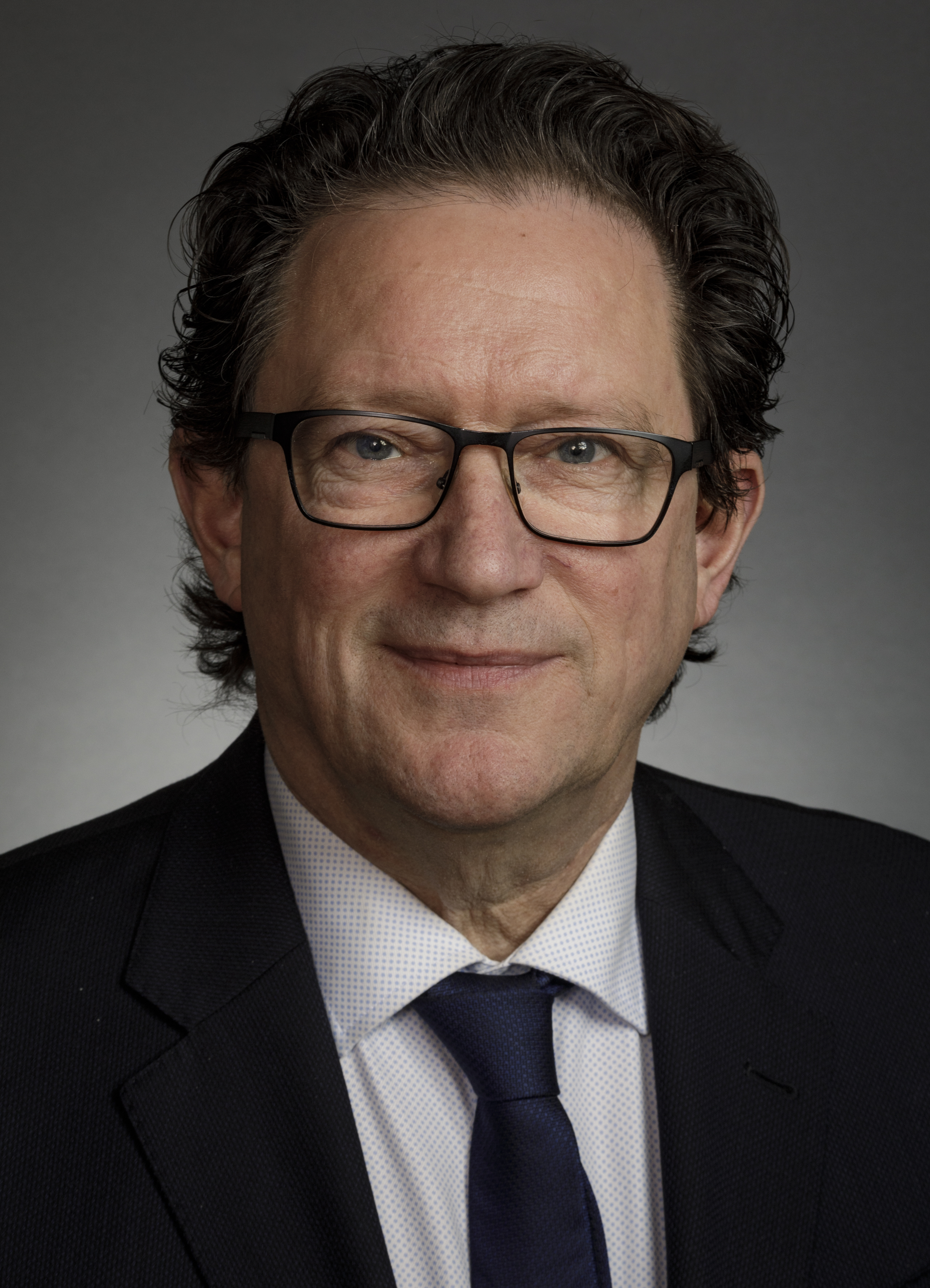
- official portrait, 2017

Minister of Fisheries and Agriculture
- In office 30 November 2017 – 28 November 2021
- Prime Minister: Katrín Jakobsdóttir
- Preceded by: Þorgerður Katrín Gunnarsdóttir
- Succeeded by: Svandís Svavarsdóttir

Minister of Education, Science, and Culture
- In office 11 January 2017 – 30 November 2017
- Prime Minister: Bjarni Benediktsson
- Preceded by: Illugi Gunnarsson
- Succeeded by: Lilja Dögg Alfreðsdóttir

Minister of Health
- In office 23 May 2013 – 11 January 2017
- Prime Minister: Sigmundur Davíð Gunnlaugsson; Sigurður Ingi Jóhannsson
- Preceded by: Guðbjartur Hannesson
- Succeeded by: Óttarr Proppé

Mayor of Akureyri
- In office 1998 – January 2007
- Preceded by: Jakob Björnsson
- Succeeded by: Sigrún Björk Jakobsdóttir

Personal details
- Born: 15 July 1957 (age 69) Dalvík, Iceland
- Party: Independence Party
- Spouse: Guðbjörg Ringsted
- Children: 4
- Education: University of Iceland

Kristján Þór Júlíusson (15 July 1957 in Dalvík) is an Icelandic politician, a member of Alþingi and former Minister of Fisheries and Agriculture. He completed degrees in Icelandic, literature and teaching at the University of Iceland but most of his education has been concerned with seamanship. He is a certified steersman and captain and worked in that field for several years. He is married to Guðbjörg Ringsted and they have four children; María, Júlíus, Gunnar and Þorsteinn.

In 1986 he became the mayor of Dalvík for the Independence Party and remained in office until 1994 when he moved to Ísafjörður and took on the job of mayor there until 1997. In the 1998 municipal elections he ran for office in Akureyri and has since been credited for the increased support for the Independence Party in Akureyri at the expense of the Progressive Party, which had been the most powerful in Akureyri for decades. From 1998 to 2006 Kristján was head of a coalition between the Independence Party and the Progressive Party but in the current term the Independence Party forms a coalition with the Social Democratic Alliance.

In January 2007 he stepped down as mayor of Akureyri to run for a seat on Alþingi, which he won.
