= Bright Future (Iceland) =

Icelandic political party

Bright Future Björt framtíð
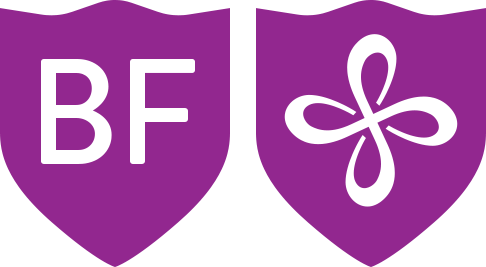
- Chairperson: Theodóra Sigurlaug Þorsteinsdóttir
- Founded: 4 February 2012
- Headquarters: Austurstræti 8–10
- Ideology: Liberalism; Social liberalism; Green liberalism; Pro-Europeanism
- Political position: Centre
- Nordic affiliation: Centre Group
- Colours: Purple, White
- Seats in Parliament: 0 / 63

Election symbol
- A

Website
- www.bjortframtid.is

Bright Future (Icelandic: Björt framtíð) is a liberal political party in Iceland founded in 2012. It briefly participated in government, supporting the first cabinet of Prime Minister Bjarni Benediktsson from January to September 2017 before withdrawing and triggering the 2017 Icelandic parliamentary election, in which it lost all seats.

The party was a member of the Alliance of Liberals and Democrats for Europe (ALDE) party and had links to the ALDE Group in the European Parliament, although it resigned its membership of ALDE in October 2019.

== History ==
The party was founded on 4 February 2012. Before the 2013 general election, it included two Members of Parliament, Guðmundur Steingrímsson (who defected from the Progressive Party) and Róbert Marshall (who defected from the Social Democratic Alliance). Guðmundur had been elected as a candidate of the Progressive Party, but left the party to sit as an independent. In 2012, Guðmundur formed Bright Future with the Best Party, with which it shared initials in Icelandic, "BF." Several members of Best Party, which was dissolved in June 2014, joined Bright Future. The party was formed to contest the April 2013 parliamentary election. The party won six seats, making it the fifth largest in parliament.

The party was reduced to four seats at the 2016 election, and was part of Bjarni Benediktsson's right-leaning governing coalition with Liberal Reform Party and Bjarni's Independence Party, with Björt Ólafsdóttir being named Minister for the Environment and Natural Resources and Óttarr Proppé being named Minister for Health. Subsequently, Bright Future dropped significantly in opinion polls. After nine months in government, Bright Future withdrew from cabinet after it was revealed that Bjarni's father Benedikt Sveinsson had signed a letter seeking to "restore the honour" of a convicted paedophile, and that Bjarni had known since July. The party lost all of its Althing seats in the 2017 election.

In the 2018 Icelandic municipal elections the party presented a combined list with the Liberal Reform Party under “BF-Viðreisn”. In 2019, the party’s leader, Theodóra Sigurlaug Þorsteinsdóttir, expressed an interest in merging the party with the Liberal Reform Party, but the plans have not come to fruition. The party did not present any lists in the 2021 or 2024 parliamentary elections. Despite inactivity, the party continues to have a registered election symbol, meaning it is considered an active party.

== Ideology ==
The party supports Iceland joining the European Union and adopting the euro as Iceland's national currency.

== Electoral results ==
Election	Votes	%	Seats	+/–	Position	Government
2013	15,583	8.25	6 / 63	6	5th	Opposition
2016	13,578	7.2	4 / 63	▼2	▼6th	Coalition
2017	2,394	1.2	0 / 63	▼4	▼9th	Extra-parliamentary

== Elected politicians ==
=== Chairpersons ===
Chairperson	Period
Guðmundur Steingrímsson	2012–2015
Óttarr Proppé	2015–2017
Björt Ólafsdóttir	2017–2018
Theodóra Sigurlaug Þorsteinsdóttir	2018–

=== Members of the Althing ===
- Nichole Leigh Mosty
