= Bjarni Benediktsson (born 1970) =

Prime Minister of Iceland in 2017 and 2024

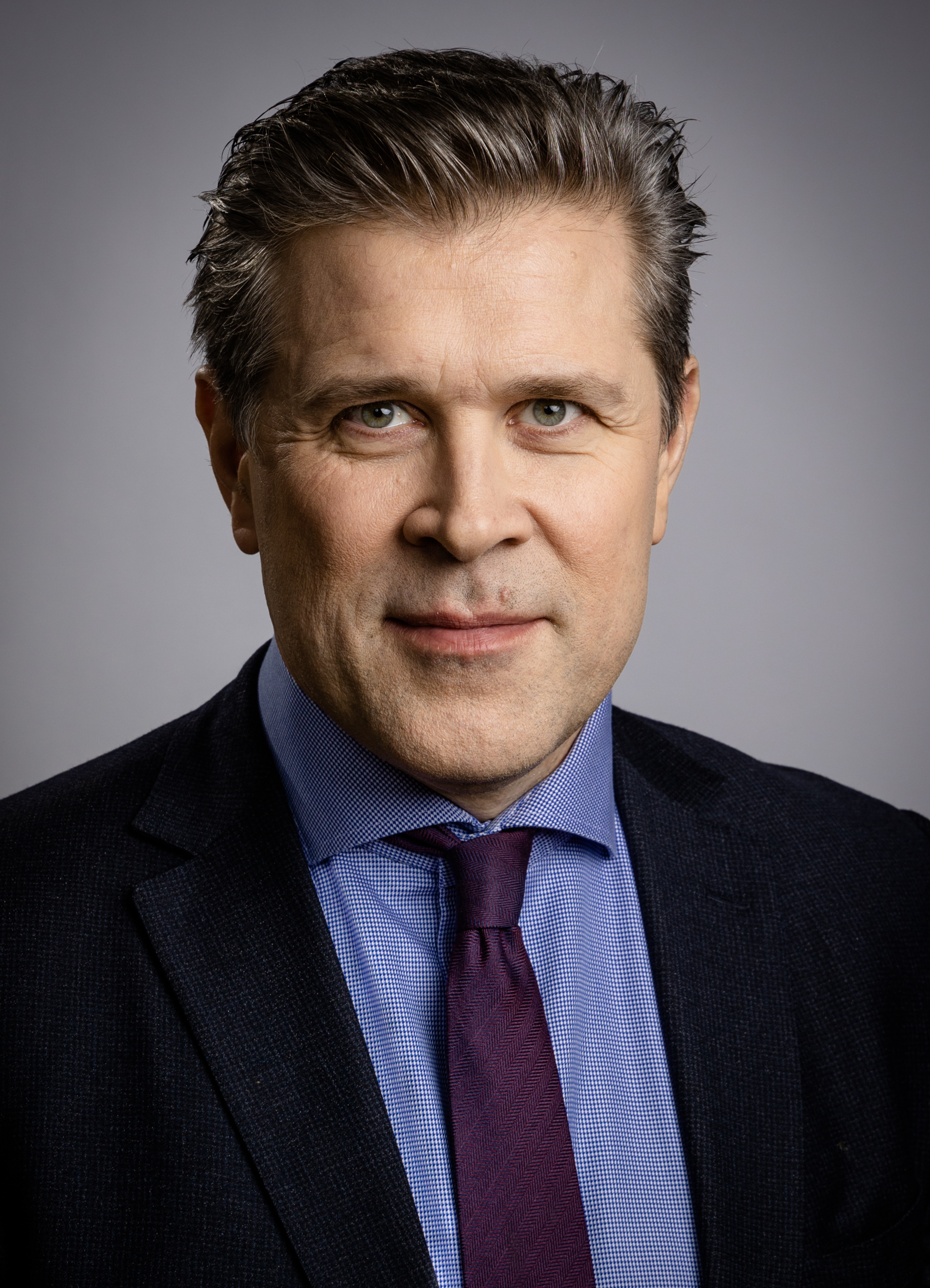
- Official portrait, 2021

Prime Minister of Iceland
- In office 9 April 2024 – 21 December 2024
- President: Guðni Th. Jóhannesson; Halla Tómasdóttir
- Preceded by: Katrín Jakobsdóttir
- Succeeded by: Kristrún Frostadóttir
- In office 11 January 2017 – 30 November 2017
- President: Guðni Th. Jóhannesson
- Preceded by: Sigurður Ingi Jóhannsson
- Succeeded by: Katrín Jakobsdóttir

Minister for Foreign Affairs
- In office 14 October 2023 – 9 April 2024
- Prime Minister: Katrín Jakobsdóttir
- Preceded by: Þórdís Kolbrún R. Gylfadóttir
- Succeeded by: Þórdís Kolbrún R. Gylfadóttir

Minister for Finance and Economic Affairs
- In office 30 November 2017 – 14 October 2023
- Prime Minister: Katrín Jakobsdóttir
- Preceded by: Benedikt Jóhannesson
- Succeeded by: Þórdís Kolbrún R. Gylfadóttir
- In office 23 May 2013 – 11 January 2017
- Prime Minister: Sigmundur Davíð Gunnlaugsson; Sigurður Ingi Jóhannsson
- Preceded by: Katrín Júlíusdóttir
- Succeeded by: Benedikt Jóhannesson

Leader of the Independence Party
- In office 29 March 2009 – 2 March 2025
- Deputy: Þorgerður Katrín Gunnarsdóttir; Ólöf Nordal; Hanna Birna Kristjánsdóttir; Þórdís Kolbrún R. Gylfadóttir
- Preceded by: Geir Haarde
- Succeeded by: Guðrún Hafsteinsdóttir

Member of the Althing
- In office 10 May 2003 – 6 January 2025
- Constituency: Southwest

Personal details
- Born: 26 January 1970 (age 56) Reykjavík, Iceland
- Party: Independence
- Spouse: Þóra Margrét Baldvinsdóttir
- Children: 4
- Education: University of Iceland; University of Miami
- Nickname: Bjarni Ben

Bjarni Benediktsson (Icelandic: [ˈpja(r)tnɪ ˈpɛːnɛtɪxtsˌsɔːn]; born 26 January 1970), known colloquially as Bjarni Ben, is an Icelandic former politician who served as the prime minister of Iceland from January to November 2017 and again from April to December 2024. He was the leader of the Icelandic Independence Party from 2009 to 2025, and served as the minister of finance and economic affairs from 2013 to 2017, a post he later retained under Katrín Jakobsdóttir and held until his resignation in October 2023. After serving briefly as the Minister for Foreign Affairs from 2023 to 2024, Bjarni became prime minister again on 9 April 2024.

During his career, Bjarni was sometimes called a "teflon" politician, due to managing to retain his position as one of Iceland's most powerful politicians despite his frequent involvement in political scandals.

== Early life and education ==
Bjarni was born in Reykjavík. His great uncle was the former prime minister of the same name, Bjarni Benediktsson.

After obtaining a law degree at the University of Iceland, Bjarni went on to study German and law at the Goethe-Institut and University of Freiburg, respectively, in Germany from 1995 to 1996. The following year, he attended the University of Miami in the United States, where he earned an LL.M. degree. He then returned to Iceland, where he worked as an attorney.

== Political career ==
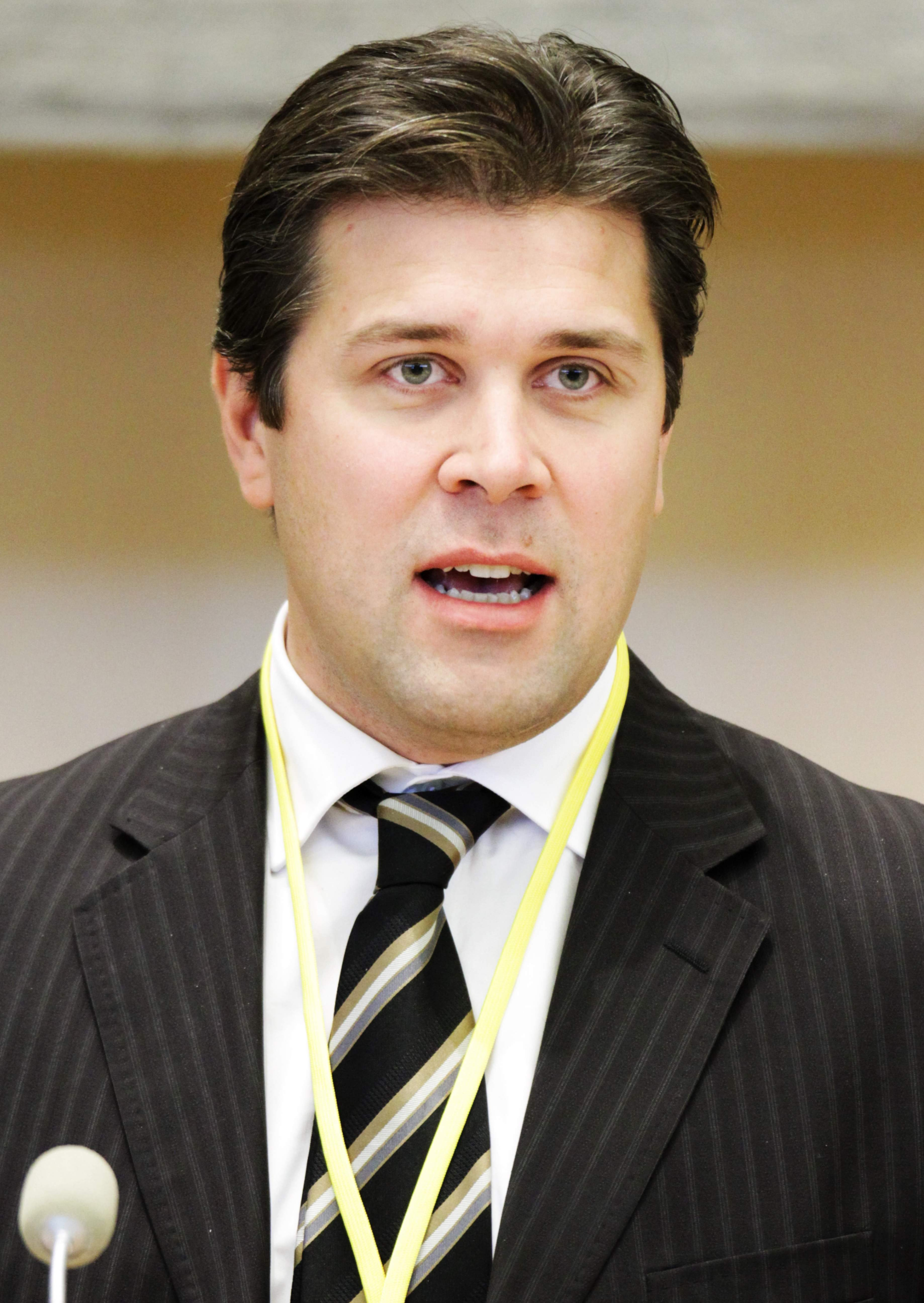
Bjarni Benediktsson in 2009

Bjarni entered the national parliament in 2003 and has been active in several committees in the areas of economy and taxation, industry and foreign affairs.

Bjarni was elected leader of the conservative Independence Party at its national convention on 29 March 2009 with 58.1 percent of the vote, about a month before the April 2009 Icelandic legislative elections. The party came in second in the elections with 16 seats, nine fewer than in the previous elections. After conceding defeat on 26 April 2009, Bjarni said his party had lost the trust of voters. "We lost this time but we will win again later," he said.

In the 2013 Althing elections on 28 April the Independence Party and their ally the Progressive Party each won 19 seats. On 17 May 2013 Icelandic media reported that Bjarni would take up the position of Minister of Finance and Economic Affairs in a cabinet led by Progressive Party leader Sigmundur Davíð Gunnlaugsson. In the 2016 Althing elections, the Independence Party won 21 seats, while the Progressive party only won 8. Shortly after the results, Prime Minister Sigurður Ingi Jóhannsson resigned from his post. A new coalition between the Independence Party, Viðreisn and Bright Future was formed in January 2017 with Bjarni designated to become prime minister.

In January 2025, he resigned his Althing seat and announced that he wouldn't seek re-election as leader of the Independence Party.

=== Controversies ===
==== Panama Papers ====
As reported in 2016, Bjarni "shared what is known as 'power of attorney' over a shell company" involved in the Panama Papers.

Bjarni came under criticism in January 2017 for not revealing a government report on the offshore bank activities of Icelanders before the 2016 parliamentary elections. Bjarni falsely told reporters that he had not seen the report prior to the elections. He later apologized for his "inaccurate timeline".

==== Breach of COVID-19 rules ====
Shortly before midnight on 23 December 2020, police in Reykjavík dissolved a gathering of 40-50 people at the art gallery Ásmundarsalur for breach of COVID-19 restrictions. Police report stated that a senior minister in the government had been present, later revealed to be Bjarni. At the time, COVID-19 restrictions limited gatherings in Iceland to ten people. The venue, which sells alcoholic beverages, was also not allowed to be open after 10 pm.

Bjarni claimed that he had visited the exhibition with his wife to greet their friends and that he was only present for 15 minutes during which the number of guests increased. "The right reaction would have been to leave the gallery as soon as I realized that the number of people exceeded the limit. I didn't do that and I apologise for that mistake" he said in a statement posted on Facebook. According to a source of the newspaper Vísir, Bjarni was however present for at least 45 minutes.

Chief epidemiologist Þórólfur Guðnason said that Bjarni's actions set a "bad example" and he did not expect the public to perceive it well. Furthermore, he said the gathering had been a clear violation of COVID-19 restrictions.

=== Prime Minister (2017) ===
Bjarni became Prime Minister of Iceland on 11 January 2017. In September 2017, the future of the Icelandic government and Bjarni's tenure as prime minister was put in doubt when the Bright Future party withdrew from the governing coalition. Bright Future did this in the wake of reporting that government ministers of the Independence Party had concealed that Bjarni's father, Benedikt Sveinsson, recommended that the criminal record of convicted child sex offender Hjalti Sigurjón Hauksson be erased.

The Minister of Justice, Sigríður Andersen, had informed Bjarni about his father's involvement in the letter of recommendation in July, and refused to disclose the recommendation's author until compelled to by a parliamentary committee.

In January 2017 he was named as the eighth hottest head of state in the world.

=== Minister of Finance and Economic Affairs (2017–2023, second term) ===
After the 2017 parliamentary elections, Katrín Jakobsdóttir became prime minister, and in a coalition agreement, Bjarni became the finance minister again. Bjarni resigned on 10 October 2023, following the release of a report by the Althing Ombudsman which heavily condemned his conduct relating to the sale of state-owned shares in the bank Íslandsbanki.

=== Minister of Foreign Affairs (2023–2024) ===
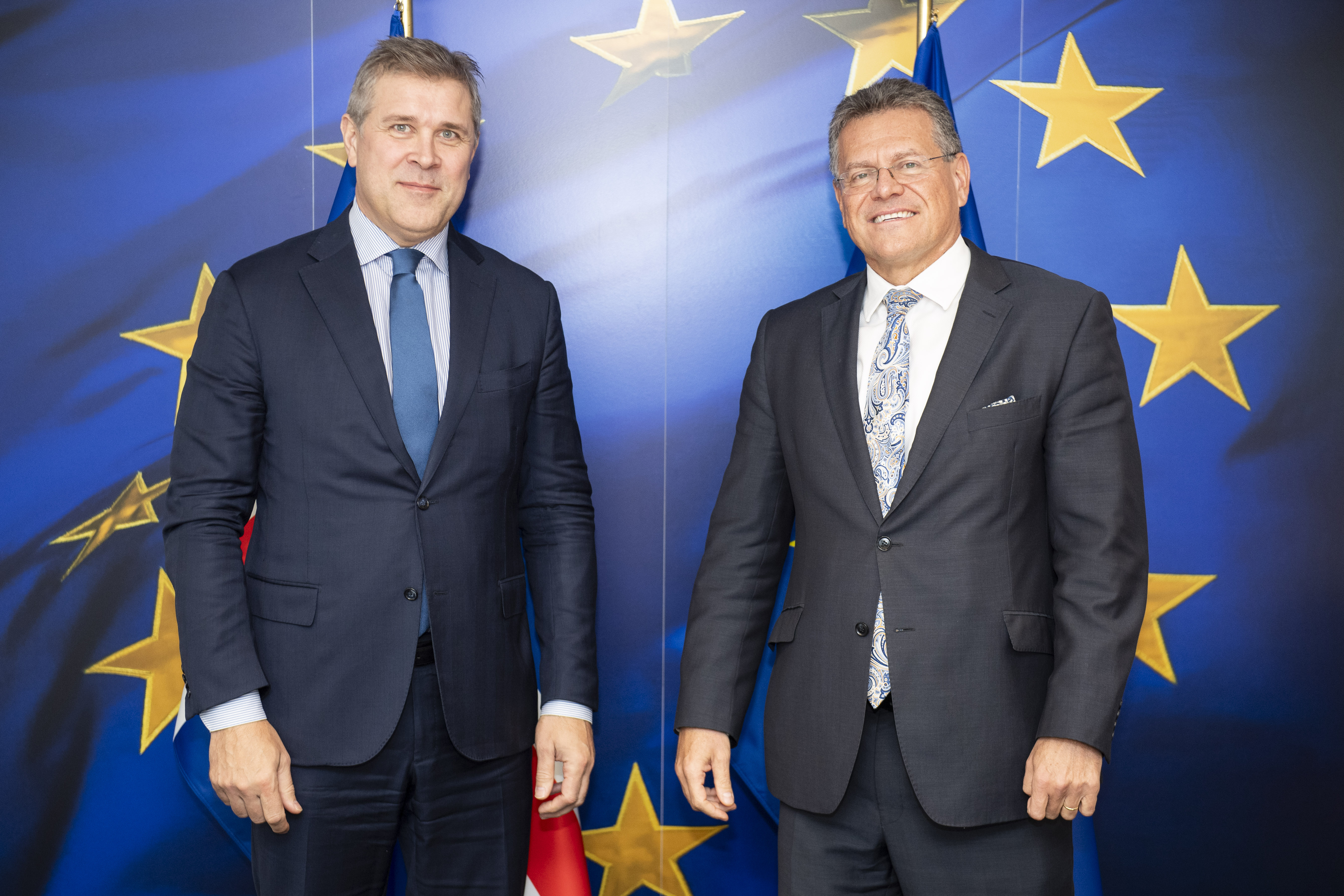
Benediktsson met with Vice-President of the European Commission Maroš Šefčovič in Brussels, 20 November 2023

Only a few days after his resignation as minister of finance and economic affairs, Bjarni was appointed minister of foreign affairs. His predecessor in the position, Þórdís Kolbrún R. Gylfadóttir, was appointed his successor as finance minister.

In a meeting of Nordic foreign ministers in Oslo, Norway in November 2023, he refused to condemn Israel's bombing of the Jabalia refugee camp on the Gaza Strip the preceding day, questioning whether it could be described as an "attack” Bjarni stated: "It depends on what you define as an 'attack'".

=== Prime Minister (2024, second term) ===
On 9 April 2024, Bjarni became Prime Minister of Iceland following Katrín Jakobsdóttir's resignation to run for president.

He began his second term with a 13% approval rating. Bjarni faced a no-confidence vote on 18 April which failed 35 to 25.

On 13 October, Bjarni announced that the government had collapsed due to disputes over foreign policy, asylum seekers, and energy, prompting him to call for new elections in November. Four days after the announcement, the Left-Green Movement withdrew from the government. Bjarni additionally took on the portfolios of agriculture, social affairs and labour.

== Post-political career ==
Bjarni was hired as Chief Executive Director of the Confederation of Icelandic Enterprise in January 2026.

== Prime ministerial trips ==
Benediktsson has visited 6 countries during his tenure as prime minister. The number of visits per country where Benediktsson has travelled are:

- One visit to Belgium, Malawi, Switzerland and the United Kingdom
- Two visits to Sweden and the United States

=== 2017 ===
Country	Location(s)	Dates	Details
Belgium	Brussels	25–26 May	Benediktsson attended the NATO summit.

=== 2024 ===
Country	Location(s)	Dates	Details
Sweden	Stockholm	13-14 May	Meeting with German chancellor Olaf Scholz, Prime Minister Ulf Kristersson, Danish prime minister Mette Frederiksen, Finnish prime minister Petteri Orpo and Norwegian prime minister Jonas Gahr Støre.
Malawi	Mangochi	19–23 May	Met with President Lazarus Chakwera. During the visit, they celebrated 35 years of diplomatic relations and strengthened bilateral cooperation.
Sweden	Stockholm	31 May	Attended Nordic-Ukrainian summit hosted by Prime Minister Ulf Kristersson. Met with President of Ukraine, Volodymyr Zelenskyy and signed 10-year bilateral security cooperation agreements between Iceland and Ukraine.
Switzerland	Lucerne	15–16 June	Benediktsson travelled to Nidwalden to attend the Global peace summit.
United States	Washington D.C.	9–11 July	Benediktsson attended the 2024 NATO summit
United Kingdom	Woodstock	18 July	Benediktsson attended the 4th European Political Community Summit.
United States	New York City	22–23 September	Attended Summit of the Future

=== Multilateral meetings ===
Bjarni Benediktsson participated in the following summits during his first and second premierships:

Group	Year	
Group	2017	2024
NATO	25 May (Belgium) Brussels	9–11 July (United States) Washington, D.C.
EPC	Didn't exist	18 July (United Kingdom) Woodstock
EPC	Didn't exist	7 November^{[a]} (Hungary) Budapest
JEF	none	17 December^{[b]} (Estonia) Tallinn
Others	none	Global Peace Summit; 15–16 June (Switzerland) Lucerne
Did not attend^aWithdrew in the wake of Iceland's ruling coalition being dissolved^bMinister for Foreign Affairs Þórdís Kolbrún R. Gylfadóttir attended in the prime minister's place

Party political offices
Preceded by Geir Haarde	Leader of the Independence Party; 2009–2025	Succeeded by Guðrún Hafsteinsdóttir
Political offices
Preceded by Katrín Júlíusdóttir	Minister for Finance and Economic Affairs; 2013–2017	Succeeded by Benedikt Jóhannesson
Preceded by Sigurður Ingi Jóhannsson	Prime Minister of Iceland; 2017	Succeeded by Katrín Jakobsdóttir
Preceded by Benedikt Jóhannesson	Minister for Finance and Economic Affairs; 2017–2023	Succeeded by Þórdís Kolbrún R. Gylfadóttir
Preceded by Þórdís Kolbrún R. Gylfadóttir	Minister for Foreign Affairs; 2023–2024	Succeeded by Þórdís Kolbrún R. Gylfadóttir
Preceded by Katrín Jakobsdóttir	Prime Minister of Iceland; 2024	Succeeded by Kristrún Frostadóttir
Preceded by Guðmundur Ingi Guðbrandsson	Minister of Social Affairs and the Labour Market; 2024	Succeeded by Inga Sæland as Minister of Social Affairs and Housing
Preceded by Bjarkey Gunnarsdóttir	Minister of Food, Fisheries and Agriculture; 2024	Succeeded by Hanna Katrín Friðriksson as Minister of Industries
