= Ministry of Education and Children (Iceland) =

Government ministry of Iceland

Coordinates: 64°08′54″N 21°55′52″W

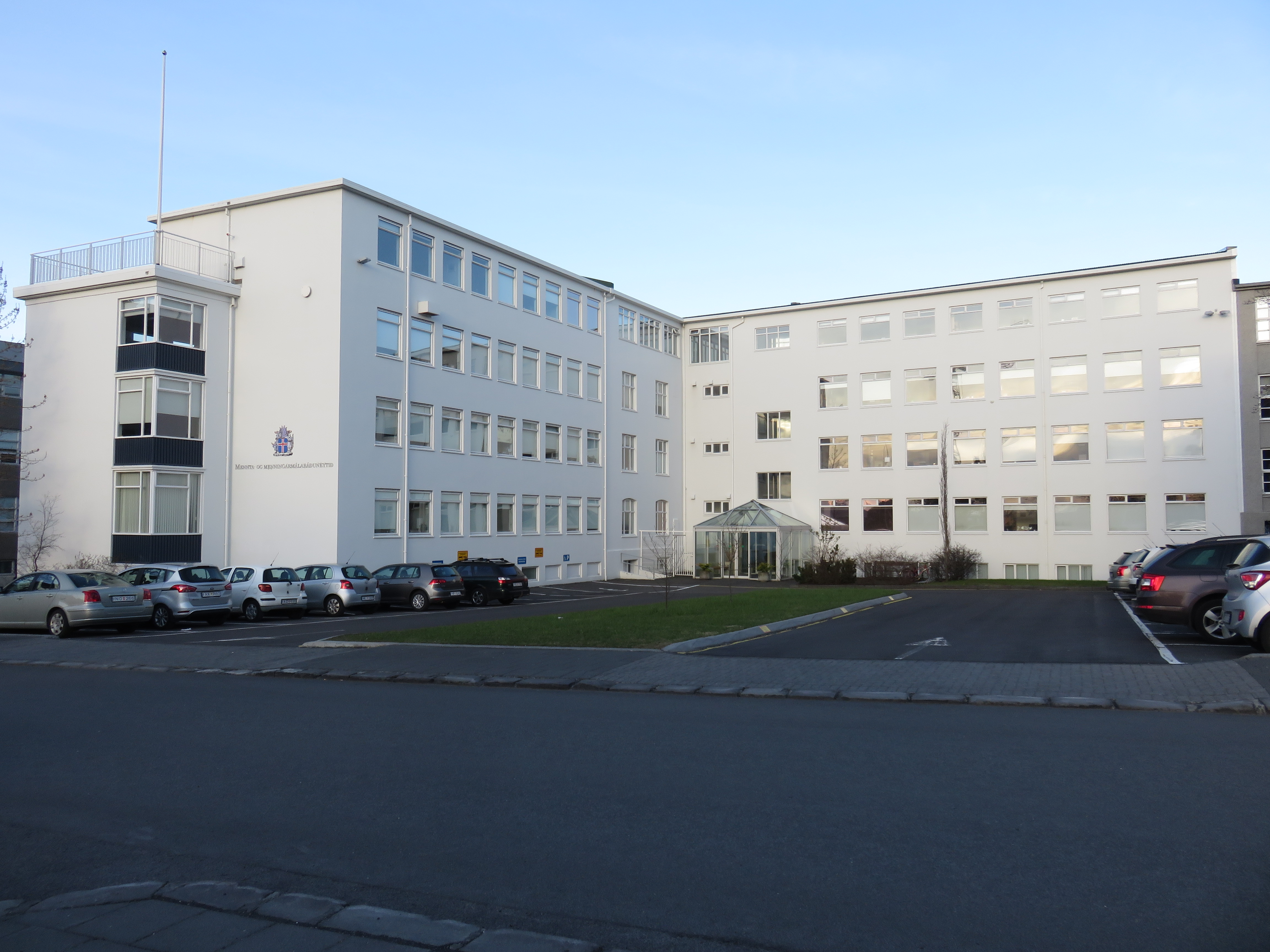
Ministry of Education and Children building in Reykjavík in 2018

The Ministry of Education and Children (Icelandic: Mennta- og barnamálaráðuneytið) is an Icelandic cabinet-level ministry founded 16 December 1942. The ministry is divided into three departments and four offices.

The current Minister of Education and Children's Affairs is Inga Sæland.

== See also ==
- Education and General Affairs Committee
- Icelandic Centre for Research
