= Ministry of Industries and Innovation (Iceland) =

Government ministry of Iceland

The Ministry of Industries and Innovation of Iceland (Icelandic: Atvinnuvega- og nýsköpunarráðuneyti Íslands) is one of the eight ministries of the Government of Iceland. The ministry was created through the merger of four previously separated ministries: Ministry of Commerce (also called at various periods "Ministry of Trade", or "Ministry of Business Affairs"), Ministry of Industry, Ministry of Fisheries and Ministry of Agriculture. This merger was done in several steps:

- in 1988, Jón Sigurðsson became the first Icelandic politician to cumulate both portfolios in the Second cabinet of Steingrímur Hermannsson; all his successors till 2007 and the Second cabinet of Geir Haarde did the same, although, at least in title, the ministries were still separated. In 2012 both ministries were merged once and for all, the administration being merged with the recent Ministry of Fisheries and Agriculture.
- On 13 June 2007 the parliament of Iceland passed law changes to merge the Ministry of Fisheries and the Ministry of Agriculture, which took effect on 1 January 2008. This new ministry was then merged with the Ministry of Industry, Energy and Tourism, and the Ministry of Business Affairs to form the "Ministry of Industries and Innovation".

Since 2014, there are generally two ministers, one for the Industries and Innovation (and also often Tourism), and one for Fisheries and Agriculture (sometimes that one also cumulated with the portfolio of Minister for the Environment and Natural Resources), but they are both attached to the same administration.
