= 2026 Reykjavík City Council election =

Icelandic municipal election

- 16 May 2026
- All 23 seats in the Reykjavík City Council; 12 seats needed for a majority
Party	Leader	Vote %	Seats	+/–
Independence	Hildur Björnsdóttir	32.92	9	+3
Social Democratic	Pétur Marteinsson	18.28	5	0
Centre	Ari Edwald	11.36	3	+3
Viðreisn	Björg Magnúsdóttir	10.67	2	+1
Left-Green	Líf Magneudóttir	9.54	2	+1
Progressive	Einar Þorsteinsson	6.90	1	−3
Socialist	Silja Sóley Birgisdóttir	4.10	1	−1
This lists parties that won seats. See the complete results below.
Mayor before	Mayor after
Heiða Björg Hilmisdóttir; Social Democratic	Hildur Björnsdóttir; Independence Party

The 2026 Reykjavík City Council election took place on 16 May 2026 to elect all 23 seats in the Reykjavík City Council on the same day as other municipal elections across Iceland.

== Background ==
There were 108,518 eligible voters, including Icelandic citizens aged 18 and older, citizens of other Nordic countries who maintain legal residence in Reykjavík, and foreign nationals from non-Nordic countries with legal residence in Iceland for three or more years.

== Opinion polls ==
Outlet	Date	Sample Size	D	S	B	P	J	C	F	A	M	R	Others	Lead
Maskína	29 April–6 May 2026		27.9	18.0	5.7	4.9	5.1	12.6	2.8	13.2	6.7	1.6	1.4	9.9
Gallup	17–29 April 2026	946	30	22	3	3	5	9	2	13	10	–	2	8
Gallup	1–15 April 2026	857	27.6	23.2	3.9	3.5	2.5	10.0	3.8	13.5	10.7	1.5	0.0	4.4
Maskína	12–19 March 2026	1,442	21.2	21.7	5.2	5.4	2.7	12.6	3.7	12.4	10.6	2.3	2.1	0.5
Gallup	4 March 2026		26.4	26.4	4.6	3.7	3.1	10.7	4.0	8.7	11.3	1.2	–	0
Maskína	1–27 February 2026	1,015	22.7	24.0	5.1	5.5	3.7	13.5	3.4	9.1	11.0	1.2	–	1.3
Maskína	January 2026		24.4	26.1	4.4	3.0	3.8	14.6	3.8	8.7	10.1	–	1.0	1.7
Maskína	December 2025		24.1	26.7	4.5	6.3	5.5	12.1	4.8	5.3	10.0	–	0.6	2.6
Maskína	November 2025		31.0	25.5	4.2	6.4	5.0	11.9	2.9	4.2	8.5	–	0.3	5.5
Maskína	October 2025		25.4	26.0	3.9	7.1	6.1	13.3	5.2	3.8	8.5	–	0.7	0.6
Maskína	September 2025		24.8	28.1	3.4	6.7	3.9	14.9	4.6	5.5	7.1	–	1.0	3.3
2022 election	14 May 2022	–	24.5	20.3	18.7	11.6	7.7	5.2	4.5	4.0	2.5	–	1.0	4.2

== Results ==
Party	Votes	%	Seats	+/–
Independence Party	22,930	32.92	9	+3
Social Democratic Alliance	12,737	18.28	5	0
Centre Party	7,912	11.36	3	+3
Reform Party	7,436	10.67	2	+1
Left-Green Movement	6,649	9.54	2	+1
Progressive Party	4,805	6.90	1	–3
Icelandic Socialist Party	2,858	4.10	1	–1
People's Party	2,319	3.33	0	–1
Pirate Party	1,348	1.94	0	–3
Good Day Party	361	0.52	0	0
Our City Party	306	0.44	0	0
Total	69,661	100.00	23	0
Valid votes	69,661	98.12		
Invalid votes	228	0.32		
Blank votes	1,107	1.56		
Total votes	70,996	100.00		
Registered voters/turnout	108,518	65.42		
Source: Reyjkavik City Council

== See also ==
- 2026 Icelandic municipal elections
