= Guðrún Pétursdóttir (disambiguation) =

Guðrún Pétursdóttir may refer to:

- Guðrún Pétursdóttir, an Icelandic physiologist
- Guðrún Jónasson née Pétursdótti, an Icelandic politician
