= Sanna Magdalena Mörtudóttir =

Icelandic-Tanzanian politician (born 1992)

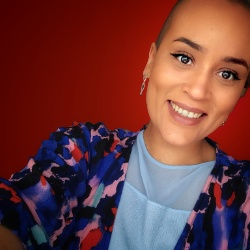
- Sanna Magdalena Mörtudóttir in 2023

Leader of the Icelandic Socialist Party
- In office 20 October 2024 – 26 May 2025
- Preceded by: Gunnar Smári Egilsson
- Succeeded by: Sæþór Benjamín Randalsson

Member of Reykjavík City Council
- Incumbent
- Assumed office 2018

President of Reykjavík City Council
- In office 21 February 2025 – 2 June 2026
- Preceded by: Thordis Loa Thorhallsdottir
- Succeeded by: Björg Magnusdottir

Personal details
- Born: Sanna Magdalena Mörtudóttir; 3 May 1992 (age 34) Reykjavík, Iceland
- Party: Socialist Party of Iceland
- Education: University of Iceland
- Occupation: politician

Sanna Magdalena Mörtudóttir (born 3 May 1992) is an Icelandic politician. She was the leader of the Icelandic Socialist Party from 2024 to 2025 and has been a municipal representative on Reykjavík City Council since 2018. At the age of 26, she became the youngest city councillor in the history of Reykjavík.

In 2024, she was elected leader of the Icelandic Socialist Party and lead the party's list in the Reykjavík South constituency in the 2024 Icelandic parliamentary election.

== Early life ==
Sanna was born in Reykjavík. Her mother is Icelandic and her father is Tanzanian. Her parents met in England and Sanna grew up in London for her early years. When she was seven years old, she moved with her mother to Reykjavík, where she grew up. In her political campaigning she revealed that she experienced poverty in her childhood.

Sanna has an MA in Anthropology from the University of Iceland.

== Career ==
At 26 years old, Sanna was elected to Reykjavík city council as leader of the Socialist Party in the country's local elections in 2018. She broke the record as the youngest city representative in the history of Reykjavík. In politics, she has focused on issues related to equality and welfare.

In February 2025, Sanna was elected City Council President. She was not elected on the first round and needed another round to achieve a majority. She also serves as chair of the welfare council.
