= Opinion polling for the 2021 Icelandic parliamentary election =

In the run up to the 2021 Icelandic parliamentary election, various organisations carried out opinion polling to gauge voting intention in Iceland during the term of the Althing. This article lists the results of such polls. The date range for these opinion polls is from the previous election, held on 28 October 2017, to the present day.

The 2021 elections were to be held on 25 September 2021. By law, the election had to be held on or before 23 October 2021. In July 2020, Prime Minister Katrín Jakobsdóttir proposed the date 25 September as the election date. The date of the election was officially published on 12 August.

Polls are listed in reverse chronological order, showing the most recent first and using the dates when the survey fieldwork was done, as opposed to the date of publication. Where the fieldwork dates are unknown, the date of publication is given instead. The highest figure in each polling survey is displayed with its background shaded in the leading party's colour. If a tie ensues, this is applied to the highest figures. When a poll has no information on a certain party, that party is instead marked by a dash (–).

== Graphical summary ==
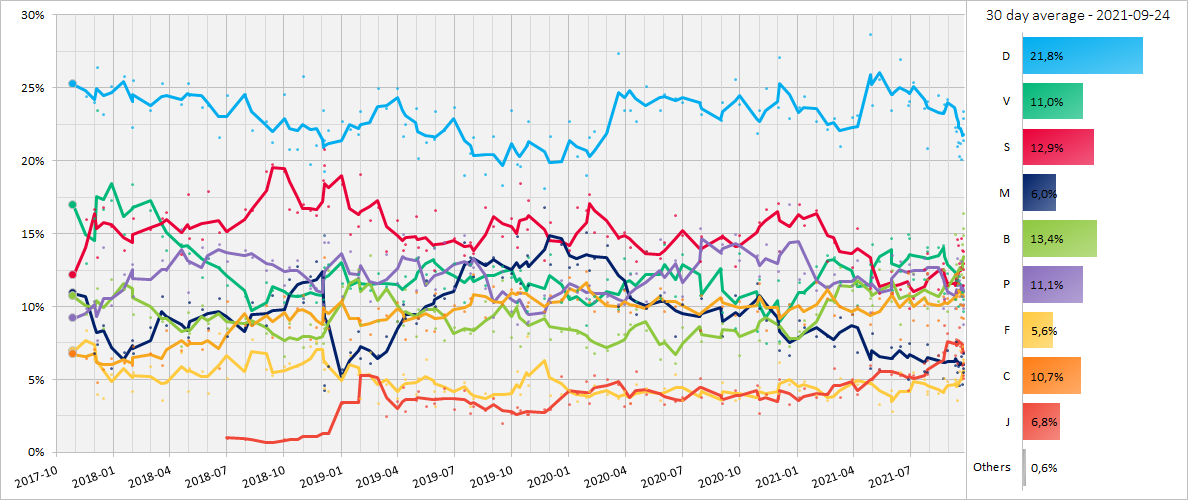

D = Independence Party, V = Left-Green Movement, S = Social Democratic Alliance, M = Centre Party, B = Progressive Party, P = Pirate Party, F = People's Party, C = Viðreisn, J = Socialist Party.

== Polls ==
Polling firm	Fieldwork date	Sample size	Resp.	D	V	S	M	B	P	F	C	J	Others	Lead
2021 parliamentary election	25 Sep 2021	–	–	24.4	12.6	9.9	5.4	17.3	8.6	8.8	8.3	4.1	0.5	7.1
Maskína	22–24 Sep 2021	5,836	TBA	21.4	10.5	13.8	5.5	15.4	10.2	6.2	10.1	6.1	0.8	6.0
Gallup	20—24 Sep 2021	4,809	—	23.4	12.0	12.6	6.8	14.9	8.8	6.4	9.2	5.3	0.6	8.5
MMR	22–23 Sep 2021	—	–	22.9	9.7	11.5	5.8	16.4	9.9	6.2	12.0	5.1	0.5	6.5
MMR	21–22 Sep 2021	909	–	21.8	11.0	13.9	4.7	14.3	10.7	7.3	10.1	6.0	0.2	7.5
Maskína	15–22 Sep 2021	TBA	TBA	20.6	11.5	11.7	7.1	13.4	11.3	5.6	11.4	6.6	0.8	7.2
Prósent	17–21 Sep 2021	2500	50	20.1	10.7	14.7	6.6	12.2	13.1	5.2	9.3	6.9	1.2	5.4
Gallup	13–19 Sep 2021	3,845	—	21.2	10.2	12.7	6.2	13.2	11.5	7.0	10.2	7.3	0.5	8.0
MMR	15–17 Sep 2021	1,257	–	20.3	12.1	13.0	4.6	12.7	11.8	5.6	10.7	8.6	0.6	7.6
Prósent	13–16 Sep 2021	1,493	–	21.3	10.0	14.2	5.9	12.6	11.5	4.7	11.6	7.7	0.5	7.1
Maskína	8–13 Sep 2021	TBA	TBA	21.0	11.5	14.6	5.5	12.0	13.3	3.6	12.3	6.1	–	6.4
Gallup	30 Aug–12 Sep 2021	5,828	51.1	22.0	11.8	11.0	7.6	12.9	11.0	4.9	9.9	7.8	1.1	10.2
MMR	8–10 Sep 2021	–	–	22.3	10.5	11.6	6.0	15.0	9.9	5.0	12.2	6.7	0.8	7.3
Gallup	15—29 Aug 2021	4,329	53.3	24.2	12.3	11.5	7.0	9.7	10.9	4.9	10.6	8.2	0.7	12.1
MMR	24 Aug 2021	–	–	23.9	10.9	10.5	6.2	12.5	10.6	5.1	10.4	8.7	1.2	11.3
Maskína	13–23 Aug 2021	822	TBA	23.4	14.2	13.0	5.1	12.6	9.9	4.2	10.7	6.9	–	8.8
Gallup	29 July–15 August 2021	6,238	—	24.5	14.1	11.2	6.7	10.4	12.6	4.1	9.1	6.7	0.6	10.4
Gallup	30 June–28 July 2021	3,800	—	24.1	13.8	12.3	7.4	11.9	12.2	4.0	8.7	5.4	0.2	10.3
Maskína	July 2021	TBA	TBA	20.9	14.1	13.7	5.5	9.9	12.7	4.2	12.3	6.3	–	6.8
Prósent	15–23 Jul 2021	2,600	–	23.6	11.9	12.6	5.6	10.6	13.3	5.0	10.1	6.1	1.2	10.3
MMR	24 Jun–6 Jul 2021	2,041	–	25.4	11.9	10.6	6.6	12.3	12.2	5.5	9.1	5.3	1.2	12.1
Gallup	1–29 June 2021	8,120	51.6	24.1	14.7	9.9	7.5	10.3	12.9	4.2	10.9	5.4	0.1	9.4
Maskína	June 2021	TBA	TBA	23.8	15.0	12.4	5.0	11.4	11.6	4.2	12.3	4.3	–	8.8
MMR	4–14 June 2021	973	–	27.0	12.4	11.2	7.3	8.8	13.1	5.5	7.8	5.3	1.6	13.9
MMR	25 May–1 June 2021	951	–	24.6	11.1	10.9	6.5	12.5	13.5	2.8	11.0	5.6	1.6	11.1
Gallup	1–31 May 2021	11,779	48.7	23.5	14.7	12.4	7.2	10.4	11.0	4.3	10.9	5.4	0.2	8.8
MMR	7–12 May 2021	953	–	25.6	13.1	10.9	5.7	12.6	11.3	3.3	10.6	5.7	1.2	12.5
MMR	21–28 April 2021	946	–	28.7	12.9	11.3	5.8	10.6	9.6	4.8	8.8	6.0	1.5	14.8
Gallup	Apr 2021	TBA	TBA	23.8	14.3	12.0	8.2	10.1	12.0	4.7	9.6	5.0	0.3	9.5
MMR	29 Mar–7 April 2021	940	–	23.1	10.1	15.4	6.9	11.5	13.2	4.7	10.0	4.0	1.0	7.7
Gallup	1-29 Mar 2021	9,856	53.0	23.0	12.3	12.7	9.5	11.1	11.5	5.0	9.5	5.0	0.4	10.3
MMR	5–10 Mar 2021	951	–	21.0	11.7	13.8	9.3	12.7	11.5	5.1	10.0	3.8	1.0	7.2
Gallup	1-28 Feb 2021	9,078	52.5	22.9	13.4	14.4	7.3	10.3	12.2	4.0	9.4	5.8	-	8.5
MMR	12–18 Feb 2021	919	–	22.2	13.5	13.1	8.0	11.4	11.4	3.6	10.6	4.1	2.0	8.7
Gallup	6–31 Jan 2021	9,019	51.4	22.7	12.8	16.6	8.0	9.5	11.1	3.9	11.7	3.8	–	6.1
MMR	30 Dec 2020–11 Jan 2021	2,002	-	24.4	10.9	15.6	8.6	9.1	12.3	4.9	8.8	4.4	1.0	8.8
Gallup	1 Dec 2020–3 Jan 2021	10,958	51.5	23.7	11.7	17.0	9.1	8.3	11.9	4.3	10.0	3.8	–	6.7
Zenter	11–19 Dec 2020	2,500	52.8	22.9	10.2	15.6	6.7	7.3	17.0	4.7	10.2	3.3	2.1	5.9
MMR	26 Nov–3 Dec 2020	944	-	27.1	7.6	13.8	7.0	7.5	13.8	6.2	9.5	5.0	2.3	12.3
Gallup	2–30 Nov 2020	9,351	53.6	23.7	11.8	17.1	8.8	8.6	12.4	4.1	9.7	3.7	–	6.6
MMR	6–11 Nov 2020	925	-	25.0	7.5	16.7	9.1	9.9	14.3	3.9	8.4	4.0	1.1	8.3
Gallup	30 Sep–1 Nov 2020	10,937	54.0	23.5	11.9	15.8	9.9	7.7	12.1	4.5	11.6	2.7	–	7.7
MMR	23–28 Oct 2020	933	-	21.9	8.3	15.2	11.6	10.2	13.5	3.8	9.7	4.6	1.3	6.7
Gallup	1–30 Sep 2020	9,673	52.9	23.9	13.7	14.9	9.4	6.7	13.2	3.7	10.4	3.9	–	9.0
Maskína	24–28 Sep 2020	879	TBA	22.7	10.4	17.9	5.9	7.8	15.7	5.5	14.0	–	–	5.2
MMR	10–23 Sep 2020	2,043	-	25.6	8.5	12.8	10.8	8.3	15.0	3.6	9.4	4.3	1.7	10.6
MMR	26 Aug–2 Sep 2020	929	-	24.0	9.6	14.9	8.0	8.9	14.3	4.8	10.0	3.4	2.2	9.1
Gallup	4–31 Aug 2020	9,479	51.9	22.8	12.6	14.7	9.9	7.9	13.7	3.6	10.6	3.9	0.3	8.1
Gallup	31 Jul 2020	-	-	23.2	10.9	14.8	10.6	7.6	13.9	4.3	10.8	3.8	0.1	8.4
MMR	23–28 Jul 2020	951	-	24.0	10.8	13.1	8.4	8.6	15.4	4.0	8.4	5.1	2.1	8.6
Gallup	02–30 Jun 2020	10,274	51.7	24.0	13.6	14.9	10.2	8.6	10.7	3.6	10.5	3.8	0.1	9.1
MMR	16–19 Jun 2020	1,045	-	24.3	10.7	16.3	8.0	6.1	13.2	5.4	10.0	3.5	2.4	8.0
Gallup	4 May–1 Jun 2020	10,630	54.0	24.6	14.3	14.4	10.4	7.7	11.0	4.4	9.7	3.3	–	10.2
MMR	19–25 May 2020	994	-	23.5	10.6	13.3	10.8	6.4	14.6	3.6	11.3	4.1	1.7	8.9
Gallup	30 Mar–3 May 2020	11,028	55.7	25.1	13.8	13.8	9.9	8.4	10.4	4.4	10.0	4.0	–	11.3
MMR	15–17 Apr 2020	1,051	-	22.7	10.4	13.1	9.5	9.8	12.3	4.7	10.0	5.6	2.0	9.6
MMR	3–7 Apr 2020	987	-	23.5	12.3	14.1	10.7	8.8	12.2	3.4	9.6	3.4	2.1	9.4
Gallup	2–29 Mar 2020	10,352	54.8	23.5	13.3	15.1	11.2	8.1	10.2	4.2	11.1	3.2	–	8.4
MMR	18–20 Mar 2020	1,034	-	27.4	9.8	14.7	10.0	8.1	10.2	3.7	9.7	4.7	0.5	12.7
Gallup	3 Feb–1 Mar 2020	7,964	53.8	22.0	11.9	14.8	14.2	7.0	10.7	4.0	10.3	5.0	1.9	7.2
MMR	6–10 Feb 2020	1,003	-	22.0	10.7	15.1	13.3	6.8	10.4	4.6	9.7	5.3	2.1	6.9
Gallup	03 Jan–02 Feb 2020	8,678	51.8	21.6	10.5	17.7	12.5	7.8	11.5	4.2	10.3	3.4	–	3.9
MMR	28 Jan 2020	-	-	19.0	8.7	16.6	15.1	7.2	10.6	3.8	12.4	4.9	1.9	2.4
MMR	3–13 Jan 2020	2,057	-	20.3	11.1	16.8	12.9	8.2	11.0	3.5	10.5	4.1	1.5	3.5
Gallup	2 Dec 2019–1 Jan 2020	8,511	52.8	22.7	10.7	13.9	12.7	8.6	11.3	4.3	12.0	3.3	–	8.8
MMR	13–19 Dec 2019	1,014	-	20.0	10.3	14.4	14.3	8.3	11.8	4.0	10.5	5.2	1.1	5.6
Gallup	28 Oct–1 Dec 2019	11,663	53.2	21.7	13.6	15.8	12.9	7.8	10.3	3.9	10.8	3.0	–	5.9
MMR	15–22 Nov 2019	1,061	-	18.1	10.6	13.2	16.8	9.4	10.8	6.3	9.7	3.0	2.2	1.3
Gallup	30 Sep–27 Oct 2019	9,798	-	22.7	13.4	17.3	11.5	8.2	9.0	4.6	10.3	2.6	–	5.4
MMR	21–25 Oct 2019	972	-	21.1	9.7	15.3	13.5	10.0	8.9	8.0	10.0	2.6	0.9	5.8
Zenter	10–14 Oct 2019	2,300	53	19.6	12.5	18.5	11.6	7.3	10.9	4.0	11.3	2.9	1.1	1.1
MMR	30 Sep–09 Oct 2019	2,124	-	19.8	10.3	14.1	14.8	10.1	8.8	5.6	11.0	3.1	2.4	5.0
Gallup	01–30 Sep 2019	-	-	23.5	12.0	16.1	12.3	7.9	9.7	4.3	11.2	2.7	–	7.4
MMR	09–16 Sep 2019	1,045	-	18.3	12.8	14.8	12.0	11.8	12.4	4.0	10.2	2.0	1.6	3.5
Gallup	29 Jul–01 Sep 2019	8,423	47.2	21.7	12.8	15.5	13.4	8.3	9.3	3.8	11.4	3.7	-	6.2
MMR	12–19 Aug 2019	990	-	19.1	11.5	16.8	13.0	10.4	11.3	4.1	9.3	2.9	1.6	2.3
Gallup	01–31 Jul 2019	-	-	21.6	12.0	13.7	12.1	8.5	12.7	3.7	12.2	3.2	–	7.9
Zenter	24–26 Jul 2019	2,000	45.0	20.5	12.9	14.4	13.4	8.2	12.3	3.2	10.6	2.7	1.9	6.1
MMR	04–17 Jul 2019	2,031	-	19.0	10.3	13.5	14.4	8.4	14.9	4.8	9.7	4.3	0.8	4.1
Gallup	31 May–30 Jun 2019	5,910	53.0	23.7	13.0	14.7	11.4	8.6	11.3	4.2	10.1	3.0	–	9.0
MMR	7–14 Jun 2019	988	–	22.1	11.3	14.4	10.6	7.7	14.4	4.2	9.5	4.4	1.3	7.7
Gallup	3–30 May 2019	6,125	53.5	23.4	12.4	16.6	10.0	8.5	11.2	3.2	10.9	3.7	0.1	6.8
MMR	23–29 May 2019	932	–	21.5	14.1	12.5	10.8	9.7	14.0	4.2	8.3	3.4	1.6	7.4
MMR	14–16 May 2019	978	–	21.3	12.2	13.9	11.8	11.6	9.8	6.4	8.4	3.2	1.4	7.4
MMR	30 Apr–3 May 2019	941	–	20.2	13.4	14.1	9.2	9.8	13.4	5.1	9.2	4.2	1.4	6.1
Gallup	5–30 Apr 2019	5,189	57.7	23.6	13.3	16.2	8.9	8.0	11.1	4.0	11.0	3.6	0.3	7.4
MMR	13 Apr 2019	–	–	22.5	12.1	14.3	9.2	11.2	13.3	5.0	7.8	2.8	1.7	8.2
MMR	4–9 Apr 2019	926	–	21.7	10.4	13.9	10.2	8.7	15.0	5.4	9.0	4.5	1.2	6.7
Gallup	1–31 Mar 2019	6,705	55.4	25.0	11.6	15.9	9.0	9.0	11.6	3.7	10.3	3.5	0.4	9.1
MMR	11–14 Mar 2019	1,025	–	23.6	11.4	13.8	8.0	11.1	13.6	4.7	9.4	2.5	1.9	9.8
Gallup	31 Jan–28 Feb 2019	7,060	53.5	25.0	12.3	16.8	6.7	9.0	11.6	3.4	9.9	5.0	0.3	8.2
MMR	11–15 Feb 2019	934	–	22.7	11.1	15.9	6.1	13.5	10.4	6.9	8.1	3.6	1.5	6.8
Gallup	7–31 Jan 2019	4,241	54.4	23.4	11.3	19.1	6.5	8.8	12.7	3.7	9.1	5.3	0.1	4.3
MMR	28 Jan 2019	–	–	21.8	12.2	15.5	8.3	12.6	12.0	5.4	9.2	–	3.1	6.3
MMR	4–14 Jan 2019	2,061	–	22.2	11.3	15.0	6.9	11.7	13.8	6.7	7.8	–	4.6	7.2
Gallup	3 Dec 2018–1 Jan 2019	4,899	58.0	22.7	11.6	18.4	5.7	11.4	10.7	5.3	10.5	3.4	0.3	4.3
MMR	5–11 Dec 2018	975	–	22.1	12.9	16.9	5.9	12.5	14.4	4.2	8.5	–	2.6	5.2
Zenter	3–4 Dec 2018	2,300	55	21.4	12.7	20.8	4.3	8.5	14.4	5.7	9.1	–	3.1	0.6
Maskína	30 Nov–3 Dec 2018	1,311	–	19.3	14.9	19.7	4.6	8.8	14.9	4.4	13.4	–	–	0.4
Gallup	3 Nov–2 Dec 2018	5,319	58.3	23.5	10.5	18.7	12.0	7.5	10.2	6.2	9.8	1.3	0.3	4.8
MMR	21 Nov 2018	–	–	21.1	10.3	16.3	13.1	7.5	11.3	7.6	8.6	–	4.2	4.8
MMR	8–12 Nov 2018	1,048	–	19.8	11.5	16.6	12.1	8.8	11.3	7.3	7.8	–	4.7	3.2
Gallup	2–31 Oct 2018	6,129	54.8	25.8	10.6	17.0	10.3	7.2	10.6	6.2	10.8	1.1	0.4	8.8
MMR	22 Oct 2018	–	–	20.8	10.8	16.5	12.8	7.8	13.2	5.9	9.9	–	2.3	4.3
MMR	3–9 Oct 2018	921	–	20.8	10.9	16.7	11.9	8.9	12.7	6.1	8.6	–	3.2	4.1
Gallup	3 Sep–1 Oct 2018	5,460	53.3	24.6	10.3	19.3	9.8	6.6	11.5	5.9	10.7	0.9	0.4	5.3
MMR	7–12 Sep 2018	953	–	21.3	11.1	19.8	10.8	8.1	13.2	5.3	7.9	–	2.5	1.5
Gallup	2 Aug–2 Sep 2018	7,094	52.6	22.7	11.7	19.3	8.7	8.2	12.5	5.7	10.1	0.7	0.4	3.4
MMR	10 Aug 2018	–	–	22.1	8.8	16.6	10.3	8.9	13.4	7.8	8.7	–	3.4	5.5
Gallup	29–30 Jul 2018	7,060	50.4	24.6	10.7	16.7	8.6	9.2	13.9	6.0	8.7	0.9	0.7	7.9
Gallup	31 May–1 Jul 2018	5,875	55.2	24.5	11.5	15.2	8.0	8.5	13.1	5.1	10.4	1.0	2.7	9.3
MMR	12–18 Jun 2018	925	–	21.6	12.7	15.1	10.6	9.5	14.3	8.2	5.8	–	2.2	6.5
Gallup	2–31 May 2018	7,113	56.6	23.8	13.3	17.9	8.5	8.9	13.3	4.1	8.4	–	1.8	5.9
MMR	16–22 May 2018	929	–	23.7	12.0	14.6	9.8	10.1	14.1	5.6	7.1	–	3.0	9.1
MMR	2 May 2018	–	–	24.5	13.7	14.7	10.3	8.2	13.0	5.8	7.6	–	2.1	9.8
Gallup	27 Mar–29 Apr 2018	6,766	56.3	25.3	14.1	17.7	7.9	9.6	11.0	4.2	7.7	–	2.5	7.6
MMR	13–19 Apr 2018	910	–	23.9	14.3	13.6	8.8	7.3	15.3	6.9	7.0	–	2.8	8.6
Gallup	1–26 Mar 2018	5,423	57.0	24.5	13.9	16.5	8.7	9.2	12.5	4.9	8.4	–	1.4	8.0
MMR	19 Mar 2018	–	–	25.3	14.8	16.1	10.7	9.0	13.2	3.6	6.0	–	1.4	9.2
MMR	12 Mar 2018	–	–	21.9	16.1	15.9	9.7	8.8	13.8	5.7	6.1	–	2.0	5.8
Gallup	1–28 Feb 2018	5,564	55.3	23.5	16.6	15.3	8.6	9.3	11.9	5.9	6.8	–	2.2	6.9
Gallup	4–31 Jan 2018	5,606	53.8	25.5	16.9	16.1	6.8	9.5	10.7	5.5	7.3	–	1.7	8.6
MMR	25–30 Jan 2018	928	–	22.3	18.4	14.9	7.7	11.2	12.9	4.2	6.0	–	2.4	3.9
MMR	9–17 Jan 2018	1,594	–	25.8	15.0	13.9	6.9	11.2	12.2	6.1	6.2	–	2.6	10.8
Gallup	30 Nov–28 Dec 2017	7,001	55.2	25.1	17.3	15.5	5.8	11.9	10.1	5.4	6.5	–	2.4	7.8
MMR	12–15 Dec 2017	923	–	23.2	16.7	16.8	8.7	8.5	14.1	3.7	5.7	–	2.5	6.4
Fréttablaðið/Stöð 2/Vísir	4 Dec 2017	804	–	26.4	23.5	13.4	7.4	11.3	7.7	4.0	4.8	–	1.5	2.9
Gallup	8–30 Nov 2017	3,991	57.8	24.0	16.1	16.7	6.8	10.4	10.4	6.4	7.1	–	2.1	7.3
MMR	14–17 Nov 2017	944	–	24.4	13.0	16.0	10.5	9.5	9.9	8.4	6.5	–	1.8	8.4
2017 parliamentary election	28 Oct 2017	–	–	25.2	16.9	12.1	10.9	10.7	9.2	6.9	6.7	–	1.5	8.4
