= Geirsnef =

Islet in Reykjavik, Iceland

Coordinates: 64°07′42″N 21°50′24″W

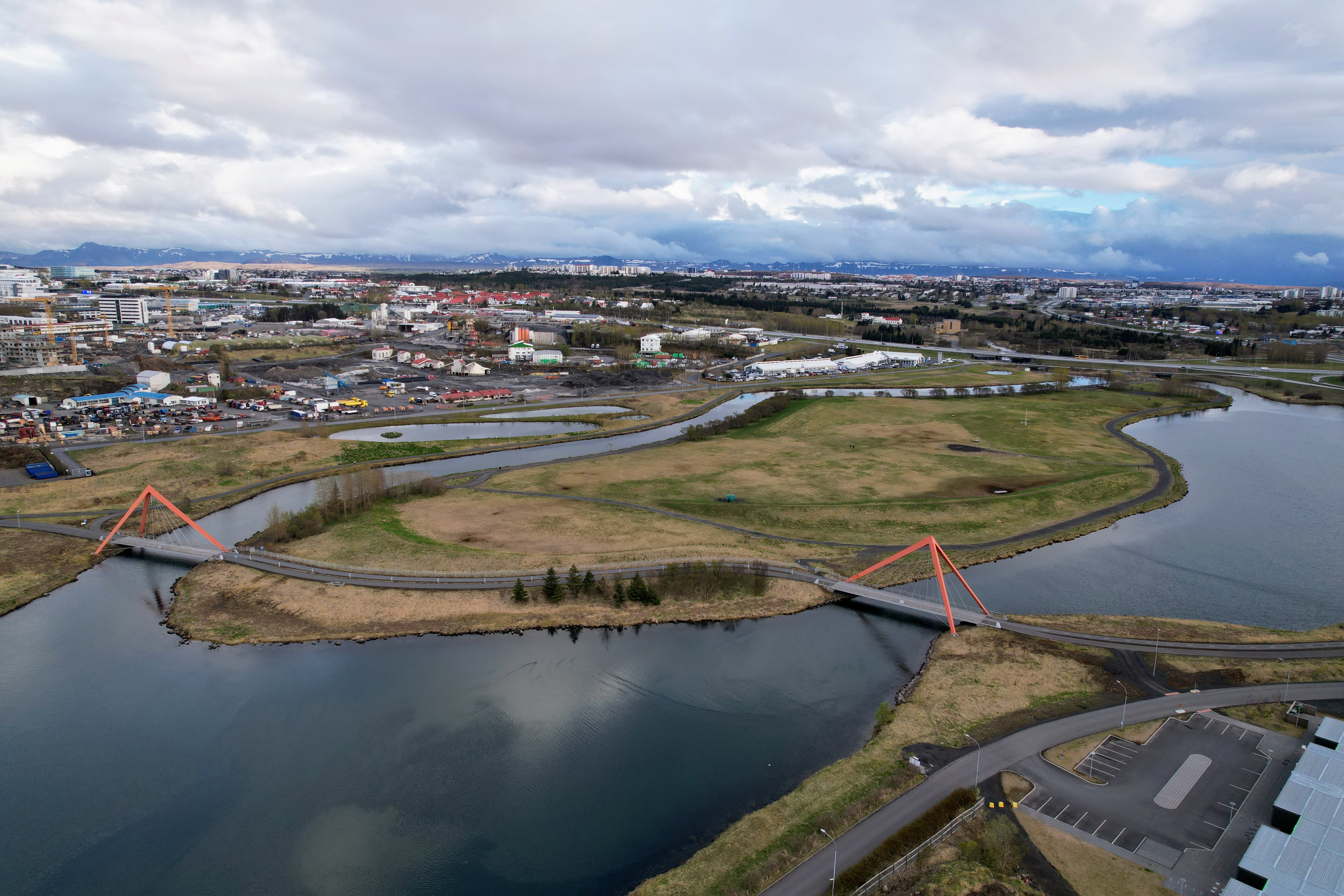
Geirsnef

Geirsnef is a small peninsula in Reykjavik, Iceland, that stands between east and west of Elliðaá, west of Gelgjutangi and east of Ártúnsholt.

== History ==
Geirsnef was first formed when a natural estuary was filled during Geir Hallgrímsson's tenure on the city council and was named for him. The area is primarily used as a dog park.
