= Sóley Tómasdóttir =

Icelandic politician (born 1974)

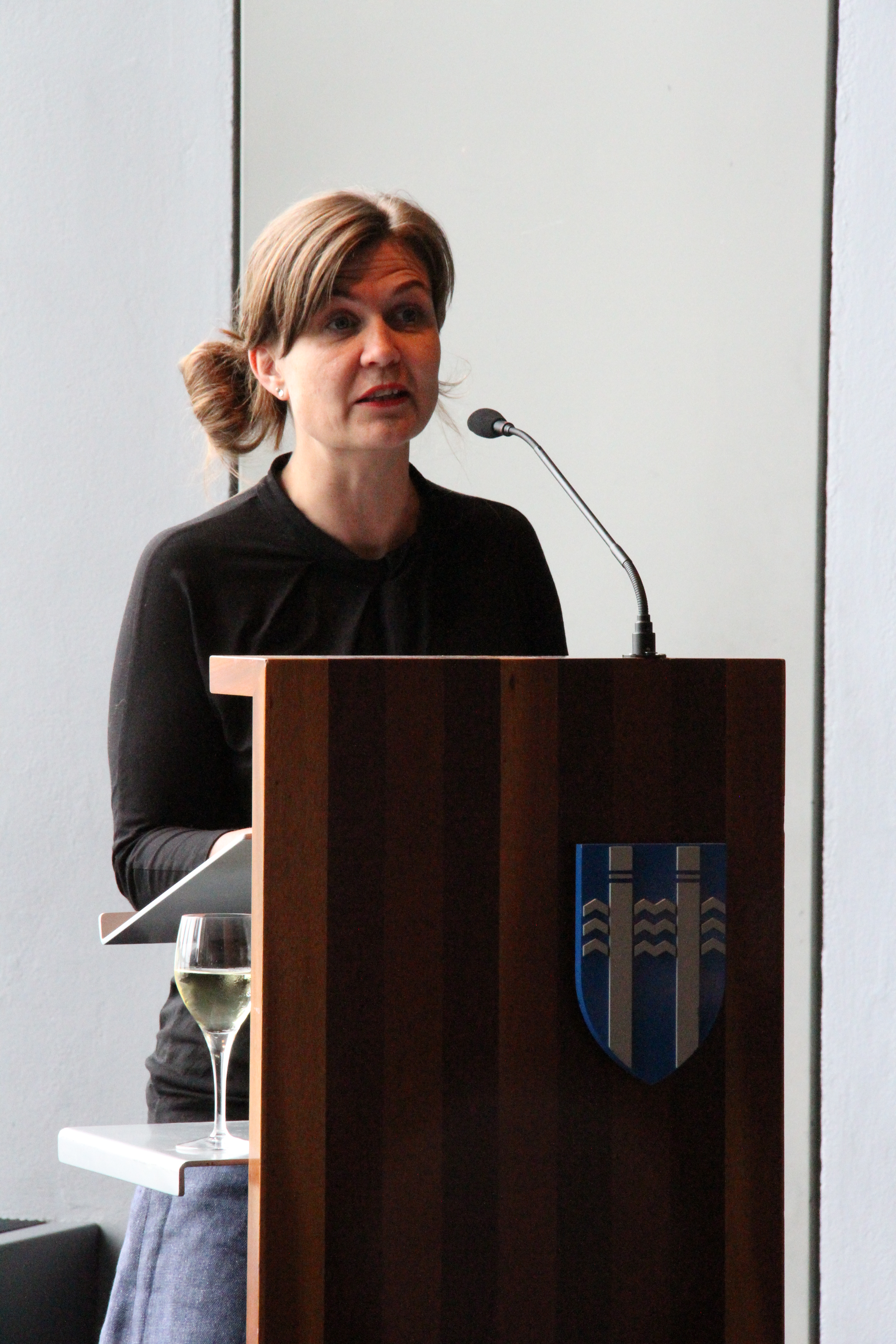
- Sóley in 2015

President of the Reykjavik City Council
- In office 2014–2016

Member of the Reykjavik City Council
- In office 2009–2016

Personal details
- Born: 12 May 1974 (age 52)
- Party: Left-Green Movement
- Education: Radboud University (BA, MSc)

Sóley Tómasdóttir (born 12 May 1974) is an Icelandic gender and diversity advocate and former politician. She was the leader of the Left-Green Movement in the Reykjavík City Council from 2009 to 2016 and the President of the City Council from 2014 to 2016.

== Biography ==
Sóley grew up mostly in Kópavogur but moved to Reykjavík in adolescence. She is a graduate of Menntaskólinn við Hamrahlíð, holds a BA degree in educational science and MSc degree in pedagogy, gender and diversity from Radboud University. Sóley has worked at the University of Iceland Institute of Social Sciences, the White House, the Creator's Advertising Agency and the sports and leisure area of the city of Reykjavík.

Sóley is married to Aart Schalk and has two children.

== Political career ==
Sóley was a vice City councillor from the spring of 2006, but served as a city representative when Svandís Svavarsdóttir was elected to the Althing (the Icelandic parliament) in the spring of 2009. She was re-elected to the City Council 2010 and 2014 as a representative of Left-Green Movement. Sóley was the secretary of the Left-Green Movement from 2007 to 2015. She has been in the city's most professional councils, but became president of the city council when four groups of the Social Democratic Alliance, Bright Future, Left Green and Pirate Party took office on 16 June 2014.

Sóley asked for a resolution in a meeting of the City Council on 20 September 2016 moved to the Netherlands with her husband and family.

== Gender and diversity advocate ==
In 2018, Sóley started JUST Consulting, which offers advice and trainings on gender and diversity management to organizations.
