= Oktavía Hrund Guðrúnar Jóns =

Icelandic politician

Leader of the Pirate Party
- Incumbent
- Assumed office 29 November 2025

Member of the Althing
- In office 2016–2021

Personal details
- Born: Oktavía Hrund Guðrúnar Jóns; 7 March 1979 (age 47) Breiðholt, Iceland
- Party: Pirate Party

Oktavía Hrund Guðrúnar Jóns (born 7 March 1979) is an Icelandic politician who is the first and current chairman of the Pirate Party.

== Biography ==
Oktavía grew up in Breiðholt but moved to Denmark at a young age and lived there for 30 years. Oktavía moved back to Iceland in 2016.

Oktavía had been the deputy city councilor for the Pirate Party and the executive director of their city council party. In 2016, Oktavía was a deputy member of parliament for the Pirate Party in the Southern Constituency. Oktavía served on the Pirate Party board in 2017 and was chairman of the European Pirate Party from 2017 to 2018.

Oktavía ran for chairman of the Pirate Party when the party decided to adopt a chairmanship instead of a decentralized leadership. Oktavía won the chairmanship election on 29 November 2025 with 95 votes against 79 votes received by Alexandra Briem. Oktavía is the first transgender political leader in Iceland. She left the parliament in 2021.
