= Sæþór Benjamín Randalsson =

Icelandic trade unionist and politician

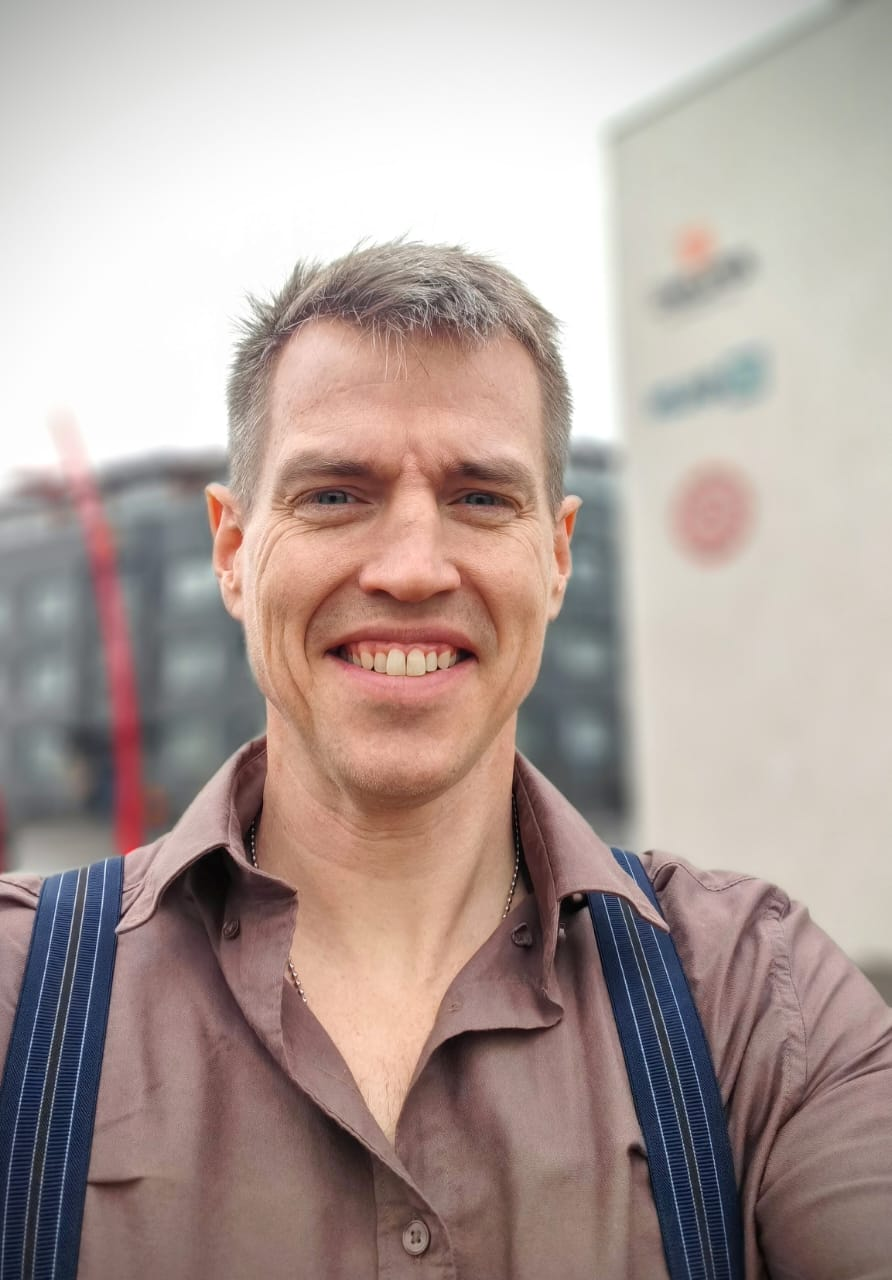
- Sæþór Benjamín Randalsson in 2026

Leader of the Icelandic Socialist Party
- In office 24 May 2025 – 7 June 2026
- Preceded by: Sanna Magdalena Mörtudóttir
- Succeeded by: Jón Ferdínand Estherarson

Personal details
- Born: 1981 (age 44–45) United States
- Party: Socialist Party of Iceland

Sæþór Benjamín Randalsson (born 1981) is an Icelandic trade unionist and politician. He was the chairman of the executive committee of the Socialist Party of Iceland. He is a board member of the Efling stéttarfélag.

== Biography ==
He was born in the United States and moved to Iceland around 2008.

Sæþór joined the Socialist Party of Iceland in 2018. At the party's general meeting on 24 May 2025, he was elected chairman of the executive committee, replacing Gunnar Smári, who had held the position since the party's founding.

At the same general meeting, Sanna Magdalena Mörtudóttir was elected political leader of the party, but she resigned two days later, on 26 May 2025. Sæþór since served as the party's leader. In June 2026, he was replaced as leader by Jón Ferdínand Estherarson. Sæþór was elected vice chairman of the party.

== Trade unionist ==
Sæþór is a trade unionist and was elected as an alternate to the board of directors of Efling stéttarfélag in 2022 on the B-list led by Sólveig Anna Jónsdóttir. He then became a member of the board and chairman of the company's labor dispute fund for the 2024–2026 term.

== Personal life ==
Sæþór was raised in the United States and is an Icelandic citizen.
