= Tómasdóttir =

Tómasdóttir is an Icelandic patronymic, literally meaning "daughter of Tómas". In Icelandic names, this is not a family name. Notable people with the name include:

- Halla Tómasdóttir (born 1968), Icelandic businessperson
- Karitas Tómasdóttir (born 1995), Icelandic footballer
- Sigríður Tómasdóttir (1874–1957), Icelandic environmentalist
- Sóley Tómasdóttir (born 1974), Icelandic politician
