= 2022 Icelandic municipal elections =

Municipal election in Iceland

- 14 May 2022
Party	Seats	+/–
Independence	113	−5
Progressive	69	+23
Social Democratic	26	−3
Left-Green	9	+1
Centre	6	−3
Viðreisn	5	−1
Pirates	4	+1
People's	2	+1
Socialist	2	+1
This lists parties that won seats. See the complete results below.

Municipal elections took place in Iceland on 14 May 2022 to elect 64 municipal councils, including 5 councils for municipalities that will be formed after the elections as several municipal mergers take effect. The general method used for the election of the councils is party-list proportional representation if two or more party lists are presented for the elections. 49 municipal councils will be elected in that manner. In two municipalities, only a single list was presented, meaning that the candidates on that list are elected to the municipal council without a vote. In the remaining 13 municipalities, no list of candidates was presented. Municipal councils in those municipalities will be elected using a form of plurality block voting were voters write in the names of their preferred candidates.

The largest Icelandic municipality by far is the capital city of Reykjavík with 36% of the population. 11 parties competed in the elections for the 23 seats on the Reykjavík City Council.

== Results ==
=== Overall ===
Party	Seats	+/–
Independence Party	113	–5
Progressive Party	69	+23
Social Democratic Alliance	26	–3
Left-Green Movement	9	+1
Centre Party	6	–3
Reform Party	5	–1
Pirate Party	4	+1
People's Party	2	+1
Icelandic Socialist Party	2	+1
Other party lists	165	–34
Independents	69	–13
Total	470	–32
