= Gunnhildur Fríða Hallgrímsdóttir =

Icelandic politician (born 2002)

Personal details
- Born: 1 May 2002 (age 24)
- Party: Pirate Party
- Education: Harvard University

Gunnhildur Fríða Hallgrímsdóttir (born 1 May 2002) is an Icelandic politician and activist. In December 2021, she became the youngest Icelandic parliamentarian in the history of Alþingi when she took a seat as a deputy member for the Pirate Party at the age of 19.

As of 2021, she is a student at Harvard University.
