= Alexandra Briem =

Icelandic politician (born 1983)

Alexandra Briem (born 1983) is an Icelandic politician. She has served as President of the Reykjavík City Council since 2021. She is a member of the Pirate Party.

Alexandra was born in Reykjavík. Her parents are both members of the punk-pop band Fræbbblarnir.

Alexandra was initially a customer service representative for Síminn, Iceland's largest telecommunications company. She joined the Pirate Party in 2014 and campaigned for them in the 2017 parliamentary election. She was appointed to the third position on the party's electoral list in the 2018 Reykjavík City Council elections and became the first deputy councillor for the party at the end of the elections. She was a deputy councillor until May 2021, when she became a councillor and President of the Council, and along with it the first transgender person to hold political office in Iceland.
