= 2018 Icelandic municipal elections =

Municipal election in Iceland

← 2014	26 May 2018	2022 →

Municipal elections took place in Iceland on 26 May 2018. 55 of the 72 municipal councils in the country were elected using open list PR. The rural municipality Tjörneshreppur did not hold an election as only one list was presented, whose candidates were thereby automatically elected. No list was presented in 16 municipalities. Municipal councils in those municipalities were elected using a form of plurality block voting were voters write in the names of their preferred candidates. Two of the municipal councils were for new municipalities created after mergers.

== Results ==
Party	Seats	+/–
Independence Party	118	–2
Progressive Party	46	-10
Social Democratic Alliance	29	-6
Centre Party	9	New
Left-Green Movement	8	-1
Viðreisn	6	New
Pirate Party	3	+2
People's Party	1	New
Icelandic Socialist Party	1	New
Other party lists	199	+21
Independents	82	-12
Total	502	-2
Source: Statistics Iceland, Statistics Iceland
