= Guðrún Jónasson =

Icelandic shopkeeper and politician (1877–1958)

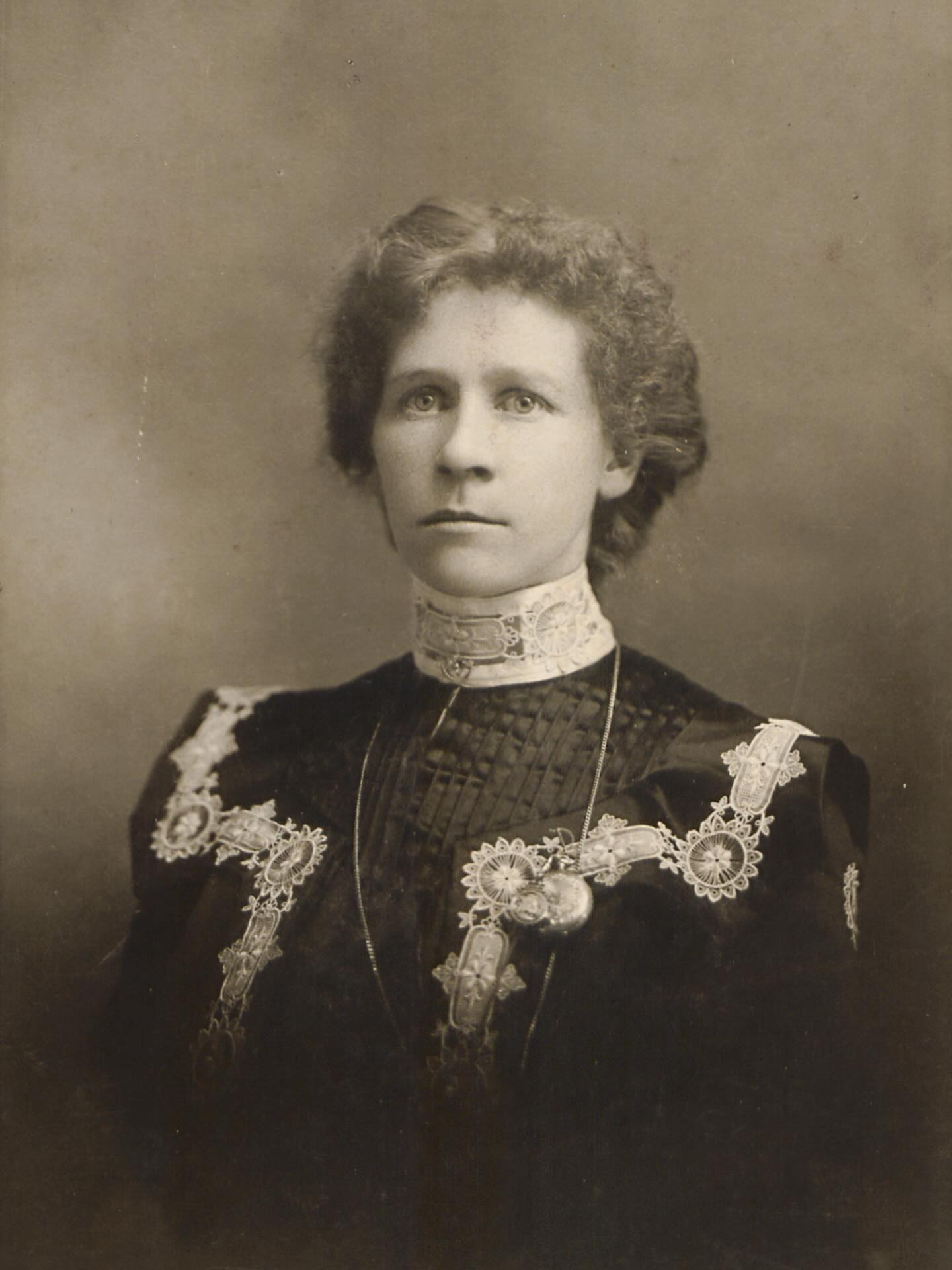

Town councillor for Reykjavík City Council
- In office 1928–1946

Vice-town councillor for Reykjavík City Council
- In office 1946–1954

Personal details
- Born: Guðrún Pétursdóttir; 8 February 1877 Felli, Biskupstungum, Árnessýsla, Danish Iceland
- Died: 5 October 1958 (aged 81) Reykjavík, Iceland
- Party: Independence Party
- Spouse: Jónas Jónasson (died)
- Domestic partner: Gunnthórunn Halldórsdóttir
- Children: 3
- Profession: Shopkeeper
- Awards: Order of the Falcon, Grand Cross

Guðrún Jónasson (née Pétursdóttir; 8 February 1877 – 5 October 1958) was an Icelandic shopkeeper and Independence Party politician. Jónasson served as a Town councillor and later Vice-town councillor for Reykjavík City Council from 1928 to 1954.

== Career ==
She was elected to the Reykjavík City Council in 1928 for the Independence Party serving as the town councillor until 1946 and the vice-town councillor representative until 1954. She was a member of the poor and support committee, the child protection committee, the road committee, the water committee, the health committee, the epidemic prevention committee, the fire committee, the education committee and restaurant licensing committee. She also served on the board of the Reykjavík Housewives' School.

She was the first chairman of the women's department of the Icelandic Accident Prevention Association. She was awarded the Grand Cross of the Icelandic Order of the Falcon from the President of Iceland Ásgeir Ásgeirsson for her work in the association.

== Personal life ==
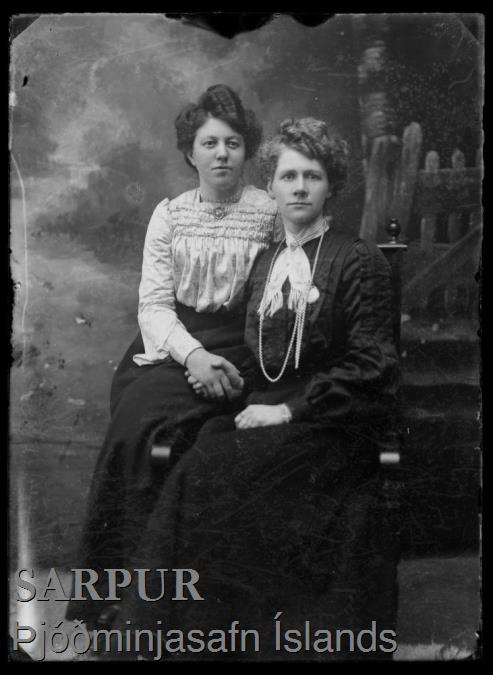
Gunnþórunn Halldórsdóttir and Guðrún Jónasson

Guðrún Pétursdóttir was born on 8 February 1877 in Felli, Biskupstungum to parents Pétur Einarsson and Halla Magnúsdóttir. When she was 11, she and her parents migrated to Winnipeg in Manitoba, Canada. While there, she married theatre owner Jónas Jónasson, taking his last name in the marriage. Magnúsdóttir died around 1900, with Einarsson and Jónasson returning to Iceland in 1904. They stayed with actress Gunnthórunn Halldórsdóttir and Halldórsdóttir's mother at Amtmannstígur, Reykjavík. Halldórsdóttir and her mother then demolished the house to build a bigger one. Halldórsdóttir and Jónasson opened a textile shop and raised three foster children together. Jónasson died on 5 October 1958, with Halldórsdóttir dying on 15 February 1959.

When the two were alive, Guðrún and Gunnþóran's relationship was described as friends, sisters, sisters-in-law, partner sister, and girlfriends, with the pair describing themselves in a letter to one of their grandchildren as '[their] grandmothers'.
