= Helgi Hrafn Gunnarsson =

Icelandic politician (born 1980)

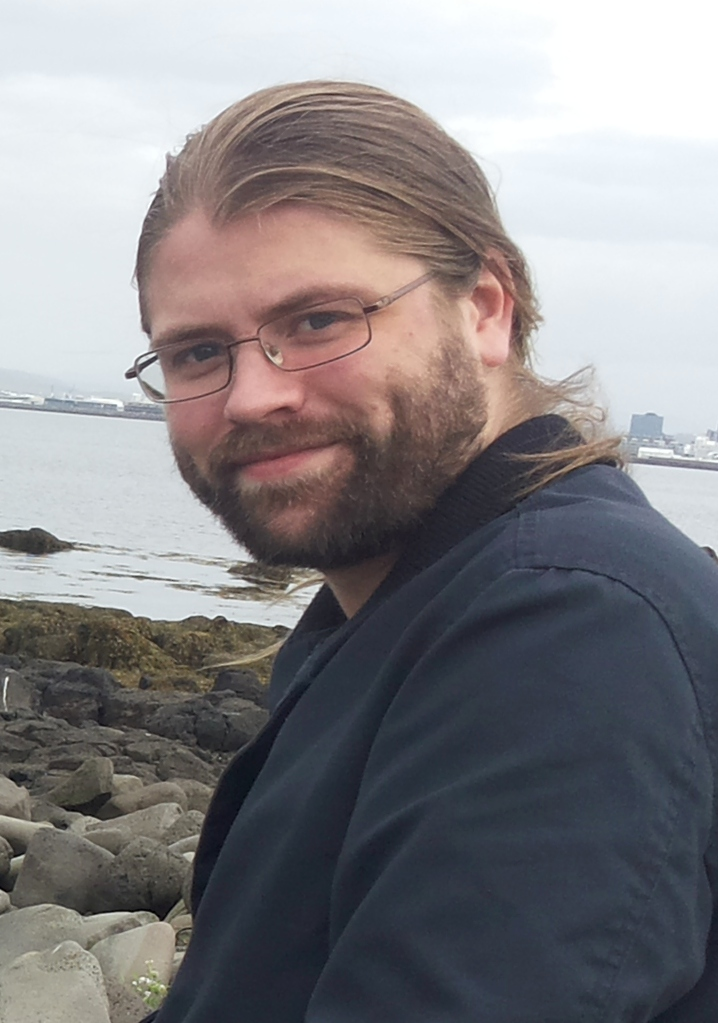

Member of Parliament
- Constituency: Reykjavík North
- In office 2017–2021
- In office 2013–2016

Personal details
- Born: 22 October 1980 (age 44); Reykjavík, Iceland
- Political party: Pirate Party

Helgi Hrafn Gunnarsson (born 22 October 1980) is an Icelandic former member of parliament representing Reykjavik Constituency North. He is a member of the Icelandic Pirate Party. First elected in 2013, he did not contest the 2021 election.
