= 2026 Icelandic municipal elections =

Municipal election in Iceland

- 16 May 2026

Municipal elections were held in Iceland on 16 May 2026.

== By municipality ==
- 2026 Reykjavík City Council election
