= Gelgjutangi =

Peninsula in southwestern Iceland

Coordinates: 64°08′06″N 21°50′20″W

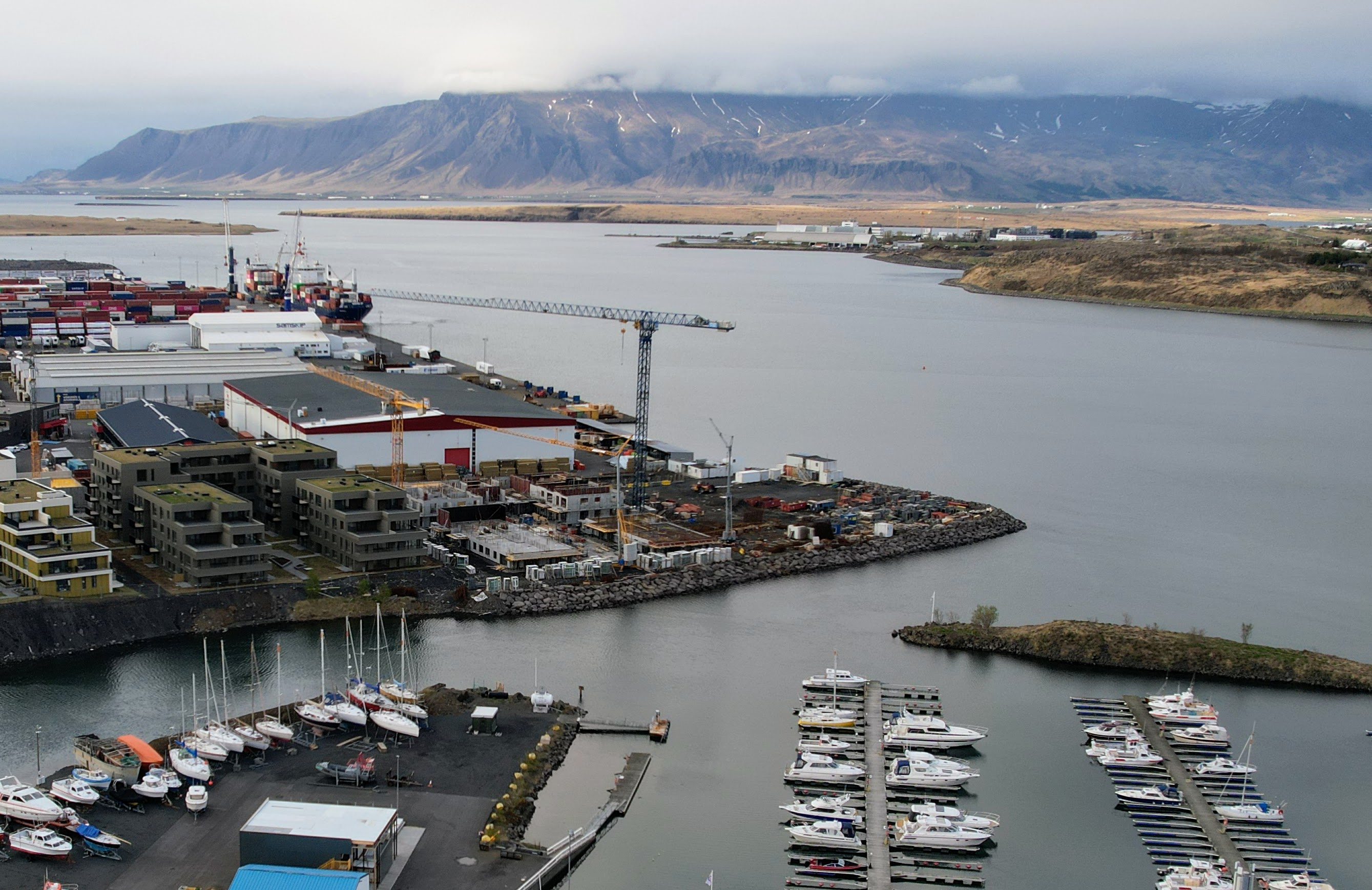
Gelgjutangi

Gelgjutangi is a small peninsula on the Elliðaá river, in eastern Reykjavik, Iceland. Geirsnef, a small islet is located to the south of the peninsula.

== History ==
In 1935, a number of fossils were discovered at Gelgjutangi.
