= Guðrún Pétursdóttir =

Icelandic physiologist (born 1950)

Guðrún Pétursdóttir (born 14 December 1950) is an Icelandic physiologist, associate professor of embryology and physiology at the University of Iceland's Faculty of Nursing and director of the Sæmundar Institute for Sustainable Development and Interdisciplinary Research at the University of Iceland.
