= Thordis Loa Thorhallsdottir =

Local politician in Reykjavík, Iceland

Thordis Loa Thorhallsdottir Þórdís Lóa Þórhallsdóttir

Deputy Mayor of Reykjavík City
- Incumbent
- Assumed office 19 June 2018

member of the Reykjavík City Council
- Incumbent
- Assumed office 19 May 2018

Chair of the City Executive Council
- In office 19 June 2018 – 7 June 2022

Personal details
- Born: 7 December 1965 (age 60) Selfoss, Iceland
- Party: Viðreisn

Thordis Loa Thorhallsdottir (Icelandic spelling: Þórdís Lóa Þórhallsdóttir; born 7 December 1965) is an Icelandic politician and the deputy mayor of Reykjavík City. She is also a city councillor for Viðreisn and the chairperson of the council's executive committee.

== Early life and education ==
Thordis Loa was born in Selfoss on December 7, 1965. Her father, Þórhallur Geirsson, was a driver and supply manager, while her mother, Hjördís Geirsdóttir, was a popular singer. Thordis Loa grew up with her three siblings in the neighbourhood of Breiðholt in Reykjavík, attending the local schools Breiðsholtsskóli and Seljaskóli and taking further education at Breiðholt Fjölbrautaskólinn. In 1983, while a teenager, she lived in Guayaquil in Ecuador as an American Field Service foreign exchange student, attending Colegio La Inmaculada.

Thordis Loa was active in sport as a teenager playing and competing in Handball and downhill skiing with local sport club Íþróttafélag Reykjavíkur as well as being active scout with Icelandic Scouts.

In 1991 Thordis Loa attended Loyola University New Orleans studying Television Broadcast Production in Loyola's Media department. She graduated with a BA in sociology from University of Iceland in 1995 and an MSW in Social Work in 1996. In 2003 she completed MBA studies at Reykjavík University and in 2015 she graduated with Diploma in Corporate Governance from University of Iceland (Center for Good Corporate Governance).

== Career ==
Thordis Loa began her career in the '80s as highland tour guide and a teenage consultant during her university years. In 1998 she became the managing director of Service of the Elderly within the City of Reykjavík, later becoming the Vice President of the Service Department for the Social Service of Reykjavík. During the years 1998 to 2007 she was a part-time professor at the University of Iceland.

In 2005 Thordis Loa changed her career and became a business entrepreneur and owner of Pizza Hut Iceland and Pizza Hut Finland. She was the chairman of the Finnish-Icelandic Chamber of Commerce. During the years 2005 to 2015 Thordis Loa was active in international business, participating in a startup of Jogo Yogurt bar chain in Helsinki and more. In 2015–2016 Thordis Loa hosted the weekly TV show "Loa & Life" at Hringbraut. In 2016 Thordis Loa went back to tourism in Iceland with Gray Line Iceland.

Thordis Loa has been a popular keynote speaker, host or a panelist, and has held positions on a wide range of boards of companies and associations.

She was awarded a TIAW world of difference award in Washington DC 2011 and received First Class Cross in 2013.

In March 2018 it was announced that Thordis Loa would lead Viðreisn in the upcoming City Council elections, held in Reykjavik in May the same year where Viðreisn got two council seats out of 23. Since then, Thordis Loa has served as a city councilor and deputy Mayor in Reykjavik.

== Public influence ==
Thordis Loa is an active advocate for diversity and empowerment of women in business and media. In 2008 Thordis Loa started along with twenty other women business entrepreneurs an Investment Company Naskar Investments. She has been the chairman of Naskar Investments since 2009. Thordis Loa has been active in increasing women's voice and emphasis on diversity in business in Iceland and Finland. Actively participated with the Association of Women Business Leaders (FKA) Thordis Loa hold the position as the chairman of FKA during the years 2013–2017. Participating in implementing the gender law quota for diversity on boards in Iceland in 2013 and leading a national project within FKA of more visibility of women in media, writing articles in the press, publishing in books (ath line a bókina) and attending media events, interviews and conferences to advocate public discussion on equal visibility for the gender in society. During the years 2009–2017 Thordis Loa was on the list of 100 most powerful women in Iceland, published by Frjáls verslun.

== Awards and recognitions ==
- 2011: Received a TIAW world of difference award in Washington DC in October 2011, being recognized as one of 100 extraordinary women from around the world who have contributed to the economic empowerment of women.
- 2013: Order of the Lion of Finland Cross, First Class for her work as the chairman of the Board of the Finnish Icelandic Chamber of Commerce and for leading business relationship and networking between Finland and Iceland.
- 2016: EMBLA of the year.
