= Heiða Björg Hilmisdóttir =

Icelandic politician (born 1971)

23rd Mayor of Reykjavík
- In office 21 February 2025 – 2 June 2026
- Preceded by: Einar Þorsteinsson
- Succeeded by: Hildur Björnsdóttir

Vice leader of the Social Democratic Alliance
- In office 4 February 2017 – 28 October 2022
- Preceded by: Logi Már Einarsson
- Succeeded by: Guðmundur Árni Stefánsson

Personal details
- Born: 21 February 1971 (age 55) Akureyri, Iceland
- Party: Social Democratic Alliance
- Spouse: Hrannar Björn Arnarsson
- Children: 4

Heiða Björg Hilmisdóttir (born 21 February 1971) is an Icelandic politician and the Mayor of Reykjavík since 21 February 2025. Heiða served as the vice chairman of the Social Democratic Alliance from February 2017 until October 2022. She is the former chair of the party's women's movement and she is a city councillor in Reykjavík.

== Political career ==
Heiða was the chair of the Women's Movement in the Social Democratic Alliance from 2013 to 2015. She took a seat on Reykjavík City Council in 2015, where she has been on the executive board of the city. Heiða has been the chair of the Reykjavík Violence Prevention Committee since its establishment, which was approved at a women's celebration meeting of the city council on the occasion of the 100th anniversary of women's suffrage on 31 March 2015.

Heiða was second on Samfylkingin's list in the 2018 city council elections, and was elected chair of the Reykjavík Welfare Council at a meeting of the city council on 19 June 2019. Heiða became vice-chair of the Association of Local Authorities in Iceland in 2018. She is a member of the board of Félagsbústaðir, a social housing company, and is vice president for ECAD, European Cities Action Network for Drug Free Societies. Heiða is the vice president of the Icelandic Association of Local Authorities and is on the policy committee of the Council of European Municipalities and regions.

Heiða is a representative in the Presidency of the Party of European Socialists, which holds strategic discussions on progressive priorities for the future of Europe.

Heiða was elected chair of the executive board of the party on 4 June 2016, and elected vice-chair of the Social Democratic Alliance on 4 February 2017, but the party had just emerged from the parliamentary elections in which the party received only 5.7% of the vote. She has been re-elected twice, first in 2018 and then in 2020. Heiða is a feminist and took an active part in the #metoo movement in Iceland and was the spokesperson for women in politics under the hashtag #ískuggavaldsins. Welfare politics outside Iceland.

== Professional life ==
Before taking a seat on the city council, Heiða worked as the head of the food and nutrition services at Landspítali University hospital. She was the Vice-Chair of the MS Association in Iceland, the vice chair and later Chair of the Nordic MS Association, the Chair of the Iceland Nutrition Society and a member of the Representative Council of the European Federation of the Associations of Dietitians.

She has covered food and nutrition in the media, worked as a journalist, taught at the University of Iceland, and she is a published author of two cookbooks: Samlokur, with Bryndís Eva Birgisdóttir, and Af bestu lyst 4.

== Education ==
Heiða is educated as a dietitian and administrative dietitian, and has a M.Sc. in nutrition management from the University of Gothenburg in Sweden. She has an executive MBA degree from Reykjavík University and a diploma in positive psychology from the University of Iceland.
