= 2014 Icelandic municipal elections =

- 31 May 2014

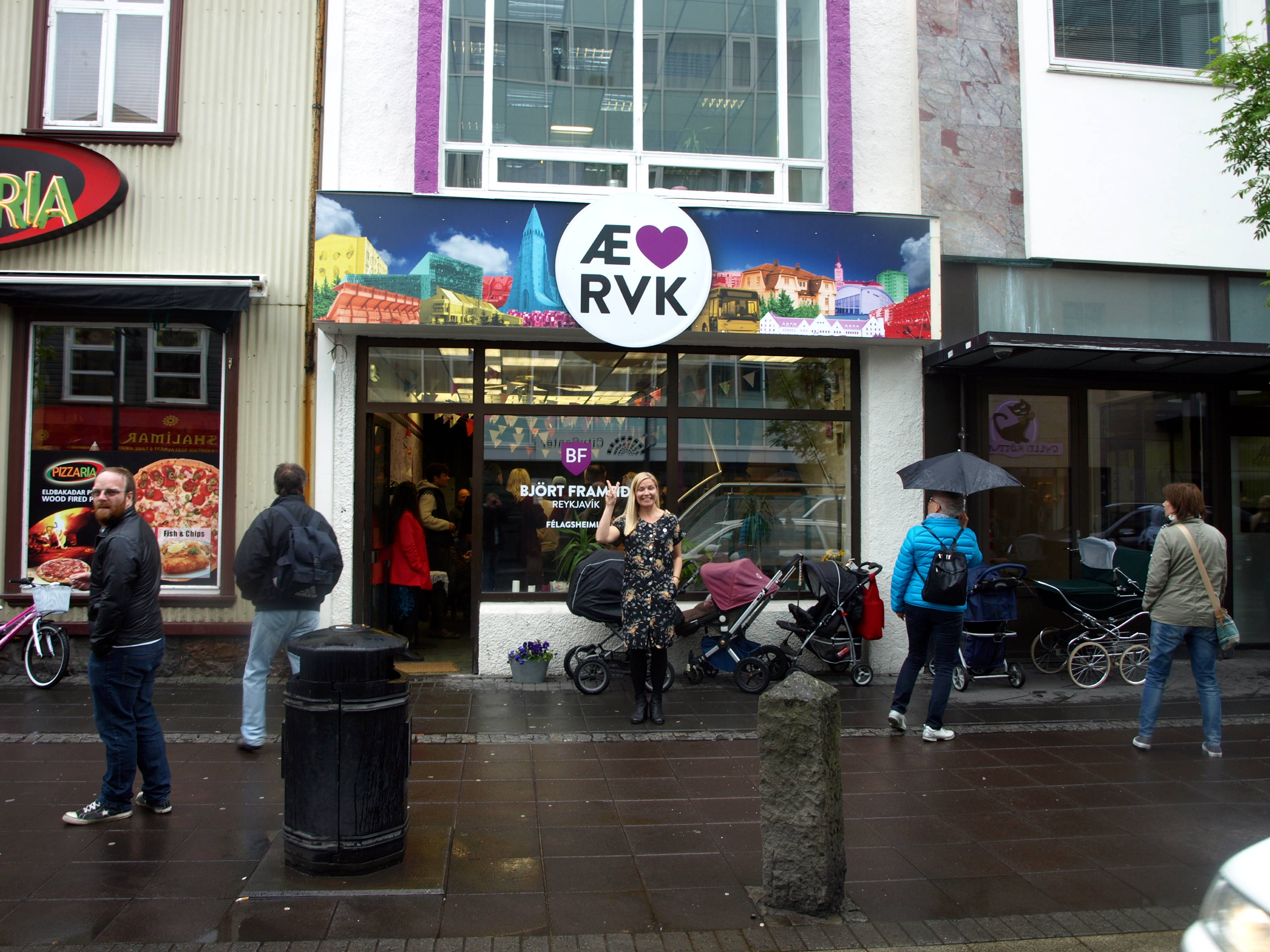
Eva Einarsdóttir campaigning

Municipal elections took place in Iceland on 31 May 2014. 66% of eligible voters cast votes, the lowest proportion since Iceland gained independence.

As part of a pledge, Mayor Jón Gnarr's Best Party did not participate in the election and was dissolved after the election was held.

== Results ==
=== Overall ===
Party	Seats	+/–
Independence Party	120	+3
Progressive Party	56	+5
Social Democratic Alliance	35	-7
Bright Future	11	New
Left-Green Movement	9	-6
Pirate Party	1	+1
Liberal Party	0	-1
Other party lists	178	-14
Independents	94	0
Total	504	-8
Source: Statistics Iceland, Statistics Iceland

== Results in Reykjavík ==
Party	Votes	%	Seats	+/–
Social Democratic Alliance	17,426	31.89	5	+2
Independence Party	14,031	25.68	4	–1
Bright Future	8,539	15.63	2	New
Progressive Party	5,865	10.73	2	+2
Left-Green Movement	4,553	8.33	1	0
Pirate Party	3,238	5.93	1	New
Dawn	774	1.42	0	New
People's Front of Iceland	219	0.40	0	New
Total	54,645	100.00	15	0
Valid votes	54,645	96.04		
Invalid/blank votes	2,251	3.96		
Total votes	56,896	100.00		
Source: Visir

In total, 56,896 votes were cast. Of these, 2,024 were blank and 227 were invalid.

On 11 June 2014, a coalition was announced of the Social Democrats, Bright Future, the Left-Greens, and the Pirate Party. Dagur B. Eggertsson, of the Social Democrats, became the new mayor, while the Left-Green councillor Sóley Tómasdóttir became president of the city council and Sigurður Björn Blöndal of Bright Future became the city council chairperson. The coalition did not invite Progressive Party councillors onto the city’s councils and committees, with Sóley Tómasdóttir saying that the party was not “suitable” for the jobs; this has been taken partly to relate to the councillors' opposition to the Reykjavík Mosque.
