= Gunnar Smári =

Icelandic journalist, publisher, and editor

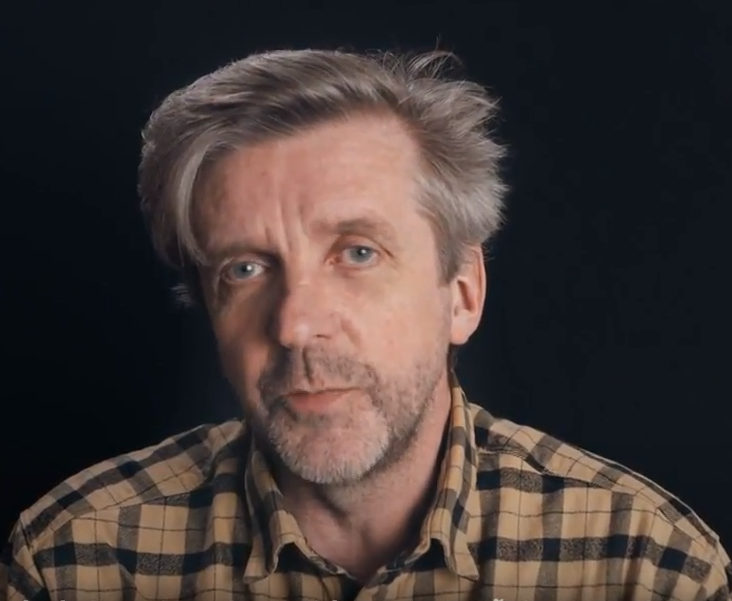

Leader of the Socialist Party of Iceland
- In office 1 May 2017 – October 2024
- Preceded by: Party established
- Succeeded by: Sanna Magdalena Mörtudóttir

Personal details
- Born: 11 January 1961 (age 65) Hafnarfjörður, Iceland
- Citizenship: Icelandic
- Party: Socialist Party

Gunnar Smári Egilsson (born 11 January 1961) is an Icelandic journalist, publisher, and editor. He was one of the founders of Fréttablaðið and the weekly Eintak and Morgunpóstur as well as editing the weekly Pressan. In addition, he was one of the founders and publishers of Nyhedsavisen, which was published in Denmark on the model of Fréttablaðið, and one of the owners and editors of Fréttatíminn.

Smári has held various other positions and was, among other things, the managing director of SÁÁ for a time. In 2014 established Fylkisflokkurinn (lit: “The County Party), a group that advocated for the unification of Norway and Iceland. Gunnar wrote various articles where he called that Iceland became one of Norway's counties, for the abolition of the presidency and replacing it with a governor, that Icelandic would become an official language of Norway, and that the Icelandic flag would become the county flag. Gunnar later founded Socialist Party of Iceland political party in 2017.
