= Socialist Party of Iceland =

Socialist Party of Iceland Sósíalistaflokkur Íslands
- Abbreviation: SFÍ
- Leader: Jón Ferdínand Estherarson
- Founder: Gunnar Smári
- Founded: 1 May 2017
- Headquarters: Bolholt 6, 104 Reykjavík
- Youth wing: ROÐI - Ungir Sósíalistar
- Pensioners' wing: Sósíalistar 55+
- Ideology: Socialism; Democratic socialism; Anti-neoliberalism
- Political position: Left-wing
- Colours: Red
- Althing: 0 / 63
- Reykjavík City Council: 1 / 23

Election symbol

Website
- sosialistaflokkurinn.is

The Socialist Party of Iceland (Note: also translated as the Icelandic Socialist Party) (Icelandic: Sósíalistaflokkur Íslands, SFÍ) is a socialist political party in Iceland, which was founded on International Workers' Day on 1 May 2017.

== History ==
According to Gunnar Smári the party already had 1,400 members at its foundation. At the beginning of May, a temporary board was selected at a meeting to prepare a "Socialist Congress" in the autumn of 2017. Prior to the Congress the party selected four committees among its members by sortition, responsible for healthcare, housing, social welfare, and democratization of society.

The party did not contest the 2017 Althing elections, as it declared itself to be in a "build-up phase", but ran lists in Reykjavík and Kópavogur municipalities in the municipal elections on 26 May 2018. In Reykjavík, they received one of 23 seats with 6.4% of the vote.

In the 2024 parliamentary election, the leading candidate of the Socialist Party is Sanna Magdalena Mörtudóttir.

== Ideology and policies ==
The architect behind the party is the editor and author Gunnar Smári, who at the launching of the party declared that it should be "an advocate for wage earners and all those who are poor, invisible and powerless. The opponents of the Socialist Party are the rich and those who serve their interests".

=== Main points ===
According to the party's website, the party's main points in the party platform are:

- "Humane living conditions" with regard to wages, unemployment benefits, pensions and student loans.
- Access to secure and free housing.
- A free healthcare system with no additional payments, as well as free access to education for all levels of education.
- Shorter working hours.
- A reform of the tax system with higher taxes for the wealthy and lower taxes for wage earners.

=== Housing ===
The party considers access to affordable housing to be a fundamental right, and calls for immediate actions to tackle the problems facing the Icelandic housing market. Those actions include:

- The construction of 4000 apartments every year for the next three years.
- The construction of 30 thousand public apartments in the next ten years.
- The deprivatization of the Icelandic housing market.
- The establishment of a new housing fund intended to fund construction of apartments for public housing associations.
- To guarantee that public housing associations make up at least 25% of the housing market in 20 years.
- To implement a ceiling on the maximum price for rent.
- To guarantee that people don't have to put more than a fourth of their income towards rent.
- To put severe restrictions on short-term rental companies such as Airbnb.
- To make lodging houses for homeless people available during the daytime as well.
- To guarantee all students access to free student accommodation.
- To guarantee access to free housing for the elderly and the disabled.

=== Healthcare ===
The party's healthcare policies include:

- That Iceland have free public healthcare.
- To work against the privatization of the Icelandic healthcare system.
- To strengthen the Icelandic healthcare system.
- The ratification of the Convention on the Rights of Persons with Disabilities.
- That user-directed personal assistance be used to help people with disabilities.
- That the June 2017 UN report on mental health be respected.
- Increase funding for hospitals.
- Lowering the prices for medication and to monitor the quality of medicines that are sold.
- To strengthen mental health services.
- To establish an ombudsman office for patients.
- To guarantee access to rehabilitation for the chronically ill.
- That the elderly are guaranteed access to health services according to their needs.
- To improve the work environment for healthcare workers.

=== Democracy ===
The party's policies towards democracy include:

- That equality is the cornerstone of democracy.
- To guarantee a fair voting system for all.
- That the results of elections be always respected.
- That the new constitution of Iceland proposed during the 2010–2013 Icelandic constitutional reform be taken into effect.
- That democratic concepts be part of fundamental education.
- To guarantee access to accurate and reliable information to the public.
- To implement the democratization of labour unions and pension funds.
- To guarantee funding for public associations.
- To ensure that Iceland's natural resources are owned by the public.
- To implement workplace democracy.

=== Mutual funds ===
The party's policies on mutual funds include:

- To combine the fragmented systems of benefits and pensions into one general insurance system so that everyone can be guaranteed a decent life.
- To simplify the insurance system.
- To replace student loans with scholarships.
- To increase tax investigations and surveillance over large corporations and rich individuals.
- That the tax system be used as an equalization tool.
- To increase benefits for parents.
- To abolish fees for public services.
- That the profits from natural resources be nationalized.

=== Education ===
The party's educational policies include:

- To make all levels of education in public schools free.
- To make the cafeteria food in elementary schools and upper secondary schools free of charge.
- To prevent elitism and class divide between schools.
- That the schools support the wellbeing of students and teachers and prevent competition within schools.
- That students have access to free extracurricular activities and that these activities are moved into schools, if such a thing is possible.
- That all immigrants have access to fundamental education in Icelandic and that children of immigrants have access to education in their mother tongue.
- That children who are seeking asylum have the same opportunities to education as other children.
- To activate democratic ideas within students and teachers on all levels of education.
- That teachers are respected and to make their positions are made desirable.
- That all matters of education and the labour market are decided in close cooperation with labour unions.
- To increase vocational, technology, and art studies on all levels of education.
- To implement a scholarship program.
- To ensure an active research, scientific and academic environment in Iceland.

=== Municipal Matters ===
The Party's Policies towards the Municipalities of Iceland include:

- That the basic needs of all residents are met such that all can enjoy general welfare, and that people's rights be respected. Special attention will be given to child safety.
- That the Municipalities work to assist individuals and families, and give special care to the welfare of those in difficult circumstances, like the unemployed, the elderly, immigrants, and those with low wages.
- To guarantee that children grow up in a healthy environment with their parents and friends.
- That children be guaranteed access to free education, and to provide funding for schools so that education is sufficient. Equality, health and the welfare of children will be guaranteed, as well as the strengthening of reading ability, creativity, human rights, and democracy will be respected.
- That municipalities have realistic policies towards those who need financial assistance. Individuals and families in need will be guaranteed financial assistance.
- That the needs of those who use public services be prioritised and that access to welfare services be strengthened.
- That all be guaranteed access to housing. Municipalities will be obligated to provide public housing for those who need it. Publicly run rent associations and individuals will be given priority when it comes to the ownership of land, and municipalities will assist in the construction of new apartments. Living opportunities within the municipalities will be increased, and harsh laws against private rent associations will be implemented. There will be a limit on how high renting can be.
- Residents of the municipalities will be encouraged to have a say in the runnings of their municipality, and efforts will be taken to make it easier. Every municipality will have an advisory board filled with randomly selected residents. Special care will be taken towards residents of larger municipalities.
- That municipalities abandon low-wage policies, and take up policies of high wages, low work hours, and increased benefits of workers.
- To guarantee access to a healthy environment and increase awareness of environmental matters.
- That public transfer serves residents of the municipalities, especially those in need. Reliance on cars in the capital area and larger municipalities will be decreased. New residential areas will be guaranteed access to public transport.
- To guard companies in public ownership, and that public companies in the ownership of the municipalities will not be sold, and increased funding for public companies will be guaranteed.
- That municipalities work together to guarantee the rights of all residents, and that tax collection will be fair to prevent the formation of tax havens.
- That municipalities increase transparency and access to information. Professionals will be assigned as mayors, not politicians.

== Election results ==
=== Parliamentary elections ===
Election	Leader	Votes	%	Seats	+/–	Position	Government
2021	Gunnar Smári	8,181	4.10	0 / 63	New	9th	Extra-parliamentary
2024	Sanna Magdalena Mörtudóttir	8,422	3.96	0 / 63	0	▲7th	Extra-parliamentary

=== Municipal Council elections ===
==== Reykjavík City Council ====
Election	Leader	Votes	%	Seats	+/–	Position	Government
2018	Sanna Magdalena Mörtudóttir	3,758	6.4	1 / 23	New	5th	Opposition
2022	Sanna Magdalena Mörtudóttir	4,618	7.7	2 / 23	▲1	5th	Opposition

==== Kópavogur Municipal Council ====
Election	Leader	Votes	%	Seats	+/–	Position	Government
2018	Arnþór Sigurðsson	507	3.2	0 / 11	New	9th	Extra-parliamentary

== Leaders ==
Leader	Took office	Left office	Duration	Name of title
Gunnar Smári Egilsson (born 1961)	1 May 2017	20 October 2024	7 years, 5 months, 20 days (2,730 days)	Political Leader
Sanna Magdalena Mörtudóttir (born 1992)	20 October 2024	26 May 2025	7 months, 6 days (219 days)	Political Leader
Sæþór Benjamín Randalsson (born 1981)	24 May 2025	7 June 2026	1 year, 14 days (379 days)	Chairman of the Executive Committee
Jón Ferdínand Estherarson	7 June 2026	Present	3 months and 17 days (109 days)	Chairman of the Executive Committee

== External references ==
- Official website (in English)
- Official Facebook account (in Icelandic)
