= Pirate Party (Iceland) =

Pirate Party Píratar
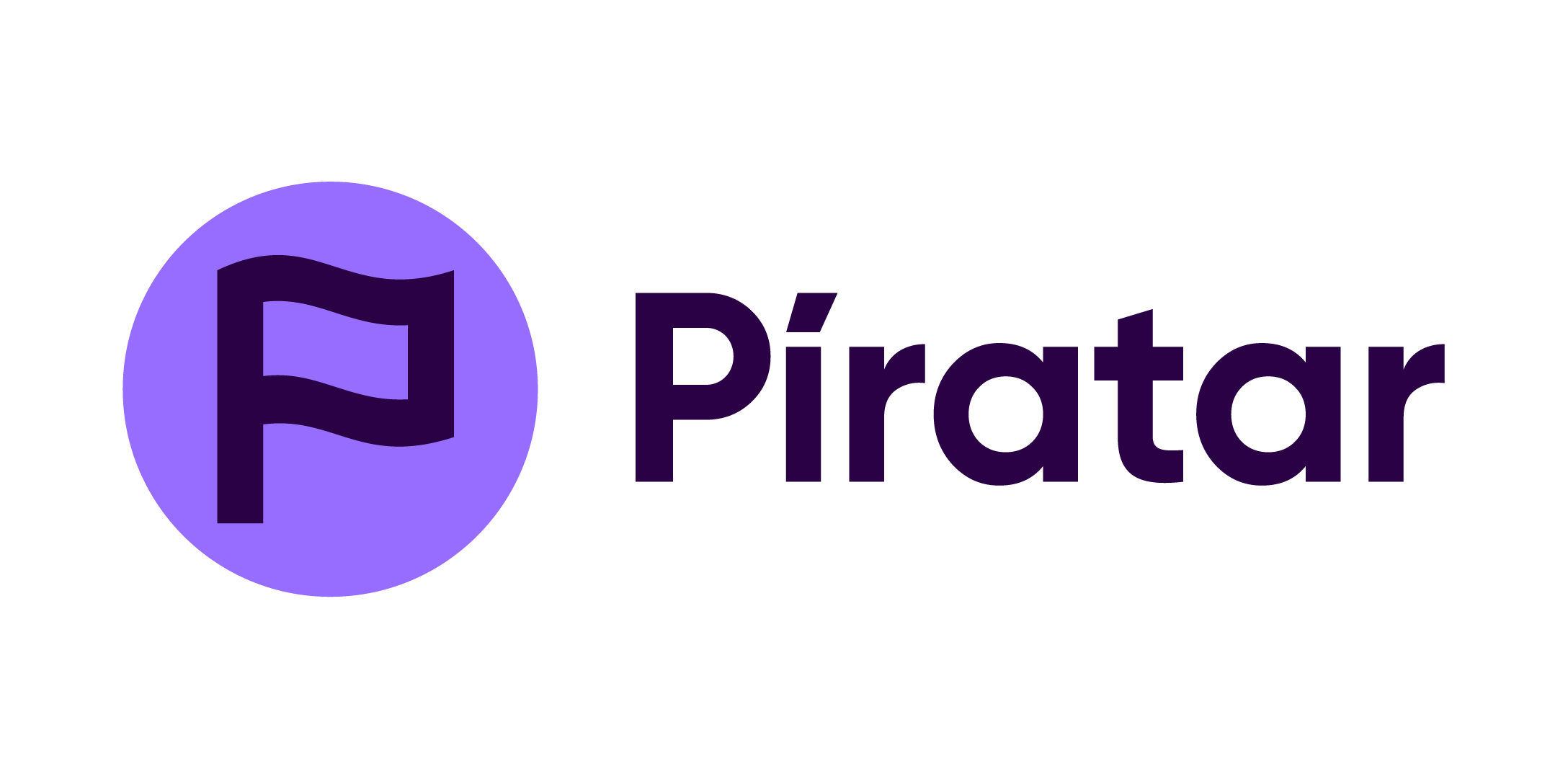
- Chairperson: Oktavía Hrund Guðrúnar Jóns
- Vice-chairperson: Ingibjörg Þóra Haraldsdóttir
- Founders: Halldóra Mogensen Birgitta Jónsdóttir; Björn Þór Jóhannesson; Eva Lind Þuríðardóttir; Helgi Hrafn Gunnarsson; Jón Þór Ólafsson; Jason Scott Katz; Smári McCarthy
- Founded: 24 November 2012
- Headquarters: Hverfisgata 39, 101 Reykjavík
- Youth wing: Ungir Píratar
- Membership (2023): 5,069
- Ideology: Pirate politics; Direct democracy; Open government
- International affiliation: Pirate Parties International (until 2015)
- Colours: Purple, Black
- Seats in Parliament: 0 / 63

Election symbol
- P

Website
- piratar.is

The Pirate Party (Icelandic: Píratar, lit. 'Pirates') is a political party in Iceland. The party's platform is based on pirate politics and direct democracy. The party was founded on 24 November 2012 and ran for the first time in the 2013 parliamentary election.

== History ==
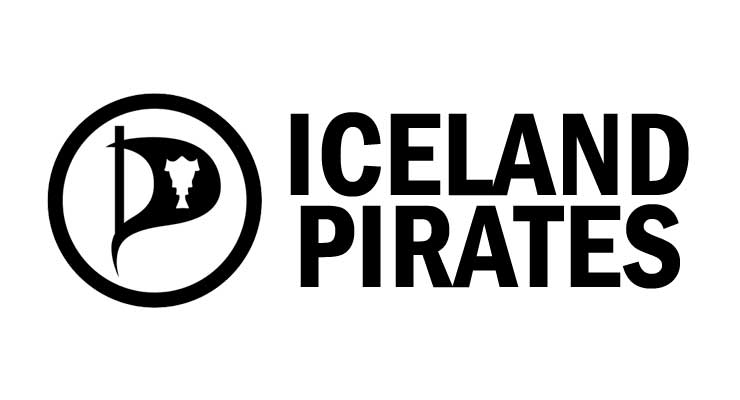
Previous logo of the Pirate Party.

Logo used from 2024 until 2026.

The Icelandic Pirate Party was founded on 24 November 2012 by Smári McCarthy and several Internet activists, including Birgitta Jónsdóttir (previously a member of the Movement). The party successfully applied for the ballot list letter Þ (resembling the party's logo) in order to run in the 2013 election. In July 2016, the party requested and was issued the letter P for future elections.

In their first electoral participation, at the 2013 parliamentary election, the Pirate Party won 5.1% of the votes, just above the 5% threshold required to win representation in the Althing. The three members elected, Birgitta Jónsdóttir, Helgi Hrafn Gunnarsson, and Jón Þór Ólafsson, were the first pirates elected to any national legislature in the world.

Following the Charlie Hebdo shooting on 7 January 2015, the Pirate Party began a campaign to repeal Iceland's blasphemy laws. The laws, which had been introduced in 1940, were successfully repealed in early July 2015. The repeal, introduced by the Pirate Party, read: "Freedom of expression is one of the cornerstones of democracy. It is fundamental to a free society that people should be able to express themselves without fear of punishment, whether from the authorities or from other people". During the vote on the repeal, the three Pirate Party members of the Althing stood and declared "Je suis Charlie", in solidarity with the French satirical magazine.

For around a year from April 2015 to April 2016, the party consistently topped polling for the next Icelandic parliamentary election in 2016, with support roughly equal to the Independence Party and the Progressive Party combined, who were at the time partners in a coalition government. An MMR opinion poll published in January 2016 put their public support at 37.8%, significantly above that of all other Icelandic political parties.

In April 2016, public protests about the Prime Minister's role in the Panama Papers brought out a significant percentage of the whole population, and may have been among "the largest demonstrations of any kind, in any country, ever (proportionately speaking)". In the wake of the Panama Papers scandal, polls in April 2016 showed the Pirate Party at 43% and the Independence Party at 21.6%. A poll by the Social Science Research Institute of the University of Iceland with data from 14–19 October 2016 put the Pirate Party in first place in the general election on 29 October 2016 with 22.6% of the vote.

Despite promising signs, party significantly underperformed in the 2016 election. While they saw a major increase in vote share and seats, they finished in third place behind the Independence Party and Left-Greens with 14.5% of the vote; almost a third of what some had polls shown at the beginning of the year.

In the 2017 election held a year later, the Pirates fell to sixth place, winning 9.2% of the vote and losing four seats, and remained around the same level of support in the 2021 election, winning six seats and remaining in sixth position. The party lost all its seats for the first time in the 2024 election. In 2026, the party lost its three remaining seats on the Reykjavík City Council.

== Issue stances ==
=== European Union ===
The party has not officially taken a position in favour of or against Iceland's accession to the European Union. The party has however concluded the following in a party policy on the European Union:

- Iceland must never become a member of the European Union unless the membership agreement is put to a referendum after having been presented to the nation in an impartial manner.
- Should Iceland join the European Union, the country shall be a single constituency in elections to the European Parliament.
- Should Iceland join the European Union, Icelandic shall be one of its official languages.
- If negotiations on the accession of Iceland to the European Union halt, or membership is rejected by either party, a review of the agreement on the European Economic Area must be sought, to better ensure Iceland's self-determination. It is unacceptable that Iceland needs to take up a large part of the European legislation through a business agreement without getting representatives or an audience.
- The conditions of Pirates for Iceland's membership to the European Union are that Iceland be exempt from adopting the Data Retention Directive (2006/24/EC – declared invalid by the European Court of Justice in April 2014) and the regulation regarding enforcement of uncontested claims (1869/2005/EC), which would otherwise defy fundamental human rights.

=== Edward Snowden ===
On 4 July 2013, a bill was introduced in parliament that would, if passed, immediately grant Edward Snowden Icelandic citizenship. The proposer of the bill was Helgi Hrafn Gunnarsson (Pirate Party) and it was co-sponsored by the other Pirate Party parliament members, Ögmundur Jónasson (Left-Green Movement), Páll Valur Björnsson (Bright Future) and Helgi Hjörvar (Social Democratic Alliance). A vote was taken to determine whether the bill would be put on parliament's agenda but it did not receive enough support.

=== Other ===
The party stated in its 2021 policy agenda that it wants to in the future transition the government support structure towards an unconditional basic income. The party also stated its support for harm reduction and the decriminalisation of drug use, instead focusing on building support systems for those with problems and housing homeless addicts.

== Election results ==
=== Parliament ===
Election	Votes	%	Seats	+/–	Position	Government
2013	9,648	5.10	3 / 63	New	6th	Opposition
2016	27,466	14.48	10 / 63	▲7	▲3rd	Opposition
2017	18,053	9.20	6 / 63	▼4	▼6th	Opposition
2021	17,233	8.63	6 / 63	0	6th	Opposition
2024	6,411	3.02	0 / 63	▼6	▼8th	Extra-parliamentary

=== Municipalities ===
==== Akureyri Town ====
Election	# of overall votes	% of overall vote	# of overall seats won	+/–	Position	Council
2018	377	4.3	0 / 11	0	7th	Outside
2022	▼280	▼3.1	0 / 11	0	▼9th	Outside

==== Árborg Municipality ====
The currently elected representative is Álfheiður Eymarsdóttir.

Election	# of overall votes	% of overall vote	# of overall seats won	+/–	Position	Council
2018^{*}	376	8.5	1 / 9	0	5th	Coalition
2022^{*}	390	▼7.9	1 / 11	0	▲4th	Opposition

^{*} Áfram Árborg, joint candidature with Viðreisn.

==== Hafnarfjörður Town ====
Election	# of overall votes	% of overall vote	# of overall seats won	+/–	Position	Council
2018	754	6.70	0 / 11	0	8th	Outside
2022	▲784	▼6.1	0 / 11	0	▲4th	Outside

==== Ísafjörður Town ====
Election	# of overall votes	% of overall vote	# of overall seats won	+/–	Position	Council
2022	90	4.6	0 / 9	0	4th	Outside

==== Kópavogur Town ====
The currently elected representative is Sigurbjörg Erla Egilsdóttir.

Election	# of overall votes	% of overall vote	# of overall seats won	+/–	Position	Council
2014	554	4.04	0 / 11	0	6th	Outside
2018	▲1,080	▲6.8	1 / 11	▲1	▲5th	Opposition
2022	▲1,562	▲9.5	1 / 11	0	5th	Opposition

==== Mosfellsbær Town ====
Election	# of overall votes	% of overall vote	# of overall seats won	+/–	Position	Council
2018^{*}	369	7.9	0 / 9	0	7th	Outside
2022	did not participate					

^{*} Joint candidature with Íbúahreyfingin.

==== Reykjanesbær ====
Election	# of overall votes	% of overall vote	# of overall seats won	+/–	Position	Council
2014	173	2.48	0 / 11	0	6th	Outside
2018	▲380	▲6.0	0 / 11	0	▼7th	Outside
2022	▼275	▼4.1	0 / 11	0	▲6th	Outside

==== Reykjavík City ====
The currently elected representatives are Dóra Björt Guðjónsdóttir, Alexandra Briem and Magnús Davíð Norðdahl.

Election	# of overall votes	% of overall vote	# of overall seats won	+/–	Position	Council
2014	3,238	5.93	1 / 15	1	6th	Coalition
2018	▲4,556	▲7.7	2 / 23	▲1	▲4th	Coalition
2022	▲6,970	▲11.6	3 / 23	▲1	4th	Coalition
