= Reykjavík City Council =

City council of Reykjavík, Iceland

Reykjavík City Council Borgarstjórn Reykjavíkur

Type
- Type: Unicameral

Leadership
- Mayor: Hildur Björnsdóttir (I) since 2 June 2026
- Deputy Mayor: Þórdís Lóa Þórhallsdóttir (C) since 19 June 2018
- Council President: Björg Magnúsdóttir (C) since 2 June 2026

Structure
- Seats: 23
- Political groups: Government (12) Independence Party (9) Viðreisn (2) Progressive Party (1) Opposition (11) Social Democratic Alliance (5) Centre Party (3) Left-Green Movement (2) Socialist Party (1)

Elections
- Last election: 16 May 2026
- Next election: 2030 Reykjavík City Council election

Meeting place
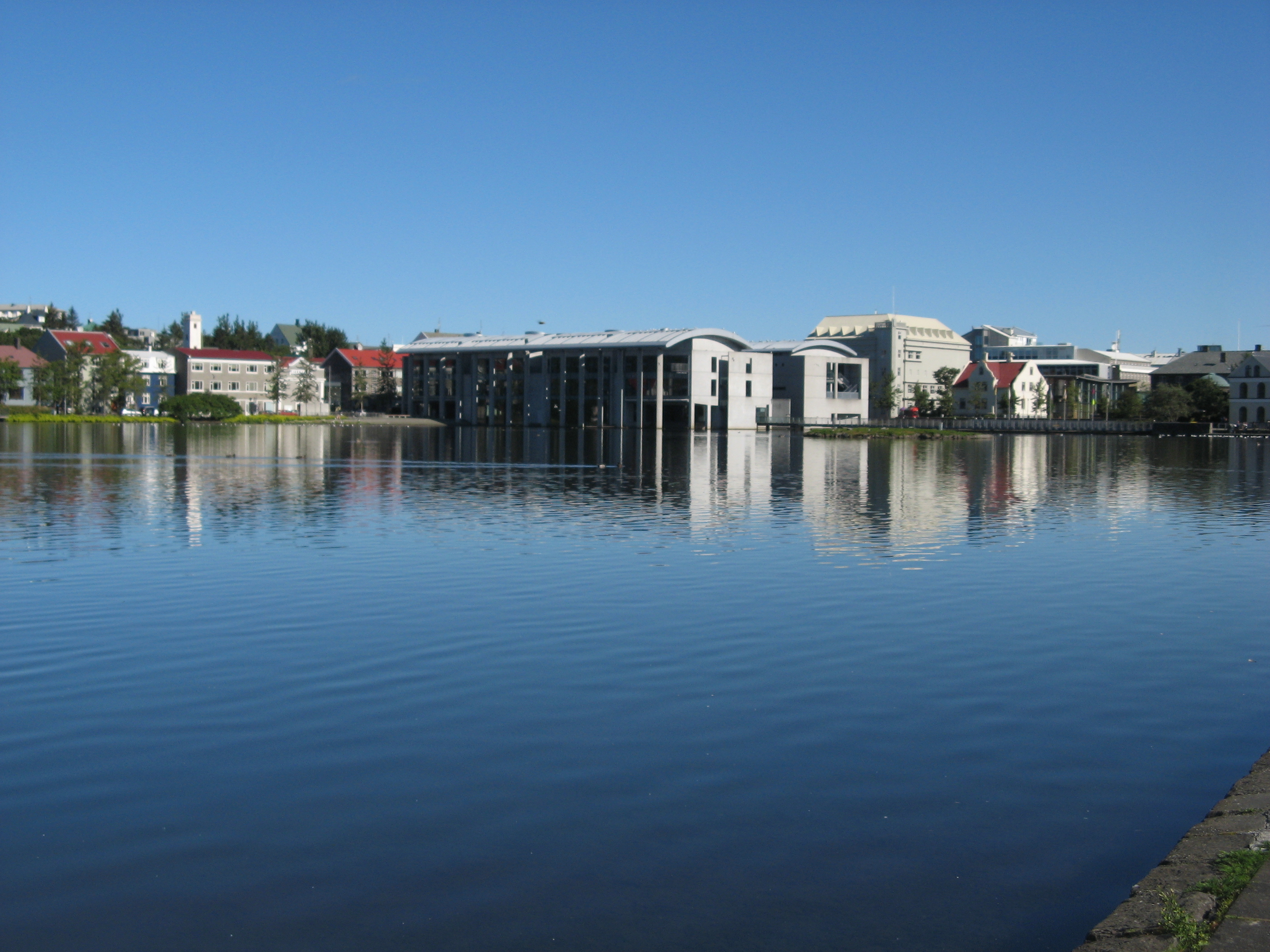
- Reykjavík City Hall; Tjarnargata 11, Reykjavík

Website
- www.reykjavik.is

The Reykjavík City Council (Icelandic: Borgarstjórn Reykjavíkur) is the local council for Reykjavík, the capital and largest city of Iceland. It is composed of 23 members elected by proportional representation for a 4-year term

The Council appoints a mayor and committees under its authority responsible for the daily operations of the city government. Meetings of the City Council take place on the first and third Tuesday of each month.

== Reykjavík City Executive Council ==
The City Executive Council (Borgarráð) is the principal executive committee of Reykjavík and works alongside the Mayor in overseeing the administration and finances of the city. It is responsible for implementing decisions of the City Council, preparing matters for council consideration, supervising municipal departments and services, and managing the city's budget and financial affairs. The council consists of seven full members and seven alternate members appointed by the City Council, with membership reflecting the political composition of the council. During the 2026–2027 term, the Mayor of Reykjavík is Hildur Björnsdóttir, while the City Executive Council is chaired by Einar Þorsteinsson. The City Executive Council serves as Reykjavík's main executive body, coordinating policy implementation and ensuring the effective administration of Iceland's capital and largest municipality.

=== Members ===
- Hildur Björnsdóttir — Mayor of Reykjavík
- Einar Þorsteinsson — Chair of the City Executive Council
- Björg Magnúsdóttir — Deputy Chair of the City Executive Council; President of City Council
- Ragnhildur Alda María Vilhjálmsdóttir — Executive Council Member
- Bjarni Guðjónsson — Executive Council Member; Chair of the Sports and Leisure Council
- Ari Edwald — Executive Council Member
- Pétur Hafliði Marteinsson — Executive Council Member

== Authority ==
According to Article 8 of Icelandic municipal laws, the Reykjavík Council is in charge of legislation regarding city affairs and the financial budget for implementation of projects. The council appoints a mayor who serves as the chief executive of the Reykjavik city council.

== Election result 2022 ==
The 2022 council elections were held on Saturday May 14. The results meant that the previous ruling coalition (S+C+P+V) lost its majority. The Progressive Party had the largest increase in votes, going from 0 to 4 council seats. Unofficial talks about forming new coalitions started on Monday May 16 and the negotiations were expected to last up to a few weeks.

Party	Symbol	Votes	%	Seats	+/−	Council
Independence Party	D	▼14,686	▼24.5	▼6	–2	Opposition
Social Democratic Alliance	S	▼12,164	▼20.3	▼5	–2	Coalition
Progressive Party	B	▲11,227	▲18.7	▲4	+4	Opposition
Pirate Party	P	▲6,970	▲11.6	▲3	+1	Coalition
Icelandic Socialist Party	J	▲4,618	▲7.7	▲2	+1	Coalition
Viðreisn	C	▼3,111	▼5.2	▼1	–1	Opposition
People's Party	F	▲2,701	▲4.5	1	0	Coalition
Left-Green Movement	V	▼2,396	▼4.0	1	0	Coalition
Centre Party	M	▼1,467	▼2.4	▼0	–1	extra-parliamentary
others		▲1,885	▲3.1	0	0	Outside

Elected Council Representatives 2022–Now
Rank	Party	Name	Role
1.	D	Hildur Björnsdóttir	Opposition
2.	S	Heiða Björg Hilmisdóttir	Mayor
3.	D	Einar Þorsteinsson	Opposition
4.	D	Ragnhildur Alda María Vilhjálmsdóttir	Opposition
5.	P	Dóra Björt Guðjónsdóttir	Coalition
6.	S	Skúli Þór Helgason	Coalition
7.	B	Árelía Eydís Guðmundsdóttir	Opposition
8.	D	Kjartan Magnússon	Opposition
9.	J	Sanna Magdalena Mörtudóttir	Coalition
10.	S	Sabine Leskopf	Coalition
11.	B	Magnea Gná Jóhannsdóttir	Opposition
12.	D	Marta Guðjónsdóttir	Opposition
13.	P	Alexandra Briem	Coalition
14.	C	Þórdís Lóa Þórhallsdóttir	Opposition
15.	S	Hjálmar Sveinsson	Coalition
16.	D	Björn Gíslason	Opposition
17.	B	Aðalsteinn Haukur Sverrisson	Opposition
18.	F	Helga Þórðardóttir	Coalition
19.	D	Friðjón R. Friðjónsson	Opposition
20.	S	Guðný Maja Riba	Coalition
21.	V	Líf Magneudóttir	Coalition
22.	P	Magnús Davíð Norðdahl	Coalition
23.	J	Andrea Helgadóttir	Coalition

== Election result 2018 ==
Party	Symbol	Votes	%	Seats	Council
Independence Party	D	▲18,146	▲30.8	▲8	Opposition
Social Democratic Alliance	S	▼15,260	▼25.9	▲7	Coalition
Viðreisn	C	4,812	8.2	2	Coalition
Pirate Party	P	▲4,556	▲7.7	▲2	Coalition
Icelandic Socialist Party	J	3,758	6.4	1	Opposition
Centre Party	M	3,615	6.1	1	Opposition
Left-Green Movement	V	▼2,700	▼4.6	1	Coalition
People's Party	F	2,509	4.3	1	Opposition
Progressive Party	B	▼1,870	▼3.2	▼0	extra-parliamentary
others		▲1,740	▲2.8	0	Outside

Elected Council Representatives 2018–2022
Rank	Party	Name	Role
1.	D	Eyþór Arnalds	Opposition
2.	S	Dagur B. Eggertsson	Mayor
3.	B	Hildur Björnsdóttir	Opposition
4.	S	Heiða Björg Hilmisdóttir	Coalition
5.	D	Valgerður Sigurðardóttir	Opposition
6.	S	Skúli Helgason	Coalition
7.	C	Þórdís Lóa Þórhallsdóttir	Coalition
8.	P	Dóra Björt Guðjónsdóttir	Coalition
9.	D	Egill Þór Jónsson	Opposition
10.	S	Kristín Soffía Jónsdóttir	Coalition
11.	J	Sanna Magdalena Mörtudóttir	Opposition
12.	D	Marta Guðjónsdóttir	Opposition
13.	M	Vigdís Hauksdóttir	Opposition
14.	S	Hjálmar Sveinsson	Coalition
15.	D	Katrín Atladóttir	Opposition
16.	V	Líf Magneudóttir	Coalition
17.	D	Örn Þórðarson	Opposition
18.	S	Sabine Leskopf	Coalition
19.	F	Kolbrún Baldursdóttir	Opposition
20.	C	Pawel Bartoszek	Coalition
21.	P	Sigurborg Ósk Haraldsdóttir	Coalition
22.	D	Björn Gíslason	Opposition
23.	S	Guðrún Ögmundsdóttir	Coalition

== Party Composition and Majorities of the City Council 1930-2018 ==
	1	2	3	4	5	6	7	8	9	10	11	12	13	14	15
1930–1934	Independence Party Majority								Social Democratic Party					Progressive Party	
1934–1938	Independence Party Majority								Social Democratic Party					Communist Party	Progressive Party
1938–1942	Independence Party Majority									Social Democratic Party and Communist Party					Progressive Party
1942–1946	Independence Party Majority								Social Democratic Party			Socialist Party			
1946–1950	Independence Party Majority								Social Democratic Party	Progressive Party		Socialist Party			
1950–1954	Independence Party Majority								Social Democratic Party		Progressive Party	Socialist Party			
1954–1958	Independence Party Majority								Social Democratic Party		Socialist Party			Progressive Party	National Preservation Party
1958–1962	Independence Party Majority										Socialist Party			Progressive Party	Social Democratic Party
1962–1966	Independence Party Majority									Social Democratic Party	People's Alliance			Progressive Party	
1966–1970	Independence Party Majority								Social Democratic Party		People's Alliance			Progressive Party	
1970–1974	Independence Party Majority								Social Democratic Party	People's Alliance			Progressive Party		
1974–1978	Independence Party Majority									Social Democratic Party	People's Alliance			Progressive Party	
1978–1982	Independence Party							Social Democratic Party Majority		People's Alliance Majority					Progressive Party Majority

The City Council's seat number was increased from 15 to 21 for the period 1982-1986 and then immediately reverted afterwards.

	1	2	3	4	5	6	7	8	9	10	11	12	13	14	15	16	17	18	19	20	21
1982–1986	Independence Party Majority												People's Alliance				Social Democratic Party	Progressive Party		Women's List	

	1	2	3	4	5	6	7	8	9	10	11	12	13	14	15
1986–1990	Independence Party Majority									People's Alliance			Social Democratic Party	Progressive Party	Women's List
1990–1994	Independence Party Majority										People's Alliance	Social Democratic Party		Progressive Party	Women's List
1994–1998	Independence Party							Reykjavík's List Majority							
1998–2002	Independence Party							Reykjavík's List Majority							
2002–2006	Independence Party						Liberal Party	Reykjavík's List Majority							
2006–2010	Independence Party Majority 11. June 2006 – 16. October 2007; Majority 24. January 2008 – 21. August 2008; Majority 21. August 2008 – 29. maí 2010							Liberal Party Majority 16. October 2007 – 24. January 2008; Majority 24. January 2008 – 21. August 2008	Progressive Party Majority 11. June 2006 – 16. October 2007; Majority 16. October 2007 – 24. January 2008; Majority 21. August 2008 – 29. maí 2010	Social Democratic Alliance Majority 16. October 2007 – 24. January 2008				Left-Green Movement Majority 16. October 2007 – 24. January 2008	
2010–2014	Independence Party					Best Party Majority						Social Democratic Alliance Majority			Left-Green Movement
2014–2018	Independence Party				Progressive Party		Bright Future Majority		Social Democratic Alliance Majority					Pirate Party Majority	Left-Green Movement Majority

== Party Composition and Majorities of the City Council 2018 Onwards ==
	1	2	3	4	5	6	7	8	9	10	11	12	13	14	15	16	17	18	19	20	21	22	23
2018–2022	Independence Party								Centre Party	Liberal Reform Majority		Social Democratic Alliance Majority							Pirate Party Majority		Left-Green Movement Majority	People's Party	Icelandic Socialist Party
2022-2026	Independence Party						Progressive Party Majority 6. June 2022: 22. February 2025				Liberal Reform Majority 6. June 2022: 22. February 2025	Social Democratic Alliance Majority 6. June 2022: 22. February 2025; Majority 22. February 2025; 2. June 2026					Pirate Party Majority 6. June 2022: 22. February 2025; Majority 22. February 2025; 2. June 2026			Left-Green Movement Majority 22. February 2025: 2. June 2026	People's Party Majority 22. February 2025: 2. June 2026	Icelandic Socialist Party Majority 22. February 2025: 2. June 2026	
2026–2030	Independence Party Majority									Centre Party			Progressive Party Majority	Liberal Reform Majority		Social Democratic Alliance					Left-Green Movement		Icelandic Socialist Party
