= List of members of the Althing, 2016–2017 =

This is a list of the 63 members of the Althing (Icelandic Parliament), from 2016 until 2017.

== Election results ==
National party	Chairperson(s)	Seats	± 2013
Independence Party	Bjarni Benediktsson	21 / 63	▲2
Left-Green Movement	Katrín Jakobsdóttir	10 / 63	▲3
Pirate Party	Collective leadership	10 / 63	▲7
Progressive Party	Sigmundur Gunnlaugsson	8 / 63	▼11
Viðreisn	Benedikt Jóhannesson	7 / 63	new
Bright Future (Iceland)	Óttarr Proppé	4 / 63	▼2
Social Democratic Alliance	Oddný G. Harðardóttir	3 / 63	▼6

== List of chosen MPs ==
Members of the Althing elected on 29 October 2016
Reykjavik North	Reykjavik South	Southwest	Northwest	Northeast	South
1. Gudlaugur Thor Thordarson (D); 2. Katrín Jakobsdóttir (V); 3. Birgitta Jónsdóttir (P); 4. Arna Sigurbjörnsdóttir (D); 5. Þorsteinn Víglundsson (C); 6. Steinunn Þóra Árnadóttir (V); 7. Björn Leví Gunnarsson (P); 8. Birgir Ármannsson (D); 9. Björt Ólafsdóttir (A); L7. Andrés Ingi Jónsson (V); L9. Halldóra Mogensen (P)	1. Ólöf Nordal (D); 2. Svandís Svavarsdóttir (V); 3. Ásta Guðrún Helgadóttir (P); 4. Brynjar Níelsson (D); 5. Hanna Katrín Friðriksson (C); 6. Kolbeinn Óttarsson Proppé (V); 7. Gunnar Hrafn Jónsson (P); 8. Sigríður Á. Andersen (D); 9. Lilja Alfreðsdóttir (B); L2. Nichole Leigh Mosty (A); L8. Pawel Bartoszek (C)	1. Bjarni Benediktsson (D); 2. Bryndís Haraldsdóttir (D); 3. Jón Þór Ólafsson (P); 4. Þorgerður K. Gunnarsdóttir (C); 5. Rósa Björk Brynjólfsdóttir (V); 6. Jón Gunnarsson (D); 7. Óttarr Proppé (A); 8. Óli Björn Kárason (D); 9. Eygló Harðardóttir (B); 10.Þórhildur Sunna Ævarsdóttir (P); 11.Vilhjálmur Bjarnason (D); L5. Theodóra S. Þorsteinsdóttir (A); L6. Jón Steindór Valdimarsson (C)	1. Haraldur Benediktsson (D); 2. Gunnar Bragi Sveinsson (B); 3. Lilja Rafney Magnúsdóttir (V); 4. Þórdís Kolbrún Gylfadóttir (D); 5. Eva Pandora Baldursdóttir (P); 6. Elsa Lara Arnardóttir (B); 7. Teitur Björn Einarsson (D); L4. Guðjón S. Brjánsson (S)	1. Kristján Þór Júlíusson (D); 2. Sigmundur David Gunnlaugsson (B); 3. Steingrímur J. Sigfússon (V); 4. Njáll Trausti Friðbertsson (D); 5. Þórunn Egilsdóttir (B); 6. Bjarkey Gunnarsdóttir (V); 7. Einar Brynjolfsson (P); 8. Valgerður Gunnarsdóttir (D); 9. Logi Már Einarsson (S); L3. Benedikt Jóhannesson (C)	1. Páll Magnússon (D); 2. Sigurður Ingi Jóhannsson (B); 3. Ásmundur Friðriksson (D); 4. Smári McCarthy (P); 5. Vilhjálmur Árnason (D); 6. Ari Trausti Guðmundsson (V); 7. Silja Dögg Gunnarsdóttir (B); 8. Unnur Brá Konráðsdóttir (D); 9. Jóna Sólveig Elínardóttir (C); L1. Oddný G. Harðardóttir (S)
Key: D = Independence Party; B = Progressive Party; S = Social Democratic Alliance; V = Left-Green Movement; A = Bright Future; P = Pirate Party; C = Viðreisn; L1-L9 = Leveling seats nr.1-9. Source: Althingi

For the parties having qualified with a national result above the 5% election threshold, the 9 leveling seats (L1-L9) were first distributed party-wise according to the calculation method in this particular order (where the party's total number of national votes was divided by the sum of "won seats plus 1" - with an extra leveling seat granted to the party with the highest fraction - while repeating this process until all 9 leveling seats had been determined). At the next step, these leveling seats were then by the same order distributed one by one to the relative strongest constituency of the seat winning party (while disregarding the constituencies that already ran out of vacant leveling seats). At the third step, the specific leveling seat is finally granted to the party's highest ranked runner-up candidate within the constituency, according to the same accumulated candidate vote score as being used when apportioning the constituency seats.

Candidates selected for the 9 leveling seats (L1-L9 are first apportioned at national level to parties, then to the relative strongest constituency of the party, and finally given to its highest ranked runner-up candidate)	Leveling seats won by party	Reykjavik North	Reykjavik South	Southwest	Northwest	Northeast	South
Candidates selected for the 9 leveling seats (L1-L9 are first apportioned at national level to parties, then to the relative strongest constituency of the party, and finally given to its highest ranked runner-up candidate)	Leveling seats won by party	(party vote share divided by won local seats +1)					
Independence Party (D)		6.10%	6.40%	5.64%	7.38%	6.65%	6.30%
Left-Green Movement (V)	L7	6.97% (L7)	5.88%	5.98%	9.04%	6.66%	5.09%
Pirate Party (P)	L9	6.34% (L9)	5.76%	4.52%	5.44%	4.99%	6.40%
Progressive Party (B)		5.68%	3.68%	3.81%	6.93%	6.67%	6.36%
Viðreisn (C)	L3, L6, L8	5.81%	6.37% (L8)	6.43% (L6)	6.23%	6.52% (L3)	3.67%
Bright Future (A)	L2, L5	3.82%	7.22% (L2)	5.12% (L5)	3.52%	3.41%	5.79%
Social Democratic Alliance (S)	L4, L1	5.21%	5.57%	4.75%	6.23% (L4)	4.00%	6.38% (L1)
