= List of members of the Althing, 2017–2021 =

This is a list of the 63 members of the Althing (Icelandic Parliament), from 2017 until 2021.

== Election results ==
| National party | Chairperson(s) | Seats | ± 2016 |
|---|---|---|---|
| Independence Party | Bjarni Benediktsson | 16 / 63 | ▼5 |
| Left-Green Movement | Katrín Jakobsdóttir | 11 / 63 | ▲1 |
| Progressive Party | Sigurður Ingi Jóhannsson | 8 / 63 | Steady |
| Social Democratic Alliance | Logi Már Einarsson | 7 / 63 | ▲4 |
| Centre Party | Sigmundur Davíð Gunnlaugsson | 7 / 63 | New |
| Pirate Party | Collective leadership | 6 / 63 | ▼4 |
| People's Party | Inga Sæland | 4 / 63 | ▲4 |
| Viðreisn | Þorgerður Katrín Gunnarsdóttir | 4 / 63 | ▼3 |

== List of chosen MPs ==
Members of the Althing elected on 28 October 2017
| Reykjavik North | Reykjavik South | Southwest | Northwest | Northeast | South |
|---|---|---|---|---|---|
| 1. Gudlaugur Thor Thordarson (D); 2. Katrín Jakobsdóttir (V); 3. Helgi Hrafn Gunnarsson (P); 4. Helga Vala Helgadóttir (S); 5. Áslaug Arna Sigurbjörnsdóttir (D); 6. Steinunn Þóra Árnadóttir (V); 7. Þorsteinn Víglundsson (C); 8. Birgir Ármannsson (D); 9. Andrés Ingi Jónsson (V); L2. Ólafur Ísleifsson (Independent); L3. Halldóra Mogensen (P) | 1. Sigríður Á. Andersen (D); 2. Svandís Svavarsdóttir (V); 3. Ágúst Ólafur Ágústsson (S); 4. Þórhildur Sunna Ævarsdóttir (P); 5. Brynjar Níelsson (D); 6. Kolbeinn Óttarsson Proppé (V); 7. Hanna Katrín Friðriksson (C); 8. Inga Sæland (F); 9. Lilja Alfreðsdóttir (B); L4. Þorsteinn Sæmundsson (M); L9. Björn Leví Gunnarsson (P) | 1. Bjarni Benediktsson (D); 2. Bryndís Haraldsdóttir (D); 3. Rósa Björk Brynjólfsdóttir (V); 4. Guðmundur Andri Thorsson (S); 5. Jón Gunnarsson (D); 6. Gunnar Bragi Sveinsson (M); 7. Þorgerður Katrín Gunnarsdóttir (C); 8. Jón Þór Ólafsson (P); 9. Willum Þór Þórsson (B); 10. Óli Björn Kárason (D); 11. Ólafur Þór Gunnarsson (V); L6. Guðmundur Ingi Kristinsson (F); L7. Jón Steindór Valdimarsson (C) | 1. Haraldur Benediktsson (D); 2. Ásmundur Einar Daðason (B); 3. Lilja Rafney Magnúsdóttir (V); 4. Bergþór Ólason (M); 5. Þórdís Kolbrún Gylfadóttir (D); 6. Guðjón S. Brjánsson (S); 7. Halla Signý Kristjánsdóttir (B); L8. Sigurður Páll Jónsson (M) | 1. Kristján Þór Júlíusson (D); 2. Steingrímur J. Sigfússon (V); 3. Sigmundur David Gunnlaugsson (M); 4. Þórunn Egilsdóttir (B); 5. Logi Már Einarsson (S); 6. Njáll Trausti Friðbertsson (D); 7. Bjarkey Gunnarsdóttir (V); 8. Anna Kolbrún Árnadóttir (M); 9. Líneik Anna Sævarsdóttir (B); L5. Albertína Friðbjörg Elíasdóttir (S) | 1. Páll Magnússon (D); 2. Sigurður Ingi Jóhannsson (B); 3. Birgir Þórarinsson (M); 4. Ásmundur Friðriksson (D); 5. Ari Trausti Guðmundsson (V); 6. Oddný G. Harðardóttir (S); 7. Silja Dögg Gunnarsdóttir (B); 8. Karl Gauti Hjaltason (Independent); 9. Vilhjálmur Árnason (D); L1. Smári McCarthy (P) |
Key: D = Independence Party; B = Progressive Party; S = Social Democratic Alliance; V = Left-Green Movement; P = Pirate Party; C = Viðreisn; M = Centre Party; F = People's Party; L1-L9 = Leveling seats nr.1-9. Source: Althingi (The single letters in brackets are each party's official "ballot letters".)

For the parties having qualified with a national result above the 5% election threshold, the 9 leveling seats (L1-L9) were first distributed party-wise according to the calculation method in this particular order (where the party's total number of national votes was divided by the sum of "won seats plus 1" - with an extra leveling seat granted to the party with the highest fraction - while repeating this process until all 9 leveling seats had been determined). At the next step, these leveling seats were then by the same order distributed one by one to the relative strongest constituency of the seat winning party (while disregarding the constituencies that already ran out of vacant leveling seats). At the third step, the specific leveling seat is finally granted to the party's highest ranked runner-up candidate within the constituency, according to the same accumulated candidate vote score as being used when apportioning the constituency seats.

| Candidates selected for the 9 leveling seats† | Leveling seats won by party | Reykjavik North | Reykjavik South | Southwest | Northwest | Northeast | South |
| Candidates selected for the 9 leveling seats† | Leveling seats won by party | (Party vote share divided by local seats won +1) | | | | | |
|---|---|---|---|---|---|---|---|
| Independence Party (D) | | 5.65% | 7.60% | 6.18% | 8.17% | 6.77% | 6.30% |
| Left-Green Movement (V) | | 5.38% | 6.30% | 4.53% | 8.9% | 6.63% | 5.90% |
| Progressive Party (B) | | 5.30% | 4.05% | 3.95% | 6.13% | 4.73% | 6.20% |
| Social Democratic Alliance (S) | L5 | 6.40% | 6.50% | 6.05% | 4.85% | 6.95% (L5) | 4.80% |
| Centre Party (M) | L4, L8 | 7.00% | 7.60% (L4) | 4.75% | 7.10% (L8) | 6.20% | 7.15% |
| Pirate Party (P) | L1, L3, L9 | 6.80% (L3) | 5.70% (L9) | 4.15% | 6.80% | 5.50% | 7.10% (L1) |
| People's Party (F) | L2, L6 | 7.10% (L2) | 4.10% | 6.50% (L6) | 5.30% | 4.30% | 4.45% |
| Viðreisn (C) | L7 | 4.20% | 4.25% | 4.75% (L7) | 2.50% | 2.10% | 3.10% |

† L1-L9 are first apportioned at national level to parties, then to the relative strongest constituency of the party, and finally given to its highest ranked runner-up candidate.
