= Southwest (Althing constituency) =

Constituency of the Althing, the national legislature of Iceland

- Suðvestur
- Constituency for the Althing
- Location of Southwest within Iceland
- Municipality: List: Garðabær; Hafnarfjörður; Kjósarhreppur; Kópavogur; Mosfellsbær; Seltjarnarnes
- Region: Capital
- Population: 107,283 (2024)
- Electorate: 79,087 (2024)
- Area: 802 km^{2} (2018)

Current Constituency
- Created: 2003
- Seats: List (Note: Excludes compensatory seats.): 12 (2024–present); 11 (2013–2024); 10 (2007–2013); 9 (2003–2007)
- Member of the Althing: List: Alma Möller (S); Bergþór Ólason (M); Bjarni Benediktsson (D); Bryndís Haraldsdóttir (D); Eiríkur Björn Björgvinsson (C); Guðmundur Ari Sigurjónsson (S); Guðmundur Ingi Kristinsson (F); Jónína Björk Óskarsdóttir (F); Nanna Margrét Gunnlaugsdóttir (M); Rósa Guðbjartsdóttir (D); Sigmar Guðmundsson (C); Þórdís Kolbrún R. Gylfadóttir (D); Þorgerður Katrín Gunnarsdóttir (C); Þórunn Sveinbjarnardóttir (S)
- Created from: Reykjanes

Southwest (Icelandic: Suðvestur) is one of the six multi-member constituencies of the Althing, the national legislature of Iceland. The constituency was established in 2003 following the re-organisation of constituencies across Iceland when the Reykjanes constituency was split between the new South and Southwest constituencies. Southwest is conterminous with the Capital region but excludes Reykjavík Municipality which has its own constituencies, Reykjavík North and Reykjavík South. The constituency currently elects 12 of the 63 members of the Althing using the open party-list proportional representation electoral system. At the 2024 parliamentary election it had 79,087 registered electors.

== History ==
In September 1997 Prime Minister Davíð Oddsson appointed a committee headed by Friðrik Klemenz Sophusson to review the division of constituencies in Iceland and the organisation of elections. The committee's report was published in October 1998 and recommended, amongst other things, that the number of constituencies be reduced and that they be more equal in population size. The Althing passed an amendment to the constitution in June 1999 which removed the reference to specific eight constituencies contained within Article 31 and instead simply stated that there would be six or seven constituencies and that the Althing would determine the boundaries between the constituencies. The amendment also required that if, following an election to Althing, the number of registered electors per seat (including compensatory seats) in any constituency is less than half of that in another constituency, the National Electoral Commission shall change the allocation of seats so as to reduce the imbalance.

Southwest was one of six constituencies (kjördæmi) established by the "Elections to the Althing Act no. 24/2000" (Lög um kosningar til Alþingis, nr. 24/2000) passed by the Althing in May 2000. The Act initially allocated 11 seats to the constituency - nine constituency seats and two compensatory seats. The number of seats allocated to Southwest was increased to 12 (ten constituency and two compensatory) in May 2003, 13 (11 constituency and two compensatory) in May 2013 and 14 (12 constituency and two compensatory) in October 2021.

== Electoral system ==
Southwest currently elects 12 of the 63 members of the Althing using the open party-list proportional representation electoral system. Constituency seats are allocated using the D'Hondt method. Compensatory seats (equalisation seas) are calculated based on the national vote and are allocated using the D'Hondt method at the constituency level. Only parties that reach the 5% national threshold compete for compensatory seats.

== Election results ==
=== Summary ===
Election	Left-Green V / U			Social Democrats S			People's F			Pirate P / Þ			Viðreisn C			Progressive B			Independence D			Centre M		
Election	Votes	%	Seats	Votes	%	Seats	Votes	%	Seats	Votes	%	Seats	Votes	%	Seats	Votes	%	Seats	Votes	%	Seats	Votes	%	Seats
2024	987	1.54%	0	12,324	19.27%	3	7,014	10.97%	1	1,778	2.78%	0	12,829	20.06%	3	3,792	5.93%	0	14,997	23.45%	3	7,689	12.02%	2
2021	7,087	12.09%	1	4,748	8.10%	1	4,436	7.57%	1	4,853	8.28%	1	6,684	11.40%	1	8,520	14.54%	2	17,727	30.25%	4	2,612	4.46%	0
2017	7,591	13.62%	2	6,771	12.15%	1	3,616	6.49%	0	4,641	8.33%	1	5,277	9.47%	1	4,425	7.94%	1	17,216	30.89%	4	5,282	9.48%	1
2016	6,378	11.97%	1	2,532	4.75%	0	1,742	3.27%	0	7,227	13.56%	2	6,857	12.86%	1	44,062	7.62%	1	18,049	33.86%	5			
2013	3,995	7.86%	1	6,932	13.64%	2				2,541	5.00%	0				10,944	21.53%	3	15,608	30.71%	4			
2009	8,473	17.40%	2	15,669	32.17%	3										5,627	11.55%	1	13,463	27.64%	3			
2007	5,232	11.55%	1	12,845	28.37%	3										3,250	7.18%	1	19,307	42.64%	5			
2003	2,671	6.24%	0	14,029	32.75%	4										6,387	14.91%	1	16,456	38.42%	4			

(Excludes compensatory seats.)

=== Detailed ===
==== 2020s ====
===== 2024 =====
Results of the 2024 parliamentary election held on 30 November 2024:

Party		Votes	%	Seats		
Party		Votes	%	Con.	Com.	Tot.
Independence Party	D	14,997	23.45%	3	1	4
Viðreisn	C	12,829	20.06%	3	0	3
Social Democratic Alliance	S	12,324	19.27%	3	0	3
Centre Party	M	7,689	12.02%	2	0	2
People's Party	F	7,014	10.97%	1	1	2
Progressive Party	B	3,792	5.93%	0	0	0
Socialist Party of Iceland	J	1,820	2.85%	0	0	0
Pirate Party	P	1,778	2.78%	0	0	0
Left-Green Movement	V	987	1.54%	0	0	0
Democratic Party	L	728	1.14%	0	0	0
Valid votes		63,958	100.00%	12	2	14
Blank votes		570	0.88%			
Rejected votes – other		31	0.05%			
Total polled		64,559	81.63%			
Registered electors		79,087				

The following candidates were elected:

- Constituency seats - Alma Möller (S), 12,217.17 votes; Bergþór Ólason (M), 7,580.00 votes; Bjarni Benediktsson (D), 14,451.88 votes; Bryndís Haraldsdóttir (D), 11,324.75 votes; Eiríkur Björn Björgvinsson (C), 8,579.67 votes; Guðmundur Ari Sigurjónsson (S), 10,272.83 votes; Guðmundur Ingi Kristinsson (F), 7,008.00 votes; Nanna Margrét Gunnlaugsdóttir (M), 5,786.50 votes; Sigmar Guðmundsson (C), 10,640.50 votes; Þórdís Kolbrún R. Gylfadóttir (D), 12,660.50 votes; Þorgerður Katrín Gunnarsdóttir (C), 12,698.83 votes; and Þórunn Sveinbjarnardóttir (S), 8,166.00 votes.
- Compensatory seats - Jónína Björk Óskarsdóttir (F), 5,262.00 votes; and Rósa Guðbjartsdóttir (D), 9,373.62 votes.

===== 2021 =====
Results of the 2021 parliamentary election held on 25 September 2021:

Party		Votes	%	Seats		
Party		Votes	%	Con.	Com.	Tot.
Independence Party	D	17,727	30.25%	4	0	4
Progressive Party	B	8,520	14.54%	2	0	2
Left-Green Movement	V	7,087	12.09%	1	0	1
Viðreisn	C	6,684	11.40%	1	1	2
Pirate Party	P	4,853	8.28%	1	1	2
Social Democratic Alliance	S	4,748	8.10%	1	0	1
People's Party	F	4,436	7.57%	1	0	1
Centre Party	M	2,612	4.46%	0	0	0
Socialist Party of Iceland	J	1,738	2.97%	0	0	0
Liberal Democratic Party	O	203	0.35%	0	0	0
Valid votes		58,608	100.00%	11	2	13
Blank votes		1,095	1.83%			
Rejected votes – other		117	0.20%			
Total polled		59,820	81.17%			
Registered electors		73,699				

The following candidates were elected:

- Constituency seats - Ágúst Bjarni Garðarsson (B), 6,377.75 votes; Bjarni Benediktsson (D), 17,548.75 votes; Bryndís Haraldsdóttir (D), 13,301.38 votes; Guðmundur Ingi Guðbrandsson (V), 7,035.33 votes; Guðmundur Ingi Kristinsson (F), 4,431.00 votes; Jón Gunnarsson (D), 15,421.50 votes; Óli Björn Kárason (D), 11,089.00 votes; Willum Þór Þórsson (B), 8,508.50 votes; Þorgerður Katrín Gunnarsdóttir (C), 6,582.25 votes; Þórhildur Sunna Ævarsdóttir (P), 4,833.00 votes; and Þórunn Sveinbjarnardóttir (S), 4,683.33 votes.
- Compensatory seats - Gísli Rafn Ólafsson (P), 3,639.50 votes; and Sigmar Guðmundsson (C), 5,032.00 votes.

==== 2010s ====
===== 2017 =====
Results of the 2017 parliamentary election held on 28 October 2017:

Party		Votes	%	Seats		
Party		Votes	%	Con.	Com.	Tot.
Independence Party	D	17,216	30.89%	4	0	4
Left-Green Movement	V	7,591	13.62%	2	0	2
Social Democratic Alliance	S	6,771	12.15%	1	0	1
Centre Party	M	5,282	9.48%	1	0	1
Viðreisn	C	5,277	9.47%	1	1	2
Pirate Party	P	4,641	8.33%	1	0	1
Progressive Party	B	4,425	7.94%	1	0	1
People's Party	F	3,616	6.49%	0	1	1
Bright Future	A	846	1.52%	0	0	0
People's Front of Iceland	R	75	0.13%	0	0	0
Valid votes		55,740	100.00%	11	2	13
Blank votes		1,261	2.20%			
Rejected votes – other		254	0.44%			
Total polled		57,255	82.33%			
Registered electors		69,544				

The following candidates were elected:

- Constituency seats - Bjarni Benediktsson (D), 16,738.00 votes; Bryndís Haraldsdóttir (D), 15,056.75 votes; Gunnar Bragi Sveinsson (M), 5,184.00 votes; Guðmundur Andri Thorsson (S). 6,759.67 votes; Jón Gunnarsson (D), 12,851.50 votes; Jón Þór Ólafsson (P), 4,624.00 votes; Ólafur Þór Gunnarsson (V), 5,672.75 votes; Óli Björn Kárason (D), 10,784.12 votes; Rósa Björk Brynjólfsdóttir (V), 7,580.75 votes; Willum Þór Þórsson (B), 4,405.67 votes; and Þorgerður Katrín Gunnarsdóttir (C), 5,116.25 votes.
- Compensatory seats - Guðmundur Ingi Kristinsson (F), 3,611.33 votes; and Jón Steindór Valdimarsson (C), 3,972.25 votes.

===== 2016 =====
Results of the 2016 parliamentary election held on 29 October 2016:

Party		Votes	%	Seats		
Party		Votes	%	Con.	Com.	Tot.
Independence Party	D	18,049	33.86%	5	0	5
Pirate Party	P	7,227	13.56%	2	0	2
Viðreisn	C	6,857	12.86%	1	1	2
Left-Green Movement	V	6,378	11.97%	1	0	1
Bright Future	A	5,458	10.24%	1	1	2
Progressive Party	B	4,062	7.62%	1	0	1
Social Democratic Alliance	S	2,532	4.75%	0	0	0
People's Party	F	1,742	3.27%	0	0	0
Dawn	T	893	1.68%	0	0	0
People's Front of Iceland	R	103	0.19%	0	0	0
Valid votes		53,301	100.00%	11	2	13
Blank votes		1,197	2.19%			
Rejected votes – other		169	0.31%			
Total polled		54,667	80.11%			
Registered electors		68,240				

The following candidates were elected:

- Constituency seats - Bjarni Benediktsson (D), 17,778.60 votes; Bryndís Haraldsdóttir (D), 16,152.90 votes; Eygló Harðardóttir (B), 3,894.67 votes; Jón Gunnarsson (D), 14,342.70 votes; Jón Þór Ólafsson (P), 7,211.00 votes; Óli Björn Kárason (D), 12,603.90 votes; Óttarr Proppé (A), 5,449.00 votes; Rósa Björk Brynjólfsdóttir (V), 6,373.67 votes; Vilhjálmur Bjarnason (D), 10,771.90 votes; Þorgerður Katrín Gunnarsdóttir (C), 6,300.50 votes; and Þórhildur Sunna Ævarsdóttir (P), 5,412.00 votes.
- Compensatory seats - Jón Steindór Valdimarsson (C), 5,268.25 votes; and Theodóra S. Þorsteinsdóttir (A), 4,090.00 votes.

===== 2013 =====
Results of the 2013 parliamentary election held on 27 April 2013:

Party		Votes	%	Seats		
Party		Votes	%	Con.	Com.	Tot.
Independence Party	D	15,608	30.71%	4	1	5
Progressive Party	B	10,944	21.53%	3	0	3
Social Democratic Alliance	S	6,932	13.64%	2	0	2
Bright Future	A	4,687	9.22%	1	0	1
Left-Green Movement	V	3,995	7.86%	1	0	1
Pirate Party	Þ	2,541	5.00%	0	1	1
Dawn	T	1,927	3.79%	0	0	0
Households Party	I	1,838	3.62%	0	0	0
Iceland Democratic Party	L	1,241	2.44%	0	0	0
Right-Green People's Party	G	925	1.82%	0	0	0
Rainbow	J	188	0.37%	0	0	0
Valid votes		50,826	100.00%	11	2	13
Blank votes		1,091	2.10%			
Rejected votes – other		131	0.25%			
Total polled		52,048	82.45%			
Registered electors		63,125				

The following candidates were elected:

- Constituency seats - Árni Páll Árnason (S), 6,843.8 votes; Bjarni Benediktsson (D), 14,868.7 votes; Eygló Harðardóttir (B), 10,879.2 votes; Guðmundur Steingrímsson (A), 4,664.7 votes; Jón Gunnarsson (D), 12,470.0 votes; Katrín Júlíusdóttir (S), 5,201.5 votes; Ögmundur Jónasson (V), 3,901.3 votes; Ragnheiður Ríkharðsdóttir (D), 13,969.2 votes; Vilhjálmur Bjarnason (D), 10,751.8 votes; Willum Þór Þórsson (B), 9,098.5 votes; and Þorsteinn B. Sæmundsson (B), 7,307.7 votes.
- Compensatory seats - Birgitta Jónsdóttir (Þ), 2,527.7 votes; and Elín Hirst (D), 9,142.7 votes.

==== 2000s ====
===== 2009 =====
Results of the 2009 parliamentary election held on 25 April 2009:

Party		Votes	%	Seats		
Party		Votes	%	Con.	Com.	Tot.
Social Democratic Alliance	S	15,669	32.17%	3	1	4
Independence Party	D	13,463	27.64%	3	1	4
Left-Green Movement	V	8,473	17.40%	2	0	2
Progressive Party	B	5,627	11.55%	1	0	1
Citizens' Movement	O	4,428	9.09%	1	0	1
Liberal Party	F	741	1.52%	0	0	0
Democracy Movement	P	302	0.62%	0	0	0
Valid votes		48,703	100.00%	10	2	12
Blank votes		1,519	3.02%			
Rejected votes – other		93	0.18%			
Total polled		50,315	86.45%			
Registered electors		58,202				

The following candidates were elected:

- Constituency seats - Árni Páll Árnason (S), 15,243.9 votes; Bjarni Benediktsson (D), 13,075.1 votes; Guðfríður Lilja Grétarsdóttir (V), 8,304.7 votes; Katrín Júlíusdóttir (S), 13,561.4 votes; Ögmundur Jónasson (V), 6,285.5 votes; Ragnheiður Ríkharðsdóttir (D), 9,965.1 votes; Siv Friðleifsdóttir (B), 5,259.0 votes; Þór Saari (O), 4,410.0 votes; Þorgerður Katrín Gunnarsdóttir (D), 10,900.6 votes; and Þórunn Sveinbjarnardóttir (S), 10,859.1 votes.
- Compensatory seats - Jón Gunnarsson (D), 8,460.6 votes; and Magnús Orri Schram (S), 9,930.9 votes.

===== 2007 =====
Results of the 2007 parliamentary election held on 12 May 2007:

Party		Votes	%	Seats		
Party		Votes	%	Con.	Com.	Tot.
Independence Party	D	19,307	42.64%	5	1	6
Social Democratic Alliance	S	12,845	28.37%	3	1	4
Left-Green Movement	V	5,232	11.55%	1	0	1
Progressive Party	B	3,250	7.18%	1	0	1
Liberal Party	F	3,051	6.74%	0	0	0
Icelandic Movement – Living Country	I	1,599	3.53%	0	0	0
Valid votes		45,284	100.00%	10	2	12
Blank votes		611	1.33%			
Rejected votes – other		94	0.20%			
Total polled		45,989	84.25%			
Registered electors		54,584				

The following candidates were elected:

- Constituency seats - Ármann Kr. Ólafsson (D), 15,978.8 votes; Bjarni Benediktsson (D), 17,473.7 votes; Gunnar Svavarsson (S), 12,712.1 votes; Jón Gunnarsson (D), 14,476.1 votes; Katrín Júlíusdóttir (S), 11,224.4 votes; Ögmundur Jónasson (V), 5,199.0 votes; Ragnheiður Elín Árnadóttir (D), 12,896.4 votes; Siv Friðleifsdóttir (B), 3,169.0 votes; Þorgerður Katrín Gunnarsdóttir (D), 19,133.2 votes; and Þórunn Sveinbjarnardóttir (S), 9,623.2 votes.
- Compensatory seats - Árni Páll Árnason (S), 8,047.2 votes; and Ragnheiður Ríkharðsdóttir (D), 11,222.3 votes.

===== 2003 =====
Results of the 2003 parliamentary election held on 10 May 2003:

Party		Votes	%	Seats		
Party		Votes	%	Con.	Com.	Tot.
Independence Party	D	16,456	38.42%	4	1	5
Social Democratic Alliance	S	14,029	32.75%	4	0	4
Progressive Party	B	6,387	14.91%	1	0	1
Liberal Party	F	2,890	6.75%	0	1	1
Left-Green Movement	U	2,671	6.24%	0	0	0
New Force	N	399	0.93%	0	0	0
Valid votes		42,832	100.00%	9	2	11
Blank votes		372	0.86%			
Rejected votes – other		42	0.10%			
Total polled		43,246	88.54%			
Registered electors		48,842				

The following candidates were elected:

- Constituency seats - Árni Mathiesen (D), 16,147.7 votes; Gunnar Birgisson (D), 14,289.2 votes; Guðmundur Árni Stefánsson (S), 13,791.0 votes; Katrín Júlíusdóttir (S), 8,814.4 votes; Rannveig Guðmundsdóttir (S), 12,268.9 votes; Sigríður Anna Þórðardóttir (D), 13,080.9 votes; Siv Friðleifsdóttir (B), 6,298.0 votes; Þorgerður Katrín Gunnarsdóttir (D), 11,589.9 votes; and Þórunn Sveinbjarnardóttir (S), 10,534.0 votes.
- Compensatory seats - Bjarni Benediktsson (D), 9,923.4 votes; and Gunnar Örn Örlygsson (F), 2,868.0 votes.
