= Nichole Leigh Mosty =

Icelandic politician (born 1972)

Member of the Althing
- In office 6 December 2016 – 27 October 2017

Personal details
- Born: 19 October 1972 (age 53) Three Rivers, Michigan
- Party: Bright Future
- Education: University of Iceland

Nichole Leigh Mosty (born 19 October 1972) is an American-born Icelandic politician from Bright Future who served in the Parliament of Iceland.

== Early life ==
Mosty was born in Three Rivers, Michigan.

== Education ==
Mosty holds a degree from the University of Iceland. Mosty moved from the United States to Iceland in 1999.

== Career ==
She was elected in the 2016 parliamentary election for Reykjavík South. She was a candidate for Reykjavík City Council in 2018.

In May 2017, while making a speech for the first time at the parliamentary discussions called Eldhúsdagsumræður in Iceland, she teared up recounting her experience as an immigrant. She mentioned her relocation to Iceland sixteen years earlier and starting as a cleaner, as "[T]here were no other jobs for a person like me who almost spoke no Icelandic. I became isolated and met with prejudice in many places. But many things have changed, so here I stand, thanks to the Icelandic educational system."

== See also ==
- List of members of the Althing, 2016–2017
