= Eiríkur Björn Björgvinsson =

Icelandic politician (born 1966)

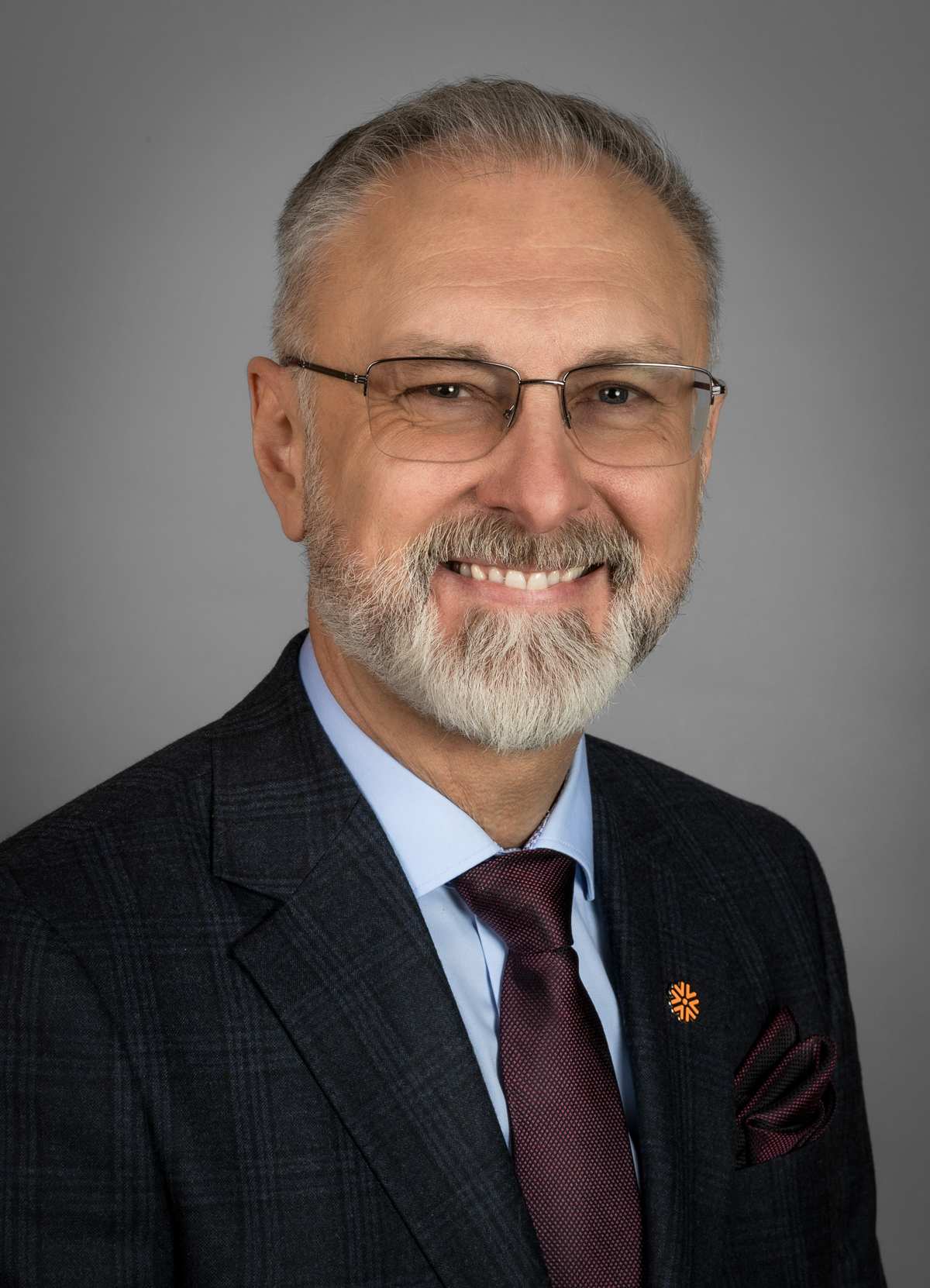

Member of the Althing
- Incumbent
- Assumed office 2024
- Constituency: Southwest

Personal details
- Born: 6 September 1966 (age 60) Reykjavík, Iceland
- Party: Viðreisn
- Education: German Sport University Cologne

Eiríkur Björn Björgvinsson (born 6 September 1966) is an Icelandic politician who was elected to the Althing in the 2024 Icelandic parliamentary election. He is also a former mayor of Akureyri and Fljótsdalshérað.

Eiríkur Björn graduated from Fjölbrautskólinn at Ármúli in 1987, completing a physical education teacher's degree at primary and secondary school level from the Icelandic School of Physical Education in 1990 and a diploma from the German Sport University Cologne in 1994, as well as a diploma in management from the Icelandic University of Education in 2000.

Eiríkur Björn was the youth and sports representative of Egilsstaðabær from 1994 to 1996, the sports and leisure representative of Akureyri from 1996 to 2002, and the mayor of Fljótsdalshérað from 2002 to 2010. He was the mayor of Akureyri from 2010 to 2018.

His wife is Alma Jóhanna Árnadóttir, born January 29, 1969 in Húsavík. She is a graphic designer from the Akureyri School of Fine Arts. They have three sons: Árna Björn, Birni Eiðar and Hákon Bjarnar.
