= Sigmar Guðmundsson =

Icelandic politician and media personality

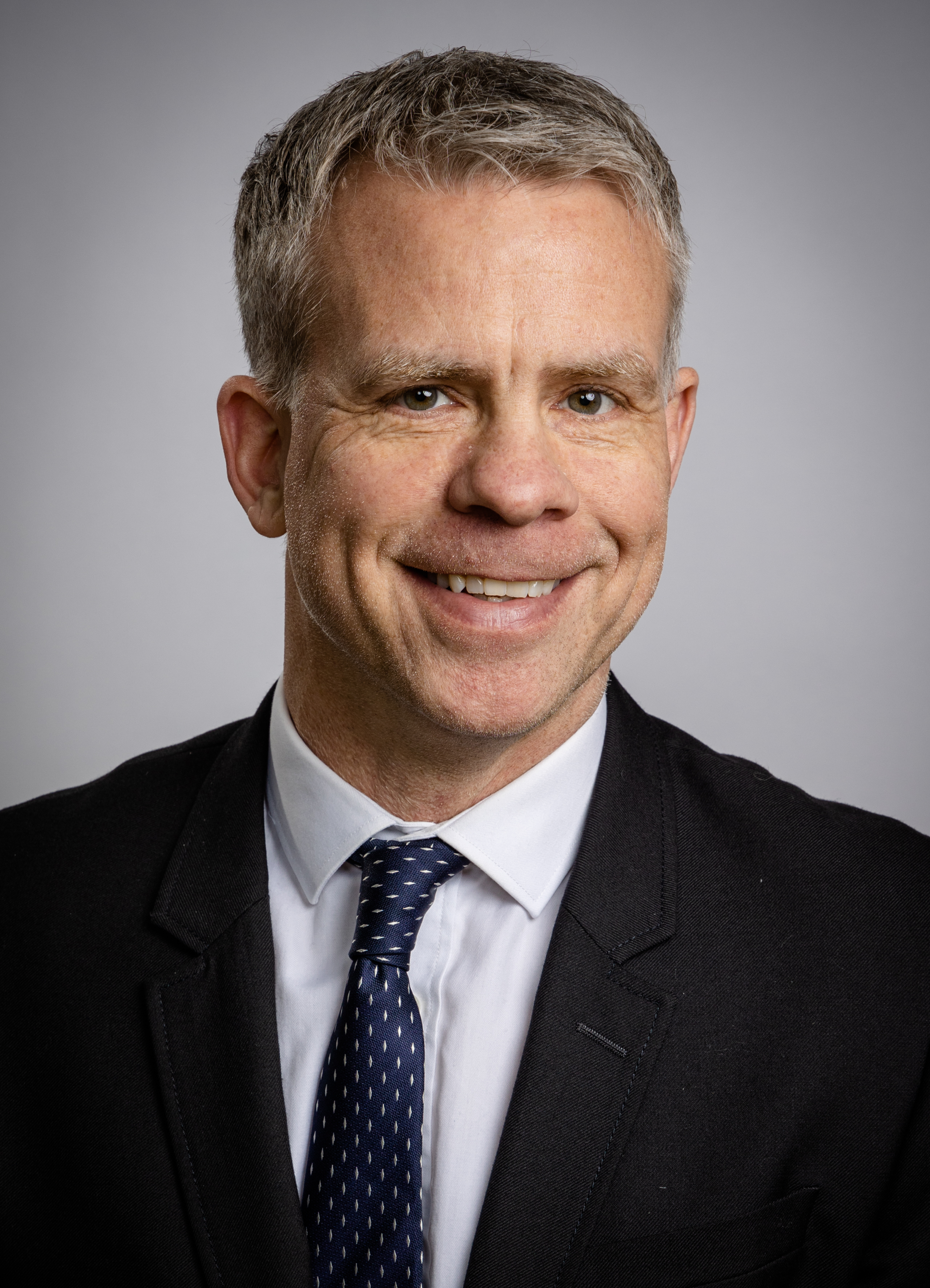
- Sigmar Guðmundsson in 2021

Member of the Althing
- Incumbent
- Assumed office 2021
- Constituency: Southwest

Personal details
- Born: 7 April 1969 (age 57)
- Party: Viðreisn
- Spouse: Juliana Einarsdottir
- Children: 5
- Education: German Sport University Cologne

Sigmar Guðmundsson (born 7 April 1969) is an Icelandic politician from Viðreisn. He is a member of the Parliament of Iceland for the Southwest constituency. He worked for years in the media but was elected to parliament in the 2021 Icelandic parliamentary election.

During his high school years, Sigmar participated in the Icelandic High School Speech and Debate Competition (Morfís) on behalf of Fjölbrautaskólinn í Garðabæ and was chosen as the national speaker in 1988 and 1990. He began his media career in radio on X-ið and Aðalstöðinn, but since the mid-1990s has mostly worked at RÚV, apart from a two-year stint at Stöð 2 at the turn of the century. Within the walls of RÚV, Sigmar worked in various programming, for example as a journalist in Kastljós and an interviewer in Gettu Betur in 2006-2008 and in Útsvari in 2007-2017 (along with Thóra Arnórsdóttir). He was in charge of the programs Inter Nos on RÚV and Morgunútvarp Rásar 2.

After 30 years in the media, including 23 years at RÚV, Sigmar decided to step aside and run for parliament on behalf of Viðreisn in 2021.
