= Óskarsdóttir =

Patronmyic surname list

Óskarsdóttir is an Icelandic patronymic (not a surname), literally meaning "daughter of Óskar". It may refer to:

- Jónína Björk Óskarsdóttir (born 1953), Icelandic politician
- Steinunn Valdís Óskarsdóttir (born 1965), Icelandic politician
- Valdís Óskarsdóttir (born 1950), Icelandic film editor
