= Nanna Margrét Gunnlaugsdóttir =

Icelandic politician (born 1978)

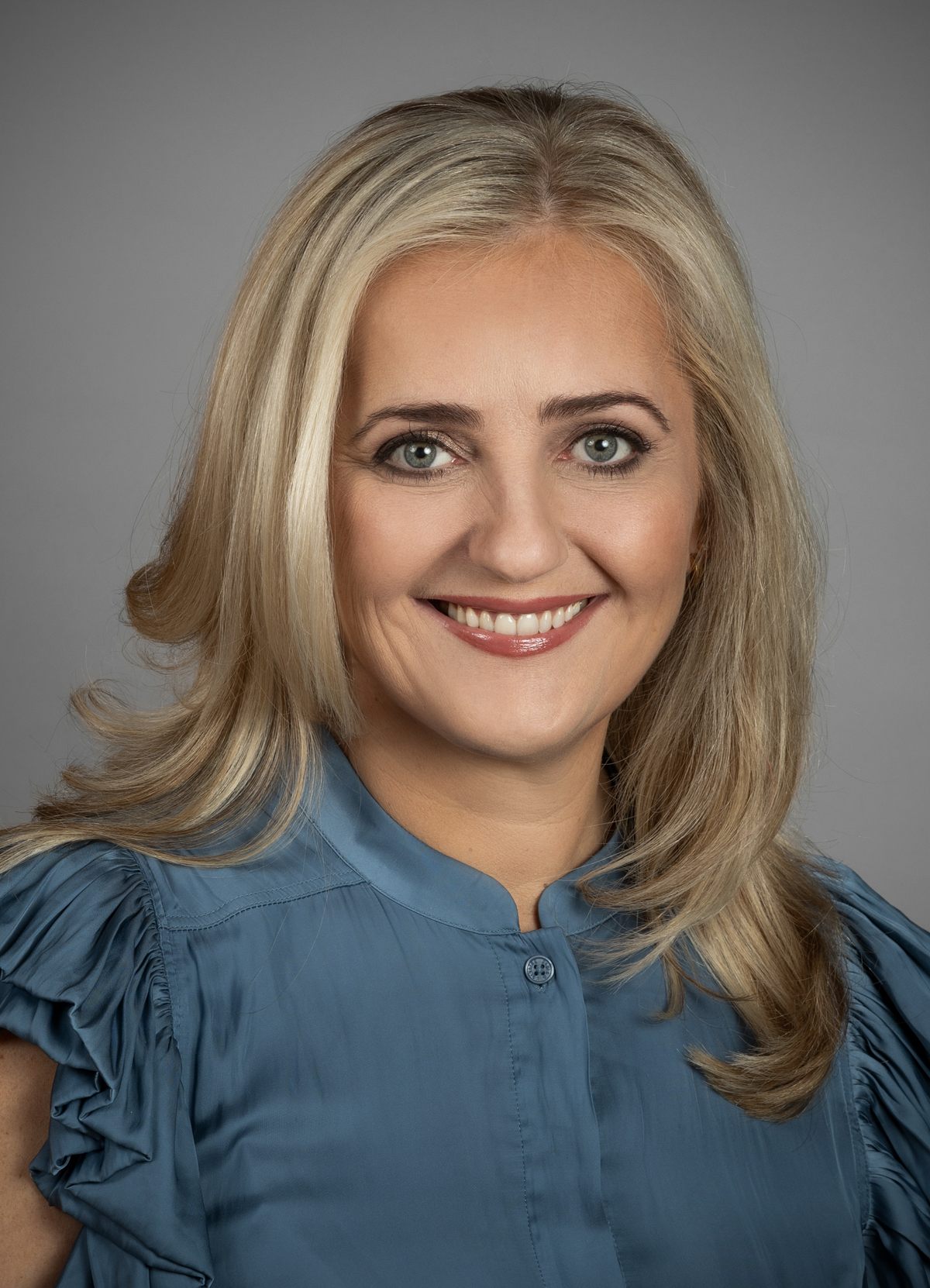

Member of the Althing
- Incumbent
- Assumed office 2024
- Constituency: Southwest

Personal details
- Born: 9 April 1978 (age 48)
- Party: Centre Party
- Relations: Sigmundur Davíð Gunnlaugsson (brother)
- Parent: Gunnlaugur Sigmundsson

Nanna Margrét Gunnlaugsdóttir (born 9 April 1978) is an Icelandic politician from the Centre Party. In the 2024 Icelandic parliamentary election she was elected to the Althing.

== See also ==
- List of members of the Althing, 2024–2028
