= Steindór =

Icelandic masculine given name

Steindór is an Icelandic masculine given name. Notable people with the name include:

- Steindór Andersen (born 1954), Icelandic musician
- Jón Steindór Valdimarsson (born 1958), Icelandic politician
