= Rósa Guðbjartsdóttir =

Icelandic politician (born 1965)

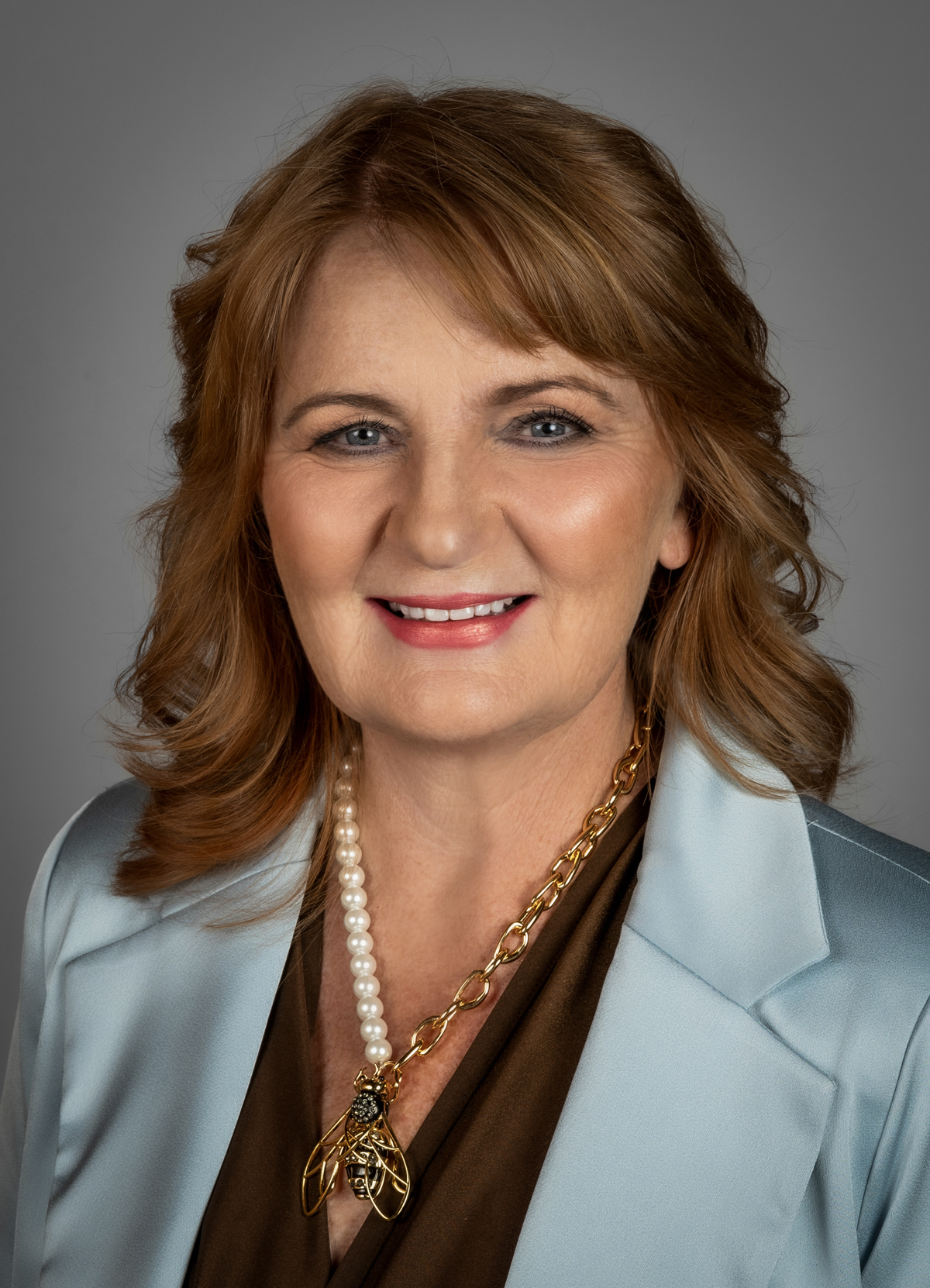

Member of the Althing
- Incumbent
- Assumed office 2024
- Constituency: Southwest

Personal details
- Born: 29 November 1965 (age 60)
- Party: Independence
- Education: University of Iceland

Rósa Guðbjartsdóttir (born 29 November 1965) is an Icelandic political scientist and politician from the Independence Party. She has been the mayor of Hafnarfjarðar since 2018. In the 2024 Icelandic parliamentary election she was elected to the Althing.

Rósa was raised in Hafnarfjörður and graduated from Flensborg School. She received a BA in political science from the University of Iceland. She worked for many years as a reporter for the television station Stöð 2 and the radio station Bylgjan. She was the executive director of the Children with Cancer Support Association from 2001 to 2006. Rósa was a deputy member of parliament for the Independence Party in the Southwest Constituency from 2007 to 2009, has served on the Hafnarfjörður municipal council since 2006 and has been mayor of Hafnarfjörður since 2018. Rósa is scheduled to step down as mayor at the turn of the year 2025 and will be succeeded by Valdimar Víðisson. Rósa was elected to the Althing in the 2024 Icelandic parliamentary election. It was planned that Rósa would take over the position of chairman of the town council from Valdimar Víðisson when he succeeded her as mayor, but that will change as Rósa takes a seat in the Althing.

== See also ==
- List of members of the Althing, 2024–2028
