= Þórhildur Sunna Ævarsdóttir =

Icelandic human rights lawyer, journalist, and former politician

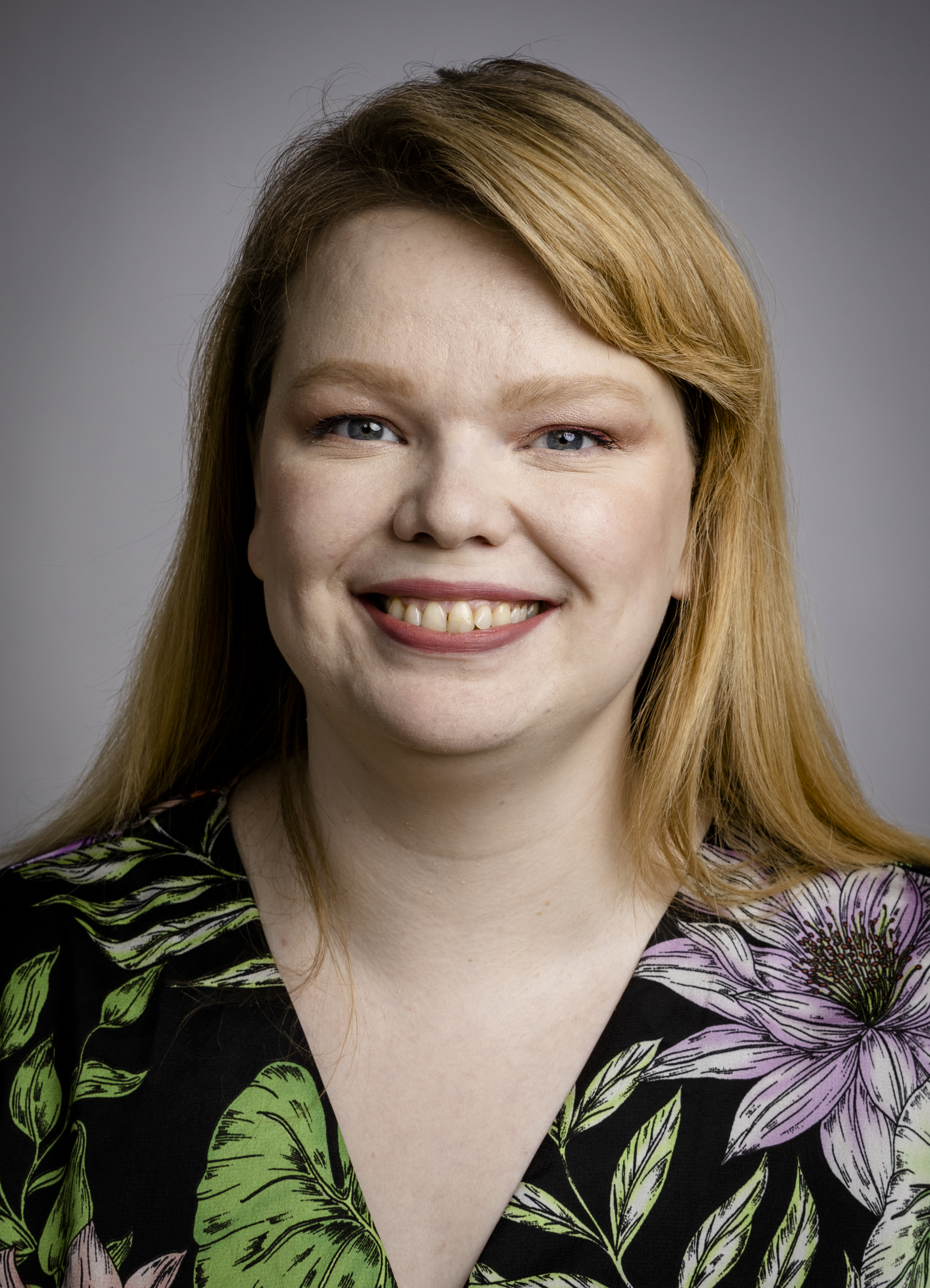
Þórhildur Sunna Ævarsdóttir 2021

Þórhildur Sunna Ævarsdóttir (born 6 May 1987 in Akranes) is an Icelandic politician, human rights lawyer and journalist, who represented the Pirate Party.

== Biography ==
She has a Master of Laws from the University of Utrecht in international human rights and criminal law. After her studies she became an intern at the International Court of Justice in the Hague, did legal volunteer work and worked as a freelance journalist for the Icelandic web portals kvennabladid.is and grapevine.is.

In 2016–2017 Þórhildur was chairman of the Pirate Party, which is an organizational post. She was elected to the Althing in 2016 for the Southwest Constituency. In 2017 she was selected as the spokesperson for the Pirates, a position that makes her the public face of the party, which does not have a formal leader.

In February 2018, Þórhildur claimed that Ásmundur Friðriksson, a member of the Althing from the Independence Party, had used public money for his personal use. In the past five years, Ásmundur had received more than ISK 23.5 million in driving-related expenses, including for trips organized by ÍNN. In response, Ásmundur complained to the Althing ethics committee, who determined in June 2018 that Þórhildur had violated the Althing ethics code; this decision was confirmed by the presidium in June 2019. In December 2019, Ásmundur sent a letter to Liliane Maury Pasquier, the President of the Parliamentary Assembly of the Council of Europe, requesting that Þórhildur be stripped of her rights at the Council of Europe. Pasquier refused to do so.
