= Benedikt Jóhannesson =

Icelandic politician and businessman (born 1955)

Minister for Finance and Economic Affairs
- In office 11 January 2017 – 30 November 2017
- Prime Minister: Bjarni Benediktsson
- Preceded by: Bjarni Benediktsson
- Succeeded by: Bjarni Benediktsson

Leader of Viðreisn
- In office 24 May 2016 – 12 October 2017
- Preceded by: Position established
- Succeeded by: Þorgerður Katrín Gunnarsdóttir

Personal details
- Born: 4 May 1955 (age 70) Reykjavík, Iceland
- Party: Viðreisn
- Education: University of Wisconsin, Madison (BS); Florida State University (MS, PhD)

Benedikt Jóhannesson (born 4 May 1955) is an Icelandic publisher, businessman and politician. He is the founder and former chairman of Viðreisn and served as Iceland's Minister of Finance from 11 January 2017 to 30 November 2017.

Benedikt is the CEO of publishing company Heimur, in which he owns 73.5% of the shares. He has run this company since 2000. He holds a Ph.D. in Statistics and Mathematics from Florida State University. He has also run the consulting company Talnakönnun, a firm specialising in data analysis, since 1983. He has been a board member of some of Iceland's largest companies and published a collection of short stories. He is the publisher of a weekly newsletter on Icelandic business and economics called Iceland Review.

In June 2014 he founded Viðreisn as a political network after leaving the Independence Party. Benedikt made it a political party 24 May 2016 with him as chairman. He was elected to the Althing for the Southwest Constituency in the 2016 election, but failed to get reelected in 2017. In October 2017, Benedikt resigned as leader of Viðreisn, citing the party's poor performance in polling in the run up to the Icelandic election that month as the reason behind his departure.

Party political offices
New office	Leader of Viðreisn; 2016–2017	Succeeded by Þorgerður Katrín Gunnarsdóttir
Political offices
Preceded by Bjarni Benediktsson	Minister for Finance and Economic Affairs; 2017	Succeeded by Bjarni Benediktsson
