= Katrín Júlíusdóttir =

Icelandic politician (born 1974)

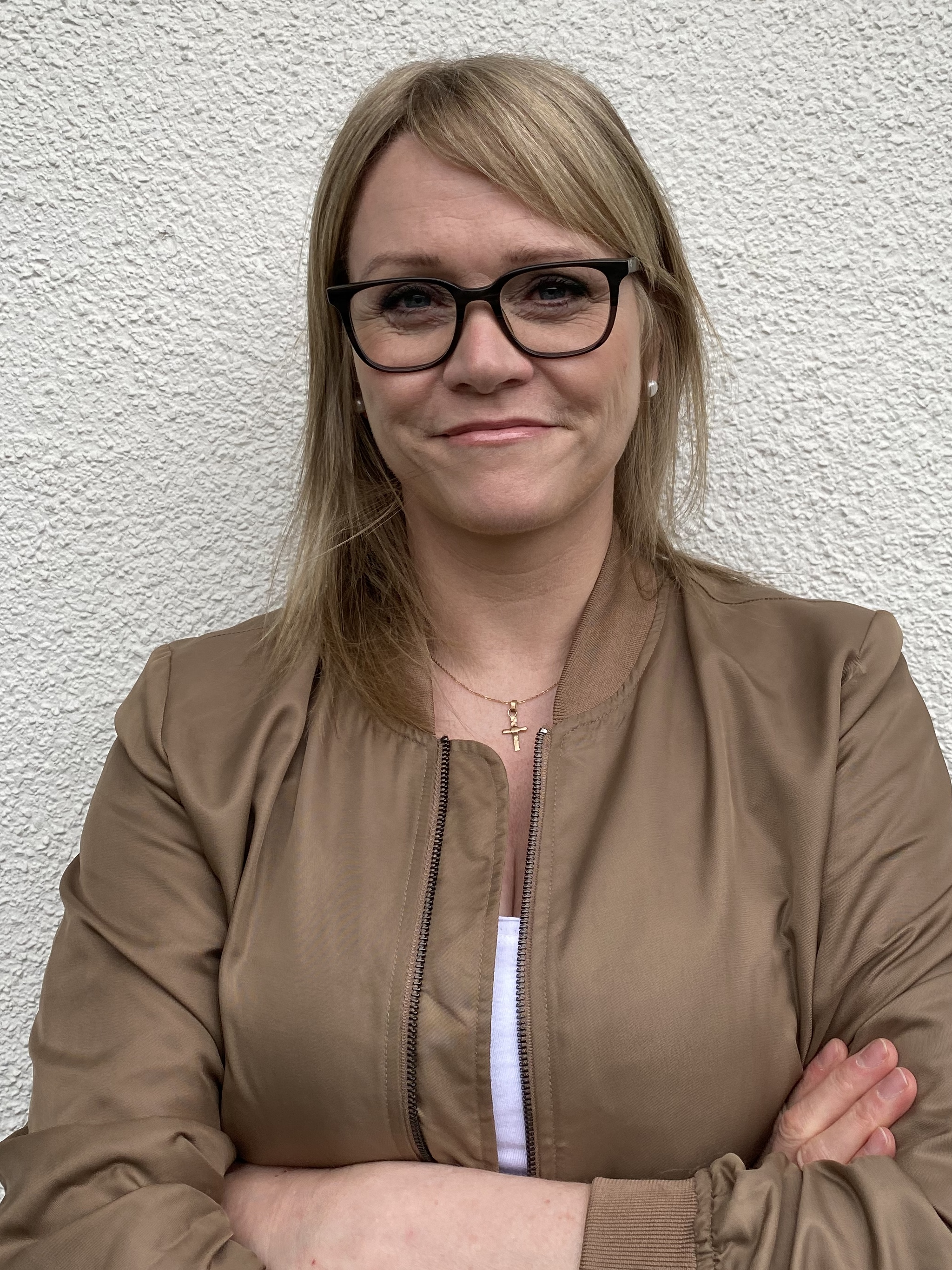
- Katrín in 2020

Minister for Finance and Economic Affairs
- In office 1 October 2012 – 23 May 2013
- Prime Minister: Jóhanna Sigurðardóttir
- Preceded by: Oddný G. Harðardóttir
- Succeeded by: Bjarni Benediktsson

Minister for Industry, Energy and Tourism
- In office 10 May 2009 – 4 September 2012
- Prime Minister: Jóhanna Sigurðardóttir
- Preceded by: Össur Skarphéðinsson
- Succeeded by: Steingrímur J. Sigfússon (as Minister of Industries and Innovation)

Personal details
- Born: 23 November 1974 (age 51) Reykjavík, Iceland
- Party: Social Democratic Alliance
- Spouse: Bjarni M. Bjarnason
- Children: 4

Katrín Júlíusdóttir (born 23 November 1974), is a former Icelandic politician and author. She was elected to the Parliament of Iceland in 2003 and served as Minister of Industry, Energy and Tourism from May 2009 to September 2012 and as Minister of Finance and Economy from 2012 to 2013. In 2016, she left politics and has since been the Managing Director of Finance Iceland (2016-2022) and is currently a consultant at Athygli - Consultancy in Reykjavík. In 2020, she received the Svartfuglinn-Award for her first crime novel, Sykur (en: Sugar), published by Veröld in October 2020. Katrín is married to the Icelandic author Bjarni M. Bjarnason and they have four sons.
