= Guðmundur Ari Sigurjónsson =

Icelandic politician (born 1988)

Guðmundur Ari Sigurjónsson (GAS)
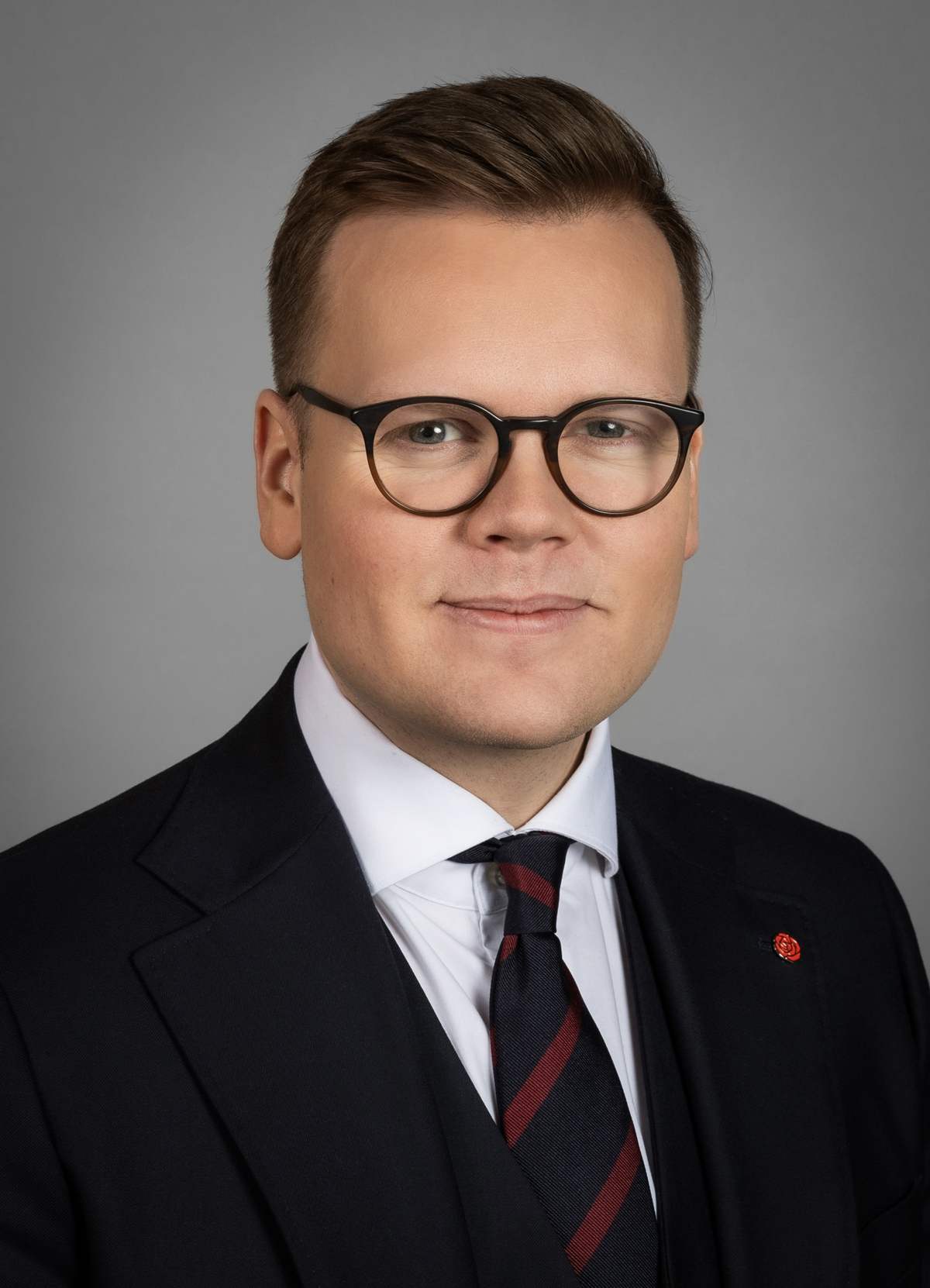

Member of the Althing
- Incumbent
- Assumed office 30 November 2024
- Constituency: Southwest

Personal details
- Born: 12 September 1988 (age 38)
- Party: Social Democratic Alliance
- Education: University of Iceland

Guðmundur Ari Sigurjónsson (born 12 September 1988) is an Icelandic politician and member of the Althing. A member of the Social Democratic Alliance, he has represented the Southwest constituency since November 2024.

Guðmundur was born on 12 September 1988. He is the son of Sigurjón Gunnarsson and Edda Kjartansdóttir. He grew up in Seltjarnarnes and was educated at the Valhúsaskóli. He later studied at the Fjölbrautaskólinn við Ármúla, Verkmenntaskóli Austurlands and Fjölbrautaskólinn í Breiðholti. He has Bachelor of Arts degree in leisure and social studies from the University of Iceland (HÍ).

Guðmundur was a social worker and project manager at the Selið community centre and Skelin youth centre in Seltjarnarnes. He was as a project manager at the Football Association of Iceland. He is a senior adviser at the Icelandic Centre for Research and is responsible for coordinating the European Solidarity Corps as well as promoting Erasmus+ activities in Iceland. He was chairman of the Association of Leisure Service Professionals (Félag fagfólks í frítímaþjónustu). He was also an assistant and part-time teacher at HÍ's School of Education.

Guðmundur was briefly affiliated with the right wing Independence Party before joining the Social Democratic Alliance (Samfylkingin). He was elected to the municipal council in Seltjarnarnes at the 2014 municipal elections. He was elected chairman of Samfylkingin's executive committee in October 2022, defeating incumbent Kjartan Valgarðsson. He was elected to the Althing at the 2024 parliamentary election.

Guðmundur is married to sports scientist Nanna Kaaber Árnadóttir and has two sons and a daughter.
