= Bergþór Ólason =

Icelandic politician (born 1975)

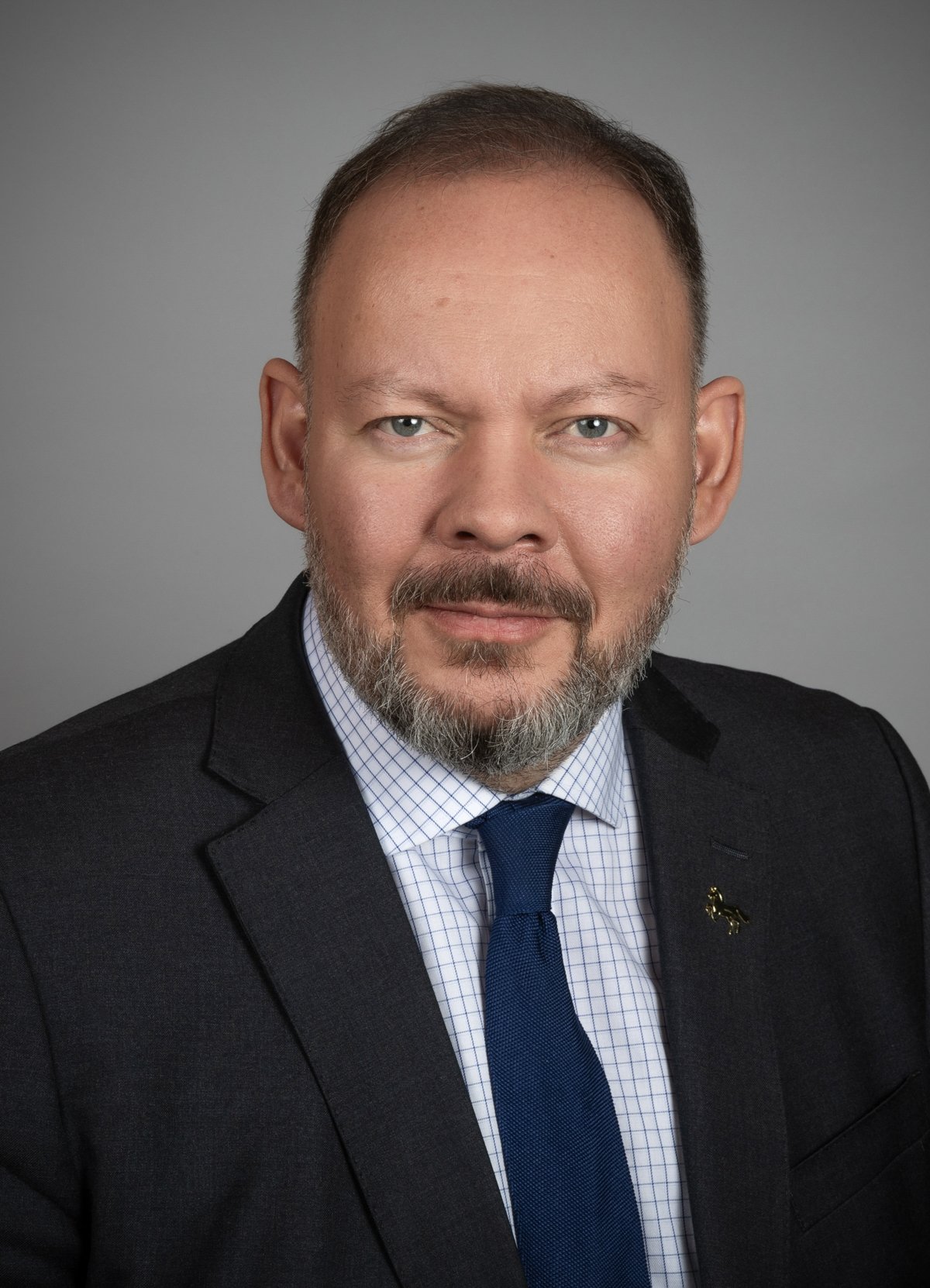
- Official portrait, 2025

Member of the Althing
- Incumbent
- Assumed office 2017
- Constituency: Southwest

Personal details
- Born: 26 September 1957 (age 68) Akranes, Iceland
- Party: Centre Party

Bergþór Ólason (born 26 September 1975) is an Icelandic politician from the Centre Party. He has represented Northwest in the Parliament of Iceland since 2017.
