= Rósa Björk Brynjólfsdóttir =

Icelandic politician (born 1975)

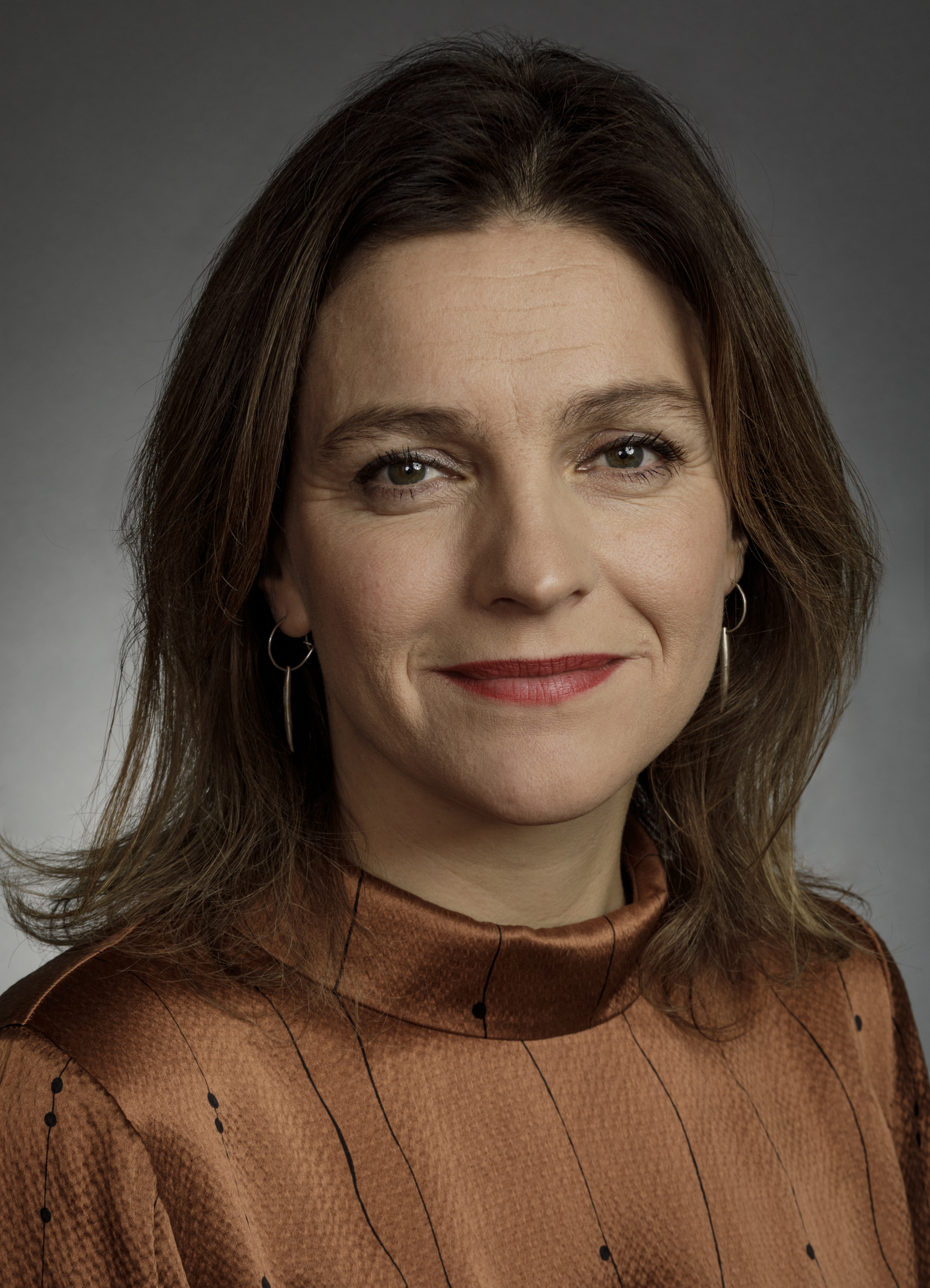
- Official portrait, 2017

Chair of the Left-Green Movement
- Incumbent
- Assumed office 8 March 2026
- Preceded by: Svandís Svavarsdóttir

Member of the Althing
- In office 29 October 2016 – 25 September 2021
- Constituency: Southwest

Personal details
- Born: 9 February 1975 (age 51) Hafnarfjörður, Iceland
- Party: Left-Green Movement (2013–2020; since 2024)
- Other political affiliations: Social Democratic Alliance (2020–2024)
- Spouse: Kristján Guy Burgess
- Children: 3
- Education: University of Iceland (B.A.)

Rósa Björk Brynjólfsdóttir (born 9 February 1975) is an Icelandic politician who was a member of the Althing (Iceland's parliament) for the Southwest Constituency from 2016 to 2021 and a media representative of the Ministry of Finance from 2010 to 2014.

She left the Left-Green Movement in 2020, due to dissatisfaction with the policy of Katrín Jakobsdóttir's policies on matters of refugees and asylum seekers.
