= Kolbeinn Óttarsson Proppé =

Politician, Member of the Parliament of Iceland

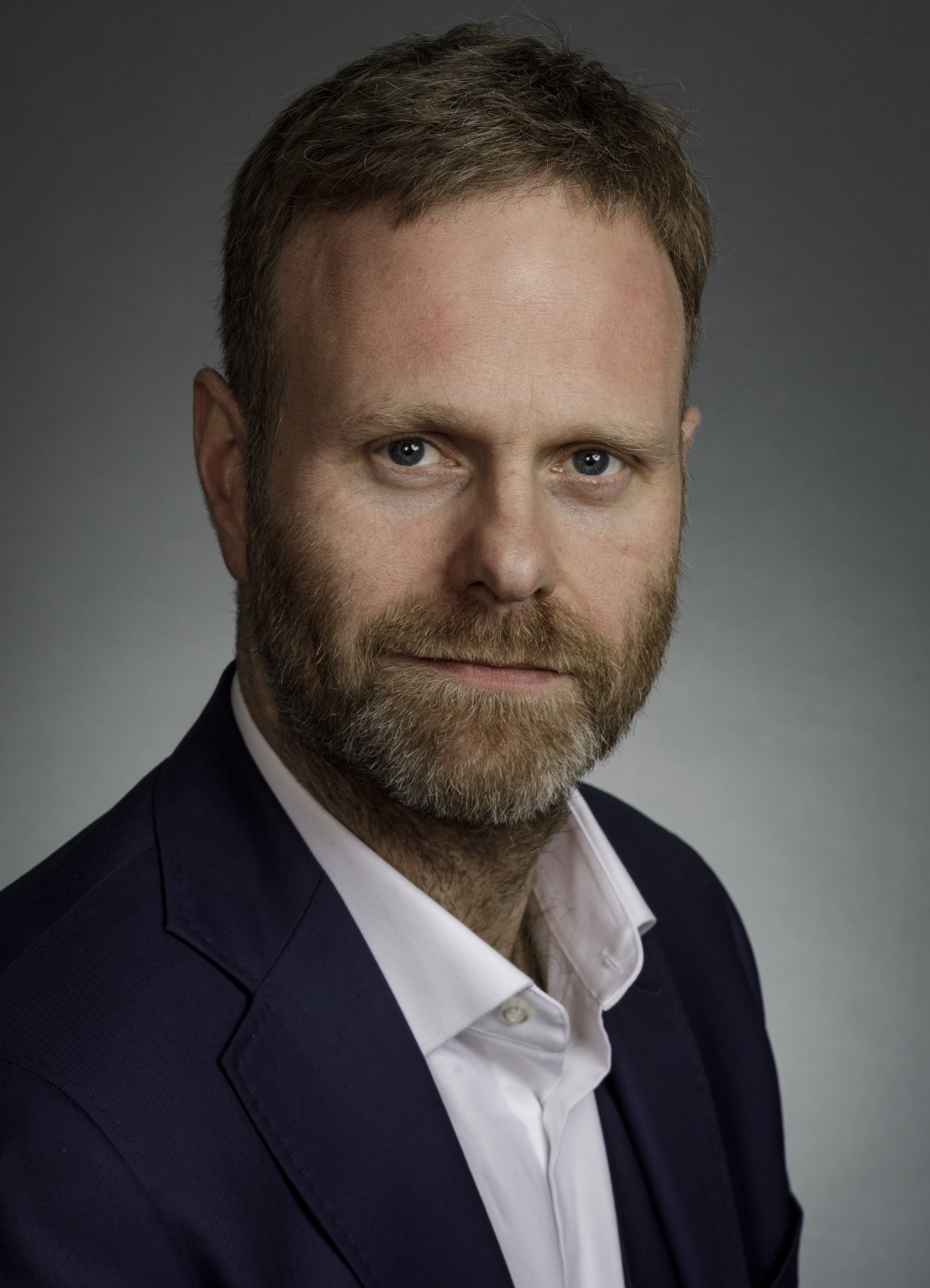
- Born: December 19, 1972 (age 53); Reykjavík
- Occupation: Member of the Althing
- Political party: Left-Green Movement
- Board member of: Environment and Transport Committee, Constitutional and Monitoring Committee, Iceland Delegation to the Nordic Council
- Parent(s): Óttar Proppé, Guðný Ásólfsdóttir

Kolbeinn Óttarsson Proppé is an Icelandic politician who served as an MP for the Reykjavík South. He received a BA in history at University of Iceland, and is a former journalist of the Icelandic newspaper Fréttablaðið. He was elected to the Althing in 2016, and served there until 2021.
