= Ásta Guðrún Helgadóttir =

Icelandic politician (born 1990)

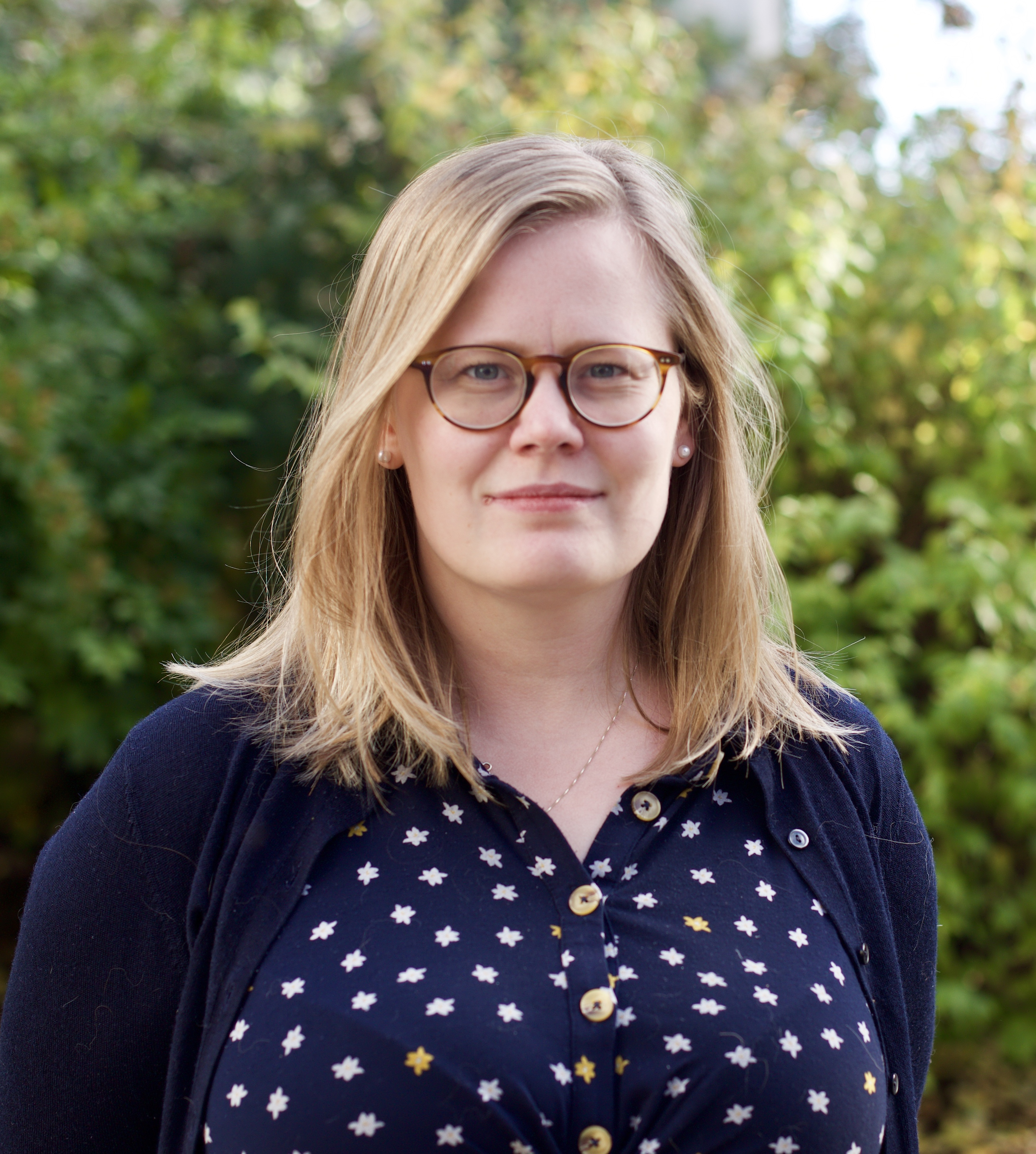
- Ásta in 2019

Member of Parliament for Reykjavík South
- In office 2015–2017
- Preceded by: Jón Þór Ólafsson

Personal details
- Born: 5 February 1990 (age 36) Reykjavík, Iceland
- Party: Pirate Party

Ásta Guðrún Helgadóttir (born 5 February 1990) is an Icelandic politician who was a Pirate Party member of the Icelandic parliament from 2015 to 2017. She represented Reykjavík South.

== Early life and education ==
Ásta was born in Reykjavik to Helgi Njálsson (b. 1965) and Ingibjörg Sara Benediktsdóttir (b. 1965). She completed an undergraduate degree in history at the University of Iceland in 2014. Her BA thesis was on the history of the censorship of pornography in Iceland. She also studied philosophy at the University of Warsaw in 2012, and Persian at the University of Tehran in the same year.

== Political career ==
Ásta first became involved with the Pirate Party in Iceland and internationally in Spring 2013. She was an intern at the office of Pirate MEP Amelia Andersdotter in the European Parliament. Following the 2013 Icelandic parliamentary election, she became a deputy MP.

Ásta replaced Jón Þór Ólafsson as Pirate Party MP for Reykjavik Constituency South in 2015 when he stepped down from the role. For the remainder of the 2011 parliamentary term, from 2015 to 2016, she served as a member of Environment and Communications Committee and as an observer on the Foreign Affairs Committee. Explaining the Pirate Party's success in the polls, Ásta said "Iceland is an unusual place, politically speaking. There’s a void in Icelandic politics when it comes to liberal parties. In Denmark and Sweden, there are many liberal parties, so there is less space for a Pirate Party. They have parties that are consistently liberal, and have been since the ‘60s. There’s a reason Denmark was the first country to legalise porn in 1969. In Iceland, there’s a lot of social conservatism, even though people want to be libertarians as far as the market, etcetera. What the Pirates are trying to do is more of social liberalism."

Since 2016, Ásta has been the deputy chair of the Pirate Party's parliamentary group. Following the release of the Panama Papers in April 2016 that implicated, among others, then-Icelandic Prime Minister Sigmundur Davíð Gunnlaugsson, Iceland saw a number of anti-government protests. Ásta witnessed some of the protests, that took place outside the parliament building, from within parliament. She told BBC News that "Monday's protests were definitely something that Iceland has never seen before and the current situation is entirely unprecedented in Icelandic politics. I was inside looking out of the window and was startled by the egg thrown at the window, but the protest was 99% peaceful. I heard there could have been 22,000 at the protests. That would be 6% of the whole population - one of the largest protests we have had. It was a good atmosphere. I have never seen Iceland react in this way before."

== Publications ==
- Ásta Guðrún Helgadóttir (July 2014). "The Icelandic initiative for pornography censorship". Porn Studies. 1 (3): 285–298. doi:10.1080/23268743.2014.928462.
