= Jónína Björk Óskarsdóttir =

Icelandic politician (born 1953)

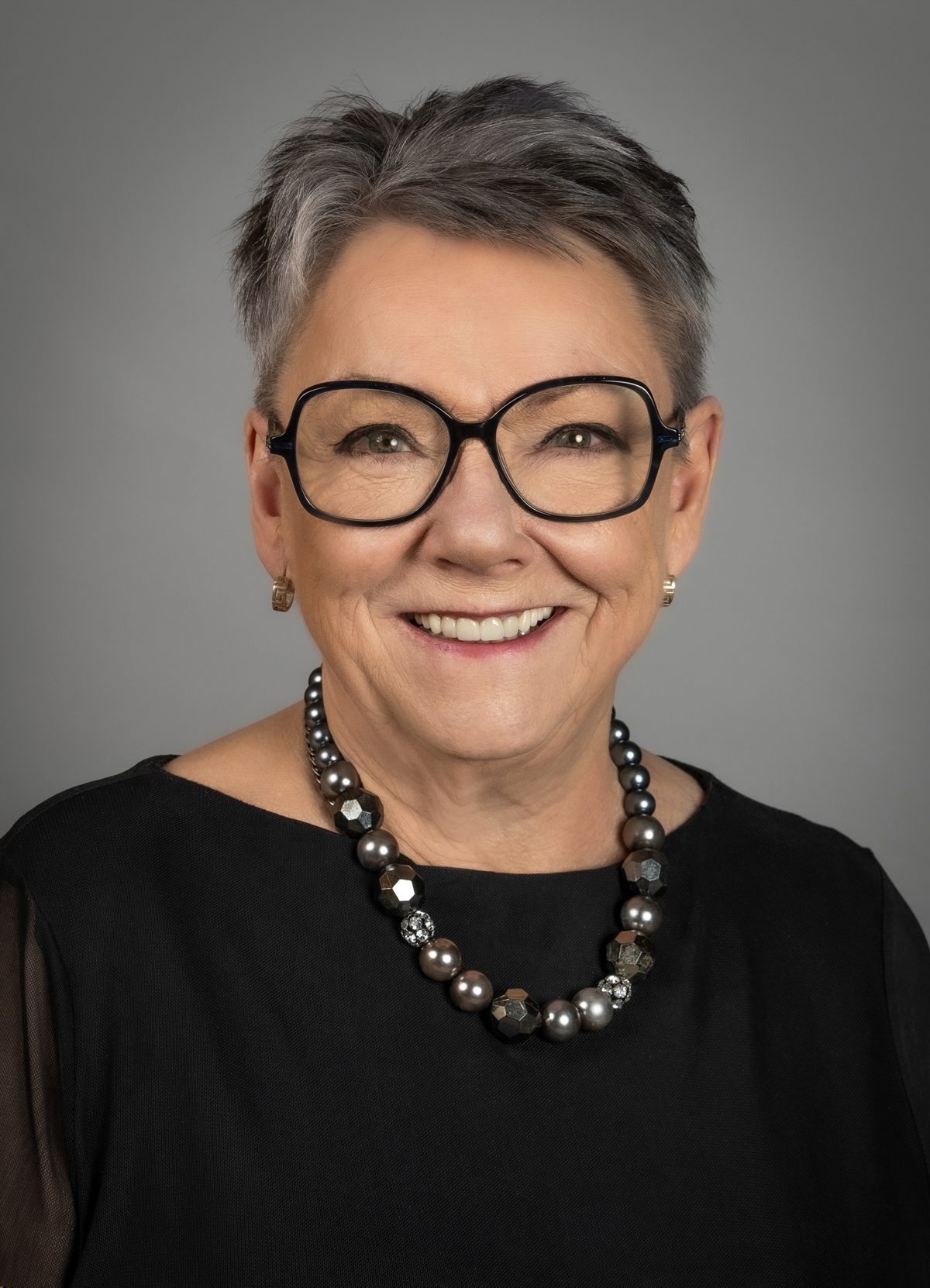

Member of the Althing
- Incumbent
- Assumed office 2024
- Constituency: Southwest

Personal details
- Party: People's Party

Jónína Björk Óskarsdóttir (born January 25, 1953) is an Icelandic politician from the People's Party. In the 2024 Icelandic parliamentary election she was elected to the Althing.

She had previously been in parliament as a substitute MP intermittently since 2018. She was office manager of the People's Party.

== See also ==
- List of members of the Althing, 2024–2028
