= Jón Steindór Valdimarsson =

Icelandic politician (born 1958)

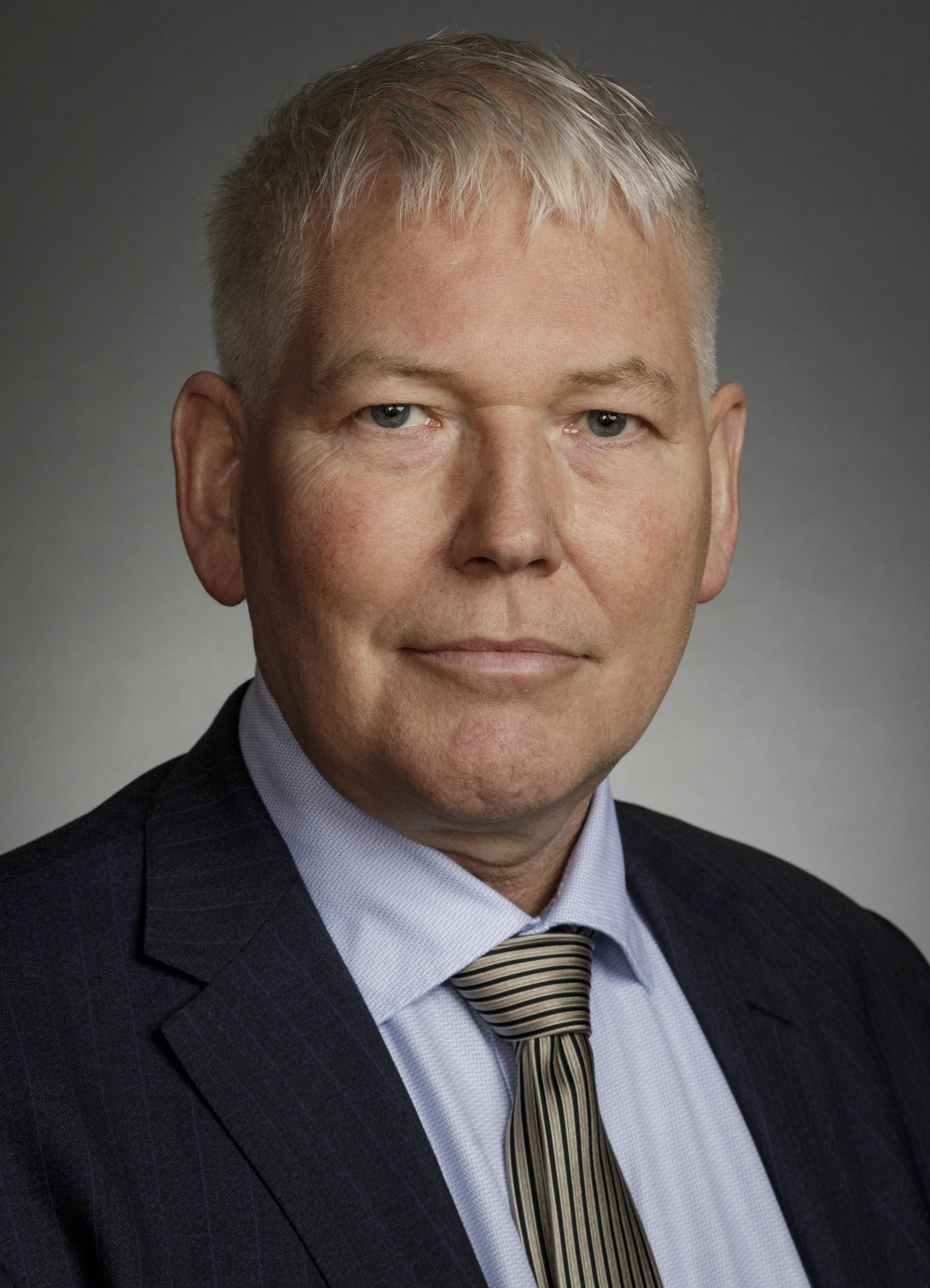
Member of Parliament Jón Steindór Valdimarsson after the 2017 parliamentary elections

Jón Steindór Valdimarsson (born 27 June 1958) is an Icelandic politician from Viðreisn. He represented the Southwest constituency in the Parliament of Iceland from 2017 to 2021. He was born in Akureyri. Jón Steindór graduated with stúdentspróf from MA-collage in 1978, a law degree from the University of Iceland in 1985 and an MPM from the Department of Engineering at Reykjavik University in 2013.

In 2022, he founded the European Movement (Evrópuhreyfingin) which wishes Iceland to join the European Union.
