= Guðjón S. Brjánsson =

Icelandic politician

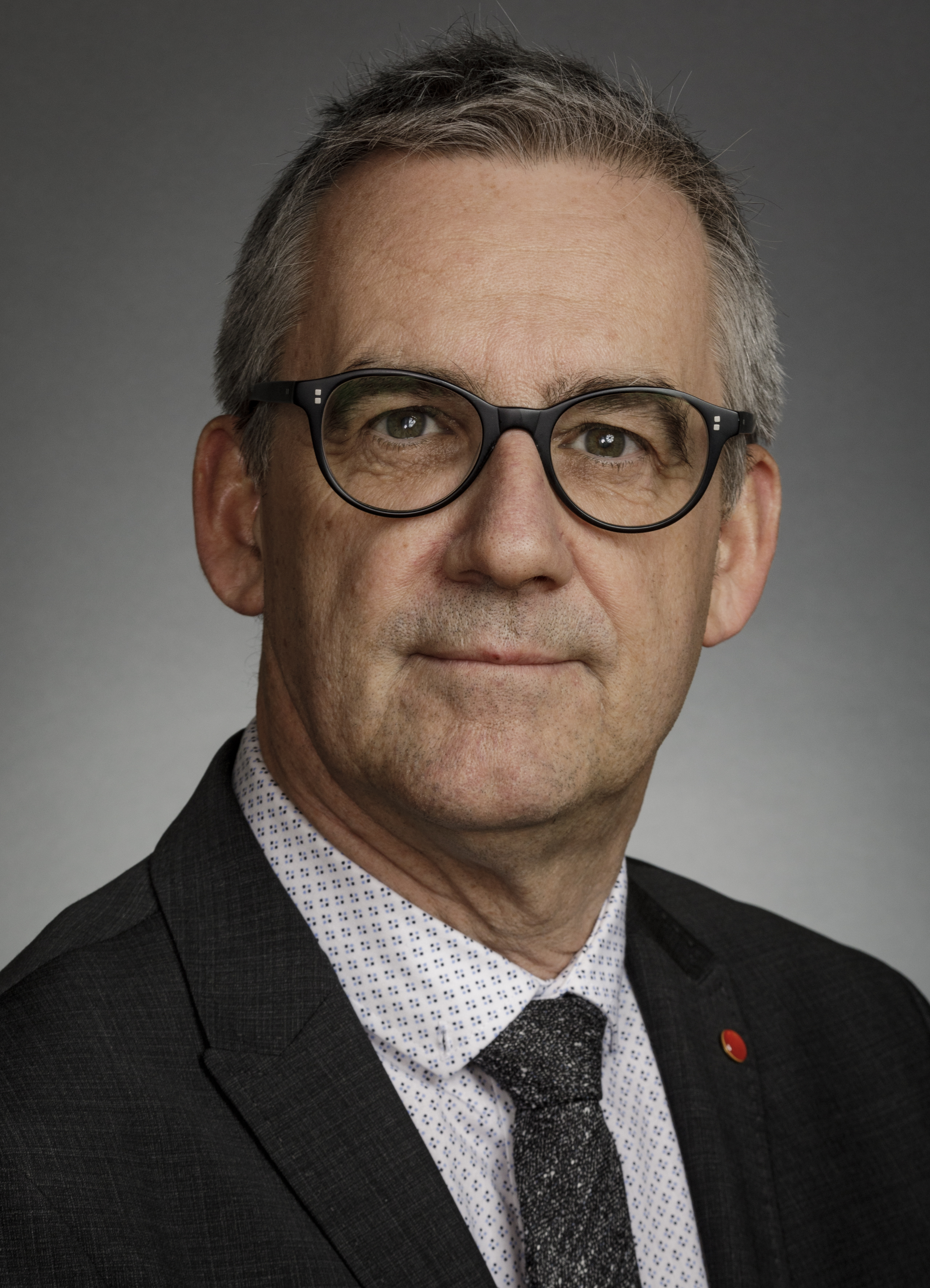
Guðjón S. Brjánsson 2017

Guðjón S. Brjánsson (born 22 March 1955) is an Icelandic politician from the Social Democratic Alliance. He was born in Akureyri, and represented Northwest in the Parliament of Iceland from 2016 to 2021.
