= Bryndís Haraldsdóttir =

Icelandic politician (born 1976)

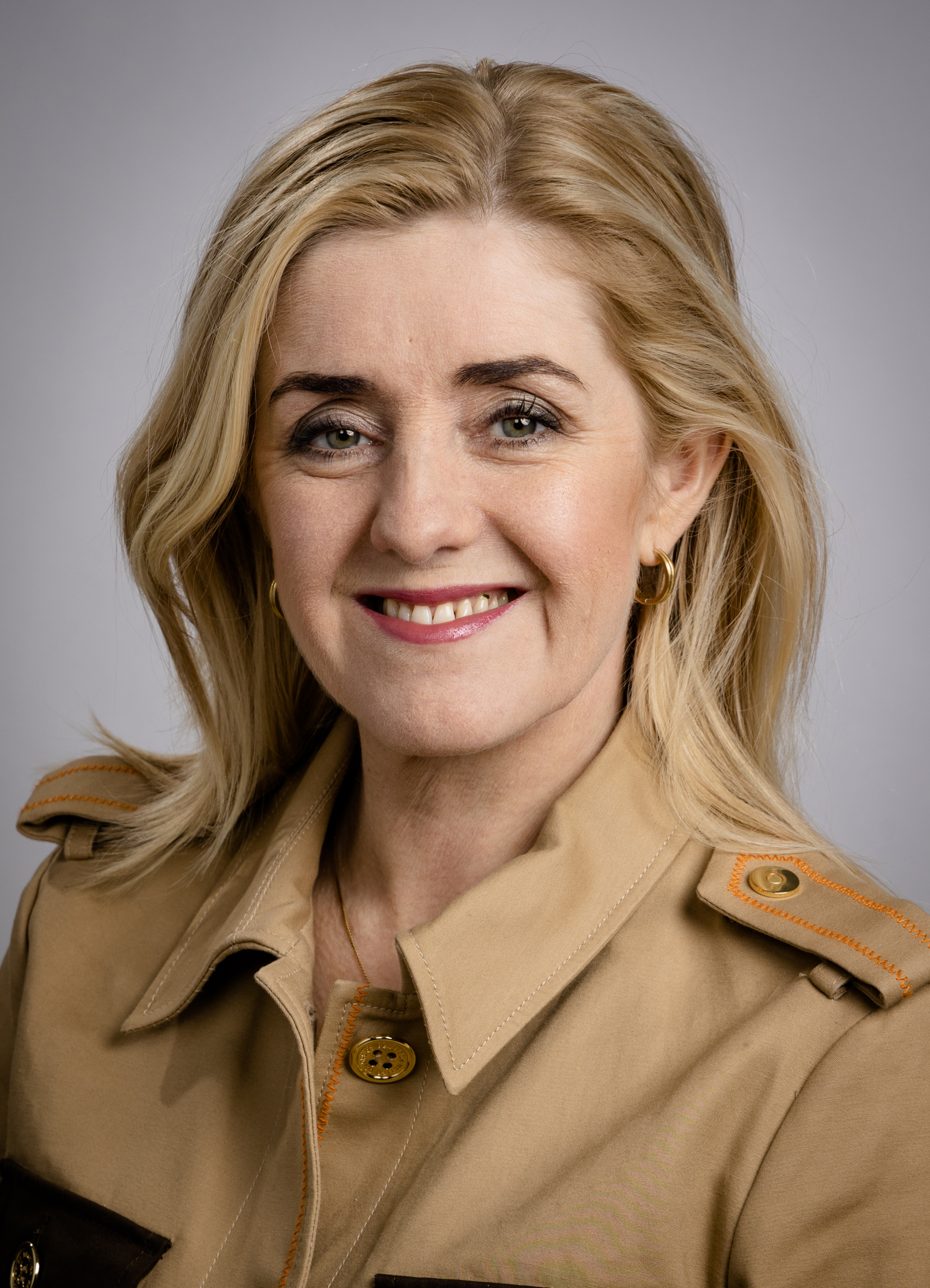

25th President of the West Nordic Council
- Incumbent
- Assumed office 2016
- Preceded by: Lars-Emil Johansen

President of the Nordic Council
- In office 1 January 2024 – 31 December 2024
- Preceded by: Jorodd Asphjell
- Succeeded by: Heléne Björklund

Personal details
- Born: 29 December 1976 (age 49) Reykjavík, Iceland
- Party: Independence
- Education: Technical University of Iceland

Bryndís Haraldsdóttir (born 1976) is an Icelandic politician who is a member of the Althing representing the Southwest constituency and chair of the Judicial Affairs and Education Committee. She is also the 25th and incumbent president of the West Nordic Council, succeeding the former prime minister of Greenland, Lars-Emil Johansen in 2016.
