= Óli Björn Kárason =

Icelandic politician (born 1960)

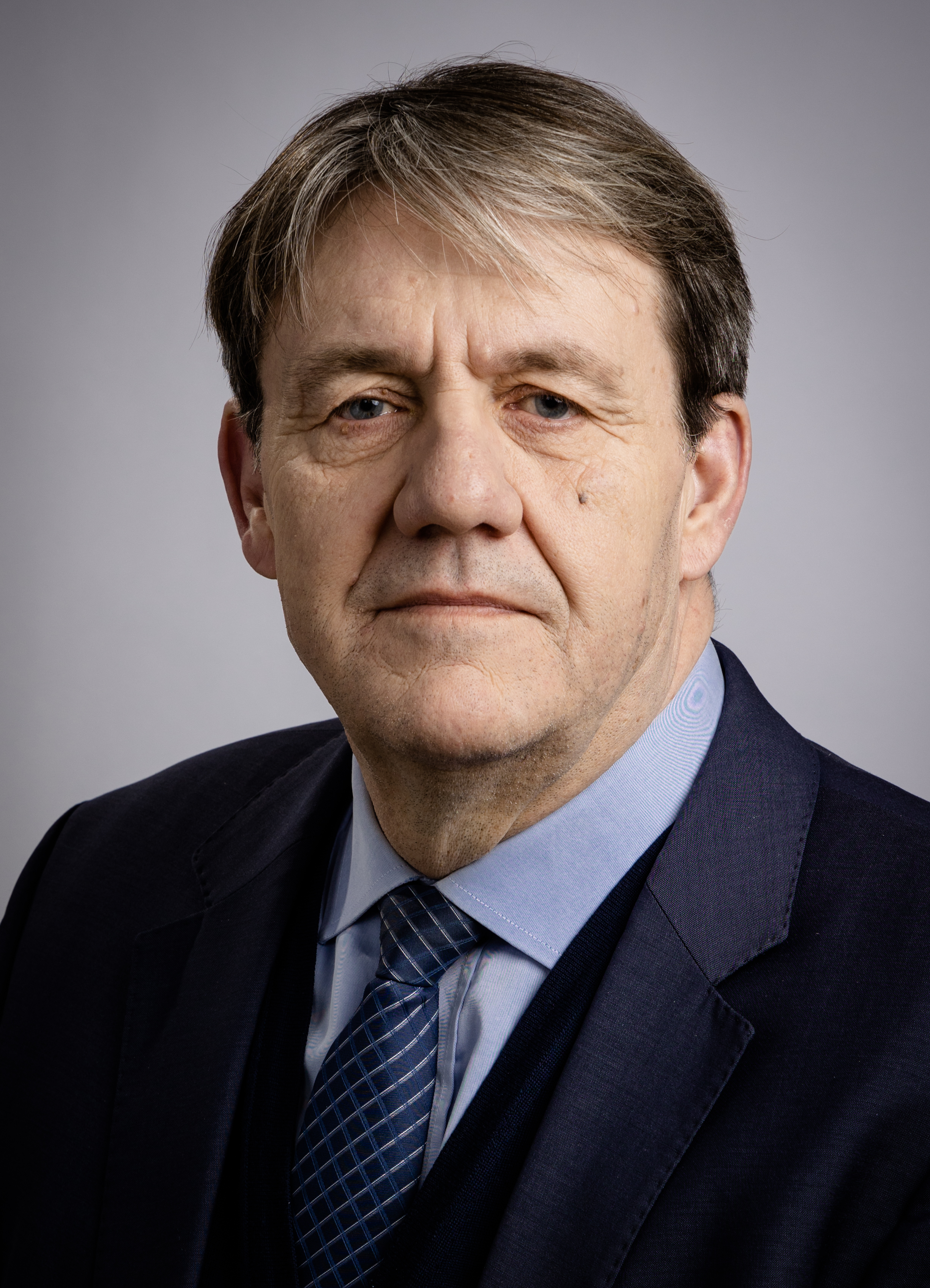

Personal details
- Born: 26 August 1960 (age 66) Sauðárkrókur, Iceland
- Party: Independence Party
- Spouse: Margrét Sveinsdóttir
- Children: 3
- Education: Suffolk University

Óli Björn Kárason (born 26 August 1960) is an Icelandic politician and former newspaper editor and reporter. He was the founder and first editor of Viðskiptablaðið. From 1999 to 2003 he served as the editor of Dagblaðið Vísir. After serving as a deputy member of parliament of parliament for the Independence Party from 2010 to 2016, he was voted as a full time member in the 2016 Icelandic parliamentary election.
