= Centre Party (Iceland) =

Centre Party Miðflokkurinn
- Chairperson: Sigmundur Davíð Gunnlaugsson
- Founder: Sigmundur Davíð Gunnlaugsson
- Founded: 24 September 2017
- Split from: Progressive Party
- Ideology: Agrarianism (Nordic); Conservatism; Hard Euroscepticism; Icelandic nationalism; Right-wing populism
- Political position: Right-wing
- European affiliation: European Conservatives and Reformists Party (global partner)
- Nordic affiliation: Centre Group
- Colours: Navy blue Neon green
- Seats in Parliament: 8 / 63

Election symbol

Website
- midflokkurinn.is

The Centre Party (Icelandic: Miðflokkurinn) is a Nordic agrarian and right-wing populist political party in Iceland, established in September 2017. It split from the Progressive Party due to leadership disputes, when two factions decided to band up as a new party before the 2017 Icelandic parliamentary election.

== Ideology ==
A self-proclaimed liberal and centrist party, the party is generally considered right-wing populist. The party is also described as agrarian and conservative, with some regarding it as holding nationally conservative, nationalist, protectionist and socially conservative positions.

The party proposes to reform the state's banking sector, maintaining government ownership of Landsbankinn, while reclaiming the state's stake in Arion Bank, which is controlled by hedge funds, and redistributing a third of its shares among Icelanders. It also plans to sell the government's existing stake in Íslandsbanki. The party supports scrapping indexation on debts and opposes the accession of Iceland to the European Union.

At the inaugural meeting of the party in Reykjavik on 8 October, the party's chairman and founder Sigmundur Davíð Gunnlaugsson stated that the party supported the best ideas of the left and right, emphasising both the protection of individual rights and social security, while also focusing on regional issues in the same vein of the Northern Powerhouse in the United Kingdom and improving benefits for the elderly. The party also proposes to improve ferry services and construct a new university hospital.

The party opposed the expansion of the abortion limit from the 16th week of the pregnancy to the 22nd week. Sigmundur Davíð opposed legislation to allow individuals to define their own gender in the eyes of the law but dropped the position in negotiation with other political parties. One of the party's members has called for teaching climate change denial views in public schools, he later left the party to join the Independence Party.

In 2021, Sigmundur Davíð called for the Icelandic government to take up the same asylum policy as that implemented by the Danish Social Democrats, that policy being to send asylum seekers to countries outside of Europe while their case is being processed. Sigmundur Davíð stated that the goal of this policy was to ensure that no one would come to the country seeking asylum using criminal networks in migrant smuggling.

== Supporters ==
According to a poll conducted by the Social Science Research Institute at the University of Iceland for Morgunblaðið in October 2017, the party drew nearly half its support from supporters of the Progressive Party in the 2016 Icelandic parliamentary election, with another quarter from the Independence Party, and 13% from the liberal Viðreisn and Bright Future. Sigmundur Davíð has traditionally attracted support due to his nationalist and populist views, though he did not express such views during the 2017 campaign.

== Controversy ==
In December 2018, a leaked recording captured four MPs of the Centre Party, including party leader Sigmundur Davíð, discussing women and a disabled woman in denigrating and sexually charged language. The scandal was known as the Klaustur Affair.

In October 2021, Birgir Þórarinsson, who was elected as a Centre Party candidate in elections the month before, announced that he was leaving the Centre Party and joining the Independence Party instead. Birgir cited the 2018 scandal as his reason for leaving the party. After Birgir's defection, the Centre Party was left with two members of the Althing.

== Election results ==
Election	Leader	Votes	%	Seats	+/–	Position	Government
2017	Sigmundur Davíð Gunnlaugsson	21,335	10.87	7 / 63	New	5th	Opposition
2021	Sigmundur Davíð Gunnlaugsson	10,879	5.45	3 / 63	▼4	▼8th	Opposition
2024	Sigmundur Davíð Gunnlaugsson	25,700	12.10	8 / 63	▲5	▲5th	Opposition

== Leaders ==
Chairperson	Took office	Left office
Sigmundur Davíð Gunnlaugsson (born 1975)	2017	Present
