= Páll Magnússon =

- Born: 17 June 1954 (age 71)
- Occupation: President of RÚV & news anchor

Páll Magnússon (born 17 June 1954) is the former director of RÚV, the National Icelandic Broadcasting Service. He has worked in the media for many years and was formerly executive news editor and president of Stöð 2. He was also one of Sjónvarpið's five news anchors.
