= Jón Þór Ólafsson =

Icelandic politician (born 1977)

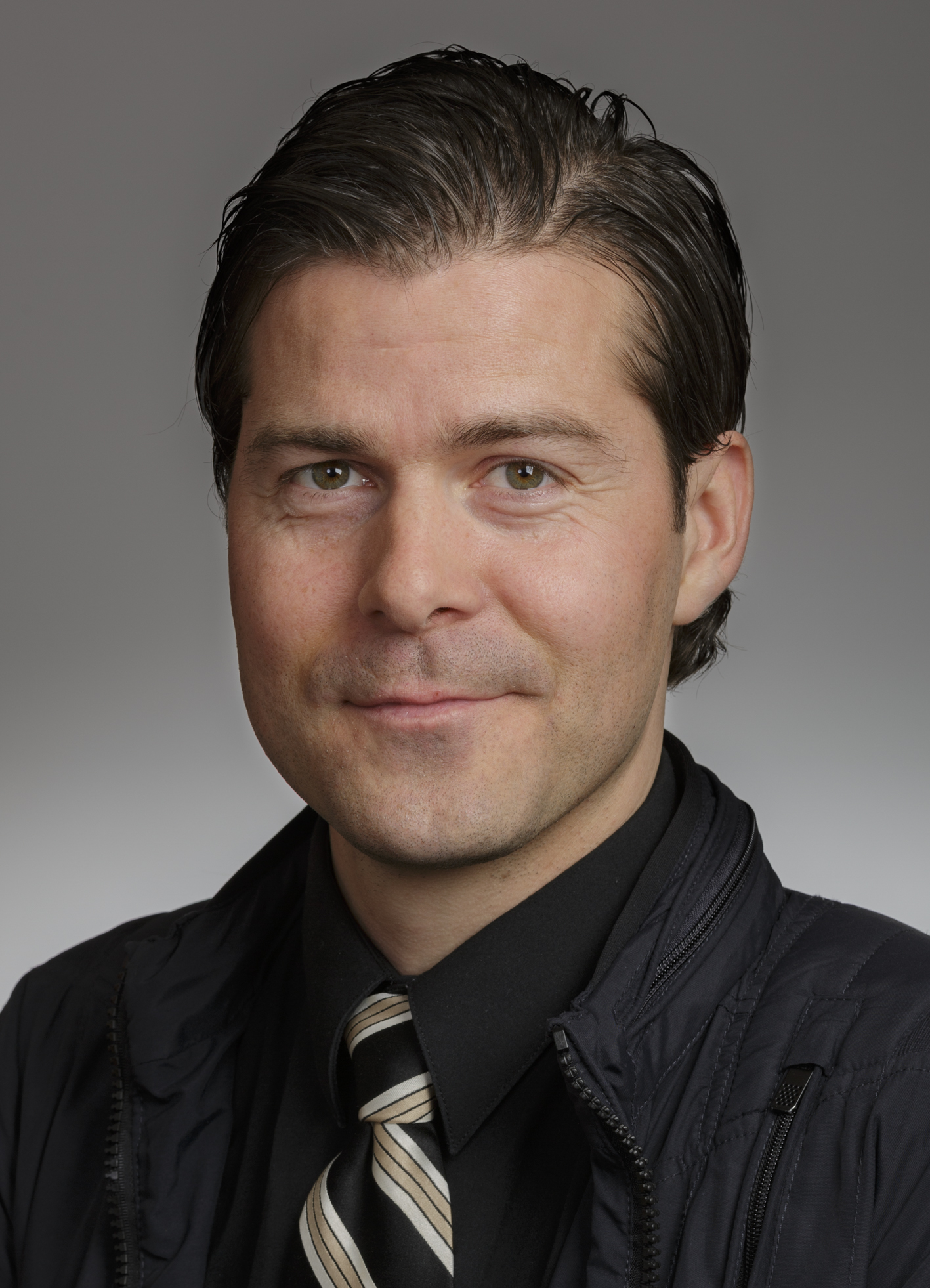
- Jón Þór Ólafsson

Member of the Althing
- Incumbent
- Assumed office First term: 27 April 2013 Second term: 29 October 2016 Third term: 28 Octobar 2017
- Constituency: Southwest Constituency
- In office 27 April 2013 – 25 September 2021 (Resigned 8 September 2015 and was reelected 29 October 2016)
- Succeeded by: Ásta Helgadóttir
- Constituency: Reykjavik Constituency South Reykjavik Constituency Southwest

Personal details
- Born: 13 March 1977 (age 49) Reykjavík, Iceland
- Party: Pirate Party
- Education: Studied philosophy, management and psychology at the University of Iceland. Deputy Speaker of Althingi 2013–2015 and 2016–2019. Chair of the Constitutional and Supervisory Committee 2020–2021 (2nd Deputy Chair 2017–2020).

Jón Þór Ólafsson (born 13 March 1977) is an Icelandic politician.

A business administration student at the University of Iceland, he was elected to the Althing in the 2013 Icelandic parliamentary election. He is a member of the Pirate Party Iceland.

He represented the Reykjavik Constituency South until he resigned in 2015, and was replaced by Ásta Helgadóttir. In 2016 he was again elected to the Althing.
