= Oddný G. Harðardóttir =

Icelandic politician (born 1957)

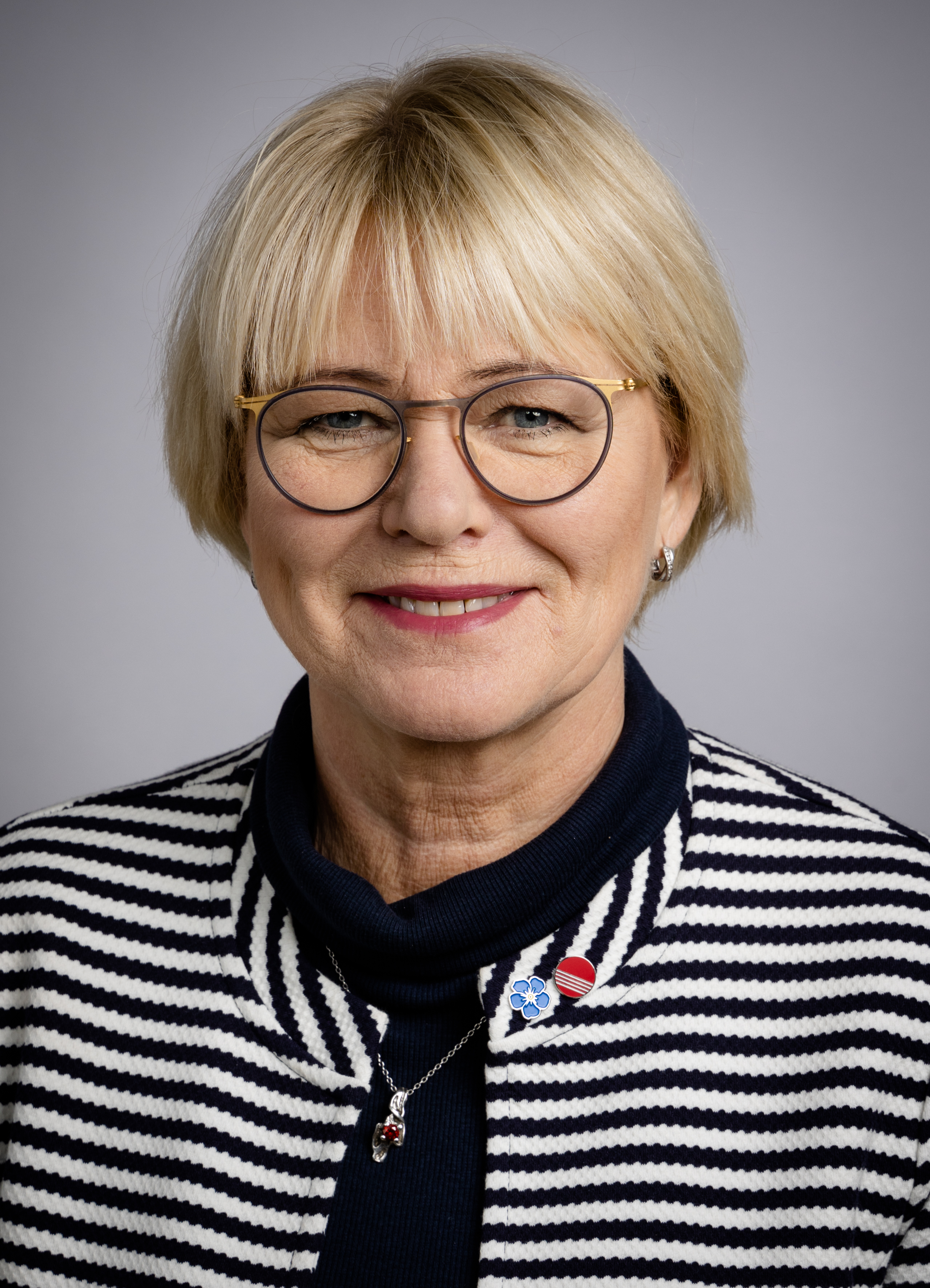
Oddný G Harðardóttir 2021

Oddný Guðbjörg Harðardóttir (born 9 April 1957 in Reykjavík) is an Icelandic politician representing the Social Democratic Alliance. She served as Minister of Finance from 2011 to 2012, and twice as parliamentary group leader for the SDA. On 17 March 2016, she declared her candidacy for the party's leadership election, which took place at an extraordinary party conference on 3–4 June, and she was elected party chairperson.

She resigned as party leader on 31 October 2016 after her party suffered their worst results in the 2016 election (falling to only three seats), and was replaced by deputy leader Logi Már Einarsson.
