= Ásmundur Friðriksson =

Icelandic writer and politician

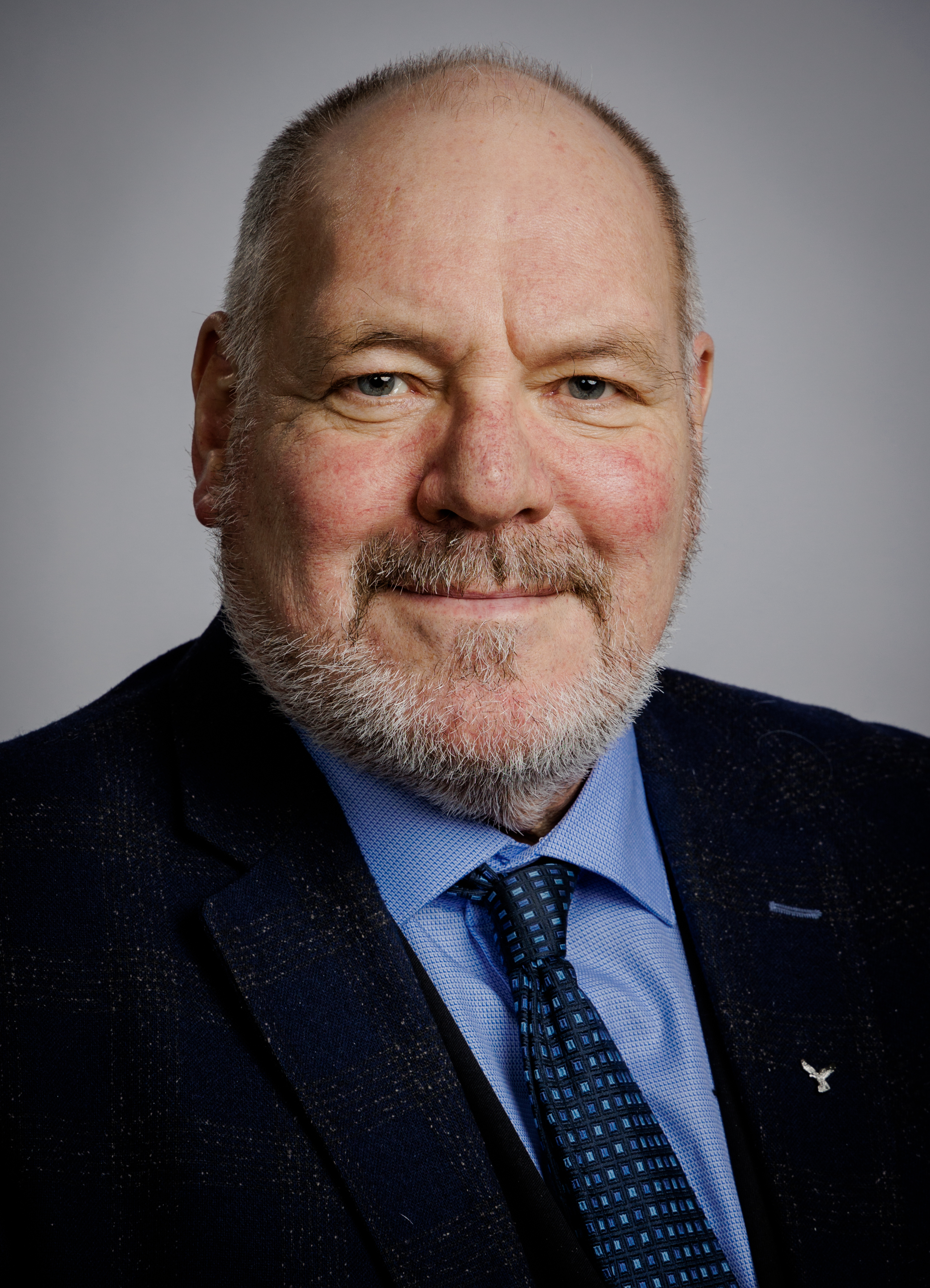

Personal details
- Born: 21 January 1956 (age 69); Reykjavík, Iceland
- Political party: Independence Party

Ásmundur Friðriksson (born 21 January 1956) is an Icelandic politician. He has been a member of Alþingi for the Independence Party since 2013.
