= Viðreisn =

Liberal Reform Party Viðreisn
- Chairperson: Þorgerður Katrín Gunnarsdóttir
- Vice-chairperson: Daði Már Kristófersson
- Founded: 24 May 2016
- Split from: Independence Party
- Headquarters: Reykjavík, Iceland
- Youth wing: Uppreisn
- Ideology: Liberalism; Economic liberalism; Green liberalism; Pro-Europeanism
- Political position: Centre to centre-right
- European affiliation: Alliance of Liberals and Democrats for Europe Party
- Nordic affiliation: Centre Group
- Colours: Orange
- Seats in Parliament: 11 / 63

Election symbol
- C

Website
- www.vidreisn.is

Viðreisn (lit. 'Revival', 'Reform', or 'Regeneration'), officially known in English as the Liberal Reform Party, is a liberal political party in Iceland positioned on the centre to centre-right of the political spectrum. The party was founded as such on 24 May 2016, but it had existed as a political network since June 2014. It split from the Independence Party, mainly over discontent with its decision to not hold a referendum on joining the European Union and the lack of support for free trade.

The party supports Icelandic EU membership, and reform of agricultural subsidies and protective excise taxes on foreign produce. Viðreisn is in favor of a publicly financed welfare state. It supports pegging the króna to another currency, such as the euro, through a currency board as a plan to lower interest rates. Its healthcare policy aims at reducing the patient's share of healthcare costs.

Viðreisn has been assigned the list letter C. It participated in the 2016 elections to the Althing (Icelandic parliament) and won seven of the 63 seats.

In 2019 Viðreisn became a member of the Alliance of Liberals and Democrats for Europe Party (ALDE).

== Election results ==
Election	Leader	Votes	%	Seats	+/–	Position	Government
2016	Benedikt Jóhannesson	19,870	10.48	7 / 63	New	5th	Coalition
2017	Þorgerður Katrín Gunnarsdóttir	13,122	6.69	4 / 63	▼3	▼8th	Opposition
2021	Þorgerður Katrín Gunnarsdóttir	16,628	8.33	5 / 63	▲1	▲7th	Opposition
2024	Þorgerður Katrín Gunnarsdóttir	33,606	15.82	11 / 63	▲6	▲3rd	Coalition

== Party chairperson ==
Chairperson	Period
Benedikt Jóhannesson (born 1955)	2016–2017
Þorgerður Katrín Gunnarsdóttir (born 1965)	2017–
