= 2016 Icelandic parliamentary election =

- 29 October 2016
- All 63 seats in the Althing; 32 seats needed for a majority
- Turnout: 79.18%
Party	Leader	Vote %	Seats	+/–
Independence	Bjarni Benediktsson	29.00	21	+2
Left-Green	Katrín Jakobsdóttir	15.91	10	+3
Pirates	Collective leadership (Note: The Pirate Party rejects the regular leadership model. Their formal chairperson of the parliamentary group in 2016 was Birgitta Jónsdóttir.)	14.48	10	+7
Progressive	Sigurður Ingi Jóhannsson	11.49	8	−11
Viðreisn	Benedikt Jóhannesson	10.48	7	New
Bright Future	Óttarr Proppé	7.16	4	−2
Social Democratic	Oddný G. Harðardóttir	5.74	3	−6
This lists parties that won seats. See the complete results below.
Results by constituency
Prime Minister before	Prime Minister after election
Sigurður Ingi Jóhannsson; Progressive	Bjarni Benediktsson; Independence

Parliamentary elections were held in Iceland on 29 October 2016. They were due to be held on or before 27 April 2017, but following the 2016 Icelandic anti-government protests, the ruling coalition announced that early elections would be held "in autumn".

The Independence Party emerged as the largest in the Althing, winning 21 of the 63 seats; the Progressive Party, which had won the most seats in 2013, lost more than half its seats as it was overtaken by the Left-Green Movement and the Pirate Party. Of the 63 elected MPs, 30 were female, giving Iceland the highest proportion of female MPs in Europe.

A new coalition was formed on 10 January 2017, consisting of the Independence Party, Viðreisn and Bright Future, with Bjarni Benediktsson becoming prime minister on 11 January 2017.

== Background ==
In early April 2016, following revelations in the Panama Papers, leaks from law firm Mossack Fonseca about the financial dealings of then Prime Minister Sigmundur Davíð Gunnlaugsson (Progressive Party) and his wife, there were calls for an early election from the opposition, who planned to present him with a motion of no confidence. Mass protests calling on the Prime Minister to quit followed. Although Sigmundur Davíð had stated he had no intention of resigning, he apparently resigned on 5 April. However, it was later stated by the Prime Minister's office that he had only taken a temporary leave of absence from his duties. The Progressive Party's deputy leader, Sigurður Ingi Jóhannsson, became acting prime minister the same day.

The president, Olafur Ragnar Grimsson, then said he would speak to both coalition parties, Progressive Party and Independence Party, before considering whether to call new elections. Opposition parties continued to press for new elections. On 6 April, Sigurður announced, "We expect to have elections this autumn." On 11 August, Bjarni Benediktsson met with opposition parties and later announced that elections would be held on 29 October 2016.

== Electoral system ==
The 63 members of the Althing were elected using open list proportional representation in multi-member constituencies of 10 to 11 seats. Of the 63 seats, 54 were elected using constituency results and determined using the d'Hondt method. The remaining nine supplementary seats were awarded to parties that crossed the 5% national electoral threshold in order to give them a total number of seats equivalent to their national share of the vote.

== Participating parties ==
The final deadline for parties to apply for participation in the parliamentary election was 14 October 2016.

Parties with a list for all constituencies

- Bright Future, list letter A
- Progressive Party, list letter B
- Viðreisn, list letter C
- Independence Party, list letter D
- People's Party, list letter F
- Social Democratic Alliance, list letter S
- Dawn, list letter T
- Left-Green Movement, list letter V
- Pirate Party, list letter P

Parties with a list for only some constituencies

- Humanist Party in Reykjavík South, list letter H
- People's Front of Iceland in all constituencies apart from the Northwest, list letter R
- Icelandic National Front in the South and Northwest constituencies, list letter E

== Campaign ==
Sigurður Ingi replaced Sigmundur Davíð as the party chairman of the Progressive Party on 2 October 2016.

The Pirate Party announced on 16 October 2016 that they would not participate in post-election negotiations to form a coalition government with either the Progressive Party or the Independence Party. The party did send letters to Reform, Bright Future, Social Democratic Alliance and Left-Green Movement about the possibility of forming an alliance prior to the election.

== Opinion polls ==
Graphical summary of the opinion polls in Iceland since the previous parliamentary election. Each dot corresponds to one poll's number for party. A smoothing spline is used to show the trends. The scatter of points around the spline curves gives an indication of the uncertainty of the polls. The thin circles at the very right show the results of the election, which for P and D deviate significantly from the polls.

Institute	Release date	V	S	P	A	B	D	C	Others	Lead
Gallup	28 Oct 2016	16.5%	7.4%	17.9%	6.8%	9.3%	27.0%	8.8%		9.1%
MMR	28 Oct 2016	16.2%	6.1%	20.5%	6.7%	11.4%	24.7%	8.9%	5.5%	4.2%
Háskóli Íslands	27 Oct 2016	16.8%	5.7%	21.2%	6.7%	10.1%	22.5%	11.4%	5.5%	1.3%
Fréttablaðið / Stöð 2 / Vísir	27 Oct 2016	16.4%	5.7%	18.4%	6.3%	9.9%	27.3%	10.5%	5.5%	8.9%
MMR	26 Oct 2016	16.0%	7.6%	19.1%	8.8%	10.0%	21.9%	9.3%	7.3%	2.8%
Fréttablaðið / Stöð 2 / Vísir	26 Oct 2016	16.4%	6.0%	20.3%	5.1%	11.2%	25.1%	10.8%	5.1%	4.8%
Háskóli Íslands	21 Oct 2016	18.6%	6.5%	22.6%	6.0%	9.1%	21.1%	8.8%	7.3%	1.5%
Fréttablaðið / Stöð 2 / Vísir	18 Oct 2016	19.2%	6.5%	20.7%	7.4%	8.5%	23.7%	6.6%	7.4%	3.0%
MMR	14 Oct 2016	14.5%	9.0%	19.6%	8.2%	9.2%	21.4%	10.2%	7.9%	1.8%
Háskóli Íslands	14 Oct 2016	17.7%	6.9%	17.5%	7.7%	8.6%	21.5%	11.4%	8.7%	4.0%
Gallup	14 Oct 2016	14.5%	7.1%	18.3%	7.7%	9.8%	22.6%	12.4%	7.6%	4.3%
Fréttablaðið / Stöð 2 / Vísir	12 Oct 2016	15.1%	7.3%	22.8%	8.2%	8.5%	22.7%	8.4%	7.0%	0.1%
Fréttablaðið / Stöð 2 / Vísir	5 Oct 2016	12.6%	8.8%	19.2%	6.9%	11.4%	25.9%	6.9%	8.3%	6.7%
Gallup	30 Sep 2016	15.6%	8.5%	20.6%	4.7%	8.2%	23.7%	13.4%	5.4%	3.1%
Fréttablaðið / Stöð 2 / Vísir	28 Sep 2016	12.9%	5.9%	19.9%	3.6%	12.6%	34.6%	7.3%	3.2%	14.7%
MMR	26 Sep 2016	11.5%	9.3%	21.6%	4.9%	12.2%	20.6%	12.3%	6.7%	1.0%
MMR	22 Sep 2016	13.2%	8.1%	22.7%	4.1%	11.0%	22.7%	11.5%	6.7%	Tied
Gallup	16 Sep 2016	13.5%	8.8%	23.1%	2.9%	9.4%	25.5%	12.2%	4.6%	1.4%
Fréttablaðið / Stöð 2 / Vísir	8 Sep 2016	12.7%	7.5%	29.5%	2.0%	10.7%	28.2%	6.7%	2.7%	1.3%
Gallup	6 Sep 2016	16.2%	8.3%	25.8%	2.9%	9.0%	26.3%	10.6%	0.9%	0.5%
MMR	30 Aug 2016	12.4%	9.1%	22.4%	4.5%	10.6%	24.6%	8.8%	7.6%	2.2%
Gallup	29 Jul 2016	16.8%	8.0%	25.3%	4.2%	9.9%	26.2%	9.0%	0.6%	0.9%
MMR	25 Jul 2016	12.9%	8.4%	26.8%	3.9%	8.3%	24.0%	9.4%	6.3%	2.8%
MMR	7 Jul 2016	18.0%	10.9%	24.3%	2.9%	6.4%	25.3%	6.7%	5.4%	1.0%
Gallup	29 Jun 2016	15.2%	8.2%	27.9%	3.4%	10.0%	25.1%	9.4%	0.8%	2.8%
Háskóli Íslands	24 Jun 2016	17.0%	9.0%	28.0%	4.5%	9.5%	19.7%	9.7%	2.6%	8.3%
Háskóli Íslands	14 Jun 2016	15.9%	7.6%	29.9%	2.9%	11.1%	22.7%	9.1%	0.8%	7.2%
Háskóli Íslands	4 Jun 2016	16.5%	7.2%	28.3%	3.8%	11.8%	23.9%	7.9%	0.6%	4.4%
Gallup	1 Jun 2016	16.8%	7.7%	27.4%	4.0%	10.2%	28.5%	4.3%	1.1%	1.1%
Fréttablaðið / Stöð 2 / Vísir	27 May 2016	18.1%	6.1%	28.7%	2.5%	7.3%	31.5%		5.8%	2.8%
Háskóli Íslands	17 May 2016	18.9%	8.9%	25.8%	4.8%	8.2%	28.2%	3.5%	1.7%	2.4%
MMR	13 May 2016	15.8%	7.5%	31.0%	4.9%	10.4%	26.3%		2.5%	4.7%
Fréttablaðið	12 May 2016	19.8%	7.4%	30.3%	3.1%	6.5%	31.1%		1.8%	0.8%
Fréttablaðið	6 May 2016	14.0%	8.4%	31.8%	4.0%	8.3%	29.9%		3.6%	1.9%
MMR	3 May 2016	14.0%	9.7%	28.9%	3.4%	11.2%	27.8%		5.0%	1.1%
Gallup	30 Apr 2016	18.4%	8.3%	26.6%	5.2%	10.5%	27.0%	3.5%	0.5%	0.4%
Gallup	13 Apr 2016	19.8%	9.0%	29.3%	5.0%	6.9%	26.7%	2.7%	0.6%	2.6%
Háskóli Íslands	8 Apr 2016	14.7%	9.5%	30.9%	4.8%	12.9%	23.3%		3.9%	7.6%
Maskína	8 Apr 2016	20.0%	7.2%	34.2%	5.2%	9.4%	21.3%		2.7%	12.9%
Gallup	7 Apr 2016	16.7%	7.6%	32.4%	5.6%	10.8%	21.9%	3.3%	1.7%	11.5%
MMR	6 Apr 2016	12.8%	9.9%	36.7%	5.8%	8.7%	22.5%		3.6%	12.2%
Fréttablaðið	5 Apr 2016	11.2%	10.2%	43.0%	3.8%	7.9%	21.6%		2.3%	21.4%
Háskóli Íslands	5 Apr 2016	14.9%	8.1%	39.4%	4.4%	10.0%	18.8%		4.4%	20.6%
Gallup	31 Mar 2016	11.0%	9.5%	36.1%	3.2%	12.0%	23.2%	2.1%	2.9%	12.9%
MMR	18 Mar 2016	9.3%	9.2%	38.3%	4.2%	12.4%	22.9%		3.4%	15.4%
Fréttablaðið	9 Mar 2016	8.4%	8.2%	38.1%	1.8%	12.8%	27.6%		3.1%	10.5%
MMR	2 Mar 2016	7.8%	7.8%	37.0%	4.2%	12.8%	23.4%		7%	13.6%
Gallup	2 Mar 2016	10.8%	9.7%	35.9%	3.3%	11.0%	23.7%		5.6%	12.2%
Gallup	2 Feb 2016	10.8%	9.2%	35.3%	3.6%	12.0%	24.4%		4.7%	10.9%
MMR	2 Feb 2016	11.0%	9.4%	35.6%	4.4%	12.2%	21.1%		5.9%	14.5%
Fréttablaðið	30 Jan 2016	9.6%	9.9%	41.8%	1.6%	10.2%	23.2%		3.7%	18.6%
Gallup	2 Jan 2016	10.2%	10.4%	33.1%	4.2%	12.0%	25.2%		4.9%	7.9%
MMR	18 Dec 2015	11.4%	12.9%	34.9%	5.3%	11.5%	20.6%		3.4%	14.3%
Gallup	4 Dec 2015	11.4%	10.1%	32.9%	3.9%	12.0%	24.8%		4.9%	8.1%
MMR	16 Nov 2015	9.9%	10.5%	35.3%	4.6%	10.8%	23.7%		5.2%	11.6%
Gallup	4 Nov 2015	11.1%	10.6%	35.5%	4.6%	9.6%	24.6%		4.4%	0.9%
MMR	21 Oct 2015	11.8%	11.3%	34.2%	6.5%	10.4%	21.7%		4.1%	12.5%
Gallup	2 Oct 2015	10.6%	10.1%	34.6%	5.6%	10.1%	24.4%		4.6%	10.2%
MMR	3 Sep 2015	9.6%	10.6%	33.0%	5.8%	11.4%	25.3%		4.3%	7.7%
Gallup	1 Sep 2015	11.8%	9.3%	35.9%	4.4%	11.1%	21.7%		5.8%	14.2%
Gallup	7 Aug 2015	8.9%	12.2%	32.3%	5.0%	12.4%	24.0%		5.2%	8.3%
MMR	4 Aug 2015	10.2%	9.6%	35.0%	4.4%	12.2%	23.1%		5.5%	7.9%
MMR	30 Jun 2015	12.0%	9.3%	33.2%	5.6%	10.6%	23.8%		5.5%	9.4%
Rúv	29 Jun 2015	10.3%	11.4%	32.0%	6.4%	11.3%	24.5%		4.1%	7.5%
MMR	25 Jun 2015	10.5%	11.6%	32.4%	6.8%	10.0%	23.3%		5.4%	9.1%
FBL	19 Jun 2015	7.3%	11.1%	37.5%	3.3%	8.5%	29.5%		2.8%	8.0%
MMR	16 Jun 2015	11.1%	11.8%	34.5%	6.7%	11.3%	21.2%		3.5%	13.3%
Gallup	1 Jun 2015	9.8%	12.4%	34.1%	7.4%	8.9%	23.0%		4.3%	11.1%
MMR	26 May 2015	10.4%	13.1%	32.7%	6.3%	8.6%	23.1%		5.6%	9.6%
MMR	4 May 2015	10.8%	10.7%	32.0%	8.3%	10.8%	21.9%		5.5%	10.1%
Gallup	30 Apr 2015	10.6%	14.1%	30.1%	7.8%	10.1%	22.9%		4.4%	9.2%
Gallup	30 Mar 2015	10.1%	15.8%	21.7%	10.9%	10.8%	25.0%		5.7%	3.3%
Kjarninn	26 Mar 2015	10.2%	16.1%	23.6%	10.1%	11.0%	24.8%		4.2%	1.2%
MMR	21 Mar 2015	9.0%	16.3%	29.1%	9.0%	11.6%	23.4%		1.7%	5.7%
MMR	18 Mar 2015	10.8%	15.5%	23.9%	10.3%	11.0%	23.4%		5.1%	0.5%
Fréttablaðið	11 Mar 2015	10.4%	16.1%	21.9%	9.2%	10.1%	28.0%		4.3%	6.1%
Rúv	2 Mar 2015	11.2%	17.1%	15.2%	13.3%	11.0%	26.1%		6.1%	9.0%
MMR	19 Feb 2015	12.9%	14.5%	12.8%	15.0%	13.1%	25.5%		6.2%	10.5%
Gallup	3 Feb 2015	11.0%	18.0%	12.0%	13.0%	13.0%	27.0%		6.0%	9.0%
MMR	14 Jan 2015	11.9%	15.9%	12.8%	16.9%	9.4%	27.3%		5.8%	10.4%
Mbl	16 Dec 2014	11.6%	16.1%	11.4%	16.2%	11.0%	29.0%		4.7%	12.8%
Fréttablaðið	17 Nov 2014	13.1%	19.2%	9.2%	12.5%	12.8%	32.9%			13.7%
MMR	4 Nov 2014	10.7%	16.1%	11.3%	18.6%	12.3%	23.6%		7.4%	5.0%
Gallup	3 Oct 2014	13.0%	19.0%	7.0%	16.0%	12.0%	27.0%			8.0%
MMR	8 Sep 2014	10.4%	16.9%	9.2%	17.8%	11.3%	28.2%		6.2%	10.4%
MMR	28 Aug 2014	9.6%	20.3%	10.3%	17.6%	9.6%	26.6%		6.0%	6.3%
MMR	31 Jul 2014	11.6%	17.0%	9.6%	19.2%	11.8%	24.1%		6.7%	7.1%
MMR	24 Jun 2014	11.4%	16.5%	8.3%	21.8%	11.4%	25.0%		5.6%	3.2%
MMR	13 May 2014	11.6%	16.4%	9.6%	19.4%	12.3%	22.1%		8.6%	2.7%
MMR	2 May 2014	11.7%	17.4%	9.0%	15.5%	14.1%	25.1%		7.2%	7.7%
MMR	14 Apr 2014	11.5%	15.1%	11.0%	17.1%	14.4%	23.9%		7.0%	6.8%
MMR	3 Mar 2014	10.4%	14.0%	9.3%	16.4%	14.6%	29.0%		5.6%	12.6%
RÚV	27 Feb 2014	13.0%	16.8%	9.8%	15.8%	15.3%	23.7%		5.6%	6.9%
Capacent	1 Feb 2014	12.7%	14.9%	8.1%	14.2%	18.3%	26.9%			8.6%
MMR	22 Jan 2014	11.0%	17.1%	6.9%	15.9%	17.0%	26.3%		5.6%	9.2%
Capacent	24 Dec 2013	13.3%	15.1%	10.7%	13.1%	16.4%	25.3%			8.9%
MMR	30 Nov 2013	12.6%	13.8%	9.0%	15.2%	15.0%	26.8%			11.6%
2013 result	28 Apr 2013	10.9%	12.9%	5.1%	8.3%	24.4%	26.7%			2.3%
Institute	Release date	V	S	P	A	B	D	C	Others	Lead

== Results ==
Voter turnout was the lowest turnout in Iceland's history.

Party	Votes	%	Seats	+/–
Independence Party	54,992	29.00	21	+2
Left-Green Movement	30,167	15.91	10	+3
Pirate Party	27,466	14.48	10	+7
Progressive Party	21,792	11.49	8	–11
Viðreisn	19,870	10.48	7	New
Bright Future	13,578	7.16	4	–2
Social Democratic Alliance	10,894	5.74	3	–6
People's Party	6,707	3.54	0	New
Dawn	3,275	1.73	0	0
People's Front of Iceland	571	0.30	0	0
Icelandic National Front	303	0.16	0	New
Humanist Party	33	0.02	0	0
Total	189,648	100.00	63	0
Valid votes	189,648	97.16		
Invalid/blank votes	5,552	2.84		
Total votes	195,200	100.00		
Registered voters/turnout	246,542	79.18		
Source: Statistics Iceland

== Government formation ==
Neither of the two main blocs — the outgoing coalition of the Independence Party and the Progressives, or the centre-left opposition (Left-Greens, Pirates, Bright Future and Social Democrats) — secured an overall majority, leaving the new centrist party Reform as possible kingmakers.

The leader of the Independence Party, Bjarni Benediktsson, expressed preference for a three-party coalition, although without saying which three parties. The Pirate Party proposed a five-party coalition with the Left-Green Movement, the Social Democrats, Bright Future and Reform, having previously ruled out working with either of the two outgoing coalition members. The Pirate Party then suggested a minority coalition of Left-Green Movement, Bright Future and Reform, with outside support from themselves and the Social Democrats, in order to simplify the process of government formation.

The leader of Reform ruled out a right-leaning three-party coalition with the Independence Party and the Progressives, and did not rule out supporting the centre-left bloc.

On 2 November, President Guðni Th. Jóhannesson gave the mandate to Bjarni to form a majority government. On 11 November, the Independence Party, Reform and Bright Future entered into formal coalition talks, but the three parties failed to agree with a new market-based fishing quota system and an EU referendum as the main stumbling blocks.

On 17 November, the mandate to form a majority government was in turn given to the leader of the Left-Greens, Katrín Jakobsdóttir. She instigated talks with Reform, Bright Future, the Pirates, and Social Democrats, and on 19 November the five parties agreed to start formal coalition talks. On 24 November, the coalition talks fell through and Katrín formally renounced the Presidential mandate to form a government.

On 2 December, the mandate to form a majority government was given to the leader of the Pirate Party, Birgitta Jónsdóttir. The Pirates were unable to form a government and the President chose not to give a new mandate to form a government, but asked the party leaders to discuss the matter informally.

On 2 January 2017, the Independence Party started official talks about a possible coalition deal with Viðreisn and Bright Future. Morgunblaðið also reported that the Left-Green Movement and the Progressive Party had also discussed possible coalition deals with the Independence Party. A new coalition was formed on 10 January 2017 between Independence Party, Viðreisn and the Bright Future with Bjarni Benediktsson becoming prime minister on 11 January 2017.
