= List of members of the Althing, 2013–2016 =

This is a list of the 63 members of the Icelandic Parliament (Althing), from 2013 until 2016.

== Election results ==
| National party | Chairperson(s) | Seats | ± 2009 |
|---|---|---|---|
| Independence Party | Bjarni Benediktsson, Jr. | 19 / 63 | ▲3 |
| Progressive Party | Sigmundur Gunnlaugsson | 19 / 63 | ▲10 |
| Social Democratic Alliance | Árni Árnason | 9 / 63 | ▼11 |
| Left-Green Movement | Katrín Jakobsdóttir | 7 / 63 | ▼7 |
| Bright Future (Iceland) | Guðmundur Steingrímsson | 6 / 63 | new |
| Pirate Party | Collective leadership | 3 / 63 | new |

== List of chosen MPs ==
Members of the Althing elected on 27 April 2013
| Reykjavik North | Reykjavik South | Southwest | Northwest | Northeast | South |
|---|---|---|---|---|---|
| 1. Illugi Gunnarsson (D); 2. Frosti Sigurjónsson (B); 3. Katrín Jakobsdóttir (V); 4. Össur Skarphéðinsson (S); 5. Brynjar Þór Níelsson (D); 6. Björt Ólafsdóttir (A); 7. Sigrún Magnúsdóttir (B); 8. Árni Þór Sigurðsson (V); 9. Birgir Ármannsson (D); L1. Helgi Hrafn Gunnarsson (Þ); L7. Valgerður Bjarnadóttir (S) | 1. Hanna B. Kristjánsdóttir (D); 2. Vigdís Hauksdóttir (B); 3. Sigríður I. Ingadóttir (S); 4. Pétur H. Blöndal (D); 5. Svandís Svavarsdóttir (V); 6. Róbert Marshall (A); 7. Guðlaugur Þór Þórðarson (D); 8. Karl Garðarsson (B); 9. Helgi Hjörvar (S); L2. Ásta Guðrún Helgadóttir (Þ); L5. Óttarr Proppé (A) | 1. Bjarni Benediktsson (D); 2. Eygló Harðardóttir (B); 3. Ragnheiður Ríkharðsdóttir (D); 4. Árni Páll Árnason (S); 5. Willum Þór Þórsson (B); 6. Jón Gunnarsson (D); 7. Guðmundur Steingrímsson (A); 8. Ögmundur Jónasson (V); 9. Vilhjálmur Bjarnason (D); 10.Þorsteinn Sæmundsson (B); 11.Katrín Júlíusdóttir (S); L4. Birgitta Jónsdóttir (Þ); L8. Elín Hirst (D) | 1. Gunnar Bragi Sveinsson (B); 2. Einar K. Guðfinnsson (D); 3. Ásmundur Einar Daðason (B); 4. Haraldur Benediktsson (D); 5. Guðbjartur Hannesson (S); 6. Elsa Lára Arnardóttir (B); 7. Jóhanna M. Sigmundsdóttir (B); L6. Lilja R. Magnúsdóttir (V) | 1. Sigmundur D. Gunnlaugsson (B); 2. Kristján Þór Júlíusson (D); 3. Höskuldur Þór Þórhallsson (B); 4. Steingrímur J. Sigfússon (V); 5. Líneik Anna Sævarsdóttir (B); 6. Valgerður Gunnarsdóttir (D); 7. Kristján L. Möller (S); 8. Þórunn Egilsdóttir (B); 9. Bjarkey Gunnarsdóttir (V); L3. Brynhildur Pétursdóttir (A) | 1. Sigurður I. Jóhannsson (B); 2. Ragnheiður E. Árnadóttir (D); 3. Silja Dögg Gunnarsdóttir (B); 4. Unnur Brá Konráðsdóttir (D); 5. Páll Jóhann Pálsson (B); 6. Oddný G. Harðardóttir (S); 7. Ásmundur Friðriksson (D); 8. Haraldur Einarsson (B); 9. Vilhjálmur Árnason (D); L9. Páll Valur Björnsson (A) |
Key: D = Independence Party; B = Progressive Party; S = Social Democratic Alliance; V = Left-Green Movement; A = Bright Future; Þ = Pirate Party; L1-L9 = Leveling seats nr.1-9. Source: Morgunblaðið and Landskjörstjórn (The National Electoral Commission)

For the parties having qualified with a national result above the 5% election threshold, the 9 leveling seats (L1-L9) were first distributed party-wise according to the calculation method in this particular order (where the party's total number of national votes was divided by the sum of "won seats plus 1" - with an extra leveling seat granted to the party with the highest fraction - while repeating this process until all 9 leveling seats had been determined). At the next step, these leveling seats were then by the same order distributed one by one to the relative strongest constituency of the seat winning party (while disregarding the constituencies that already ran out of vacant leveling seats). At the third step, the specific leveling seat is finally granted to the party's highest ranked runner-up candidate within the constituency, according to the same accumulated candidate vote score as being used when apportioning the constituency seats.

The table below display how the leveling seats were apportioned, and the "relative constituency strength" figures for each party, which is measured for each constituency as the "party vote share" divided by "won constituency seats of the party +1". To illustrate how the selection method works, each party in a constituency being apportioned a leveling seat, have got their figure for relative strength (vote share per seat) bolded in the table, with a parenthesis noting the number of the leveling seat. Because constituencies run out of available leveling seats one by one as the calculation progress, it can sometimes happen that the constituency with the highest relative strength needs to be disregarded. In example, if there had been no restrictions to the available number of leveling seats in a constituency, then the table below would have distributed the Independence Party's L8-seat to its relative strongest Northwest Constituency with an 8.22% vote share per seat; But as the one and only leveling seat of this constituency had already been granted to the Left-Green party (who won the L6-seat), then the L8-seat instead had to be granted to a relatively weaker constituency, which to be more exact ended only being the fourth strongest constituency for the Independence Party - namely the Southwest constituency with a 6.14% vote share per seat.

| Candidates selected for the 9 leveling seats (L1-L9 are first apportioned at national level to parties, then to the relative strongest constituency of the party, and finally given to its highest ranked runner-up candidate) | Leveling seats won by party | Reykjavik North (party vote share divided by won local seats +1) | Reykjavik South (party vote share divided by won local seats +1) | Southwest (party vote share divided by won local seats +1) | Northwest (party vote share divided by won local seats +1) | Northeast (party vote share divided by won local seats +1) | South (party vote share divided by won local seats +1) |
|---|---|---|---|---|---|---|---|
| Independence Party (D) | L8 | 5.84% 4.67% (Note: Party vote share divided by "won constituency seats +2", has also been calculated for constituencies with two leveling seats (as each party in theory has a chance to win both of them).) | 6.70% 5.36% | **6.14% (L8)**; 5.12% | 8.22% | 7.52% | 5.65% |
| Progressive Party (B) | | 5.48% 4.11% | 5.60% 4.20% | 5.38% 4.31% | 7.03% | 6.92% | 6.89% |
| Social Democratic Alliance (S) | L7 | **7.13% (L7)**; 4.75% | 4.73% 3.55% | 4.55% 3.41% | 6.11% | 5.30% | 5.09% |
| Left-Green Movement (V) | L6 | 5.22% 3.92% | 6.06% 4.04% | 3.93% 2.62% | **8.47% (L6)** | 5.27% | 5.88% |
| Bright Future (A) | L3+L5+L9 | 5.10% 3.40% | **5.37% (L5)**; 3.58% | 4.61% 3.07% | 4.56% | **6.51% (L3)** | **4.47% (L9)** |
| Pirate Party (Þ) | L1+L2+L4 | **6.87% (L1)**; 3.43% | **6.17% (L2)**; 3.09% | **5.00% (L4)**; 2.50% | 3.09% | 3.03% | 4.72% |
