= Welfare Committee (Iceland) =

Standing committee of the Icelandic parliament

The Welfare Committee (Icelandic: Velferðarnefnd) is a standing committee of the Icelandic parliament.

== Jurisdiction ==
According to law № 55/1991, with later amendments, all matters relating to the following subjects are referred to the Welfare Committee:

- Health insurance
- Social security
- Social services
- Children
- Senior citizens
- Disability
- Housing
- Labour market
- Health care

== Members, 140th parliament ==
The main members have seats in the committees and attend the meetings. When they are unable to do so the substitute members temporarily take their place.

=== Main ===
Name	Party
Álfheiður Ingadóttir, chairman	Left-Green Movement
Eygló Harðardóttir	Progressive Party
Guðmundur Steingrímsson	independent
Jónína Rós Guðmundsdóttir, 1st vice-chairman	Social Democratic Alliance
Kristján L. Möller	Social Democratic Alliance
Lúðvík Geirsson, 2nd vice-chairman	Social Democratic Alliance
Ragnheiður Ríkharðsdóttir	Independence Party
Unnur Brá Konráðsdóttir	Independence Party
Valgerður Bjarnadóttir	Social Democratic Alliance

=== Substitute ===
Name	Party
Guðfríður Lilja Grétarsdóttir	Left-Green Movement
Höskuldur Þórhallsson	Progressive Party
Jón Gunnarsson	Independence Party
Mörður Árnason	Social Democratic Alliance
Ólína Þorvarðardóttir	Social Democratic Alliance
Ragnheiður Elín Árnadóttir	Independence Party
Róbert Marshall	Social Democratic Alliance
Sigríður Ingibjörg Ingadóttir	Social Democratic Alliance

== See also ==
- List of standing committees of the Icelandic parliament
