= Environment and Communications Committee (Iceland) =

Standing committee of the Parliament of Iceland

The Environment and Communications Committee (Icelandic: Umhverfis- og samgöngunefnd) is a standing committee of the Icelandic parliament.

== Jurisdiction ==
According to law № 55/1991, with later amendments, all matters relating to the following subjects are referred to the Environment and Communications Committee:

- Planning
- Construction
- Research
- Consulting
- Protection
- Sustainability
- Transport
- Implementation

== Members, 140th parliament ==
The main members have seats in the committees and attend the meetings. When they are unable to do so the substitute members temporarily take their place.

=== Main ===
Name	Party
Atli Gíslason	independent
Árni Johnsen	Independence Party
Ásmundur Einar Daðason	Progressive Party
Birgir Ármannsson	Independence Party
Guðfríður Lilja Grétarsdóttir, chairman	Left-Green Movement
Mörður Árnason	Social Democratic Alliance
Ólína Þorvarðardóttir, 1st vice-chairman	Social Democratic Alliance
Róbert Marshall	Social Democratic Alliance
Þuríður Backman, 2nd vice-chairman	Left-Green Movement

=== Substitute ===
Name	Party
Álfheiður Ingadóttir	Left-Green Movement
Einar Kristinn Guðfinnsson	Independence Party
Jónína Rós Guðmundsdóttir	Social Democratic Alliance
Kristján L. Möller	Social Democratic Alliance
Lúðvík Geirsson	Social Democratic Alliance
Ragnheiður Elín Árnadóttir	Independence Party
Vigdís Hauksdóttir	Progressive Party
Þráinn Bertelsson	Left-Green Movement

== See also ==
- List of standing committees of the Icelandic parliament
