= List of standing committees of the Icelandic parliament =

The following is a list of standing committees of the Icelandic parliament.

#	Committee (Icelandic)	Chairman	1st Vice-Chairman	2nd vice-Chairman
1	Budget Committee (Fjárlaganefnd)	Vigdís Hauksdóttir (PP)	Guðlaugur Þór Þórðarson (IP)	Oddný Guðbjörg Harðardóttir (SDA)
2	Constitutional and Supervisory Committee (Stjórnskipunar- og eftirlitsnefnd)	Ögmundur Jónasson (LGM)	Brynjar Níelsson (IP)	Birgitta Jónsdóttir (PPI)
3	Economic Affairs and Trade Committee (Efnahags- og viðskiptanefnd)	Frosti Sigurjónsson (PP)	Pétur Haraldsson Blöndal (IP)	Willum Þór Þórsson (PP)
4	Environment and Communications Committee (Umhverfis- og samgöngunefnd)	Höskuldur Þórhallsson (PP)	Katrín Júlíusdóttir (SDA)	Haraldur Einarsson (PP)
5	Foreign Affairs Committee (Utanríkismálanefnd)	Birgir Ármannsson (IP)	Ásmundur Einar Daðason (PP)	Vilhjálmur Bjarnason (IP)
6	Industrial Affairs Committee (Atvinnuveganefnd)	Jón Gunnarsson (IP)	Lilja Rafney Magnúsdóttir (LGM)	Haraldur Benediktsson (IP)
7	Judicial Affairs and Education Committee (Allsherjar- og menntamálanefnd)	Unnur Brá Konráðsdóttir (IP)	Páll Valur Björnsson (BF)	Líneik Anna Sævarsdóttir (PP)
8	Welfare Committee (Velferðarnefnd)	Sigríður Ingibjörg Ingadóttir (SDA)	Þórunn Egilsdóttir (PP)	Björt Ólafsdóttir (BF)

== See also ==
- List of Icelandic ministries
- Government agencies in Iceland
