= Foreign Affairs Committee (Iceland) =

Standing committee of the Icelandic parliament

The Foreign Affairs Committee (Icelandic: Utanríkismálanefnd) is a standing committee of the Icelandic parliament.

== Jurisdiction ==
According to law № 55/1991, with later amendments, all matters relating to the following subjects are referred to the Foreign Affairs Committee:

- External communication
- International organisations
- Defence
- Security
- Export
- European Economic Area (EEA)
- Development aid
- International and global affairs

== Members, 140th parliament ==
The main members have seats in the committees and attend the meetings. When they are unable to do so the substitute members temporarily take their place.

=== Main ===
Name	Party
Árni Páll Árnason, 1st vice-chairman	Social Democratic Alliance
Árni Þór Sigurðsson, chairman	Left-Green Movement
Bjarni Benediktsson	Independence Party
Guðfríður Lilja Grétarsdóttir	Left-Green Movement
Gunnar Bragi Sveinsson	Progressive Party
Helgi Hjörvar	Social Democratic Alliance
Mörður Árnason, 2nd vice-chairman	Social Democratic Alliance
Ragnheiður Elín Árnadóttir	Independence Party
Sigmundur Davíð Gunnlaugsson	Progressive Party

=== Substitute ===
Name	Party
Álfheiður Ingadóttir	Left-Green Movement
Ásmundur Einar Daðason	Progressive Party
Illugi Gunnarsson	Independence Party
Lúðvík Geirsson	Social Democratic Alliance
Ólöf Nordal	Independence Party
Róbert Marshall	Social Democratic Alliance
Sigurður Ingi Jóhannsson	Progressive Party
Valgerður Bjarnadóttir	Social Democratic Alliance
Þuríður Backman	Left-Green Movement

== See also ==
- List of standing committees of the Icelandic parliament
