= Economic Affairs and Trade Committee (Iceland) =

Standing committee of the Icelandic parliament

The Economic Affairs and Trade Committee (Icelandic: Efnahags- og viðskiptanefnd) is a standing committee of the Icelandic parliament.

== Jurisdiction ==
According to law № 55/1991, with later amendments, all matters relating to the following subjects are referred to the Economic Affairs and Trade Committee:

- Banking
- Taxation
- Customs

== Members, 140th parliament ==
The main members have seats in the committees and attend the meetings. When they are unable to do so the substitute members temporarily take their place.

=== Main ===
Name	Party
Birkir Jón Jónsson	Progressive Party
Guðlaugur Þór Þórðarson	Independence Party
Helgi Hjörvar, chairman	Social Democratic Alliance
Lilja Rafney Magnúsdóttir, 2nd vice-chairman	Left-Green Movement
Lilja Mósesdóttir	independent
Magnús Orri Schram	Social Democratic Alliance
Skúli Helgason	Social Democratic Alliance
Tryggvi Þór Herbertsson	Independence Party
Þráinn Bertelsson, 1st vice-chairman	Left-Green Movement

=== Substitute ===
Name	Party
Árni Þór Sigurðsson	Left-Green Movement
Bjarni Benediktsson	Independence Party
Björgvin G. Sigurðsson	Social Democratic Alliance
Björn Valur Gíslason	Left-Green Movement
Eygló Harðardóttir	Progressive Party
Jón Gunnarsson	Independence Party
Sigmundur Ernir Rúnarsson	Social Democratic Alliance
Sigríður Ingibjörg Ingadóttir	Social Democratic Alliance

== See also ==
- List of standing committees of the Icelandic parliament
