= Virtual limited liability company =

A virtual limited liability company (VLLC) is a type of legal entity that does not require a physical presence or in-person board meetings. The company type was first legalised in Vermont, USA in 2008 and in 2010 the Icelandic Modern Media Initiative began drafting legislation based on the Vermont law which would allow virtual companies in Iceland.

The project, which was started by MP Birgitta Jónsdóttir (chairman), information activist Smári McCarthy and others was later succeeded by the International Modern Media Institute and is currently ongoing.
