= Constitutional and Supervisory Committee (Iceland) =

Standing committee of the Icelandic parliament

The Constitutional and Supervisory Committee (Icelandic: Stjórnskipunar- og eftirlitsnefnd) is a standing committee of the Icelandic parliament.

== Jurisdiction ==
According to law № 55/1991, with later amendments, all matters relating to the following subjects are referred to the Constitutional and Supervisory Committee:

- Constitution
- President
- Parliament
- Agencies
- Election
- Cabinet

== Members, 140th parliament ==
The main members have seats in the committees and attend the meetings. When they are unable to do so the substitute members temporarily take their place.

=== Main ===
Name	Party
Álfheiður Ingadóttir, 1st vice-chairman	Left-Green Movement
Birgir Ármannsson	Independence Party
Lúðvík Geirsson	Social Democratic Alliance
Magnús Orri Schram	Social Democratic Alliance
Margrét Tryggvadóttir	The Movement
Ólöf Nordal	Independence Party
Róbert Marshall, 2nd vice-chairman	Social Democratic Alliance
Valgerður Bjarnadóttir, chairman	Social Democratic Alliance
Vigdís Hauksdóttir	Progressive Party

=== Substitute ===
Name	Party
Árni Páll Árnason	Social Democratic Alliance
Guðlaugur Þór Þórðarson	Independence Party
Gunnar Bragi Sveinsson	Progressive Party
Helgi Hjörvar	Social Democratic Alliance
Mörður Árnason	Social Democratic Alliance
Pétur Blöndal	Independence Party
Sigmundur Ernir Rúnarsson	Social Democratic Alliance
Þór Saari	The Movement
Þráinn Bertelsson	Left-Green Movement

== See also ==
- List of standing committees of the Icelandic parliament
