= Skattrannsóknarstjóri ríkisins =

Icelandic government agency

Skattrannsóknarstjóri ríkisins, also known as the Directorate of Tax Investigations (DTI) is responsible for investigating legal cases where suspicions of tax fraud, tax evasion, or other violations of tax law are found within Iceland. The DTI is accountable to the Minister of Finance.

== History and organization ==
The DTI was founded in 1993 with the goal of functioning as a specialized and autonomous agency focused specifically on the tax system. The director of the DTI is appointed by, and responsible only to, the Minister of Finance. While the central DTI office is located in Reykjavík, the office still investigates all alleged tax crimes in all of Iceland's nine tax districts of Reykjavík, Akranes, Ísafjörður, Siglufjörður, Akureyri, Egilsstaðir, Hella, Vestmannaeyjar and Hafnarfjörður. The DTI operates under Icelandic regulation and law no. 361/1995, 50/1988, 45/1987, 113/1990, 145/1994, 144/1990 and 37/1993.

=== Budget ===
The DTI has 24 employees, most of whom have university degrees in business, economics, or law. In 2006 the DTI's allotted budget was ISK 155m or ~$2.2m USD. The DTI submits an annual budget to the Ministry of Finance by February 15 each year. The report includes a report on the DTI's operations and activities as well as a balance sheet for the previous year.

== Purpose ==
The main role of the DTI is to investigate and inform on the infringement of Icelandic tax laws, and reduce tax evasion. The DTI is tasked with three central objectives by the Ministry of Finance.

1. Investigate all cases where there is a suspected presence of tax fraud.
2. To represent the state of Iceland in legal cases in which a penalty procedure is conducted through a closed administrative action by the State Internal Revenue Board.
3. The preparation of major cases for criminal proceedings, and for further investigation by both the National Commissioner of the Icelandic Police and the Directorate of Public Prosecutions.

There are two objectives of DTI investigations:

1. Conclusions of DTI investigations must be a basis for tax assessment.
2. Conclusions of DTI investigations must serve as a basis for possible criminal proceedings.

The DTI is tasked with investigating violations of all Icelandic tax laws levied or enforced by the Directorate of Internal Revenue, and violations of the Accounting Act and Financial Statements Act. Any other activities fall outside the DTI's scope of authority. Once a tax investigation case has concluded, the DTI decides whether or not criminal proceedings are initiated. If criminal proceedings are initiated, they may proceed in three manners. The taxpayer is fined an amount deemed necessary by the DTI, the DTI presents a payment claim before the State Internal Revenue Board, or the case is referred to the Icelandic Police. Each year, the DTI investigates ~100 tax fraud cases. Tax fraud in Iceland tends to be concentrated in the restaurant and food industries.

== Relationship with district tax offices ==
When a district tax office finds an Icelandic taxpayer in breach of tax law after conducting their general tax control, the DTI receives the case from the district tax office. Any case where there is a suspicion of possible tax fraud, it is required by law to be reported to the DTI. The DTI can also receive cases from state tax collectors and the police if technical expertise is needed in accounting or fraud cases.

== Successes ==
Since its inception, the DTI has implemented major changes in how the Icelandic government combats tax crimes. Thanks to the DTI's efforts, approximately ISK 4 billion or ~$58 million USD has been collected as a direct result of DTI's proceedings over the "past several years".

=== 2015 Tax evasion case ===
In 2015, the DTI released a statement that a whistle blower who had offered them data and documents relating to tax evasion by people linked to Iceland requested ISK 150 million (~US$1.1 million). The information in question was a large leak of sensitive information reportedly showing that The Hongkong and Shanghai Banking Corporation (HSBC) had assisted clients worldwide in tax evasion. The DTI had initially requested government support to pay for the data, however former Minister of Finance Bjarni Benediktsson later stated that the DTI would only pay for the data if the fee was in proportion to the collected tax from the accounts in question. One of the six individuals in the DTI's investigation is an Icelandic passport holder, while the other 5 have other ties to the country.
