= Industrial Affairs Committee (Iceland) =

Standing committee of the Icelandic parliament

The Industrial Affairs Committee (Icelandic: Atvinnuveganefnd) is a standing committee of the Icelandic parliament.

== Jurisdiction ==
According to law № 55/1991, with later amendments, all matters relating to the following subjects are referred to the Industrial Affairs Committee:

- Fishery
- Agriculture
- Industry
- Energy
- Innovation
- Technical development
- Employment

== Members, 140th parliament ==
The main members have seats in the committees and attend the meetings. When they are unable to do so the substitute members temporarily take their place.

=== Main ===
Name	Party
Björn Valur Gíslason	Left-Green Movement
Einar Kristinn Guðfinnsson	Independence Party
Jón Gunnarsson	Independence Party
Kristján L. Möller, chairman	Social Democratic Alliance
Lilja Rafney Magnúsdóttir, 1st vice-chairman	Left-Green Movement
Ólína Þorvarðardóttir	Social Democratic Alliance
Sigmundur Ernir Rúnarsson, 2nd vice-chairman	Social Democratic Alliance
Sigurður Ingi Jóhannsson	Progressive Party
Þór Saari	The Movement

=== Substitute ===
Name	Party
Árni Þór Sigurðsson	Left-Green Movement
Ásbjörn Óttarsson	Independence Party
Birgitta Jónsdóttir	The Movement
Birkir Jón Jónsson	Progressive Party
Björgvin G. Sigurðsson	Social Democratic Alliance
Guðfríður Lilja Grétarsdóttir	Left-Green Movement
Magnús Orri Schram	Social Democratic Alliance
Skúli Helgason	Social Democratic Alliance
Unnur Brá Konráðsdóttir	Independence Party

== See also ==
- List of standing committees of the Icelandic parliament
