= Smári McCarthy =

Icelandic activist

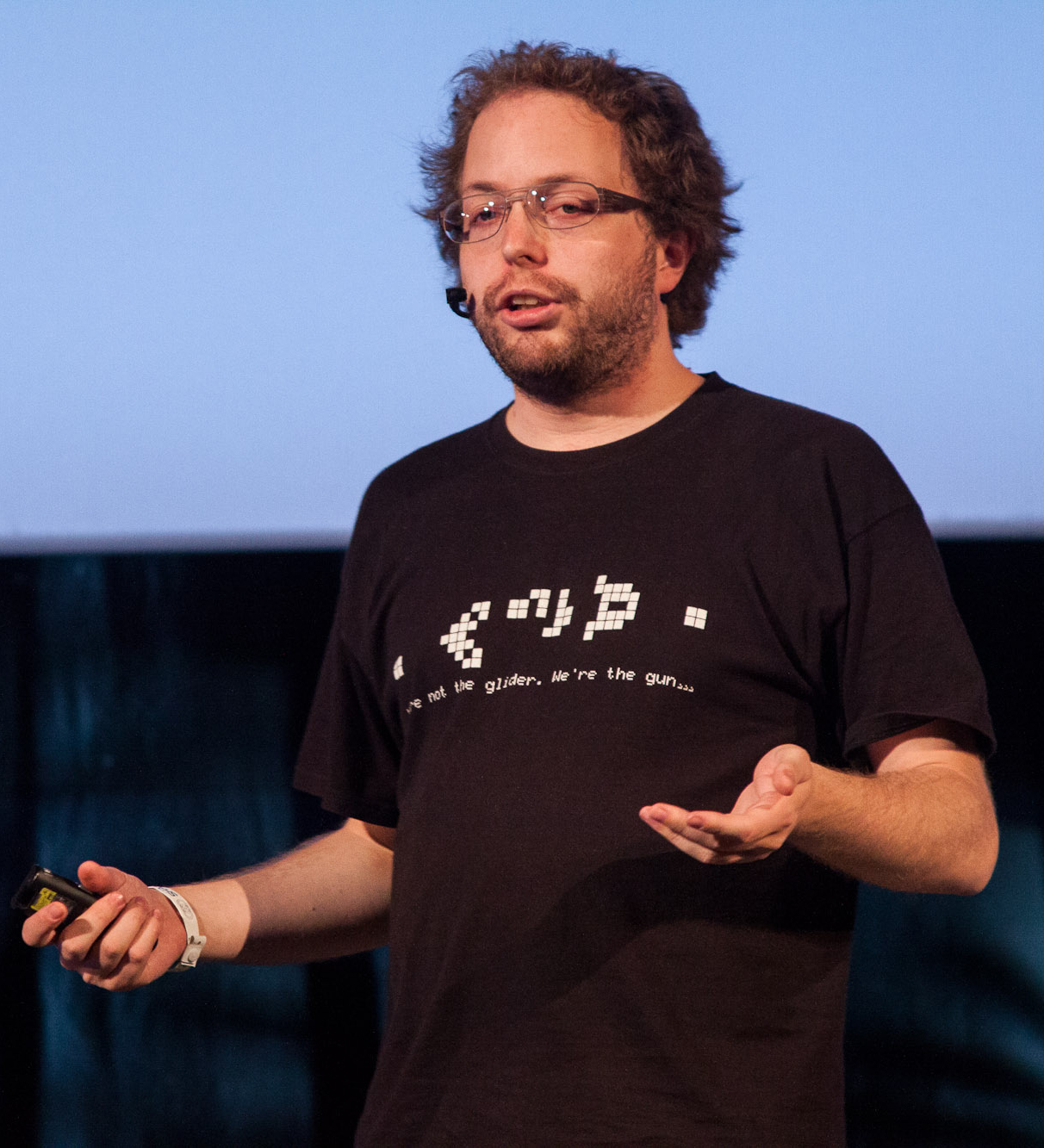
- Smári McCarthy in 2012

Member of the Althing
- Incumbent
- Assumed office 29 October 2016
- Constituency: South Constituency

Personal details
- Born: 7 February 1984 (age 42) Reykjavík, Iceland
- Party: Pirate Party (2013–present)
- Education: University of Iceland
- Occupation: Politician, innovator and information activist
- Known for: Icelandic Digital Freedom Society; International Modern Media Institute; Mailpile
- Website: smarimccarthy.is

Smári McCarthy (Icelandic: [ˈsmauːrɪ mahˈkar̥ðɪ]; born 7 February 1984) is an Icelandic-Irish politician, innovator and information activist known for his work relating to direct democracy, transparency and privacy.

== Early life ==
McCarthy was born in Reykjavík, Iceland, the son of Kolbrún Óskarsdóttir and Eugene McCarthy. His mother is Icelandic while his father is Irish. At age one, his family moved to England. At age 9, they returned to Iceland, settling in Vestmannaeyjar, a town and archipelago off the south coast. He studied mathematics at the University of Iceland, but left to get involved with the digital fabrication movement.

== Career ==
McCarthy got involved in the digital fabrication movement in 2007 and was involved in the creation of the first Icelandic fab lab in Vestmannaeyjar. He has worked with Fab Labs elsewhere, including Jalalabad, Afghanistan.

The same year, McCarthy proposed the Shadow Parliament Project, a project intending to "crowdsource democracy". In an essay outlining the project, he described what is now known as Liquid Democracy. The project launched Skuggaþing (Icelandic for "shadow parliament") in early 2010. In 2012, he started the wasa2il software project in order to address shortcomings with existing implementations of Liquid Democracy.

In 2008, he co-founded of the Icelandic Digital Freedom Society (FSFÍ), a free software, privacy and digital rights organization in Iceland.

In 2009, he organized the Icelandic Modern Media Initiative along with various other media freedom and free speech activists, including Birgitta Jónsdóttir, Julian Assange and Rop Gonggrijp. In 2011 the International Modern Media Institute (IMMI) was formed around the initiative, with McCarthy serving as executive director. In 2013, McCarthy he left that role, but he still serves as a board member of IMMI.

In 2012, he co-founded the Icelandic Pirate Party, along with Birgitta Jónsdóttir, Helgi Hrafn Gunnarsson, and various others. He stood as their lead candidate in Iceland's South Constituency in the 2013 parliamentary elections, but he did not win a seat.

In the summer of 2013, McCarthy co-founded the free software project Mailpile along with Bjarni Rúnar Einarsson and Brennan Novak. The team successfully crowdfunded $163,192. McCarthy's role in the company is privacy and security. In 2014, McCarthy joined the editorial board of Scottish pro-independence newspaper Bella Caledonia.

McCarthy left Mailpile to become the chief technologist of the Organized Crime and Corruption Reporting Project, where he has helped design and code the Investigative Dashboard project.

In 2016, McCarthy was elected as a Pirate Party member of the Althing. He got reelected in 2017, but did not stand in the 2021 elections.

=== Public speaking and activism ===
McCarthy has spoken at numerous conferences such as Oekonux, FSCONS, Internet at Liberty and SHARE as well as having lectured at various universities and summer schools. Common themes include direct or electronic democracy, press freedoms, a critique of industrialization as a centralizing force and the culture of the Internet. More recently he has spoken about privacy in the context of state surveillance.

McCarthy was a member of WikiLeaks. According to Julian Assange: The Unauthorised Autobiography, McCarthy gave British-American journalist Heather Brooke copies of US diplomatic cable leak. After seeing the reaction of other WikiLeaks members when they learned this, McCarthy remotely accessed Brooke's computer and wiped the files. According to McCarthy, Brooke had given him permission to access her system, but not delete the file. McCarthy explained his actions to Brooke saying, "I've been put under a lot of very serious pressure and I'm afraid for my security." According to Wired in 2011, the events could put WikiLeaks in legal jeopardy.

In 2012, WikiLeaks has alleged that McCarthy was approached by agents of the FBI in Washington, D.C. In 2013, it was reported that in October 2011 Google was served with a search warrant for the content of McCarthy's emails over his work with WikiLeaks.

McCarthy has made appearances in We Steal Secrets: The Story of WikiLeaks, SVT's documentary Wikirebels and VPRO's de Wikileaks Code as well as numerous television interviews.

McCarthy is a supporter of the Campaign for the Establishment of a United Nations Parliamentary Assembly, an organisation which campaigns for democratic reformation of the United Nations and the creation of a more accountable international political system. He is also a signatory of the Campaign for Nuclear Disarmament's Parliamentary Pledge.

== Selected writing ==
- Passing over Eisenhower
- Where States Go To Die: Military Artifacts, International Espionage And The End Of Liberal Democracy
- Cloud Computing: Centralization and Data Sovereignty, with Primavera De Filippi
- Mediating Democracy in Redvolution: El poder del ciudadano conectado
- Bergeron's Children in Despatches from the Invisible Revolution, edited by Keith Kahn-Harris and Dougald Hine
- Cloud Computing: Legal Issues in Centralized Architectures with Primavera de Filippi in Net Neutrality and Other Challenges for the Future of the Internet
- The Future of Information Freedom in The Future we Deserve, edited by Vinay Gupta
- The End of (artificial) Scarcity in Free Beer, edited by Stian Rødven Eide
- Islands of Resilience, with Eleanor Saitta
