= Baldursdóttir =

Baldursdóttir is an Icelandic patronymic meaning "daughter of Baldur".

- Anna María Baldursdóttir (born 1994), Icelandic footballer
- Ásgerður Baldursdóttir (born 1987), Icelandic footballer
- Eva Pandora Baldursdóttir (born 1990), Icelandic politician
- Kolbrún Baldursdóttir (born 1959), Icelandic politician
- Kristín Marja Baldursdóttir (born 1949), Icelandic writer

== See also ==
- Balderson
