= Eva Pandora Baldursdóttir =

Icelandic politician (born 1990)

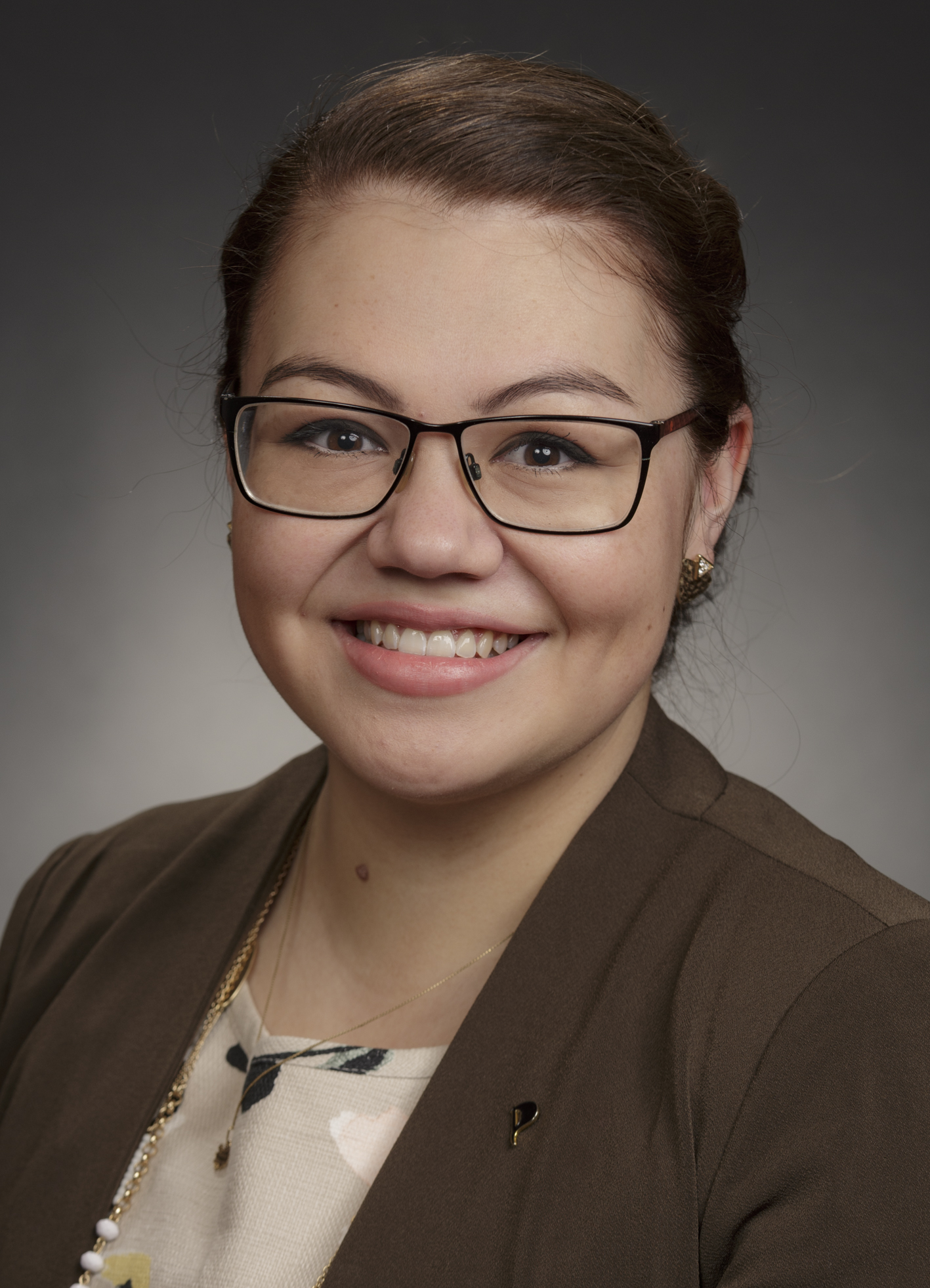
Image of Eva Pandora Baldursdóttir

Eva Pandora Baldursdóttir (born October 8, 1990) is a member of the Alþingi for the Pirate Party of Iceland.

== Early life and education ==
Baldursdóttir earned a B.A. in Accounting and Business Management from Háskóli Íslands in 2013, and a graduate-level additional diploma in public administration in 2017. Prior to entering politics, Baldursdóttir worked in the travel industry, including for Icelandair.

== Political career ==
Baldursdóttir has represented the Northwest Constituency since 2016.

She is presently a member of the Constitutional and Supervisory Committee (since 2017), and previously served on the Industrial Affairs (2017) and Economic Affairs & Trade (2016) Committees. She was the 2nd Deputy Chairman on the Economic Affairs & Trade Committee during her 2016 time serving on the committee.

Irony struck in 2017 when Baldursdóttir, a member of the Pirate Party of Iceland, was forced to wear an eyepatch during a television debate after one of her children scratched her eye. She posted on Facebook prior to the debate and made light of the eyepatch.
