= Geirsson =

Geirsson is an Icelandic patronymic. Notable people with the name include:

- Elmar Geirsson (born 1948), Icelandic footballer
- Hafsteinn Geirsson (born 1980), Icelandic sailor
- Logi Geirsson (born 1982), Icelandic handballer
- Lúðvík Geirsson (born 1959), Icelandic politician
- Marteinn Geirsson (born 1951), Icelandic footballer
