= Transport and Communications Committee =

Transport and Communications Committee may refer to:

- Transport and Communications Committee (Iceland)
- Transport and Communications Committee (Sweden)

== See also ==
- Standing Committee on Transport and Communications, Norway
