= Pétursdóttir =

Pétursdóttir is a surname. Notable people with the surname include:

- Anna-Lind Pétursdóttir, Icelandic professor
- Bryndís Pétursdóttir (1928–2020), Icelandic actress
- Lilja Pétursdóttir (born 2004), Icelandic model
- Linda Pétursdóttir (born 1969), Icelandic businesswoman
- Sólveig Pétursdóttir (born 1952), Icelandic politician
