= Ingadóttir =

Ingadóttir is an Icelandic matronymic. Notable people with the name include:

- Álfheiður Ingadóttir (born 1951), Icelandic politician
- Sigríður Ingibjörg Ingadóttir (born 1968), Icelandic economist and politician
