= Foreign Affairs Committee =

Foreign Affairs Committee may refer to:

- Canadian House of Commons Standing Committee on Foreign Affairs and International Development
- Canadian Senate Standing Committee on Foreign Affairs and International Trade
- Foreign Affairs Committee of the National People's Congress, China
- European Parliament Committee on Foreign Affairs
- Foreign Affairs Committee (France), in the French National Assembly
- Foreign Affairs Committee (Iceland), in the Parliament of Iceland
- Committee on External Affairs, in the Parliament of India
- Foreign Affairs and Defense Committee, in the Knesset of Israel
- Committee on Foreign Affairs (Sweden), in the Parliament of Sweden
- Foreign Affairs Select Committee, in the United Kingdom House of Commons
- United States House Committee on Foreign Affairs
- United States Senate Committee on Foreign Relations

== See also ==
- Committee on International Relations (disambiguation)
