= Þorsteinn Víglundsson =

Icelandic politician (born 1969)

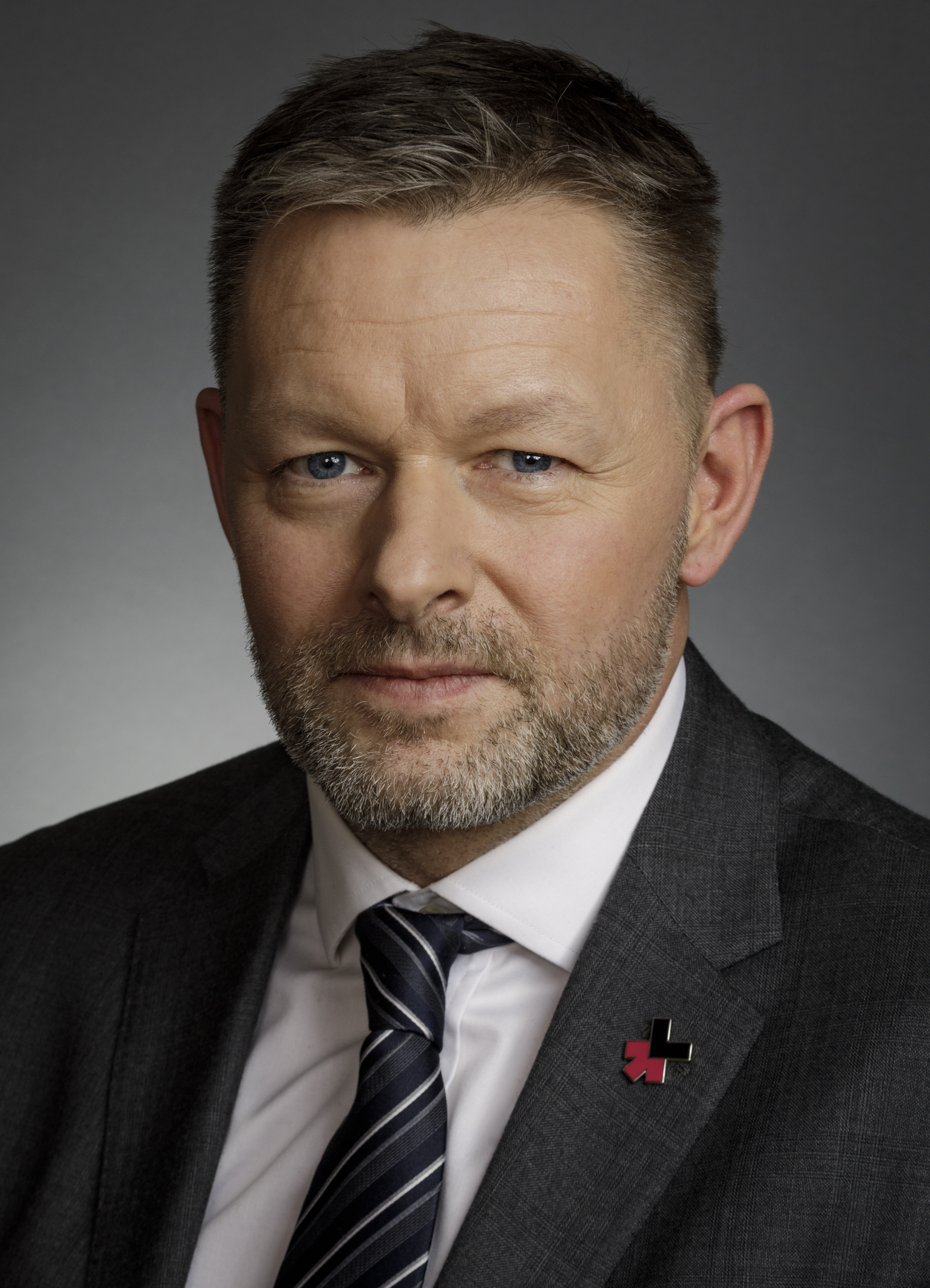

Minister for Social Affairs and Equality
- In office 11 January 2017 – 30 November 2017
- Prime Minister: Bjarni Benediktsson
- Preceded by: Eygló Harðardóttir (Minister of Social Affairs and Housing)
- Succeeded by: Ásmundur Einar Daðason

Personal details
- Born: 22 November 1969 (age 56) Seltjarnarnes, Iceland
- Party: Viðreisn
- Education: University of Iceland (BA); University of Navarra (AMP)

Þorsteinn Víglundsson (born 22 November 1969) is a former Icelandic politician who served as a Member of the Althing for Viðreisn. He served as Iceland's Minister of Social Affairs and Equality in 2017, and under his leadership, a bill of law (amendments to the Gender Equality Act No. 10/2008) was passed by the Icelandic Parliament (Althingi) with a vast majority on 1 June 2017 and came into force on 1 January 2018. Companies and institutions employing 25 or more workers, on an annual basis, are required to obtain equal pay certification of their equal pay systems and the implementation thereof. The purpose of this obligatory certification is to enforce the current legislation prohibiting discriminatory practices based on gender and requiring women and men working for the same employer to be paid equal wages and enjoy equal terms of employment for the same jobs or jobs of equal value.

Prior to entering politics, Þorsteinn served as executive director of SA - Business Iceland, a service organization for Icelandic businesses.

Political offices
Preceded by Eygló Harðardóttir as Minister of Social Affairs and Housing	Minister for Social Affairs and Equality; 2017	Succeeded by Ásmundur Einar Daðason
