= Balderson =

Balderson may refer to:

== People ==
- Dick Balderson (born 1946), baseball executive
- George Balderson (born 2000), cricketer
- Margaret Balderson (born 1935), Australian novelist
- Scott Balderson (born 1989), Australian-born footballer
- Steve Balderson (born 1975), film director
- Thomas Balderson (born 1999), cricketer
- Troy Balderson (born 1962), American politician
- Walter Balderson (1926–2023), television editor and video engineer

== Places ==
- Balderson, Ontario
- Balderson, West Virginia

== See also ==
- Claire Bolderson, journalist and radio broadcaster
