= Committee on International Relations (disambiguation) =

Committee on International Relations is a graduate program at the University of Chicago.

It may also refer to:

- an earlier name (1975 to 1978; 1995 to 2007) used by the United States House Committee on Foreign Affairs

== See also ==
- Foreign Affairs Committee (disambiguation)
- Portfolio Committee on International Relations and Cooperation
- Council on Foreign Relations
- European Council on Foreign Relations
