= List of Icelandic ministries =

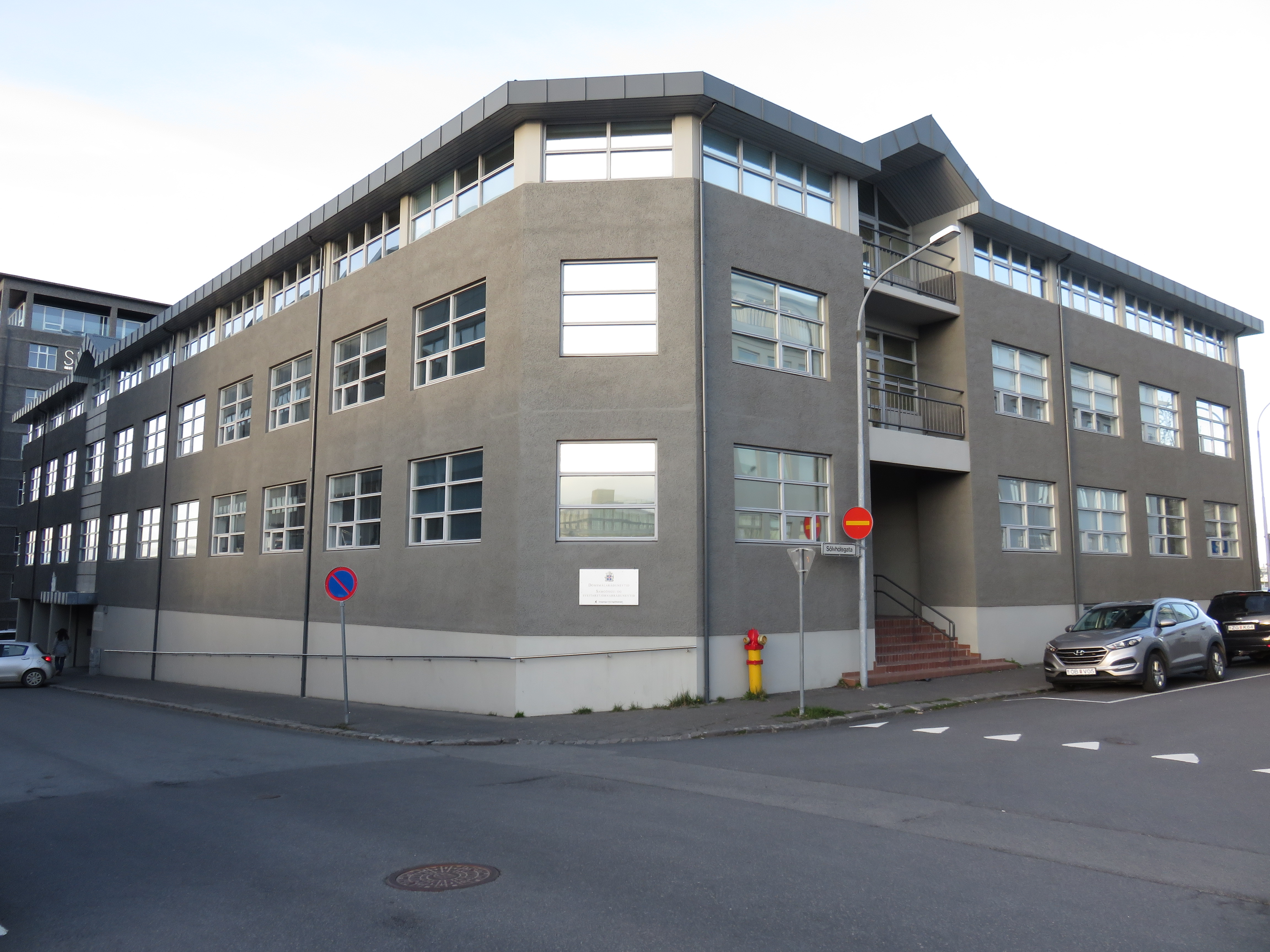
Ministry of Justice and Ministry of Transport and Local Government building in Reykjavík in 2018

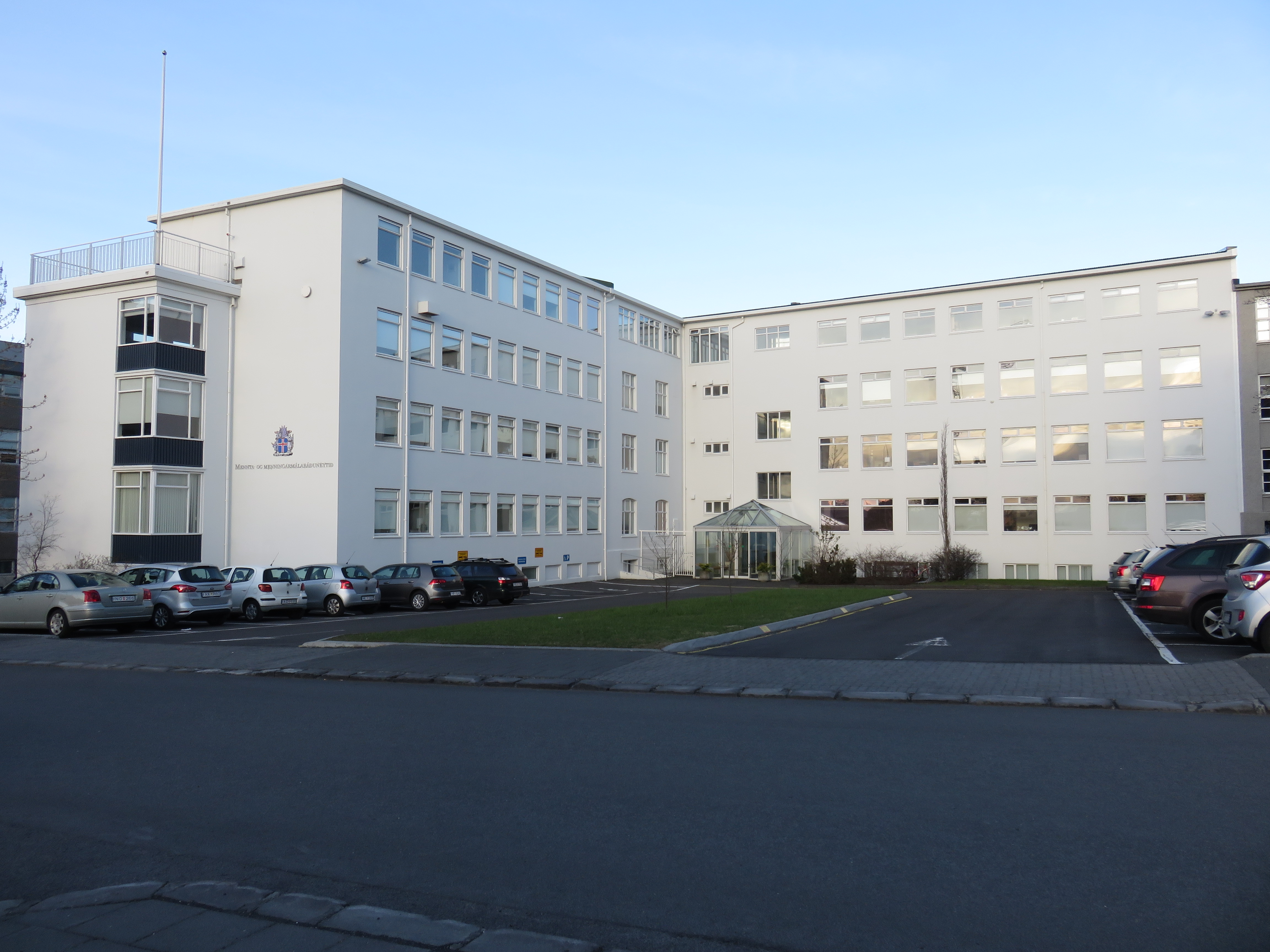
Ministry of Education, Science and Culture building in Reykjavík in 2018

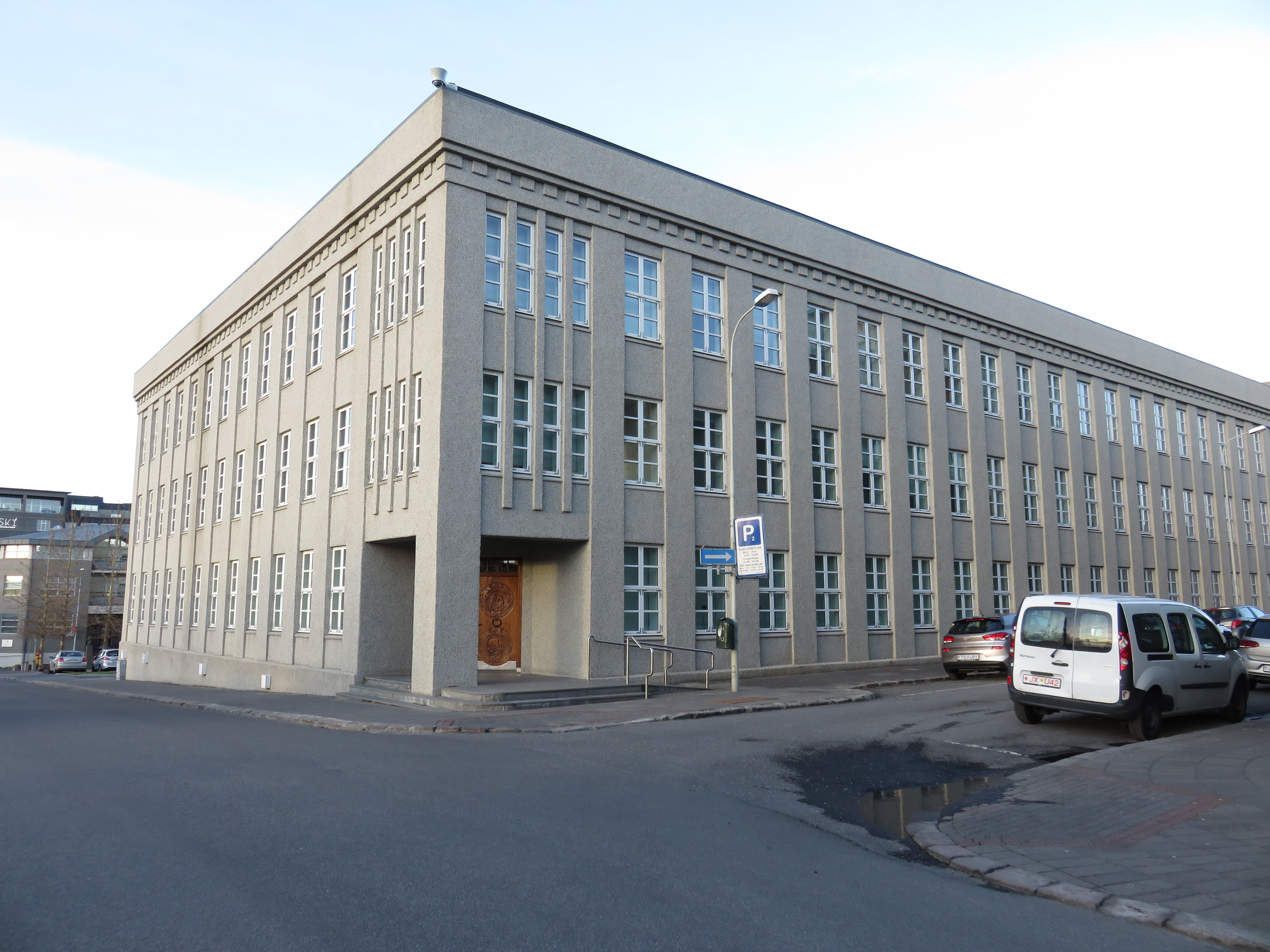
Ministry of Finance and Economic Affairs building in Reykjavík in 2018

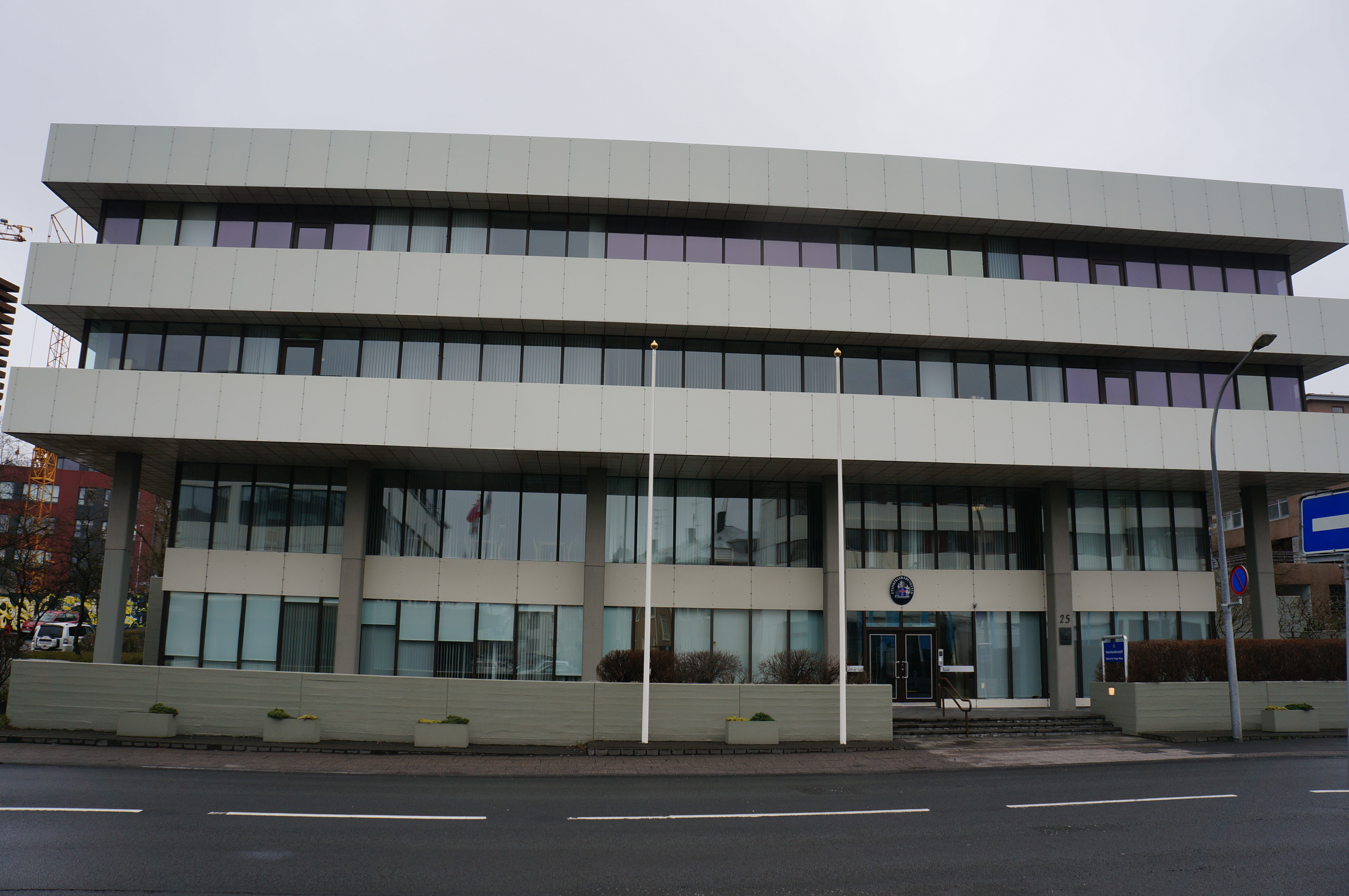
Ministry of Foreign Affairs building in Reykjavík in 2016

This is a list of Icelandic government ministries.

== Ministries ==
#	Name	Icelandic name
1	Prime Minister's Office	Forsætisráðuneytið
2	Ministry of Education and Children	Mennta- og barnamálaráðuneytið
3	Ministry for the Environment, Energy and Climate	Umhverfis- og auðlindaráðuneytið
4	Ministry of Finance and Economic Affairs	Fjármála- og efnahagsráðuneytið
5	Ministry for Foreign Affairs	Utanríkisráðuneytið
6	Ministry of Industries and Innovation	Atvinnuvega- og nýsköpunarráðuneytið
7	Ministry of Infrastructure	Innviðaráðuneytið
8	Ministry of Justice	Dómsmálaráðuneytið
9	Ministry of Health	Heilbrigðisráðuneytið
10	Ministry of Social Affairs	Félagsmálaráðuneytið

== Historical ministries ==
Name	Icelandic name	Period
Predecessors of the Ministry of Economic Affairs
Ministry of Industry and Commerce	n/a	1999-2007
Ministry of Business Affairs	Viðskiptaráðuneyti	2007-2010
Predecessors of the Ministry of Interior
Ministry of Communications	Samgönguráðuneyti	January 1, 2011
Ministry of Justice and Human Rights	Dómsmála- og mannréttindaráðuneyti	January 1, 2011
Predecessors of the Ministry of Education, Science and Culture
Prime Minister's Office	Forsætisráðuneyti	n/a
Predecessors of the Ministry for the Environment
none
Predecessors of the Ministry of Finance
none
Predecessors of the Ministry of Fisheries and Agriculture
Ministry of Fisheries	Sjávarútvegsráðuneyti	n/a
Ministry of Agriculture	Landbúnaðarráðuneyti	n/a
Predecessors of the Ministry for Foreign Affairs
Prime Minister's Office	Forsætisráðuneyti	n/a
Predecessors of the Ministry of Health
Ministry of Health and Social Security	Heilbrigðis- og tryggingamálaráðuneyti	n/a
Predecessors of the Ministry of Industry, Energy and Tourism
Ministry of Industry and Business Affairs	Iðnaðar- og viðskiptaráðuneyti	n/a
Predecessors of the Ministry of Justice and Human Rights
Ministry of Justice and Ecclesiastical Affairs	Dóms- og kirkjumálaráðuneyti	2009
Predecessors of the Ministry of Welfare
Ministry of Social Affairs and Social Security	Félags- og tryggingamálaráðuneyti	January 1, 2011
Ministry of Health	Heilbrigðisráðuneyti	January 1, 2011

== See also ==
- Government agencies in Iceland
