= Minister of Social Affairs and Gender Equality (Iceland) =

Ministerial office in the government of Iceland

The Minister of Social Affairs and Gender Equality (Icelandic: Félags- og húsnæðismálaráðherra) is a minister in the Icelandic government and currently works under the Ministry of Welfare together with the Minister of Health.

== Ministers ==
- Ásmundur Einar Daðason
