= Willum Þór Þórsson =

Icelandic footballer, manager, and politician

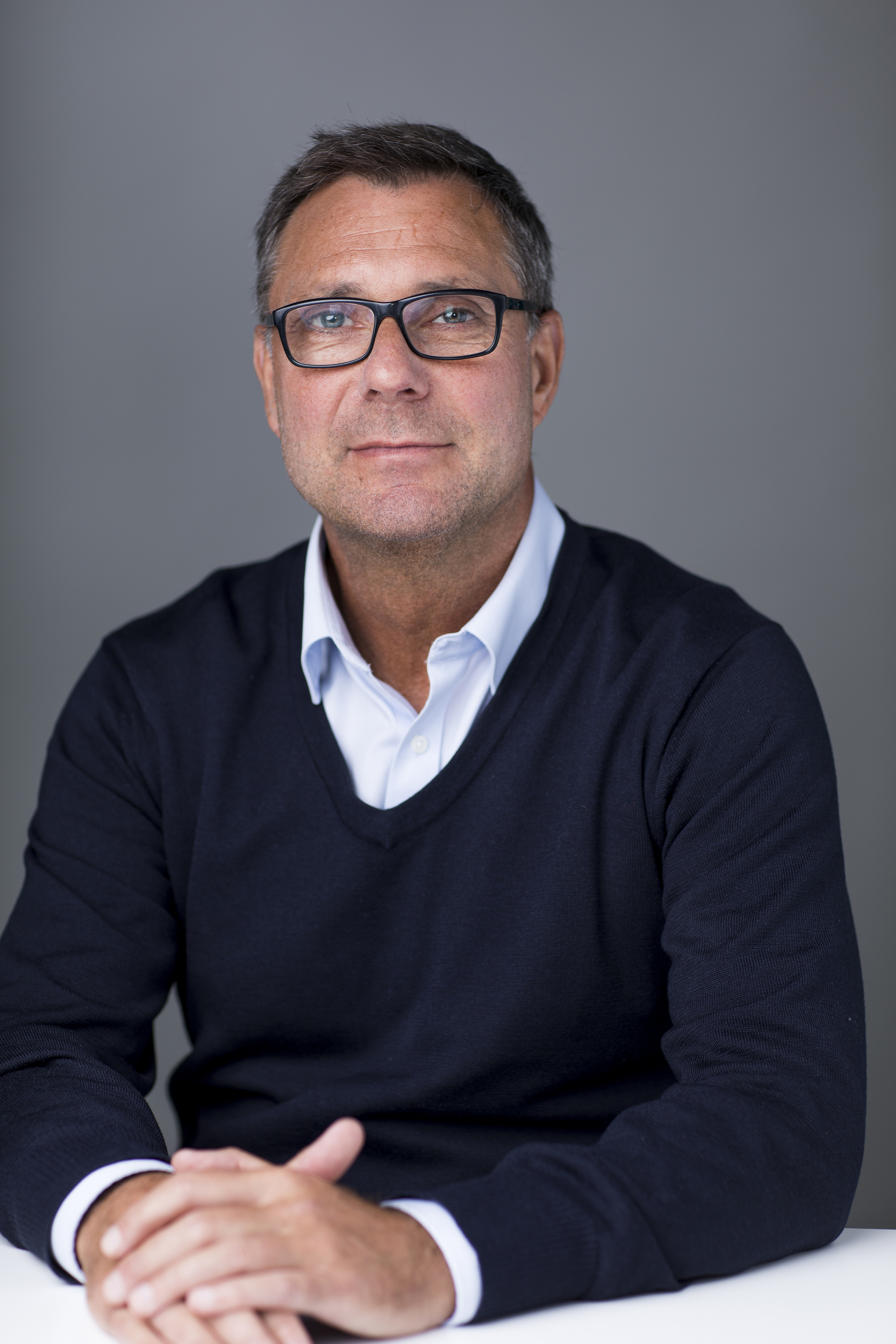
- Willum in 2016

Minister of Health
- In office 28 November 2021 – 21 December 2024
- Prime Minister: Katrín Jakobsdóttir; Bjarni Benediktsson
- Preceded by: Svandís Svavarsdóttir
- Succeeded by: Alma Möller

Personal details
- Born: 17 March 1963 (age 63) Reykjavík, Iceland
- Party: Progressive
- Spouse: Ása Brynjólfsdóttir
- Children: 5, including Willum Þór and Brynjólfur
- Education: University of Copenhagen
Association football career
- Positions: Midfielder; defender
Senior career*
Years	Team	Apps	(Gls)
1980–1989	KR	73+	(12+)
1990–1995	Breiðablik	56+	(15+)
1996-1999	Þróttur	23	(3)
International career
1979	Iceland U17	3	(0)
Managerial career
- 1997–1998: Þróttur
- 2000–2001: Haukar
- 2002–2004: KR
- 2005–2009: Valur
- 2009–2011: Keflavík
- 2010–2011: Iceland national futsal team
- 2011–2012: Leiknir R.
- 2014: Breiðablik (assistant)
- 2016–2017: KR
- * Club domestic league appearances and goals

Willum Þór Þórsson (born 17 March 1963) is an Icelandic former football player and manager and politician. From 2021 to 2024, he served as the Icelandic Minister of Health.

From 2013 to 2016, he served on the Althing, the Icelandic parliament, for the Progressive Party, and is currently a member of parliament since 2017. He holds a Master's degree in Microeconomics from the University of Copenhagen and used to teach economics at Menntaskólinn í Kópavogi.

== Playing career ==
Willum began his career at KR before moving on to Breiðablik and later Þróttur where he started his manager career.

He represented Iceland at youth level both in basketball and football.

== Managerial career ==
Willum led Þróttur to Iceland's top league, the Úrvalsdeild in 1997. The wait had been long as Þróttur last played at the top level in 1985. In 2000, he became the manager of Haukar, and in 2002, he was appointed manager of KR and led them to two successive championships in 2002 and 2003. In 2004 KR finished without a title and Þórsson's contract was not renewed. He took charge of Valur who had just been promoted to the Úrvalsdeild and finished the 2005 season in 2nd place after champions FH.

Valur won the 2005 Icelandic Cup with a 1–0 victory over Fram. In 2006, Valur ended the season in 3rd place and in 2007 Willum managed Valur to their first League title in 20 years and won Manager of the Season in Landsbankadeildin. He left with mutual agreement on 1 July 2009. On 29 September 2009, after the season had finished for the year, he was appointed the new manager of Keflavík.

He is the only manager who has won every single league in Iceland (4 in total), 2nd and 3rd division with Haukar, 1st division with Þróttur and the Premier League with KR and Valur.

In November 2010, Willum was appointed as the first manager for the Icelandic futsal team.

== Political career ==
=== Parliament ===
Willum has taken active part in politics with the Progressive Party. In the 2013 Icelandic parliamentary election he was elected to the Althing for the Southwest constituency and served until 2016, before being elected back into parliament for the same constituency in 2017.

He served as the fourth vice president of the Althing between 2019 and 2021. Furthermore, he sat on the Economic Affairs and Trade Committee between 2013 and 2016 and again between 2020 and 2021, concurrently with the Constitutional and Supervisory Committee during the former term. He also sat on the Judicial Affairs and Education Committee in 2013 and again between 2017 and 2019. He also led the Budget Committee between 2017 and 2021.

== Personal life ==
Willum married to Ása Brynjólfsdóttir, with whom he has five children, which includes Willum Þór Willumsson, an Icelandic international footballer, as well Brynjólfur Andersen Willumsson, another Icelandic international footballer.

Political offices
Preceded by Svandís Svavarsdóttir	Minister of Health; 2021–2024	Succeeded by Alma Möller
