= Anna-Lind Pétursdóttir =

Icelandic academic

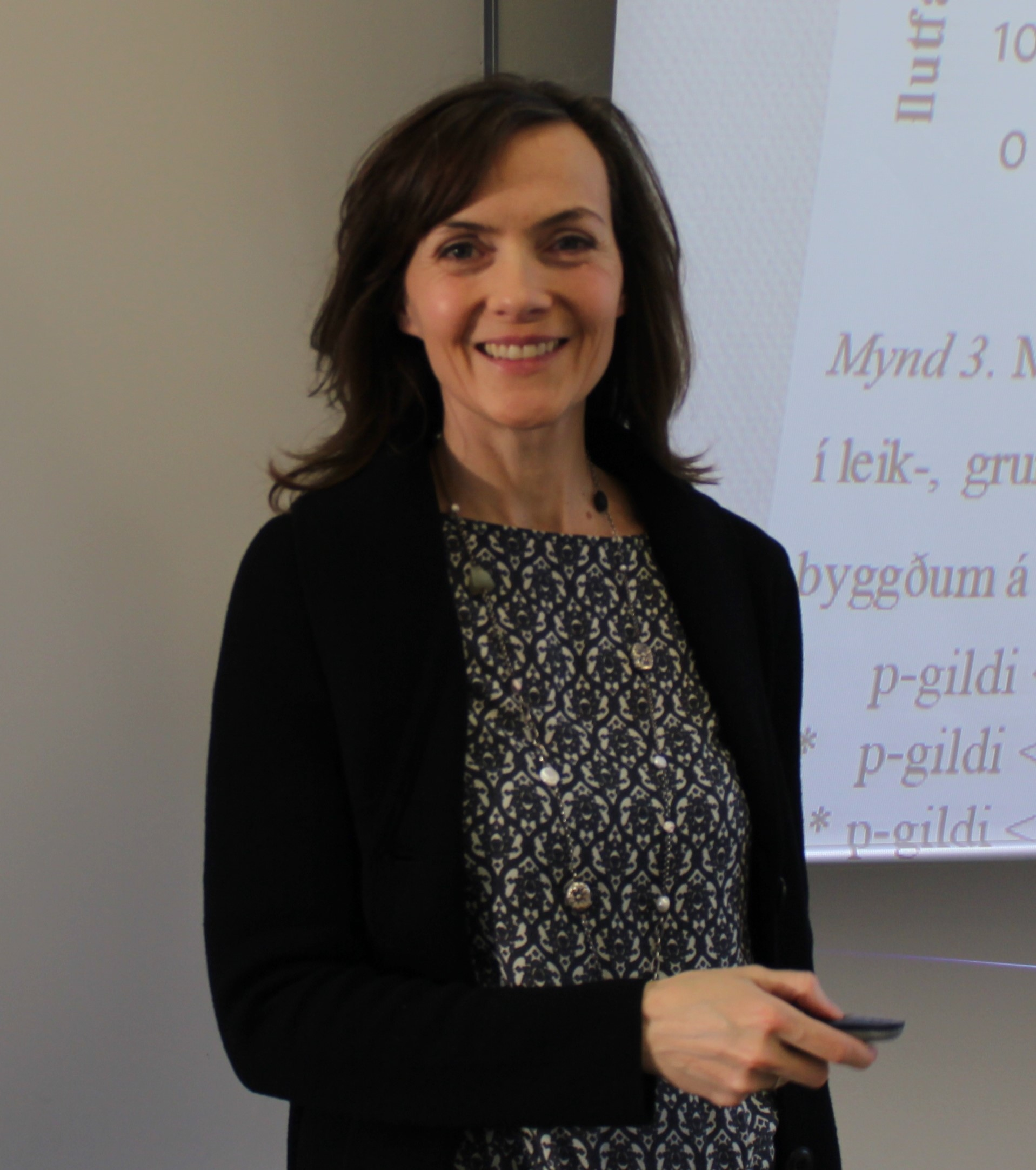
- Occupations: professor of Psychology, Special Education and Behaviour Analysis at the University of Iceland

Anna-Lind Pétursdóttir is an Icelandic Professor of Psychology, Special Education and Behaviour Analysis in the School of Education at the University of Iceland.

== Professional career ==
Anna-Lind completed a matriculation examination from Akureyri Junior College in 1991, BA degree in psychology from the University of Iceland in 1996, Cand. Psych. degree in School Psychology in 2001 and a Dr. Phil. degree in Special Education from the College of Education and Human Development at the University of Minnesota in 2006. She received grants from Fulbright and the Val Bjornson Fund (2003) to pursue doctoral studies in the United States.

Anna-Lind worked as an interventionist and later consultant in early intensive behavior intervention for children with autism from 1995 to 1997, and as a research assistant and later consultant for solving behavior problems in schools from 1998 to 1999. She was a school psychologist at the Consulting Department, City of Reykjavik Preschools from 2001 to 2003 and managed an initiative on improved communication and behaviour in the preschools and primary schools of Reykjavik from 2006 to 2008. Anna-Lind started working at the University of Iceland in 2001 as a part-time lecturer and became an assistant professor of psychology, Special Education and Behaviour Analysis at the School of Education in 2008, Associate Professor in 2010 and a professor in 2018. In 2017 and 2018, she also worked as Head Psychologist in the Department of Education at the Municipality of Kópavogur alongside a part-time position at the University of Iceland.

Anna-Lind has held various commissions of trust within and outside the University of Iceland, for example, in the expert panel for learning and quality assessment at the Directorate of Education, in the field council, curriculum committee and expert panel at the School of Education, University of Iceland and as a representative on the board of the Applied Behaviour Analysis program at the University of Iceland, University of Iceland Research Fund, Association of Special Educators in Iceland and the Icelandic Autistic Society.

== Research ==
Anna-Lind's main emphasis in teaching and research is on assessing effects of evidence-based methods to meet special needs of children, as well as training of school staff in using those methods. Her research projects include assessment of the effects of training for preschool staff in discrete trial teaching on the progress of children with developmental delay; assessment and implementation of peer assisted learning strategies to increase social interactions of students with autism with their classmates; progress monitoring of students at risk for reading difficulties and individualized interventions to improve reading progress; and evaluating the effects of function-based behavior support plans on persistent behaviour problems of students in preschools, primary schools and secondary schools. Her research has also focused on reading instruction in general, such as assessing the perception of preschool teachers of peer-assisted learning strategies and their effects on the beginning reading skills of preschool children. She and dr. Kristen McMaster received a 3-year research grant in 2020 from the Icelandic Centre for Research (Rannís) to assess the implementation and effects of peer assisted learning strategies on reading achievement in 1st and 2nd grade in Iceland.

During her career, Anna-Lind has written a number of academic articles for domestic and foreign journals, in addition to giving many lectures both in Iceland and abroad. She has also held numerous workshops for parents and school professionals on ways to improve behaviour and well-being of children, both under the auspices of the Institute for Continuing Education at the University of Iceland and at schools all over Iceland.

== Personal life ==
Anna-Lind Pétursdóttir was born in Akureyri and grew up there and in Germany. Her parents are Gisela Rabe-Stephan (b. 1943), upper secondary school teacher and Pétur Bjarnason (1939–1976), port director in Akureyri. Her husband is Skúli Helgason, political scientist. They have five children.

== Articles ==
- Pétursdóttir, A. L. & Ragnarsdottir, G. B. (2019). Decreasing student behavior problems and fostering academic engagement through function-based support and fading of token reinforcement. Behavioral Interventions, 34(3), 323–337.
- Pétursdóttir, A. L. (2017). Distance training in function-based interventions to decrease student problem behavior: Summary of 74 cases from a university course. Psychology in the Schools, 54(3), 213–227.
- Anna-Lind Pétursdóttir. (2016). K-PALS-félagakennsla: Dæmi um útfærslur until að styðja við lestrarnám og félagsleg samskipti nemenda með sérþarfir (Kindergarten-Peer-Assisted Learning Strategies: Examples of individualized supports in reading for students with diverse learning needs). Glæður, 25, 14–22.
- Anna-Lind Pétursdóttir, Lucinda Árnadóttir & Snæfríður Björgvinsdottir. (2012). Úr sérúrræði í almennu kennslustofuna: Áhrif stuðningsáætlunar með stighækkandi viðmiðum um frammistöðu. (From segregation to inclusion: Decreasing persistent behavior problems in the classroom through a function-based behavior support plan). Netla (Online Journal on Pedagogy and Education).
- Petursdottir, A.-L., McMaster, K., McComas, J., Bradfield, T., Braganza, V., Koch-McDonald, J., Rodriguez, R. & Scharf, H. (2009). Brief experimental analysis of early reading interventions. Journal of School Psychology, 47, 215–243.
- McMaster, K., Du, X. & Petursdottir, A.-L. (2009). Technical Features of Curriculum-Based Measures for Beginning Writers. Journal of Learning Disabilities, 42 (1), 41–60.
- Petursdottir, A.-L., McComas, J., McMaster, K., & Horner, K. (2007). Assessing the Effects of Scripted Peer Tutoring and Programming Common Stimuli on Social Interactions of a Young Student with Autism Spectrum Disorder. Journal of Applied Behavior Analysis, 40, 353–357.
