= International Modern Media Institute =

International institution promoting freedoms

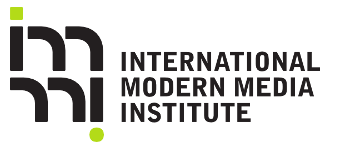
- Formation: 2011

The International Modern Media Institute (IMMI) is an international institution with the aim of promoting debate about laws good for freedom of information, speech, and expression. The institute does this by offering advice and guidance in relation to legislation.

== History ==
On 18 February 2010, the institute entered a parliamentary resolution proposal, commonly known as the Icelandic Modern Media Initiative, into the Icelandic Parliament Alþingi, proposing that Iceland "strongly position itself legally with regard to the protection of freedoms of expression and information". The proposal was adopted unanimously by parliament on 16 June 2010. Birgitta Jónsdóttir from The Movement was the chief sponsor of the proposal, 19 other MPs (out of 63) from all parties in the parliament supported the proposal by co-sponsoring it.

The proposal passed on 16 June was not a piece of final legislation. Instead, it began a process of editing 13 separate laws according to the proposal's specifications. This process was expected to be completed by mid-2012.

After WikiLeaks exposed the loan book of Kaupthing Bank, one of the largest news channels, RUV, was injuncted from displaying the news story. Instead they were forced to simply put a message up of the WikiLeaks website. This led to WikiLeaks being invited by the Digital Freedoms Society to attend an annual conference in Iceland.

The IMMI board has released a report of the legislation on April 16, 2012. It details the status of various proposals that make up IMMI and their progress.

== Support and endorsements ==
The IMMI project was cooperatively organised by numerous organisations and members of the Icelandic parliament. Its principal endorsers were Eva Joly, Index on Censorship, the Icelandic Digital Freedom Society, WikiLeaks, and Icelandic MPs such as Birgitta Jónsdóttir and Róbert Marshall. The project has also had public endorsements from various organisations such as Global Voices, La Quadrature du Net and the Free Knowledge Institute.
