= Oekonux =

The originally German Oekonux (pronounced "urkonooks") project was founded to research the possibilities of free software to fundamentally change the current political and economic structures.

Oekonux considers that the mode of production of free software represents a new mode of production that has the potential to supersede the capitalist mode of production.

See also Hipatia, a related Spanish language initiative.

== History of the project ==
At the first „Wizards of OS“ conference in July 1999 a spontaneous discussion round was founded after the panel „New Economy?“. Thereupon a mailinglist was created to continue the exchange—Oekonux was founded. A website to publish texts and to access mailinglist archives, and a wiki followed soon.

In April 2001 the first Oekonux conference was organized in Dortmund followed by a second conference in November 2002 in Berlin. The third conference took place in Vienna in May 2004, where Creative Commons Austria was launched. A fourth conference was held in Manchester in March 2009 in cooperation with P2P Foundation.

The project launched a journal entitled „Critical Studies in Peer Production“ in 2011. After releasing one issue, the journal editors separated from Oekonux and relaunched the journal under the name „Journal of Peer Production“.
