= Icelandic Digital Freedom Society =

The Icelandic Digital Freedom Society (Icelandic abbreviation: FSFÍ), and also known as the Icelandic Society for Digital Freedoms, is an association aimed at providing legal support for digital freedoms in Iceland. FSFÍ is based out of Reykjavík, Iceland and was co-founded by Smári McCarthy, Tryggvi Björgvinsson, Hallgrímur H. Gunnarsson, Steinn E. Sigurðarson and Freyr G. Ólafsson.

== History ==
Founded in early 2008, FSFÍ started the annual Reykjavík Digital Freedoms Conference in 2008 and organized the annual Nordic Perl Workshop in November 2010.

== Projects ==
=== Reykjavík Digital Freedoms Conference ===
The RDFC, "A Conference on Open Access and Digital Rights", is an annual conference held in Reykjavík, Iceland. RDFC has hosted prominent speakers such as Glyn Moody and John Perry Barlow

=== Icelandic Modern Media Initiative ===
The notion of the IMMI was first considered at the FSFÍ's first Reykjavík Digital Freedoms Conference in 2008.

=== Creative Commons Iceland ===
Initiated in December 2009 with the University of Reykjavík: School of Law, CC Iceland was formed to promote free culture in Iceland through the use of the Creative Commons legal framework.
