= Balderson, West Virginia =

Unincorporated community in West Virginia, United States

Balderson
- Unincorporated community
- Location within the state of West Virginia Balderson (the United States)
- Coordinates: 39°9′34″N 81°40′19″W
- Country: United States
- State: West Virginia
- County: Wood
- Elevation: 925 ft (282 m)
- Time zone: UTC-5 (Eastern (EST))
  - Summer (DST): UTC-4 (EDT)
- GNIS feature ID: 1560340

Balderson was an unincorporated community located in Wood County, West Virginia, United States.
