= Interventionism (medicine) =

Interventionism, when discussing the practice of medicine, is generally a derogatory term used by critics of a medical model in which patients are viewed as passive recipients receiving external treatments provided by the physician that have the effect of prolonging life, or at least of providing a subjective sense of doing everything possible.

Interventionism is commonly encouraged by terminally ill patients and their family members when they are emotionally unprepared to acknowledge that the patient is going to die. Most healthcare providers are uncomfortable telling people that further cure-oriented or life-extending treatment is futile medical care, and patients and families are frequently angry with the provider or feel rejected by the provider when they are given accurate, but negative, information about the patient's prospects. In nearly all cases, "something" can be done for the patient, and families often reward and encourage a provider who proposes a string of useless and potentially harmful treatments; as a result, it is easier for providers to substitute worthless and expensive activity than to honestly admit that nothing will extend the patient's life. An example of one of these interventions is the use of drug-eluting stents for treatment of cardiovascular disease – while initially recommended only for clinically stable patients without comorbidities, physicians began to increasingly use the technology off-label for treatment of more serious disease, with increased morbidity and mortality compared to less invasive procedures.

Interventionism is related to optimism bias. This is the belief that the patient will beat the odds, no matter how unlikely this might be. Optimism bias encourages patients to undertake treatments that have only tiny chances of success, in the erroneous and irrational belief that they will be part of the tiny minority that is successful, rather than part of the vast majority who are not.

With terminally ill patients, the attitude of interventionism prevents providers and patients from taking full advantage of palliative care options. The primary focus for palliative care is improving the patient's immediate, daily life through better management of medications, practical assistance, planning for possible complications, and other services. Patients who use palliative care services usually live longer, have fewer disruptive medical crises, incur fewer medical expenses, and have significantly higher quality of life.
