= Icelandic Modern Media Initiative =

2010 Icelandic parliamentary resolution

The Icelandic Modern Media Initiative was a parliamentary resolution which was unanimously adopted by the Icelandic Parliament 16 June 2010. It aimed to make Iceland a journalistic safe haven, protecting both freedom of expression as well as freedom of information.

== See also ==
- International Modern Media Institute
- WikiLeaks
