= Birgitta Jónsdóttir =

Icelandic writer and politician (born 1967)

MA Birgitta Jónsdóttir
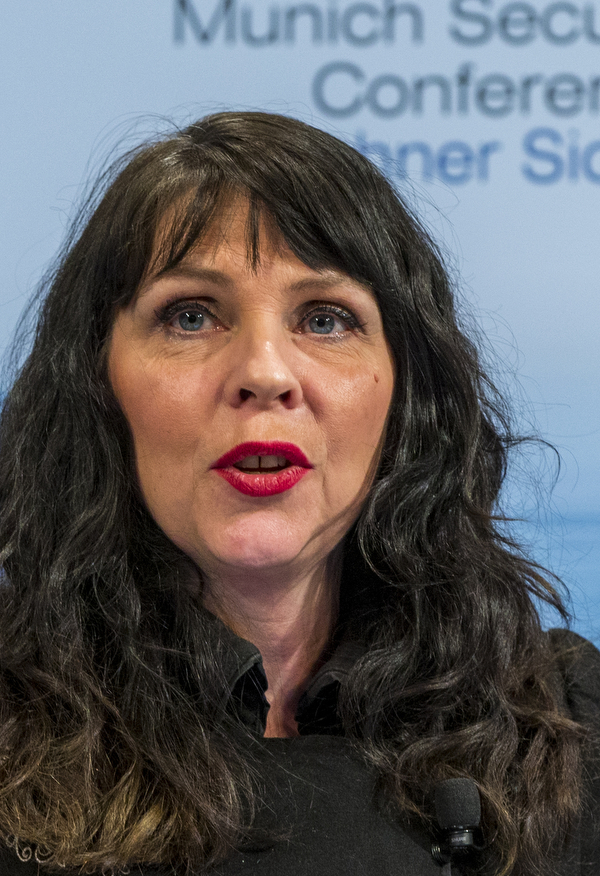
- Birgitta Jónsdóttir during the MSC 2017

Member of Alþingi
- In office 27 April 2013 – 28 October 2017
- Constituency: Southwest

Member of Alþingi
- In office 25 April 2009 – 27 April 2013
- Constituency: Reykjavík South

Personal details
- Born: 17 April 1967 (age 59) Reykjavík, Iceland
- Party: Citizens' Movement (2009); The Movement (2009–2012); Pirate Party (2012–2018)
- Children: 3

Birgitta Jónsdóttir (born 17 April 1967) is an Icelandic politician, anarchist, poet, and activist. She was a Member of the Althing (MP) for the Southwest Constituency from 2013 to 2017, representing the Pirate Party, having been elected at the 2013 election. She was previously an MP for Reykjavík Constituency South from 2009 to 2013. In November 2017, she has announced to retire from politics "for now".

She published her first book of poetry at the age of 22, and later became a web developer. She was a noted Icelandic activist, and took on a number of roles during the protests following the 2008 financial crisis.

She was first elected as an MP representing the Citizens' Movement in the 2009 election. Later in 2009, she left the Citizens' Movement and joined The Movement. She became involved with WikiLeaks during Julian Assange's visit to Iceland in 2010, and helped to produce the Collateral Murder video. Following her time with WikiLeaks, she created the International Modern Media Institute, of which she became executive director in 2011. She was also involved in two court cases in the United States during her parliamentary term, one of which was the high-profile case Hedges vs Obama. In 2012, close to the end of her term, she co-founded the Icelandic Pirate Party, becoming their first MP.

In the 2013 election, Birgitta was elected as a Pirate Party MP, alongside two others. She served as Chairman of the Pirate Party from 2014 to 2015.

== Early life ==
Birgitta was born in Reykjavík on 17 April 1967, the daughter of Icelandic folk singer Bergþóra Árnadóttir (1948–2007). Her father left the family when she was just a baby, and so she was adopted by her mother's new husband, shipowner and fisherman Jón Ólafsson (1940–1987). She completed her primary school education in 1983. Her first love, as a teenager, was Jón Gnarr, who went on to become Mayor of Reykjavík. They "took drugs together, read anarchist literature and planned to start an Icelandic branch of Greenpeace." Her adoptive father, Jón Ólafsson, died of suicide when she was 20 years old by walking into an icy river during a storm.

== Poetry and activism ==
At the age of 20, her first book of poetry, Frostdinglar, was published. From a young age, she sought to combine art and poetry, "by looking holistically at issues artists could bring new perspectives." Therefore, she styles herself as a 'poetician'. Her art has been exhibited on three different continents, she has performed at lectures and festivals around the world, and her work has been published in anthologies, newspapers, magazines, and on TV, radio and the internet. In 1995, her focus shifted to the internet, saying that "I dove into the internet and haven’t been out of there since." In 1996, she organised Iceland's first live stream using CU-SeeMe. In 2002, she edited two anthologies, The Book of Hope and The World Healing Book. She is also a member of the Writers' Union of Iceland (RSÍ), and the founder of Radical Creations and Beyond Borders Press.

In an interview with Take Part, Birgitta described how "after the financial collapse I was one of the very few people that was a known protester." She was therefore asked to coordinate various grassroots organisations and organised a large protest in December 2008. She later became a member of the Academia Group, which talked about what kind of government and constitution Iceland required.

== First parliamentary term, 2009–2013 ==
In the 2009 Iceland parliamentary election, Birgitta was elected as a Member of the Althing for Reykjavík Constituency South, representing the Citizens' Movement. Upon her election, she was appointed as a member of the Foreign Affairs Committee, the Environment and Communications Committee, and the Icelandic delegation to the NATO Parliamentary Assembly. Later, in 2009, she was also appointed as a member of the Parliamentary Review Committee of the SIC Report.

On 14 August 2009, Þráinn Bertelsson left the Citizens' Movement to sit as an Independent, and, on 18 September 2009, the remaining three MPs for the Citizens' Movement (Birgitta, Margrét Tryggvadóttir and Þór Saari) left the party to form their own parliamentary grouping, the Movement.

In 2009, a court injunction prevented broadcasters talking about the recent leak of the details of Kaupthing Bank's loansbook. Live on television, Bogi Ágústsson directed viewers to the WikiLeaks website to see for themselves. This created considerable popularity for WikiLeaks in Iceland, and, shortly after the incident, Julian Assange visited Iceland. During his visit, Birgitta met with him and offered her help. It was agreed that Birgitta should be part of a team to help create a stronger set of free speech laws internationally and, particularly, in Iceland. Birgitta was also a producer of WikiLeaks' Collateral Murder video, released in 2010.

The project for creating stronger free speech laws eventually became known as the International Modern Media Initiative (IMMI), which was proposed in February 2010 with Birgitta being the chief sponsor. It was adopted unanimously by the Althing on 16 June 2010, shortly following the release of the Collateral Murder video. She later split from WikiLeaks, however, saying in September 2010 that "I have strongly urged him to focus on the legalities that he’s dealing with and let some other people carry the torch" following the Swedish police wanting to question Assange over allegations of rape. She spoke to the National Post about WikiLeaks in January 2011, saying: "There is not enough transparency within the organization about decisions and not good enough communication flow."

In 2010, she was appointed as a member of the Foreign Affairs Committee's Working Group on European Affairs and also the EU-Iceland Joint Parliamentary Committee. In October 2011, she attended a meeting of the NATO Parliamentary Assembly in Bucharest, Romania, where she offered criticisms of Lord Jopling's report on cyber security, writing on her blog that "Apparently such criticism is not common here at the assembly on reports."

In 2011, part way through the parliamentary term, she was demoted from full member to observer status in both the Foreign Affairs Committee and their Working Group on European Affairs. She stopped being a member of the Environment and Communications Committee, and instead became a member of both the Judicial Affairs and Education Committee and the Special Committee on the Standing Orders of Althing. From 2011 to 2012, she was the rotating chairman of the Movement's overall party. In 2011, she also became Executive Director of the International Modern Media Institute (IMMI), that the earlier initiative had transitioned into.

In 2012, Birgitta began assisting other The Movement MPs in forming a new political party, Dawn. Dawn was officially formed in March 2012 as a merger between The Movement, the Citizens' Movement and the Liberal Party. However, in July 2012, she changed her attention to forming a Pirate Party in Iceland alongside others, including Smári McCarthy. Speaking to The Grapevine, she said: "I’m often crossing paths with nerds as I’m such a nerd myself. The Pirate Party doesn’t revolve around me. I’m just one of many who are creating the group." The party was officially formed in November 2012, with Birgitta unanimously appointed as the first Chairman.

=== Legal battles ===
In 2011, the US Department of Justice issued a subpoena to Twitter for all of Birgitta's Twitter information dating back to November 2009. In response, Birgitta petitioned a federal appeals court in Virginia to force the Department of Justice to open its files on her to disclose the other internet providers that had also been ordered to submit her private data. In response to the case, the Inter-Parliamentary Union (IPU) issued a resolution in support of Birgitta, including an expression of deep concern "at the efforts made by a State to obtain information about the communications of a member of parliament of another State and the likely consequences of this for members of parliament the world over on their ability to discharge their popular mandate freely."

In 2012, she was a plaintiff in the lawsuit Hedges v. Obama, initiated against the National Defense Authorization Act for Fiscal Year 2012 (NDAA). The NDAA allowed the US government to detain indefinitely those "who are part of or substantially support Al Qaeda, the Taliban or associated forces engaged in hostilities against the United States." Her fellow plaintiffs included Chris Hedges, Noam Chomsky, Daniel Ellsberg, Jennifer Bolen, Alexa O'Brien and Cornel West. Her testament was read by Naomi Wolf in her place in March 2012. In the judgement of the court, Birgitta Jónsdóttir and fellow plaintiff Kai Wargalla presented separate evidence against the NDAA to the other plaintiffs, as neither were US citizens. During the judgement of the district court, according to the Second Circuit Court of Appeals, the "district court found that both Birgitta and Wargalla had an actual fear of detention under Section 1021 and had incurred costs and other present injuries due to this fear." The result of the case was that a New York district court issued an injunction on the detention powers, but, in 2013, this was overturned by the Second Circuit Court of Appeals.

== Second parliamentary term, 2013–2016 ==
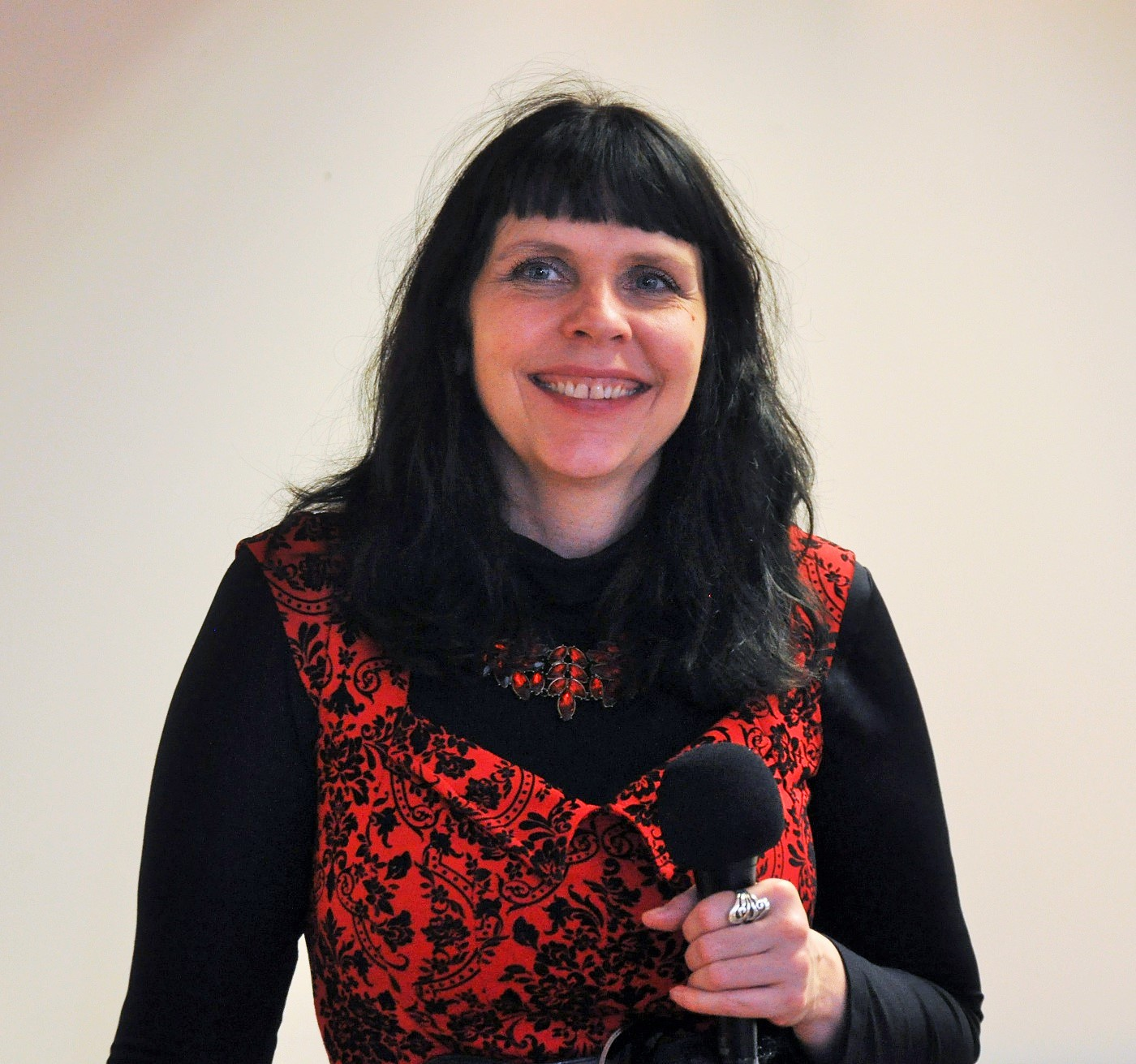
Birgitta Jónsdóttir 2015

In the 2013 Icelandic parliamentary election, Birgitta was elected as a Member of the Althing for Southwest Constituency, this time representing the Pirate Party. She continued as both an observer on the Foreign Affairs Committee and as a member of the EU-Iceland joint Parliamentary Committee, but also became a member of the Icelandic delegation to the Inter-Parliamentary Union (IPU) and of the Constitutional and Supervisory Committee, where she was also appointed as the 2nd Deputy Chairman.

In October 2013, a film was released about Wikileaks, called The Fifth Estate. In it, Birgitta was portrayed by Dutch actress Carice van Houten. During the production of the film, Birgitta advised the director and the scriptwriters, but later said that the "script is very inaccurate in many ways." During an interview with The New Republic, she described how she asked for several scenes to be changed or removed because of their inaccuracies. In December 2013, she was criticised by Wikileaks spokesman Kristinn Hrafnsson for her involvement with the film, and particularly for receiving payment for her consultancy work.

From 2014 to 2015, Birgitta served as the rotating chairman of the Pirate Party. Since April 2015, the Pirate Party has topped the polls in Iceland ahead of the 2017 parliamentary election. Speaking to Quartz, Birgitta said that "I'm very shocked and I don't know how long it will last. I think it's an expression of the lack of faith in the current, traditional parties in power. We are offering them alternative solutions." In February 2016, she announced that she would be standing for a third term, as, according to Iceland Review, "she feels it’s important for the party to have someone on board experienced in working with the ministries and the inner political structure to ensure the effectiveness of the party."

In April 2016, following calls for Prime Minister Sigmundur Davíð Gunnlaugsson's resignation in the wake of the Panama Papers leak, Birgitta said that the Pirates were ready to form part of a new government in the event of a snap election. For about a year before April 2016, the Pirates were Iceland's most popular party, with varying support ranging from 36%-43% support from voters.

== Third parliamentary term, 2016–2017 ==
In the 2016 Icelandic parliamentary election where the Pirate Party won 10 seats with 15% of the vote.

In the run up to election Birgitta was accused of trying to manipulate the Pirate primary in the NV election district including by trying to slander the top list seat Þórðar Pétursson and asking other candidates to step down and pushing for the NV list to be invalided to get Gunnar Ingiberg Jónsson in the top seat.

== Personal life ==
Birgitta was married to Charles Egill Hirt (1964-1993), who went missing in June 1993, aged 29. His body was found five years after his disappearance. With Hirt, Birgitta had one son, Neptunús, born in 1991.

Birgitta married Australian Daniel Johnson in 2009. They were married for five years and she had a son with him, Delphin, who was born in Melbourne in 2000.

== See also ==
- List of Icelandic writers
- Icelandic literature
