= Skúli Helgason =

Icelandic politician (born 1965)

Reykjavík City Councilor
- Incumbent
- Assumed office June 2014

Member of the Althing
- In office 1 Júní 2009 – 1 May 2013

Personal details
- Born: 15 April 1965 (age 61) Reykjavík, Iceland
- Party: Social Democratic Alliance
- Spouse: Anna-Lind Pétursdóttir
- Children: 5

Skúli Helgason (born 15 April 1965) was a member of parliament of the Althing, the Icelandic parliament. He is a member of the Social Democratic Alliance.
