= Taxation in Iceland =

Taxes in Iceland are levied by the state and the municipalities. Property rights are strong and Iceland is one of the few countries where they are applied to fishery management. Taxpayers pay various subsidies to each other, similar to European countries that are welfare states, but the spending is less than in most European countries. Despite low tax rates in relation to European welfare states, overall taxation and consumption is still much higher than in countries such as Ireland. Employment regulations are relatively flexible. The tax is collected by Skatturinn, the Iceland Revenue and Customs Agency and is due in March each year.

== Income tax ==
Income tax is deducted at the source, which is called pay-as-you-earn (PAYE). Each employee has a personal tax credit of 53,895 ISK per month (2018) which is deducted from calculated taxes. Unused credit may be transferred to one's spouse. Mandatory employee pension insurance is 4% of gross income (employer provides a minimum of 8%) and another 4% of total income may be deducted for private pension insurance (if so, the employer is obliged to pay additional 2% premium for the benefit of the employees) .

Before the year 2016 Iceland used a 3-tier income tax system base on the individual's level of income. Since 2016, Iceland uses a 2-tier system.

	Monthly consideration	Annual consideration	Rate	Personal monthly tax credit	Personal annual tax credit
2015	First 336,035 ISK	Under 4,032,420 ISK	37.13%	51,920 ISK	623,040 ISK
	Between 336,036 and 836,990 ISK	Between 4,032,432 and 10,043,880 ISK	38.35%	51,920 ISK	623,040 ISK
	Above 836,990 ISK	Over 10,043,880 ISK	46.25%	51,920 ISK	623,040 ISK
2017	First 834,707 ISK	Under 10,016,484 ISK	36.94%	52,900 ISK	634,800 ISK
	Above 834,707 ISK	Over 10,016,484 ISK	46.24%	52,900 ISK	634,800 ISK
2018	First 893,713 ISK	Under 10,724,556 ISK	36.94%	53,895 ISK	646,740 ISK
	Above 893,714 ISK	Over 10,724,556 ISK	46.24%	53,895 ISK	646,740 ISK

In 2018 income tax consisted as follows

2018 income tax structure
	Percent
National tax	22.50 and 31.80
Municipal tax (13.7% - 14.52%)	14.44
Total	36.94 - 46.24

If the annual income of an individual is below 1,750,782 ISK there must not be any income or municipal tax paid. The annual personal tax credit (646,740 ISK, 2018) equals to non-taxation of the first 1,750,782 ISK

Children under 16 years must pay 6% income tax if their annual income exceeds 180,000 ISK.

== Tax on capital gains ==
Individuals in Iceland pay 22% capital gains tax (2018)

Tax on capital gains development
	2016	2017	2018
Capital gains tax	18%	20%	22%

== Corporate tax ==
The corporate income tax rate in Iceland stands at 20% since 2011, one of the lowest in the world. These 20% stand for limited liability companies and limited partnership companies. Corporate income tax for other types of legal entities (e.g. partnerships) is assessed at a rate of 37.6%. Non-resident corporations doing business in Iceland are subject to the same rate as applies to resident corporations.

Corporate income tax rate

== Value-added tax ==
The standard rate of value-added tax is 24%. A number of specific consumer goods and services are subject to a reduced VAT rate of 11% (e.g. food, hotels, newspapers, books, and energy like electricity, heating and fuel).

== Residence in Iceland ==
For taxation purposes a resident of Iceland is anyone who is present in Iceland for 183 days during any 12-month period. An individual that stays in Iceland for longer than 183 days is considered to be a resident from the day of arrival. After leaving Iceland tax liability of an individual ends.

Non-residents staying in Iceland for a period shorter than 183 days are subject to national income tax on any income. They are also subject to municipal income tax as well as residents.
