= Politics of Iceland =

Political system of Iceland Íslensk stjórnmál (Icelandic)
- Coat of arms of Iceland
- Polity type: Parliamentary republic
- Constitution: Constitution of Iceland

Legislative branch
- Name: Althing
- Type: Unicameral
- Meeting place: Alþingishúsið, Reykjavík
- Presiding officer: Þórunn Sveinbjarnardóttir, Speaker of the Althing
- Appointer: Direct election

Executive branch
- Head of state
- Title: President of Iceland
- Currently: Halla Tómasdóttir
- Appointer: Direct election
- Head of government
- Title: Prime Minister of Iceland
- Currently: Kristrún Frostadóttir
- Cabinet
- Name: Cabinet of Iceland
- Current cabinet: Cabinet of Kristrún Frostadóttir
- Leader: Prime Minister
- Headquarters: Reykjavík
- Ministries: 12 Ministries

Judicial branch
- Name: Judiciary of Iceland
- Supreme Court of Iceland
- Chief judge: Benedikt Bogason
- Seat: Supreme Court Building

The politics of Iceland take place in the framework of a parliamentary representative democratic republic, whereby the president is the head of state, while the prime minister of Iceland serves as the head of government in a multi-party system. Executive power is exercised by the government. Legislative power is vested in both the government and the parliament, the Althing. The judiciary is independent of the executive and the legislature.

Iceland is arguably the world's oldest assembly democracy, and has been rated as a "full democracy" in 2021.

== Executive branch ==
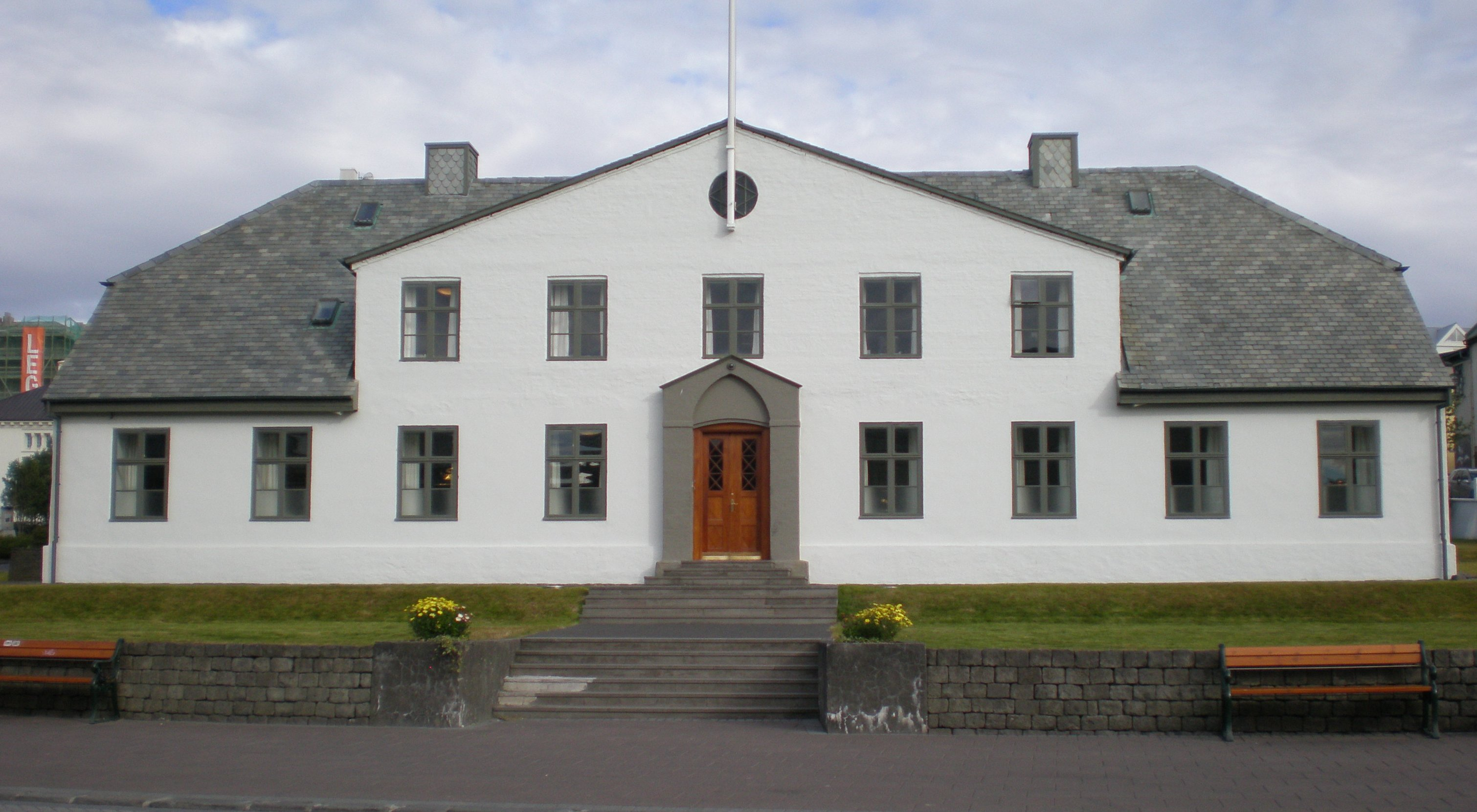
Cabinet of Iceland, seat of executive branch

Main office-holders
Office	Name	Party	Since
President	Halla Tómasdóttir	Independent	1 August 2024
Prime Minister	Kristrún Frostadóttir	Social Democratic Alliance	21 December 2024

Elected to a four-year term, the President has limited powers and is poised in a largely ceremonial office that serves as a diplomat and figurehead. On 1 August 2024, Halla Tómasdóttir was elected as the current President.

The prime minister and cabinet exercise most executive functions. The head of government is the prime minister, who, together with the cabinet, takes care of the executive part of government. The cabinet is appointed by the president after general elections to Althing; however, this process is usually conducted by the leaders of the political parties, who decide among themselves after discussions which parties can form the cabinet and how its seats are to be distributed (under the condition that it has majority support in Althing). Only when the party leaders are unable to reach a conclusion by themselves in reasonable time does the president exercise this power and appoint the cabinet themselves. This has never happened since the republic was founded in 1944, but in 1942 the regent of the country (Sveinn Björnsson, who had been installed in that position by the Althing in 1941) appointed a non-parliamentary government. The regent had, for all practical purposes, the position of a president, and Sveinn in fact became the country's first president in 1944. The governments of Iceland have almost always been coalitions with two or more parties involved because no single political party has received a majority of seats in the Althing during Iceland's republican period. The extent of the political powers possessed by the office of the president is disputed by legal scholars in Iceland; several provisions of the constitution appear to give the president some important powers but other provisions and traditions suggest differently.

The president is elected every four years (last 2024), the cabinet is elected every four years (last 2021) and town council elections are held every four years (last 2022).

== Legislative branch ==
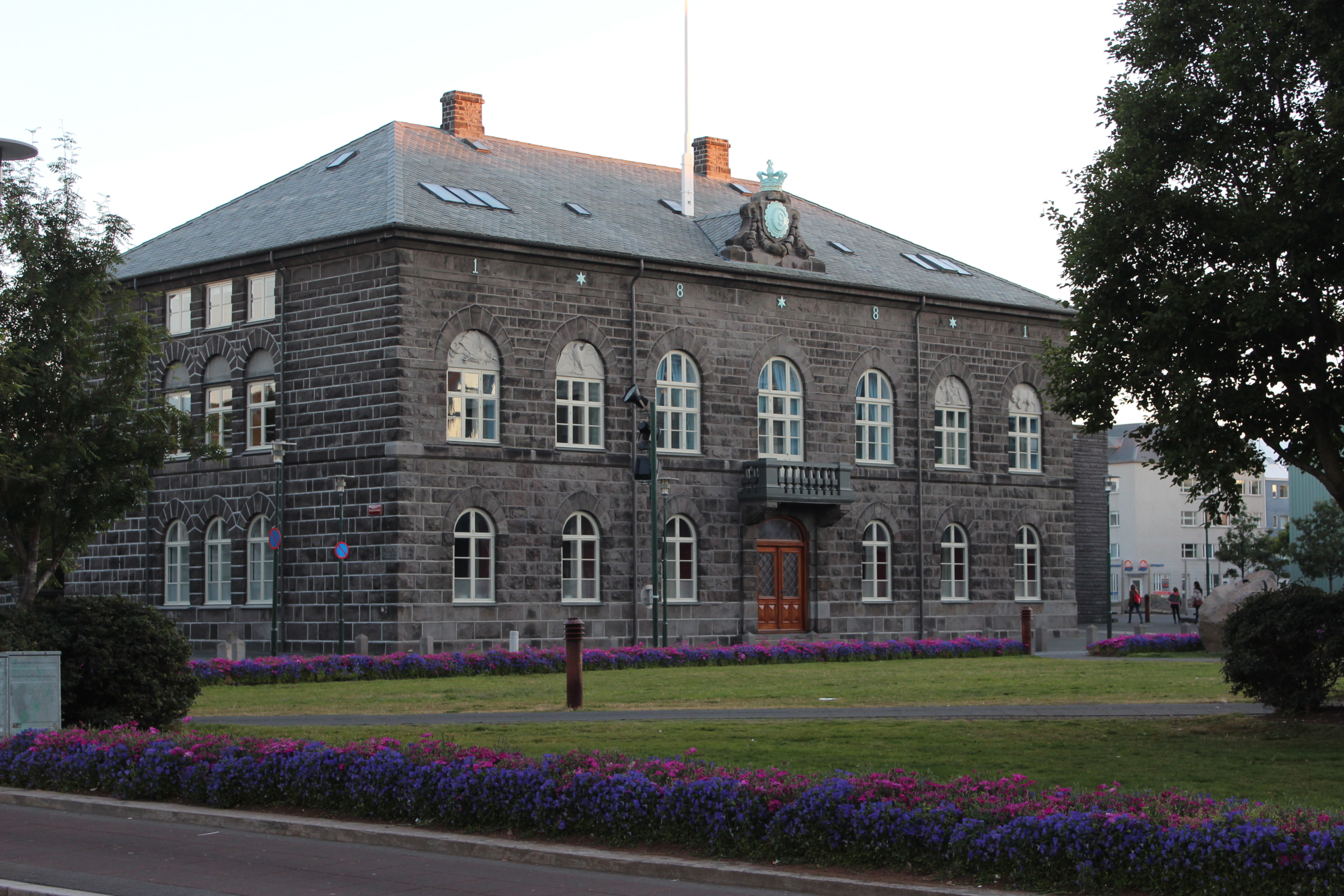
Parliament of Iceland, seat of legislative branch.

The modern parliament, called the "Althing" or "Alþingi", was founded in 1845 as an advisory body to the Danish king. It was widely seen as a re-establishment of the assembly founded in 930 in the Commonwealth period and suspended in 1799. The Althing is composed of 63 members, elected every 4 years unless it is dissolved sooner. Suffrage for presidential and parliamentary elections is 18 years of age and is universal. Members of the Althing are elected on the basis of proportional representation from six constituencies. Until 1991, membership of the Althing was divided between a lower and upper house but this was changed to a fully unicameral system.

== Political parties and the elections ==
After four four-year terms as the world's first elected woman president, the widely popular Vigdís Finnbogadóttir chose not to run for re-election in 1996. More than 86% of voters turned out in the 29 June 1996 presidential elections to give former leftist party chairman Ólafur Ragnar Grímsson a 41% plurality and relatively comfortable 12% victory margin over the closest of three other candidates. Traditionally limited to 6–12 weeks, Iceland's campaign season was marked by several intensely personal attacks on Ólafur Ragnar, a former finance minister who tried to erase memories of his controversial support of inflationary policies and opposition to the U.S. military presence at the NATO base in Keflavík. Ólafur Ragnar successfully used his largely ceremonial office to promote Icelandic trade abroad and family values at home. The most recent presidential elections took place on 27 June 2020.

The most recent parliamentary elections took place on 25 September 2021. A three-party coalition was formed following the 2017 parliamentary elections by the Independence Party (Sjálfstæðisflokkurinn), the Progressive Party (Framsóknarflokkurinn) and the Left-Green Movement (Vinstrihreyfingin – grænt framboð). These political parties were again the three largest in Iceland after the latest elections and subsequently continued the coalition for another term. This was the first time since 2009 in which existing coalition is renewed in Iceland. A total of 203,898 votes were cast consulting 80.1% of the 254,681 electorates.

== Political history ==
=== 1990s ===
In losing four seats in April 1995 parliamentary elections, the IP and SDP (so-called Viðey government) mustered a simple majority in the 63-seat Althing. However, Prime Minister and IP leader Davíð Oddsson chose the resurgent Progressive Party (PP) as a more conservative partner to form a stronger and more stable majority with 40 seats. Splintered by factionalism over the economy and Iceland's role in the European Union (EU), the SDP also suffered from being the only party to support Iceland's EU membership application.

=== 2000s–2010s ===
The beginning of the millennium saw a merger of all the left parties to form the Social Democratic Alliance. Some members chose to join another new left party instead, the Left-Green Movement. After the PP's loss in the 2007 elections its longstanding alliance with the IP ended despite still being able to form a majority. Instead, the IP's leader Geir Haarde chose a stronger but somewhat unstable coalition with the Social Democrats (the Þingvellir government).

Geir's administration fell apart in January 2009 and he called for an early election before standing down as party leader. The Social Democrats subsequently formed an interim government with the LGM. In the resulting election, Jóhanna Sigurðardóttir's administration prevailed, the first time Icelanders voted for a majority left-wing government.

After the 2008 financial crisis, there has been an increasing fractionalization of the Icelandic party system. The increase in the number of parties has made it harder for coalition governments to form. What's more, since the initial resignation of the government in January 2009 after the banking collapse, revelations of subsequent political scandals have resulted in the government collapsing in 2016, following the Panama Papers, and again in 2017, following revelations of impropriety within the ranks of the political class; both instances culminated in anti-government protests being staged. Organized protests challenging political corruption since 2008 have therefore come to stress the necessity for the new Icelandic constitution to be enshrined into law, which was originally co-drafted by the 2009 leftist government and select members of the public .

=== 2020s ===
After the 2021 parliamentary election, the new government was, just like the previous government, a tri-party coalition of the Independence Party, the Progressive Party and the Left-Green Movement, headed by Prime Minister Katrín Jakobsdóttir. In April 2024, Bjarni Benediktsson of the Independence party succeeded Katrín Jakobsdóttir as prime minister. In November 2024, centre-left Social Democratic Alliance became the biggest party in a snap election, meaning Social Democratic Kristrun Frostadottir became the next Prime Minister of Iceland.

== Judicial branch ==
The judiciary consists of the Supreme Court (Hæstiréttur) and district courts. Justices are appointed for life by the minister of justice. The Constitution protects the judiciary from infringement by the other two branches.

== Administrative divisions ==
Iceland is divided into 8 regions, which are further subdivided into 77 municipalities.

Until 1988, Iceland was divided in 23 counties (sýslur, singular sýsla) and 14 independent towns* (kaupstaðir, singular kaupstaður); Akranes*, Akureyri*, Árnessýsla, Austur-Barðastrandarsýsla, Austur-Húnavatnssýsla, Austur-Skaftafellssýsla, Borgarfjarðarsýsla, Dalasýsla, Eyjafjarðarsýsla, Gullbringusýsla, Hafnarfjörður*, Húsavík*, Ísafjörður*, Keflavík*, Kjósarsýsla, Kópavogur*, Mýrasýsla, Neskaupstaður*, Norður-Ísafjarðarsýsla, Norður-Múlasýsla, Norður-Þingeyjarsýsla, Ólafsfjörður*, Rangárvallasýsla, Reykjavík*, Sauðárkrókur*, Seyðisfjörður*, Siglufjörður*, Skagafjarðarsýsla, Snæfellsnes- og Hnappadalssýsla, Strandasýsla, Suður-Múlasýsla, Suður-Þingeyjarsýsla, Vestmannaeyjar*, Vestur-Barðastrandarsýsla, Vestur-Húnavatnssýsla, Vestur-Ísafjarðarsýsla, Vestur-Skaftafellssýsla

== International organization participation ==
Arctic Council, Australia Group, BIS, CBSS, CE, EAPC, EBRD, ECE, EFTA, FAO, IAEA, IBRD, ICAO, ICCt, ICC, ICRM, IDA, IEA (observer), IFC, IFRCS, IHO, ILO, IMF, IMO, Inmarsat, Intelsat, Interpol, IOC, ISO, ITU, ITUC, NATO, NC, NEA, NIB, OECD, OPCW, OSCE, PCA, UN, UNCTAD, UNESCO, UNMIK, UNU, UPU, WCO, WEU (associate), WHO, WIPO, WMO, WTrO

== Opinion polls ==
A 2024 Gallup opinion poll found the main political issues in Iceland were health care, economy, housing and education.

== See also ==
- List of Icelandic ministries
- election history
- Icelandic constitutional reform, 2010–13
