= Eygló Harðardóttir =

Icelandic politician (born 1972)

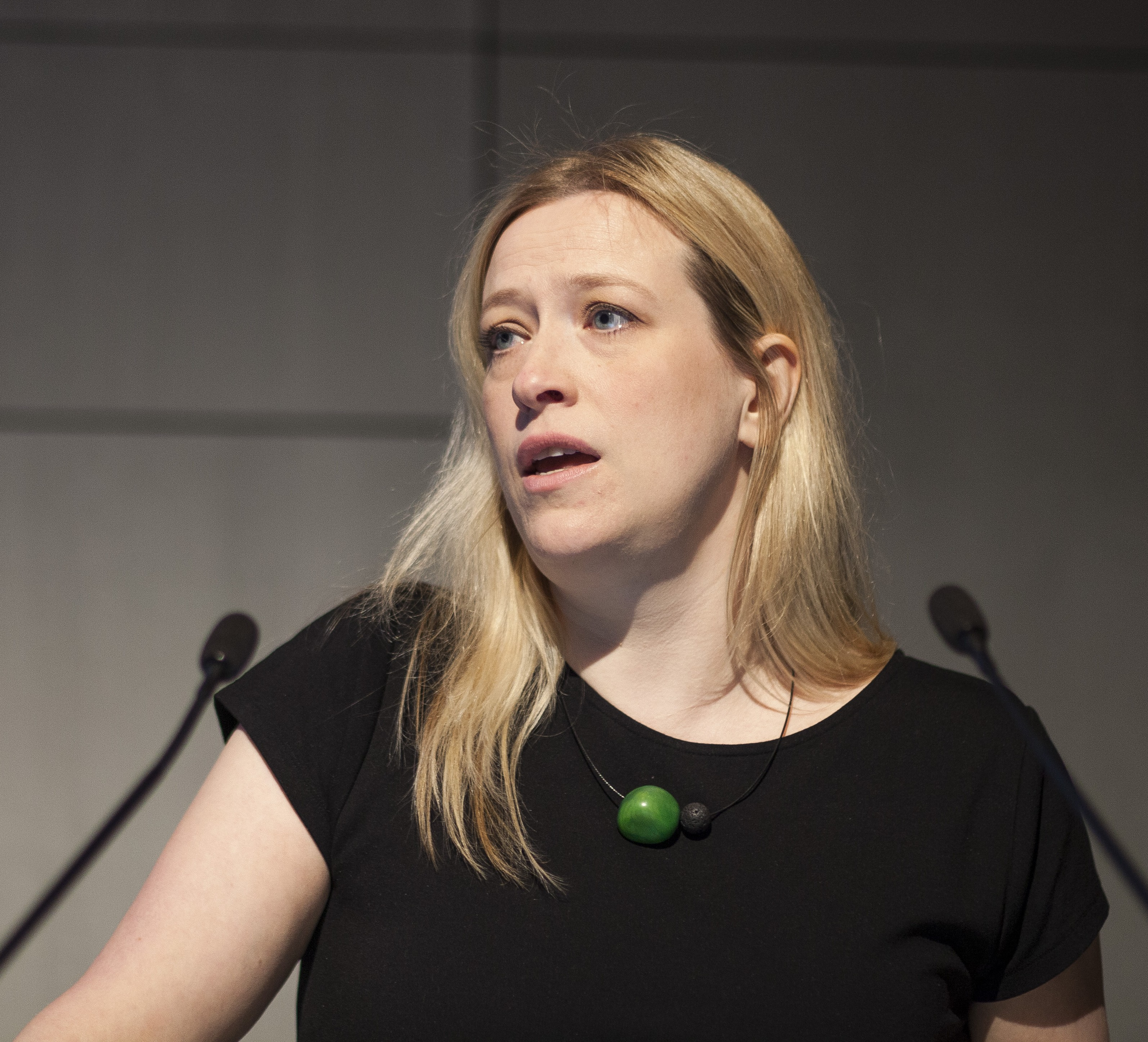

Minister for Social Affairs and Housing
- In office 23 May 2013 – 11 January 2017
- Prime Minister: Sigmundur Davíð Gunnlaugsson
- Preceded by: Guðbjartur Hannesson

Personal details
- Born: 12 December 1972 (age 53) Reykjavík, Iceland
- Party: Progressive Party
- Education: Stockholm University; University of Iceland

Eygló Harðardóttir (born 12 December 1972) is an Icelandic politician and former cabinet member. She served as Iceland's Minister of Social Affairs and Housing from 2013 to 2017. She has a degree in art from the Stockholm University and has studied economics at the University of Iceland. She became active in local politics in 2003 for Framsóknarflokkurinn, a Nordic agrarian centre-right party. In 2008 she was elected as a representative to the Althing, the Icelandic parliament.

Political offices
Preceded by Guðbjartur Hannesson	Minister for Social Affairs and Housing; 2013–2017	Succeeded by Þorsteinn Víglundsson
