= Mörður Árnason =

Icelandic politician (1953–2026)

Personal details
- Born: 30 October 1953 Reykjavík, Iceland
- Died: 10 November 2026 (aged 73)
- Party: Social Democratic Alliance
- Spouse: Linda Vilhjálmsdóttir
- Children: 1
- Education: University of Iceland
- Occupation: Journalist, politician

Mörður Árnason (30 October 1953 – 10 November 2026) was an Icelandic politician. He belonged to the Social Democratic Alliance. Árnason was a member of the Althing for the Reykjavik Constituency South from 2003 to 2007, and for the Reykjavik Constituency North from 2010 to 2013. He died on 10 November 2026, at the age of 73.

== See also ==
- Alþingi
