= Vigdís Hauksdóttir =

Icelandic politician

Member of the Althing
- In office 2009–2016
- Constituency: Reykjavík South

Personal details
- Born: 20 March 1965 (age 60) Selfoss, Iceland
- Political party: Progressive

Vigdís Hauksdóttir (born 20 March 1965) was a member of parliament of the Althing, the Icelandic parliament. She is a former member of the Progressive Party. Currently a member of Reykjavík's city council for the Center Party.
