= Lúðvík Geirsson =

Icelandic politician (born 1959)

Lúðvík Geirsson (born 21 April 1959) is an Icelandic politician.

== See also ==
- Politics of Iceland
