= Guðfríður Lilja Grétarsdóttir =

Icelandic politician (born 1972)

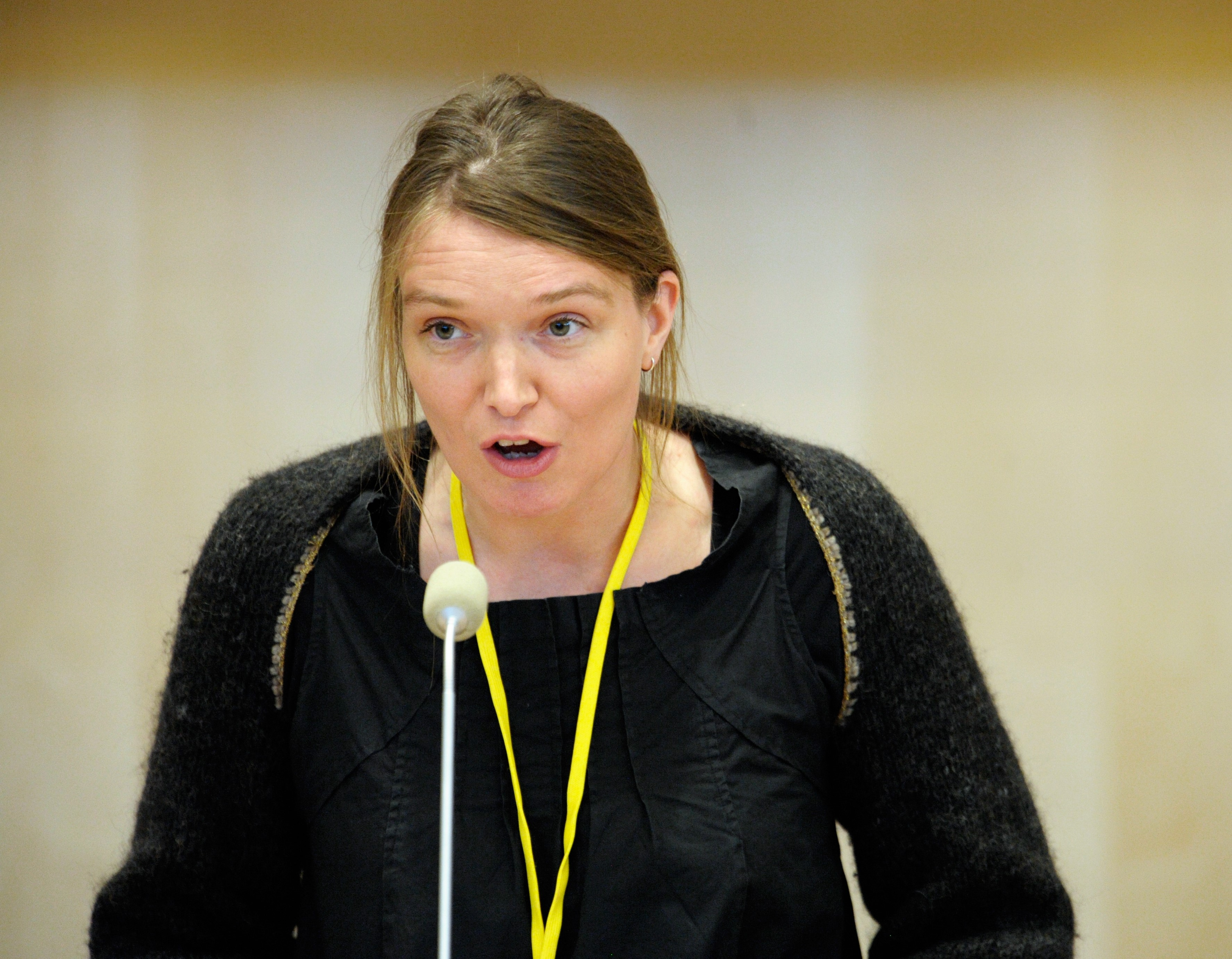
- Guðfríður Lilja Grétarsdóttir in Stockholm in 2009.

Personal information
- Born: 10 January 1972 (age 54)

Chess career
- Country: Iceland
- Title: Woman International Master (2004)
- Peak rating: 2071 (January 2004)

Guðfríður Lilja Grétarsdóttir (born 10 January 1972) is an Icelandic politician, and a member of Althing. She is also a chess Woman International Master (WIM), and an 11-time Icelandic national woman champion (first time at the age of 13).
