= Ásmundur Einar Daðason =

Icelandic politician (born 1982)

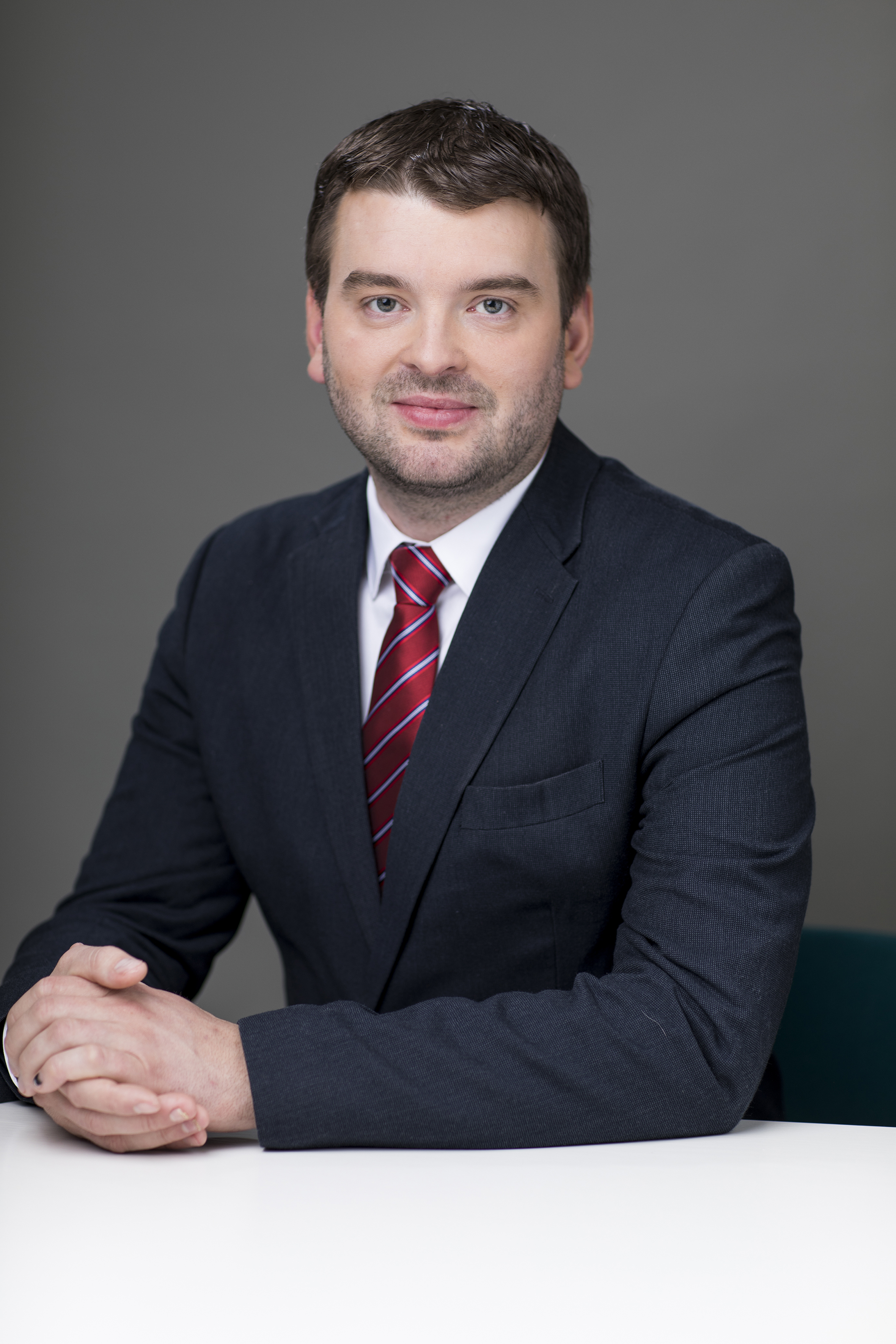
- Ásmundur Einar in 2016

Minister of Education and Children's Affairs
- In office 28 November 2021 – 21 December 2024
- Prime Minister: Katrín Jakobsdóttir; Bjarni Benediktsson
- Preceded by: Lilja Dögg Alfreðsdóttir (Education, Science, and Culture)
- Succeeded by: Ásthildur Lóa Þórsdóttir

Minister of Social Affairs and Children
- In office 30 November 2017 – 28 November 2021
- Prime Minister: Katrín Jakobsdóttir
- Preceded by: Þorsteinn Víglundsson
- Succeeded by: Guðmundur Ingi Guðbrandsson (Social Affairs and the Labour Market)

Personal details
- Born: 29 October 1982 (age 43) Reykjavík, Iceland
- Party: Progressive
- Spouse: Sunna Birna Helgadóttir
- Education: Agricultural University of Iceland

Ásmundur Einar Daðason (born 29 October 1982) is an Icelandic politician. He served as a member of the Althing for the Northwest Constituency from 2009 to 2016, initially representing the Left-Green Movement (VG) and later the centrist Progressive Party. After a hiatus, he returned to the Althing in 2017. Additionally, he has held leadership positions within the organization Heimssyn, which advocates against Iceland's membership in the EU.

On 30 November 2017 he assumed the role of Minister of Social Affairs and Equality. On 28 November 2021 he was appointed Minister of Education and Children.

== Career ==
=== Minister of Social Affairs and Children ===
Ásmundur Einar was appointed Minister of Social Affairs and Children in the Jakobsdottir cabinet after government negotiations following the 2017 election. Following the 2021 election, he was appointed Minister of Education and Children.

After taking office as a minister in 2017, Ásmundur Einar declared that his main emphasis as a minister would be services provided for children. He stated that he wished to make large-scale changes in the systems that provide services to children in Iceland. On 31 December 2018 he changed the ministerial title to reflect his focus on children's rights and became Minister of Social Affairs and Children, the first minister for children in Iceland. In 2020, in a personal interview with Morgunblaðið, Ásmundur Einar described his youth and upbringing and the effects that experience had had on his adult life. Based on that experience, Ásmundur Einar emphasised his first hand knowledge of how it feels to be a child in an environment where not everything is up to par and assistance is needed.

In 2020, Ásmundur Einar presented a bill to the Icelandic Parliament on the Integration of Services in the Interest of Children's Prosperity. The bill was accompanied by two other bills, one on the National Agency for Children and Families and the other on the National Supervisory Authority for Welfare for Integrating Services in the Interest of Children's Prosperity. The two are new institutions, founded on the basis of two currently operating institutions, and their role would be to oversee the implementation and activities based on the new law on the Integration of Services in the Interest of Children's Prosperity. The bill was passed into law in the spring of 2021 and took effect on 1 January 2022.

On 13 January 2021, Ásmundur Einar announced that he would run for Parliament in Reykjavík North Constituency, after serving four terms for Northwest Constituency. In September 2021, he was elected into Parliament for that constituency and appointed minister in November of the same year.

Political offices
Preceded by Þorsteinn Víglundsson	Minister of Social Affairs and Children; 2017–present	Succeeded by Incumbent
