= Valgerður Bjarnadóttir =

Icelandic politician

Member of the Althing
- In office 2009–2016
- Constituency: Reykjavík North

Personal details
- Born: 13 January 1950 (age 75) Reykjavík, Iceland
- Political party: Social Democratic Alliance

Valgerður Bjarnadóttir (born 13 January 1950) is an Icelandic politician of the Social Democratic Alliance.
