= Helgi Hjörvar =

Icelandic politician (born 1967)

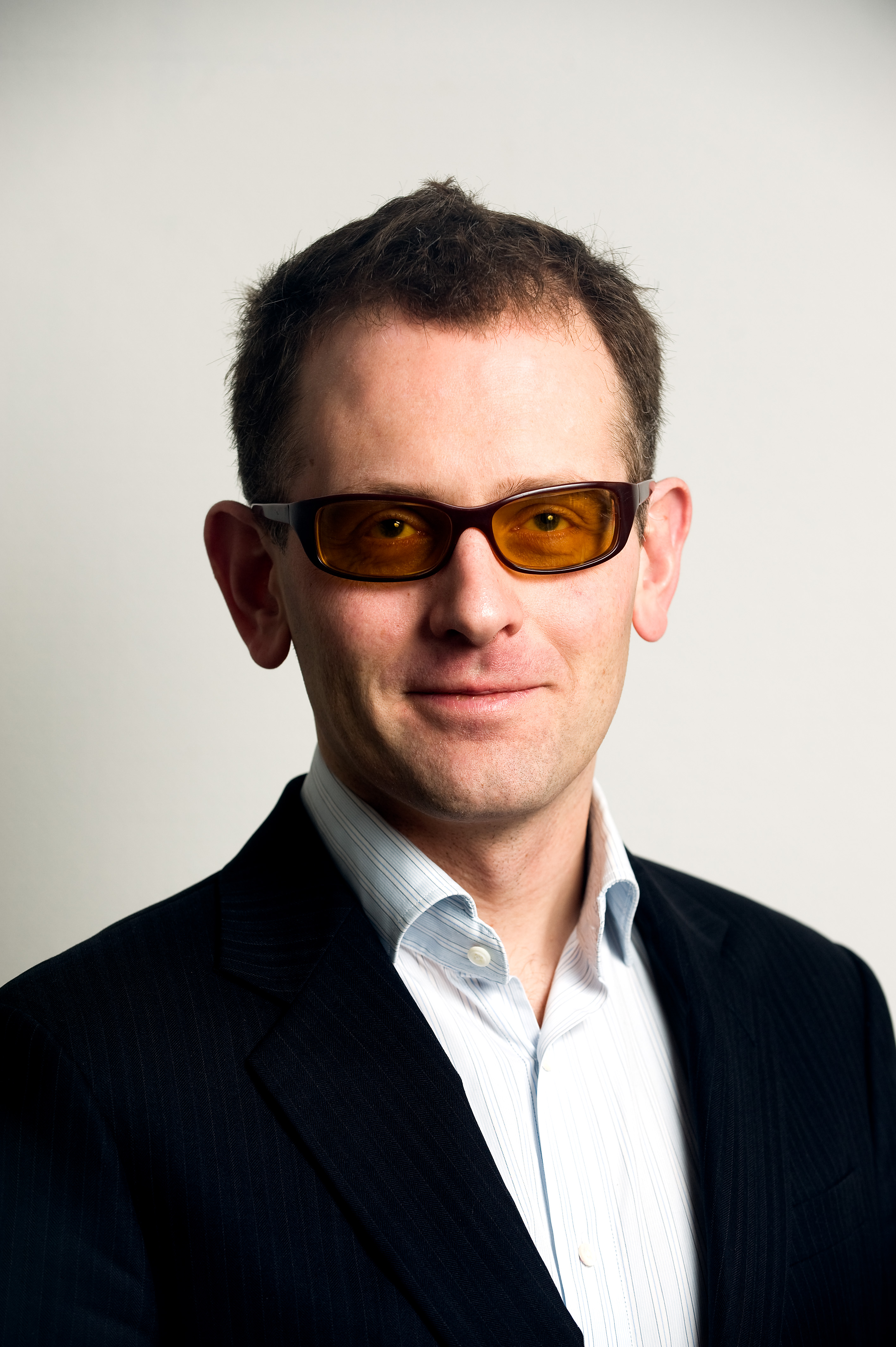

Helgi Hjörvar (born 9 June 1967 in Reykjavík) is an Icelandic politician. He served as President of the Nordic Council in 2010.
