= Sigríður Ingibjörg Ingadóttir =

Icelandic economist and politician

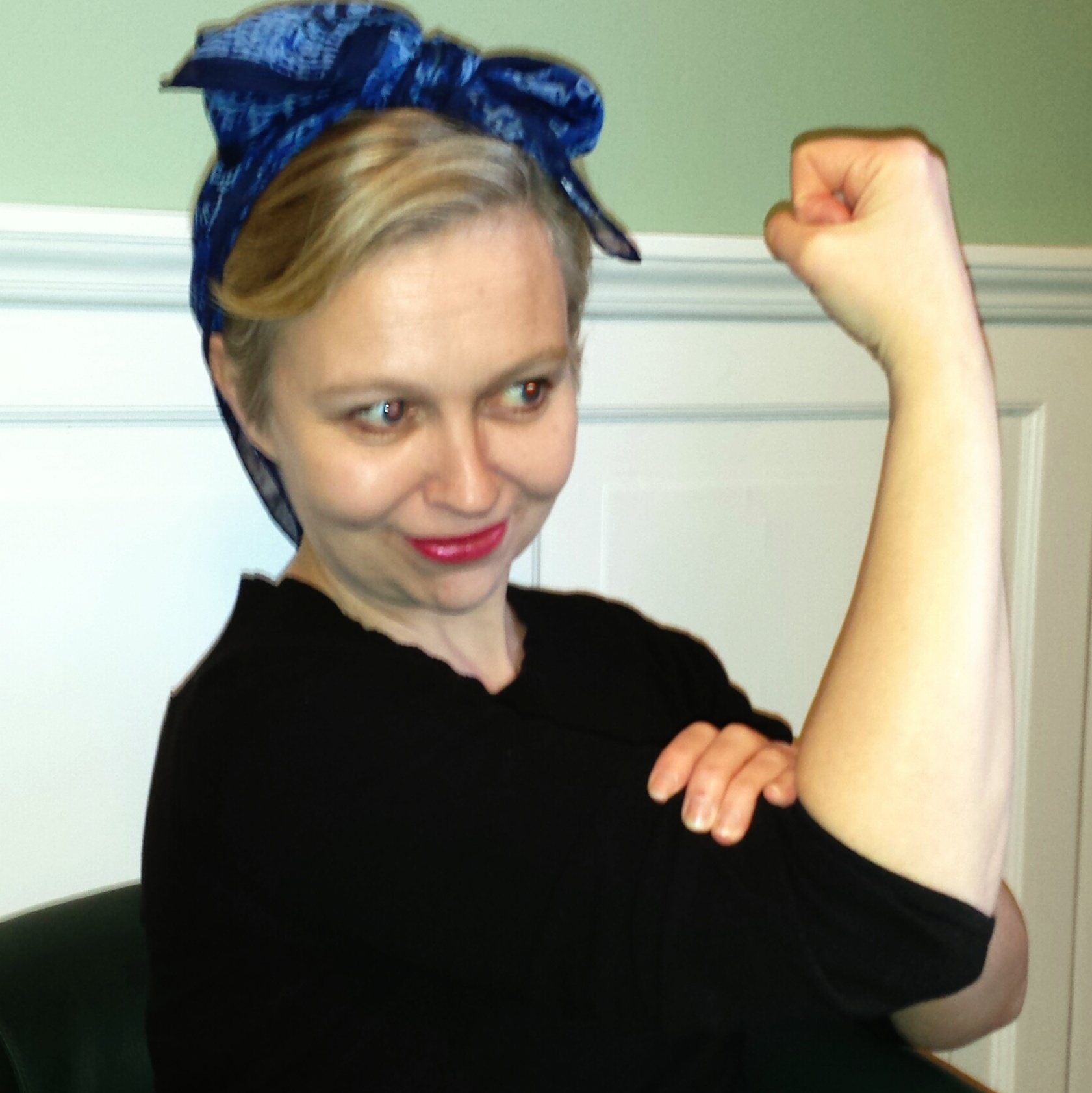
- Sigríður Ingibjörg Ingadóttir posing as Rosie the Riveter (2014)

Member of the Althing
- In office 2009–2016
- Constituency: Reykjavík South

Personal details
- Born: 29 May 1968 (age 57) Reykjavík, Iceland
- Party: Social Democratic Alliance

Sigríður Ingibjörg Ingadóttir (born 29 May 1968) is an Icelandic economist and politician. She is a former member of parliament of the Althing and a former member of the board of the National Bank of Iceland. She represents the Social Democratic Alliance and is a previous member of the Women's List, which merged into SDA in 2000. She challenged party chairman Árni Páll Árnason for the leadership at SDAs annual conference in 2015, but lost by a single vote.
