= Róbert Marshall =

Icelandic politician (born 1971)

Róbert Marshall (born 31 May 1971) is an Icelandic politician. In April 2009, he was elected as a Member of the Althing for the Reykjavik Constituency South, representing the Social Democratic Alliance (Samfylkingin). On 12 October 2012 he decided to leave the party, in order to become a member and top list election candidate for the newly founded party Bright Future in Reykjavik Constituency South.

During his elected term from 2009–13, he worked as a member of the Committee on the Environment, Committee on Fisheries and Agriculture, Committee on General affairs, Committee on Transport and Communications, and was a part of the Icelandic delegation to the OSCE Parliamentary Assembly.
