= 2009 Icelandic parliamentary election =

- 25 April 2009
- All 63 seats in the Althing; 32 seats needed for a majority
- Turnout: 85.14%
Party	Leader	Vote %	Seats	+/–
Social Democratic	Jóhanna Sigurðardóttir	29.79	20	+2
Independence	Bjarni Benediktsson	23.70	16	−9
Left-Green	Steingrímur J. Sigfússon	21.68	14	+5
Progressive	Sigmundur Davíð Gunnlaugsson	14.80	9	+2
Citizens' Movement	No designated leader	7.22	4	New
This lists parties that won seats. See the complete results below.
Results by constituency
Prime Minister before	Prime Minister after election
Jóhanna Sigurðardóttir; Social Democratic	Jóhanna Sigurðardóttir; Social Democratic

Snap parliamentary elections were held in Iceland on 25 April 2009, following strong pressure from the public as a result of the Icelandic financial crisis. The Social Democratic Alliance and the Left-Green Movement, which formed the outgoing coalition government under Prime Minister Jóhanna Sigurðardóttir, both made gains and formed an overall majority of seats in the Althing. The Progressive Party also made gains, and the new Citizens' Movement, formed after the January 2009 protests, won four seats. The big loser was the Independence Party, which had been in power for 18 years until January 2009; it lost nine seats as its vote share was reduced by around a third, meaning it was not the most voted-for party for the first time since 1937

== Background ==
There had been weekly protests in front of the Althing since the collapse of Iceland's three commercial banks in October 2008. These protests intensified with the return of the Althing from Christmas recess on 20 January 2009. Three days later, Prime Minister Geir Haarde of the Independence Party announced that he was withdrawing from politics for health reasons (he had been diagnosed with esophageal cancer), and promised early elections for 9 May. However, the Independence Party wished to retain the Prime Minister's post, which proved unacceptable to their coalition partners the Social Democratic Alliance: the government collapsed on 26 January 2009.

After consultations with all the political parties represented in the Althing, the President asked the Social Democratic Alliance to form a new government. This proved to be a minority coalition with the Left-Green Movement, with the support of the Progressive Party and the Liberal Party, which was sworn in on 1 February. Former Social Affairs Minister Jóhanna Sigurðardóttir became prime minister.

The date of the elections was one of the agreements between the coalition partners. The Social Democrats preferred 9 May, while the Left-Greens wanted elections in early April: the intermediate position of the Progressive Party, 25 April, was adopted. The three parties also agree to convene a constitutional assembly to discuss changes to the Constitution. There was no agreement on the question of an early referendum on prospective EU membership, an issue which divided the coalition partners.

=== Parties ===
The Progressive Party was the first of the historic parties to change leadership after the 2008 financial crisis, when Guðni Ágústsson resigned as both party leader and Althing member on 17 November 2008. Sigmundur Davíð Gunnlaugsson was elected party chairman on 18 January 2009, despite not being a member of the Althing at the time. One of Sigmundur Davíð's first actions as party leader was to call for early elections and to offer the support of the party's seven Althing members to an interim coalition of the Social Democratic Alliance and the Left-Green Movement.

Independence Party chairman Geir Haarde announced his retirement from politics on 23 January 2009, revealing that he had been diagnosed with esophageal cancer which required urgent treatment. He was succeeded by Bjarni Benediktsson at the party's convention on 29 March 2009. The party also proposed to call for two referendums on the EU – one on starting entry talks (which could be held by summer 2010), and another on membership after negotiations are over.

Social Democrat leader Ingibjörg Sólrún Gísladóttir had also been unwell since September 2008 with a benign brain tumour which had kept her out of the public eye for much of the financial crisis. Although initially she had planned to remain in control of the party while fellow Social Democrat Jóhanna Sigurðardóttir served as prime minister, Ingibjörg Sólrún announced on 8 March 2009 that she could not guarantee that her health was good enough to continue to serve the public. Jóhanna had previously stated she did not want to become party leader, but changed her mind in mid-March and announced she would stand for party leadership, citing strong encouragement from many party members as the reason. She was elected, as expected, with a strong majority of 97% of the vote at the party congress of 27–29 March 2009.

Two new parties were formed in the aftermath of the January protests: the Citizens' Movement (Borgarahreyfingin) and the Democratic Movement (Lýðræðishreyfingin). Both contested all six constituencies in the 2009 elections. A third new party, L-List of Sovereignty Supporters (L-listi fullveldissinna), withdrew its candidacy on 3 April. The Icelandic Movement – Living Land (Íslandshreyfingin – lifandi land), which had unsuccessfully contested the 2007 election on a green platform, merged into the Social Democratic Alliance at the March 2009 party congress.

=== Campaign ===
Just a week before the election, the Independence Party announced that its party committee on Europe had decided to call for steps to adopt the euro as Iceland's currency (with the help of the IMF). Shortly before the election, Johanna Sigurðardóttir stated that her priority, if returned to government, would be EU membership (she stated she was certain that there would be an agreement with the Left-Green Movement on EU membership), and she predicted that Iceland would adopt the euro within four years. (see Iceland and the European Union).

== Constituencies ==
There are six constituencies in Iceland. According to the Law on Parliamentary Elections (nr.24/2000), each constituency is granted 9 seats decided by proportional voting in the constituency, and finally 9 special Leveling seats (either 1 or 2 per constituency, depending on their population size) will work to adjust the result, so that proportionality is also ensured according to the overall number of party votes at the national level. The number of constituency seats shall however be adjusted ahead of the next election, if the fraction of residents with suffrage per available seat in the constituency became more than twice as big in the latest election, when comparing the constituency with the highest fraction against the one with the lowest fraction. In that case a constituency seat shall travel from the constituency with the lowest figure to the one with the highest figure, until the result of the equation comply with the rule. However, the total number of seats (including leveling seats) must never become less than six in any constituency. The box below display the number of available seats in each constituency at the 2009 parliamentary election.

Constituency	Constituency seats	Leveling seats	Total seats
Reykjavik North	9	2	11
Reykjavik South	9	2	11
Southwest	10	2	12
Northwest	8	1	9
Northeast	9	1	10
South	9	1	10
Total	54	9	63

=== Method for apportionment of constituency seats ===
The available constituency seats are first distributed to each party according to the D'Hondt method, so that proportional representation is ensured within each of the constituencies. The next step is to apportion these party distributed seats to the candidates within the party having the highest "vote score", after counting both direct candidate votes and their share of party votes in the constituency. In Iceland the "candidate vote system" is that, for each constituency, each party provides a pre-ranked list of candidates beneath each party name (listed according to the preferred order decided by the party), but where the voters voting for the party can alter this pre-ranked order by renumbering the individual candidates and/or crossing out those candidates they do not like, so that such candidates will not get a share of the voter's "personal vote" for the party.

As a restriction on the possibility of re-ranking candidates, it is however only possible to alter the first several candidates on the list. The borderline for alterations is drawn for the first three candidates if the party only win one of the total seats in the constituency, or if more than one seat is won the borderline shall be drawn at the pre-ranked number equal to twice the total number of seats being won by the party in the constituency. So if a party has won two seats in a constituency, then the voter is only allowed to re-rank the top four ranked candidates on the list, with any rank altering by voters below this line simply being ignored when subsequently calculating the candidate vote shares within each party. Final calculation of the candidate vote shares is always done according to the Borda method, where all candidates above the previously described borderline in the ranking are granted voting fraction values according to the voters noted rank. If the number of considered candidates consist of four (as in the given example), then the first ranked candidate is assigned a value of 1 (a so-called full personal vote), the next one get the value 0.75 (1/4 less), followed likewise by 0.50 and 0.25 respectively for the two last candidates. If the number of considered candidates instead had been six (due to winning 3 seats), then the first ranked candidate in a similar way would be assigned a value of 1 (a so-called full personal vote), with the following five candidates receiving respectively 5/6, 4/6, 3/6, 2/6 and 1/6. As mentioned above, crossed out names will always be allocated a 0.00 value. The accumulated total score of the candidates voting fractions, will be used in determining which candidates receive the seats won by their party. Note that candidate vote scores are not directly comparable to candidates from other parties, as how many seats are being won in a constituency by a particular party will effect how their candidates receive voting fractions (like in the above examples, where a candidate ranked number four for a party winning two seats would receive a voting fraction of 0.25, compared to 0.50 for an equally ranked candidate belonging to a party winning 3 seats)

=== Method for apportionment of leveling seats ===
After the initial apportionment of constituency seats, all the parties that exceed the election threshold of 5% nationally will also qualify to potentially be granted the extra leveling seats, which seek to adjust the result towards seat proportionality at the national level.

The calculation procedure for the distribution of leveling seats is, first, for each party having exceeded the national threshold of 5%, to calculate the ratio of its total number of votes at the national level divided by the sum of one extra seat added to the number of seats the party have so far won. The first leveling seat will go to the party with the highest ratio of votes per seat. The same calculation process is then repeated, until all 9 leveling seats have been allocated to specific parties. A party's "votes per seat" ratio will change during this calculation process, after each additional leveling seat being won. The second and final step is for each party being granted a leveling seat to pin point, across all constituencies, which of its runner-up candidates (candidates that came short of winning direct election through a constituency seat) should then win this additional seat. This selection is made by first identifying the constituency having the strongest "relative constituency vote shares for this additional seat of the party", which is decided by another proportional calculation, where the "relative vote share for the party list in each constituency", is divided with the sum of "one extra seat added to the number of already won constituency seats by the party list in the constituency". When this strongest constituency has been identified, the leveling seat will be automatically granted to the highest placed unelected runner-up candidate on the party list in this constituency, who among the remaining candidates have the highest personal vote score (the same figure as the one used when ranking candidates for constituency seats).

The above described method is used for apportionment of all the party allocated leveling seats. Note that when selecting which of a party's constituencies shall receive its apportioned leveling seat, this identification may only happen in exactly the same numerical order as the leveling seats were calculated at the party level. This is important because the number of available leveling seats are limited per constituency, meaning that the last calculated leveling seats in all circumstances can never be granted to candidates who belong to constituencies where the available leveling seats already were granted to other parties.

== Opinion polls ==
Date	Source	D	S	V	B	F	O	Other	Lead
23 Apr 2009	RÚV	23.2	29.8	26.3	12.0	1.5	6.8	0.4	3.5
21 Apr 2009	Angus Reid Global Monitor	27.3	32.2	25.7	6.8	0.7	4.9	2.4	4.9
16 Apr 2009	RÚV	23.3	30.7	28.2	11.1	2.0	4.4	0.3	2.5
9 Apr 2009	RÚV	25.7	32.6	26.0	9.8	1.1	3.6	1.2	6.6
3 Apr 2009	IceNews	25.4	29.4	27.2	10.7			7.3	2.2
30 Mar 2009	IceNews	29.1	31.7	25.8	7.5	1.8		4.1	2.6
17 Mar 2009	IceNews	26.5	31.2	24.6	11.3	1.3	2.5	2.6	4.7
17 Feb 2009	Iceland Review	25.8	27.7	24.1	15.0	2.5		4.9	1.9
12 May 2007	Election	36.6	26.8	14.4	11.7	7.3		3.2	9.8

== Results ==
Party	Votes	%	+/–	Seats	+/–
Social Democratic Alliance	55,758	29.79	+3.03	20	+2
Independence Party	44,371	23.70	–12.94	16	–9
Left-Green Movement	40,581	21.68	+7.33	14	+5
Progressive Party	27,699	14.80	+3.08	9	+2
Citizens' Movement	13,519	7.22	New	4	New
Liberal Party	4,148	2.22	–5.04	0	–4
Democracy Movement	1,107	0.59	New	0	New
**Total**	**187,183**	**100.00**	–	**63**	**0**
Valid votes	187,183	96.50			
Invalid/blank votes	6,792	3.50			
Total votes	**193,975**	**100.00**			
Registered voters/turnout	227,843	85.14			
Source: Statistics Iceland

=== Elected MPs ===
Members of the Althing elected on 25 April 2009
Reykjavik North	Reykjavik South	Southwest	Northwest	Northeast	South
1. Jóhanna Sigurðardóttir (S); 2. Katrín Jakobsdóttir (V); 3. Illugi Gunnarsson (D); 4. Helgi Hjörvar (S); 5. Árni Þór Sigurðsson (V); 6. Valgerður Bjarnadóttir (S); 7. Pétur H. Blöndal (D); 8. Sigmundur D. Gunnlaugsson (B); 9. Þráinn Bertelsson (O)	1. Össur Skarphéðinsson (S); 2. Ólöf Nordal (D); 3. Svandís Svavarsdóttir (V); 4. Sigríður I. Ingadóttir (S); 5. Guðlaugur Þór Þórðarson (D); 6. Lilja Mósesdóttir (V); 7. Skúli Helgason (S); 8. Vigdís Hauksdóttir (B); 9. Birgitta Jónsdóttir (O)	1. Árni Páll Árnason (S); 2. Bjarni Benediktsson (D); 3. Guðfríður L. Grétarsdóttir (V); 4. Katrín Júlíusdóttir (S); 5. Þorgerður K. Gunnarsdóttir (D); 6. Siv Friðleifsdóttir (B); 7. Þórunn Sveinbjarnardóttir (S); 8. Ragnheiður Ríkharðsdóttir (D); 9. Þór Saari (O); 10. Ögmundur Jónasson (V)	1. Ásbjörn Óttarsson (D); 2. Jón Bjarnason (V); 3. Guðbjartur Hannesson (S); 4. Gunnar B. Sveinsson (B); 5. Einar K. Guðfinnsson (D); 6. Lilja R. Magnúsdóttir (V); 7. Ólína Þorvarðardóttir (S); 8. Guðmundur Steingrímsson (B)	1. Steingrímur J. Sigfússon (V); 2. Birkir Jón Jónsson (B); 3. Kristján L. Möller (S); 4. Kristján Þór Júlíusson (D); 5. Þuríður Backman (V); 6. Höskuldur Þórhallsson (B); 7. Sigmundur E. Rúnarsson (S); 8. Björn Valur Gíslason (V); 9. Tryggvi Þór Herbertsson (D)	1. Björgvin G. Sigurðsson (S); 2. Ragnheiður E. Árnadóttir (D); 3. Sigurður I. Jóhannsson (B); 4. Atli Gíslason (O); 5. Oddný G. Harðardóttir (S); 6. Unnur Brá Konráðsdóttir (D); 7. Eygló Harðardóttir (B); 8. Róbert Marshall (S); 9. Árni Johnsen (D)
1. Álfheiður Ingadóttir (V); 2. Steinunn V. Óskarsdóttir (S)	1. Ásta R. Jóhannesdóttir (S); 2. Birgir Ármannsson (D)	1. Magnús Orri Schram (S); 2. Jón Gunnarsson (D)	1. Ásmundur E. Daðason (V)	1. Jónína R. Guðmundsdóttir (S)	1. Margrét Tryggvadóttir (O)
Key: S = Social Democratic Alliance; D = Independence Party; V = Left-Green Movement; B = Progressive Party; O = Citizens' Movement; L1-L9 = Leveling seats nr.1-9.Source: Morgunblaðið and Landskjörstjórn (The National Electoral Commission)

For the parties having qualified with a national result above the 5% election threshold, the 9 leveling seats (L1-L9) were first distributed party-wise according to the calculation method in this particular order (where the party's total number of national votes was divided by the sum of "won seats plus 1" - with an extra leveling seat granted to the party with the highest fraction - while repeating this process until all 9 leveling seats had been determined). At the next step, these leveling seats were then by the same order distributed one by one to the relative strongest constituency of the seat winning party (while disregarding the constituencies that already ran out of vacant leveling seats). At the third step, the specific leveling seat is finally granted to the party's highest ranked runner-up candidate within the constituency, according to the same accumulated candidate vote score as being used when apportioning the constituency seats.

The table below display how the leveling seats were apportioned, and the "relative constituency strength" figures for each party, which is measured for each constituency as the "party vote share" divided by "won constituency seats of the party +1". To illustrate how the selection method works, each party in a constituency being apportioned a leveling seat, have got their figure for relative strength (vote share per seat) bolded in the table, with a parenthesis noting the number of the leveling seat. Due to the fact that constituencies run out of available leveling seats one by one as the calculation progress, it can sometimes happen that the constituency with the highest relative strength needs to be disregarded. In example, if there had been no restrictions to the available number of leveling seats in a constituency, then the table below would have distributed the Left-Green Movement's L3-seat to its relative strongest South Constituency with an 8.5574% vote share per seat; But as the one and only leveling seat of this constituency had already been granted to the Citizens Movement (who won the L1-seat), then the L3-seat instead had to be granted only to the second strongest constituency of the Left-Green Movement - namely the Reykjavik North constituency with an 8.0028% vote share per seat.

Candidates selected for the 9 leveling seats (L1-L9 are first apportioned at national level to parties, then to the relative strongest constituency of the party, and finally given to its highest ranked runner-up candidate)	Leveling seats won by party	Reykjavik North (party vote share divided by won local seats +1)	Reykjavik South (party vote share divided by won local seats +1)	Southwest (party vote share divided by won local seats +1)	Northwest (party vote share divided by won local seats +1)	Northeast (party vote share divided by won local seats +1)	South (party vote share divided by won local seats +1)
Social Democratic Alliance (S)	L2+L4+L6+L8	**8.2344% (L4)**; 6.5875% (Note: Party vote share divided by "won constituency seats +2", has also been calculated for constituencies with two leveling seats (as each party in theory has a chance to win both of them).)	**8.2345% (L2)**; 6.5876%	**8.0431% (L6)**; 6.4345%	7.5755%	**7.5773% (L8)**	6.9915%
Independence Party (D)	L5+L9	7.1258% 3.2032%	**7.7271% (L5)**; 3.2325%	**6.9108% (L9)**; 3.8512%	7.6437%	5.8185%	6.5576%
Left-Green Movement (V)	L3+L7	**8.0028% (L3)**; 6.0021%	7.6282% 5.7212%	5.7991% 4.3493%	**7.6077% (L7)**	7.4215%	8.5574%
Progressive Party (B)
4.8048% 3.2032%	4.8488% 3.2325%	5.7769% 3.8512%	7.5111%	8.4232%	6.6630%		
Citizens' Movement (O)	L1	4.7792% 3.1861%	4.3421% 2.8947%	4.5459% 3.0306%	3.3343%	2.9528%	**5.1215% (L1)**
