= Budget Committee (Iceland) =

Standing committee of the Icelandic parliament

The Budget Committee (Icelandic: Fjárlaganefnd) is a standing committee of the Icelandic parliament.

== Jurisdiction ==
According to law № 55/1991, with later amendments, all matters relating to the following subjects are referred to the Budget Committee:

- State finance
- Budget spending
- State assets
- Loan authorisation
- State guarantees
- Pension

== Members, 140th parliament ==
The main members have seats in the committees and attend the meetings. When they are unable to do so the substitute members temporarily take their place.

=== Main ===
Name	Party
Árni Þór Sigurðsson	Left-Green Movement
Ásbjörn Óttarsson	Independence Party
Björgvin G. Sigurðsson	Social Democratic Alliance
Björn Valur Gíslason, 1st vice-chairman	Left-Green Movement
Höskuldur Þórhallsson	Progressive Party
Illugi Gunnarsson	Independence Party
Kristján Þór Júlíusson	Independence Party
Sigmundur Ernir Rúnarsson, 2nd vice-chairman	Social Democratic Alliance
Sigríður Ingibjörg Ingadóttir, chairman	Social Democratic Alliance

=== Substitute ===
Name	Party
Árni Johnsen	Independence Party
Helgi Hjörvar	Social Democratic Alliance
Lilja Rafney Magnúsdóttir	Left-Green Movement
Magnús Orri Schram	Social Democratic Alliance
Ragnheiður Ríkharðsdóttir	Independence Party
Valgerður Bjarnadóttir	Social Democratic Alliance
Vigdís Hauksdóttir	Progressive Party
Þorgerður Katrín Gunnarsdóttir	Independence Party
Þuríður Backman	Left-Green Movement

== Chairmen ==
=== 114th parliament (1991–2011) ===
Chairman	Party	Parliament	Years
Karl Steinar Guðnason	Social Democratic Party	114th	1991
Karl Steinar Guðnason	Social Democratic Party	115th	1991–1992
Karl Steinar Guðnason	Social Democratic Party	116th	1992–1993
Sigbjörn Gunnarsson	Social Democratic Party	117th	1993–1994
Sigbjörn Gunnarsson	Social Democratic Party	118th	1994–1995
Jón Halldór Kristjánsson	Progressive Party	119th	1995
Jón Halldór Kristjánsson	Progressive Party	120th	1995–1996
Jón Halldór Kristjánsson	Progressive Party	121st	1996–1997
Jón Halldór Kristjánsson	Progressive Party	122nd	1997–1998
Jón Halldór Kristjánsson	Progressive Party	123rd	1998–1999
Jón Halldór Kristjánsson	Progressive Party	124th	1999
Jón Halldór Kristjánsson	Progressive Party	125th	1999–2000
Jón Halldór Kristjánsson	Progressive Party	126th	2000–2001
Ólafur Örn Haraldsson	Progressive Party	126th	2001
Ólafur Örn Haraldsson	Progressive Party	127th	2001–2002
Ólafur Örn Haraldsson	Progressive Party	128th	2002–2003
Magnús Stefánsson	Progressive Party	129th	2003
Magnús Stefánsson	Progressive Party	130th	2003–2004
Magnús Stefánsson	Progressive Party	131st	2004–2005
Magnús Stefánsson	Progressive Party	132nd	2005–2006
Birkir Jón Jónsson	Progressive Party	132nd	2006
Birkir Jón Jónsson	Progressive Party	133rd	2006–2007
Gunnar Svavarsson	Social Democratic Alliance	134th	2007
Gunnar Svavarsson	Social Democratic Alliance	135th	2007–2008
Gunnar Svavarsson	Social Democratic Alliance	136th	2008–2009
Guðbjartur Hannesson	Social Democratic Alliance	137th	2009
Guðbjartur Hannesson	Social Democratic Alliance	138th	—
Guðbjartur Hannesson	Social Democratic Alliance	139th	—
Oddný Guðbjörg Harðardóttir	Social Democratic Alliance	139th	—

=== 140th parliament (2011-present) ===
Chairman	Party	Parliament	Years
Sigríður Ingibjörg Ingadóttir	Social Democratic Alliance	140th	—

== See also ==
- List of standing committees of the Icelandic parliament
