= List of members of the Althing, 2003–2007 =

This is a list of the members of the Iceland Althing (Parliament) from 2003 till 2007.

== Election results (12 May 2003) ==
National party	Chairperson(s)	Seats	±
Independence Party	Davíð Oddsson	22 / 63	▼4
Social Democratic Alliance	Össur Skarphéðinsson	20 / 63	▲3
Progressive Party	Halldór Ásgrímsson	12 / 63	0
Left-Green Movement	Steingrímur Sigfússon	5 / 63	▼1
Liberal Party	Guðjón Kristjánsson	4 / 63	▲2

== List of chosen MPs ==
Name	National party	Constituency	# of votes
Anna Gunnarsdóttir	Social Democratic Alliance	Northwest	
Birgir Ármannsson	Independence Party	Reykjavik South	
Birkir Jónsson	Progressive Party	Northeast	
Bjarni Benediktsson	Independence Party	Southwest	
Björgvin Sigurðsson	Social Democratic Alliance	South	
Björn Bjarnason	Independence Party	Reykjavik North	
Bryndís Hlöðversdóttir (Note: Replaced by Ingibjörg Gísladóttir in 2005.)	Social Democratic Alliance	Reykjavik North	
Dagný Jónsdóttir	Progressive Party	Northeast	
Davíð Oddsson (Note: Replaced by Ásta Möller in 2006.)	Independence Party	Reykjavik North	
Drífa Hjartardóttir	Independence Party	South	
Einar Guðfinnsson	Independence Party	Northwest	
Einar Kristjánsson	Independence Party	Northwest	
Einar Sigurðsson	Social Democratic Alliance	Northeast	
Geir Haarde	Independence Party	Reykjavik South	
Gunnar Birgisson (Note: Replaced by Sigurrós Þorgrímsdóttir in 2006.)	Independence Party	Southwest	
Gunnar Örlygsson (Note: Became a member of the Independence Party in 2005.)	Liberal Party	Southwest	
Guðjón Hjörleifsson	Independence Party	South	
Guðjón Kristjánsson	Liberal Party	Northwest	
Guðlaugur Þórðarson	Independence Party	Reykjavik North	
Guðmundur Hallvarðsson	Independence Party	Reykjavik South	
Guðmundur Stefánsson (Note: Replaced by Valdimar Friðriksson in 2005. Became a member of Liberal Party in 2007.)	Social Democratic Alliance	Southwest	
Guðni Ágústsson	Progressive Party	South	
Guðrún Ögmundsdóttir	Social Democratic Alliance	Reykjavik North	
Halldór Blöndal	Independence Party	Northeast	
Halldór Ásgrímsson (Note: Replaced by Guðjón Jónsson in 2006.)	Progressive Party	Reykjavik North	
Hjálmar Árnason	Progressive Party	South	
Helgi Hjörvar	Social Democratic Alliance	Reykjavik North	
Jóhann Ársælsson	Social Democratic Alliance	Northwest	
Jóhanna Sigurðardóttir	Social Democratic Alliance	Reykjavik South	
Jón Bjarnason	Left-Green Movement	Northwest	
Jón Gunnarsson	Social Democratic Alliance	South	
Jón Kristjánsson	Progressive Party	Northeast	
Jónína Bjartmarz	Progressive Party	Reykjavik South	
Katrín Júlíusdóttir	Social Democratic Alliance	Southwest	
Kolbrún Halldórsdóttir	Left-Green Movement	Reykjavik North	
Kristinn Gunnarsson (Note: Became a member of Liberal Party in 2007.)	Progressive Party	Northwest	
Kristján Möller	Social Democratic Alliance	Northeast	
Lúðvík Bergvinsson	Social Democratic Alliance	South	
Magnús Hafsteinsson	Liberal Party	South	
Magnús Stefánsson	Progressive Party	Northwest	
Margrét Frímannsdóttir	Social Democratic Alliance	South	
Mörður Árnason	Social Democratic Alliance	Reykjavik South	
Össur Skarphéðinsson	Social Democratic Alliance	Reykjavik North	
Pétur Blöndal	Independence Party	Reykjavik South	
Rannveig Guðmundsdóttir	Social Democratic Alliance	Southwest	
Sigríður Þórðardóttir	Independence Party	Southwest	
Sigurður Kristjánsson	Independence Party	Reykjavik North	
Sigurjón Þórðarson	Liberal Party	Northwest	
Siv Friðleifsdóttir	Progressive Party	Southwest	
Sólveig Pétursdóttir	Independence Party	Reykjavik South	
Steingrímur Sigfússon	Left-Green Movement	Northeast	
Sturla Böðvarsson	Independence Party	Northwest	
Tómas Olrich (Note: Replaced by Arnbjörg Sveinsdóttir in 2004.)	Independence Party	Northeast	
Valgerður Sverrisdóttir	Progressive Party	Northeast	
Ágúst Ágústsson	Social Democratic Alliance	Reykjavik South	
Árni Ragnar Árnason (Note: Replaced by Kjartan Ólafsson in 2004.)	Independence Party	South	
Árni Magnússon (Note: Replaced by Sæunn Stefánsdóttir in 2006.)	Progressive Party	Reykjavik North	
Árni Mathiesen	Independence Party	Southwest	
Ásta Jóhannesdóttir	Social Democratic Alliance	Reykjavik South	
Ögmundur Jónasson	Left-Green Movement	Reykjavik South	
Þorgerður Gunnarsdóttir	Independence Party	Southwest	
Þórunn Sveinbjarnardóttir	Social Democratic Alliance	Southwest	
Þuríður Backman	Left-Green Movement	Northeast	
