= List of members of the Althing, 2007–2009 =

This is a list of the members of the Icelandic Althing from 2007 until 2009.

== Election results (12 May 2007) ==
National party	Chairperson(s)	Seats	±
Independence Party	Geir Haarde	25 / 63	▲3
Social Democratic Alliance	Ingibjörg Gísladóttir	18 / 63	▼2
Left-Green Movement	Steingrímur Sigfússon	9 / 63	▲4
Progressive Party	Jón Sigurðsson	7 / 63	▼5
Liberal Party	Guðjón Kristjánsson	4 / 63	0

== Bureau ==
=== President and Vice Presidents ===
Office	2007	2008	2009
President	Sturla Böðvarsson		Guðbjartur Hannesson
1st Vice President	Ásta Jóhannesdóttir		Kjartan Ólafsson
2nd Vice President	Þuríður Backman		
3rd Vice President	Kjartan Ólafsson		Ragnheiður Ríkharðsdóttir
4th Vice President	Einar Sigurðsson		
5th Vice President	Magnús Stefánsson		Guðfinna Bjarnadóttir
6th Vice President	Ragnheiður Ríkharðsdóttir		Kristinn Gunnarsson

== List of chosen MPs ==
Name	National party	Constituency	# of votes
Arnbjörg Sveinsdóttir	Independence Party	Northeast	
Atli Gíslason	Left-Green Movement	South	
Birgir Ármannsson	Independence Party	Reykjavik South	
Birkir Jónsson	Progressive Party	Northeast	
Bjarni Benediktsson	Independence Party	Southwest	
Bjarni Harðarson (Note: Replaced by Helga Harðardóttir in 2008.)	Progressive Party	South	
Björgvin Sigurðsson	Social Democratic Alliance	South	
Björk Guðjónsdóttir	Independence Party	South	
Björn Bjarnason	Independence Party	Reykjavik South	
Einar Guðfinnsson	Independence Party	Northwest	
Einar Sigurðsson	Social Democratic Alliance	Northeast	
Ellert Schram	Social Democratic Alliance	Reykjavik North	
Geir Haarde (Note: Became Prime Minister on 15 June 2006, and resigned on 1 February 2009.)	Independence Party	Reykjavik South	
Grétar Jónsson	Liberal Party	South	
Gunnar Svavarsson	Social Democratic Alliance	Southwest	
Guðfinna Bjarnadóttir	Independence Party	Reykjavik North	
Guðlaugur Þórðarson	Independence Party	Reykjavik North	
Guðni Ágústsson (Note: Replaced by Eygló Harðardóttir on 17 November 2008.)	Progressive Party	South	
Helgi Hjörvar	Social Democratic Alliance	Reykjavik North	
Illugi Gunnarsson	Independence Party	Reykjavik South	
Ingibjörg Gísladóttir	Social Democratic Alliance	Reykjavik South	
Jóhanna Sigurðardóttir (Note: Became Prime Minister on 1 February 2009 after Haarde's resignation.)	Social Democratic Alliance	Reykjavik North	
Jón Gunnarsson	Independence Party	Southwest	
Jón Magnússon (Note: Became member of the Independence Party in 2009.)	Liberal Party	Reykjavik South	
Katrín Jakobsdóttir	Left-Green Movement	Reykjavik North	
Katrín Júlíusdóttir	Social Democratic Alliance	Southwest	
Karl Matthíasson (Note: Became member of the Liberal Party in 2009.)	Social Democratic Alliance	Northwest	
Kjartan Ólafsson	Independence Party	South	
Kolbrún Halldórsdóttir	Left-Green Movement	Reykjavik South	
Kristinn Gunnarsson (Note: Became independent in 2009.)	Liberal Party	Northwest	
Kristján Júlíusson	Independence Party	Northeast	
Kristján Möller	Social Democratic Alliance	Northeast	
Lúðvík Bergvinsson	Social Democratic Alliance	South	
Magnús Stefánsson	Progressive Party	Northwest	
Pétur Blöndal	Independence Party	Reykjavik North	
Ragnheiður Árnadóttir	Independence Party	Southwest	
Ragnheiður Ríkharðsdóttir	Independence Party	Southwest	
Sigurður Kristjánsson	Independence Party	Reykjavik North	
Siv Friðleifsdóttir	Progressive Party	Southwest	
Steingrímur Sigfússon	Left-Green Movement	Northeast	
Steinunn Óskarsdóttir	Social Democratic Alliance	Reykjavik North	
Sturla Böðvarsson	Independence Party	Northwest	
Valgerður Sverrisdóttir	Progressive Party	Northeast	
Ágúst Ágústsson	Social Democratic Alliance	Reykjavik South	
Álfheiður Ingadóttir	Left-Green Movement	Reykjavik South	
Ármann Ólafsson	Independence Party	Southwest	
Árni Árnason	Social Democratic Alliance	Southwest	
Árni Johnsen	Independence Party	South	
Árni Mathiesen	Independence Party	South	
Árni Sigurðsson	Left-Green Movement	Reykjavik North	
Ásta Jóhannesdóttir	Social Democratic Alliance	Reykjavik South	
Ásta Möller	Independence Party	Reykjavik South	
Ögmundur Jónasson	Left-Green Movement	Southwest	
Össur Skarphéðinsson	Social Democratic Alliance	Reykjavik North	
Þorgerður Gunnarsdóttir	Independence Party	Southwest	
Þórunn Sveinbjarnardóttir	Social Democratic Alliance	Southwest	
Þuríður Backman	Left-Green Movement	Northeast	
Ólöf Nordal	Independence Party	Northeast	
Höskuldur Þórhallsson	Progressive Party	Northeast	
Guðbjartur Hannesson	Social Democratic Alliance	Northwest	
Jón Bjarnason	Left-Green Movement	Northwest	
Guðjón Kristjánsson	Liberal Party	Northwest	
Herdís Þórðardóttir (Note: Replaced Einar Kristjánsson on 14 July 2007.)	Independence Party	Northwest	
