= Judicial Affairs and Education Committee =

Standing committee of the Icelandic parliament

The Judicial Affairs and Education Committee (Icelandic: Allsherjar- og menntamálanefnd) is a standing committee of the Icelandic parliament.

== Jurisdiction ==
According to law № 55/1991, with later amendments, all matters relating to the following subjects are referred to the Judicial Affairs and Education Committee:

- Judiciary
- Law enforcement
- Human rights
- Citizenship
- Consumption
- Church of Iceland and other sects
- Education
- Culture
- Science
- Technology

== Members, 140th parliament ==
The main members have seats in the committees and attend the meetings. When they are unable to do so, the substitute members temporarily take their place.

=== Main ===
Name	Party
Birgitta Jónsdóttir	The Movement
Björgvin G. Sigurðsson, chairman	Social Democratic Alliance
Jónína Rós Guðmundsdóttir	Social Democratic Alliance
Ragnheiður Ríkharðsdóttir	Independence Party
Siv Friðleifsdóttir	Progressive Party
Skúli Helgason, 1st vice-chairman	Social Democratic Alliance
Þorgerður Katrín Gunnarsdóttir	Independence Party
Þráinn Bertelsson, 2nd vice-chairman	Left-Green Movement
Þuríður Backman	Left-Green Movement

=== Substitute ===
Name	Party
Björn Valur Gíslason	Left-Green Movement
Eygló Harðardóttir	Progressive Party
Kristján Þór Júlíusson	Independence Party
Kristján L. Möller	Social Democratic Alliance
Lilja Rafney Magnúsdóttir	Left-Green Movement
Magnús Orri Schram	Social Democratic Alliance
Margrét Tryggvadóttir	The Movement
Ólína Þorvarðardóttir	Social Democratic Alliance
Tryggvi Þór Herbertsson	Independence Party

== See also ==
- List of standing committees of the Icelandic parliament
