= Northeast (Althing constituency) =

Constituency of the Althing, the national legislature of Iceland

- Norðaustur
- Constituency for the Althing
- Location of Northeast within Iceland
- Municipality: List: Akureyri; Dalvíkurbyggð; Eyjafjarðarsveit; Fjallabyggð; Fjarðabyggð; Fljótsdalshreppur; Grýtubakkahreppur; Hörgársveit; Langanesbyggð; Múlaþing; Norðurþing; Svalbarðsstrandarhreppur; Tjörneshreppur; Vopnafjörður; Þingeyjarsveit
- Region: Eastern; Northeastern
- Population: 42,659 (2024)
- Electorate: 31,071 (2024)
- Area: 38,392 km^{2} (2018)

Current Constituency
- Created: 2003
- Seats: 9 (2003–present) (Note: Excludes compensatory seats.)
- Member of the Althing: List: Eydís Ásbjörnsdóttir (S); Ingibjörg Ólöf Isaksen (B); Ingvar Þóroddsson (C); Jens Garðar Helgason (D); Logi Már Einarsson (S); Njáll Trausti Friðbertsson (D); Sigmundur Davíð Gunnlaugsson (M); Sigurjón Þórðarson (F); Þórarinn Ingi Pétursson (B); Þorgrímur Sigmundsson (M)
- Created from: List: Eastern; Northeastern; Northwestern

Northeast (Icelandic: Norðaustur) is one of the six multi-member constituencies of the Althing, the national legislature of Iceland. The constituency was established in 2003 following the re-organisation of constituencies across Iceland when the Northeastern constituency was merged with the Eastern constituency (excluding Sveitarfélagið Hornafjörður municipality which was merged into the South constituency) and Siglufjörður municipality from the Northwestern constituency. Northeast consists of the regions of Eastern and Northeastern. The constituency currently elects nine of the 63 members of the Althing using the open party-list proportional representation electoral system. At the 2024 parliamentary election it had 31,071 registered electors.

== History ==
In September 1997 Prime Minister Davíð Oddsson appointed a committee headed by Friðrik Klemenz Sophusson to review the division of constituencies in Iceland and the organisation of elections. The committee's report was published in October 1998 and recommended, amongst other things, that the number of constituencies be reduced and that they be more equal in population size. The Althing passed an amendment to the constitution in June 1999 which removed the reference to specific eight constituencies contained within Article 31 and instead simply stated that there would be six or seven constituencies and that the Althing would determine the boundaries between the constituencies. The amendment also required that if, following an election to Althing, the number of registered electors per seat (including compensatory seats) in any constituency is less than half of that in another constituency, the National Electoral Commission shall change the allocation of seats so as to reduce the imbalance.

Northeast was one of six constituencies (kjördæmi) established by the "Elections to the Althing Act no. 24/2000" (Lög um kosningar til Alþingis, nr. 24/2000) passed by the Althing in May 2000. The Act initially allocated ten seats to the constituency - nine constituency seats and one compensatory seat.

== Electoral system ==
Northeast currently elects nine of the 63 members of the Althing using the open party-list proportional representation electoral system. Constituency seats are allocated using the D'Hondt method. Compensatory seats (equalisation seas) are calculated based on the national vote and are allocated using the D'Hondt method at the constituency level. Only parties that reach the 5% national threshold compete for compensatory seats.

== Election results ==
=== Summary ===
Election	Left-Green V / U			Social Democrats S			People's F			Pirate P / Þ			Viðreisn C			Progressive B			Independence D			Centre M		
Election	Votes	%	Seats	Votes	%	Seats	Votes	%	Seats	Votes	%	Seats	Votes	%	Seats	Votes	%	Seats	Votes	%	Seats	Votes	%	Seats
2024	920	3.78%	0	5,183	21.30%	2	3,475	14.28%	1	438	1.80%	0	2,296	9.44%	1	3,445	14.16%	1	3,652	15.01%	2	3,818	15.69%	2
2021	3,040	12.92%	1	2,465	10.47%	1	2,026	8.61%	1	1,256	5.34%	0	1,263	5.37%	0	6,016	25.56%	3	4,346	18.47%	2	2,092	8.89%	1
2017	4,700	19.91%	2	3,275	13.87%	1	1,005	4.26%	0	1,295	5.48%	0	495	2.10%	0	3,386	14.34%	2	4,787	20.27%	2	4,389	18.59%	2
2016	4,539	19.99%	2	1,816	8.00%	1	645	2.84%	0	2,265	9.98%	1	1,482	6.53%	0	4,542	20.01%	2	6,014	26.49%	3			
2013	3,733	15.81%	2	2,505	10.61%	1				716	3.03%	0				8,173	34.62%	4	5,327	22.57%	2			
2009	6,937	29.69%	3	5,312	22.73%	2										5,905	25.27%	2	4,079	17.46%	2			
2007	4,558	19.56%	2	4,840	20.77%	2										5,726	24.57%	2	6,522	27.99%	3			
2003	3,329	14.13%	1	5,503	23.35%	2										7,722	32.77%	4	5,544	23.53%	2			

(Excludes compensatory seats.)

=== Detailed ===
==== 2020s ====
===== 2024 =====
Results of the 2024 parliamentary election held on 30 November 2024:

Party		Votes	%	Seats		
Party		Votes	%	Con.	Com.	Tot.
Social Democratic Alliance	S	5,183	21.30%	2	0	2
Centre Party	M	3,818	15.69%	2	0	2
Independence Party	D	3,652	15.01%	2	0	2
People's Party	F	3,475	14.28%	1	0	1
Progressive Party	B	3,445	14.16%	1	1	2
Viðreisn	C	2,296	9.44%	1	0	1
Socialist Party of Iceland	J	924	3.80%	0	0	0
Left-Green Movement	V	920	3.78%	0	0	0
Pirate Party	P	438	1.80%	0	0	0
Democratic Party	L	183	0.75%	0	0	0
Valid votes		24,334	100.00%	9	1	10
Blank votes		445	1.79%			
Rejected votes – other		30	0.12%			
Total polled		24,809	79.85%			
Registered electors		31,071				

The following candidates were elected:

- Constituency seats - Eydís Ásbjörnsdóttir (S), 3,906.25 votes; Ingibjörg Ólöf Isaksen (B), 3,436.75 votes; Ingvar Þóroddsson (C), 2,291.00 votes; Jens Garðar Helgason (D), 3,563.00 votes; Logi Már Einarsson (S), 5,104.00 votes; Njáll Trausti Friðbertsson (D), 2,712.00 votes; Sigmundur Davíð Gunnlaugsson (M), 3,795.00 votes; Sigurjón Þórðarson (F), 3,456.33 votes; and Þorgrímur Sigmundsson (M), 2,848.50 votes.
- Compensatory seats - Þórarinn Ingi Pétursson (B), 2,568.00 votes.

===== 2021 =====
Results of the 2021 parliamentary election held on 25 September 2021:

Party		Votes	%	Seats		
Party		Votes	%	Con.	Com.	Tot.
Progressive Party	B	6,016	25.56%	3	0	3
Independence Party	D	4,346	18.47%	2	0	2
Left-Green Movement	V	3,040	12.92%	1	1	2
Social Democratic Alliance	S	2,465	10.47%	1	0	1
Centre Party	M	2,092	8.89%	1	0	1
People's Party	F	2,026	8.61%	1	0	1
Viðreisn	C	1,263	5.37%	0	0	0
Pirate Party	P	1,256	5.34%	0	0	0
Socialist Party of Iceland	J	954	4.05%	0	0	0
Liberal Democratic Party	O	78	0.33%	0	0	0
Valid votes		23,536	100.00%	9	1	10
Blank votes		596	2.46%			
Rejected votes – other		48	0.20%			
Total polled		24,180	81.01%			
Registered electors		29,847				

The following candidates were elected:

- Constituency seats - Berglind Ósk Guðmundsdóttir (D), 3,263.75 votes; Bjarkey Gunnarsdóttir (V), 3,013.50 votes; Ingibjörg Ólöf Isaksen (B), 5,981.33 votes; Jakob Frímann Magnússon (F), 2,004.00 votes; Líneik Anna Sævarsdóttir (B), 4,998.67 votes; Logi Már Einarsson (S), 2,454.33 votes; Njáll Trausti Friðbertsson (D), 4,291.75 votes; Sigmundur Davíð Gunnlaugsson (M), 2,080.33 votes; and Þórarinn Ingi Pétursson (B), 4,016.33 votes.
- Compensatory seats - Jódís Skúladóttir (V), 2,284.50 votes.

==== 2010s ====
===== 2017 =====
Results of the 2017 parliamentary election held on 28 October 2017:

Party		Votes	%	Seats		
Party		Votes	%	Con.	Com.	Tot.
Independence Party	D	4,787	20.27%	2	0	2
Left-Green Movement	V	4,700	19.91%	2	0	2
Centre Party	M	4,389	18.59%	2	0	2
Progressive Party	B	3,386	14.34%	2	0	2
Social Democratic Alliance	S	3,275	13.87%	1	1	2
Pirate Party	P	1,295	5.48%	0	0	0
People's Party	F	1,005	4.26%	0	0	0
Viðreisn	C	495	2.10%	0	0	0
Bright Future	A	169	0.72%	0	0	0
People's Front of Iceland	R	110	0.47%	0	0	0
Valid votes		23,611	100.00%	9	1	10
Blank votes		736	3.02%			
Rejected votes – other		62	0.25%			
Total polled		24,409	82.41%			
Registered electors		29,620				

The following candidates were elected:

- Constituency seats - Anna Kolbrún Árnadóttir (M), 3,292.50 votes; Bjarkey Gunnarsdóttir (V), 3,582.50 votes; Kristján Þór Júlíusson (D), 4,736.25 votes; Líneik Anna Sævarsdóttir (B), 2,530.25 votes; Logi Már Einarsson (S), 3,268.00 votes; Njáll Trausti Friðbertsson (D), 3,585.25 votes; Sigmundur Davíð Gunnlaugsson (M), 4,368.00 votes; Steingrímur J. Sigfússon (V), 4,450.00 votes; and Þórunn Egilsdóttir (B), 3,369.50 votes.
- Compensatory seats - Albertína Friðbjörg Elíasdóttir (S), 2,454.75 votes.

===== 2016 =====
Results of the 2016 parliamentary election held on 29 October 2016:

Party		Votes	%	Seats		
Party		Votes	%	Con.	Com.	Tot.
Independence Party	D	6,014	26.49%	3	0	3
Progressive Party	B	4,542	20.01%	2	0	2
Left-Green Movement	V	4,539	19.99%	2	0	2
Pirate Party	P	2,265	9.98%	1	0	1
Social Democratic Alliance	S	1,816	8.00%	1	0	1
Viðreisn	C	1,482	6.53%	0	1	1
Bright Future	A	774	3.41%	0	0	0
People's Party	F	645	2.84%	0	0	0
Dawn	T	415	1.83%	0	0	0
People's Front of Iceland	R	211	0.93%	0	0	0
Valid votes		22,703	100.00%	9	1	10
Blank votes		839	3.55%			
Rejected votes – other		71	0.30%			
Total polled		23,613	79.87%			
Registered electors		29,564				

The following candidates were elected:

- Constituency seats - Bjarkey Gunnarsdóttir (V), 3,433.50 votes; Einar Aðalsteinn Brynjólfsson (P), 2,258.67 votes; Kristján Þór Júlíusson (D), 5,958.83 votes; Logi Már Einarsson (S), 1,800.67 votes; Njáll Trausti Friðbertsson (D), 4,997.00 votes; Sigmundur Davíð Gunnlaugsson (B), 3,729.50 votes; Steingrímur J. Sigfússon (V), 4,392.00 votes; Valgerður Gunnarsdóttir (D), 4,006.83 votes; and Þórunn Egilsdóttir (B), 3,564.25 votes.
- Compensatory seats - Benedikt Jóhannesson (C), 1,467.33 votes.

===== 2013 =====
Results of the 2013 parliamentary election held on 27 April 2013:

Party		Votes	%	Seats		
Party		Votes	%	Con.	Com.	Tot.
Progressive Party	B	8,173	34.62%	4	0	4
Independence Party	D	5,327	22.57%	2	0	2
Left-Green Movement	V	3,733	15.81%	2	0	2
Social Democratic Alliance	S	2,505	10.61%	1	0	1
Bright Future	A	1,537	6.51%	0	1	1
Pirate Party	Þ	716	3.03%	0	0	0
Dawn	T	460	1.95%	0	0	0
Iceland Democratic Party	L	313	1.33%	0	0	0
Rainbow	J	306	1.30%	0	0	0
Right-Green People's Party	G	296	1.25%	0	0	0
Households Party	I	241	1.02%	0	0	0
Valid votes		23,607	100.00%	9	1	10
Blank votes		569	2.35%			
Rejected votes – other		51	0.21%			
Total polled		24,227	83.44%			
Registered electors		29,035				

The following candidates were elected:

- Constituency seats - Bjarkey Gunnarsdóttir (V), 2,795.0 votes; Höskuldur Þórhallsson (B), 7,119.1 votes; Kristján L. Möller (S), 2,484.7 votes; Kristján Þór Júlíusson (D), 5,295.5 votes; Líneik Anna Sævarsdóttir (B), 6,133.3 votes; Sigmundur Davíð Gunnlaugsson (B), 8,129.6 votes; Steingrímur J. Sigfússon (V), 3,716.8 votes; Valgerður Gunnarsdóttir (D), 3,996.3 votes; and Þórunn Egilsdóttir (B), 5,116.9 votes.
- Compensatory seats - Brynhildur Pétursdóttir (A), 1,536.0 votes.

==== 2000s ====
===== 2009 =====
Results of the 2009 parliamentary election held on 25 April 2009:

Party		Votes	%	Seats		
Party		Votes	%	Con.	Com.	Tot.
Left-Green Movement	V	6,937	29.69%	3	0	3
Progressive Party	B	5,905	25.27%	2	0	2
Social Democratic Alliance	S	5,312	22.73%	2	1	3
Independence Party	D	4,079	17.46%	2	0	2
Citizens' Movement	O	690	2.95%	0	0	0
Liberal Party	F	384	1.64%	0	0	0
Democracy Movement	P	61	0.26%	0	0	0
Valid votes		23,368	100.00%	9	1	10
Blank votes		826	3.41%			
Rejected votes – other		55	0.23%			
Total polled		24,249	85.53%			
Registered electors		28,352				

The following candidates were elected:

- Constituency seats - Birkir Jón Jónsson (B), 5,600.2 votes; Björn Valur Gíslason (V), 4,615.5 votes; Höskuldur Þórhallsson (B), 4,495.0 votes; Kristján L. Möller (S), 5,066.5 votes; Kristján Þór Júlíusson (D), 3,763.5 votes; Sigmundur Ernir Rúnarsson (S), 4,331.2 votes; Steingrímur J. Sigfússon (V), 6,925.5 votes; Tryggvi Þór Herbertsson (D), 3,017.5 votes; and Þuríður Backman (V), 5,675.0 votes.
- Compensatory seats - Jónína Rós Guðmundsdóttir (S), 3,557.3 votes.

===== 2007 =====
Results of the 2007 parliamentary election held on 12 May 2007:

Party		Votes	%	Seats		
Party		Votes	%	Con.	Com.	Tot.
Independence Party	D	6,522	27.99%	3	0	3
Progressive Party	B	5,726	24.57%	2	1	3
Social Democratic Alliance	S	4,840	20.77%	2	0	2
Left-Green Movement	V	4,558	19.56%	2	0	2
Liberal Party	F	1,378	5.91%	0	0	0
Icelandic Movement – Living Country	I	278	1.19%	0	0	0
Valid votes		23,302	100.00%	9	1	10
Blank votes		305	1.29%			
Rejected votes – other		37	0.16%			
Total polled		23,644	84.80%			
Registered electors		27,881				

The following candidates were elected:

- Constituency seats - Arnbjörg Sveinsdóttir (D), 5,412.0 votes; Birkir Jón Jónsson (B), 4,760.8 votes; Einar Már Sigurðarson (S), 3,621.0 votes; Kristján L. Möller (S), 4,798.7 votes; Kristján Þór Júlíusson (D), 6,432.7 votes; Ólöf Nordal (D), 4,358.5 votes; Steingrímur J. Sigfússon (V), 4,552.7 votes; Valgerður Sverrisdóttir (B), 5,628.2 votes; and Þuríður Backman (V), 3,401.5 votes.
- Compensatory seats - Höskuldur Þórhallsson (B), 3,833.3 votes.

===== 2003 =====
Results of the 2003 parliamentary election held on 10 May 2003:

Party		Votes	%	Seats		
Party		Votes	%	Con.	Com.	Tot.
Progressive Party	B	7,722	32.77%	4	0	4
Independence Party	D	5,544	23.53%	2	0	2
Social Democratic Alliance	S	5,503	23.35%	2	0	2
Left-Green Movement	U	3,329	14.13%	1	1	2
Liberal Party	F	1,329	5.64%	0	0	0
New Force	N	136	0.58%	0	0	0
Valid votes		23,563	100.00%	9	1	10
Blank votes		256	1.07%			
Rejected votes – other		58	0.24%			
Total polled		23,877	87.47%			
Registered electors		27,298				

The following candidates were elected:

- Constituency seats - Birkir Jón Jónsson (B), 4,823.5 votes; Dagný Jónsdóttir (B), 5,792.9 votes; Einar Már Sigurðarson (S), 4,121.2 votes; Halldór Blöndal (D), 5,325.5 votes; Jón Kristjánsson (B), 6,737.0 votes; Kristján L. Möller (S), 5,462.2 votes; Steingrímur J. Sigfússon (U), 3,329.0 votes; Tómas Ingi Olrich (D), 4,036.0 votes; and Valgerður Sverrisdóttir (B), 7,646.0 votes.
- Compensatory seats - Þuríður Backman (U), 2,492.0 votes.
