= Ingibjörg Ólöf Isaksen =

Icelandic politician (born 1977)

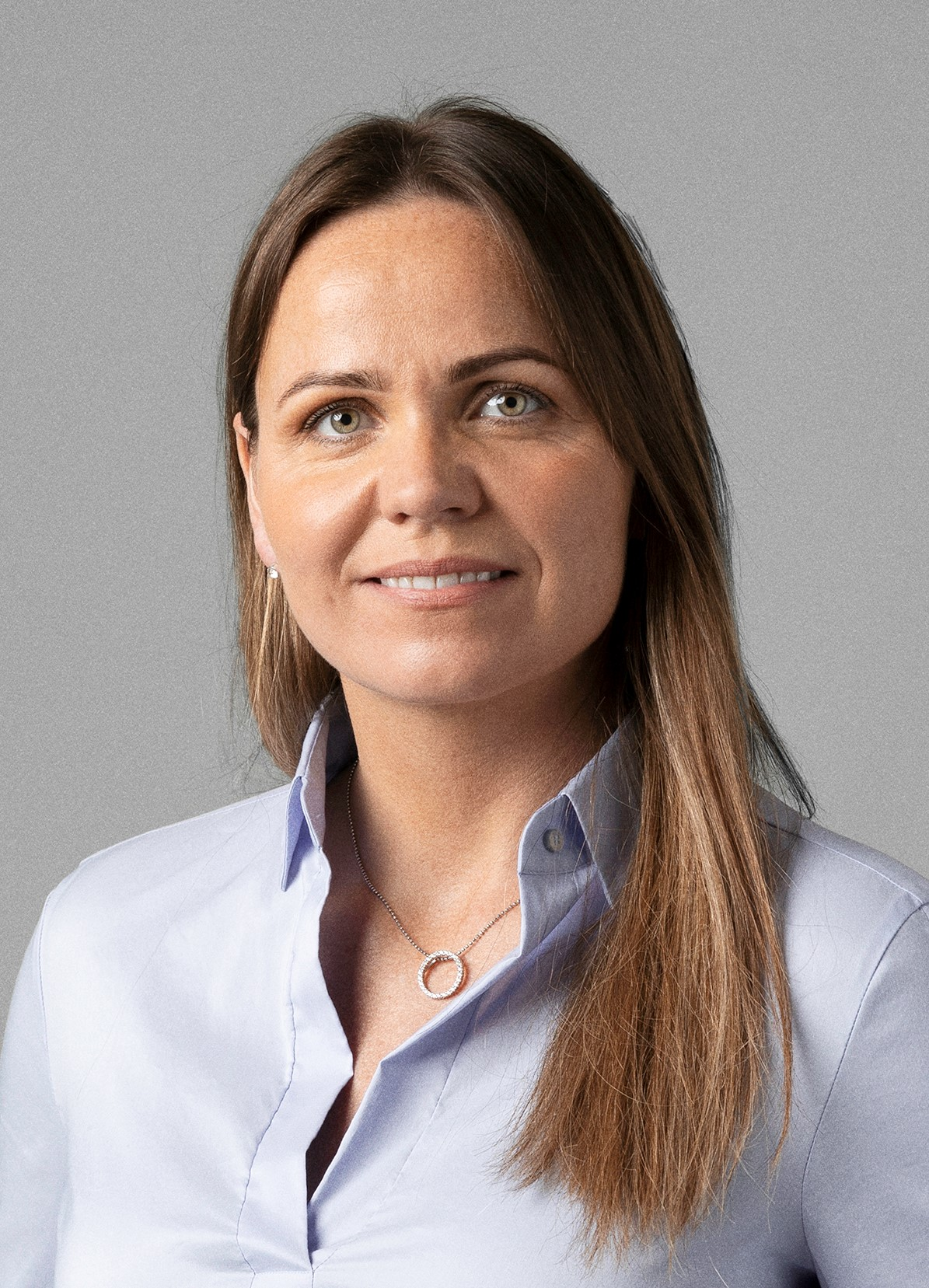
- Ingibjörg Isaksen in 2021

Member of the Althing
- Incumbent
- Assumed office 2021
- Constituency: Northeast

Personal details
- Born: 14 February 1977 (age 49)
- Party: Progressive Party
- Spouse: Sigurjón Karel Rafnsson
- Children: 6
- Education: Iceland College of Education

Ingibjörg Ólöf Isaksen (born 14 February 1977) is an Icelandic politician. She was first elected to the Parliament of Iceland (Althing) for the Progressive Party in the 2021 parliamentary election in the Northeast constituency. She was re-elected in the 2024 parliamentary election.

Ingibjörg graduated with a matriculation examination from Fjölbrautaskólinn í Breiðholti in 1997 and received a Bachelor of Science in sports science from the Iceland College of Education in 2003.

Ingibjörg worked as a teacher at Rimaskóli from 2003 to 2004, at Giljaskóli from 2004 to 2005 and at Brekkuskóli from 2005 to 2012. She served on the Eyjafjarðarsveitar municipal council from 2012 to 2014 and on the Akureyri municipal council from 2014 to 2021. During that time, she was the chairwoman of the Akureyri Sports Council from 2014 to 2017. She also served on the board of Norðurorka from 2014 to 2021 and was its chairwoman for the last two years. From 2018 to 2021, she was the managing director of the Akureyri Medical Center.

Ingibjörg ran in the Progressive Party's primary election in the Northeast Constituency for the 2021 Icelandic parliamentary election and was victorious in the fight for the party's leadership seat against incumbent MP Líneik Önnu Sævarsdóttur.

== See also ==
- List of members of the Althing, 2021–2024
- List of members of the Althing, 2024–2028
