= Þórarinn Ingi Pétursson =

Icelandic politician (born 1972)

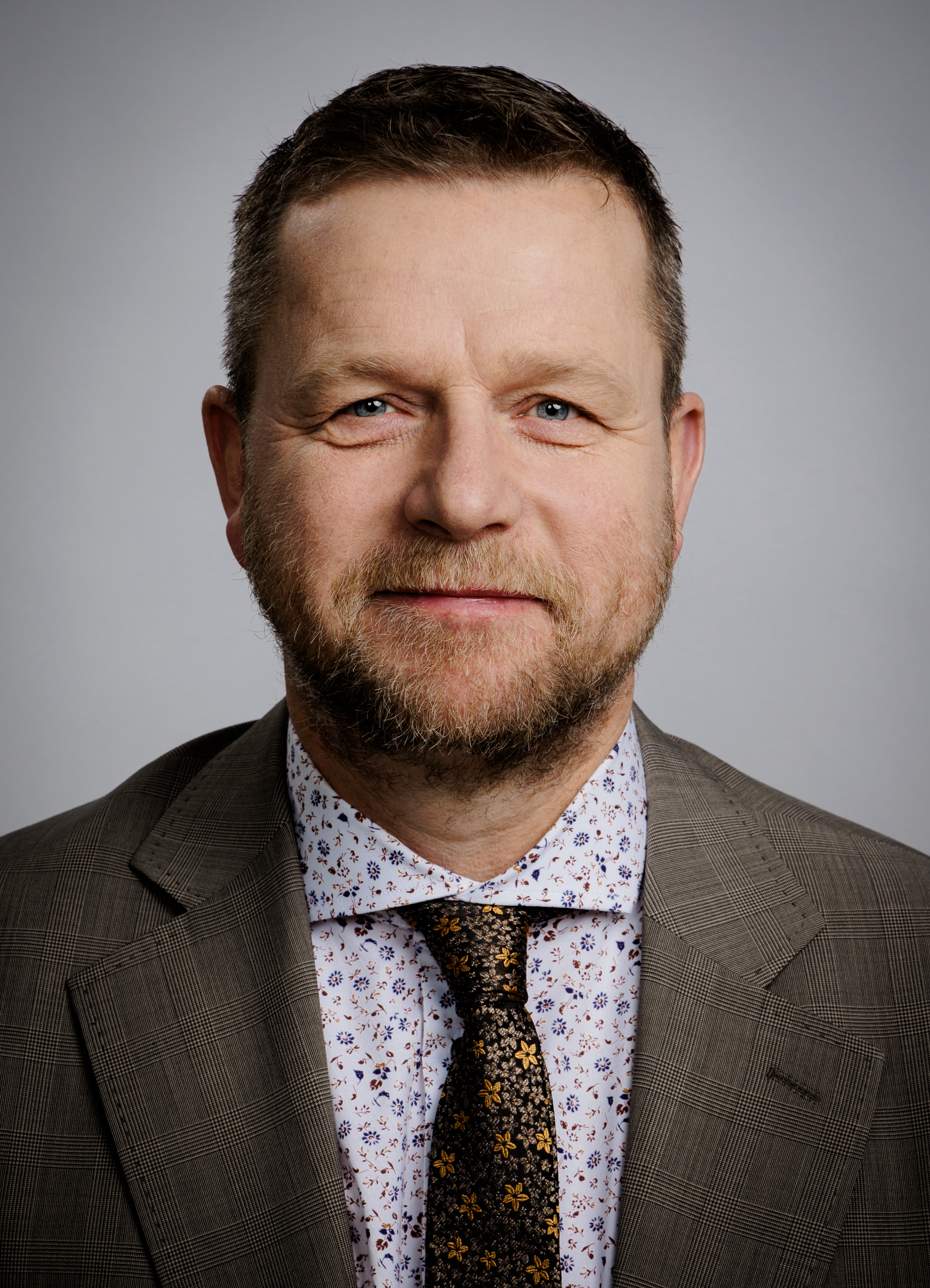
- Þórarinn Ingi Pétursson in 2021

Member of the Althing
- Incumbent
- Assumed office 2021
- Constituency: Northeast

Personal details
- Born: 22 August 1972 (age 53)
- Party: Progressive Party
- Spouse: Holmfridur Bjornsdottir
- Children: 3

Þórarinn Ingi Pétursson (born 22 August 1972) is an Icelandic politician from the Progressive Party. He is a member of the Icelandic Parliament in the Northeast Constituency. He was the first deputy of the Progressive Party in the Northeast Constituency after the 2017 Icelandic parliamentary election and served as a deputy several times, becoming the 9th MP for the constituency upon the death of Þórunn Egilsdóttir on 9 July 2021. He was then elected to the Parliament in the 2021 election. He was re-elected in 2024.

In Parliament he is chairman of the Agriculture Committee.

Þórarinn has been a sheep farmer since 1994, graduating as an agricultural engineer from Hólaskóli the same year. He was chairman of the National Sheep Farmers' Association 2012–2016.

== See also ==
- List of members of the Althing, 2021–2024
- List of members of the Althing, 2024–2028
