= Sigurjón =

Sigurjón is a masculine Icelandic given name. Notable people with the name include:

- Sigurjón Brink (1974–2011), also known as Sjonni Brink, an Icelandic musician and singer
- Sigurjón Kjartansson (born 1968), Icelandic writer and producer
- Sigurjón Pétursson (1888–1955), Icelandic wrestler
- Sigurjón Sighvatsson (born 1952), Icelandic film producer and businessman
- Sigurjón Birgir Sigurðsson (born 1962), known as Sjón, Icelandic author and poet
- Sigurjón Þórðarson (born 1964), Icelandic politician
