= Þorgrímur Sigmundsson =

Icelandic politician

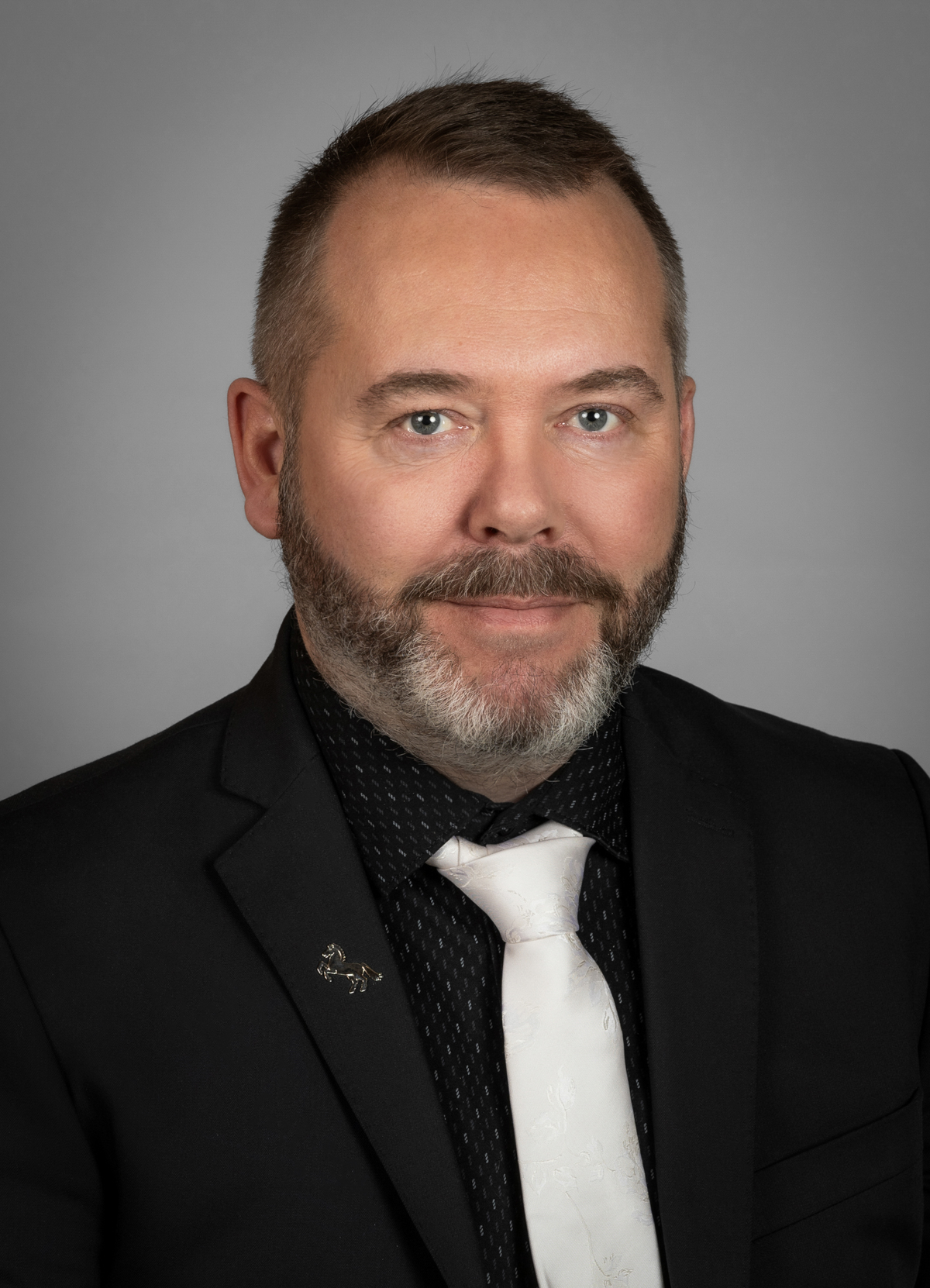

Member of the Althing
- Incumbent
- Assumed office 2024
- Constituency: Northeast

Personal details
- Born: April 18, 1976 (age 49)
- Party: Centre Party (Iceland)

Þorgrímur Sigmundsson is an Icelandic politician from the Centre Party. In the 2024 Icelandic parliamentary election he was elected to the Althing.

== See also ==
- List of members of the Althing, 2021–2024
- List of members of the Althing, 2024–2028
