= Jens Garðar Helgason =

Icelandic politician (born 1976)

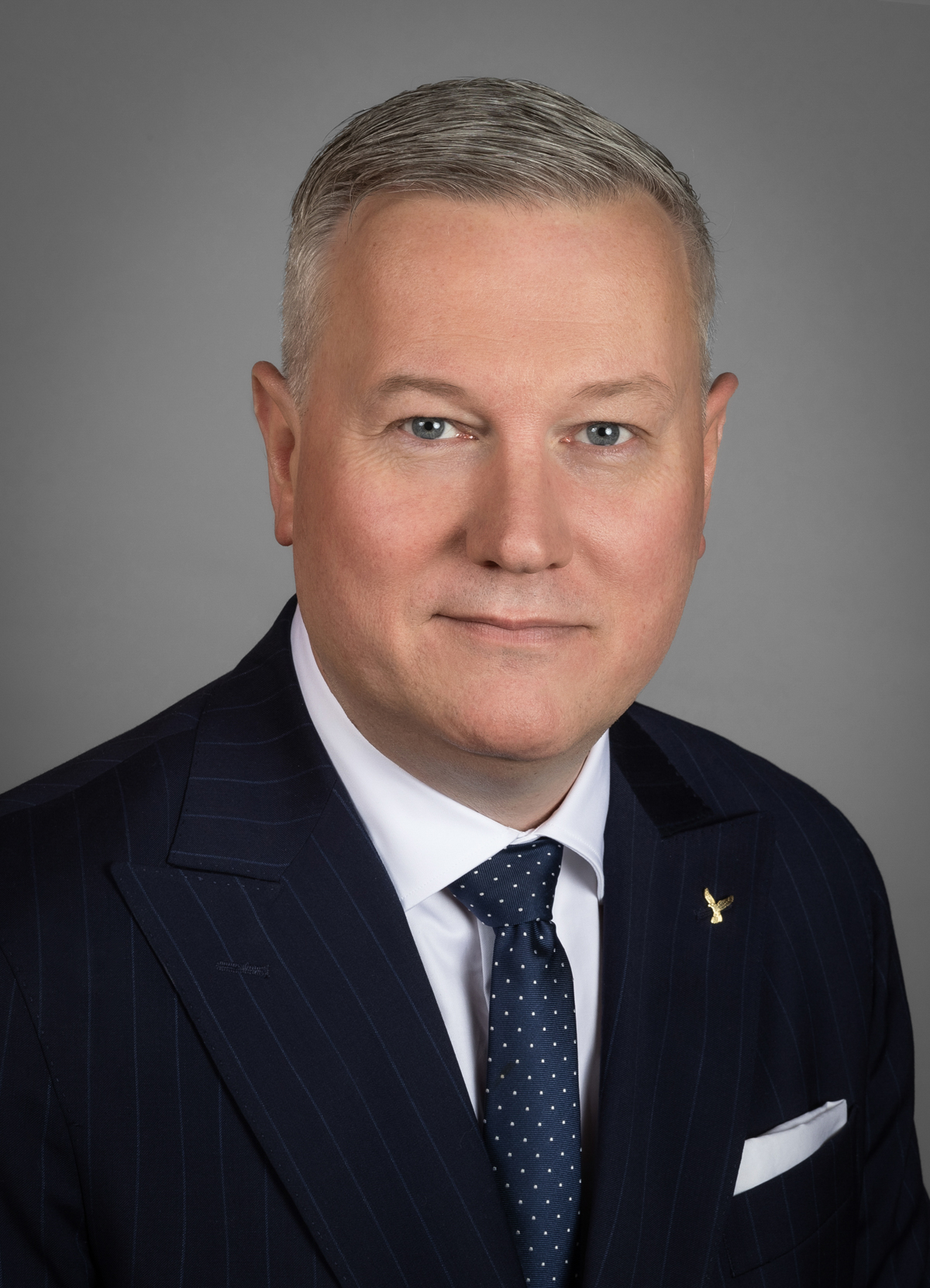

Member of the Althing
- Incumbent
- Assumed office 30 November 2024
- Constituency: Northeast

Personal details
- Born: 15 December 1976 (age 49) Eskifjörður, Iceland
- Party: Independence
- Education: University of Iceland; Norwegian School of Economics

Jens Garðar Helgason (born 15 December 1976) is an Icelandic politician. He is a member of the Icelandic Parliament for the Independence Party after leading list in the Northeast constituency for the 2024 Icelandic parliamentary election.

Jens was born and raised in Eskifjörður. He was a student at Akureyri Junior College, studied business administration at the University of Iceland and holds an MBA from the Norwegian School of Economics. Jens was chairman of the Fjarðabyggð municipal council from 2010 to 2018, he was chairman of the Association of Icelandic Fisheries Companies from 2014 to 2020 and vice chairman of the Confederation of Icelandic Employers from 2017 to 2020. Jens ran for the first place for the Independence Party for the 2024 Icelandic parliamentary election and performed better than the incumbent leader of the party in the constituency, Njáll Trausti Friðbertsson, when ranked first on the candidate list at the constituency assembly on 20 October 2024.

He was elected deputy chair of the Independence Party in early March 2025.

== See also ==
- List of members of the Althing, 2024–2028
