= Óttarsson =

Óttarsson is a patronym. It may refer to:

- Hallfreðr Óttarsson (c. 965 – c. 1007), also known as Hallfreðr vandræðaskáld (Troublesome Poet) Icelandic skald (poet)
- Ásbjörn Óttarsson (born 1962), Icelandic politician
- Guðlaugur Kristinn Óttarsson (born 1954), Icelandic guitar player, engineer, mathematician, inventor, lecturer
