= Einar Már Sigurðarson =

Icelandic politician (born 1951)

Member of Parliament
- In office 1999–2009

Deputy Speaker of the Parliament
- In office 2007–2009

Personal details
- Born: 29 October 1951 (age 74) Reykjavík, Iceland
- Party: Social Democratic Alliance
- Spouse: Helga Magnea Steinsson

Einar Már Sigurðarson (born 29 October 1951) is an Icelandic politician. He served as a member of the Althing (Iceland's parliament) from 1999 to 2009 for the Social Democratic Alliance, first as an MP for the Eastern constituency (1999–2003) and then for the Northeast constituency (2003–2009). He served as a Deputy Speaker of the Parliament during his last term from 2007 to 2009. Einar Már ran unsuccessfully in the SDA party primary elections in 2009 but lost his seat to former newscaster Sigmundur Ernir Rúnarsson and subsequently lost his seat in the 2009 parliamentary election.

After his career in politics, he returned to his profession as an educator, becoming the headmaster of a secondary school in Neskaupstaður. Sigurðarson currently serves as the president of the Coalition of Municipalities in East Iceland.
