= Tjörneshreppur =

Municipality in Iceland

- Municipality
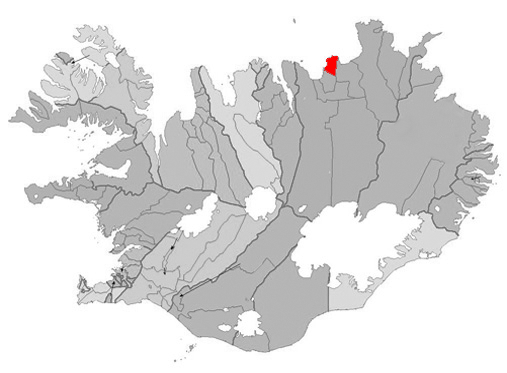
- Location of the municipality

- Location within Iceland
- Coordinates: 66°09′32″N 17°7′34″W
- Country: Iceland
- Region: Northeastern Region
- Constituency: Northeast Constituency

Area
  - Total: 199 km^{2} (77 sq mi)

Population
  - Total: 55
  - Density: 0.46/km^{2} (1.2/sq mi)
- Municipal number: 6611
- Website: tjorneshreppur.is

Tjörneshreppur (Icelandic pronunciation: [ˈtʰjœrˌnɛsˌr̥ɛhpʏr̥]) is a municipality in Iceland, part of the Norðurland eystra region. It is surrounded by the Norðurþing municipality on land, but has significant coastline. As of 1 January 2025, Tjörneshreppur had 53 inhabitants, making it the smallest municipality in Iceland.
