= Valgerður Gunnarsdóttir =

Icelandic politician

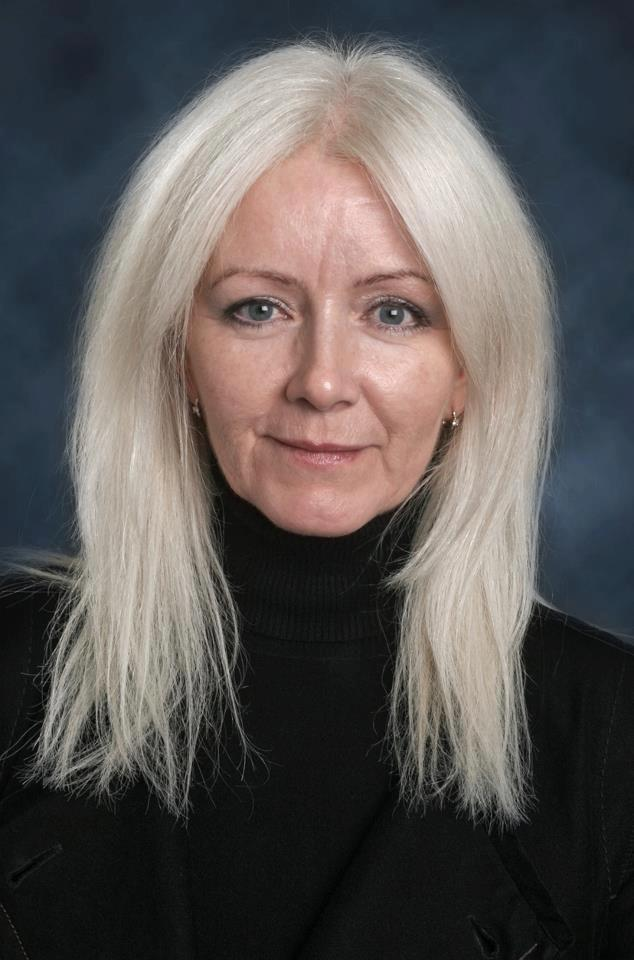

Member of Parliament
- Incumbent
- Assumed office 2013

Deputy Speaker of the Parliament
- Incumbent
- Assumed office 2013
- Prime Minister: Sigurður Ingi Jóhannsson; Sigmundur Davíð Gunnlaugsson

President of Húsavík town council
- In office 1994–1998

Personal details
- Born: 17 July 1955 (age 70) Dalvík, Iceland
- Party: Independence Party
- Spouse: Örlygur Hnefill Jónsson
- Children: Emilía Örlygsdóttir; Örlygur Hnefill Örlygsson; Gunnar Hnefill Örlygsson

Valgerður Gunnarsdóttir is an Icelandic politician, a member of the Icelandic parliament, and the former headmaster of Laugar Junior College. She was a member of Húsavík town council from 1986 to 1998 and served as the president of the town council from 1994 to 1998.

Valgerður has been a member of the Budget Committee since 2013 and a member of the Icelandic Delegation to the Nordic Council from the same year. She has been a member of the Parliamentary Assembly of the Council of Europe since 2016 and serves as deputy chairman for the Icelandic delegation.
