= Klaustur Affair =

Political scandal in Iceland in 2018

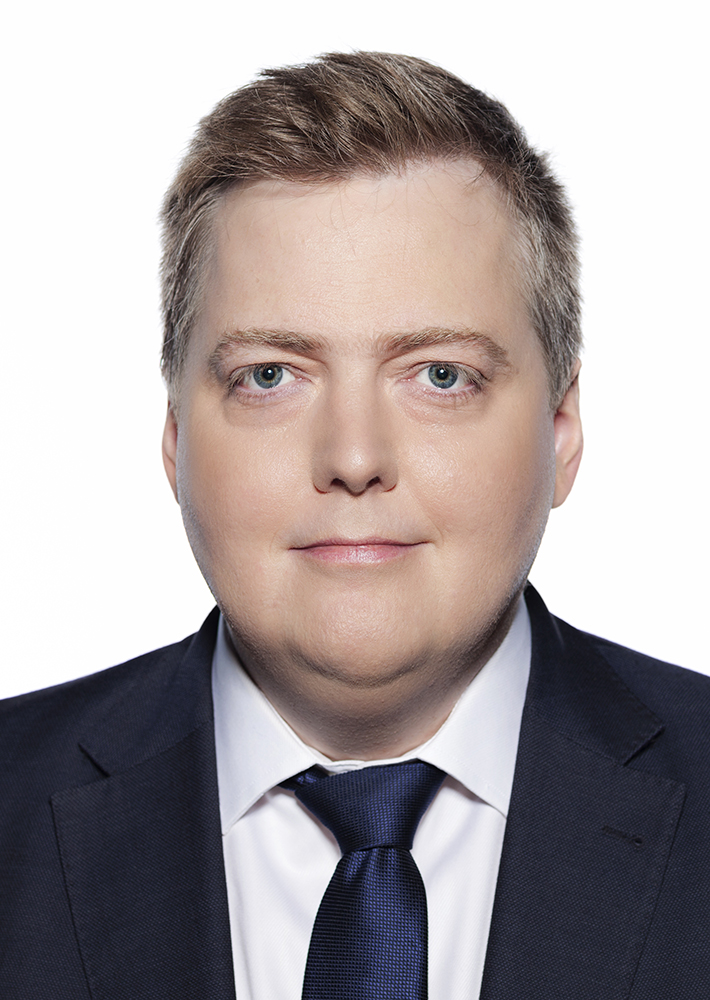
Sigmundur Davíð Gunnlaugsson in 2016.

The Klaustur Affair, also known in Iceland as Klaustur Recordings (Klaustursupptökurnar) or Klausturgate was a political scandal in Iceland triggered by audio recordings of a group Althing parliamentarians made without their knowledge at the Reykjavík bar Klaustur in late November, 2018. In the recordings, the parliamentarians make sexist remarks about some of their colleagues and discuss the appointment of an ambassador as a political favour.

== Events ==
Parliamentarian and former Prime Minister Sigmundur Davíð Gunnlaugsson from the Centre Party, his fellow caucus members Gunnar Bragi Sveinsson, Anna Kolbrún Árnadóttir and Bergþór Ólason, and Karl Gauti Hjaltason and Ólafur Ísleifsson of the People's Party met on the evening of 20 November 2018 at Klaustur. Bára Halldórsdóttir, another bar patron, recognized Sigmundur Davíð and began surreptitiously recording the group after overhearing them make sexist remarks about another parliamentarian. The group paid no attention to Bára. They noticed her as they prepared to leave, but thought she was a foreign tourist. Bára sent the recordings to the media under a pseudonym.

== Contents of the recordings ==
The group can be heard making insulting and misogynistic remarks about several female Icelandic government ministers, parliamentarians, and other politicians, as well as mocking the Me Too movement.

In addition, Gunnar Bragi can be heard discussing his appointment of Geir H. Haarde as ambassador to the United States in 2014. Gunnar Bragi says that he agreed to appoint Geir, a former Prime Minister of Iceland convicted of misconduct in office, in order to curry favor with the Independence Party and thereby receive an ambassadorial position himself in the future. He also states that he appointed then member of parliament of the Left-Green Movement, Árni Þór Sigurðsson, as ambassador to Finland in order to draw the public's attention away from Geir's appointment.

== Reaction ==
The scandal resulted in public protest, including the presentation of a list of demands to the Speaker of the Althing, Steingrímur J. Sigfússon, who apologized to the nation. Prime Minister Katrín Jakobsdóttir expressed disappointment with the parliamentarians and suggested that the scandal could damage the reputation of the Althing.

Several of the parliamentarians on the recording also issued public apologies. Karl Gauti Hjaltason and Ólafur Ísleifsson were expelled from the People's Party. Árni Þór Sigurðsson released a public statement denying any involvement in corrupt dealings and emphasizing his qualifications for the ambassadorship.
