= Ingvar Þóroddsson =

Icelandic politician

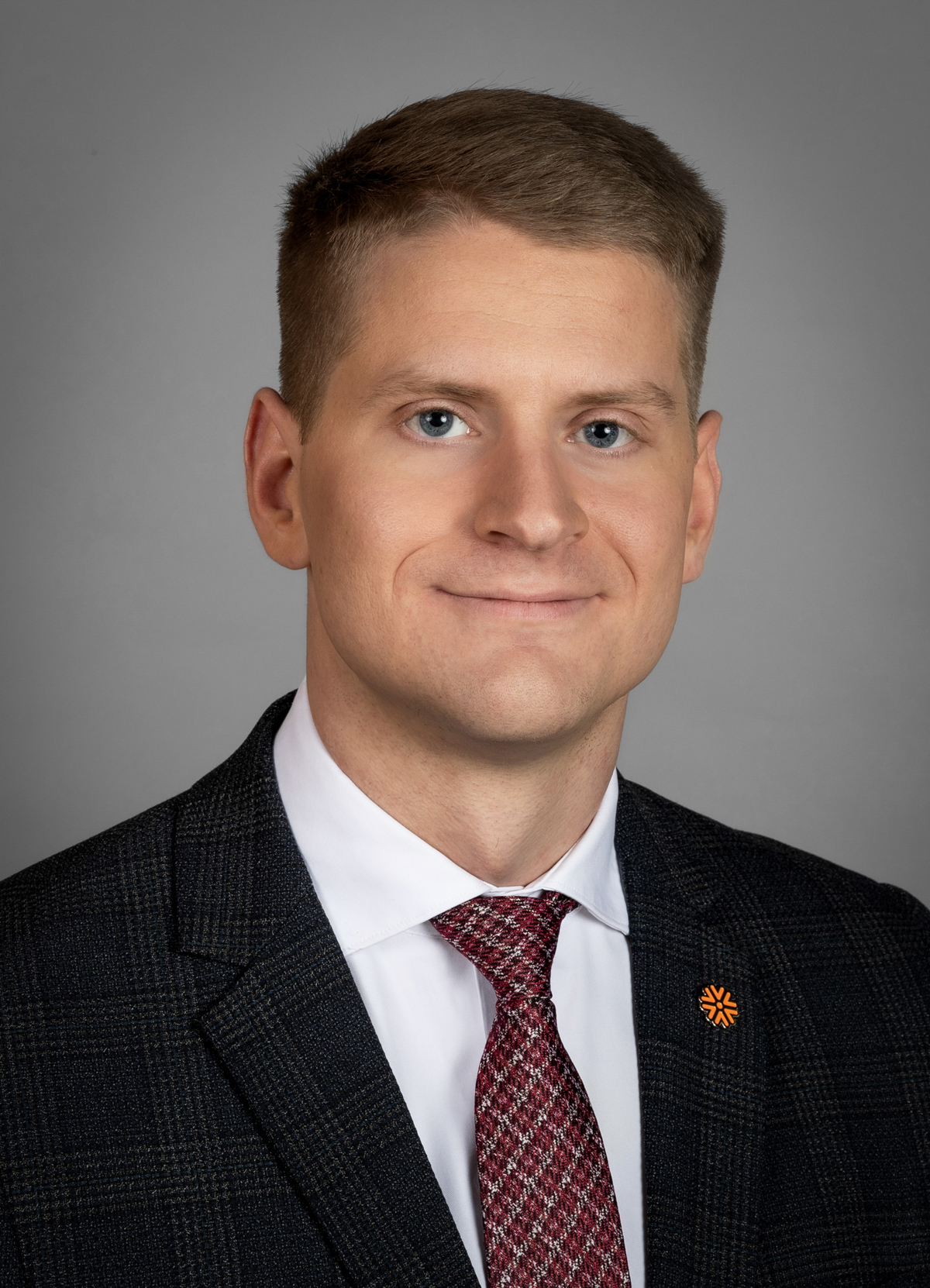

Member of the Althing
- Incumbent
- Assumed office 2024
- Constituency: Northeast

Personal details
- Party: Viðreisn

Ingvar Þóroddsson is an Icelandic politician from the Viðreisn until November 16th 2026, when he joined the Independence Party. In the 2024 Icelandic parliamentary election he was elected to the Althing.

He was a teacher at a secondary school in Akureyri. He is an engineer by profession.

== See also ==
- List of members of the Althing, 2024–2028
