= Eydís Ásbjörnsdóttir =

Icelandic politician (born 1973)

Eydís Ásbjörnsdóttir (EÁs)
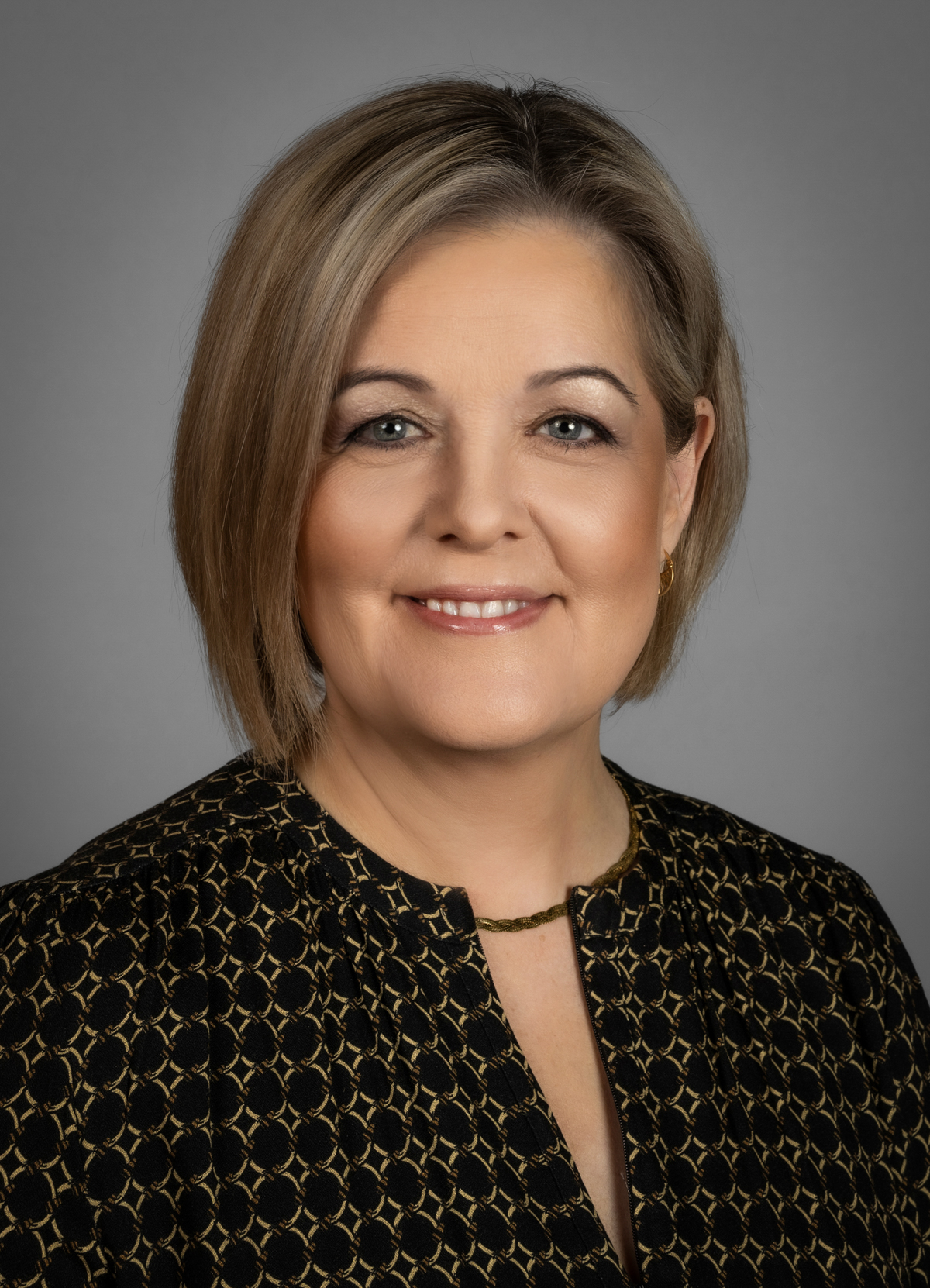

Member of the Althing
- Incumbent
- Assumed office 30 November 2024
- Constituency: Northeast

Personal details
- Born: 22 June 1973 (age 53)
- Party: Social Democratic Alliance
- Education: University of Akureyri
- Website: www.eydisasbjorns.is

Eydís Ásbjörnsdóttir (born 22 June 1973) is an Icelandic politician and member of the Althing. A member of the Social Democratic Alliance, she has represented the Northeast constituency since November 2024.

Eydís was born on 22 June 1973. She is from Eskifjörður. She completed her apprenticeship in hairdressing in 1998 and received a master's degree in hairdressing in 1999. She received a teaching qualification from the University of Akureyri (HA) in 2006. She started teaching at the East Iceland Vocational School in 1999. She became headmistress of the school in December 2022 after being appointed by Minister of Education and Children's Affairs Ásmundur Einar Daðason. She also runs a business.

Eydís was elected to the municipal council in Fjarðabyggð at the 2010 municipal elections as a candidate for the Fjarðalistan party. She was a substitute member of the Althing for Logi Már Einarsson in November 2022. She was elected to the Althing at the 2024 parliamentary election.
