= Bjarkey Gunnarsdóttir =

Icelandic politician

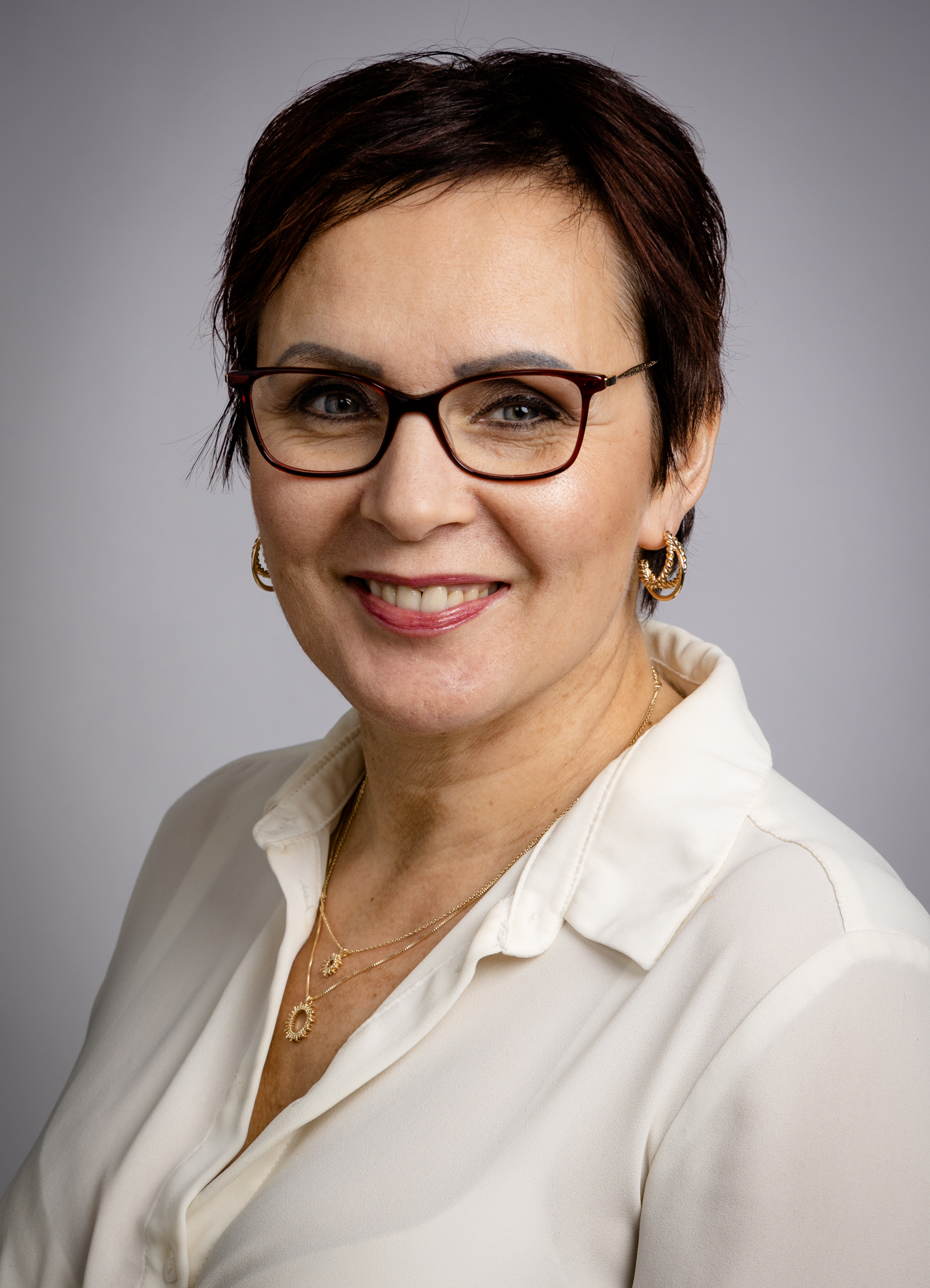

Minister of Food, Fisheries and Agriculture
- In office 9 April 2024 – 17 October 2024
- Prime Minister: Bjarni Benediktsson
- Preceded by: Svandís Svavarsdóttir
- Succeeded by: Bjarni Benediktsson

Member of the Althingi
- Incumbent
- Assumed office 27 April 2013
- Constituency: Northeast

Personal details
- Born: 27 February 1965 (age 61) Reykjavík, Iceland
- Party: Left-Green Movement
- Occupation: Politician
- Profession: Civil servant Teacher; Businessperson

Bjarkey Olsen Gunnarsdóttir is an Icelandic politician and lawmaker. She served as Minister of Food, Fisheries and Agriculture from April to October 2024 and has been member of the Althing since 2013, representing the North East.

== Political career ==
=== Parliament ===
Bjarkey was first elected to the Althing at the 2013 election for the Northeast constituency. She has been re-elected since.

=== Minister of Food, Fisheries and Agriculture ===
She was appointed minister of food, fisheries and agriculture on 9 April 2024 when Bjarni Benediktsson succeeded Katrín Jakobsdóttir as prime minister. She was succeeded by prime minister Bjarni Bendiktsson in the post after the Left-Green Movement withdrew from government after its collapse in October the same year.

Political offices
| Preceded by Svandís Svavarsdóttir | Minister of Food, Fisheries and Agriculture; 2024 | Succeeded by Bjarni Bendiktsson |
