= Sigurrós Þorgrímsdóttir =

Icelandic politician

Sigurrós Þorgrímsdóttir (born 16 April 1947) is an Icelandic politician, a former member of Alþingi and the current chairman of Breiðablik sports club.

She became a full member of Alþingi on October 1, 2005, having previously served in an interim capacity on occasions since 2003. She did not gain enough support during the primaries before the 2007 elections to obtain a secure seat and withdrew her candidacy.

She is a member of the Independence Party and holds various offices both on national level and in her hometown Kópavogur. She has been the president of the school board of Menntaskólinn í Kópavogi since 1998.
