= Albertína Friðbjörg Elíasdóttir =

Icelandic politician (born 1980)

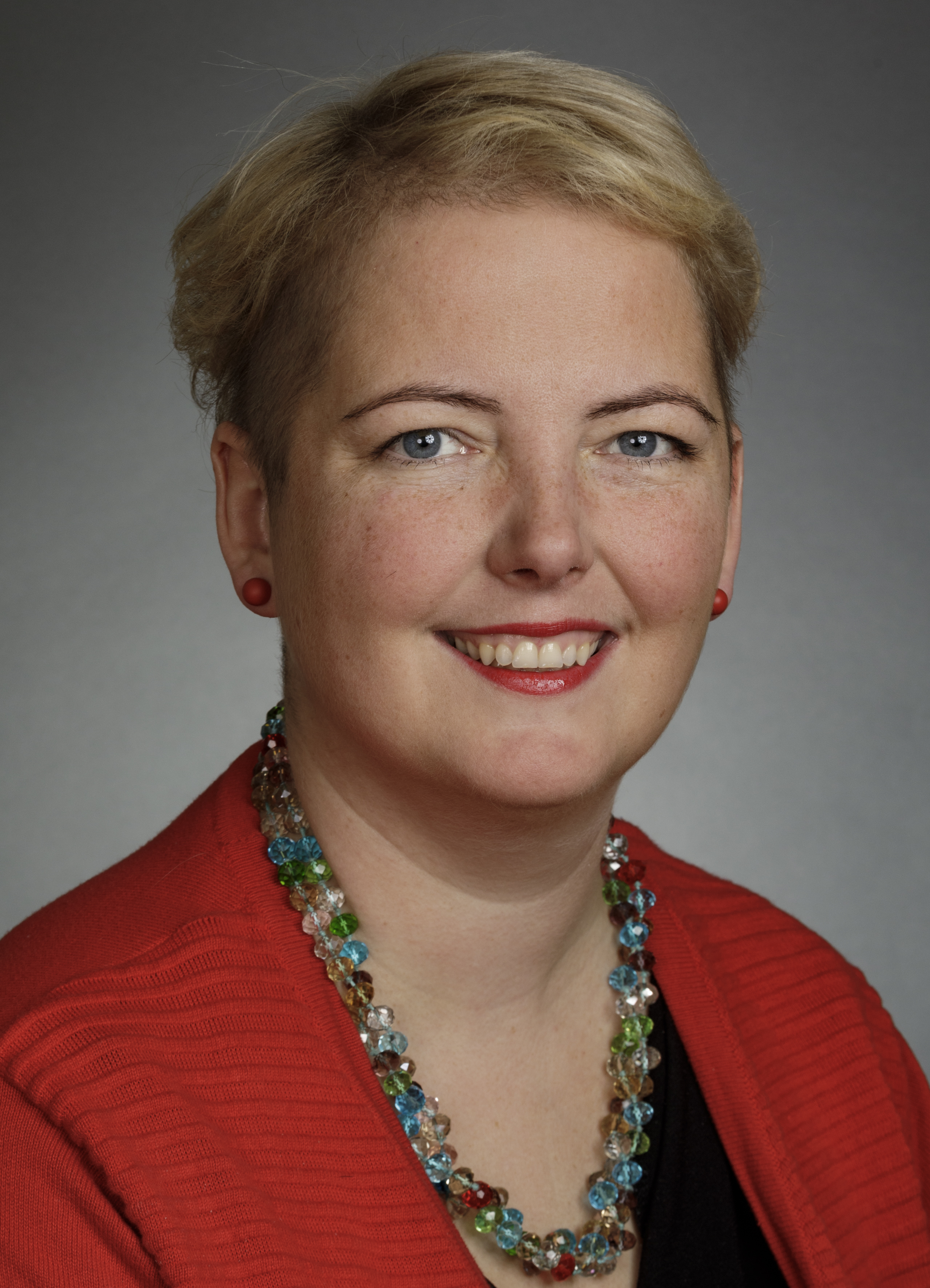
Albertína Friðbjörg Elíasdóttir 2017

Albertína Friðbjörg Elíasdóttir (born 17 February 1980 in Ísafjörður) is an Icelandic politician from the Social Democratic Alliance. She was a member of the Icelandic Parliament (Althing) from 2017 to 2021.

== Life ==
Albertína Friðbjörg Elíasdóttir has degrees in Sociology (B.Sc. from the University of Iceland 2005) and Geography (M.Sc. from the University of Iceland 2012) as well as a piano diploma from the Ísafjörður Music School. Among other things, she was a project manager at the Westfjords Economic Development Organization, Atvinnuþróunarfélag Vestfjarða, as well as a project manager and teacher at the University Center of the Westfjords. From 2016 to 2017 she was the managing director of the EIMUR PPP project to promote the use of geothermal energy in Northeast Iceland. She also served as organist for several churches in the Westfjords.

From 2010 to 2014, Albertína Friðbjörg was a member of the Ísafjarðarbær city council, and as its chairwoman in 2011 and 2013. In the parliamentary election on October 28, 2017, she was elected to the Althing as the Social Democratic Alliance's candidate for the Northeast constituency. As of the beginning of 2018, she was a member of the parliamentary committee for commercial affairs. In January 2021, Albertína Friðbjörg announced that she was pregnant with her first child and would no longer run in the 2021 Icelandic parliamentary election. She said working in parliament was “perhaps not very family-friendly”, especially since she lives in Akureyri and therefore has to travel a long way.
