= Ólafur Ísleifsson =

Icelandic politician

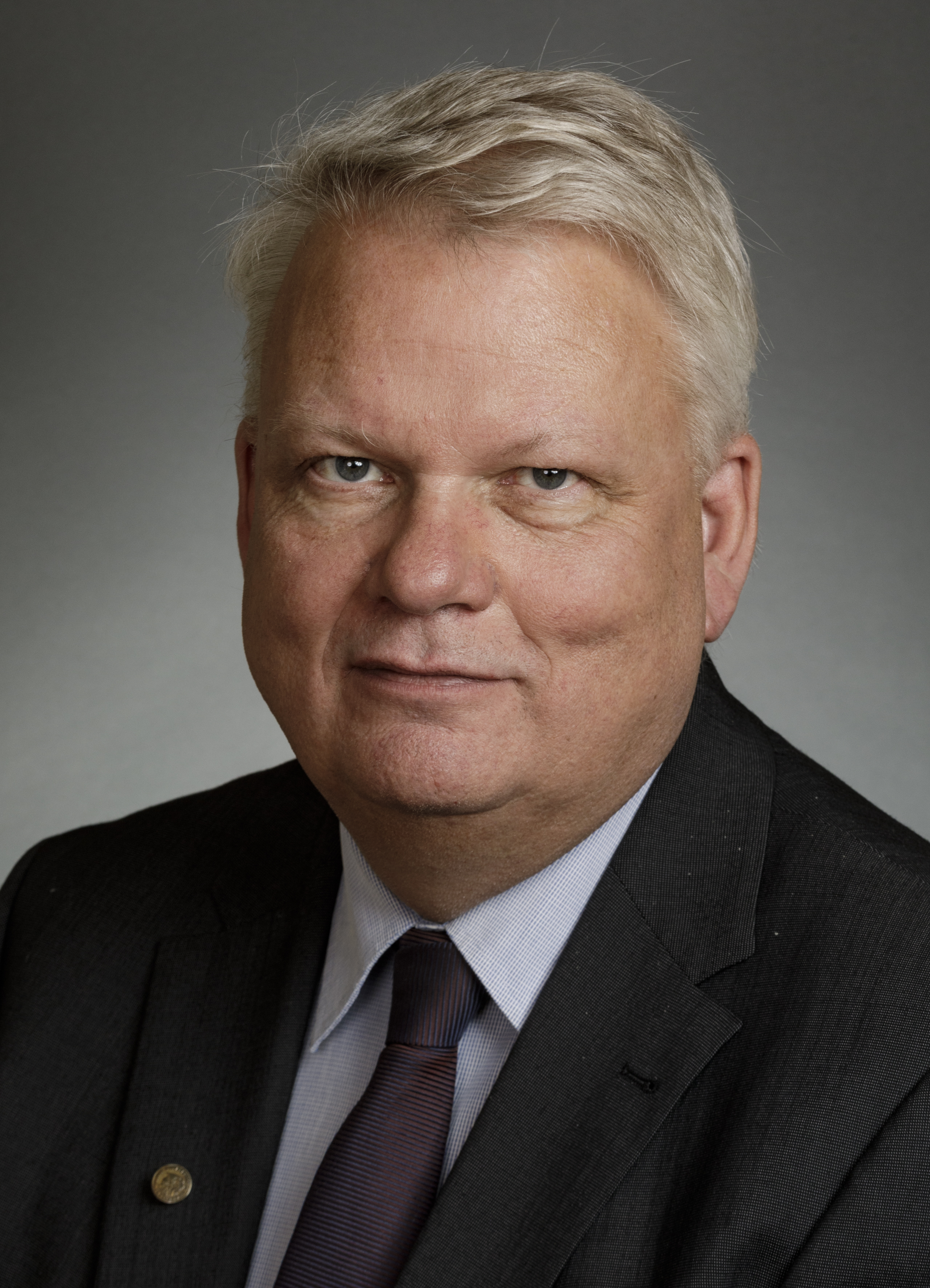

Ólafur Ísleifsson (born 10 February 1955 in Reykjavík) is an Icelandic economist and politician from the Centre Party. He has represented Reykjavik North in the Parliament of Iceland since 2017.

In 2018, Ísleifsson was involved in the Klaustur Affair.
