= National Electoral Commission of Iceland =

Icelandic electoral authority

National Electoral Commission
- Landskjörstjórn Íslands

Electoral Commission overview
- Headquarters: Reykjavík
- Electoral Commission executives: Kristín Edwald, Chairman; Þórir Haraldsson, Deputy Chairman
- Website: www.landskjor.is

The National Electoral Commission is the electoral commission of Iceland. It plays an important role in the preparation and execution of elections to Althing, the Parliament of Iceland. In addition it is responsible for apportioning seats to each constituency as decreed by law.
