= Sigurður Kári Kristjánsson =

Icelandic politician

Sigurður Kári Kristjánsson (born May 9, 1973) is an Icelandic Member of Parliament for the Independence Party (Sjálfstæðisflokkurinn).

Kristjánsson graduated with a law degree from the University of Iceland in 1998. He was chairman of The National Youth Organisation of the Independence Party (Samband ungra sjálfstæðismanna) from 1999 to 2001. He has served as Member of the Icelandic parliament Althing since the parliament elections in 2003 and as vice chairman of Heimssýn, the cross-political organisation of Icelandic Eurosceptics, since 2004.
