= Líneik Anna Sævarsdóttir =

Icelandic politician (born 1964)

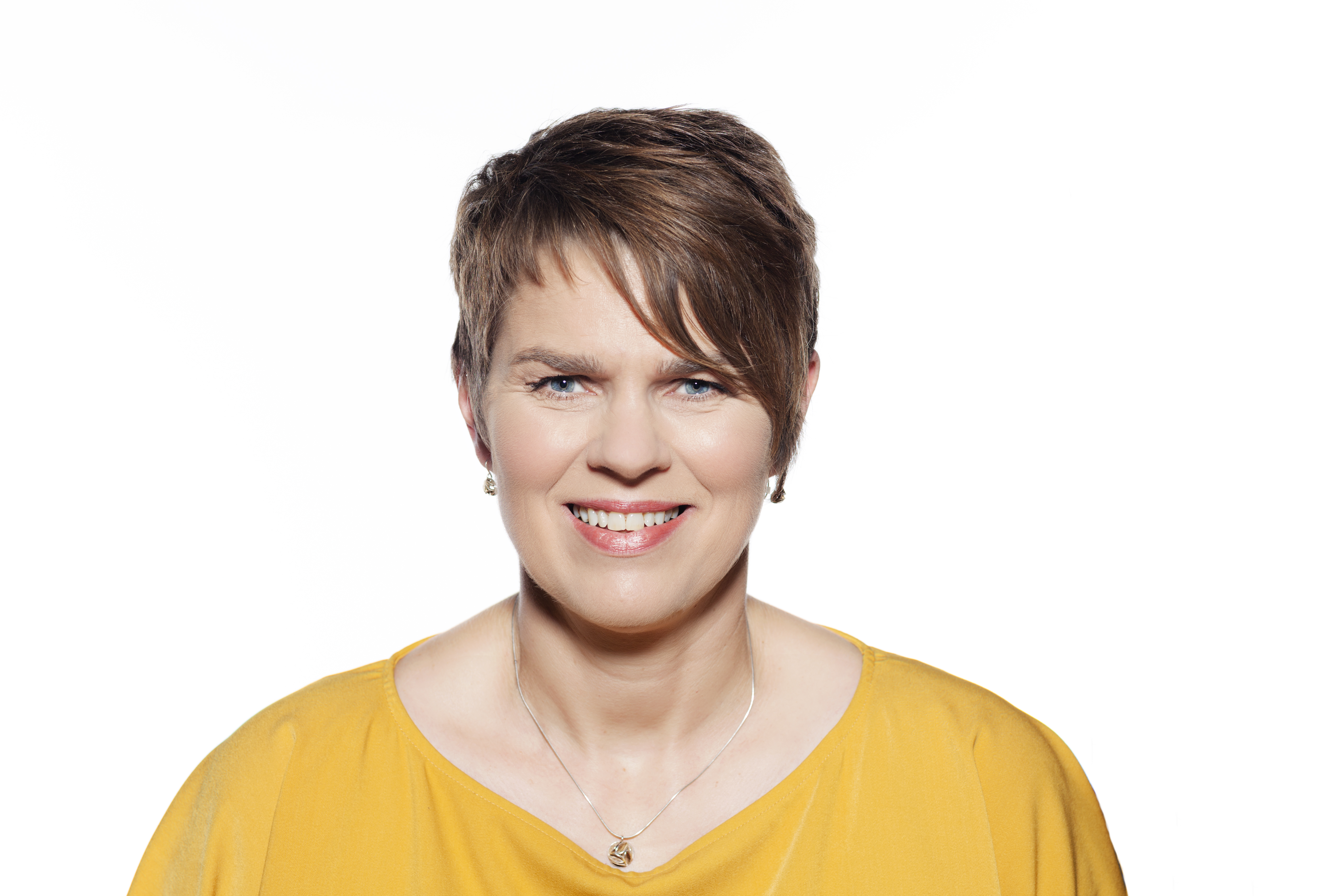

Personal details
- Born: 3 November 1964 (age 61) Reykjavík, Iceland
- Party: Progressive Party
- Children: Ásta Hlín (born 1989); Inga Sæbjörg (born 1991); Ásgeir Páll (born 2000); Jón Bragi (born 2000)
- Parent(s): Sævar Sigbjarnarson (born 1932); Ása Hafliðadóttir (1941-1998)
- Education: University of Iceland

Líneik Anna Sævarsdóttir (born 3 November 1964) is an Icelandic politician who is a member of the Althing (Iceland's parliament) for the Northeast Constituency since 2013 and she has also served as the Deputy Chairman of the Constitutional and Supervisory Committee since 2017.
