= Þórunn Egilsdóttir =

Icelandic politician (1964–2021)

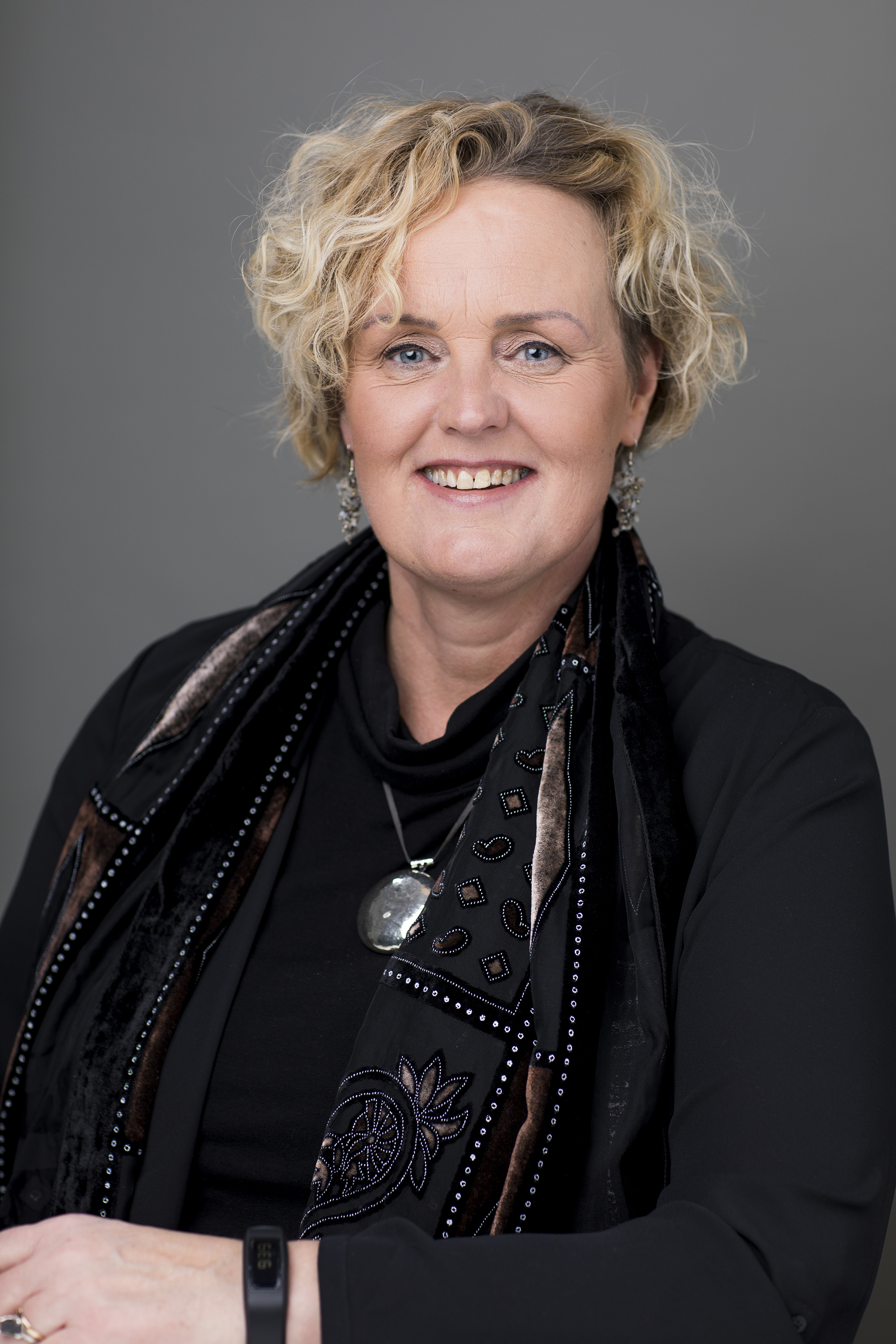
- Þórunn in 2016

Member of the Althing
- In office 27 April 2013 – 9 July 2021
- Constituency: Northeast

Personal details
- Born: 23 November 1964; Reykjavík, Iceland
- Died: 9 July 2021 (aged 56); Akureyri, Iceland
- Political party: Progressive Party
- Spouse: Friðbjörn Haukur Guðmundsson
- Education: University of Iceland (B.Ed)

Þórunn Egilsdóttir (Icelandic pronunciation: [ˈθouːrʏnː ˈeijɪlstouhtɪr̥]; 23 November 1964 – 9 July 2021) was an Icelandic politician who was a member of the Althing (Iceland's parliament) for the Northeast Constituency from 2013 until her death, and she also served as chairman of the parliamentary group of the Progressive Party since 2016.

Þórunn died from breast cancer at a hospital in Akureyri on 9 July 2021, aged 56.
