= Njáll Trausti Friðbertsson =

Icelandic politician (born 1969)

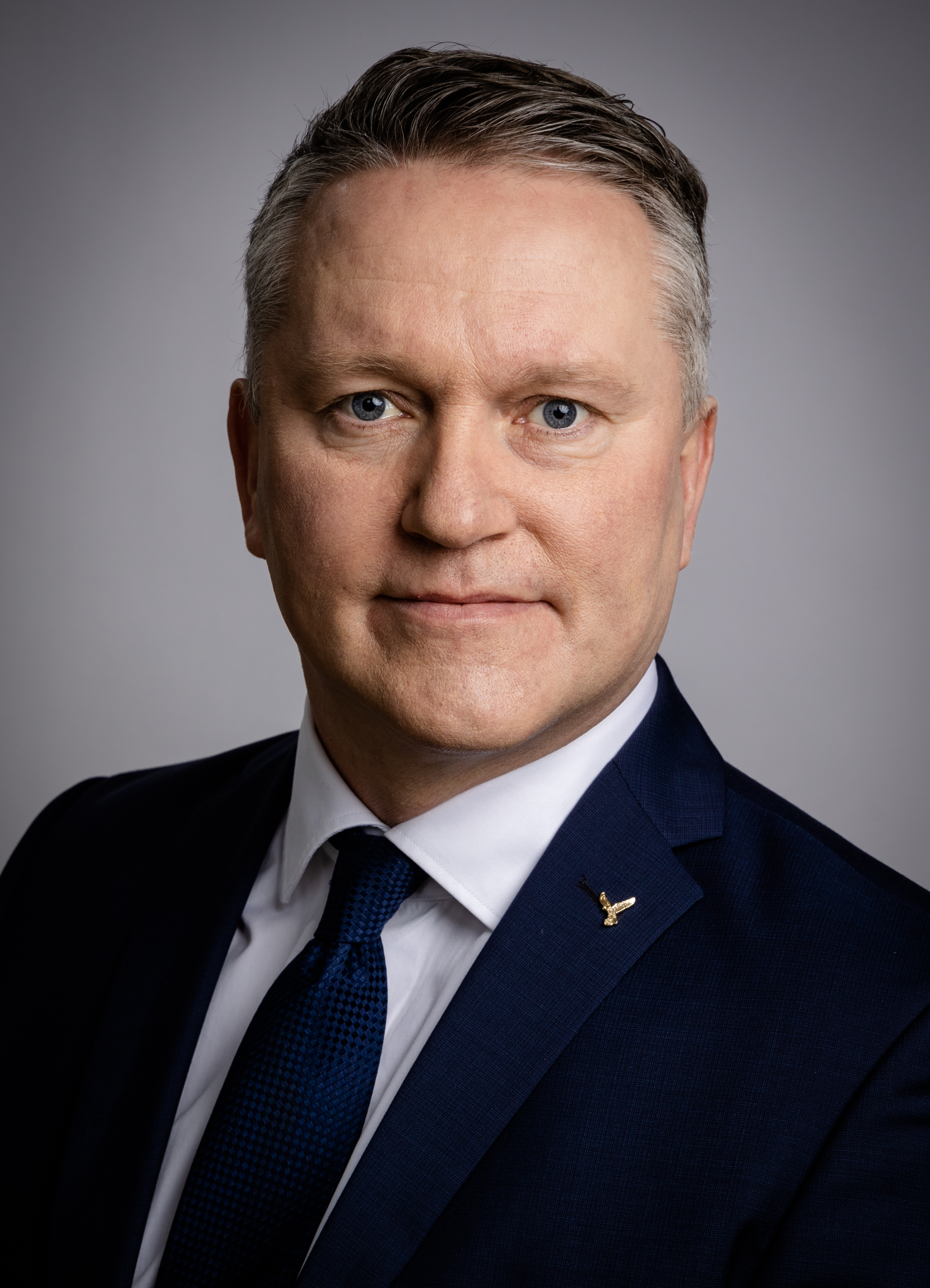
Njáll Trausti Friðbertsson 2021

Njáll Trausti Friðbertsson (born 31 December 1969) is an Icelandic Independence Party politician. He was elected to the Althing in 2016, by the Northeast constituency.

In 1994, Njáll won Draumaliðsdeildin, the Icelandic fantasy football competition hosted by Dagblaðið Vísir. Njáll credited watching a lot more of football that summer than he had done in the years before and also gave a mention to the points scored by former Yugoslavian striker Milos Tanasic.

Born in Reykjavík, he has been an air traffic controller in Akureyri since 1992. He graduated in Business Administration from the University of Akureyri in 2004. He and his wife Guðrún Gyða Hauksdóttir have two sons.
