= Anna Kolbrún Árnadóttir =

Icelandic politician (1970–2023)

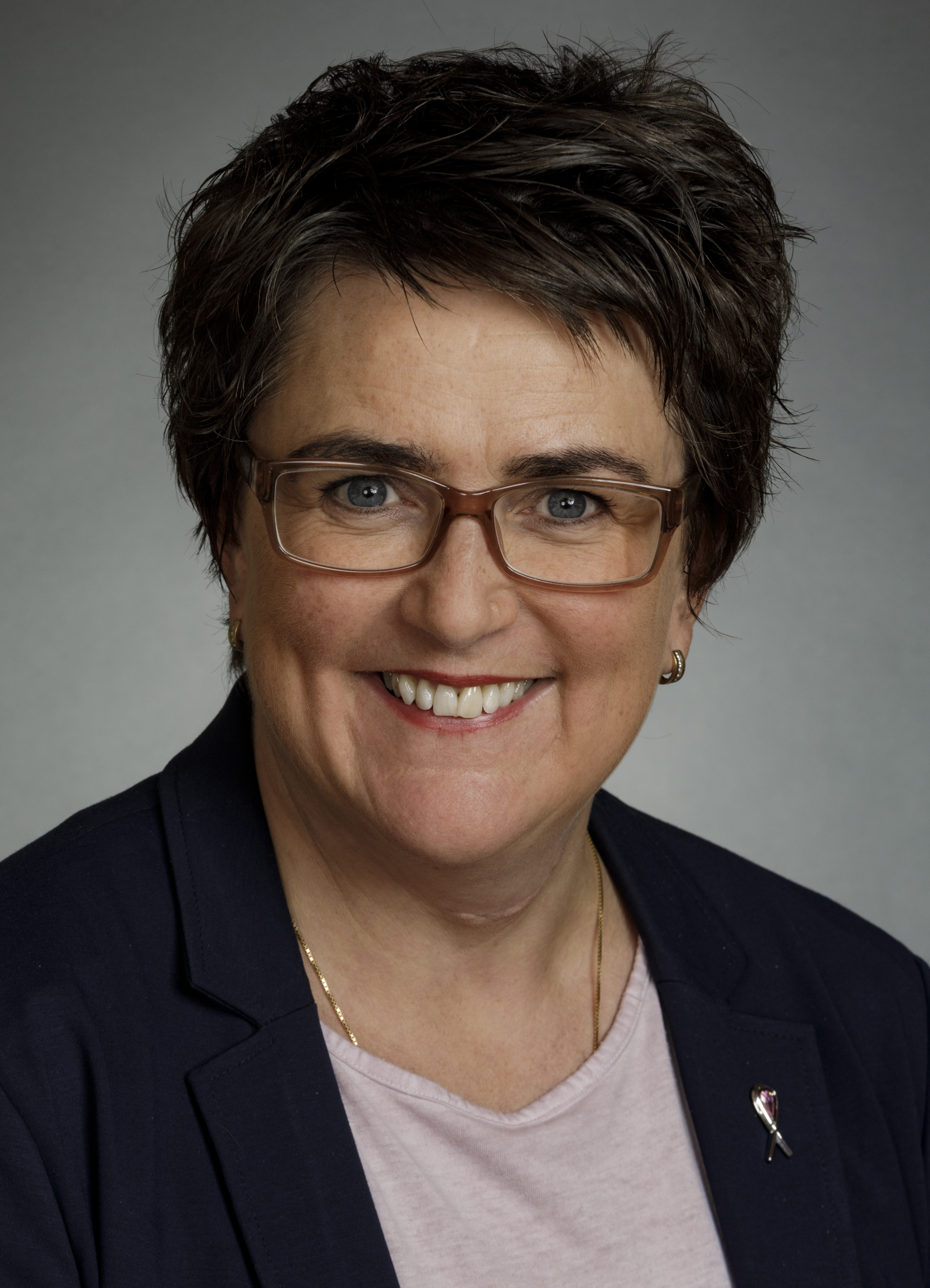

Member of Alþingi
- In office 2017–2021
- Constituency: Northwest

Personal details
- Born: 16 April 1970 Akureyri, Iceland
- Died: 9 May 2023 (aged 53) Akureyri, Iceland
- Party: Centre Party
- Education: Akureyri University

Anna Kolbrún Árnadóttir (16 April 1970 – 9 May 2023) was an Icelandic politician. She was a member of Alþingi from 2017 to 2021 as a member of the Centre Party. She served as a deputy member from 2021 until her death. Before becoming a member of Alþingi, she worked in health care and education.

Kolbrún Árnadóttir was one of the MPs who was part of the Klaustur Affair.

== Illness and death ==
Kolbrún Árnadóttir was diagnosed with a rare type of breast cancer in 2011. She died in Akureyri Hospital on 9 May 2023, at the age of 53.
