= Höskuldur Þórhallsson =

Icelandic politician

Member of the Althing
- In office 2007–2016
- Constituency: Northeast

Personal details
- Born: 8 May 1973 (age 52) Akureyri, Iceland
- Political party: Progressive

Höskuldur Þórhallsson (born 8 May 1973) is an Icelandic politician and a former member of the Althing, the Icelandic parliament. He is a member of the Progressive Party. He served as President of the Nordic Council in 2015.
