= Sigurjón Þórðarson =

Icelandic politician (born 1964)

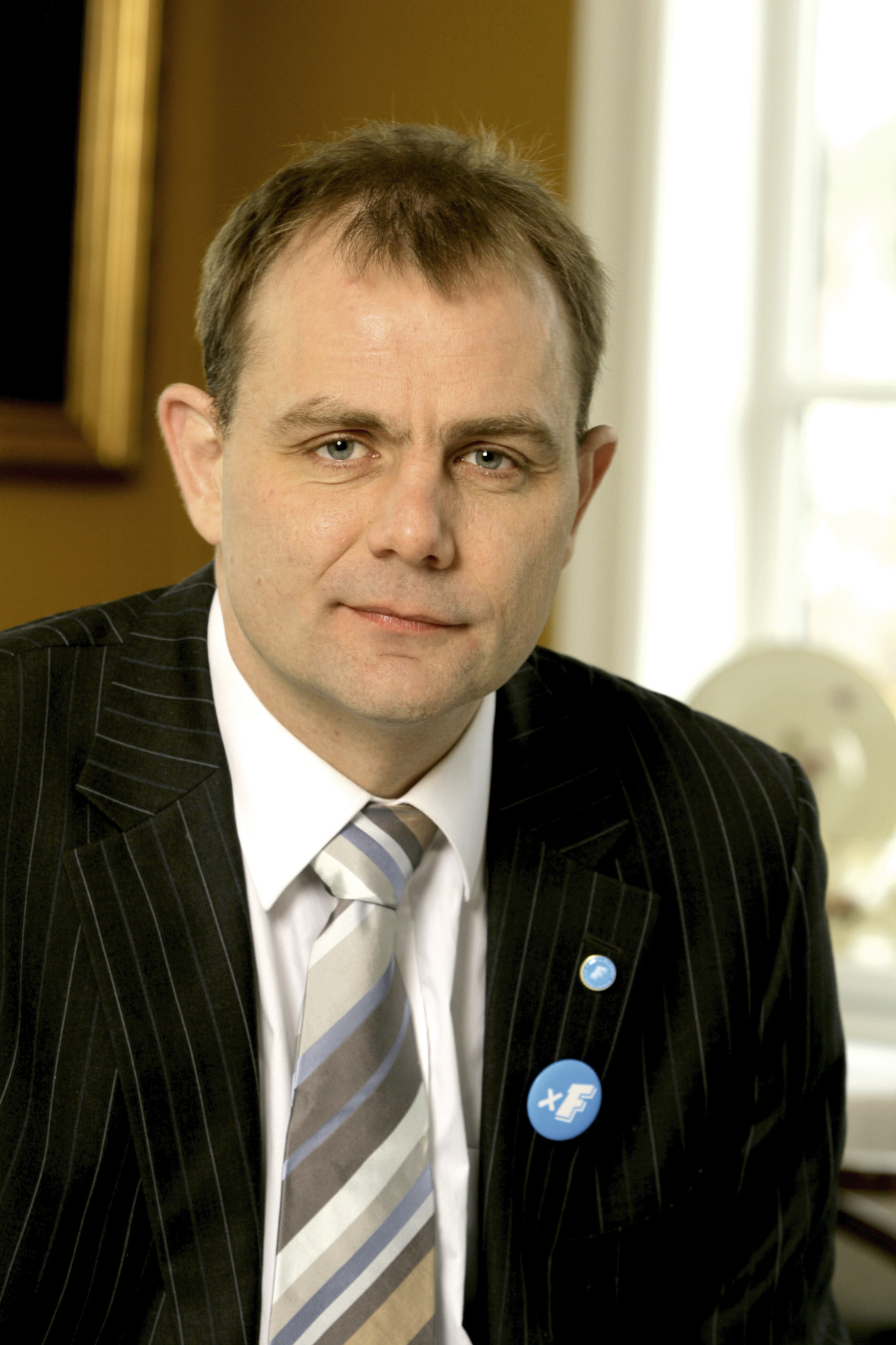
Sigurjón in 2007

Sigurjón Þórðarson (born 29 June 1964) is an Icelandic politician. He was a member of the Althing for the Liberal Party from 2003 to 2007, and returned to the Althing in the 2024 election for the People's Party.

In 2010, he was elected leader of the Liberal Party. In the municipal elections in May 2010, Sigurjón was elected to the municipal council of Skagafjörður.

Sigurjón has a BS degree in biology from the University of Iceland and studied water pollution control technology at Cranfield University. Sigurjón is a goði—similar to a pagan priest—within Ásatrúarfélagið.
