= Magnús Orri Schram =

Icelandic politician (born 1972)

Magnús Orri Schram (born 23 April 1972 in Reykjavík) is an Icelandic politician.

== See also ==
- Politics of Iceland
