= Sigmundur Ernir Rúnarsson =

Icelandic politician (born 1961)

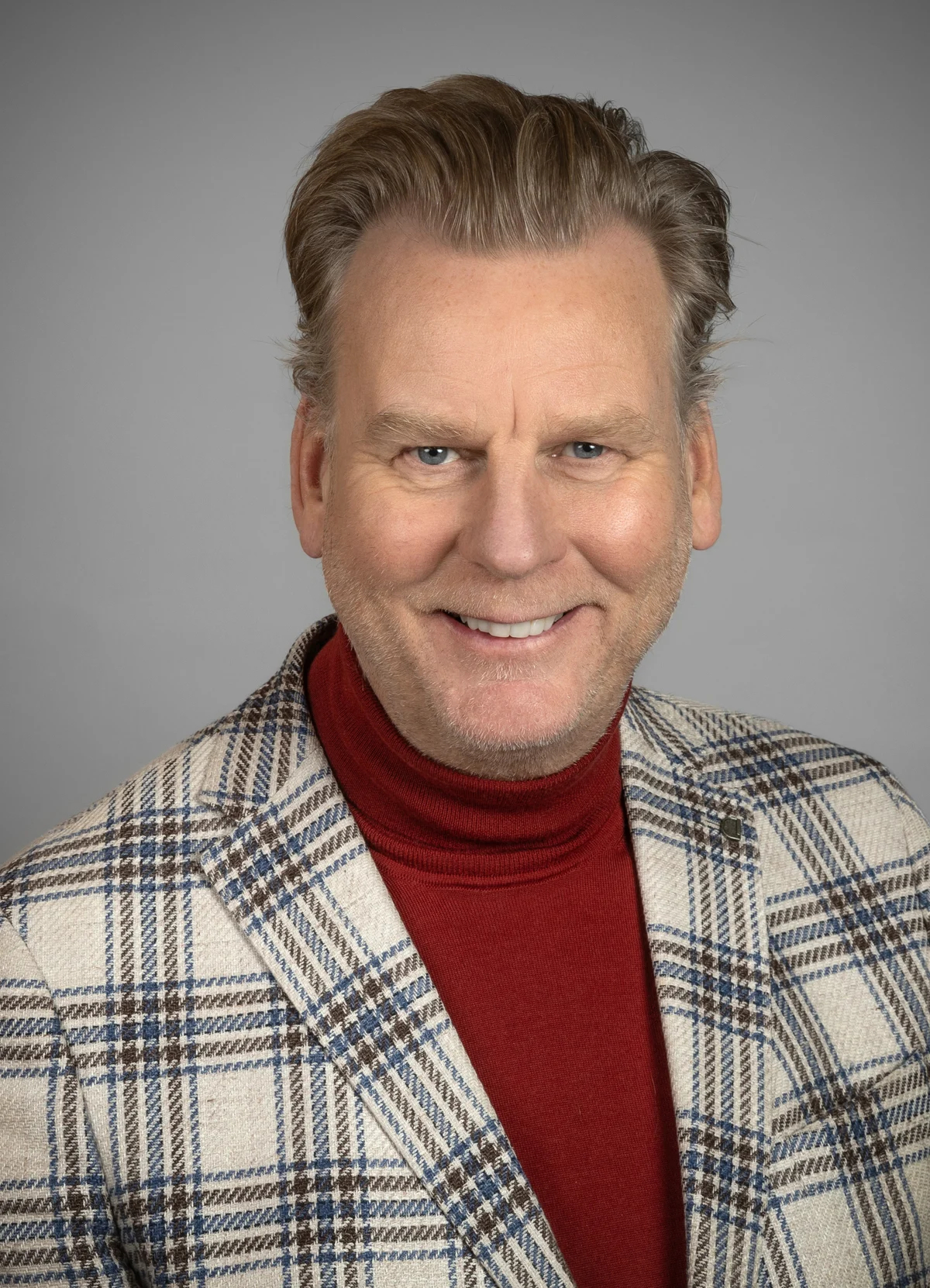
- Sigmundur Ernir Rúnarsson in 2025, courtesy of the Alþingi

Member of the Althing
- Incumbent
- Assumed office 2025
- Constituency: Reykjavík North
- In office 2009–2013
- Constituency: Northeast

Personal details
- Born: 6 March 1961 (age 65) Akureyri, Iceland
- Party: Social Democratic Alliance

Sigmundur Ernir Rúnarsson (born 6 March 1961) is a member of parliament of the Althing, the Icelandic parliament. He is a member of the Social Democratic Alliance. He has been a member of the Icelandic Delegation to the Inter-Parliamentary Union since 2010.
