= Jónína Rós Guðmundsdóttir =

Icelandic politician (born 1958)

Jonina Ros Guomundsdottir (born 6 July 1958) is a politician and member of the Althing, the Icelandic parliament. She is a member of the Social Democratic Alliance. She has been a member of the Icelandic Delegation to the EFTA since 2009.
