= Ásbjörn Óttarsson =

Icelandic politician (born 1962)

Ásbjörn Óttarsson (born 16 November 1962 in Reykjavík) is an Icelandic politician.
