= Björn Valur Gíslason =

Icelandic politician

Björn Valur Gíslason (born 20 September 1959) is a former member of parliament of the Althing, the Icelandic parliament (2009–2013). He is a member of the Left-Green Movement. He has been a member of the Icelandic Delegation to the OSCE Parliamentary Assembly since 2009.
