= Ragnheiður Ríkharðsdóttir =

Icelandic politician (born 1949)

Vice President of Althing
- In office 2009–2013
- President: Ólafur Ragnar Grímsson
- Prime Minister: Jóhanna Sigurðadóttir
- Preceded by: Kjartan Ólafsson
- Succeeded by: Kristján L. Möller

Personal details
- Born: 23 June 1949 (age 77) Akranes, Iceland
- Citizenship: Iceland
- Party: Independence Party
- Spouse: Daði Runólfsson
- Children: 2
- Education: University of Iceland

Ragnheiður Ríkharðsdóttir (born 23 June 1949) is an Icelandic politician. She was a member of Alþingi for the Independence Party from 2007 to 2016 and the mayor of Mosfellsbær from 2002 to 2007.

== Personal life ==
Ragnheiður's father was Ríkharður Jónsson, a former footballer and manager who played 33 games for the Icelandic national team. Her son is former footballer Ríkharður Daðason.
