= Birkir Jón Jónsson =

Icelandic politician

Member of the Althing
- In office 2003–2013
- Constituency: Northeast

Member of the European Assembly for Iceland
- In office 2009–2013

Personal details
- Born: 24 July 1979 (age 46) Siglufjörður, Iceland
- Party: Progressive
- Other political affiliations: Alliance of Liberals and Democrats for Europe

Birkir Jón Jónsson (born 24 July 1979) is a member of parliament of the Althing, the Icelandic parliament. He is a member of the Progressive Party. He has been a member of the Icelandic Delegation to the Council of Europe Parliamentary Assembly since 2009.
