= Lilja Rafney Magnúsdóttir =

Icelandic politician (born 1957)

Lilja Rafney Magnúsdóttir (born 24 June 1957) is an Icelandic politician.

== See also ==
- Politics of Iceland
