= Þuríður Backman =

Icelandic politician

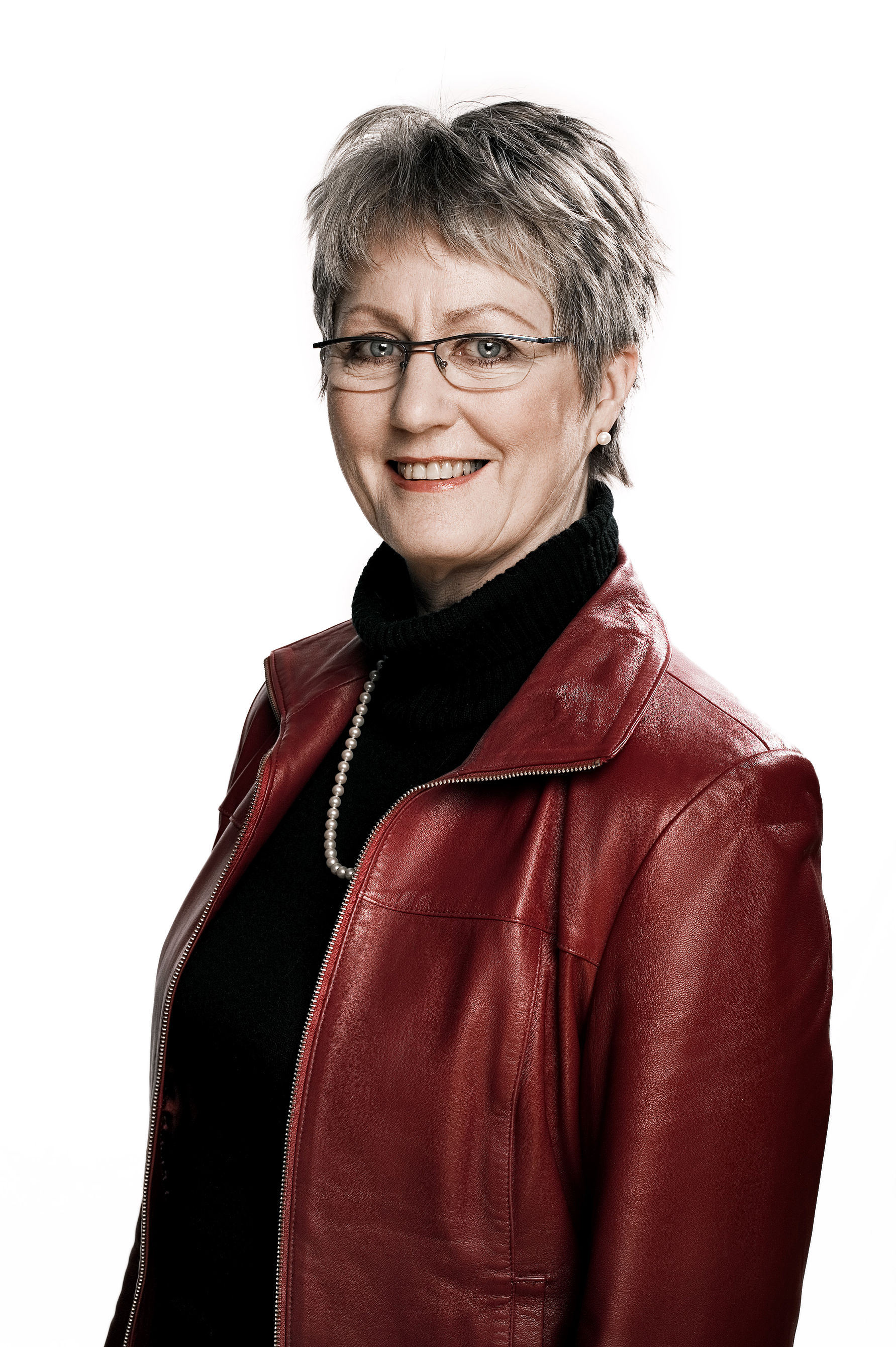

Þuríður Backman (born 8 January 1948) served as a member of parliament of the Althing, the Icelandic parliament from 1999 to 2013, first for the Austurland constituency and since 2003, after a new division of constituencies was established, for the Northeast constituency. She is a member of the Left-Green Movement. She has been Deputy Speaker of the Althing since 2003, and a member of the Icelandic Delegation to the Inter-Parliamentary Union since 2007.
