= Víðir Reynisson =

Icelandic police officer

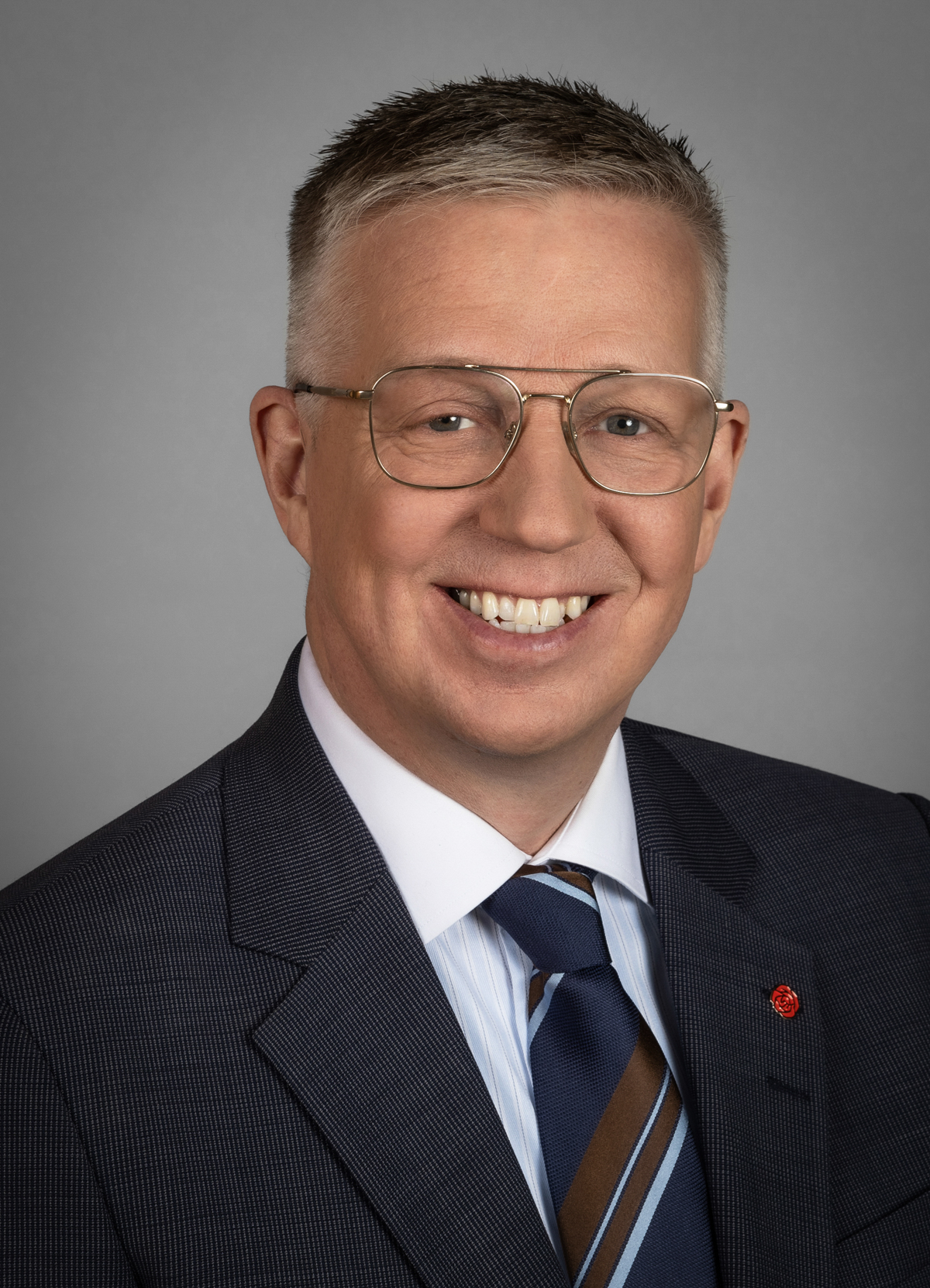
- Born: Guðmundur Víðir Reynisson; 22 April 1967 (age 59); Vestmannaeyjar, Iceland
- Known for: COVID-19 pandemic in Iceland
- Police career
- Department: Office of the National Commissioner of the Police
- Rank: Chief superintendent - 2020

Víðir Reynisson (born 22 April 1967) is an Icelandic police officer and the chief superintendent of the Office of the National Commissioner of the Police. He is also the chief of security for the Football Association of Iceland.

== Early life ==
Víðir was born in Vestmannaeyjar and lived there to the age of 11.

== Career ==
=== COVID-19 pandemic in Iceland ===
Since February 2020, Víðir has been one of the lead members of the Iceland's Department of Civil Protection and Emergency Management addressing the COVID-19 pandemic in Iceland along with Alma Möller and Þórólfur Guðnason.

On 25 November 2020 he was diagnosed with COVID-19 and on 4 December he was admitted into the National University Hospital of Iceland after his condition worsened. By 21 December, he had returned to duty.

== See also ==
- COVID-19 vaccination in Iceland
