= Byrgið =

Icelandic Christian residential treatment center

Byrgið was an Icelandic Christian residential treatment center for homeless drug and gambling addicts, and people with various other personality disorders. The aim of the treatment was to help individuals achieve a better life. Byrgið also provided preventive work and advice to the relatives of addicts. Guðmundur Jónsson was the director of Byrgið until December 2006, when he stepped down temporarily. Jón Arnarr Einarsson took over as director until Byrgið was closed on 15 January 2007, and shortly thereafter, the operation was permanently shut down. Former residents were offered temporary treatment at Landspítali, but it is not known how many took advantage of that offer.
