= Þórólfur Guðnason =

Icelandic doctor

- Born: 28 October 1953 (age 72); Iceland
- Education: University of Iceland 1981; University of Connecticut 1988; University of Minnesota 1990
- Medical career
- Field: Infectious Disease Control

Þórólfur Guðnason (born 28 October 1953) is an Icelandic doctor who served as the Chief Epidemiologist of the Icelandic Directorate of Health from 2015 to 2022. He was one of the lead members of the Iceland's Department of Civil Protection and Emergency Management addressing the COVID-19 pandemic in Iceland, along with Alma Möller and Víðir Reynisson.

== Early life and education ==
Þórólfur grew up in Eskifjörður and later in Vestmannaeyjar where he lived until the age of 19.

He specialized in pediatrics and pediatric infectious disease. In 2013 he defended his doctoral thesis on the epidemiology of pneumococcal infections in young Icelandic children.

== Career ==
=== Chief Epidemiologist of Iceland ===
The vaccination of Icelandic children aged 12 to 15 began on 22 August 2021, with only the Pfizer/BioNTech used; Chief Epidemiologist Þórólfur Guðnason stating to the public that vaccinating children was "the right thing to do". By 9 November 2021, 300,000 people had received a booster shot in Iceland, or 76% of the total population, and of those people, 10 had contracted COVID. Guðnason stated that of the around 270,000 people who were fully vaccinated, 4,500 or 1.6% had contracted COVID. At the time, eligible age groups did not include those under 12 years old.

== See also ==
- COVID-19 vaccination in Iceland
