= Kristján L. Möller =

Icelandic politician (born 1953)

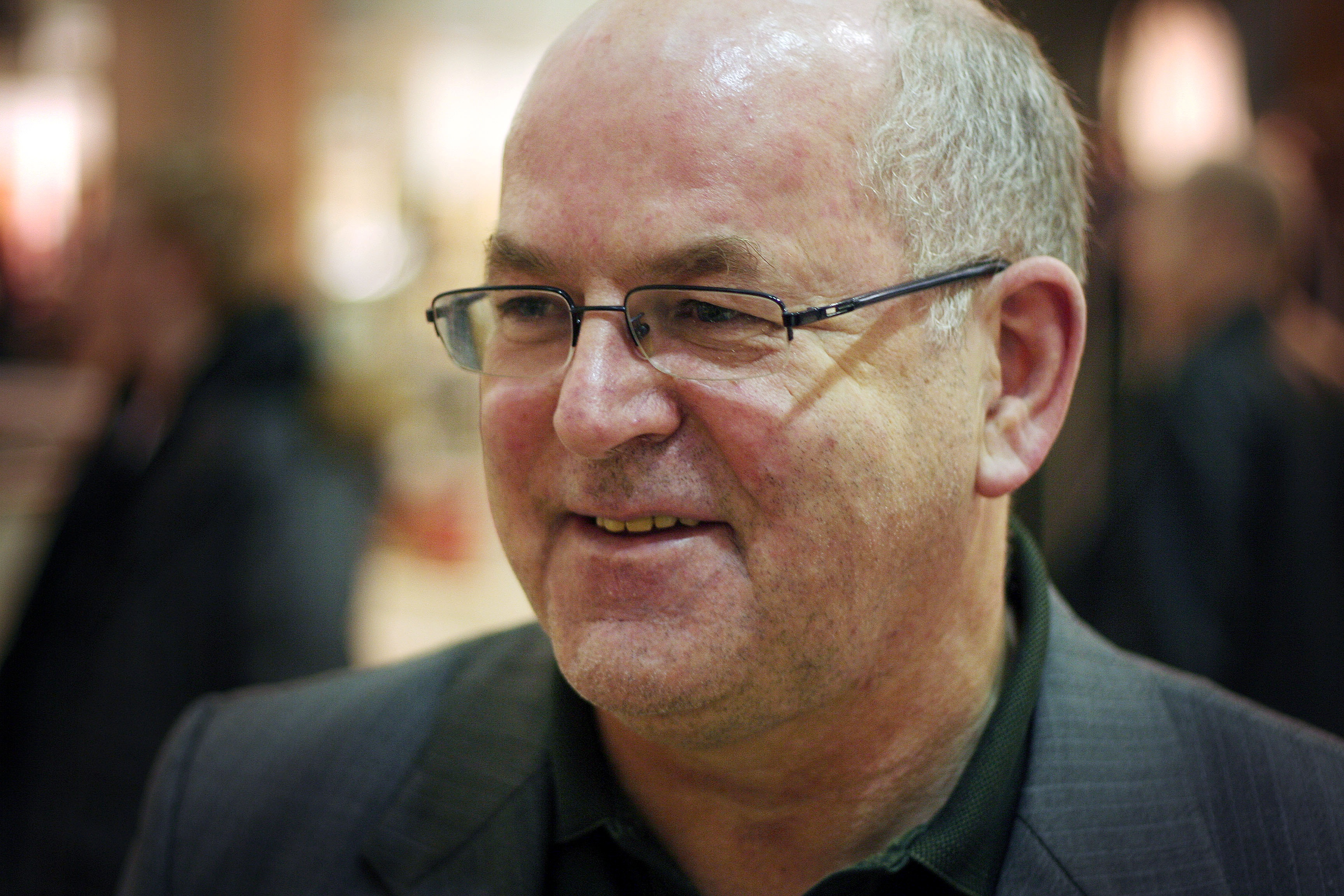

Minister of Communications
- In office 24 May 2007 – 2 September 2010
- Prime Minister: Geir Haarde, Jóhanna Sigurðardóttir
- Preceded by: Sturla Böðvarsson (as Minister of Communications and Transportation)
- Succeeded by: Ögmundur Jónasson (as Minister of Transport, Communications and Local Government)

Personal details
- Born: 26 June 1953 (age 72) Siglufjörður, Iceland
- Party: Social Democratic Alliance
- Spouse: Oddný Hervör Jóhannsdóttir
- Children: Three sons (b. 1979, 1983, 1988)
- Relatives: Alma Möller (sister)

Kristján Lúðvík Möller (born 26 June 1953) is an Icelandic politician. He has been Iceland's Minister of Communications from 2007 to 2010, and a member of the Althing (Iceland's parliament) from 1999 to 2016, for the Northwest Iceland constituency (1999–2003) and the Northeast Iceland constituency (2003–2016). He is the older brother of Alma Möller.

Political offices
| Preceded by Sturla Böðvarsson as Minister of Communications and Transportation | Minister of Communications; 2007–2010 | Succeeded by Ögmundur Jónasson as Minister of Transport, Communications and Local Government |
