= Birgir Jakobsson =

Icelandic basketball player (born 1948)

- Born: 21 March 1948 (age 78); Reykjavík, Iceland
- Education: University of Iceland

Director of Health
- In office 2015–2018
- Preceded by: Geir Gunnlaugsson
- Succeeded by: Alma Möller
- Basketball career

Career information
- Playing career: 1964–1978
- Position: Forward

Career history
- 1964–1976: Íþróttafélag Reykjavíkur
- 1976–1978: Hörður Patreksfirði

Career highlights
- Úrvalsdeild Player of the Year (1972); 7x Icelandic champion (1964, 1969–1973, 1975)

Birgir Jakobsson (born 21 March 1948) is an Icelandic doctor and former basketball player. Following a 20-year stay as a doctor and later director at the Karolinska University Hospital, he was the Director of Health of Iceland from 2015 to 2018.

Birgir played basketball for several years, playing the majority of his basketball career with Íþróttafélag Reykjavíkur where he won seven national championships and was named the Úrvalsdeild Player of the Year in 1972. Outside of club basketball, he was a member of the Icelandic national basketball team from 1966 to 1976.

== Early life ==
Birgir was born in Reykjavík to Jakob Tryggvason and Ragnheiður Jónsdóttir.

== Basketball ==
=== Club career ===
Born in Reykjavík, Birgir started playing basketball at the age of 10. He played his first senior games with ÍR in 1964. In December, he was part of the first Icelandic team to participate in a continental competition when he scored a game high 16 points in a 71–17 victory against the Collegians in the FIBA European Champions Cup (now EuroLeague). In the second game between the teams later in the month, he scored 26 points in ÍR's 63–47 victory. In 1972, he was named the league's best player.

In 1972 he played for ÍR against Real Madrid in the FIBA European Champions Cup.

=== National team career ===
From 1966 to 1976, Birgir played 24 games for the Icelandic national team.

=== Awards, titles and accomplishments ===
==== Individual awards ====
- Úrvalsdeild Player of the Year: 1972

==== Titles ====
- Úrvalsdeild karla (7): 1964, 1969, 1970, 1971, 1972, 1973, 1975
