= Bjarni Pálsson =

Icelandic doctor

- Born: 17 May 1719; Eyjafjörður, Iceland, Denmark–Norway
- Died: 8 September 1779 (aged 60)
- Education: University of Copenhagen
- Spouse: Rannveig Skúladóttir

Director of Health
- In office 18 March 1760 – 1779
- Succeeded by: Jón Sveinsson

Bjarni Pálsson (17 May 1719 – 8 September 1779) was an Icelandic medical doctor and naturalist. On 18 March 1760 he was named the first Director of Health in Iceland.

== Life ==
Bjarni was born in Upsum at Eyjafjörður to Páll Bjarnason and Sigríður Ásmundsdóttir.

From 1752 to 1757 he traveled around the country with his friend Eggert Ólafsson on a grant from the Danish state. A book that they subsequently wrote about the trip was published in 1772 under the title Journey through Iceland. It is a comprehensive representation of the country and its population at that time. The book was translated into German, French and English in the 19th century, but was not published until 1943 in Icelandic under the title Ferðabók Eggerts og Bjarna.

Bjarni was appointed Iceland's first Director of Health on March 18 1760 by a royal decree. As such, he first lived in Bessastaðir and later in Nes on Seltjarnarnes, where he died in 1779 at the age of 60.
