= Kleppur =

Coordinates: 64.1450°N 21.8486°W

Kleppsspítali
- The National University Hospital of Iceland
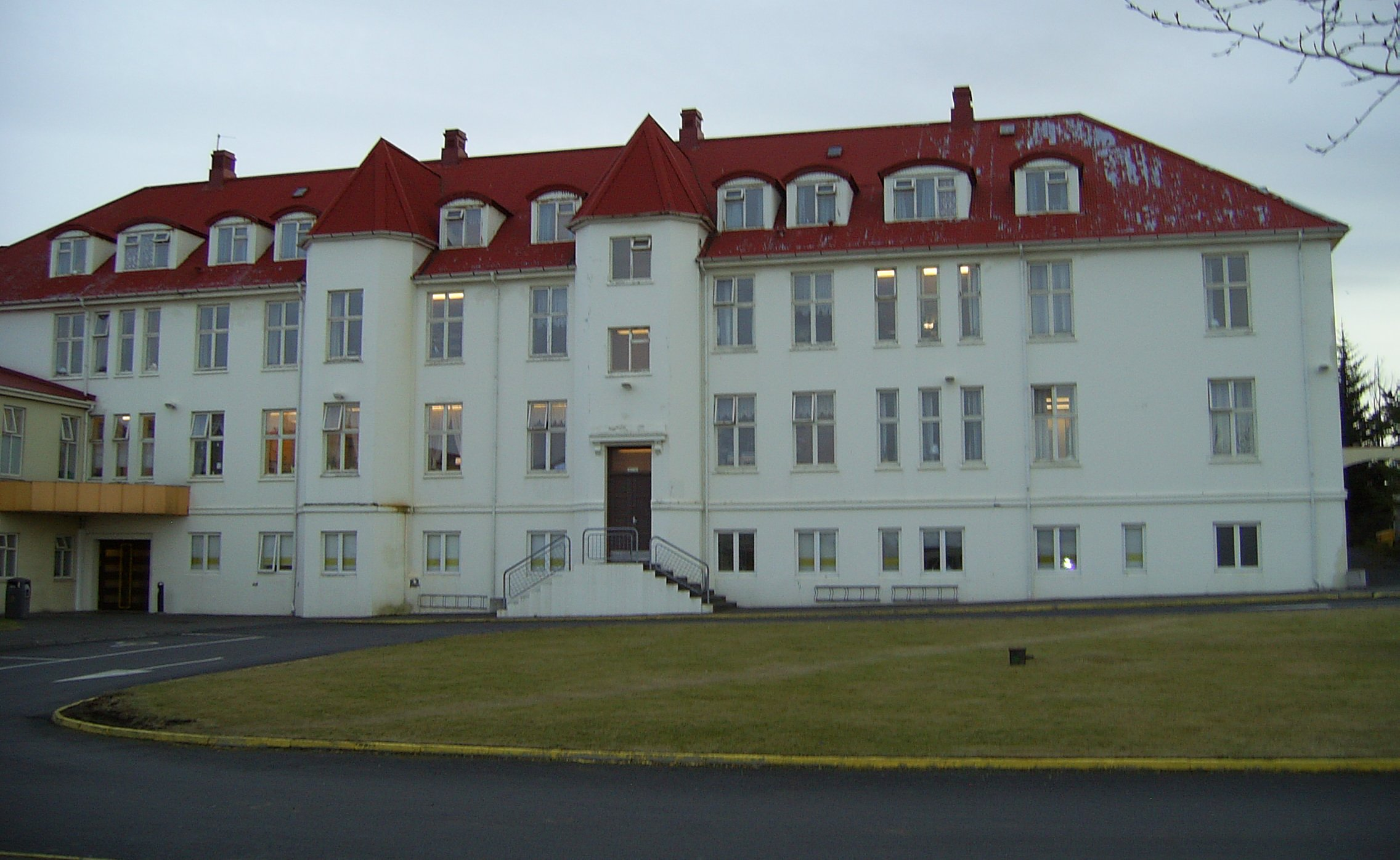
- Kleppsspítali, main building.

Geography
- Location: Reykjavík, Iceland

Organisation
- Type: Specialist
- Affiliated university: University of Iceland

Services
- Speciality: Mental disorder

History
- Founded: 1907

Kleppur or Kleppsspítali is an Icelandic psychiatric hospital that is operated by The National University Hospital of Iceland.

The first laws concerning Kleppur were nr. 33/1905, accepted by Christian IX on 20 October. The institution was opened in 1907, originally housing 50 patients. Kleppur was the first medical institution that was constructed and ran completely on public funds. The institution's administration consisted of the Icelandic Director of Health and individuals appointed by the Icelandic government.

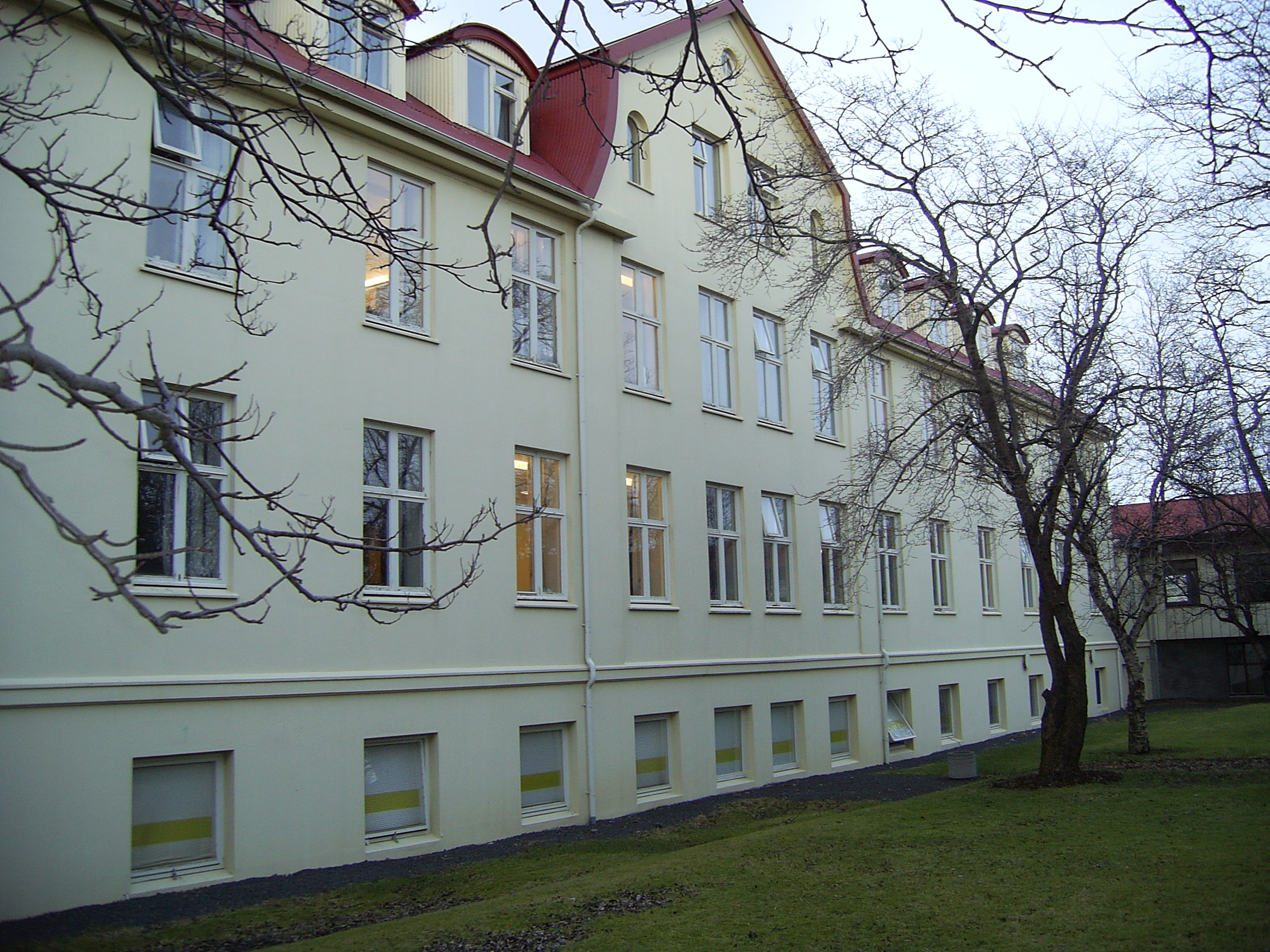
Kleppur, the main building's backside.

At the time of the hospital's founding, mental illness was a big issue. Mentally ill individuals were commonly mistreated and their quality of living was worse than that of healthy people. The year 1901, a census was done to count the number of mentally ill individuals in the country. The census found 133 mentally ill individuals, 124 of which lived in rural areas.

The hospital changed a lot, although it could not take in everyone that needed it, as the Director of Health at that time told Alþingi.

The hospital's methods of operation have changed drastically of the years with the introduction of new and improved therapeutics. Today, Kleppur's operations mainly consist of rehabilitation and various treatments for people with mental health problems, such as schizophrenia, bipolar disorder, anxiety, depression and addiction. Kleppur now has a polyclinic, one psychiatric rehabilitation ward, a security ward, and a forensic unit. A rehabilitation center adjacent to the hospital is in use for patents and outpatients.

== Gallery ==
The pictures are of the hospital's building, taken in March 2006.

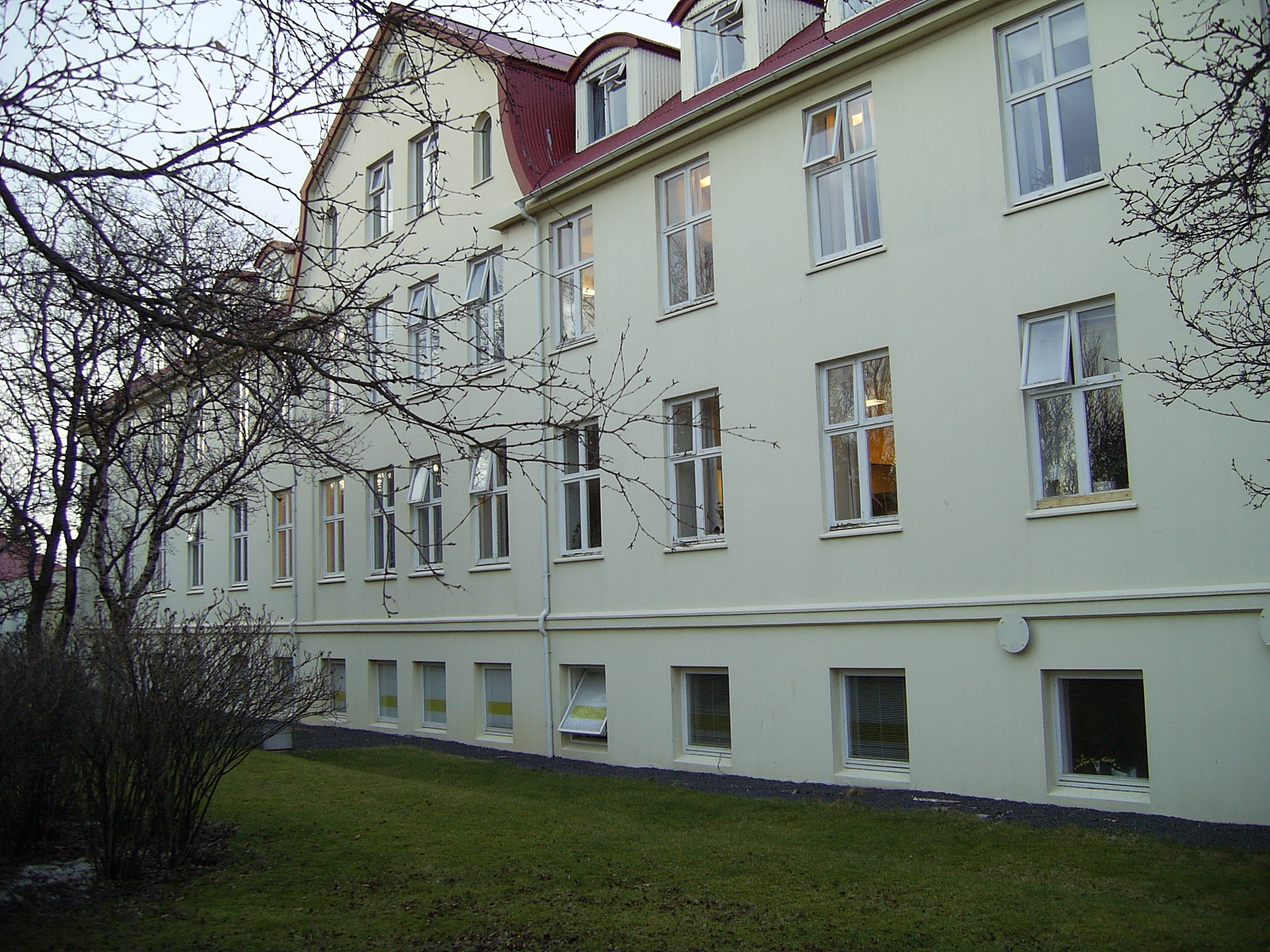
Kleppur, main building, taken from the garden.

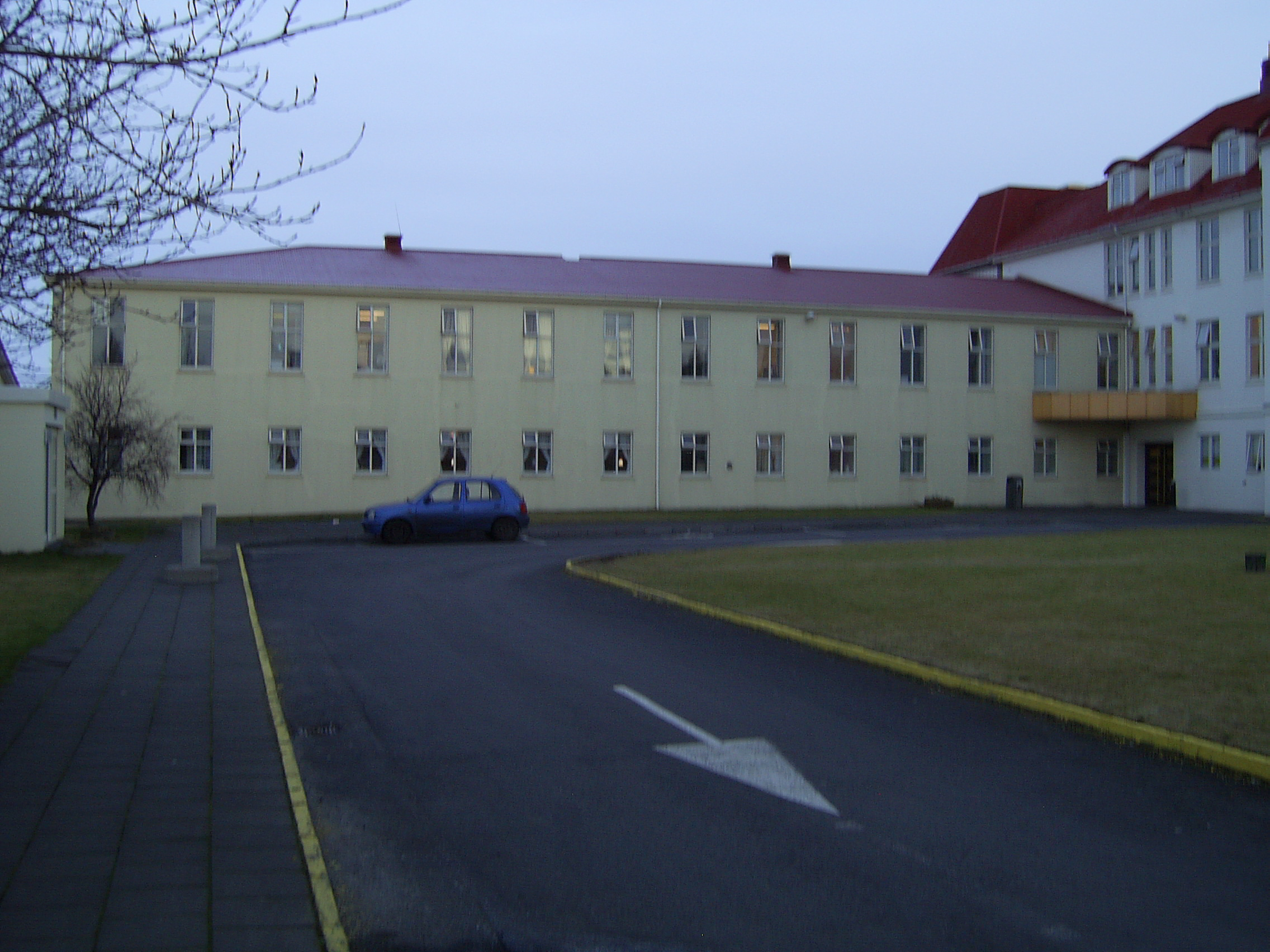
Kleppur, northern annex.

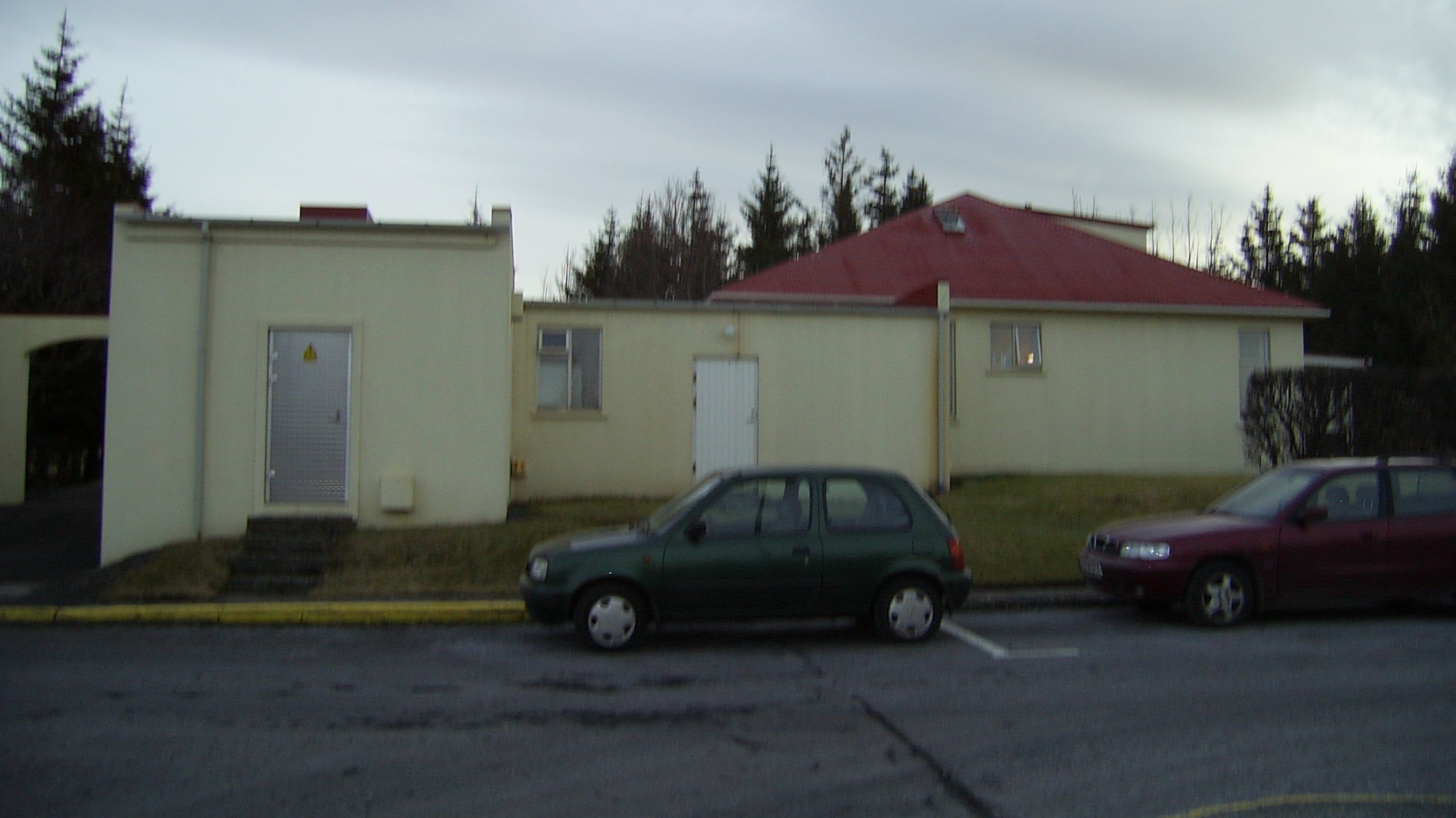
Kleppur, the old doctor's living quarters.

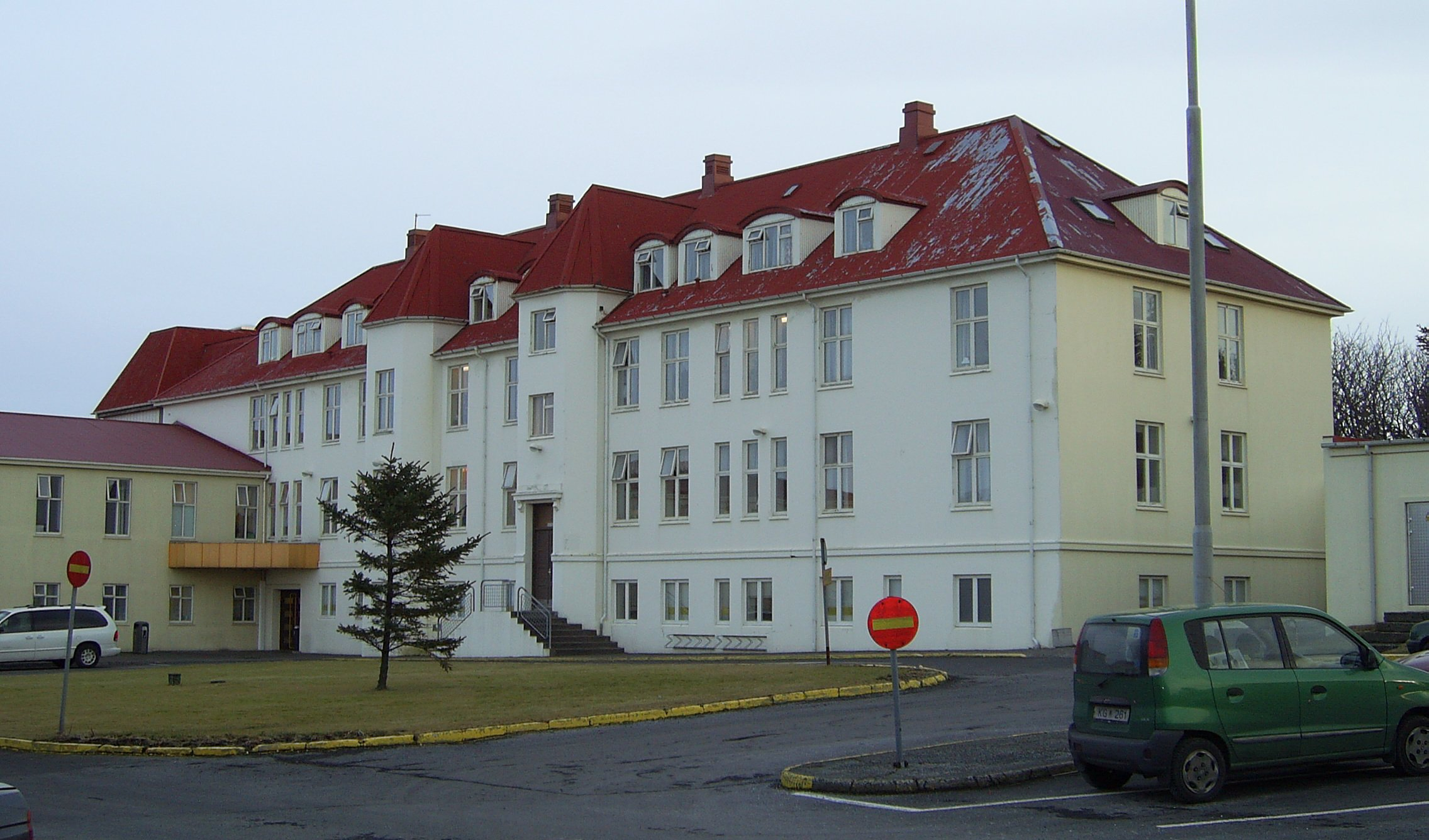
Kleppur, main building.

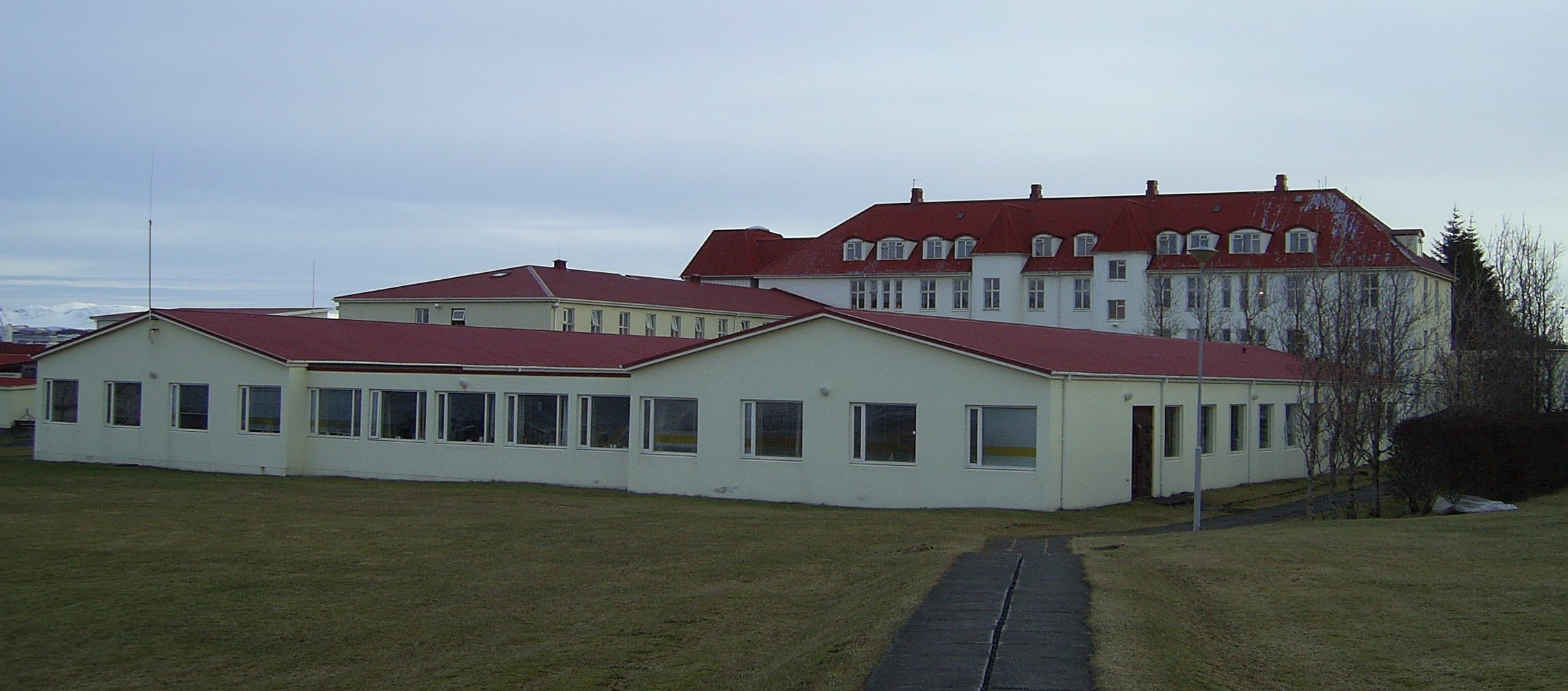
Kleppur, offices, and reception in the foreground, main building in the background.

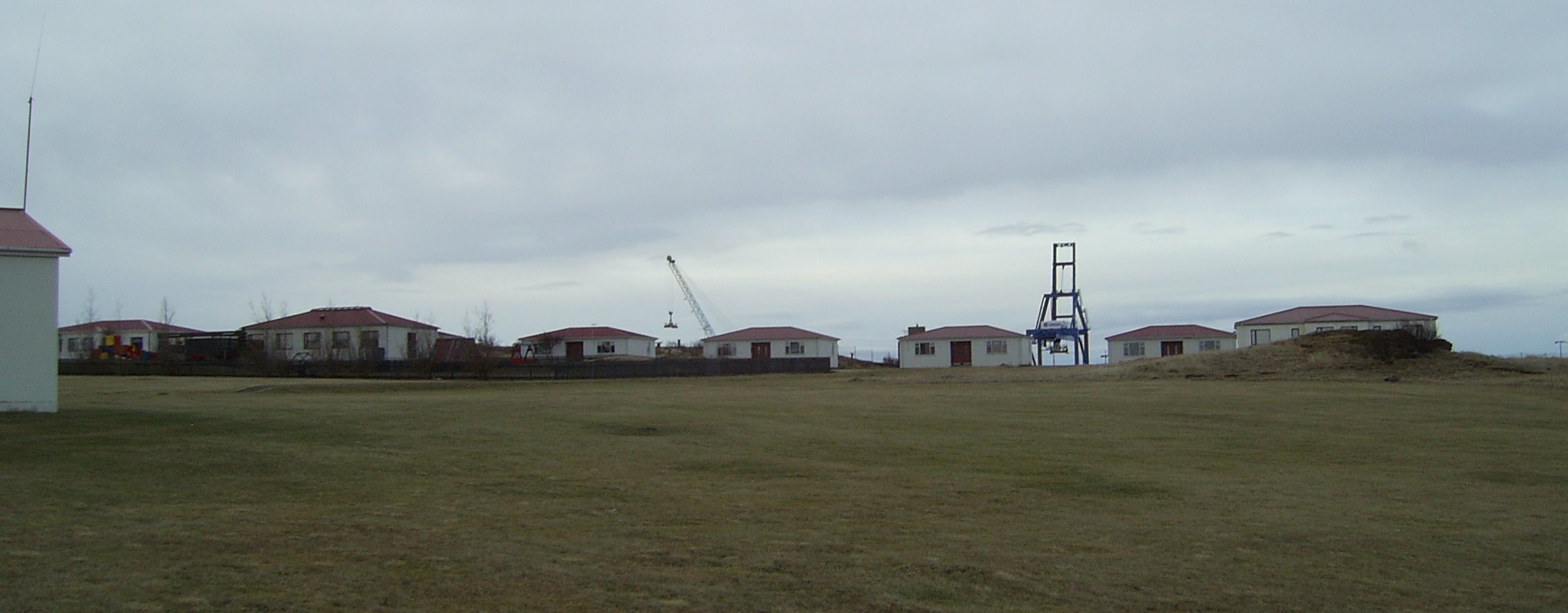
Kleppur, residential house that is on the land.

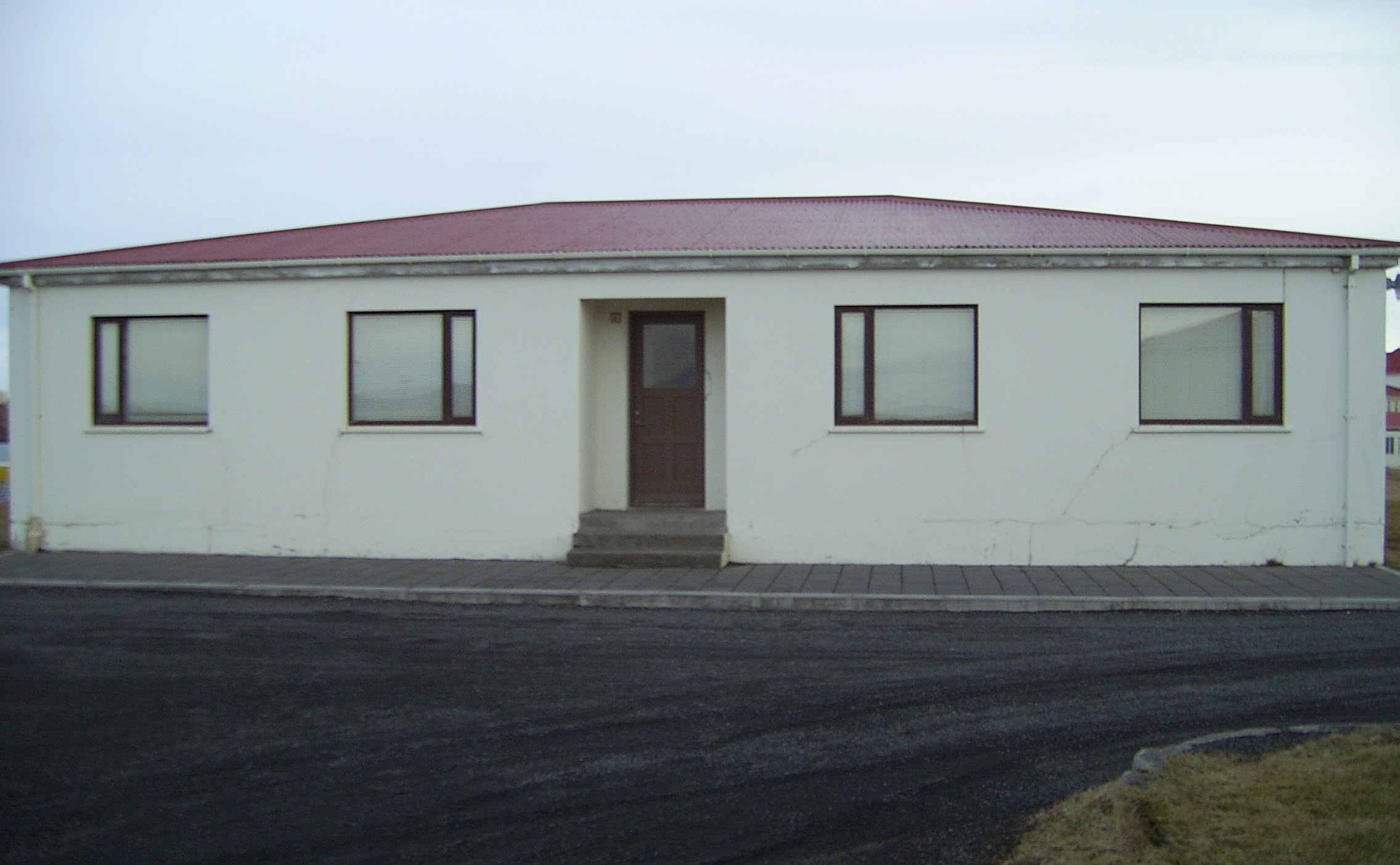
Kleppur, one of the residential houses on the land.

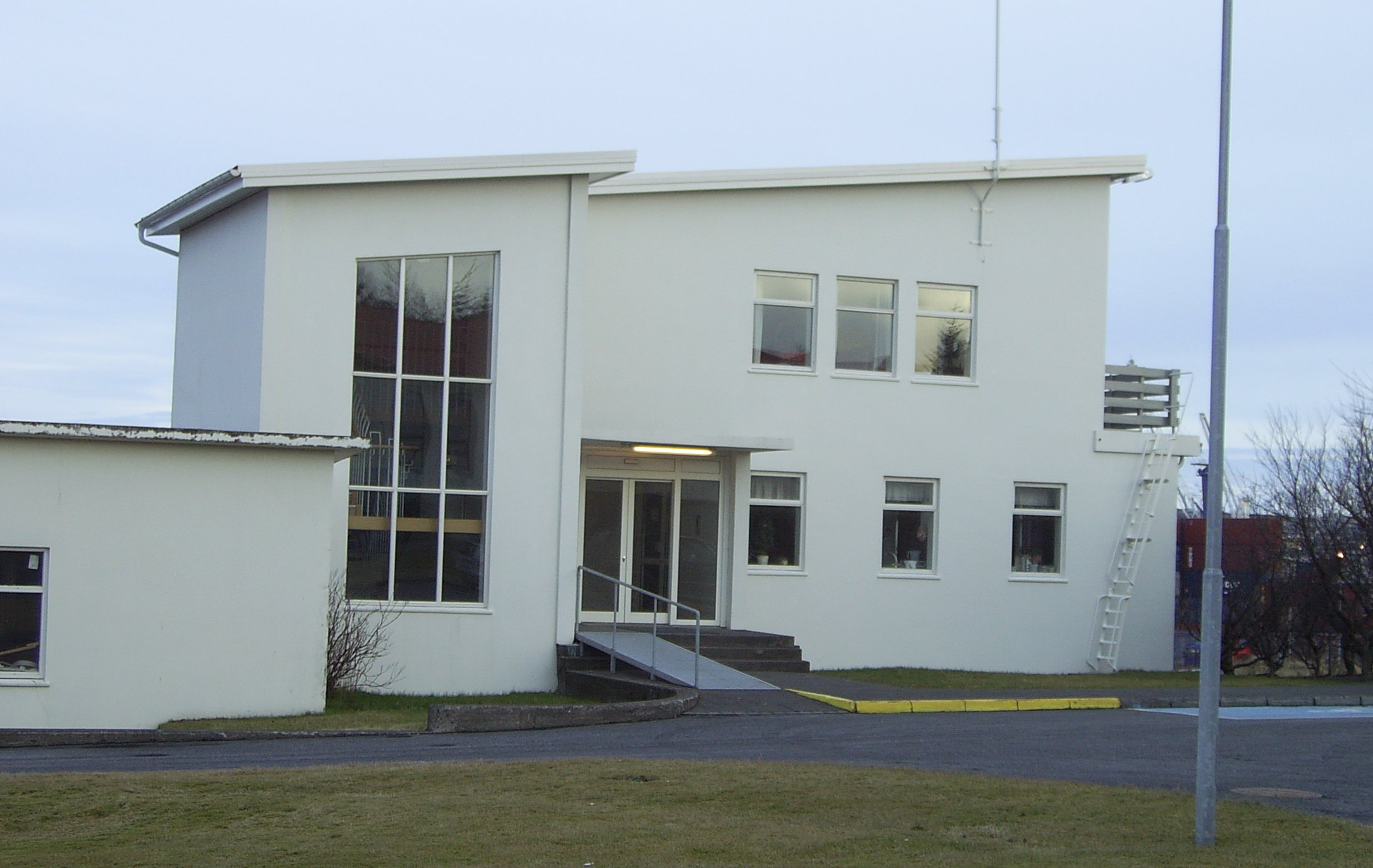
Kleppur, auditorium.

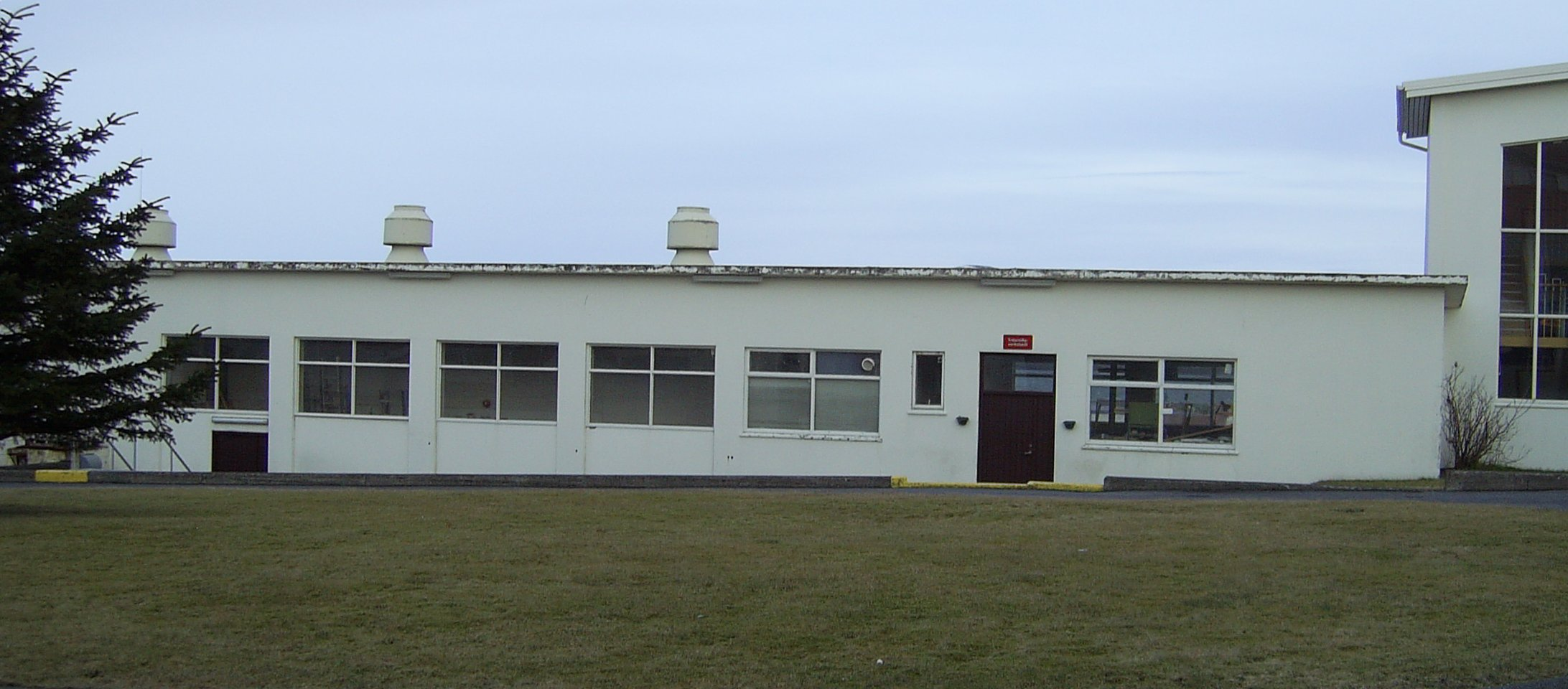
Kleppur, painting workshop.

== Sources ==
- Grein um störf löggjafans á Heimastjorn.is, archived from the original on 12 March 2017
- Um deild 11 - Kleppi á www.landspitali.is, archived from the original on 6 October 2007
- Um deild 12 - Kleppi á www.landspitali.is, archived from the original on 6 October 2007
- Um deild 13 - Kleppi á www.landspitali.is
- Um deild 14 - Kleppi á www.landspitali.is, archived from the original on 6 October 2007
- Um deild 15 - Kleppi á www.landspitali.is, archived from the original on 6 October 2007
- Um göngudeild Kleppi á www.landspitali.is, archived from the original on 6 October 2007
- Stjórnartíðindi A, 1905-1907, bls. 212.
- Alþingistíðindi B, 1905, bls. 1125-1144.
- Alþingistíðindi B, 1907, bls. 2683.
