= Alma Möller =

Icelandic doctor (born 1961)

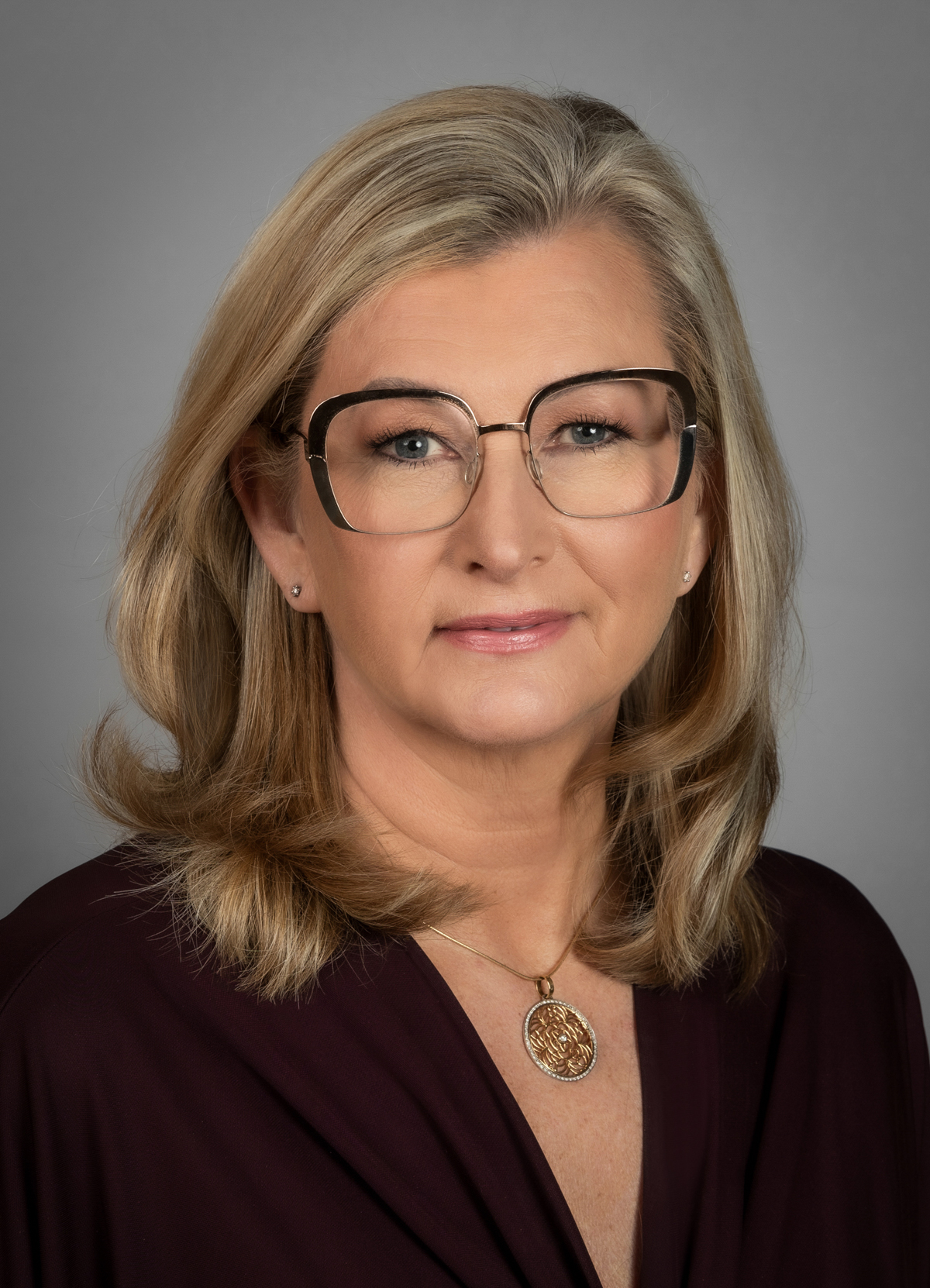
- Official portrait, 2025

Minister of Health
- Incumbent
- Assumed office 21 December 2024
- Prime Minister: Kristrún Frostadóttir
- Preceded by: Willum Þór Þórsson

Member of the Althing
- Incumbent
- Assumed office 30 November 2024
- Constituency: Southwest

Director of Health
- In office 1 April 2018 – 10 December 2024
- Preceded by: Birgir Jakobsson
- Succeeded by: María Heimisdóttir

Personal details
- Born: Alma Dagbjört Möller; 24 June 1961 (age 65) Siglufjörður, Iceland
- Party: Social Democratic Alliance
- Spouse: Torfi Fjalar Jónasson
- Children: 2
- Relatives: Kristján L. Möller (brother)
- Education: University of Iceland
- Occupation: Physician, politician
- Awards: Order of the Falcon (2020)

Alma Dagbjört Möller (born 24 June 1961) is an Icelandic physician and politician. On 1 April 2018, she became the first woman to serve as the Director of Health since the office was established in 1760. Since February 2020, she has been one of the lead members of the Iceland's Department of Civil Protection and Emergency Management addressing the COVID-19 pandemic in Iceland.

On 17 June 2020, Möller was awarded a knighthood of the Order of the Falcon for services to health affairs and contributions during the COVID-19 pandemic.

Möller was elected to the Althing for the Social Democratic Alliance in the 2024 election. She became Minister of Health in the government of Prime Minister Kristrún Frostadóttir.

== Early life ==
Möller was born in 24 June 1961, in Siglufjörður, the daughter of Helena Sigtryggsdóttir and Jóhann Georg Möller. She was the youngest of 6 siblings that included Kristján L. Möller, a former parliamentarian and Minister of Communications.

In May 1990, Möller became the first woman to serve as a helicopter doctor for the Icelandic Coast Guard.

== See also ==
- COVID-19 vaccination in Iceland
