= Directorate of Health =

National public health institute in Iceland

Agency overview
- Formed: 18 March 1760; 266 years ago
- Headquarters: Katrínartúni 2, Reykjavík, Iceland
- Agency executives: Alma Möller, Director of Health; Þórólfur Guðnason, Chief Epidemiologist
- Parent agency: Ministry of Welfare
- Website: www.landlaeknir.is

The Directorate of Health (Icelandic: Embætti landlæknis) is an Icelandic government agency whose principal role is to promote high-quality and safe health care for the people of Iceland, health promotion, and effective disease prevention measures.

== History ==
The Directorate was founded on 18 March 1760 when Bjarni Pálsson was made the first Director of Health (Icelandic: Landlæknir) by a royal decree. In 2018, Alma Möller became the first woman to serve as Director.

=== Directors of Health ===
- Bjarni Pálsson 1760–1779
- Jón Sveinsson 1780–1803
- Sveinn Pálsson 1803–1804 (acting)
- Tómas Klog 1804–1815
- Oddur Hjaltalín 1816–1820 (acting)
- Jón Thorstenssen 1820–1855
- Jón Hjaltalín 1855–1881
- Jónas Jónassen 1881–1882 (acting)
- Hans J. G. Schierbeck 1882–1895
- Jónas Jónassen 1895–1906
- Guðmundur Björnsson 1906–1931
- Vilmundur Jónsson 1931–1959
- Sigurður Sigurðsson 1960–1972
- Ólafur Ólafsson 1972–1998
- Sigurður Guðmundsson 1998–2006
- Matthías Halldórsson 2006–2007 (acting)
- Sigurður Guðmundsson 2007–2008
- Matthías Halldórsson 2008–2009
- Geir Gunnlaugsson 2010–2014
- Birgir Jakobsson 2015–2018
- Alma Möller 2018–2024
- Gudrún Aspelund 2024–2025 (temporary)
- María Heimisdóttir 2025–present
