= COVID-19 vaccination in Iceland =

Plan to immunize against COVID-19

- Date: 27 December 2020 – present
- Location: Iceland
- Cause: COVID-19 pandemic
- Target: Full immunization of people in Iceland against COVID-19
- Participants: See below
- Outcome: 89.1% of the total population have received at least one dose 83.2% of the total population have been fully vaccinated 65.6% of the total population have had a booster shot

COVID-19 vaccination in Iceland is an effort to immunize the adult population of Iceland due to the COVID-19 pandemic. As of July 2021, more than 260,000 individuals had received at least one dose of COVID-19 vaccine, which was over 78% of the country's population. On November 21, 2021, 90% of the target population had been fully vaccinated, while around 1 in 5 people had received a booster on top of that; by December 9, 2021, the share of the population having received a booster shot exceeded 50%. On December 13, 2021, the country began offering Pfizer vaccinations to children aged 5–11.

The vaccines approved for use in Iceland are Pfizer, Moderna, AstraZeneca, and Janssen. Iceland has also signed a contract with CureVac.

== History ==
=== Vaccine contracts ===
Iceland signed a contract on December 9, 2020, with Pfizer, and a contract with Moderna on December 30, 2020. Astra Zeneca signed a contract with Iceland on October 15, Janssen on December 22, and CureVac on February 21, 2021.

=== First administrations ===
Iceland's first doses of vaccine were received on December 28, 2020; vaccination began on December 29. Vaccines were optional and free, with priority groups abolished in June 2021 once all residents over 16 had been offered vaccination. All foreign residents were given access, regardless of residency status or whether they had a kennitala, or ID number. Iceland began administering vaccines on December 29, 2020, of the Moderna, Pfizer, and AstraZeneca varieties. On March 30, 2021, it was reported that around 100% of Icelandic elderly residents over 80 were fully vaccinated. Doses by Janssen were pending shipments to the country. In March 2021, Icelandic healthcare authorities resumed the use of AstraZeneca, administering it to people over age 70. On April 20, 2021, the Iceland Symphony Orchestra performed for individuals getting the vaccine at the mass vaccination centre, at which point people "of all ages with underlying chronic illnesses" were being vaccinated.

On May 3, 2021, it was reported that Icelandic authorities would be offering vaccines to the general populace not by descending age groups, but by random selection, at which point 29.89% of Iceland's population had one or both shots. On April 29, 2021, the Prime Minister and other government ministers had attended a deCODE study on achieving herd immunity, which the chief epidemiologist then cited as the rationale for seeking to change the rollout methodology.

=== Lifting of restrictions ===
On June 30, 2021, it was reported that the government had declared their vaccination programme "completed," as every adult in the country had been offered a vaccine, with 87% of their population of 400,000 having received a first dose and 60% having received both doses. The government then said "plans for the vaccination programme and the lifting of restrictions on gatherings have therefore been completed." As of July 2021, more than 260,000 individuals had received at least one dose of COVID-19 vaccine. That was around 78% of the country's total overall population. In July 2021, foreign citizens with proof of vaccination were allowed entry with no quarantine required. After reaching 60% of the adult population vaccinated, Iceland had become "the first European country to lift all domestic coronavirus restrictions."

Since the start of the pandemic until August 8, 2021, there had been 8,738 infections and 30 deaths reported to be related in coronavirus in Iceland. Between May 25, 2021, and August 16, 2021, government statistics recorded no COVID-19 deaths in the country, despite a surge in Delta infections mostly among the vaccinated. Iceland ranked fourth in the world in vaccination rollout at the time with 70.6% of its population vaccinated, beneath the official numbers of Malta, the UAE, and Singapore, and having used Pfizer, Moderna, AstraZeneca, and Johnson & Johnson.

=== Child vaccinations and boosters ===
The vaccination of Icelandic children aged 12 to 15 began on August 22, 2021, with only the Pfizer/BioNTech used, with Chief Epidemiologist Þórólfur Guðnason stating to the public that vaccinating children was "the right thing to do". By November 9, 2021, 30,000 people had received a booster shot in Iceland, or 76% of the total population, and of those people, 10 had contracted COVID. Þórólfur stated that of the around 270,000 people who were fully vaccinated, 4,500 or 1.6% had contracted COVID. At the time, eligible age groups did not include those under 12 years old. Booster vaccination in Iceland began on November 15, 2021, with the government stating the goal was to vaccinate 160,000 people by Christmas with boosters from Pfizer and Moderna. On November 21, 2021, Euronews reported that 90% of the Icelandic population had been fully vaccinated, while around 1 in 5 people had received a booster on top of that. The week prior, the Icelandic government announced the third dose was available to everyone over 16. By December 13, 2021, Iceland had started offering vaccines to 12 to 15 year olds, while 90% of the eligible population was vaccinated, or 76% of Iceland's total population. On December 13, 2021, it was reported that Þórólfur had "decided to offer children aged 5-11 vaccinations against COVID-19, stating that this decision is comparable to what is being done in surrounding countries such as Denmark, Ireland, Austria, the US, Canada and Israel." He said children's vaccinations would begin in 2022 with the Pfizer vaccine.

On January 4, 2022, the following were the official government numbers on COVID-19: there were 9,125 active cases, with 30 hospitalized, and 8 in the ICU, six of whom were unvaccinated. 77% of the population was considered "fully vaccinated," with 160,357 booster shots administered, or to 43.4% of the population. Around 90% of new cases reported daily were the omicron variant, with around 100 people also still testing positive for the Delta variant daily.

== Vaccines on order ==
There are several COVID-19 vaccines at various stages of development around the world.

| Vaccine | Approval | Deployment |
|---|---|---|
| Pfizer–BioNTech | 21 December 2020 | 27 December 2020 |
| Moderna | 6 January 2021 | 12 January 2021 |
| Oxford-AstraZeneca | 29 January 2021 | 7 February 2021 |
| Janssen | 11 March 2021 | Yes |
| Novavax | 20 December 2021 | Pending |
| CureVac | Pending | Pending |
| Valneva | Pending | Pending |
| Sanofi–GSK | Pending | Pending |

== Priority schedule ==
Iceland has divided its population into ten groups in the order of priority of receiving COVID-19 vaccine. These groups are as follows:

- Group 1: Healthcare professionals working at emergency wards.
- Group 2: Healthcare professionals working in outpatient wards.
- Group 3: People living in nursing homes.
- Group 4: Paramedics, ambulance staff, fire brigade employees and other essential workers.
- Group 5: Healthcare professionals in the primary care.
- Group 6: Individuals aged 60 years or above.
- Group 7: Individuals at risk due to underlying long-term illnesses.
- Group 8: Employees in schools and select groups of welfare and social workers.
- Group 9: People living in sensitive circumstances, fragile social and economic situations.
- Group 10: All others.

Everyone will be offered a chance to get a vaccine, but vaccination is not mandatory in Iceland. Pregnant women are not considered as a priority group for vaccination in Iceland.

== Progress to date ==
Data as reported by Our World in Data.

Note: Target population is 12 years and older.
