= COVID-19 pandemic in Iceland =

- Disease: COVID-19
- Pathogen: SARS-CoV-2
- Location: Iceland
- First outbreak: Wuhan, Hubei, China
- Index case: Reykjavík
- Arrival date: 28 February 2020 (6 years, 5 months, 4 weeks and 1 day)
- Confirmed cases: 211,293
- Recovered: 208,931
- Deaths: 186
- Fatality rate: 0.09%

Government website
- covid.is

The COVID-19 pandemic in Iceland was a part of the worldwide pandemic of coronavirus disease 2019 (COVID-19) caused by severe acute respiratory syndrome coronavirus 2 (SARS-CoV-2). The virus was confirmed to have reached Iceland in February 2020. As of 4 June 2022, the total number of cases registered was 188,924, of which 153 deaths had occurred. With a total population of about 370,000 (as of 21 February 2022), the infection rate is about one case per four inhabitants; the infection rate was one of the highest in the world throughout March and April in 2021, though this was attributed to more tests having been carried out per capita in Iceland than any other country, including a screening of the general population run by Icelandic biotech company deCODE genetics to determine the true spread of the virus in the community.

Iceland is unique in that for each identified case of COVID-19, the genome of the virus having caused the infection is sequenced; the sequencing is carried out by deCODE genetics, which has been able to confirm that the so-called "British variant" B.1.1.7 (Alpha) is present in the country, whereas the "South African variant" B.1.351 (Beta) is not; the "Brazilian variant" B.1.1.248 (Gamma) is thought, but not yet confirmed, to have arrived in Iceland as of 22 March 2021, while the "Indian variant" Lineage B.1.617.2 (Delta) was first confirmed in tourists entering the country on 18 June 2021.

== Background ==
On 12 January 2020, the World Health Organization (WHO) confirmed that a novel coronavirus was the cause of a respiratory illness in a cluster of people in Wuhan City, Hubei Province, China, which was reported to the WHO on 31 December 2019.

The case fatality ratio for COVID-19 has been much lower than SARS of 2003, but the transmission has been significantly greater, with a significant total death toll.

== Timeline ==
Cases

Deaths

=== January 2020 ===
In response to the unfolding outbreak of COVID-19 (known at the time by the provisional name 2019-nCov) in China, on 27 January, the Department of Civil Protection declared an uncertainty phase, used to indicate that there is a suspicion that an event that affects public health is imminent. Targeted testing for COVID-19 started on 31 January in Iceland for persons determined at high risk for infection.

=== February 2020 ===
On 28 February, Iceland confirmed the first case of COVID-19, an Icelandic male in his forties, who had been on a ski trip to Andalo in Northern Italy and returned home on 22 February; when he developed symptoms after his arrival, he was quarantined at Landspítali hospital in Reykjavík. Subsequently, The National Commission of the Icelandic Police declared an Alert Phase.

=== March 2020 ===
On 1 March, a second and a third case were confirmed, an Icelandic male in his fifties who had returned home on 29 February from Verona, and a female in her fifties who had returned home from Italy via Munich.

On 2 March, additional six cases were confirmed, bringing the total to nine: five men and four women. All cases to date have been in the Reykjavík area. Five of those cases have been traced to Italy. In response, the Directorate of Health has defined Italy as a risk area for the disease, and all those arriving to Iceland from Italy are being asked to go into a 14-day home quarantine. The ninth case is that of an Icelander who had spent time in Austria and flew home on 1 March. After additional cases were traced to Ischgl in Austria, the Health Directorate defined Ischgl as a high-risk area. Authorities in the Tyrol state of Austria however contend that the Icelanders returning from Ischgl probably became infected on their flight from Munich but this is considered "very unlikely" by Icelandic health authorities as this group presented symptoms very soon after the flight.

On 3 March, in an official press report, sanctions were announced for those who would break the quarantine, which includes up to three months in prison, as it is considered an intentional contagion of the virus.

As of 5 March, around 400 people are in home-based quarantine in Iceland and around 330 individuals have been tested for the virus, but no cases of transmission within the community had been identified. Among individuals who had been tested for the virus, 35 had been confirmed as infected with COVID-19, but officials warned that this figure would rise when additional test results become available in the next few days.

On 6 March, the total number of infected rose to 45, including the first 4 cases of local transmission of the virus. Iceland's Department of Civil Protection and Emergency Management declared a civil protection distress phase within minutes of local transmission of COVID-19 being officially confirmed.

On 7 March, five additional cases were confirmed: three cases of local transmission and two from previously defined high-risk areas. All seven confirmed cases of local transmission are in the Reykjavík area. A total of 484 tests have been administered to date.

On 8 March, the total amount of infected rose to 58, a total of 10 of which are cases of local transmission. Three cases identified on 8 March were of Icelandic residents who had returned to Iceland on a special flight from Verona on 7 March; all passengers were Icelandic residents who had spent time in high-risk areas, and special precautions had already been taken to ensure that they would remain isolated from other passengers on arrival to Keflavík International Airport. That same day, no COVID-19 patients were ill enough to require hospitalisation.

On 9 March, two additional passengers from the special flight from Verona on 7 March tested positive for COVID-19. Three cases of local transmission were identified and two cases of Icelandic residents returning from ski areas in the Alps, bringing the total to 65.

On 11 March, it was reported that a COVID-19 patient had developed more severe symptoms and was admitted to hospital, thus becoming the first patient in Iceland to develop more than mild symptoms of the disease. Also on 11 March 90 people in total had been diagnosed with COVID-19, and 700 were under quarantine.

On 13 March, it was announced that as of Monday 16 March, universities and secondary schools would be closing and a ban on public gatherings of over 100 would be put in place.

On 15 March, it was reported that three COVID-19 patients in Iceland were now in hospital, one in intensive care, and a health clinic in the capital city area (in Mosfellsbær) has been closed after an employee tested positive for COVID-19. A total of 171 cases have been confirmed, a majority of which can be traced to ski areas in the Alps. Chief Epidemiologist Þórólfur Guðnason stated that half of all persons in Iceland who have tested positive for COVID-19 were already self-quarantining (after either returning home from international travel or having been in contact with an infected person), suggesting that measures to control the outbreak through quarantine and isolation in Iceland have been effective so far. An estimated 2500 persons are self-isolating, with the number rising daily.

On 17 March, the first person with coronavirus was confirmed dead, a 36-year-old Australian citizen who was visiting Iceland with his wife. He sought medical attention because of serious illness and died shortly after arriving at the Húsavík health clinic. Dr. Brynjólfur Þór Guðmundsson stated that COVID-19 was the probable cause of death. However, this had been later challenged by Dr Þórólfur Guðnason, the chief of the health directorate's national vaccination program in his interview to public broadcaster RUV: "While he [the visitor] was found to be infected with the coronavirus, it is unlikely to have been the cause of his death. His symptoms came on very quickly and were not those usually associated with Covid-19 deaths." The man's Australian family had also been told that health officials didn't believe the cause of death was due to COVID-19.

On 23 March, an Icelandic woman in her early 70s died from COVID-19 after a week-long battle with the illness.

=== April 2020 ===
Two patients at Landspítali hospital died on 1 April, a man and a woman in their 70s. The man, aged 75, was the husband of the woman that died on 23 March.

A mobile app to trace infections was developed and released on the first of April; after passing review by Google and Apple, the app was downloaded almost 75,000 times by 3 April 2020.

Two more deaths occurred due to the virus on 5 April, taking the total tally of deaths to six. One of the deceased was 67-year-old Sigurður Sverrisson, a renowned Icelandic bridge player; the other was Gunnsteinn Svavar Sigurðsson, a male resident of a nursing home in Bolungarvík in the Westfjords aged 82. On 5 April Iceland also recorded the highest number of active cases during the outbreak, at 1,096; since then, recoveries per day have outnumbered new cases.

On 8 April 2020, as the cases surged over 1,600 and more recoveries than new infections were recorded for the second day in a row, Iceland's head epidemiologist announced that it was highly likely that the country had reached the peak of its outbreak.

Another two individuals died due to the virus by 11 April, taking the total deaths in the country to 8. A ninth patient, in their sixties, died at Landspítali hospital on 16 April; a tenth, a woman in her eighties, died at Berg nursing home in Bolungarvík in the Westfjords on 19 April.

=== September 2020 ===
A sharp rise in the number of infections in mid to late September was traced to two restaurants in Reykjavík, Irishman and Brewdog, and ultimately to two French tourists who tested positive in mid-August but did not follow all rules of quarantine.

=== October 2020 ===
On 16 October, Iceland recorded its eleventh death, its first death since April and first death in the second wave. Iceland announced its twelfth and thirteenth deaths on 28 and 29 October; in the previous week, a spike in the number of cases of those aged over 80 had been recorded.

On 31 October, Iceland recorded its lowest number of cases outside quarantine since September. However, hospitalizations rose to 67 and two more deaths were recorded.

=== November 2020 – August 2021 ===
Iceland recorded its sixteenth death on 1 November, its seventeenth on 2 November, its eighteenth on 4 November, and its nineteenth and twentieth on 7 November. A further three deaths occurred on 8 November, and another – the 24th overall – on 9 November. The 25th death occurred on 11 November in Sólvellir care home in Eyrarbakki; the 26th death occurred on 17 November. On 22 November, there were no new cases outside quarantine. The 27th death occurred on 30 November, the 28th on 7 December, and the 29th on 28 December.

The first COVID-19 related death in Iceland in 2021 and the thirtieth overall occurred on 22 May 2021 when a patient at Landspítali died from the illness after a month. Two more deaths, both of them foreign travellers, occurred at Landspítali on 25 August 2021 and 26 August 2021. The thirty-third death overall, the third in the fourth wave, occurred at Landspítali on 28 August 2021.

=== September–December 2021 ===
A patient being treated for COVID-19 died at Landspítali on 31 October 2021; it was initially unclear whether COVID-19 was also the cause of death, but on 2 November 2021 the decision was made to count the death as COVID-19-related. A male patient in his 70s died at Landspítali on or before 25 November 2021.

On 1 December 2021, Iceland reported its first case of the SARS-CoV-2 Omicron variant. A thirty-sixth death occurred on 10 December 2021 when a patient at Landspítali died from COVID-19, and a thirty-seventh on 18 December 2021.

On 21 December 2021, Health Minister Willum Þór Þórsson introduced new infection prevention restrictions, with a gathering limit of 20 persons, in response to growing omicron cases. The 38th COVID-19-related death occurred on 31 December 2021 when a woman in her eighties died at Landspítali.

=== January–March 2022 ===
The 39th COVID-19-related death occurred on 4 January 2022; an unvaccinated man in his sixties died at Landspítali. On 4 January 2022, the following were the official government numbers on COVID-19: there were 9,125 active cases, with 30 hospitalized, and 8 in the ICU, six of whom were unvaccinated. 77% of the population was considered "fully vaccinated," with 160,357 booster shots administered, or to 43.4% of the population. Around 90% of new cases reported daily were the omicron variant, with around 100 people also still testing positive for the Delta variant daily. Two more deaths–the 40th and 41st overall–occurred on 8 January 2022 when two men, both in their 80s, died at Landspítali, followed soon by the 42nd death on 10 January 2022 when a woman in her 80s died at Landspítali. The 43rd death occurred on 12 January when a man in his 90s died at Landspítali.

== Prevention measures ==
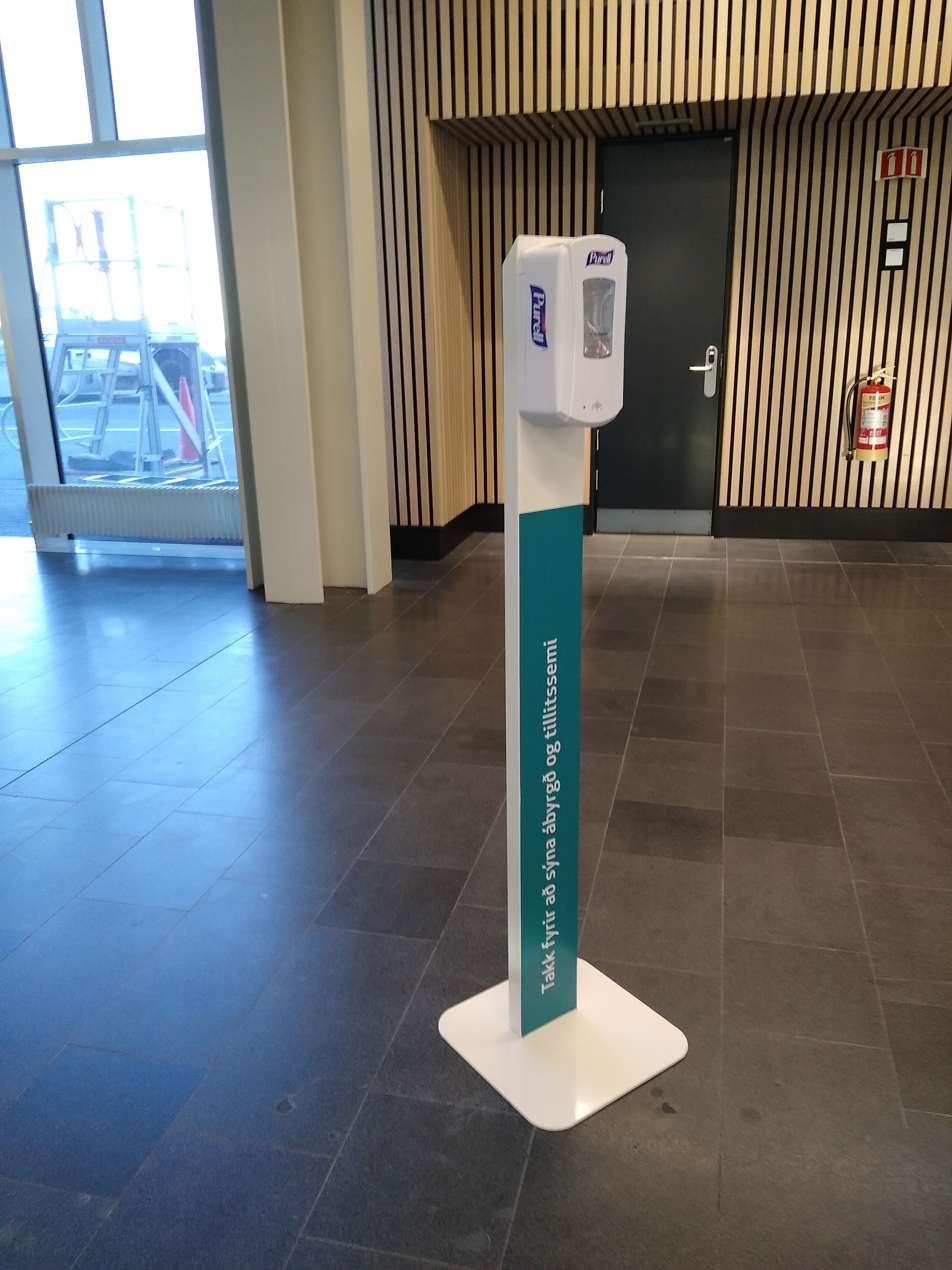
Hand sanitizer at Keflavík International Airport

Throughout the pandemic, The Directorate of Health and The Department of Civil Protection and Emergency Management have maintained an official website with the latest information in Icelandic and English. The response to the pandemic by Icelandic health authorities has focused on early detection and contact tracing and social distancing measures such as a ban on assemblies of more than 20 persons. As a member of the Schengen Area, Iceland is restricting unnecessary travel by persons who are not citizens of the EU, the United Kingdom or the European Free Trade Association countries into the area but has not made other formal restrictions against international or domestic travel.

On 24 January 2020, the Directorate of Health announced preventive measures to curb the spread of SARS-CoV-2. Passengers arriving at the Keflavík International Airport with signs of respiratory infection and asymptomatic individuals who had been either in Wuhan for the past 14 days or in contact with individuals with suspected or confirmed infection were medically assessed at the airport.

From 2 March 2020, healthcare workers in Iceland were being encouraged to avoid travel and to remain in the country.

As of 16 March 2020, no official social distancing measures or limitations or bans on public gatherings are in effect. However, organisers cancelled or postponed a number of upcoming events, including the annual conference of the School of Humanities of the University of Iceland, Hugvísindaþing, which was set to have taken place on 13 and 14 March 2020.

At a press conference on 13 March 2020, it was announced that public gatherings of more than 100 would be banned and universities and secondaries schools closed for four weeks. Later that day, announcements were made that stated or emphasised that:

- panic-buying was unnecessary;
- no shortage of food or medicine was foreseen;
- elementary schools and preschools would not be closed, although restrictions would be in place to maximize social distancing within schools; and that
- all schools in the Reykjavík area would close on 16 March in order to prepare.

On 16 March 2020, the supermarket chain Samkaup announced that 27 grocery shops throughout Iceland would have special shopping times for vulnerable members of the public, including the elderly and those with chronic and underlying illnesses. Beginning 17 March, select Nettó and Kjörbúðin locations would reserve the hour from 9 to 10 a.m. for those shoppers at greatest risk of severe complications should they contract COVID-19.

As of 18 March 2020, the whole world is defined as a high risk area. All travel abroad is discouraged and residents in Iceland who are currently abroad are encouraged to return home as soon as possible. Residents in Iceland who arrive from abroad will now go into quarantine.

On 21 March 2020, a stricter ban on public assemblies was put in place in Vestmannaeyjar. Assemblies there with more than 10 persons would now be prohibited. A still stricter ban was announced for the Húnaþing vestra district, where all inhabitants have been ordered to stay at home except to buy necessities.

From 00:00 on 24 March 2020, a nation-wide ban on public assemblies over 20 took effect. All swimming pools, museums, libraries and bars closed, as did any businesses requiring a proximity of less than 2 m (hairdressers, tattoo artists, etc.).

On 5 October 2020, closure of bars, gyms, and entertainment venues, as well as a limiting of maximum gathering size from 200 to 20, was ordered, due to a rise in cases.

On 24 March 2021, closure of schools, swimming pools and gyms, as well as reducing gathering sizes from 50 to 10, was ordered.

=== Testing and quarantine ===
An early concern among Icelandic residents placed in home-based quarantine has been employees' rights to paid leave while being quarantined; it was announced on 5 March 2020 that the COVID-19 outbreak will likely result in changes to legislation within the next weeks.

Those with symptoms of COVID-19 were asked to avoid health care centres and hospitals unless they called ahead, to avoid exposing vulnerable individuals to the virus.

Official quarantine facilities for healthy individuals unable to enter a home-based quarantine (for example, foreign nationals) have been established at a local hotel in Reykjavík.

Initially, COVID-19 testing for Icelandic residents in quarantine took place mainly in their own homes. Due to the high volume of tests required, the decision was made to use mobile units parked outside health clinics; individuals not experiencing severe symptoms who require testing must contact authorities to book a time and location.

A shortage of tests has reduced the volume of COVID-19 testing in Iceland, hampering control and tracing efforts. It was announced on 22 March that an order of 5,000 swabs set to arrive the following week had been reduced at short notice by 3,000. The unexpected discovery of an additional 6,000 swabs in a warehouse was announced on 26 March 2020.

As of 15 January 2021, all foreigners visiting Iceland are required to take a COVID-19 test upon arrival, quarantine for 5 or 6 days, and then take another test at the end of the quarantine period. This policy is scheduled to remain in place until 1 May 2021.

== Vaccination ==
As of July 2021, more than 260,000 individuals had received at least one dose of COVID-19 vaccine, which was over 78% of the country's population. The vaccines approved for use in Iceland are Pfizer, Moderna, AstraZeneca, Janssen. Iceland has also signed a contract with CureVac. On 21 November 2021, it was reported that 90% of the Icelandic population had been fully vaccinated, while around 1 in 5 people had received a booster on top of that.

== Herd immunity plan ==
By February 2022 the Icelandic population was 80% double vaccinated against COVID-19. The Ministry of Health lifted all remaining COVID-19 restrictions, including gathering limits, restricted opening hours for bars, and border restrictions. The ministry stated that "widespread societal resistance to COVID-19 is the main route out of the epidemic," and "to achieve this, as many people as possible need to be infected with the virus as the vaccines are not enough, even though they provide good protection against serious illness". Experts are nearly unanimous in considering that Iceland's targeting of herd immunity is impossible to achieve.

== Statistics ==
=== Cases ===
Cumulative cases, recoveries, active cases and deaths developed over time Data as reported by the government website.

View source data.

New cases per day

View source data.

Deaths per day

View source data.

=== Vaccination ===
Data as reported by Our World in Data.

Note: Target population is 12 years and older.

== See also ==
- COVID-19 pandemic by country and territory
- COVID-19 pandemic in Europe
