= Landspítali =

Coordinates: 64°08′18″N 21°55′38″W

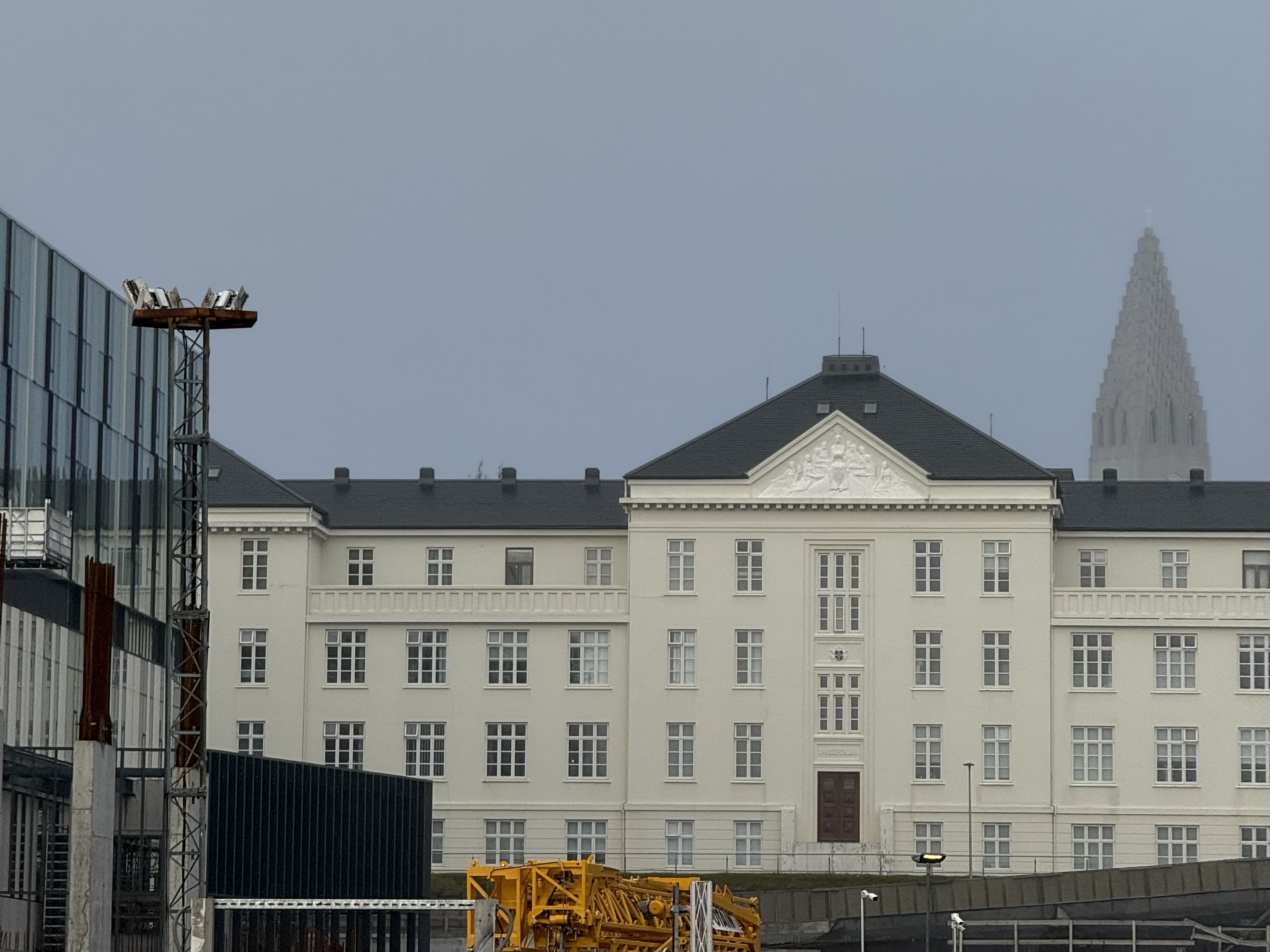
- Landspítali Hospital with the new treatment centre under construction on the left.

Geography
- Location: Hringbraut 101, Reykjavík

Organisation
- Type: General
- Affiliated university: University of Iceland

Services
- Emergency department: Yes
- Beds: 612

Helipads
- Helipad: Yes

History
- Founded: 20 December 1930 (original); 16 May 2000 (merger)

Links
- Website: island.is/en/o/landspitali (in English) island.is/s/landspitali (in Icelandic)

The Landspítali – The National University Hospital of Iceland (Icelandic: Landspítali – Háskólasjúkrahús) offers a wide range of clinical services in outpatient clinics, day patient units, inpatient wards, clinical laboratories and other divisions. Landspítalinn also operates the psychiatric hospital Kleppur.

== History ==
The original Landspítali began operations on 20 December 1930. Ideas for a hospital that served the whole country was not new; in 1863, Jón Hjaltalín, the then Director of Health, proposed a bill that would establish such a hospital, but the bill was not voted on.

During the period from 1863 to 1930, several hospitals operated in Reykjavík. The founding of Landspítali was the product of a long, hard struggle in which women were at the forefront and have ever since played a huge role in the country's hospital matters. In 2000, the Reykjavik City Hospital merged with Landspítali, and the new merged hospital was renamed as Landspítali University Hospital (Landspítali háskólasjúkrahús; LSH) until it reverted to its original name in 2007.

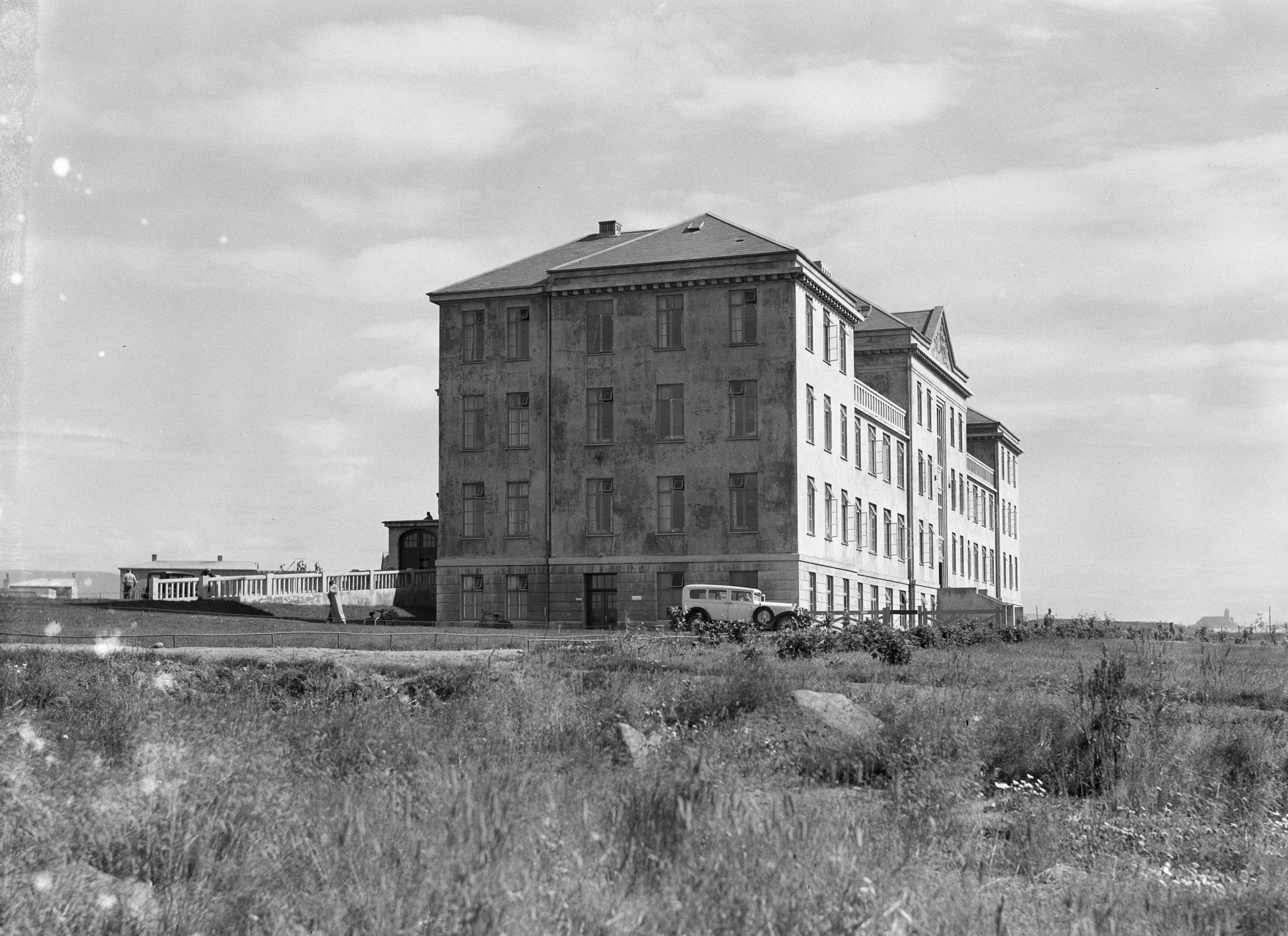
The Hospital in 1934

Approximately 70% of Icelandic children are born in the hospital.

== New National Hospital Project ==
The New National Hospital project (Icelandic: Nýr Landspítali, NLSH) is a large-scale public infrastructure project aimed at replacing the existing facilities of Landspítali. The hospital currently operates across multiple buildings in several locations in the greater Reykjavík area, many of which are said to longer meet modern healthcare requirements.

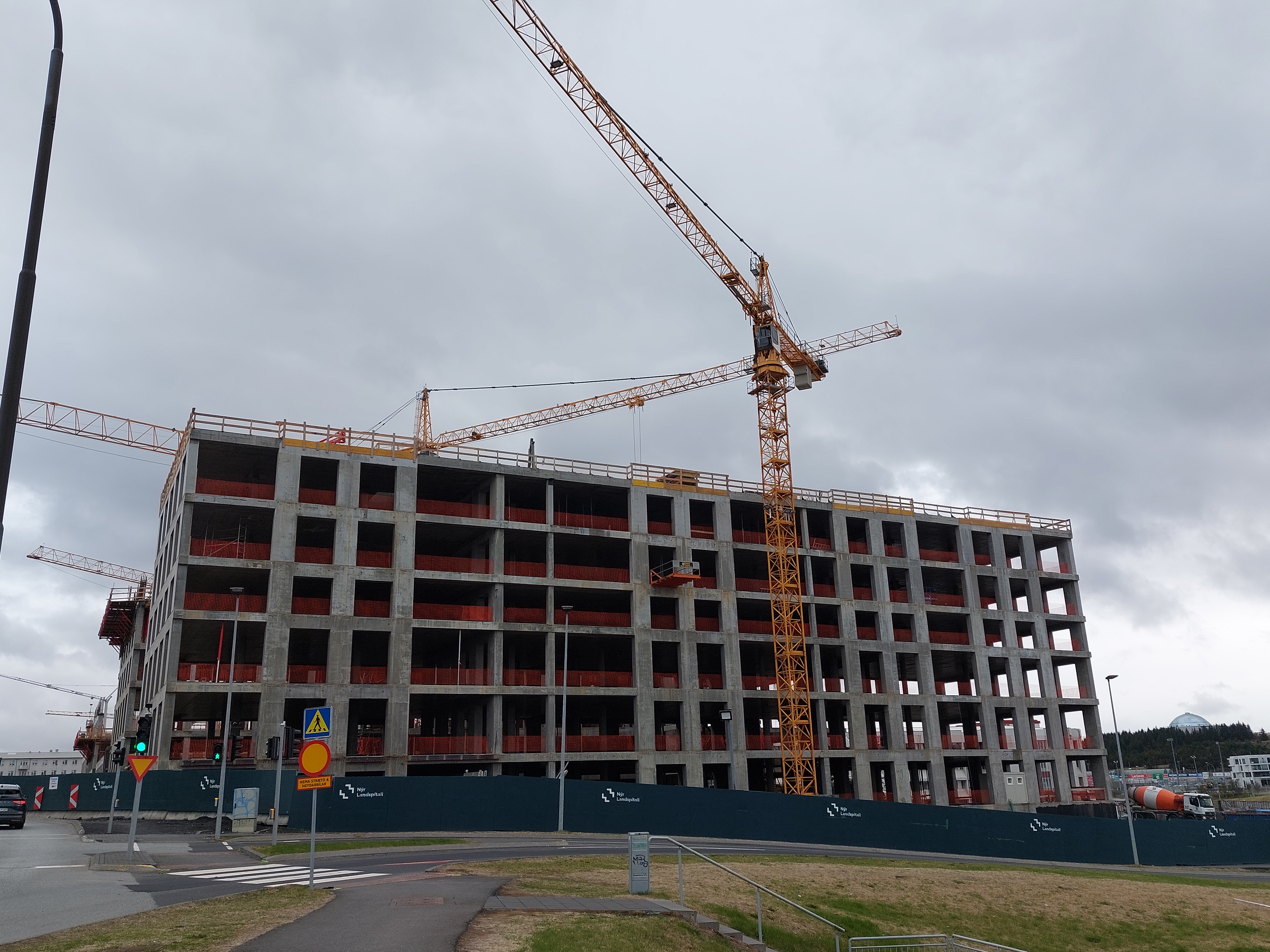
The New National Hospital's Treatment Centre during construction in 2023

The project has faced criticism for delays and cost overruns. After multiple delays, the opening date has slipped from an original target of 2023 to a projected completion of construction by end of 2028, with full operations not expected until 2029–2030. Estimated at 200 billion ISK, costs have exceeded all original projections, and critics have questioned the hospital's location as neither central to modern Reykjavík nor likely to ease the city's traffic problems.
